= 2017–18 Mohun Bagan FC season =

Indian football club season

Mohun Bagan
2017–18 season
- President: Swapan Sadhan Bose
- Head coach: Sanjoy Sen (until 2 January 2018); Sankarlal Chakraborty (from 3 January 2018)
- Stadium: Mohun Bagan Ground; Salt Lake Stadium
- I-League: 3rd
- Calcutta Football League: Runners-up
- Super Cup: Semi-finalist
- Top goalscorer: Aser Pierrick Dipanda (17 goals)
- Highest home attendance: 64,360
- Lowest home attendance: 5,384
- Average home league attendance: 17,258
Home colours	Away colours

The 2017–18 Mohun Bagan FC season was the club's 11th season in I-League and 128th season since its establishment in 1889. They finished 3rd in the I-League and runners-up in the Calcutta Football League. Mohun Bagan reached the semifinals of the Super Cup where they were defeated by Bengaluru.

Sanjoy Sen resigned as the coach of Mohun Bagan on 2 January 2018 following three home draws and a defeat against Chennai City placing the team in 4th position, virtually ending their title hopes. Shankarlal Chakraborthy was appointed as head coach for the remainder of the season.

Their title hopes however did stay intact till the last fixture of the season where they could have won the title had other results gone in their favour, but it was not to be and Minerva Punjab ultimately clinched the title. Despite a midseason coaching change and injuries to key players like Sony Norde and Yuta Kinowaki during the 2017–18 season, they won both the home and away fixtures against arch-rivals East Bengal.

== Sponsor ==
As of 3 December 2017

Sponsors Type	Sponsor's Name
Sponsor	
Co-Sponsor	M.P Birla Cement, Nilkamal, Floral, Ripley
Kit Sponsor	Shiv Naresh

== Players ==
=== Current squad ===
As of March 2018.

Note: Flags indicate national team as defined under FIFA eligibility rules; some limited exceptions apply. Players may hold more than one non-FIFA nationality.

No.	Pos.	Nation	Player
1	GK	IND	Sankar Roy
2	DF	IND	Debabrata Roy
3	DF	NGR	Kingsley Obumneme
4	DF	IND	Kingshuk Debnath
6	DF	IND	Ricky Lallawmawma
7	MF	IND	Chesterpoul Lyngdoh
8	MF	IND	Sourav Das
9	FW	CMR	Aser Pierrick Dipanda
11	FW	NEP	Bimal Gharti Magar
12	MF	JPN	Yuta Kinowaki
13	DF	LBN	Akram Moghrabi
14	DF	IND	Arijit Bagui
15	DF	IND	Abhishek Das
16	DF	IND	Rana Gharami
17	MF	IND	Surchandra Singh
19	FW	IND	Naro Hari Shrestha
21	MF	AUS	Cameron Watson
22	GK	IND	Shilton Paul
23	MF	IND	Nikhil Kadam
25	DF	IND	Bikramjeet Singh
26	MF	IND	Shilton D'Silva
27	MF	IND	Pintu Mahata
28	DF	IND	Gurjinder Kumar
29	MF	IND	Raynier Fernandes
31	GK	IND	Soram Anganba
35	FW	IND	Azharuddin Mallick
36	MF	IND	Dipendu Dowary
37	MF	IND	Beikhokhei Beingaichho
42	GK	IND	Shibinraj Kunniyil
45	FW	IND	Manandeep Singh
47	MF	IND	Sheikh Faiaz

== Competitions ==
=== Calcutta Football League ===
Pos	Team	Pld	W	D	L	GF	GA	GD	Pts	Qualification or relegation
1	East Bengal (C)	9	7	2	0	26	5	+21	23	Champion
2	Mohun Bagan	9	7	2	0	20	5	+15	23	
3	Mohammedan	9	5	2	2	28	14	+14	17	
4	Peerless SC_{1}	9	5	0	4	7	10	−3	15	
5	Tollygunge Agragami_{1}	9	4	1	4	5	13	−8	13	
6	Calcutta Customs	9	3	3	3	6	7	−1	12	
7	NBP Rainbow AC_{1}	9	3	2	4	9	13	−4	11	
8	Pathachakra	9	3	1	5	16	12	+4	10	
9	Southern Samity (R)	4	0	1	3	0	9	−9	1	Relegation to Premier Division B
10	Railway_{1} (R)	9	1	0	8	0	21	−21	3	Relegation to Premier Division B

Updated to match(es) played on 13 September 2017. Source: Soccerway
(C) Champions; (R) Relegated

Note: _{1}=These teams got walkover against Southern Samity and they got 3 point each.

14 August 2017 1	Mohun Bagan	3–0	Southern Samity	Kolkata
17:00 IST	Kromah 52'; Azharuddin Mullick 70'; Shilton D'silva 84'	Report		Stadium: Mohun Bagan Ground

18 August 2017 2	Mohun Bagan	3–0	Railway FC	Kolkata
17:00 IST	Chesterpaul Lyngdoh 63'; Kamo Bayi 79'; Shilton D'silva 90+3'	Report		Stadium: Mohun Bagan Ground

21 August 2017 3	Mohun Bagan	5–2	Pathachakra	Kolkata
17:00 IST	Kamo Bayi 24', 42', 62', 89'; Kromah 58'	Sportskeeda; Flashscore	Nadong Bhutia 15'; Joel Ayeni 90+2'	Stadium: Mohun Bagan Ground

27 August 2017 4	Mohun Bagan	2–0	Calcutta Customs	Kolkata
17:00 IST	Kamo Bayi 32'; Kromah 51'	Sportskeeda		Stadium: Mohun Bagan Ground

3 September 2017 5	Mohun Bagan	2–0	Tollygunge Agragami	Kolkata
17:00 IST	Kromah 16'; Nikhil Kadam 81'	Sportskeeda		Stadium: Mohun Bagan Ground

6 September 2017 6	Mohun Bagan	1–1	Rainbow AC	Kolkata
17:00 IST	Kromah 59'	Flashscore; Sportskeeda	Suraj Mahato 30'	Stadium: Mohun Bagan Ground

11 September 2017 7	Mohun Bagan	2–1	Mohammedan	Kolkata
14:45 IST	Azharuddin Mullick 37', 90+1'	Report	SK Faiz 21'	Stadium: Kalyani Stadium

18 September 2017 8	Mohun Bagan	2–1	Peerless SC	Kolkata
17:00 IST	Kadam Nikhil 33'; Kamo Bayi 62' (pen.)	Flashscore; Sportskeeda	Leonce Dodoz 37'	Stadium: Barasat Stadium

24 September 2025 9	East Bengal FC	2–2	Mohun Bagan	West Bengal, India
17:00 IST	Lalramchullova 43'; Al Amnah M. 65' (pen.)	Flashscore; Sportskeeda	Azharuddin Mallick 2'; Kromah 47' (pen.)	Stadium: Kanchenjunga Stadium

=== I-League ===
==== Table ====
Pos	Team	Pld	W	D	L	GF	GA	GD	Pts	Qualification or relegation
1	Minerva Punjab (C)	18	11	2	5	24	16	+8	35	Qualification to 2019 AFC Champions League qualifier
2	NEROCA	18	9	5	4	20	13	+7	32	
3	Mohun Bagan	18	8	7	3	28	14	+14	31	
4	East Bengal	18	8	7	3	32	19	+13	31	
5	Aizawl	18	6	6	6	21	18	+3	24	

Source: i-league.org
Rules for classification: 1) points; 2) head-to-head points; 3) head-to-head goal difference; 4) goal difference; 5) number of goals scored; 6) drawing of lots
(C) Champions

==== Results by round ====
Round	1	2	3	4	5	6	7	8	9	10	11	12	13	14	15	16	17	18
Ground	A	H	H	H	H	H	H	H	H	A	A	A	A	H	A	A	A	A
Result	D	W	W	D	D	D	L	W	L	W	D	W	D	L	W	W	W	D
Position	6	3	1	2	3	4	4	3	4	4	4	3	4	4	4	4	3	3

Updated to match(es) played on 8 March 2018. Source:
A = Away; H = Home; W = Win; D = Draw; L = Loss

==== Fixtures & results ====
25 November 2017 1	Minerva Punjab	1–1	Mohun Bagan	Ludhiana
17:30 IST	Moinuddin 89'	Report	Sony Norde 43'; Gurjinder Kumar (yellow card) 55'	Stadium: Guru Nanak Stadium; Attendance: 5,995; Referee: Umesh Bora; Man of the Match: Sony Norde (Mohun Bagan AC)

3 December 2017 2	Mohun Bagan	1–0	East Bengal	Kolkata
14:00 IST	Aser Pierrick Dipanda (yellow card) 34'; Kingsley Obumneme 39'; Ricky Lallawmawma (yellow card) 45'	Report	Mehtab Singh (yellow card) 14'; Gurwinder Singh (yellow card) 37'	Stadium: Salt Lake Stadium; Attendance: 64360; Referee: C. R. Srikrishna; Man of the Match: Kingsley Obumneme (Mohun Bagan AC)

10 December 2017 3	Mohun Bagan	5–0	Churchill Brothers	Kolkata
14:00 IST	Ansumana Kromah 23'; Shilton D'Silva (yellow card) 27'; Aser Pierrick Dipanda 34', 46'; Sk.Faiaz 49'; Sony Norde 84'	Report	Karthik Govindswamy (yellow card) 21'; Precious Emuejeraye (yellow card) 26'; Denchandra Meitei (yellow card) 68'; Peter Omoduemuke (yellow card) 89'	Stadium: Salt Lake Stadium; Attendance: 11,894; Referee: Venkatesh R Man of the Match: Aser Pierrick Dipanda (Mohun Bagan AC)

14 December 2017 4	Mohun Bagan	1–1	Shillong Lajong	Kolkata
14:00 IST	Aser Pierrick Dipanda 12' (pen.); Shilton D'Silva (yellow card) 43'; Kingsley Obumneme (yellow card) 55' (yellow-red card) 73'	Report	Rakesh Pradhan (yellow card) 12'; Daniel Odafin (yellow card) 35'; Hardy Nongbri (yellow card) 54'; Samuel Lalmuanpuia 72' (pen.)	Stadium: Salt Lake Stadium; Attendance: 9,882; Referee: Rabichandra Singh Irengbam; Man of the Match: Sheikh Faiaz (Mohun Bagan AC)

19 December 2017 5	Mohun Bagan	0–0	NEROCA	Kolkata
17:30 IST		Report	Ngasepam Tondonba (yellow card) 90+4'	Stadium: Salt Lake Stadium; Attendance: 7,722; Referee: Rowan Arumugham; Man of the Match: Rana Gharami (Mohun Bagan AC)

29 December 2017 6	Mohun Bagan	1–1	Indian Arrows	Kolkata
14:00 IST	Aser Pierrick Dipanda 27' (pen.); Manandeep Singh (yellow card) 71'	Report	Anwar Ali (yellow card) 6'; Rahul Praveen 33'; Amarjit Singh Kiyam (yellow card) 50' (yellow-red card) 65'; Jitendra Singh (yellow card) 90'	Stadium: Mohun Bagan Ground; Attendance: 14,718; Referee: Tejas Visvasrao Nagvenkar; Man of the Match: D Singh (Indian Arrows)

2 January 2018 7	Mohun Bagan	1–2	Chennai City	Kolkata
17:30 IST	Ansumana Kromah 36' (pen.); Abhishek Das (yellow card) 57'; Nikhil Kadam (yellow card) 76'; Manandeep Singh (yellow card) 82'	Report	Jean-Michel Joachim 5'; Michael Soosairaj (yellow card) 62'; Edwin Sydney Vanspaul (yellow card) 62'; Venyamin Shumeyko 71'; Tarif Akhand (yellow card) 76'	Stadium: Mohun Bagan Ground; Attendance: 18,316; Referee: Santhosh Kumar Bhaskaran; Man of the Match: Murilo de Almeida (Chennai City FC)

7 January 2018 8	Mohun Bagan	2–0	Aizawl	Kolkata
14:00 IST	Ricky Lallawmawma (yellow card) 19'; Masih Saighani 54' (o.g.); Aser Pierrick Dipanda 75'; Kingsley Obumneme (yellow card) 81'; Raynier Fernandes (yellow card) 81'	Report	William Lalnunfela (yellow card) 40'; Kareem Omolaja (yellow card) 49'; Lalthathanga Khawlhring (yellow card) 88'; Lalramhmunmawia (yellow card) 90+1'	Stadium: Salt Lake Stadium; Attendance: 5,785; Referee: Ajitkumar Meitei Lairenlakpam; Man of the Match: Aser Pierrick Dipanda (Mohun Bagan AC)

10 January 2018 9	Mohun Bagan	1–2	Minerva Punjab	Kolkata
17:30 IST	Kingshuk Debnath (yellow card) 45+1'; Cameron Watson (yellow card) 75'; Kingsley Obumneme 90+4'	Report	Chencho Gyeltshen 23', 30'; Kassim Aidara (yellow card) 26'; William Opoku (yellow card) 45+1'; Rakshit Dagar (yellow card) 90+5'	Stadium: Salt Lake Stadium; Attendance: 5,384; Referee: Umesh Bora; Man of the Match: Chencho Gyeltshen (Minerva Punjab FC)

21 January 2018 10	East Bengal	0–2	Mohun Bagan	Kolkata
14:00 IST	Armand Bazzie (yellow card) 18'	Report	Dicka 2', 35'; Kingshuk Debnath (yellow card) 17'	Stadium: Salt Lake Stadium; Attendance: 52,951; Referee: C. R. Srikrishna; Man of the Match: Aser Pierrick Dipanda (Mohun Bagan AC)

25 January 2018 11	Aizawl	1–1	Mohun Bagan	Aizawl
14:00 IST	Yugo Kobayashi (yellow card) 1'; Lalthathanga Khawlhring 73'; C Lalrosanga (yellow card) 85'; Alfred Jaryan (red card) 89'	Report	Manandeep Singh (yellow card) 56' (goal) 77' (pen.); Raynier Fernandes (yellow card) 85'	Stadium: Rajiv Gandhi Stadium (Aizawl); Attendance: 3,272; Referee: Senthil Nathan; Man of the Match: Leonce Dodoz Zikahi (Aizawl FC)

3 February 2018 12	Shillong Lajong	0–3	Mohun Bagan	Shillong
17:30 IST		Report	Aser Pierrick Dipanda 30'; Akram Moghrabi 86'; Sheikh Faiaz 89'; Arijit Bagui (yellow card) 90+1'	Stadium: Jawaharlal Nehru Stadium (Shillong); Attendance: 4,700; Referee: Rahul Kumar Gupta; Man of the Match: Akram Moghrabi (Mohun Bagan AC)

7 February 2018 13	Chennai City	0–0	Mohun Bagan	Coimbatore
17:30 IST	Tarif Akhand (yellow card) 39'; Edwin Sydney Vanspaul (yellow card) 81' (yellow-red card) 84'; Kabir Thaufiq (yellow card) 90+9'	Report	Kingsley Obumneme (yellow card) 47'	Stadium: Jawaharlal Nehru Stadium (Coimbatore); Attendance: 7,680; Referee: Akash Jackson Routh; Man of the Match: Jean-Michel Joachim (Chennai City FC)

12 February 2018 14	Mohun Bagan	1–2	Gokulam Kerala	Kolkata
14:00 IST	Nikhil Kadam (yellow card) 16'; Aser Pierrick Dipanda (yellow card) 73' (goal) 78'	Report	Mahmood Al-Ajmi 76'; Henry Kisekka 90'	Stadium: Salt Lake Stadium; Attendance: 4,360; Referee: R Palmson Moses Raj; Man of the Match: Aser Pierrick Dipanda (Mohun Bagan AC)

18 February 2018 15	NEROCA	2–3	Mohun Bagan	Imphal
14:00 IST	Subhash Singh 16'; Felix Chidi Odili 24'; Varney Kallon (yellow card) 33'; Aryn Williams (yellow card) 58'	Report	Aser Pierrick Dipanda 21' (pen.), 30'; Akram Moghrabi (yellow card) 38' (goal) 45+1'	Stadium: Khuman Lampak Main Stadium; Attendance: 20,428; Referee: Crystal John; Man of the Match: Subhash Singh (NEROCA FC)

27 February 2018 16	Indian Arrows	0–2	Mohun Bagan	New Delhi
17:30 IST	Deepak Tangri (yellow card) 45+2'	Report	Aser Pierrick Dipanda 26'; Akram Moghrabi 41'	Stadium: Ambedkar Stadium; Attendance: 2,743; Referee: Velu Dhayalamani; Man of the Match: Aser Pierrick Dipanda (Mohun Bagan AC)

3 March 2018 17	Churchill Brothers	1–2	Mohun Bagan	Vasco da Gama
17:30 IST	Israil Gurung (yellow card) 64'; Monday Osagie 74'	Report	Nikhil Kadam 54'; Aser Pierrick Dipanda (yellow card) 62'; Akram Moghrabi 76'	Stadium: Tilak Maidan Stadium; Attendance: 3,173; Referee: Om Prakash Thakur; Man of the Match: Nikhil Kadam (Mohun Bagan AC)

8 March 2018 18	Gokulam Kerala	1–1	Mohun Bagan	Kozhikode
15:00 IST	Henry Kisekka 45+1' (yellow card) 64'; Mohamed Irshad (yellow card) 50'; Daniel Ashley Addo (yellow card) 77'; Mahmood Al-Ajmi (yellow card) 84'	Report	Aser Pierrick Dipanda 26'; Nikhil Kadam (yellow card) 84'	Stadium: EMS Corporation Stadium; Attendance: 9,572; Referee: Ramaswamy Srikrishna Coimbatore; Man of the Match: Nikhil Bernard (Gokulam Kerala FC)

=== Super Cup ===
==== Round of 16 ====
1 April 2018	Churchill Brothers	1–2	Mohun Bagan	Kalinga Stadium, Bhubaneswar
20:00 IST	Plaza 30'	Report	Dicka 45+3' (pen.), 70'	Attendance: 8,120; Referee: Venkatesh R

==== Quarter final ====
11 April 2018	Mohun Bagan	3–1	Shillong Lajong	Kalinga Stadium, Bhubaneswar
16:00 IST	Faiaz 12' Kadam 22' Moghrabi 59'	Report	Koffi 28'	Attendance: 2,200; Referee: Santosh Kumar

==== Semi final ====
17 April 2018	Mohun Bagan	2–4	Bengaluru	Kalinga Stadium, Bhubaneswar
16:00 IST	Dipanda 42', 90+3'	Report	Miku 62', 65', 88' (pen.); Chhetri 90+1'	Attendance: 3,600; Referee: Tejas Nagvenkar

== Player statistics ==
=== Goal scorers ===
No.	Nat.	Player	CFL	I-League	Super Cup	Total
1	(Cameroon)	Aser Pierrick Dipanda	0	13	4	17
2	(Lebanon)	Kromah	6	2	0	8
3	(Ivory Coast)	Kamo Bayi	7	0	0	7
4	(Lebanon)	Akram Moghrabi	0	4	1	5
5	(India)	Nikhil Kadam	2	1	1	6
5	(India)	Azharuddin Mallick	4	0	0	6
6	(India)	Sheikh Faiaz	0	2	1	3
7	(Nigeria)	Kingsley Obumneme	0	2	0	2
7	(Haiti)	Sony Norde	0	2	0	2
7	(India)	Shilton D'Silva	2	0	0	2
8	(India)	Manandeep Singh	0	1	0	1
8	(India)	Chesterpaul Lyngdoh	1	0	0	1
Own Goals			0	1	0	1
Total			22	28	7	57

Last updated: 17 April 2018.
Source: Competitions

== Technical staff ==
Position	Name
Chief coach	(India) Sankarlal Chakraborty
Assistant coach	—
Goalkeeping coach	(India) Arpan Dey
Physical Trainer	(India) Samiran Bag
Physiotherapist	(India) Abhinandan Chatterjee
Club Doctor	(India) Dr. Protim Roy
Team Manager	(India) Satyajit Chatterjee

Last updated: 9 March 2018
Source: mohunbaganac.com

== Awards ==
=== Player ===
No.	Player	Award	Tournament	Source
22	(India) Shilton Paul	Best Goalkeeper of the Tournament	I-League	
9	(Cameroon) Aser Pierrick Dipanda	Highest Scorer of the Tournament	I-League	
