= 2017–18 Minerva Punjab FC season =

Indian football club season

Minerva Punjab
2017–18 season
- Owner: Ranjit Bajaj
- Head coach: Khogen Singh
- Stadium: Guru Nanak Stadium
- I-League: Winners
- Super Cup: Round of 16
- Top goalscorer: League: Chencho Gyeltshen (7 goals); All: Chencho Gyeltshen (7 goals)
- Highest home attendance: 8,243 vs East Bengal (13 February 2018)
- Lowest home attendance: 3,845 vs Chennai City (11 December 2017)
- Average home league attendance: 5,736
Home colours	Away colours

The 2017–18 Minerva Punjab F.C. season was the second season in the I-League. They finished the season as I-League Champions becoming the first team from North India to win the I-League since its inception.

== Kit ==
Supplier: Astro / Sponsor: Apollo Tyres

Home	Away

== Coaching staff ==
As of 25 November 2017.

Position	Name
Head coach	(India) Khogen Singh
Team Manager	(India) Sachin Badadhe
Physiotherapist	(India) Neeraj Churi
Technical Consultant	(Gibraltar) Joel Williams

== Squad information ==
=== First-team squad ===
As of 11 March 2018

Note: Flags indicate national team as defined under FIFA eligibility rules; some limited exceptions apply. Players may hold more than one non-FIFA nationality.

No.	Pos.	Nation	Player
1	GK	IND	Arshdeep Singh
2	DF	IND	Rahul Baishnab Jaydebdas
3	MF	IND	Sukhdev Singh (Captain)
5	FW	IND	Nadong Bhutia
7	FW	BHU	Chencho Gyeltshen
8	MF	IND	Randeep Singh
9	MF	IND	Bali Gagandeep
10	FW	IND	Moinuddin Khan
11	MF	IND	Girik Khosla
13	MF	NGR	Bazie Armand
14	MF	IND	Altamash Sayed
15	MF	IND	Souvik Das
16	MF	SEN	Kassim Aidara
17	FW	IND	Rajan Negi
18	MF	IND	Akashdeep Singh
19	FW	IND	Mohamman Ajaruddin
20	FW	IND	Makan Chote
21	DF	IND	Akash Sangwan

No.	Pos.	Nation	Player
22	DF	IND	Kamalpreet Singh
24	DF	CIV	Guy Eric Dano
25	DF	IND	Arashpreet Singh
26	DF	IND	Deepak Devrani
27	DF	IND	Abhishek Ambedkar
28	MF	IND	Akhil Verma
31	GK	NEP	Kiran Chemjong
39	FW	CIV	Lago Dagbo Bei
40	GK	IND	Rakshit Dagar
41	MF	IND	Bhaskar Roy
42	MF	GHA	William Opoku
49	MF	IND	Amandeep Singh
—	DF	IND	Ramandeep Singh
—	DF	IND	Harpreet Singh

== Competitions ==
=== Overview ===
Competition	First match	Last match	Starting round	Final position	Record							
Competition	First match	Last match	Starting round	Final position	Pld	W	D	L	GF	GA	GD	Win %
I-League	25 November 2017	8 March 2018	Matchday 1	Winners	18	11	2	5	24	16	+8	61.11
Super Cup	2 April 2018	2 April 2018	Round of 16	Round of 16	1	0	0	1	4	5	−1	0.00
Total					19	11	2	6	28	21	+7	57.89

Last updated: 12 March 2018.
Source: Competitions

=== I-League ===
==== League table ====
Pos	Team	Pld	W	D	L	GF	GA	GD	Pts	Qualification or relegation
1	Minerva Punjab (C)	18	11	2	5	24	16	+8	35	Qualification to 2019 AFC Champions League qualifier
2	NEROCA	18	9	5	4	20	13	+7	32	
3	Mohun Bagan	18	8	7	3	28	14	+14	31	
4	East Bengal	18	8	7	3	32	19	+13	31	
5	Aizawl	18	6	6	6	21	18	+3	24	

Source: i-league.org
Rules for classification: 1) points; 2) head-to-head points; 3) head-to-head goal difference; 4) goal difference; 5) number of goals scored; 6) drawing of lots
(C) Champions

==== Result summary ====
Overall								Home						Away					
Pld	W	D	L	GF	GA	GD	Pts	W	D	L	GF	GA	GD	W	D	L	GF	GA	GD
18	11	2	5	24	16	+8	35	6	1	2	12	7	+5	5	1	3	12	9	+3

Last updated: 9 March 2018.
Source: i-league.org

==== Results by match ====
Round	1	2	3	4	5	6	7	8	9	10	11	12	13	14	15	16	17	18
Ground	H	H	A	H	H	A	A	A	A	A	A	A	H	H	H	H	A	H
Result	D	W	W	W	W	L	W	W	W	W	D	L	W	L	L	W	L	W

Source: i-league.org
A = Away; H = Home; W = Win; D = Draw; L = Loss

==== Matches ====
Win Draw Loss

25 November 2017 1	Minerva Punjab	1–1	Mohun Bagan	Ludhiana
17:30 IST	Moinuddin 89'	Report	Sony Norde 43'; Gurjinder Kumar (yellow card) 55'	Stadium: Guru Nanak Stadium; Attendance: 5,995; Referee: Umesh Bora; Man of the Match: Sony Norde (Mohun Bagan AC)

1 December 2017 2	Minerva Punjab	2–1	NEROCA	Ludhiana
17:30 IST	Chencho Gyeltshen 24'; Lago Dagbo Bei 45+2'	Report	Felix Chidi Odili 18'; Moirangmayum Ashok Singh (yellow card) 49'; Aryn Williams (yellow card) 90+6'	Stadium: Guru Nanak Stadium; Attendance: 5,734; Referee: Senthil Nathan; Man of the Match: Chencho Gyeltshen (Minerva Punjab FC)

5 December 2017 3	Indian Arrows	0–2	Minerva Punjab	Bambolim
20:00 IST		Report	William Opoku 7', 84'; Kamalpreet Singh (yellow card) 86'	Stadium: GMC Bambolim; Attendance: 776; Referee: Akash Jackson Routh; Man of the Match: William Opoku (Minerva Punjab)

11 December 2017 4	Minerva Punjab	2–1	Chennai City	Ludhiana
20:00 IST	William Opoku 48'; Kassim Aidara 59'; Bali Gagandeep (yellow card) 70'	Report	Jean-Michel Joachim 5'; Murilo de Almeida (yellow card) 19'; Pradeep Mohannraj (yellow card) 89'	Stadium: Guru Nanak Stadium; Attendance: 3,845; Referee: Om Prakash Thakur; Man of the Match: Kassim Aidara (Minerva Punjab)

18 December 2017 5	Minerva Punjab	1–0	Indian Arrows	Ludhiana
20:00 IST	Chencho Gyeltshen 80'	Report		Stadium: Guru Nanak Stadium; Attendance: 5,342; Referee: Rahul Kumar Gupta; Man of the Match: Dheeraj Singh (Indian Arrows)

27 December 2017 6	Aizawl	2–1	Minerva Punjab	Aizawl
14:00 IST	Kareem Omolaja 72'; Masih Saighani (yellow card) 75'; Andrei Ionescu 86'	Report	Chencho Gyeltshen (yellow card) 61'; Amandeep Singh (yellow card) 78'; Girik Khosla 90+4'	Stadium: Rajiv Gandhi Stadium (Aizawl); Attendance: 4,200; Referee: Raktim Saha; Man of the Match: Léonce Dodoz Zikahi (Aizawl FC)

6 January 2018 7	Gokulam Kerala	0–1	Minerva Punjab	Kozhikode
17:30 IST	Kivi Zhimomi (yellow card) 51'; Emmanuel Chigozie (yellow card) 76'; Daniel Ashley Addo (yellow card) 84'	Report	Bali Gagandeep 19'	Stadium: EMS Corporation Stadium; Attendance: 4,534; Referee: Senthil Nathan; Man of the Match: Bali Gagandeep (Minerva Punjab FC)

10 January 2018 8	Mohun Bagan	1–2	Minerva Punjab	Kolkata
17:30 IST	Kingshuk Debnath (yellow card) 45+1'; Cameron Watson (yellow card) 75'; Kingsley Obumneme 90+4'	Report	Chencho Gyeltshen 23', 30'; Kassim Aidara (yellow card) 26'; William Opoku (yellow card) 45+1'; Rakshit Dagar (yellow card) 90+5'	Stadium: Salt Lake Stadium; Attendance: 5,384; Referee: Umesh Bora; Man of the Match: Chencho Gyeltshen (Minerva Punjab FC)

14 January 2018 9	Shillong Lajong	0–1	Minerva Punjab	Shillong
14:00 IST	Daniel Odafin (yellow card) 32'	Report	William Opoku 57'; Kassim Aidara (yellow card) 61'; Rakshit Dagar (yellow card) 86'	Stadium: Jawaharlal Nehru Stadium; Attendance: 5,800; Referee: Ranjit Bakshi; Man of the Match: Rakshit Dagar (Minerva Punjab FC)

27 January 2018 10	NEROCA	0–1	Minerva Punjab	Imphal
14:00 IST	Govin Singh (yellow card) 41'	Report	Chencho Gyeltshen 3'; Kassim Aidara (yellow card) 17'; Guy Eric Dano 21'; Altamash Sayed (yellow card) 42'	Stadium: Khuman Lampak Main Stadium; Attendance: 17,014; Referee: Palmson Moses Raj; Man of the Match: Chencho Gyeltshen (Minerva Punjab FC)

30 January 2018 11	East Bengal	2–2	Minerva Punjab	Barasat Stadium
13:55 IST	Katsumi Yusa (penalty missed) 47'; Joby Justin 59'; Eduardo Ferreira (yellow card) 72'; Brandon Vanlalremdika 88'	Report	Sukhdev Singh 20'; Chencho Gyeltshen 33'; Souvik Das (yellow card) 68'; Guy Eric Dano (yellow card) 90+2'	Attendance: 11,200; Referee: Tejas Nagvenkar; Man of the Match: Kiran Chemjong (Minerva Punjab FC)

2 February 2018 12	Churchill Brothers	2–1	Minerva Punjab	Vasco da Gama
17:30 IST	Mechac Koffi 17' (pen.); Bektur Talgat Uulu (yellow card) 39'; Wayne Vaz 45'; Hussein Eldor (yellow card) 84'	Report	Sukhdev Singh (yellow card) 16'; Girik Khosla (yellow card) 51'; Kassim Aidara 57'	Stadium: Tilak Maidan Stadium; Attendance: 2,442; Referee: Akash Jackson Routh; Man of the Match: Wayne Vaz (Churchill Brothers SC)

7 February 2018 13	Minerva Punjab	3–2	Shillong Lajong	Panchkula
14:00 IST	Guy Eric Dano 5'; Bali Gagandeep 45+1', 80' (yellow card) 53'	Report	Daniel Odafin 60'; Lawrence Doe 63' (yellow card) 90+3'; Novin Gurung (yellow card) 89'	Stadium: Tau Devi Lal Stadium; Attendance: 6,898; Referee: Tejas Nagvenkar; Man of the Match: Bali Gagandeep (Minerva Punjab)

13 February 2018 14	Minerva Punjab	0–1	East Bengal	Panchkula
14:00 IST	Amandeep Singh (yellow card) 45+1'; Bali Gagandeep (yellow card) 70'	Report	Cavin Lobo 60'; Mahmoud Amnah (yellow card) 77'; Ubaid C.K. (yellow card) 90+2'	Stadium: Tau Devi Lal Stadium; Attendance: 8,243; Referee: Ajit Kumar Meitei; Man of the Match: Mahmoud Amnah (East Bengal FC)

20 February 2018 15	Minerva Punjab	0–1	Gokulam Kerala	Panchkula
14:00 IST	Randeep Singh (yellow card) 4'	Report	Mohamed Rashid (yellow card) 16'; Mudde Musa (yellow card) 19'; Balwinder Singh (yellow card) 42'; Henry Kisekka 75'	Stadium: Tau Devi Lal Stadium; Attendance: 3,890; Referee: Palmson Moses Raj; Man of the Match: Bilal Husain Khan (Gokulam Kerala)

26 February 2018 16	Minerva Punjab	2–0	Aizawl	Panchkula
14:00 IST	Akash Sangwan 50'; Akashdeep Singh (yellow card) 59'; Armand Bazie 90+5'	Report	David Lalrinmuana (yellow card) 90+5'	Stadium: Tau Devi Lal Stadium; Attendance: 4,428; Referee: Khamruddin Mohammed Avez; Man of the Match: Guy Eric Dano (Minerva Punjab FC)

2 March 2018 17	Chennai City	2–1	Minerva Punjab	Coimbatore
17:30 IST	Michael Soosairaj 5'; Dharmaraj Ravanan (yellow card) 21'; Aleksandar Rakić 59'; Edwin Sydney Vanspaul (yellow card) 81'; Asif Kottayil (yellow card) 90+3'	Report	Chencho Gyeltshen 26'; Souvik Das (yellow card) 29'	Stadium: Jawaharlal Nehru Stadium; Attendance: 7,342; Referee: Santhosh Kumar Bhaskaran; Man of the Match: Michael Soosairaj (Chennai City FC)

8 March 2018 18	Minerva Punjab	1–0	Churchill Brothers	Panchkula
17:30 IST	William Opoku 16'; Guy Eric Dano (yellow card) 36'; Amandeep Singh (yellow card) 58'	Report	Francis Oneyama (yellow card) 41'	Stadium: Tau Devi Lal Stadium; Attendance: 7,852; Referee: Rahul Kumar Gupta; Man of the Match: Ricardo Cardozo (Churchill Brothers SC)

=== Super Cup ===
Minerva Punjab FC entered the competition in Round of 16 and were drawn against Jamshedpur. However, they lost in the first game in penalty shootouts, concluding the season for I-League champions.

Win Draw Loss

2 April 2018 Round of 16	Minerva Punjab	0–0 (a.e.t.) (4–5 p)	Jamshedpur	Bhubaneshwar
		Report		Stadium: Kalinga Stadium; Attendance: 3,256; Referee: Santosh Kumar; Man of the Match: Sanjiban Ghosh (Jamshedpur FC)
	Penalties
	Opoku (penalty scored); Dano (penalty scored); Khan (penalty missed); A. Singh (penalty scored); K. Singh (penalty scored); Kiran (penalty missed); Gagandeep (penalty missed)		(penalty scored) Belfort; (penalty scored) Priori; (penalty missed) Memo; (penalty scored) Bikey; (penalty scored) Passi; (penalty missed) Jairu; (penalty scored) Hossain

== Awards ==
=== Player ===
No.	Player	Award	Tournament	Source
7	(Bhutan) Chencho Gyeltshen	Best Forward of the Tournament	I-League	

== See also ==
- 2017–18 in Indian football
- 2017–18 I-League
