= 2018 AIFF Super Cup =

2018 Super Cup
Hero Super Cup
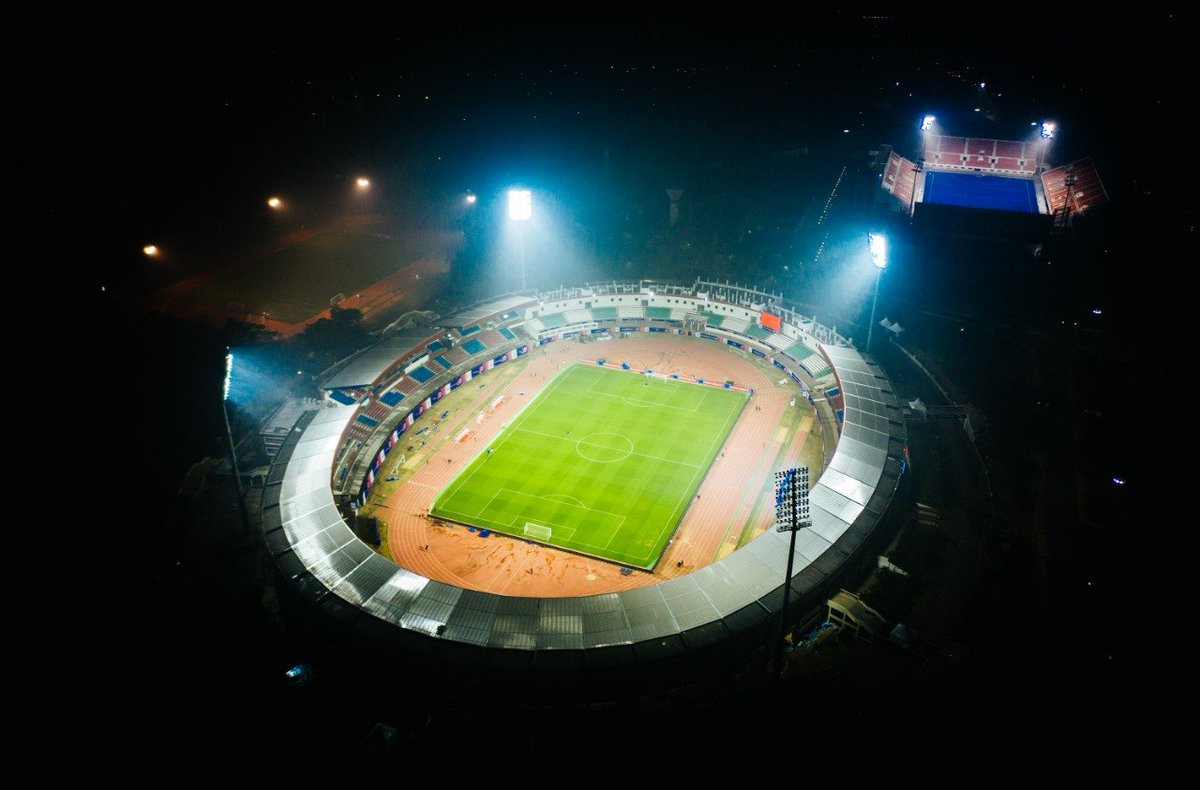
- Kalinga Stadium hosted the final on 20 April 2018

Tournament details
- Country: India
- Venue(s): Kalinga Stadium, Bhubaneswar
- Dates: 15 – 16 Match (qualifiers); 31 March – 20 April (main competition)
- Teams: 20

Final positions
- Champions: Bengaluru (1st title)
- Runners-up: East Bengal

Tournament statistics
- Matches played: 19
- Goals scored: 67 (3.53 per match)
- Attendance: 53,969 (2,840 per match)
- Top goal scorer: Sunil Chhetri (6 goals)

Awards
- Best player: Miku

The 2018 AIFF Super Cup, officially known as the 2018 Hero Super Cup for sponsorship reasons, was the inaugural edition of the Super Cup and the 39th season of the national knockout football competition in India. The competition was sponsored by Hero MotoCorp. The Super Cup replaced the Federation Cup as the national knockout competition. The competition began with the qualifiers on 15 March 2018 and concluded with the final on 20 April 2018. The entire tournament took place in the Kalinga Stadium, Bhubaneswar.

The competition featured teams from both the I-League and the Indian Super League. Both leagues contain 10 teams each; the top six teams from both qualified for the tournament automatically, while the bottom four sides contested in the qualifiers.

Bengaluru won the title by defeating East Bengal in the final.

== Teams ==
A total of 16 teams are participating in the competition proper. The top six teams from both the I-League and Indian Super League qualified for the Super Cup automatically while the bottom four sides have participated in the qualifiers.

| Qualification round (8 teams) (Note: Teams listed based on final position in either I-League or Indian Super League.) | Main competition (12 teams) (Note: Teams listed based on final position in either I-League or Indian Super League.) |
| I-League: Gokulam Kerala; Chennai City; Churchill Brothers; Indian Arrows; Indian Super League: Mumbai City; Delhi Dynamos; ATK; NorthEast United | I-League: Minerva Punjab; NEROCA; Mohun Bagan; East Bengal; Aizawl; Shillong Lajong; Indian Super League: Bengaluru; Chennaiyin; Goa; Pune City; Jamshedpur; Kerala Blasters |

== Schedule ==
On 12 March 2018, the All India Football Federation announced the schedule and full format of the tournament. Due to the participation of Aizawl and Bengaluru in the AFC Cup, the schedule for the quarter-finals shall be decided at a later date.

| Phase | Round | Match dates |
|---|---|---|
| Qualification round | | 15–16 March 2018 |
| Main tournament | Round of 16 | 31 March – 6 April 2018 |
| Main tournament | Quarter-finals | 8–13 April 2018 |
| Main tournament | Semi-finals | 16–17 April 2018 |
| Main tournament | Final | 20 April 2018 |

== Bracket ==
Qualification round
16 March
Mumbai City (a.e.t.) | 2
Indian Arrows | 1
16 March
ATK | 4
Chennai City | 1
15 March
Delhi Dynamos | 1
Churchill Brothers (a.e.t.) | 2
15 March
NorthEast United | 0
Gokulam Kerala | 2

Round of 16
31 March
Aizawl (pen.) | 2 (5)
Chennaiyin | 2 (3)
5 April
East Bengal | 2
Mumbai City | 1
2 April
Minerva Punjab | 0 (4)
Jamshedpur (pen.) | 0 (5)
3 April
Goa | 3
ATK | 1
1 April
Churchill Brothers | 1
Mohun Bagan | 2
4 April
Pune City | 2
Shillong Lajong | 3
1 April
Bengaluru | 2
Gokulam Kerala | 1
6 April
NEROCA | 3
Kerala Blasters | 2

Quarter-finals
8 April
Aizawl | 0
East Bengal | 1
12 April
Jamshedpur | 1
Goa | 5
11 April
Mohun Bagan | 3
Shillong Lajong | 1
13 April
Bengaluru | 3
NEROCA | 1

Semi-finals
16 April
East Bengal | 1
Goa | 0
17 April
Mohun Bagan | 2
Bengaluru | 4

Final
20 April
East Bengal | 1
Bengaluru | 4

== Qualification round ==
After the conclusion of the I-League and Indian Super League seasons, the All India Football Federation announced the draw for the qualification round of the Super Cup.

15 March 2018
17:00 IST

| Delhi Dynamos | 1–2 (a.e.t.) | Churchill Brothers |
|---|---|---|
| Uche 6' | Report | Plaza 34', 106' |

Kalinga Stadium, Bhubaneswar
Attendance: 2,000
Referee: C. R. Srikrishna

15 March 2018
20:00 IST

| NorthEast United | 0–2 | Gokulam Kerala |
|---|---|---|
| | Report | Kisekka 43', 74' |

Kalinga Stadium, Bhubaneswar
Attendance: 1,500
Referee: Tejas Nagvenkar

16 March 2018
17:00 IST

| Mumbai City | 2–1 (a.e.t.) | Indian Arrows |
|---|---|---|
| Emaná 90' (pen.); Santos 104' | Report | Praveen 77' |

Kalinga Stadium, Bhubaneswar
Attendance: 3,000
Referee: Ajitkumar Lairenlakpam

16 March 2018
20:00 IST

| ATK | 4–1 | Chennai City |
|---|---|---|
| Sharma 37'; Zequinha 58'; Mehta 76'; Keane 83' | Report | Joachim 45+7' |

Kalinga Stadium, Bhubaneswar
Attendance: 3,000

== Round of 16 ==
The All India Football Federation announced the draw for the round of 16 of the competition on 12 March 2018.

31 March 2018
20:00 IST

| Chennaiyin | 2–2 (a.e.t.) | Aizawl |
|---|---|---|
| Alves 89'; D. Singh 114' | Report | Ionescu 22', 91' |
Penalties
| B. Singh (penalty scored); Rafi (penalty missed); D. Singh (penalty scored); Ganesh (penalty scored) | 3–5 | (penalty scored) Ionescu; (penalty scored) Dodoz; (penalty scored) Saighani; (penalty scored) Lalchhawnkima; (penalty scored) Lalmuankima |

Kalinga Stadium, Bhubaneswar
Attendance: 5,000
Referee: Pranjal Banerjee

1 April 2018
17:00 IST

| Bengaluru | 2–1 | Gokulam Kerala |
|---|---|---|
| Miku 69'; U. Singh 90+2' | Report | Kisekka 33' |

Kalinga Stadium, Bhubaneswar
Attendance: 4,233
Referee: Tejas Nagvenkar

1 April 2018
20:00 IST

| Churchill Brothers | 1–2 | Mohun Bagan |
|---|---|---|
| Plaza 30' | Report | Dipanda 45+3' (pen.), 70' |

Kalinga Stadium, Bhubaneswar
Attendance: 8,120
Referee: Venkatesh R

2 April 2018
20:00 IST

| Minerva Punjab | 0–0 (a.e.t.) | Jamshedpur |
|---|---|---|
| | Report |
Penalties
| Opoku (penalty scored); Dano (penalty scored); Khan (penalty missed); A. Singh (penalty scored); K. Singh (penalty scored); Chemjong (penalty missed); Gagandeep (penalty missed) | 4–5 | (penalty scored) Belfort; (penalty scored) Priori; (penalty missed) Memo; (penalty scored) Bikey; (penalty scored) Passi; (penalty missed) Jairu; (penalty scored) Hossain |

Kalinga Stadium, Bhubaneswar
Attendance: 3,256
Referee: Santosh Kumar

3 April 2018
20:00 IST

| Goa | 3–1 | ATK |
|---|---|---|
| Coro 45+1'; Boumous 70'; Fernandes 77' | Report | Keane 50' |

Kalinga Stadium, Bhubaneswar
Attendance: 2,583
Referee: Rowan Arumughan

4 April 2018
20:00 IST

| Pune City | 2–3 | Shillong Lajong |
|---|---|---|
| Lucca 17'; Marcelinho 21' | Report | Koffi 29'; Pradhan 61'; Lalmuanpuia 90+2' (pen.) |

Kalinga Stadium, Bhubaneswar
Attendance: 728
Referee: C. R. Srikrishna

5 April 2018
20:00 IST

| Mumbai City | 1–2 | East Bengal |
|---|---|---|
| Emaná 22' | Report | Yusa 26'; Amnah 73' |

Kalinga Stadium, Bhubaneswar
Attendance: 4,354
Referee: Venkatesh R

6 April 2018
20:00 IST

| NEROCA | 3–2 | Kerala Blasters |
|---|---|---|
| Joachim 68'; Williams 79'; Odili 81' (pen.) | Report | Pulga 11'; Prasanth 49' |

Kalinga Stadium, Bhubaneswar
Attendance: 1,865
Referee: Pranjal Banerjee

== Quarter-finals ==
The dates for the quarter-final matches were scheduled to be announced at a later date to accommodate AFC Cup commitments of Aizawl and Bengaluru. After Aizawl and Bengaluru advanced to the quarter-finals, the following fixtures were confirmed for the quarter-finals. During the game between Jamshedpur FC and FC Goa, six players (three each from both the teams) were sent off at the half-time for violent conduct. In the games against NEROCA F.C., Sunil Chhetri scored the first hat-trick of the tournament.

8 April 2018
16:00 IST

| Aizawl | 0–1 | East Bengal |
|---|---|---|
| | Report | Ralte 90+6' (pen.) |

Kalinga Stadium, Bhubaneswar
Attendance: 3,286
Referee: C. R. Srikrishna

11 April 2018
16:00 IST

| Mohun Bagan | 3–1 | Shillong Lajong |
|---|---|---|
| Faiaz 12'; Kadam 22'; Moghrabi 59' | Report | Koffi 28' |

Kalinga Stadium, Bhubaneswar
Attendance: 4,200
Referee: Santosh Kumar

12 April 2018
16:00 IST

| Jamshedpur | 1–5 | Goa |
|---|---|---|
| Biswas 90+1' | Report | Fernandes 34'; Coro 69' (pen.); M. Singh 77'; Boumous 79', 89' |

Kalinga Stadium, Bhubaneswar
Attendance: 1,200
Referee: Venkatesh R

13 April 2018
16:00 IST

| Bengaluru | 3–1 | NEROCA |
|---|---|---|
| Chhetri 12', 55', 90+4' | Report | Singh 45+3' |

Kalinga Stadium, Bhubaneswar
Attendance: 1,100
Referee: Tejas Nagvenkar

== Semi-finals ==
The semi-finals were played on 16 April and 17 April 2018 at the Kalinga Stadium.

16 April 2018
16:00 IST

| East Bengal | 1–0 | Goa |
|---|---|---|
| Dudu 78' | Report |

Kalinga Stadium, Bhubaneswar
Attendance: 4,200
Referee: Santosh Kumar

17 April 2018
16:00 IST

| Mohun Bagan | 2–4 | Bengaluru |
|---|---|---|
| Dipanda 42', 90+3' | Report | Miku 62', 65', 88' (pen.); Chhetri 90+1' |

Kalinga Stadium, Bhubaneswar
Attendance: 3,600
Referee: Tejas Nagvenkar

== Final ==
The final was played on 20 April 2018 at the Kalinga Stadium and Bengaluru won the inaugural Super Cup by defeating East Bengal in the final.

20 April 2018
16:00 IST

| East Bengal | 1–4 | Bengaluru |
|---|---|---|
| Kromah 28' | Report | Bheke 39'; Chhetri 69' (pen.), 90+1'; Miku 71' |

Kalinga Stadium, Bhubaneswar
Attendance: 9,500
Referee: C. R. Srikrishna (Tamil Nadu)

== Goalscorers ==
6 goals

- (India) Sunil Chhetri (Bengaluru)

5 goals

- (Venezuela) Miku (Bengaluru)

4 goals

- (Cameroon) Aser Pierrick Dipanda (Mohun Bagan)

3 goals

- (Morocco) Hugo Boumous (Goa)

2 goals

- (Romania) Andrei Ionescu (Aizawl)
- (Ivory Coast) Abdoulaye Koffi (Shillong Lajong)
- (Spain) Coro (Goa)
- (India) Brandon Fernandes (Goa)

1 goal

- (Republic of Ireland) Robbie Keane (ATK)
- (India) Udanta Singh (Bengaluru)
- (India) Rahul Bheke (Bengaluru)
- (Brazil) Maílson Alves (Chennaiyin)
- (India) Dhanachandra Singh (Chennaiyin)
- (Trinidad and Tobago) Willis Plaza (Churchill Brothers)
- (Japan) Katsumi Yusa (East Bengal)
- (Syria) Mahmoud Amnah (East Bengal)
- (Nigeria) Dudu Omagbemi (East Bengal)
- (India) Laldanmawia Ralte (East Bengal)
- (Liberia) Ansumana Kromah (East Bengal)
- (India) Manvir Singh (Goa)
- (Uganda) Henry Kisekka (Gokulam Kerala)
- (India) Ashim Biswas (Jamshedpur)
- (Spain) Pulga (Kerala Blasters)
- (India) Prasanth Karuthadathkuni (Kerala Blasters)
- (India) Sheikh Faiaz (Mohun Bagan)
- (India) Nikhil Kadam (Mohun Bagan)
- (Lebanon) Akram Moghrabi (Mohun Bagan)
- (Cameroon) Achille Emaná (Mumbai City)
- (France) Jean-Michel Joachim (NEROCA)
- (Australia) Aryn Williams (NEROCA)
- (Nigeria) Felix Chidi Odili (NEROCA)
- (India) Pritam Singh (NEROCA)
- (Brazil) Jonatan Lucca (Pune City)
- (Brazil) Marcelinho (Pune City)
- (India) Rakesh Pradhan (Shillong Lajong)
- (India) Samuel Lalmuanpuia (Shillong Lajong)

== See also ==
- 2017–18 I-League
- 2017–18 Indian Super League
