= 2017–18 I-League =

11th season of the I-League

I-League
- Season: 2017–18
- Dates: 25 November 2017 – 8 March 2018
- Champions: Minerva Punjab; 1st I-League title 1st Indian title
- Relegated: Churchill Brothers
- AFC Champions League: Minerva Punjab
- Matches: 90
- Goals: 205 (2.28 per match)
- Top goalscorer: Aser Pierrick Dipanda (13 goals)
- Best goalkeeper: Shilton Paul (8 clean sheets)
- Biggest home win: East Bengal 7–1 Chennai City (24 February 2018)
- Biggest away win: Gokulam Kerala 0–3 NEROCA (9 December 2017)
- Highest scoring: East Bengal 7–1 Chennai City (24 February 2018)
- Longest winning run: Minerva Punjab; East Bengal(4 games)
- Longest unbeaten run: NEROCA (9 games)
- Longest winless run: Churchill Brothers (6 games)
- Longest losing run: Churchill Brothers (5 games )
- Highest attendance: 64,630; Mohun Bagan vs East Bengal (3 December 2017)
- Lowest attendance: 218; Indian Arrows vs Chennai City (29 November 2017)
- Total attendance: 832,665
- Average attendance: 10,280

The 2017–18 I-League was the 11th season of the I-League. Aizawl were the defending champions. NEROCA entered as the promoted team from the 2016–17 I-League 2nd Division. The season began on 25 November 2017. Minerva Punjab won their first I-League title.

== Teams ==
All India Football Federation invited bids for new teams on 21 July 2017 from Bengaluru, Mumbai, New Delhi, Ranchi, Jaipur, Jodhpur, Bhopal, Lucknow, Ahmedabad, Malappuram and Trivandrum, among others. On 20 September, after second round of bidding invitation, the Bid Evaluation Committee decided to award Sree Gokulam Group the right to field their team in the Hero I-League 2017–18 season onward from Kozhikode, Kerala. Bengaluru FC successfully bid for a place in 2017–18 Indian Super League and thus was not a part of I-League. NEROCA F.C. were promoted for winning 2016–17 I-League 2nd Division. After successful hosting of FIFA U-17 World Cup, AIFF revived Indian Arrows project to field the colts in I-League.

Locations of the 2017–18 I-League teams

=== Stadiums and locations ===
Note: Table lists in alphabetical order.

Team	Location	Stadium	Capacity
Aizawl	Aizawl, Mizoram	Rajiv Gandhi Stadium	20,000
Chennai City	Coimbatore, Tamil Nadu	Jawaharlal Nehru Stadium, Coimbatore	30,000
Churchill Brothers	Salcete, Goa	Tilak Maidan Stadium	6,000
East Bengal	Kolkata, West Bengal	Salt Lake Stadium; Barasat Stadium	66,000
East Bengal	Kolkata, West Bengal	Salt Lake Stadium; Barasat Stadium	22,000
Indian Arrows	Delhi, New Delhi; Bambolim, Goa	Ambedkar Stadium; GMC Bambolim Athletic Stadium	35,000
Indian Arrows	Delhi, New Delhi; Bambolim, Goa	Ambedkar Stadium; GMC Bambolim Athletic Stadium	6,500
Gokulam Kerala	Kozhikode, Kerala	EMS Stadium	54,000
Minerva Punjab	Ludhiana, Punjab	Guru Nanak Stadium	15,000
Mohun Bagan	Kolkata, West Bengal	Salt Lake Stadium; Barasat Stadium; Mohun Bagan Ground	66,687
Mohun Bagan	Kolkata, West Bengal	Salt Lake Stadium; Barasat Stadium; Mohun Bagan Ground	22,000
Mohun Bagan	Kolkata, West Bengal	Salt Lake Stadium; Barasat Stadium; Mohun Bagan Ground	22,000
NEROCA	Imphal, Manipur	Khuman Lampak Main Stadium	30,000
Shillong Lajong	Shillong, Meghalaya	Jawaharlal Nehru Stadium	30,000

=== Personnel and kits ===
Team	Head coach	Kit manufacturer	Shirt sponsor
Aizawl	(India) Santosh Kashyap	Vamos	NE Consultancy Services
Chennai City	(India) V Soundararajan	Counter Sports	None
Churchill Brothers	(Nigeria) Joseph Afusi	Faisports	Churchill Group
East Bengal	(India) Khalid Jamil	PERF	Kingfisher
Gokulam Kerala	(India) Bino George	Kaizen sports	Aachi Group
Indian Arrows	(Portugal) Luís Norton de Matos	Nike	None
Minerva Punjab	(India) Khogen Singh	Astro	Apollo Tyres
Mohun Bagan	(India) Sankarlal Chakraborty	Shiv Naresh	Nilkamal
NEROCA	(India) Gift Raikhan	Vector X	Classic Group of Hotels
Shillong Lajong	(India) Alison Kharsyntiew	Nivia Sports	None

=== Foreign players ===
On 2 August 2017, it was announced by the All India Football Federation that the number of foreigners for each I-League club would go up to six, with two of the six having to be born in Asia or registered with the AFC.

Indian Arrows cannot sign any foreign players as they are the AIFF developmental team.

Club	Foreigner 1	Foreigner 2	Foreigner 3	Foreigner 4	AFC Foreigner 1	AFC Foreigner 2
Aizawl	(Ivory Coast) Léonce Dodoz	(Liberia) Alfred Jaryan	(Nigeria) Kareem Omolaja	(Romania) Andrei Ionescu	(Afghanistan) Masih Saighani	(Japan) Yugo Kobayashi
Chennai City	(France) Jean-Michel Joachim	(Serbia) Aleksandar Rakić	(Slovenia) Uroš Poljanec		(Kyrgyzstan) Venyamin Shumeyko	(South Korea) Kim Dong-hyeon
Churchill Brothers	(The Gambia) Dawda Ceesay	(Nigeria) Francis Onyeama	(Nigeria) Monday Osagie	(Trinidad and Tobago) Willis Plaza	(Kyrgyzstan) Bektur Talgat Uulu	(Lebanon) Hussein Eldor
East Bengal	(Equatorial Guinea) Eduardo Ferreira	(Liberia) Ansumana Kromah	(Nigeria) Dudu Omagbemi		(Japan) Katsumi Yusa	(Syria) Mahmoud Amnah
Gokulam Kerala	(Ghana) Daniel Addo	(Nigeria) Emmanuel Chigozie	(Uganda) Henry Kisekka	(Uganda) Musa Mudde	(Bahrain) Mahmood Al-Ajmi	(Uzbekistan) Gulom Urunov
Minerva Punjab	(Ghana) William Opoku	(Ivory Coast) Bazie Armand	(Ivory Coast) Guy Eric Dano	(France) Kassim Aidara	(Bhutan) Chencho Gyeltshen	(Nepal) Kiran Chemjong
Mohun Bagan	(Cameroon) Aser Pierrick Dipanda	(Lebanon) Akram Moghrabi	(Nepal) Bimal Gharti Magar	(Nigeria) Kingsley Obumneme	(Australia) Cameron Watson	(Japan) Yuta Kinowaki
NEROCA	(Bosnia and Herzegovina) Nedo Turković	(Haiti) Fabien Vorbe	(Liberia) Varney Kallon	(Nigeria) Felix Chidi Odili	(Australia) Nick Ward	(Australia) Aryn Williams
Shillong Lajong	(Equatorial Guinea) Lawrence Doe	(Ivory Coast) Abdoulaye Koffi	(Nigeria) Daniel Odafin	(The Gambia) Saihou Jagne	(South Korea) Oh Joo-ho	

== League table ==
Pos	Team	Pld	W	D	L	GF	GA	GD	Pts	Qualification or relegation
1	Minerva Punjab (C)	18	11	2	5	24	16	+8	35	Qualification to 2019 AFC Champions League qualifier
2	NEROCA	18	9	5	4	20	13	+7	32	
3	Mohun Bagan	18	8	7	3	28	14	+14	31	
4	East Bengal	18	8	7	3	32	19	+13	31	
5	Aizawl	18	6	6	6	21	18	+3	24	
6	Shillong Lajong	18	6	4	8	17	25	−8	22	
7	Gokulam Kerala	18	6	3	9	17	23	−6	21	
8	Chennai City	18	4	7	7	15	24	−9	19	
9	Churchill Brothers (Note: Churchill Brothers were relegated, but reinstated after the appeal.)	18	5	2	11	17	28	−11	17	
10	Indian Arrows (Note: Indian Arrows were exempted from relegation, as they are an AIFF developmental team.)	18	4	3	11	13	24	−11	15	

Source: i-league.org
Rules for classification: 1) points; 2) head-to-head points; 3) head-to-head goal difference; 4) goal difference; 5) number of goals scored; 6) drawing of lots
(C) Champions

=== Results table ===
Home \ Away	AIZ	CHE	CB	KEB	IA	GK	MP	MB	NFC	SHI
Aizawl	—	2–0	1–0	0–0	3–0	3–1	2–1	1–1	1–2	0–1
Chennai City	1–1	—	3–1	1–2	0–0	0–1	2–1	0–0	0–0	0–0
Churchill Brothers	1–0	0–2	—	1–1	2–0	1–1	2–1	1–2	0–1	2–0
East Bengal	2–2	7–1	3–2	—	1–0	1–0	2–2	0–2	1–1	5–1
Indian Arrows	2–2	3–0	2–1	0–2	—	0–2	0–2	0–2	0–2	3–0
Gokulam Kerala	0–2	1–1	2–3	2–1	0–1	—	0–1	1–1	0–3	3–2
Minerva Punjab	2–0	2–1	1–0	0–1	1–0	0–1	—	1–1	2–1	3–2
Mohun Bagan	2–0	1–2	5–0	1–0	1–1	1–2	1–2	—	0–0	1–1
NEROCA	0–0	2–1	1–0	1–1	2–1	1–0	0–1	2–3	—	0–2
Shillong Lajong	2–1	0–0	2–0	2–2	1–0	1–0	0–1	0–3	0–1	—

Source: I-League
Legend: Blue = home team win; Yellow = draw; Red = away team win.

== Season statistics ==
=== Scoring ===
As of 8 March 2018

==== Top scorers ====
Rank	Player	Club	Goals
1	(Cameroon) Aser Pierrick Dipanda	Mohun Bagan	13
2	(Nigeria) Dudu Omagbemi	East Bengal	8
3	(Bhutan) Chencho Gyeltshen	Minerva Punjab	7
3	(Nigeria) Felix Chidi Odili	NEROCA	7
5	(Japan) Katsumi Yusa	East Bengal	6
6	(France) Jean-Michel Joachim	Chennai City	5
6	(Ghana) William Opoku	Minerva Punjab	5
8	(Japan) Yugo Kobayashi	Aizawl	4
8	(Ivory Coast) Mechac Koffi	Churchill Brothers	4
8	(India) Abhijit Sarkar	Indian Arrows	4
8	(India) Subhash Singh	NEROCA	4
8	(Ivory Coast) Abdoulaye Koffi	Shillong Lajong	4
8	(Ivory Coast) Léonce Dodoz Zikahi	Aizawl	4
8	(Lebanon) Akram Moghrabi	Mohun Bagan	4
8	(Uganda) Henry Kisekka	Gokulam Kerala	4

==== Top Indian scorers ====
Rank	Player	Club	Goals
1	Abhijit Sarkar	Indian Arrows	4
1	Subhash Singh	NEROCA	4
3	Laldanmawia Ralte	East Bengal	3
3	Bali Gagandeep	Minerva Punjab	3
3	Lalkhawpuimawia	Aizawl	3
3	Michael Soosairaj	Chennai City	3
3	Samuel Lalmuanpuia	Shillong Lajong	3
8	William Lalnunfela	Aizawl	2
8	Aniket Jadhav	Indian Arrows	2
8	Ronald Singh	NEROCA	2
8	Redeem Tlang	Shillong Lajong	2
8	Rahul Praveen	Indian Arrows	2
8	Jobby Justin	East Bengal	2
8	Sheikh Faiaz	Mohun Bagan	2
8	Kivi Zhimomi	Gokulam Kerala	2

==== Hat-tricks ====
Player	For	Against	Result	Date	Ref
(Nigeria) Dudu Omagbemi^{4}	East Bengal	Chennai City	7–0	24 February 2018	

^{4} Player scored 4 goals.

=== Clean sheets ===
As of 8 March 2018

Rank	Player	Club	Clean sheets
1	(India) Shilton Paul	Mohun Bagan	8
2	(India) Avilash Paul	Aizawl	6
3	(India) Phurba Lachenpa	Shillong Lajong	5
3	(Slovenia) Uroš Poljanec	Chennai City	5
3	(India) Bishorjit Singh	NEROCA	5
6	(India) Lalit Thapa	NEROCA	4
6	(India) Rakshit Dagar	Minerva Punjab	4
8	(India) Luis Barreto	East Bengal	3
8	(India) James Kithan	Churchill Brothers	3
8	(Nepal) Kiran Chemjong	Minerva Punjab	3
11	(India) Dheeraj Singh	Indian Arrows	2
11	(India) Prabhsukhan Singh Gill	Indian Arrows	2
11	(India) Nidhin Lal	Shillong Lajong	2
11	(India) Ubaid C K	East Bengal	2
11	(India) Bilal Husain Khan	Gokulam Kerala	2

== Attendance ==
=== Average home attendances ===
As of 8 March 2018

Team	GP	Cumulative	High	Low	Mean
NEROCA	9	192,438	35,285	11,020	21,382
East Bengal	9	156,295	52,951	8,692	17,366
Mohun Bagan	9	142,421	64,360	4,360	15,825
Gokulam Kerala	9	73,177	25,841	621	8,131
Chennai City	9	73,739	14,751	3,082	8,194
Minerva Punjab	9	51,627	8,243	3,845	5,736
Shillong Lajong	9	49,086	7,880	3,000	5,454
Aizawl	9	38,297	7,280	2,800	4,256
Indian Arrows	9	29,300	5,563	218	3,256
Churchill Brothers	9	26,285	3,437	2,400	2,921
Total	90	832,665	64,360	218	10,280

=== Highest attendances ===
Rank	Home team	Score	Away team	Attendance	Date	Stadium
1	Mohun Bagan	1–0	East Bengal	64,360	3 December 2017	Vivekananda Yuba Bharati Krirangan
2	East Bengal	0–2	Mohun Bagan	52,951	21 January 2018	Salt Lake Stadium
3	NEROCA	2–1	Indian Arrows	35,285	5 January 2018	Khuman Lampak Main Stadium
4	NEROCA	1–1	East Bengal	28,243	30 December 2017	Khuman Lampak Main Stadium
5	NEROCA	2–1	Chennai City	27,633	15 December 2017	Khuman Lampak Main Stadium
6	East Bengal	1–1	NEROCA	26,900	8 March 2018	Salt Lake Stadium
7	Gokulam Kerala	1–1	Chennai City	25,841	4 December 2017	EMS Stadium
8	NEROCA	0–0	Aizawl	20,345	10 February 2018	Khuman Lampak Main Stadium
9	Mohun Bagan	1–2	Chennai City	18,316	2 January 2018	Mohun Bagan Ground
10	NEROCA	1–0	Gokulam Kerala	17,300	4 February 2018	Khuman Lampak Main Stadium

== Awards ==
=== Hero of the Match ===
Match	Hero of the Match		Match	Hero of the Match		Match	Hero of the Match	
Match	Player	Club	Match	Player	Club	Match	Player	Club
1	(Haiti) Sony Norde	Mohun Bagan	31	(Syria) Mahmoud Amnah	East Bengal	61	(Lebanon) Akram Moghrabi	Mohun Bagan
2	(India) Alen Deory	Shillong Lajong	32	(Timor-Leste) Murilo de Almeida	Chennai City	62	(Liberia) Varney Kallon	NEROCA
3	(Japan) Katsumi Yusa	East Bengal	33	(India) Subhash Singh	NEROCA	63	(India) Prabhsukhan Singh Gill	Indian Arrows
4	(India) Aniket Jadhav	Indian Arrows	34	(Slovenia) Uroš Poljanec	Chennai City	64	(Nigeria) Monday Osagie	Churchill Brothers
5	(Bhutan) Chencho Gyeltshen	Minerva Punjab	35	(India) Bali Gagandeep	Minerva Punjab	65	(India) Bali Gagandeep	Minerva Punjab
6	(India) Hardy Nongbri	Shillong Lajong	36	(Cameroon) Aser Pierrick Dipanda	Mohun Bagan	66	(France) Jean-Michel Joachim	Chennai City
7	(Nigeria) Kingsley Obumneme	Mohun Bagan	37	(Ivory Coast) Abdoulaye Koffi	Shillong Lajong	67	(India) Lalram Hmunmawia	Aizawl
8	(India) Nikhil Bernard	Gokulam Kerala	38	(Ivory Coast) Mechac Koffi	Churchill Brothers	68	(India) Anwar Ali	Indian Arrows
9	(Ghana) William Opoku	Minerva Punjab	39	(India) Michael Soosairaj	Chennai City	69	(Kyrgyzstan) Venyamin Shumeyko	Chennai City
10	(Nigeria) Felix Chidi Odili	NEROCA	40	(Bhutan) Chencho Gyeltshen	Minerva Punjab	70	(Cameroon) Aser Pierrick Dipanda	Mohun Bagan
11	(India) Laldanmawia Ralte	East Bengal	41	(India) Abhijit Sarkar	Indian Arrows	71	(Syria) Mahmoud Amnah	East Bengal
12	(Cameroon) Aser Pierrick Dipanda	Mohun Bagan	42	(India) David Lalrinmuana	Aizawl	72	(Liberia) Varney Kallon	NEROCA
13	(Senegal) Kassim Aidara	Minerva Punjab	43	(India) Rakshit Dagar	Minerva Punjab	73	(India) Edmund Lalrindika	Indian Arrows
14	(Afghanistan) Masih Saighani	Aizawl	44	(Nigeria) Ogba Kalu Nnanna	Churchill Brothers	74	(India) Bilal Husain Khan	Gokulam Kerala
15	(India) Sheikh Faiaz	Mohun Bagan	45	(India) Avilash Paul	Aizawl	75	(India) Michael Soosairaj	Chennai City
16	(India) Lalit Thapa	NEROCA	46	(Liberia) Varney Kallon	NEROCA	76	(India) Subhash Singh	NEROCA
17	(India) James Kithan	Churchill Brothers	47	(Nigeria) Monday Osagie	Churchill Brothers	77	(Sweden) Saihou Jagne	Shillong Lajong
18	(India) Redeem Tlang	Shillong Lajong	48	(Nigeria) Felix Chidi Odili	NEROCA	78	(Uganda) Henry Kisekka	Gokulam Kerala
19	(India) Dheeraj Singh Moirangthem	Indian Arrows	49	(India) Santu Singh	Gokulam Kerala	79	(India) Lalkhawpuimawia	Aizawl
20	(India) Rana Gharami	Mohun Bagan	50	(Cameroon) Aser Pierrick Dipanda	Mohun Bagan	80	(Nigeria) Dudu Omagbemi	East Bengal
21	(France) Jean-Michel Joachim	Chennai City	51	(India) Prabhsukhan Singh Gill	Indian Arrows	81	(India) Arjun Jayaraj	Gokulam Kerala
22	(Ghana) Daniel Addo	Gokulam Kerala	52	(Ivory Coast) Abdoulaye Koffi	Shillong Lajong	82	(Ivory Coast) Guy Eric Dano	Minerva Punjab
23	(Slovenia) Uroš Poljanec	Chennai City	53	(Ivory Coast) Leonce Dodoz Zikahi	Aizawl	83	(Cameroon) Aser Pierrick Dipanda	Mohun Bagan
24	(India) Phurba Lachenpa	Shillong Lajong	54	(Bhutan) Chencho Gyeltshen	Minerva Punjab	84	(Ivory Coast) Leonce Dodoz Zikahi	Aizawl
25	(India) Jitendra Singh	Indian Arrows	55	(India) Prabhsukhan Singh Gill	Indian Arrows	85	(India) Michael Soosairaj	Chennai City
26	(Ivory Coast) Leonce Dodoz Zikahi	Aizawl	56	(Bahrain) Mahmood Al-Ajmi	Gokulam Kerala	86	(India) Nikhil Kadam	Mohun Bagan
27	(India) Mohammed Rafique	East Bengal	57	(Nepal) Kiran Chemjong	Minerva Punjab	87	(India) Nidhin Lal	Shillong Lajong
28	(India) Dheeraj Singh Moirangthem	Indian Arrows	58	(Nigeria) Felix Chidi Odili	NEROCA	88	(India) Nikhil Bernard	Gokulam Kerala
29	(Equatorial Guinea) Eduardo Ferreira	East Bengal	59	(India) Wayne Vaz	Churchill Brothers	89	(India) Ricardo Cardozo	Churchill Brothers
30	(Romania) Andrei Ionescu	Aizawl	60	(India) Michael Soosairaj	Chennai City	90	(India) Lalit Thapa	NEROCA

=== Season awards ===
Hero I-League 2017–18 awards were announced on March 22.

Award	Recipient
Best Goalkeeper	Shilton Paul (Mohun Bagan)
Jarnail Singh Award for Best Defender	Varney Kallon (NEROCA)
Best Midfielder	Michael Soosairaj (Chennai City FC)
Best Forward	Chencho Gyeltshen (Minerva Punjab)
Highest Scorer	Aser Pierrick Dipanda (Mohun Bagan)
Best Emerging Player (U-22)	Samuel Lalmuanpuia (Shillong Lajong)
Syed Abdul Rahim Award for Best Coach	Gift Raikhan (NEROCA)
Best Organizers	NEROCA
Fairplay award	NEROCA

== See also ==
- 2017–18 Indian Super League
- 2018 Indian Super Cup
