= Kim Dong-hyeon =

- Hangul: 김동현
- RR: Gim Donghyeon
- MR: Kim Tonghyŏn

Kim Dong-hyeon, Kim Dong-hyun or Kim Tong-hyŏn may also refer to:

- Dong Hyun Kim (born 1981), South Korean mixed martial arts fighter
- Kim Dong-hyun (bobsledder) (born 1987), South Korean bobsledder
- Kim Dong-hyun (footballer, born 1984), South Korean football player
- Kim Dong-hyun (footballer, born 1997), South Korean football player
- Kim Dong-hyun (tennis) (born 1978), South Korean tennis player
- Kim Dong-hyeon (footballer, born 1994), South Korean football player
- Kim Dong-hyeon (luger) (born 1991), South Korean luger
- Kim Dong-hyun (actor) (born 1989), leader of South Korean boy band Boyfriend
- Kim Dong-hyeon (born 1998), birth name of the singer MC Gree
- Kim Dong-hyun (singer, born 1998), member of South Korean duo MXM and AB6IX
- Dong Hyun Kim (fighter, born 1988), mixed martial artist
