= Onyeama Francis Okechukwu =

Nigerian professional footballer

Onyeama Francis okechukwu
Personal information
- Full name: Onyeama Francis Okechukwu
- Date of birth: 13 April 1991 (age 35)
- Place of birth: Aba, Nigeria
- Height: 1.73 m (5 ft 8 in)
- Position: Forward

Team information
- Current team: Churchill Brothers.
- Number: 3

Senior career*
Years	Team	Apps	(Gls)
- Okwu United FC
- Perfect United FC
- Southern Samity
- Dynamo Sports Club
- Railway FC
- United Sports Club
- Tezpur United FC
- Sunrise Athletic Club
- Tuff Laxmi Prasad Sports Club
- Hindustan Eagles FC
- Ramhlun North FC
- Arrows Football Club
- Peerless
- * Club domestic league appearances and goals

Onyeama Francis Okechukwu is a Nigerian professional footballer who currently plays for Churchill Brothers in the I-League.

== Personal life and career ==
Francis was born in Nigeria on 13 April 1991. He started his career in the youth team in Nigeria.

Francis Okechukwu came to India. He has played for clubs like Southern Samity, Railway FC, United S.C., and Peerless in the Calcutta Football League and I-League 2nd Division. He also represented Tezpur United FC and Sunrise Athletic Club in the Assam Football League. He also played for Hindustan Eagles FC in Chennai.

In 2018, he signed for Churchill Brothers in the 2017-18 I-League Season. He scored in the debut game against Gokulam FC and helped the team to draw against Gokulam FC.
