= Chesterpoul Lyngdoh =

Indian footballer (born 1997)

Chesterpaul Lyngdoh
Personal information
- Full name: Chesterpaul Lyngdoh
- Date of birth: 23 September 1997 (age 29)
- Place of birth: Meghalaya, India
- Position: Midfielder

Youth career
- Nangkiew Irat
- 2014–2016: Pune

Senior career*
Years	Team	Apps	(Gls)
2016–2017	Pune City	0	(0)
2016–2017	→ Churchill Brothers (loan)	15	(3)
2017–2018	Mohun Bagan A.C.	3	(0)
2018	Pune City 'B'	8	(3)
2018–2019	Churchill Brothers	10	(0)
2019–2021	Real Kashmir	21	(2)
2021	Ryntih	3	(0)
2021–2022	Sudeva Delhi		
2022	Rangdajied United	7	(0)
2022–2025	Bengaluru United		
2026	Nongkseh		
- * Club domestic league appearances and goals

Chesterpaul Lyngdoh is an Indian professional footballer who plays as a midfielder.

== Career ==
=== Early career ===
Born in Meghalaya, Lyngdoh began his footballing career playing for his school team in the Subroto Cup. He was then part of the youth set-up of local Shillong-based club Nangkiew Irat, playing for them in the local state under-19 league. After impressing in the under-19 league, Lyngdoh was selected to join the Pune F.C. Academy.

==== Churchill Brothers (loan) ====
After the Pune F.C. Academy was bought out by Indian Super League side Pune City, Lyngdoh was loaned out to Churchill Brothers, who then played in the Goa Professional League. He played for the club during the 2016 GPL season. He was then included in the squad for Churchill Brothers' upcoming I-League season. He made his professional debut for the club on 18 January 2017 in the league against East Bengal. He came on as an 88th-minute substitute for Brandon Fernandes as Churchill Brothers lost 2–0. The 19-year-old played a total of 1121 minutes for Churchill Brothers and scored three goals, two of them were the winners against Bengaluru FC and Mohun Bagan.

=== Mohun Bagan ===
In July 2017, Mohun Bagan signed lyngdoh for the upcoming Calcutta Football League and i-League seasons. He made his debut for the club in the 2017–18 Calcutta Premier Division match against Southern Samity.He scored his first goal for the club in a 3–0 win against Railway fc. Later he started for Bagan in their 2017–18 I-League season opener match against Minerva Punjab. However he only made 3 appearances for the club and eventually he was released after the I-League season.

=== Pune City'B' / Pune City ===
In March 2018 he returned to Pune City. He was included in the Pune City Reserves squad for the 2017–18 I-League 2nd Division. He made his debut for the club in a 0–0 draw against Real Kashmir. He scored three goals from 6 matches which includes a brace against Lonestar Kashmir. His performance for the reserve side caught the eyes of Pune City head coach Ranko Popovic and was included in the first team's squad for 2018 Indian Super Cup.

Lyngdoh made his debut for the first team of Pune city on 4 April 2018 coming on as a 74th-minute substitute for Ashique Kuruniyan against Shillong lajong; Pune city lost 2–3.

=== Churchill Brothers ===
In 2019 season he joined Churchill brothers. He was included in the Churchill' squad for 2018–19 Goa Professional League. However, in the middle of the season first team coach Petre Gigiu included him into the I-League squad. He made a total of 10 Appearances for the club in the 2018–19 I-League Season.

== Career statistics ==
As of 29 January 2024

Club	Season	League			League Cup		Domestic Cup		Continental		Total	
Club	Season	Division	Apps	Goals	Apps	Goals	Apps	Goals	Apps	Goals	Apps	Goals
Churchill Brothers (loan)	2016–17	I-League	15	3	—	—	3 (Note: Appearances in the 2016–17 Indian Federation Cup)	0	—	—	18	3
Mohun Bagan	2017–18	I-League	3	0	—	—	0	0	—	—	3	0
Pune City'B'	2017–18	I-League 2	8	3	—	—	0	0	—	—	8	3
Pune City	2017–18	ISL	0	0	1 (Note: Appearances in the 2018 Indian Super Cup)	0	0	0	—	—	1	0
Churchill Brothers	2018–19	I-League	10	0	—	—	0	0	—	—	10	0
Real Kashmir FC	2019–20	I-League	12	0	—	—	3 (Note: Appearances in the 2019 Durand Cup)	2	—	—	15	2
Real Kashmir FC	2020–21	I-League	9	1	—	—	0	0	—	—	9	1
Rynith FC	2021	I-League 2	3	0	—	—	0	0	—	—	3	0
Sudeva Delhi	2021–22	I-League	7	0	–—	—	0	0	—	—	7	0
Bengaluru United	2023-24	I-League 2	2	2	–—	–—	0	0	–—	–—	2	2
Career total			69	9	1	0	6	2	0	0	76	11

== Honours ==
Real Kashmir

- IFA Shield: 2020
