= Varney Kallon =

Liberian footballer

Personal information
- Full name: Varney Kallon Kiatamba Junior
- Date of birth: 24 April 1993 (age 33)
- Place of birth: Liberia
- Height: 1.84 m (6 ft 0 in)
- Position: Center-back

Team information
- Current team: Calcutta Customs

Senior career*
Years	Team	Apps	(Gls)
- Haja
- Karn United
2012	LPRC Oilers		
2013–2015	Chin United		
2015–2016	Vasco		
2016–2019	NEROCA	35	(3)
2019	→ Peerless (on loan)	6	(0)
2021–	Calcutta Customs	2	(0)

International career
2017	Liberia	1	(0)
- * Club domestic league appearances and goals

Varney Kallon Kiatamba Jr. (born 24 April 1993) is a Liberian professional footballer who plays as a center-back for Calcutta Customs.

== Career ==
Born in Liberia, Kallon began his career with Liberian Second Division League side Haja Football Club before moving to Karn United. He soon then moved to first division side LPRC Oilers. In 2013, Kallon decided to move abroad to Myanmar and signed for MNL-2 side Chin United. While with Chin United, Kallon helped the club earn promotion to the Myanmar National League.

After helping Chin United earn promotion, Kallon travelled to Kerala in India on the request of footballer Eric Brown to renew his visa. He soon then moved to India permanently and signed for Vasco of the I-League 2nd Division and Goa Professional League. He spent a season with Vasco before fellow African footballer Chika Wali recommended Kallon to I-League 2nd Division club NEROCA. He soon then signed for the club in 2016.

While with the club, Kallon participated in the Durand Cup and the Manipur State League. In May 2017, Kallon helped NEROCA earn promotion to the I-League.

On 1 December 2017, Kallon made his professional debut for NEROCA in the I-League against Minerva Punjab. He started and played the whole match as NEROCA lost 2–1. Two weeks later, Kallon scored his first goal in the league for the club against Chennai City. His goal was the first in a 2–1 victory. Kallon then scored the only goal for NEROCA in a 1–0 victory over Gokulam Kerala. At the end of the season, after leading NEROCA to a second-place finish in their debut season, Kallon was adjudged as the I-League's Best Defender of the Season. After the season ended, it was announced that Kallon had signed a new contract with NEROCA, keeping him with the club till 2020.

== International ==
On 5 June 2017, Kallon made his international debut for Liberia in a friendly against Sierra Leone. He started the match as Liberia won 1–0.

== Professional career statistics ==
As of 19 April 2018

Club	Season	League			Cup		Continental		Total	
Club	Season	Division	Apps	Goals	Apps	Goals	Apps	Goals	Apps	Goals
NEROCA	2017–18	I-League	18	2	2	0	—	—	20	2
NEROCA	2018–19	I-League	0	0	0	0	—	—	0	0
Career total			18	2	2	0	0	0	20	2

=== International ===
As of 5 June 2017

Liberia national team
Year	Apps	Goals
2017	1	0
Total	1	0

== Honors ==
Chin United

- Myanmar National League 2: 2013

Peerless

- Calcutta Premier Division A: 2019–20

Individual

- 2017–18 I-League – Jarnail Singh Award for Best Defender
