= Nikhil Bernard =

Indian footballer

Personal information
- Date of birth: 30 December 1989 (age 36)
- Place of birth: Bangalore, Karnataka, India
- Height: 1.78 m (5 ft 10 in)
- Position: Goalkeeper

Team information
- Current team: SC Bengaluru (GK coach)

Senior career*
| Years | Team | Apps | (Gls) |
| 2012–2016 | Royal Wahingdoh | 12 | (0) |
| 2016 | Bengaluru FC | | |
| 2016 | Ozone FC | 5 | (0) |
| 2017–2018 | Gokulam Kerala FC | | |
| 2018–2019 | Chennaiyin | | |
- * Club domestic league appearances and goals

Nikhil Bernard (born 30 December 1989) is an Indian former professional footballer who last played as a goalkeeper for Chennaiyin FC in the Indian Super League.

== Career ==
=== Royal Wahingdoh ===
Born in Bangalore, Karnataka, Bernard started his career with Royal Wahingdoh F.C. of the Shillong Premier League and I-League 2nd Division. In 2014, he helped Wahingdoh to promotion to the I-League.

He made his professional debut for the side on 28 December 2014 in the Federation Cup against Mumbai.

=== Bengaluru FC ===
On 2 February 2016, he signed for the home town club Bengaluru FC.

=== Ozone FC ===
After brief stint with Bengaluru FC, Bernard joined newly formed Bengaluru based I-League 2nd division club, Ozone FC.

== Career statistics ==
As of 20 May 2015

| Club | Season | League | | | Federation Cup | | Durand Cup | | AFC | | Total | |
| Club | Season | Division | Apps | Goals | Apps | Goals | Apps | Goals | Apps | Goals | Apps | Goals |
|---|---|---|---|---|---|---|---|---|---|---|---|---|
| Royal Wahingdoh | 2014–15 | I-League | 12 | 0 | 1 | 0 | 0 | 0 | — | — | 13 | 0 |
| Royal Wahingdoh | Total | | 12 | 0 | 1 | 0 | 0 | 0 | — | — | 13 | 0 |
| Gokulam Kerala FC | 2017–18 | I-League | 5 | 0 | 0 | 0 | 0 | 0 | — | — | 5 | 0 |
| Gokulam Kerala FC | Total | | 5 | 0 | 0 | 0 | 0 | 0 | — | — | 5 | 0 |
| Career Total | | | 17 | 0 | 1 | 0 | 0 | 0 | 0 | 0 | 18 | 0 |
