= Uroš Poljanec =

Slovenian footballer

Personal information
- Date of birth: 23 August 1991 (age 35)
- Place of birth: Maribor, Slovenia
- Height: 1.87 m (6 ft 2 in)
- Position: Goalkeeper

Youth career
- –2010: Maribor
- 2007–2008: → Aluminij (loan)
- 2008–2009: → Pohorje (loan)

Senior career*
Years	Team	Apps	(Gls)
2010–2012	Aluminij	4	(0)
2012–2013	Pohorje		
2013–2014	Limbuš-Pekre		
2014	Lenart	13	(0)
2015	USV Ragnitz	2	(0)
2015–2016	Khoromkhon		
2016	Fjarðabyggðar	8	(0)
2017–2018	Chennai City	13	(0)
2018–2020	Fužinar	33	(0)
2020	Ypsonas	3	(0)
2021	Međimurje	1	(0)
2021–2022	Drava Ptuj	13	(0)
2022	Foresta Suceava	0	(0)
2022	Vinodol		
2023	SV Tobelbad	3	(0)
2023-	NK Pesnica		

International career
2009	Slovenia U19	1	(0)
- * Club domestic league appearances and goals as of 06:51, 21 June 2022 (UTC)

Uroš Poljanec (born 23 August 1991) is a Slovenian professional footballer who plays as a goalkeeper. Besides Slovenia, he has played in Austria, Mongolia, Iceland, Cyprus, Romania, and India.

== Club career ==
In 2015, Poljanec was noticed by an agent who was pursuing players to sign for Mongolian championship contenders Khoromkhon. As the club were in clamant need of a goalkeeper, the agent offered him a contract, which he accepted, becoming the first Slovenian to play in Mongolia as a result. Poljanec helped his team to four victories, two draws and two defeats in eight rounds during his stay there. Poljanec also made two appearances in the 2016 AFC Cup qualifying round in a 1–0 loss to K-Electric and a goalless draw with Druk United through August 2015.

In 2016, he signed for Fjarðabyggðar.

In November 2017, Poljanec signed for the I-League club Chennai City. He played 13 matches for the Chennai-based side and had 5 clean sheets.

In 2018, he signed for Fužinar.

In 2020, he signed for Ypsonas FC.

In 2021, he signed for Međimurje.

In 2022, he signed for Foresta Suceava. After that, he signed for Vinodol.
