= Shekh Faiaz =

Indian footballer

Personal information
- Full name: Shekh Faiaz
- Date of birth: 3 March 1995 (age 31)
- Place of birth: Makardaha, Howrah, West Bengal, India
- Position: Winger

Team information
- Current team: Thrissur Magic

Youth career
- Eastern Railway

Senior career*
Years	Team	Apps	(Gls)
2015–2017	Mohammedan	15	(2)
2017–2018	Mohun Bagan	18	(2)
2018	→ Mohammedan (loan)	1	(0)
2018–2019	ATK	0	(0)
2018–2019	→ Mohun Bagan (loan)	13	(0)
2019–2020	Mohun Bagan	4	(0)
2020–2024	Mohammedan	52	(7)
2025–	Thrissur Magic		
- * Club domestic league appearances and goals as of 23:32, 11 March 2023 (UTC)

Shekh Faiaz (born 3 March 1995), also known as S.K. Faiaz, is an Indian professional footballer who plays as a winger for the Super League Kerala club Thrissur Magic.

== Career ==
Faiaz was registered by Mohammedan in July 2017 before the 2017–18 Calcutta Premier Division. On 20 August 2017, Faiaz scored a brace for Mohammedan against Southern Samity.

After the local season with Mohammedan, Faiaz joined Mohun Bagan in the I-League. He made his debut for the club on 25 November 2017 in their opening match against Minerva Punjab. He came on as a 66th-minute substitute for Chesterpoul Lyngdoh as Mohun Bagan drew 1–1.

== Career statistics ==
=== Club ===
As of 11 March 2023

Club	Season	League			Cup		AFC		Other		Total	
Club	Season	Division	Apps	Goals	Apps	Goals	Apps	Goals	Apps	Goals	Apps	Goals
Mohammedan	2015–16	I-League 2nd Division	9	1	0	0	—		—		9	1
Mohammedan	2016–17	I-League 2nd Division	6	1	0	0	—		9 (Note: Appearance(s) in Calcutta Football League)	4	15	5
Mohammedan	Mohammedan total		15	2	0	0	0	0	9	4	24	6
Mohun Bagan	2017–18	I-League	18	2	3 (Note: Appearance(s) in Super Cup)	1	—		—		21	3
Mohammedan (loan)	2017–18	I-League 2nd Division	1	0	0	0	—		—		1	0
ATK	2018–19	Indian Super League	0	0	0	0	—		—		0	0
Mohun Bagan (loan)	2018–19	I-League	13	0	0	0	—		—		13	0
Mohun Bagan	2019–20	I-League	4	0	2 (Note: Appearance(s) in Durand Cup)	0	—		—		6	0
Mohammedan	2020	I-League 2nd Division	4	1	0	0	—		—		4	1
Mohammedan	2020–21	I-League	8	0	0	0	—		—		8	0
Mohammedan	2021–22	I-League	18	3	6	0	—		—		24	3
Mohammedan	2022–23	I-League	22	3	6	2	—		—		28	5
Mohammedan	Mohammedan total		52	7	12	2	0	0	0	0	64	9
Career total			102	11	17	3	0	0	9	4	128	18

== Honours ==
Mohammedan Sporting

- Calcutta Football League: 2021
- I-League runner-up: 2021–22
