= Guy Eric Dano =

Ivorian professional footballer

Personal information
- Full name: Guy Eric Dano
- Date of birth: 2 August 1989 (age 37)
- Place of birth: Ivory Coast
- Height: 1.87 m (6 ft 1 1/2 in)
- Position: Defender

Team information
- Current team: Rainbow A.C

Senior career*
Years	Team	Apps	(Gls)
2015	jeunesse Club d'Abidjan		
2016– 2018	Minerva Punjab	18	(1)
2018–	Rainbow AC	3	(1)
- * Club domestic league appearances and goals as of 09:09, 1 August 2018 (UTC)

Guy Eric Dano (born 2 April 1989) is an Ivorian professional footballer who plays as a defender for Calcutta Football League side Rainbow AC.

== Career ==
=== Club ===
Guy Eric Dano's career began in Côte dé Ivory Professional League with top division of the Ivorian Football Federation club jeunesse Club d'Abidjan in 2015. who boost the likes of former Côte d'Ivoire goalkeeper Vincent Angban and Guinea international striker Demba Camara. He is generally strong as a left footer.

Later he came to India to join the I-League side Minerva Punjab in 2017. He played a total of 18 matches for the club and scored 1 goal.

In 2018, he signed for Calcutta Football League side New Barrackpore Rainbow.

== Honours ==
Minerva Punjab

- I-League: 2017–18
