= Santosh Kumar (referee) =

Indian football referee (born 1975)

- Full name: Muringothumalil Santosh Kumar
- Born: 12 May 1975 (age 51); Kottayam, Kerala, India
- Other occupation: Auto rickshaw driver

Domestic
Years	League	Role
2014–	Indian Super League	Referee

International
Years	League	Role

Muringothumalil Santosh Kumar (born 12 May 1975) is an Indian professional football referee who officiates primarily in the I-League and Indian Super League.

In 2012 it was announced that Kumar would be one of three referees in India to be made professional by the All India Football Federation.

== Personal life and career ==
Born in Kerala, Kumar grew up in a village that was very passionate about football. He played for small local clubs, earning Rs. 200 per match. Eventually though, due to injury and financial problems, Kumar had to give up playing football, instead, focusing on refereeing the game. He started out as a referee in the 1990s for local village games. He passed his written and physical exam for refereeing in 1996. Kumar started to referee matches at the local and regional levels but also took up other jobs in order to pay his bills after passing his exam.

In 2004 Kumar became a national level referee, however, due to work commitments, could never officiate in all the matches to which he was assigned due to work commitments. However, in 2012, it was announced Kumar, along with C.R. Srikrishna and Pratap Singh, would become professional referees with the All India Football Federation and thus would earn more money than before.

Kumar refereed his first match as a professional on 7 October 2012 in a match between Sporting Goa and East Bengal. He drew two yellow cards - one for each side - as the match ended 0–0.

Kumar also refereed the match between Bayern Munich and India in which Bayern Munich won 4–0.

On 13 February 2015, it was announced that Kumar had won the award for the AIFF Best Referee of the Year for 2014. In response, Kumar said "We have tried to perform well on the field. I enjoy Referring. I would like to thank AIFF and the Kerala Football Association for all their support. I would also like to thank all my colleagues".
