= Moinuddin Khan (footballer) =

Indian footballer

Personal information
- Full name: Moinuddin Khan
- Date of birth: April 14, 1997 (age 29)
- Place of birth: Indore, Madhya Pradesh, India
- Position: Forward

Senior career*
Years	Team	Apps	(Gls)
2016–2017	Minerva Punjab	5	
2017–2018	Minerva Punjab	16	(1)
2018	Mohun Bagan		
2018–2020	Minerva Punjab	21	(1)
2021–2022	Himalayan Sherpa Club		

International career
2015	India U19		
- * Club domestic league appearances and goals

Moinuddin Khan (born April 14, 1997) is an Indian professional footballer who plays as a forward.

== Career ==
=== Minerva Punjab ===
Moinuddin Khan began gis professional club career with Minerva Academy FC (later known as Minerva Punjab) in 2016. Khan was part of the team that took in its first major tournament, I-League 2nd Division, and were the runners-up for the season. They lost to five-time I-League champions Dempo SC in the final. They were promoted to I-League after an impressive stint at the 2nd Division. They finished their first-ever 2016–17 I-League season at the second last position. They also participated in the 2016 Durand Cup, and came last in the group stage and hence couldn't qualify for the semi-finals.

Khan perfectly introduced himself to the Indian Football scene when he scored the equalizer against Mohun Bagan and earned a point for Minerva Punjab when the 2017–18 I-League season kicked off. Khan was really impressive as an attacking outlet for his team and played especially well against the Mariners in both matches.

Khan has proved to be a versatile attacker as he can play as an attacking midfielder as well as a second striker.

=== Mohun Bagan ===
In 2018, he moved to I-League giants Mohun Bagan AC. He appeared in the Calcutta Football League.

=== Return to Minerva ===
Without any league appearance with Mohun Bagan, Khan moved back to Minerva Punjab in 2018. He scored one goal in fifteen league matches of the 2018–19 I-League. The team then achieved third place under guidance of manager Yan Law, in the 2019–20 I-League season.

=== Himalayan Sherpa ===
In November 2021, Khan moved to Nepal and signed with Martyr's Memorial A-Division League side Himalayan Sherpa Club on a season-long deal. He debuted on 20 November in a match against Sankata Boys SC, that ended 1–1.

== Career statistics ==
As of 25 October 2019

Club	Season	League			Federation Cup		Durand Cup		AFC		Total	
Club	Season	Division	Apps	Goals	Apps	Goals	Apps	Goals	Apps	Goals	Apps	Goals
Minerva Punjab FC	2016–17	I-League	5	0	–	–	–	–	–	–	5	0
Minerva Punjab FC	2017–18	I-League	11	1	1	0	–	–	–	–	12	1
Minerva Punjab FC	2018–19	I-League	15	1	1	0	–	-	5	0	21	1
Career total			31	1	1	1	0	0	0	0	38	2

== Honours ==
Minerva Punjab

- I-League: 2017–18
- Punjab State League: 2018
- J&K Invitational Cup: 2018

Mohun Bagan

- Calcutta Football League: 2018–19

== See also ==
- List of Indian football players in foreign leagues
