= Kassim Aidara =

Senegalese footballer

Personal information
- Date of birth: 12 May 1987 (age 39)
- Place of birth: Hamburg, West Germany
- Height: 1.80 m (5 ft 11 in)
- Position: Midfielder

Youth career
- SC Concordia

Senior career*
Years	Team	Apps	(Gls)
2007–2008	Wellington United		
2008–2009	Niendorfer TSV		
2009–2010	USC Paloma		
2010–2011	Lüneburger SK Hansa		
2011–2012	Tallinna Kalev	19	(4)
2012–2014	Sillamäe Kalev	44	(19)
2014–2016	FCI Tallinn	60	(5)
2016–2017	Sillamäe Kalev	35	(5)
2017–2018	Minerva Punjab	18	(2)
2018–2020	East Bengal	32	(3)
- * Club domestic league appearances and goals

Kassim Aidara (born 12 May 1987) is a Senegalese-French former professional footballer who played as a midfielder.

== Career ==
Aidara started his career with Wellington United of New Zealand and subsequently represented lower league German clubs namely Niendorfer TSV, USC Paloma, Lüneburger SK Hansa.

In December 2011, Aidara signed for Estonian club Tallinna Kalev. After having scored four goals for the club, he switched to Sillamäe Kalev of the same country on 31 July 2012. In the 2013 season, he scored 17 goals in 34 matches. He moved to FCI Tallinn in the following year. At the end of the year, he trialled with Vietnamese club Sông Lam Nghệ An. In 2016, he returned to Sillamäe.

Aidara switched clubs and countries on 4 October 2017 and signed for Indian I-League side Minerva Punjab. On 25 November, he made his debut for the club in a 1–1 draw against Mohun Bagan. On 11 December, he scored his first goal for the club in a 2–1 victory against Chennai City. Aidara won the 2017–18 I-League with Minerva Punjab.

Aidara joined East Bengal for the 2018–19 season after the 2017–18 I-League season ended.

== Personal life ==
He is the elder brother of Mohamed Aidara who also is a footballer.

== Honours ==
Individual

- Meistriliiga Player of the Month: August 2013
