= Veniamin Shumeyko =

Kyrgyzstani footballer

Personal information
- Full name: Veniamin Aleksandrovich Shumeyko
- Date of birth: 2 February 1989 (age 37)
- Place of birth: Bishkek, Kyrgyzstan
- Height: 1.87 m (6 ft 2 in)
- Position: Centre-back

Senior career*
Years	Team	Apps	(Gls)
2011−2016	Abdysh-Ata Kant	98	(4)
2016−2017	Alga Bishkek		
2017−2018	Chennai City	17	(1)
2018	UiTM	10	(0)
2019−2020	Becamex Binh Duong	14	(0)
2020−2021	Alga Bishkek	10	(1)
2021–2022	Persikabo 1973	29	(0)
2022–2023	Alga Bishkek	23	(0)
2023–2025	Muras United	26	(1)

International career^{‡}
2009	Kyrgyzstan U23	8	(0)
2011−2018	Kyrgyzstan	3	(0)
- * Club domestic league appearances and goals as of 18 May 2026 ‡ National team caps and goals as of 1 June 2012

Veniamin Aleksandrovich Shumeyko (Russian: Вениамин Александрович Шумейко; born 2 February 1989) is a Kyrgyzstani former professional footballer who played as a centre-back.

== Club career ==
In the initial transfer season of 2021–22 Liga 1, he was officially brought in by Persikabo 1973 after his contract with Becamex Binh Duong ended.

== International career ==
He is a member of the Kyrgyzstan national football team from 2011. He made his debut in the match vs. Uzbekistan, played on 28 July 2011.
