= Kim Dong-hyeon (footballer, born 1994) =

South Korean footballer

Personal information
- Full name: Kim Dong-hyeon
- Date of birth: 14 July 1994 (age 32)
- Place of birth: South Korea
- Height: 1.80 m (5 ft 11 in)
- Position: Midfielder

Team information
- Current team: Chennai City
- Number: 5

Youth career
- 2010–2012: Pohang Steelers
- 2013–2015: Dong-a University

Senior career*
Years	Team	Apps	(Gls)
2016–2017	Pohang Steelers	16	(0)
2017	→Gangneung City FC(loan)	14	(0)
2018	Chennai City	5	(0)
2018	Siheung Citizen	12	(0)
- * Club domestic league appearances and goals as of 3 March 2018

Kim Dong-hyeon (Korean: 김동현; born 14 July 1994) is a South Korean professional footballer who plays as midfielder. He last played for Siheung Citizen FC in the 2018 K3 League Basic.

== Career ==
Born in 1994, Kim is a Pohang Steelers youth product and played there from 2010 to 2012 before moving to Dong-a University team 2013.

=== Pohang Steelers ===
He began his professional club career at the K League Classic side Pohang Steelers in January 2016. The South Korean midfielder has represented Steelers in the 2016 AFC Champions League where he faced teams such as Sydney FC, Guangzhou Evergrande and the Japanese powerhouse Urawa Red Diamonds.

=== Gangneung City ===
In 2017 he signed with Gangneung City FC on loan from Pohang Steelers. He appeared in 14 K3 League matches with Gangneung until his end of loan.

=== Chennai City ===
In February 2018 he joined I-League club Chennai City as a replacement for Uzbek recruit Aman Talantbekov.

"My AFC Champions League stint has made me want to experience football outside of South Korea. It will be interesting for me to play alongside new teammates and pit my skills against the foreign players of other clubs. Chennai City FC deserves to be in a higher position and I am here to help the club achieve that”

— Kim on joining Chennai City

He made his debut in a 0–0 draw against Mohun Bagan.

With Chennai City, He also appeared in the Hero Super Cup in 2018 and the continental tournament 2018 AFC Cup.

=== Siheung Citizen ===
In 2018, he returned to Korea and signed with K4 League outfit Siheung Citizen FC, with which he appeared in 12 league matches and emerged as the champions of the 2018 K3 League Basic.

== Honours ==
Siheung Citizen

- K3 League Basic: 2018
