= Daniel Odafin =

Nigerian footballer

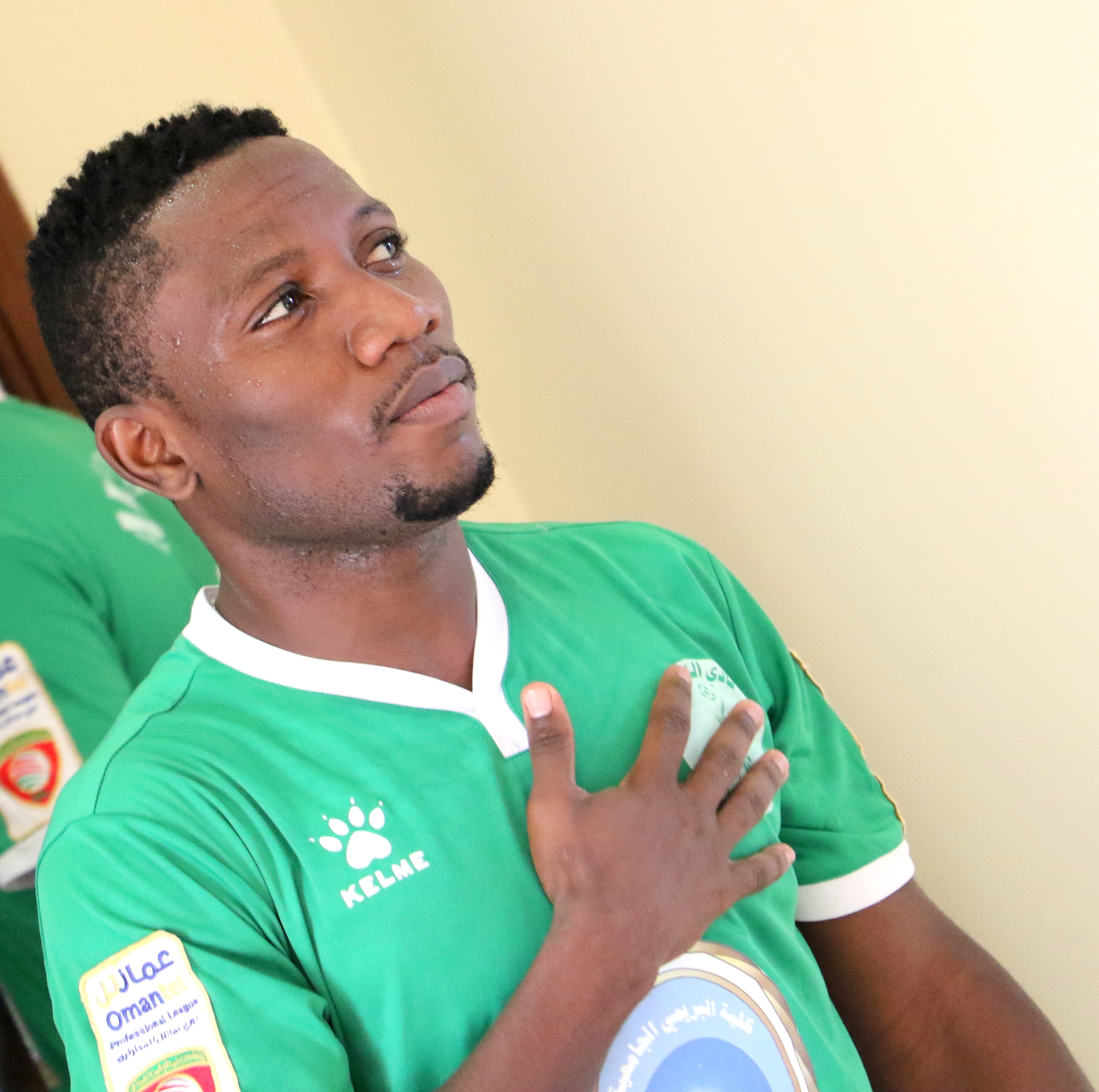
- Daniel Odafin, Nigerian footballer

Personal information
- Date of birth: 5 January 1989 (age 37)
- Place of birth: Lagos, Nigeria
- Height: 1.79 m (5 ft 10 in)
- Position: Defensive midfielder

Senior career*
Years	Team	Apps	(Gls)
2007–2008	Al-Hala	15	(1)
2008–2009	Tishreen	18	(0)
2009–2010	Al-Jazeera	20	(1)
2010–2011	Hutteen	12	(0)
2011–2014	Shabab Al-Sahel	60	(2)
2014	Al-Zawra'a	6	(0)
2015	Al-Nahda	14	(0)
2015–2016	Shabab Al-Sahel	18	(1)
2016–2017	Al-Nabi Sheet	14	(0)
2017–2018	Shillong Lajong	17	(1)
2019	Lefke Türk	1	(0)
- * Club domestic league appearances and goals as of 15:54, 24 February 2020 (UTC)

Daniel Odafin (born 5 January 1989) is a Nigerian professional footballer, who last played for Lefke Türk.

== Club career ==
=== Bahrain ===
In 2007, he began his professional footballing career in the Middle East and more accurately Bahrain where he signed a one-year contract with Bahraini Premier League club, Al-Hala SC. He scored 1 goal in 15 appearances for the Halat Bu Maher-based club in the 2007–08 Bahraini Premier League.

=== Syria ===
In 2008, he moved to Western Asia and more accurately to Syria where he signed a one-year contract with Tishreen SC. He made 18 appearances for the Latakia-based club in the 2008–09 Syrian Premier League.

In 2009, he moved to Al-Hasakah where he signed a one-year contract with another Syrian Premier League club, Al-Jazeera SC Hasakah. He scored 1 goal in 20 appearances in the 2009–10 Syrian Premier League.

He moved back to Latakia in 2010 and signed a one-year contract with Hutteen SC. He made 12 appearances in the 2010–11 Syrian Premier League.

=== Lebanon ===
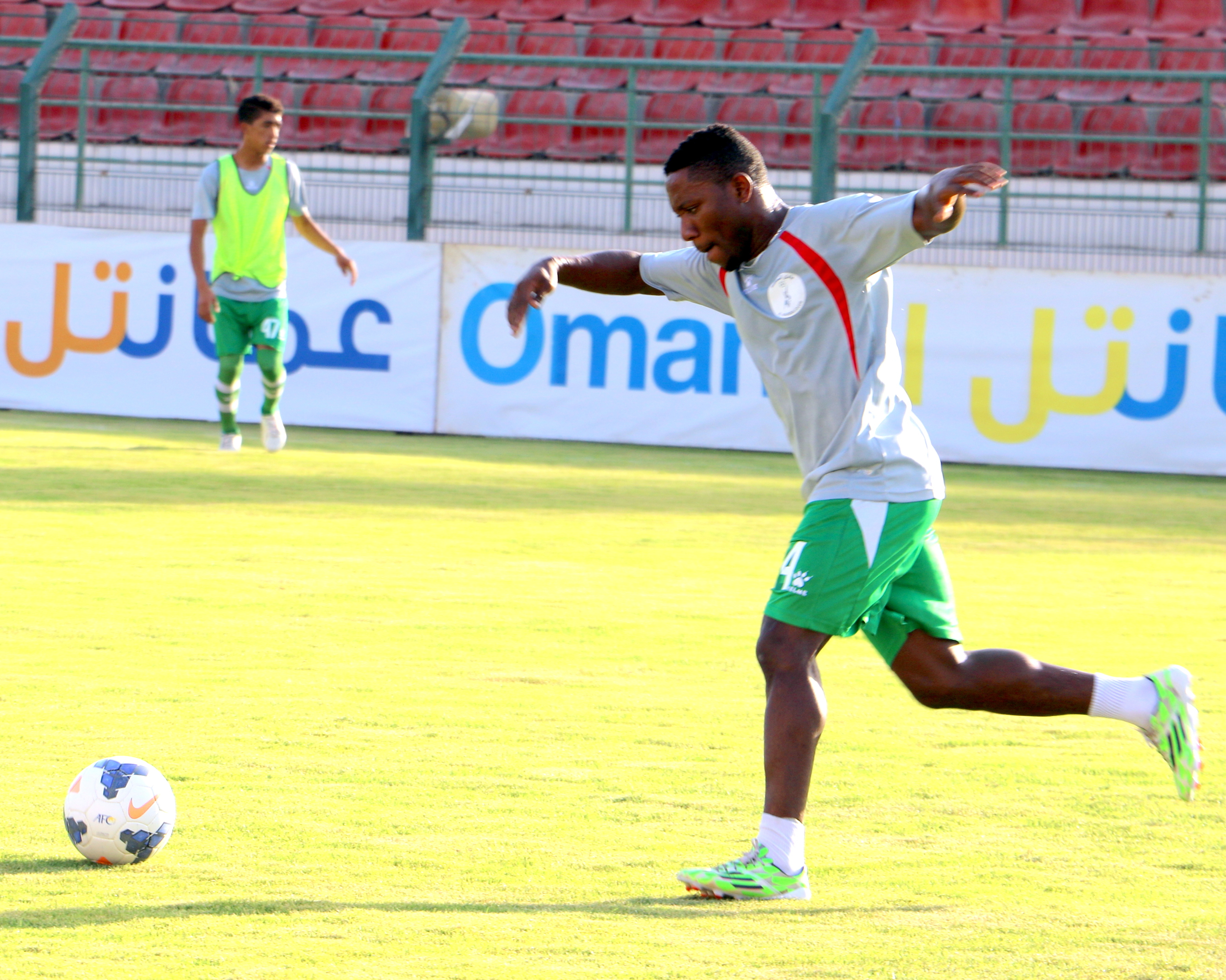
Daniel Odafin - Al-Nahda Club

In 2011, he moved to Lebanon, where he signed a long-term contract with Shabab Al-Sahel. He made his Lebanese Premier League debut on 23 October 2011 in a 2–0 win over Salam Sour and scored his first and only goal of the season on 4 May 2012 in a 3–2 win over Al-Ansar SC. He scored 1 goal in 19 appearances in the 2011–12 Lebanese Premier League. He made his first appearance in the 2012–13 Lebanese Premier League on 30 September 2012 in a 1–0 win over Racing Beirut and scored his first and only goal of the season on 18 November 2012 in a 2–1 loss against Al-Ahed. He scored 1 goal in 21 appearances in the 2012–13 season. He also made an appearance in the 2012–13 Lebanese FA Cup and scored 1 goal helping his club achieve the runners-up position. He made another appearance in the 2013 Lebanese Super Cup where his club lost 1–0 against Al-Safa' SC. He made his first appearance in the 2013–14 Lebanese Premier League on 21 September 2013 in a 2–1 loss against Al-Ahed. He made 20 appearances in the 2013–14 Lebanese Premier League. He was also voted as the 2013–14 season's best midfielder in the country.

=== Iraq ===
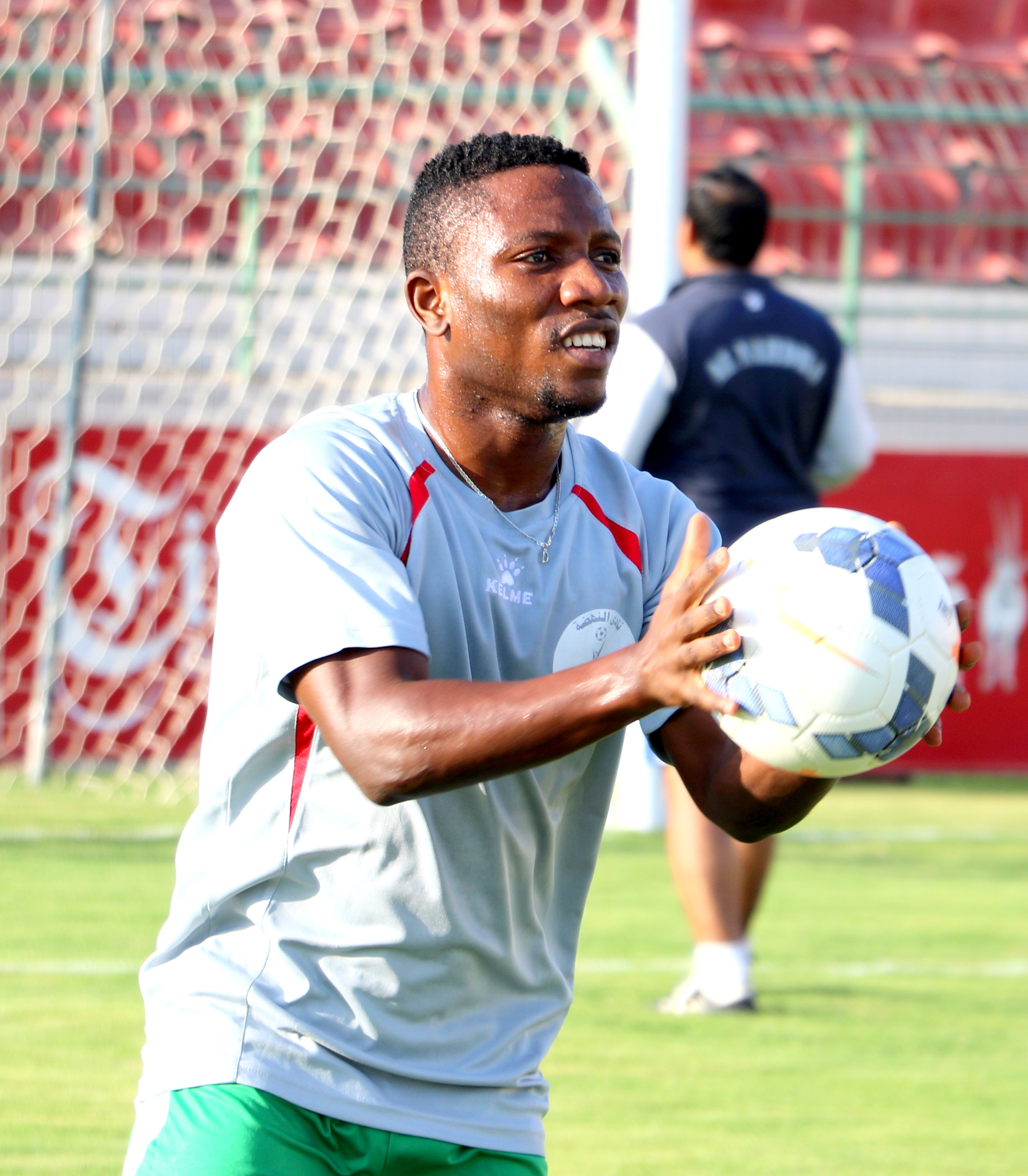
Daniel Odafin - Al-Nahda Club

In 2014, he moved to Iraq, where he signed a short-term contract with Iraqi Premier League club, Al-Zawra'a SC. He made 6 appearances for the Karkh-based club in the 2014–15 Iraqi Premier League.

=== Oman ===
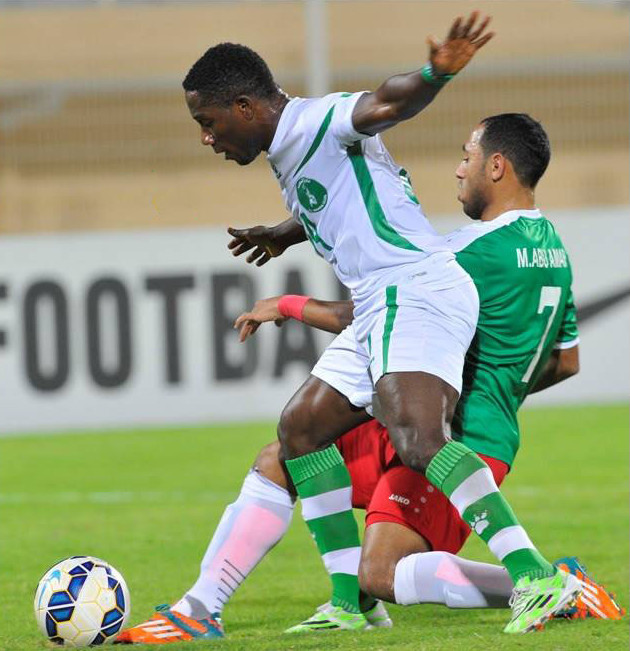
Daniel Odafin - 2015 AFC Cup

On 26 January 2015, he signed a six-month contract with 2013–14 Oman Professional League winners, Al-Nahda Club. He made his Oman Professional League debut on 4 February 2014 in a 3–1 loss against Al-Shabab, a match in which he was sent off at the 70th minute of the game. He also made an appearance in the 2015 AFC Champions League qualifying play-off match on 10 February 2015 in a 2–1 loss against Qatari side, El Jaish SC. He also made an appearance in a 2–1 loss against 2013–14 Qatar Stars League runners-up, El Jaish SC in the preliminary round 2 of 2015 AFC Champions League qualifying play-off and hence failed to advance to the 2015 AFC Champions League group stage. He made his AFC Cup debut on 24 February 2015 in a 2–1 win over 2013–14 Syrian Premier League winners, Al-Wahda SC Damascus. He finished with 6 appearances in the 2015 AFC Cup.

=== Back to Lebanon ===
In September 2014, he moved back to Lebanon, and more accurately to Beirut, where he signed a one-year contract with his former club, Shabab Al-Sahel. He made his first appearance in the 2015–16 Lebanese Premier League on 18 October 2015 in a 1–1 draw against Nejmeh SC and scored his only goal of the season on 7 November 2015 in a 2–1 win over Salam Zgharta. He finished with 1 goal in 18 appearances in the 2015-16 season.

Later in 2016, he moved to Al-Nabi Sheet where he signed a one-year contract with another Lebanese Premier League side, Al-Nabi Shayth. He made his debut for the club on 11 September 2016 in a 2–1 loss against Tadamon Sour.

=== India ===
In September 2017, the Nigerian moved to India where he signed a one-year contract with I-League side, Shillong Lajong F.C.

=== Club career statistics ===
Club	Season	Division	League		Cup		Continental (Note: Includes appearances in the AFC Champions League and AFC Cup)		Other		Total	
Club	Season	Division	Apps	Goals	Apps	Goals	Apps	Goals	Apps	Goals	Apps	Goals
Al-Hala	2007–08	Bahraini Premier League	15	1	0	0	0	0	0	0	15	1
Al-Hala	Total		15	1	0	0	0	0	0	0	15	1
Tishreen	2008-09	Syrian Premier League	18	0	0	0	0	0	0	0	18	0
Tishreen	Total		18	0	0	0	0	0	0	0	18	0
Al-Jazeera	2009-10	Syrian Premier League	20	1	0	0	0	0	0	0	20	1
Al-Jazeera	Total		20	1	0	0	0	0	0	0	20	1
Hutteen	2010-11	Syrian Premier League	12	0	0	0	0	0	0	0	12	0
Hutteen	Total		12	0	0	0	0	0	0	0	12	0
Shabab Al-Sahel	2011-12	Lebanese Premier League	19	1	0	0	0	0	0	0	19	1
Shabab Al-Sahel	2012–13	Lebanese Premier League	21	1	0	0	0	0	0	0	21	1
Shabab Al-Sahel	2013–14	Lebanese Premier League	20	0	0	0	0	0	0	0	20	0
Shabab Al-Sahel	Total		60	2	2	1	0	0	0	0	62	3
Al-Zawra'a	2014–15	Iraqi Premier League	6	0	0	0	0	0	0	0	6	0
Al-Zawra'a	Total		6	0	0	0	0	0	0	0	6	0
Al-Nahda	2014–15	Oman Professional League	14	0	0	0	7	0	0	0	21	0
Al-Nahda	Total		14	0	0	0	7	0	0	0	21	0
Shabab Al-Sahel	2015-16	Lebanese Premier League	18	1	0	0	0	0	0	0	18	1
Shabab Al-Sahel	Total		18	1	0	0	0	0	0	0	18	0
Al-Nabi Sheet	2016-17	Lebanese Premier League	14	0	0	0	0	0	0	0	14	0
Al-Nabi Sheet	Total		14	0	0	0	0	0	0	0	14	0
Shillong Lajong	2017–18	I-League	14	1	0	0	0	0	0	0	14	1
Shillong Lajong	Total		14	1	0	0	0	0	0	0	14	1
Career total			191	6	2	1	7	0	0	0	200	7

== Honours ==
=== Club ===
- With Shabab Al-Sahel
  - Lebanese FA Cup (0): Runner-up 2012-13
  - Lebanese Super Cup (0): Runner-up 2013

=== Individual ===
- Lebanese Premier League Best Defensive Midfielder: 2013-14
