= Kingsley Obumneme =

Nigerian footballer (born 1991)

Personal information
- Full name: Eze Kingsley Obumneme
- Date of birth: 22 November 1991 (age 34)
- Place of birth: Enugu State, Nigeria
- Height: 1.85 m (6 ft 1 in)
- Position: Centre-back

Team information
- Current team: Al-Suwaiq
- Number: 4

Youth career
- 2009–2011: Enugu Rangers

Senior career*
Years	Team	Apps	(Gls)
2015–2016	United	25	(4)
2016–2017	Peerless	9	(3)
2016–2017	Aizawl	17	(0)
2017–2019	Mohun Bagan	46	(7)
2019–2020	Minerva Punjab	6	(0)
2020–2021	Mohammedan	14	(0)
2022–	Al-Suwaiq	0	(0)
- * Club domestic league appearances and goals as of 10 March 2021

Eze Kingsley Obumneme (born 22 November 1991) is a Nigerian professional footballer who plays as a defender for Al-Suwaiq in the Oman Professional League.

== Career ==
=== India ===
Kingsley Obumneme has spent the majority of his career playing in the I-League in India. He has played for clubs such as United, in I-league 2nd division and Peerless in the Calcutta Football League.

=== Aizawl ===
On 24 December 2016, Obumneme signed with professional I-League side Aizawl. He made his debut for the club on 7 January 2017 against East Bengal. He started the match and played the full ninety minutes as Aizawl drew 1–1.

=== Mohun Bagan A.C ===
In 2017, he signed a one-year contract with Mohun Bagan, and appeared in both the I-League and CFL Premier Division matches.

== Career statistics ==
=== Club ===
As of 10 March 2021

Club	Season	League			Cup		Continental		Total	
Club	Season	Division	Apps	Goals	Apps	Goals	Apps	Goals	Apps	Goals
Aizawl	2016–17	I-League	17	0	3 (Note: Appearance(s) in Federation Cup)	0	—		20	0
Mohun Bagan	2017–18	I-League	17	2	3 (Note: Appearance(s) in Super Cup)	0	—		20	2
Mohun Bagan	2018–19	I-League	19	0	0	0	—		19	0
Mohun Bagan	Mohun Bagan total		36	2	3	0	0	0	39	2
Minerva Punjab	2019–20	I-League	6	0	0	0	—		6	0
Mohammedan	2020	I-League 2nd Division	3	0	0	0	—		3	0
Mohammedan	2020–21	I-League	11	0	0	0	—		11	0
Mohammedan	Mohammedan total		14	0	0	0	0	0	14	0
Al-Suwaiq	2021–22	Oman Professional League	0	0	0	0	—		0	0
Career total			73	2	6	0	0	0	79	2

== Honours and titles ==
=== Club ===
Aizawl FC

- I-League(1): 2016–17

Mohun Bagan

- Calcutta Football League (1): 2018–19

Mohammedan SC

- I-League 2nd Division(1): 2019–20
