= Aser Pierrick Dipanda =

Cameroonian footballer

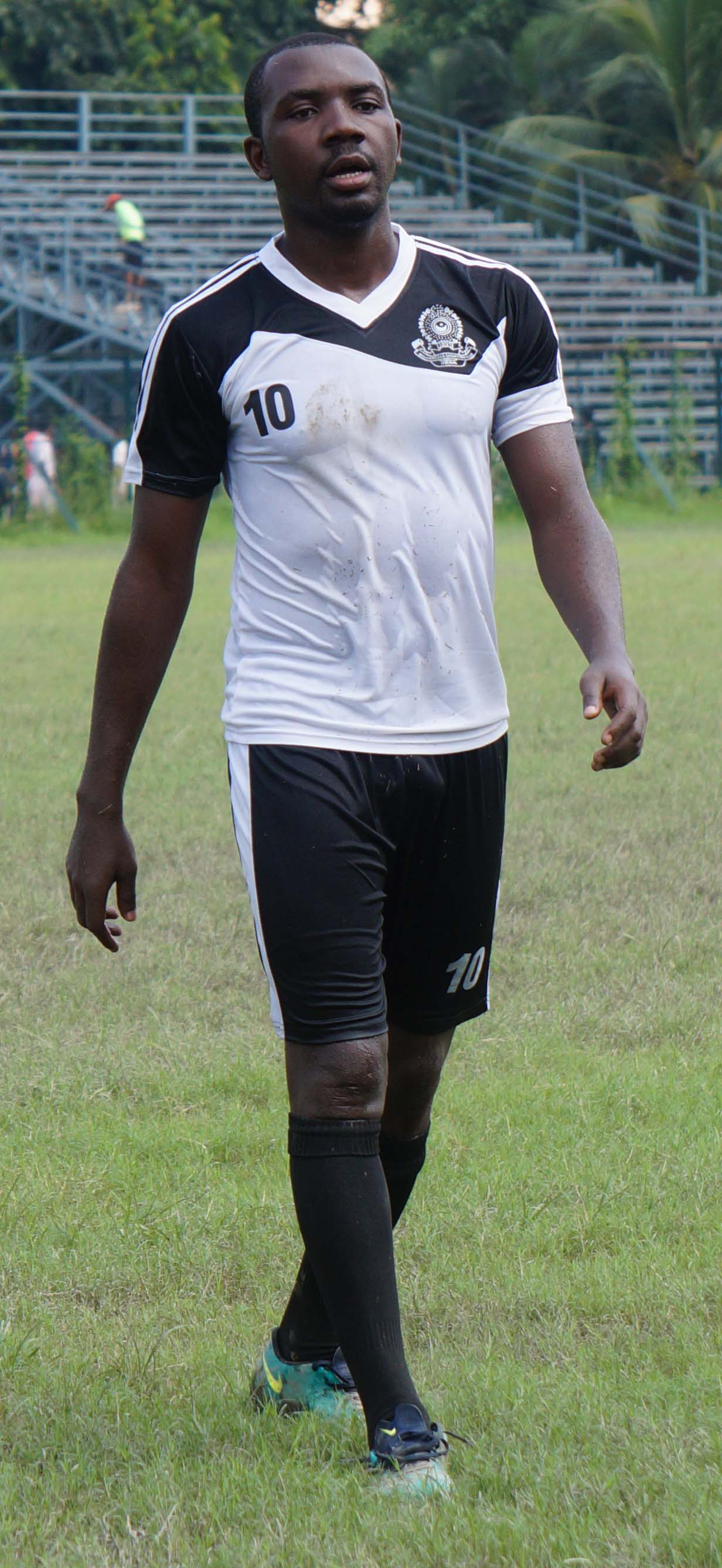
- Dipanda with Mohammedan in 2017

Personal information
- Full name: Aser Pierrick Dipanda Dicka
- Date of birth: 18 February 1989 (age 37)
- Place of birth: Douala, Cameroon
- Height: 1.82 m (6 ft 0 in)
- Position: Forward

Youth career
- Valencia

Senior career*
Years	Team	Apps	(Gls)
2006–2011	Valencia B	25	(5)
2008–2009	→ Burjassot (loan)	24	(9)
2009–2010	→ La Roda (loan)	33	(11)
2010	→ Olímpic Xátiva (loan)	13	(0)
2011	→ Gandía (loan)		
2011–2012	La Roda	33	(2)
2012–2013	Alzira	37	(8)
2013–2015	Paiporta	11	(8)
2015–2016	DSK Shivajians	13	(7)
2016–2017	Shillong Lajong	17	(11)
2017	Mohammedan	9	(12)
2017–2018	→ Mohun Bagan (loan)	18	(13)
2018–2019	Mohun Bagan	20	(8)
2019–2020	Minerva Punjab	16	(12)
2020–2021	Real Kashmir	10	(4)
2021	Delhi	7	(10)
2021–2022	Aizawl	13	(4)
2022–2023	Delhi		
- * Club domestic league appearances and goals

Aser Pierrick Dipanda Dicka (born 18 February 1989) is a Cameroonian professional footballer who plays as a forward.

== Career ==
Born in Douala, Dipanda has spent the majority of his career playing in Spain with Valencia B, La Roda, Olímpic de Xàtiva, and Alzira. Dipanda then moved to India where he joined DSK Shivajians of the I-League. He made his debut for the club on 17 January 2016 against Sporting Goa. He then appeared with Calcutta-giants Mohun Bagan. In September 2019, he was signed up by Minerva Punjab to play in the I-League.

In 2021, he joined newly formed Delhi FC and appeared in the 130th edition of Durand Cup. He later appeared in the 2021 I-League Qualifiers, in which they finished on third position.

== Career statistics ==
=== Club ===
As of 4 May 2022

Appearances and goals by club, season and competition
Club	Season	League			Cup		Continental		Total	
Club	Season	Division	Apps	Goals	Apps	Goals	Apps	Goals	Apps	Goals
DSK Shivajians	2015–16	I-League	13	7	0	0	—		13	7
Shillong Lajong	2016–17	I-League	17	11	1 (Note: Appearance(s) in Super Cup)	0	—		18	11
Mohammedan	2017–18	Calcutta Football League	9	12	0	0	—		9	12
Mohun Bagan (loan)	2017–18	I-League	18	13	3	4	—		21	17
Mohun Bagan	2018–19	I-League	20	8	0	0	—		20	8
Minerva Punjab	2019–20	I-League	16	12	0	0	—		16	12
Real Kashmir	2020–21	I-League	10	4	0	0	—		10	4
Delhi	2021–22	FD Senior Division League	7	10	0	0	—		7	10
Aizawl	2021–22	I-League	13	4	0	0	—		13	4
Career total			123	81	4	4	0	0	127	85

== Honours ==
Individual

- Best Striker of Hero I-League: 2016–17
- Best Striker of Hero I-League: 2017–18
- 2021 FD Senior Division Golden Boot (10 goals)

Mohun Bagan

- Calcutta Football League: 2018–19

DSK Shivajians

- DSK Invitational Cup: 2015

Minerva Punjab

- Punjab State Super League: 2019
