= William Opoku =

Ghanaian footballer (born 1997)

Personal information
- Full name: William Opoku Asiedu
- Date of birth: 1 April 1997 (age 29)
- Place of birth: Accra, Ghana
- Height: 1.71 m (5 ft 7 1/2 in)
- Position: Midfielder

Senior career*
Years	Team	Apps	(Gls)
2016	Okyeman Planners		
2016–2017	Middlesbrough	0	(0)
2017	→ Levadia Tallinn (loan)	1	(0)
2017	→ Levadia Tallinn U21 (loan)	15	(7)
2017–2019	Minerva Punjab	29	(7)
2019	Ozone	8	(1)
2019	BSS Sporting Club	4	(5)
2020	Bhawanipore	5	(0)
2020–2021	Bengaluru United	4	(1)
2021	Butwal Lumbini		
2023	Bodoland FC		
2024	Al-Qous		
2024	Paro FC		
2025	Red Panda FC		

International career
2016	Ghana U20		
- * Club domestic league appearances and goals

William Opoku Asiedu (born 1 April 1997) is a Ghanaian professional footballer who last played as a midfielder for Thimphu FC.

== Club career ==
Opoku's career began in Ghana with Division One club Okyeman Planners. He scored eleven goals in his final season, 2016, with Okyeman. In February 2017, Opoku joined Premier League team Middlesbrough on a long-term contract. He was immediately loaned out to Levadia Tallinn of the Meistriliiga for eighteen months. He made his Levadia debut on 3 March in the league versus Flora. During his time in Estonia, Opoku mainly featured for their reserve team in the Esiliiga. In total, he scored seven goals in fifteen games in the tier two. His loan with Levadia was terminated in June 2017.

On 26 September, Opoku joined I-League side Minerva Punjab. He made a goalscoring debut for Minerva in a 2017 Punjab State Football League match against Dalbir FA. In I-League action, Opoku scored three goals in his first four appearances. On 8 March 2018, Opoku scored the winning goal in a 1–0 win over Churchill Brothers which secured the 2017–18 I-League title. He extended his contract for one more year in September 2018. However, in 2019, Opoku moved to Ozone of the I-League 2nd Division. Months after, he headed to Calcutta Football League team BSS Sporting Club.

2020 saw Opoku move across Kolkata to Bhawanipore. In September of the same year, Opoku headed back to the I-League 2nd Division with Bengaluru United.

== International career ==
Opoku has represented Ghana at U20 level, featuring during the 2017 Africa U-20 Cup of Nations qualifying campaign.

== Career statistics ==
As of 5 September 2020

Club statistics
Club	Season	League			Cup		League Cup		Continental		Other		Total	
Club	Season	Division	Apps	Goals	Apps	Goals	Apps	Goals	Apps	Goals	Apps	Goals	Apps	Goals
Minerva Punjab	2017–18	I-League	18	5	0	0	0	0	—		0	0	18	5
Minerva Punjab	2018–19	I-League	11	2	0	0	0	0	—		0	0	11	2
Career total			29	7	0	0	0	0	—		0	0	29	7

== Honours ==
Minerva Punjab

- I-League: 2017–18

Paro FC

- Bhutan Premier League: 2024
