= Felix Chidi Odili =

Nigerian footballer (born 1990)

Personal information
- Date of birth: 27 October 1990 (age 36)
- Place of birth: Warri, Nigeria
- Height: 1.77 m (5 ft 10 in)
- Position: Striker

Senior career*
| Years | Team | Apps | (Gls) |
| 2012 | Vasco | | |
| 2013 | Josco | 8 | (2) |
| 2014 | Eagles | 4 | (2) |
| 2014–15 | Calangute Association | | |
| 2016 | Dempo | 10 | (5) |
| 2017–2019 | NEROCA | 53 | (24) |
| 2019–2020 | Rainbow AC | | |
| 2020–2021 | Kelantan | 11 | (4) |
| 2021 | Rahmatganj MFS | 12 | (6) |
| 2022 | Sudeva Delhi | 6 | (0) |
- * Club domestic league appearances and goals as of 18:02, 10 December 2022 (UTC)

Felix Chidi Odili (born 27 October 1990) is a Nigerian footballer who plays as forward.

== Club career ==
=== Vasco ===
Felix Chidi started his career in India by playing for Vasco in Goa Professional League in 2012. It was not an ideal start, as Vasco got relegated.

=== Josco ===
In 2013 he signed for I-League 2nd Division side Josco. He scored his first goal for the club in a 1–2 loss against Simla Youngs. He added another goal against his name in the club's 0–1 victory over PIFA.

=== Eagles ===
He signed for I-League 2nd Division club Eagles FC from Kerala in 2014 where he scored 2 goals in 4 matches.

=== Calangute Association ===
In 2014 after the end of I-League 2nd Division he signed for Goa Professional League club Calangute Association. He stayed there for two seasons. He scored 4 goals in first season with the club. His second season with them was successful; he scored 9 goals in 2015–16 Goa Professional League finishing second in top scorer list.

=== Dempo ===
In January 2016 Felix joined newly relegated side Dempo in I-League 2nd Division as replacement of injured Josimar Martins. He finished as joint top scorer with 7 goals in 2015–16 I-League 2nd Division which helped Dempo to get promotion to I-League. Following that he played GPL for Dempo and was the second highest scorer with 8 goals.

=== NEROCA ===
After Dempo withdrew from 2016–17 I-League, he signed for I-League 2nd Division club NEROCA. NEROCA won the 2015–16 I-League 2nd Division and once again Felix finished the season as joint high scorer of the league with 9 goals. Following the promotion to the I-League the club renewed his contract for another season.

=== Kelantan ===
In January 2020, Felix joined Malaysia club Kelantan FA for one season.

=== Sudeva Delhi ===
In 2022, he signed with I-League club Sudeva Delhi.

== Career statistics ==
=== Club ===
As of 10 December 2022

| Club | Season | League | | | Cup | | Continental | | Total | |
| Club | Season | Division | Apps | Goals | Apps | Goals | Apps | Goals | Apps | Goals |
|---|---|---|---|---|---|---|---|---|---|---|
| Dempo | 2015–16 | I-League 2nd Division | 10 | 5 | 0 | 0 | — | | 10 | 5 |
| NEROCA | 2016–17 | I-League 2nd Division | 15 | 9 | 0 | 0 | — | | 15 | 9 |
| NEROCA | 2017–18 | I-League | 18 | 7 | 2 (Note: Appearance(s) in Super Cup) | 1 | — | | 20 | 8 |
| NEROCA | 2017–18 | I-League | 20 | 8 | 0 | 0 | — | | 20 | 8 |
| NEROCA | NEROCA total | | 53 | 24 | 2 | 1 | 0 | 0 | 55 | 25 |
| Rahmatganj MFS | 2020–21 | Bangladesh Premier League | 12 | 6 | 0 | 0 | — | | 12 | 6 |
| Sudeva Delhi | 2022–23 | I-League | 6 | 0 | 0 | 0 | — | | 6 | 0 |
| Career total | | | 81 | 35 | 2 | 1 | 0 | 0 | 83 | 36 |

== Honours ==
Dempo

- I-League 2nd div: 2015–16

NEROCA

- I-League 2nd div: 2016–17

Individual

- I-League 2nd div top scorer: 2015–16, 2016–17
