= Bali Gagandeep =

Indian footballer (born 1990)

Personal information
- Date of birth: 2 June 1990 (age 36)
- Place of birth: Punjab, India
- Height: 1.76 m (5 ft 9 1/2 in)
- Position: Forward

Team information
- Current team: United Kolkata
- Number: 97

Senior career*
Years	Team	Apps	(Gls)
2013–2016	Salgaocar	2	(0)
2017–2018	Minerva Punjab	14	(3)
2018–2019	East Bengal	13	(0)
2019–2021	Minerva Punjab	12	(0)
2021–2026	Delhi		
- * Club domestic league appearances and goals

Bali Gagandeep (born 2 June 1990) is an Indian professional footballer who plays as a forward for United Kolkata.

== Career ==
Gagandeep made his debut for Salgaocar on 18 October 2013 against Mumabi at Balewadi Sports Complex in which he started and played 51 minutes as Salgaocar won the match 3–1.

In May 2018, he joined East Bengal FC. He was red carded in his first I-League match for the red and golds against Churchill Brothers.

== Career statistics ==
As of 20 October 2013

Club	Season	League			Federation Cup		Durand Cup		AFC		Total	
Club	Season	Division	Apps	Goals	Apps	Goals	Apps	Goals	Apps	Goals	Apps	Goals
Salgaocar	2013–14	I-League	2	0	0	0	—	—	—	—	2	0
Career total			2	0	0	0	0	0	0	0	2	0
