= Léonce Dodoz =

Ivorian footballer (born 1992)

Personal information
- Full name: Zikahi Léonce Dodoz
- Date of birth: 28 June 1992 (age 34)
- Place of birth: Abidjan, Ivory Coast
- Position: Forward

Senior career*
Years	Team	Apps	(Gls)
2012	JC Abidjan		
2012	Friends		
2013	Three Star		
2014–2015	Manang Marshyangdi		
2015–2016	Gangtok Himalayan	9	(4)
2016–2017	Mohammedan	16	(5)
2016	→ Chanmari (loan)	5	(0)
2017–2019	Aizawl	36	(7)
2019–2020	Bhawanipore		
2020	Free State Stars	5	(0)
2021–2022	BSS Sporting Club		
2022	SC Gagnoa		
2022–2023	ES Bafing		
2023	Rajasthan United	4	(0)
2023	Sikkim Aakraman FC		
2023	Namlha FC		
- * Club domestic league appearances and goals

Zikahi Léonce Dodoz (born 28 June 1992) is an Ivorian professional footballer who plays as a forward. He is of Beninese descent.

== Club career ==
=== Nepal ===
Claiming he was beguiled by a football agent into entering Nepal, Dodoz plied his trade with Friends Club for a year before moving to Three Star Club for 2013. The Ivorian left the team in December that year without contacting their board, with fans asking to get a replacement for him for 2014.

While lining up for Three Star Club in 2013, Dodoz's mother died.

He missed the 2014 Nepal Martyr's Memorial A-Division Super Six due to a cracked ankle.

=== India ===
Besides Nepal, Dodoz has appeared for various Indian sides in different leagues. In 2015, he signed for Gangtok Himalayan S.C. before moving to Kolkata giants Mohammedan Sporting. With Gangtok, he played in the Sikkim Premier Division League and scored 4 goals in 9 matches.

In Mohammedan Sporting, Dodoz appeared in both Calcutta Football League and I-League 2nd Division matches.

He later signed for Mizoram Premier League side Chanmari FC in 2016. He made his I-League debut as a player of Aizawl FC in 2017 and continued playing for the club until 2019. He scored 11 league goals in 44 official matches.

Dodoz again choose a new club in India, Bhawanipore FC in 2019, that also competes in the Calcutta Football League. He stayed there for a season before moving to Free State Stars F.C. in South Africa. In January 2023, Dodoz moved back to India and joined I-League side Rajasthan United on a season-long deal.

== Honours ==
Three Star Club

- Nepal A- Division League: 2013

Manang Marshyangdi

- Nepal A- Division League: 2014

Mohammedan Sporting

- Calcutta Football League: 2016–17
