= C. R. Srikrishna =

Indian football referee (born 1977)

C.R. Srikrishna
- Full name: Coimbatore Ramaswamy Srikrishna
- Born: 1977 (age 48–49); Coimbatore, Tamil Nadu, India

Domestic
Years	League	Role
2008–present	I-League	Referee

International
Years	League	Role
2010–	FIFA listed	Referee

Coimbatore Ramaswamy Srikrishna (born 1977) is an Indian professional football referee who officiates primarily in the I-League. He is a referee from Coimbatore.

== Early life ==
Srikrishna was born in 1977 in Coimbatore, Tamil Nadu, India. At the age of 19 while playing for LG Sports Club, Srikrishna started taking up refereeing. He said that after practice he used to discuss the rules of the game with SDAT coach L.C. John. "I always knew I had an inclination towards refereeing," he said.

== Refereeing career ==
Srikrishna started refereeing the Chennai Super League which was the top league in Tamil Nadu. While refereeing in the league Srikrishna thanked K. Sankar, Pradeep Kumar and S. Suresh for helping him and teaching him. His biggest game while refereeing in the league was a match between ICF and Indian Bank during the State League final.

In 2008 Srikrishna started refereeing matches in the I-League and other All India Football Federation events. In 2010 Srikrishna joined the referee list of FIFA.

On 10 Jan 2012, he was the Fourth Official for Bhaichung Bhutia's farewell match between India, and Bayern Munich.

On 22 June 2012, it was announced that Srikrishna was named AIFF Referee of the Year for 2011–12. It was also announced that AIFF Referee Department leader, Gautam Kar, referred Srikrishna to the Asian Football Confederation Elite Panel of Referees. A decision should be made soon about that.

On 20 Dec 2015, it was announced that Sri krishna was named AIFF Referee of the Year for 2015–16.
