= Jawaharlal Nehru Stadium (Coimbatore) =

Multi-purpose stadium in Coimbatore, Tamil Nadu

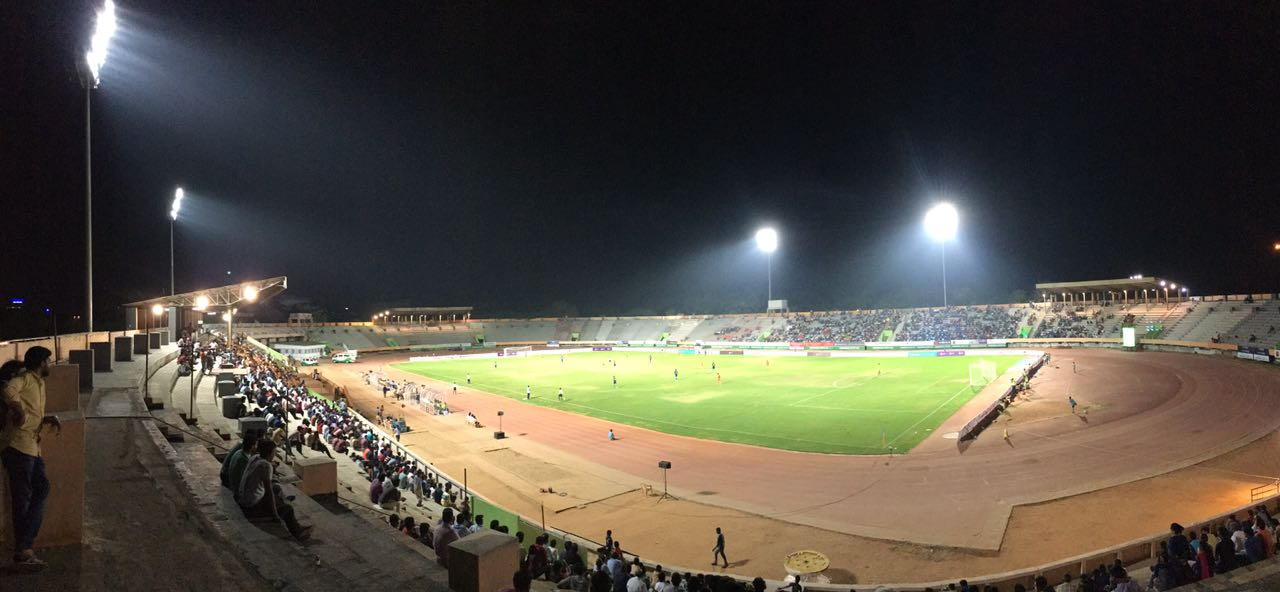
- The stadium on a matchday of I-League in 2018
- Interactive map of Jawaharlal Nehru Stadium (Coimbatore)
- Full name: Jawaharlal Nehru Stadium
- Location: Coimbatore, Tamil Nadu, India
- Coordinates: 11.006626°N 76.969475°E
- Owner: Coimbatore Municipal Corporation
- Operator: Coimbatore Municipal Corporation
- Capacity: 30,000
- Surface: Synthetic track

Construction
- Opened: 1971
- Renovated: 2008, 2017
- Structural engineer: M. Abdul Jabbar

Tenant
- Chennai City (till 2022)

Jawaharlal Nehru Stadium is a multi-purpose stadium located in Coimbatore, Tamil Nadu, India. Constructed in 1971, It is currently used mostly for football matches. The stadium has a capacity of 30,000 spectators. The stadium was used as the home ground of I-League club Chennai City FC for its I-League seasons. It is named after the first Prime Minister of India, Jawaharlal Nehru.

== Location ==
Located in the heart of Coimbatore, near V.O.Chidambaram Park, Nehru Stadium is a popular venue for football tournaments, cricket matches, and athletic meets. Famous matches here are Santosh Trophy in 1978 and 1992, the Federation Cup in 1979 and 1991. International competitions include a visit by the Russian team to play matches against India in 1978.

== Facilities ==
The stadium is equipped with floodlights for conducting day and night matches. It has also a 400 m athletic track with football/hockey field.

Provisions were also made for dressing rooms, conference hall, cloakrooms, bath facilities for players and athletes, a mini-hospital and many more. A tunnel was even planned from the main entrance to take the athletes to the stadium without disturbing the track events. Also, for the construction of indoor games hall, swimming pool, ticket booths, electronic scoreboard, canteen room, public telephone booth and press and telex-printer service rooms. But nothing came up because only commercial establishments made the best use of the stadium's outer ring.

When constructed in 1971, it was to reach a capacity of 45,000 people with 30,000 on the lower tier and further 15,000 on the second, mounted above. Unfortunately, the plan was never carried out completely, leaving the venue with single-tiered spectator terraces.

The only reminder of the plans is concrete blocks sticking out from the terracing throughout the perimeter of the ground. In three parts of the stadium – main stand and two curves – they were indeed used, but only to provide a roof over of spectators.

== Renovation ==
No seats were installed despite Nehru Stadium having a significant renovation in 2008. The ground is open for everyone and providing high-quality training facilities was given priority over event infrastructure.

The stadium was again renovated in 2017 by Chennai City FC, with grass turf and installed seats on main stands when they have chosen it as a home stadium. In 2017–18, Chennai City Football Club renovated the Nehru Stadium, Coimbatore with new Pitch and also built new dressing rooms, broadcasting rooms, match official rooms, dope control rooms and medical rooms with necessary shower facilities and repaired all toilets and gates of the stadium.

Chennai City Football Club adopted the Nehru Stadium, Coimbatore. Most importantly Chennai City Football Club has given a new playable football stadium with all amenities to Tamil Nadu and India to host national level matches. Chennai City has spent about Rs 3 crore in improving the infrastructure at Coimbatore, and they have re-laid the pitch with Bermuda grass that will vastly improve the playing surface.

== See also ==
- List of football stadiums in India
- Sports in Tamil Nadu
