= Jean-Michel Joachim =

French footballer (born 1992)

Personal information
- Full name: Jean-Michel Joachim
- Date of birth: 3 May 1992 (age 34)
- Place of birth: Les Ulis, France
- Height: 1.79 m (5 ft 10 in)
- Position: Forward

Team information
- Current team: FC Mitrovica

Senior career*
Years	Team	Apps	(Gls)
2010–2015	Nancy B	64	(27)
2010–2015	Nancy	2	(0)
2012–2013	→ Boulogne B (loan)	2	(3)
2012–2013	→ Boulogne (loan)	6	(2)
2015–2016	Wiltz	10	(3)
2017	Carlisle United	2	(0)
2017	Kidderminister Harriers	2	(0)
2017–2018	Chennai City	17	(5)
2018	NEROCA	1	(1)
2018–2019	Anagennisi Deryneia	12	(5)
2019	Al Sahel	19	(7)
2019–2020	CO Les Ulis	7	(0)
2020–2022	Busaiteen Club	7	(1)
2022–2023	Club Rachad Bernoussi		
2023–2025	Pretoria Callies		
2025–	Mitrovica		
- * Club domestic league appearances and goals as of 22:35, 15 April 2020 (UTC)

Jean-Michel Joachim (born 3 May 1992) is a French footballer who plays for Kosovo club FC Mitrovica as a forward.

== Career ==
Joachim kicked off his career with French club Nancy with whom he made two appearances in Ligue 1 as a substitute in 2013. After a stint with Wiltz 71, he trialled with English EFL League Two Carlisle United in 2017. After a successful trial, he signed a professional contract in March which would keep him in the club till the end of the season. He made his debut in a match against Mansfield Town.

After spending the entire 2017 preseason with National League club Kidderminster Harriers, Joachim signed a professional contract with the non-league club in the summer. In September, he switched clubs and countries, this time by penning a deal with Indian I-League club Chennai City.

13 February 2020, Jean-Michel Joachim engaged with the bahreini professional football team Busaiteen Club.

On 1 September 2022, after 2 years in Bahrain, he decided to engage in Morocco in the Moroccan club of Club Rachad Bernoussi

On July 20th 2025, he signed a one-season contract with an optional one-season contract with the Kosovar club FC Mitrovica.
