= 2020–21 Jamshedpur FC season =

2020–21 season of Jamshedpur FC

Jamshedpur
2020–21 season
- CEO: Mukul Choudhari
- Head Coach: Owen Coyle
- Stadium: Tilak Maidan Stadium
- ISL: 6th
- Top goalscorer: League: Nerijus Valskis (8); All: Nerijus Valskis (8)
Home colours	Away colours	Third colours

The 2020–21 season was the fourth season of competitive football played by Jamshedpur.

== Background ==
In August 2020, Jamshedpur announced Owen Coyle as their new head coach, signing a two-year deal. Coyle retained David Grande and Aitor Monroy at the helm.

== First-team squad ==
As of 24 October 2020

Note: Flags indicate national team as defined under FIFA eligibility rules; some limited exceptions apply. Players may hold more than one non-FIFA nationality.

No.	Pos.	Nation	Player
1	GK	IND	Pawan Kumar
5	DF	IND	Narender Gahlot
6	MF	ESP	Aitor Monroy
7	MF	BRA	Alex Lima
8	MF	IND	Amarjit Singh Kiyam
9	FW	LTU	Nerijus Valskis
10	FW	ESP	David Grande
11	FW	IND	Aniket Jadhav
12	MF	IND	Jackichand Singh
13	MF	IND	Isaac Vanmalsawma
14	DF	IND	Joyner Lourenco
15	MF	IND	Mobashir Rahman
16	DF	IND	Ricky Lallawmawma
17	MF	IND	Bhupender Singh
19	DF	IND	Sandip Mandi
20	MF	IND	Billu Teli

No.	Pos.	Nation	Player
21	DF	IND	Subhash Barua
22	FW	AUS	Nick Fitzgerald
23	GK	IND	Niraj Kumar
24	MF	IND	Harsha Parui
25	GK	IND	Raj Mahato
26	DF	IND	Laldinliana Renthlei
27	DF	IND	Karan Amin
28	DF	IND	Manash Protim Gogoi
29	DF	ENG	Peter Hartley
31	GK	IND	Vishal Yadav
32	GK	IND	Rehenesh TP
33	DF	IND	Jitendra Singh
34	MF	IND	Manisana Singh
35	MF	IND	Gaurab
37	MF	IND	Gorachand Mardi
38	MF	IND	Sapam Kenedy Singh
49	FW	IND	William Lalnunfela
66	DF	NGA	Stephen Eze

== Pre-season and friendlies ==
1 November 2020 Friendly	Goa	3–2	Jamshedpur	Goa
16:00 IST (UTC+05:30)	Angulo; Doungel; Pandita		Grande; Mobashir	Stadium: Tilak Maidan Stadium; Attendance: 0

11 November 2020 Friendly	North East	0–0	Jamshedpur	Goa
16:00 IST (UTC+05:30)				Attendance: 0

14 November 2020 Friendly	Kerala Blasters	3–0	Jamshedpur	Goa, India
16:00 IST	Sahal; Hooper; Lourenco (o.g.)			Stadium: GMC Stadium, Bambolim; Attendance: 0

== Competitions ==
=== Overview ===
Competition	First match	Last match	Starting round	Final position	Record							
Competition	First match	Last match	Starting round	Final position	Pld	W	D	L	GF	GA	GD	Win %
ISL	November 2020	25 February 2021	Matchday 1	6th	20	7	6	7	21	22	−1	35.00
Super Cup									—			
Total					20	7	6	7	21	22	−1	35.00

Last updated: 25 February 2021
Source: Competitions

=== Indian Super League ===
==== League table ====
Pos	Team	Pld	W	D	L	GF	GA	GD	Pts	Qualification
4	Goa	20	7	10	3	31	23	+8	31	Qualification to ISL playoffs
5	Hyderabad	20	6	11	3	27	19	+8	29	
6	Jamshedpur	20	7	6	7	21	22	−1	27	
7	Bengaluru	20	5	7	8	26	28	−2	22	
8	Chennaiyin	20	3	11	6	17	23	−6	20	

Source: Indian Super League
Rules for classification: 1) points; 2) head-to-head points; 3) head-to-head goal difference; 4) head-to-head goals scored; 5) goal difference; 6) number of goals scored; 7) fair play ranking; 8) drawing of lots

==== Results summary ====
Overall								Home						Away					
Pld	W	D	L	GF	GA	GD	Pts	W	D	L	GF	GA	GD	W	D	L	GF	GA	GD
9	3	4	2	9	9	0	13	1	1	2	6	7	−1	2	3	0	3	2	+1

==== Results by matchday ====
Matchday	1	2	3	4	5	6	7	8	9	10	11	12	13	14	15	16	17	18	19	20
Ground	H	H	A	H	A	A	A	H	A	H	A	H	H	A	A	H	A	A	H	H
Result	L	D	D	W	D	D	W	L	W	L	L	L	D	D	W	L	W	L	W	W
Position	9	9	8	7	8	7	5	6	3											6

Updated to match(es) played on 25 February 2021. Source: Indian Super League
A = Away; H = Home; W = Win; D = Draw; L = Loss

==== Matches ====
24 November 2020 1	Jamshedpur	1–2	Chennaiyin	Vasco
19:30 IST	Valskis 37'	Report	Thapa 1'; Isma 26' (pen.); Crivellaro (yellow card) 43'; Kaith (yellow card) 69'; Tangri (yellow card) 70'	Stadium: Tilak Maidan Stadium; Attendance: 0 (Note: Match was played behind closed doors due to government restrictions regarding the COVID-19 pandemic in India.); Referee: Santosh Kumar; Man of the Match: Anirudh Thapa (Chennaiyin)

29 November 2020 2	Jamshedpur	2–2	Odisha	Vasco
17:00 IST	Valskis 12' (pen.), 27'; TP (red card) 60'	Report	Bora (yellow card) 11'; Alexander (yellow card) 49'; Maurício 77', 90'; Jacob Tratt (yellow card) 89'; Nanda Kumar (yellow card) 90'	Stadium: Tilak Maidan Stadium; Attendance: 0 Referee: Pratik Mondal; Man of the Match: Diego Maurício (Odisha)

2 December 2020 3	Hyderabad	1–1	Jamshedpur	Vasco
19:30 IST (UTC+05:30)	Santana 50'	Report	Eze (yellow card) 50' (goal) 85'; Jadhav (yellow card) 63'; Hartley (yellow card) 87'	Stadium: Tilak Maidan Stadium; Attendance: 0 Referee: Raktim Saha; Man of the Match: Yasir (Hyderabad)

7 December 2020 4	Jamshedpur	2–1	ATK Mohun Bagan	Vasco
19:30 IST	Lallawmawma (yellow card) 14'; Valskis 30', 66'; Alex (yellow card) 45'; Eze (yellow card) 69'; Renthlei (yellow card) 85'	Report	Krishna 80'	Stadium: Tilak Maidan Stadium; Attendance: 0 Referee: C. R. Srikrishna; Man of the Match: Valskis (Jamshedpur)

10 December 2020 5	East Bengal	0–0	Jamshedpur	Vasco
19:30 IST	Lyngdoh (yellow card) 21' (yellow-red card) 25'; Rafique (yellow card) 79'; Angousana (yellow card) 83'	Report	Jadhav (yellow card) 10'; Renthlei (yellow card) 58' (yellow-red card) 90'; Monroy (yellow card) 90'	Stadium: Tilak Maidan Stadium; Attendance: 0 Referee: Rahul Kumar Gupta; Man of the Match: Mohamed Irshad (East Bengal)

14 December 2020 6	Mumbai City	1–1	Jamshedpur	Bambolim
19:30 IST	Ogbeche 16'; Ranawade (yellow card) 87'	Report	Valskis 9'; Monroy (yellow card) 14' (yellow-red card) 28'	Stadium: GMC Athletic Stadium; Attendance: 0 Referee: C. R. Srikrishna; Man of the Match: Hartley (Jamshedpur)

18 December 2020 7	NorthEast United	0–1	Jamshedpur	Vasco
19:30 IST (UTC+05:30)	Camara (yellow card) 43'; Mehta (yellow card) 85'	Report	Jadhav 53'; Rahman (yellow card) 64'; Hartley (yellow card) 68'; Mandi (yellow card) 90'; Lallawmawma (yellow card) 90'	Stadium: Tilak Maidan Stadium; Referee: A Rowan; Man of the Match: Hartley (Jamshedpur)

23 December 2020 8	Jamshedpur	1–2	Goa	Vasco
19:30 IST	Eze 33'; Mandi (yellow card) 78'; Hartley (yellow card) 83'	Report	González (yellow card) 49'; Angulo 64' (pen.), 90'	Stadium: Tilak Maidan Stadium; Attendance: 0 Referee: A Rowan; Man of the Match: Jorge Ortiz (Goa)

28 December 2020 9	Bengaluru	0–1	Jamshedpur	Margao
19:30 IST	Suresh (yellow card) 32'; Paartalu (yellow card) 62'; Bheke (yellow card) 73'; Silva (yellow card) 87'	Report	Eze 79'	Stadium: Fatorda Stadium; Attendance: 0 Referee: L Ajitkumar Meitei; Man of the Match: Rehenesh TP (Jamshedpur)

10 January 2021 10	Jamshedpur	2–3	Kerala Blasters	Goa, India
19:30 IST	Nerijus Valskis 36', 84'	Report	Costa 22'; Jeakson (yellow card) 38'; Lalruatthara (yellow card) 49' (yellow-red card) 67' Murray 79', 82'	Stadium: Tilak Maidan; Attendance: 0 Referee: L Ajitkumar Meitei; Man of the Match: Murray (KBFC)

14 January 2021 11	Goa	3–0	Jamshedpur	Margao
19:30 IST	Ortiz 19', 52'; González 89'	Report	Alex (yellow card) 66' (yellow-red card) 86'	Stadium: Fatorda Stadium; Attendance: 0 Referee: Rahul Kumar Gupta; Man of the Match: Naveen Kumar (Goa)

17 January 2021 12	Jamshedpur	1–2	NorthEast United	Vasco
19:30 IST	Amarjit (yellow card) 19'; Mobashir (yellow card) 62'; Gahlot (yellow card) 71'; Hartley 89'; Valskis (yellow card) 90'	Report	Mehta 36'; Brown 61' (yellow card) 65'; Apuia (yellow card) 69'	Stadium: Tilak Maidan Stadium; Attendance: 0 Referee: Crystal John; Man of the Match: Federico Gallego (NEUFC)

24 January 2021 13	Jamshedpur	0–0	Hyderabad	Vasco
17:00 IST (UTC+05:30)	Hartley (yellow card) 49'; Lourenco (yellow card) 75'	Report	Sharma (yellow card) 23'	Stadium: Tilak Maidan Stadium; Attendance: 0 Referee: Rahul Kumar Gupta; Man of the Match: Santana (Hyderabad)

27 January 2021 14	Kerala Blasters	0–0	Jamshedpur	Bambolim
19:30 IST		Report	Monroy (yellow card) 72'	Stadium: GMC Athletic Stadium; Attendance: 0 Referee: C R Srikrishna; Man of the Match: Sahal (KBFC)

1 February 2021 15	Odisha	0–1	Jamshedpur	Bambolim
19:30 IST	Taylor (yellow card) 45+3'	Report	Rahman 40'	Stadium: GMC Athletic Stadium; Attendance: 0 Referee: Santhosh Kumar

7 February 2021 16	Jamshedpur	1–2	East Bengal	Margao
17:00 IST	Hartley 83' (yellow card) 90'; Valskis (yellow card) 90'	Report	Steinmann 6'; Pilkington 68'	Stadium: Fatorda Stadium; Attendance: 0 Referee: Crystal John; Man of the Match: Matti Steinmann (East Bengal)

10 February 2021 17	Chennaiyin	0–1	Jamshedpur	Bambolim
19:30 IST	Manuel Lanzarote (yellow card) 66'; Memo (yellow card) 68'	Report	Peter Hartley (yellow card) 74'; Enes Sipovic 90' (o.g.); Ricky Lallawmawma (yellow card) 90'	Stadium: GMC Stadium; Attendance: 0 Referee: Rahul Kumar Gupta; Man of the Match: stephen Eze (Jamshedpur)

14 February 2021 18	ATK Mohun Bagan	1–0	Jamshedpur	Margao, Goa
19:30 IST	McHugh (yellow card) 51'; Krishna 85'	Report	de Lima (yellow card) 87'	Stadium: Fatorda Stadium; Attendance: 0 Referee: Harish Kundu; Man of the Match: Roy Krishna (ATK Mohun Bagan)

20 February 2021 19	Jamshedpur	2–0	Mumbai City	Vasco
19:30 IST	Valskis (yellow card) 66'; Thangjam 72'; Grande 90'	Report	Goddard (yellow card) 79'	Stadium: Tilak Maidan Stadium; Attendance: 0 Referee: Harish Kundu

25 February 2021 20	Jamshedpur	3–2	Bengaluru	Vasco
19:30 IST	Eze 16'; Doungel 34'; Grande 41'	Report	González 62'; Chhetri 71'	Stadium: Tilak Maidan Stadium; Attendance: 0 Referee: Rowan Arumughan

== Statistics ==
=== Goal scorers ===
Rank	No.	Pos.	Player	Indian Super League	Indian Super Cup	Total
1	9	FW	(Lithuania) Nerijus Valskis	8	0	8
2	66	DF	(Nigeria) Stephen Eze	4	0	4
3	10	FW	(Spain) David Grande	2	0	2
3	29	DF	(England) Peter Hartley	2	0	2
5	2	DF	(India) Boris Singh Thangjam	1	0	1
5	11	FW	(India) Aniket Jadhav	1	0	1
5	15	MF	(India) Mobashir Rahman	1	0	1
5	18	FW	(India) Seiminlen Doungel	1	0	1
Own goals				1	0	1
Total				21	0	21

Last updated: 25 February 2021.
Source: FBref

=== Clean sheets ===
Rank	No.	Pos.	Player	Indian Super League	Indian Super Cup	Total
1	32	GK	(India) Rehenesh TP	8	0	8
Total				8	0	8

Last updated: 18 December 2020.
Source: FBref

== See also ==
- 2020–21 in Indian football
- Jamshedpur FC
