= 2017–18 Indian Arrows season =

Indian football club season

Indian Arrows
2017–18 season
- Manager: Luís Norton de Matos
- Stadium: Ambedkar Stadium
- I-League: 10th
- Super Cup: Qualifying Round
- Top goalscorer: League: Abhijit Sarkar (4 goals); All: Abhijit Sarkar (4 goals)
- Highest home attendance: 5,563 vs NEROCA (16 January 2018)
- Lowest home attendance: 218 vs Chennai City (29 November 2017)
- Average home league attendance: 3,256
Home colours	Away colours

The 2017–18 season is Indian Arrows' 4th competitive season in the top-flight of Indian football, I-league. Indian Arrows was formed in 2010 on the behest on then Indian team coach, Bob Houghton, with the main goal of nurturing young talent in India in the hope of qualifying for 2018 FIFA World Cup in Russia. It was disbanded by AIFF in 2013 when their club sponsor, Pailan Group, could not financially support the group.

It was revived again for 2017–18 season and fielded the team in 2017-18 I-League after the successful hosting of 2017 FIFA U-17 World Cup to give more game time to U-17 world cup players and best talent from U-19 players who recently played in 2018 AFC U-19 Championship qualification. They will play in Goa and Delhi as their home grounds.

Indian Arrows ended their I-League campaign on 27 February 2018 finishing last in the league but will not be relegated since it was formed as development side by AIFF. They got selected for qualifying match of 2018 Indian Super Cup but were eliminated losing to Mumbai City.

== Season overview ==
=== November ===
On 14 November, AIFF has named its development side for 2017-18 I-League after disbanding it in 2013. A bit of focus will be on the side that will comprise the best talent from the team that competed in the FIFA U-17 World Cup and the Under-19 team. The idea is to keep the boys together to make the cut for 2019 FIFA U-20 World Cup for which India has submitted a bid application.

On 28 November, AIFF announced squad for this season, consisting mostly of U-17 World-Cup players and some U-19 national players. There are no foreign players in this squad. It is also announced that first 2 home matches will be played in Goa with rest of the home matches to be played in New Delhi.

On 29 November, Indian Arrows started off the I-League campaign on a winning note with 3–0 win against Chennai City at home. Aniket scored a brace followed by a 90th-minute goal from Boris to ensure three points for youngsters. For the first goal, Boris, from his half, relayed ball to Rahul on the right and latter sent in a cross inside a box for Aniket to unleash a powerful shot that found roof of the net. Arrows came up with a counter-attack for second goal which saw Lalrindika latching on long-ball before squaring it for Aniket who shot home to make scoreline 2–0. Boris took advantage of Chennai City's sloppy defence and hammered third goal in 90th minute.

=== December ===
On 5 December goal in each half from William helped Minerva Punjab beat Indian Arrows by 2–0. Khosla laid it for William after a long throw-in by Sukhdev and the powerful long-ranger by the Ghanaian ruptured through the Arrows defence, going past a hapless Dheeraj into the goal in the seventh minute. William brushed aside Jitendra and slotted the ball at the back of the net, this time from Chencho's cross in the 84th minute to seal the win for Minerva Punjab.

On 18 December, Minerva Punjab completely outplayed Indian Arrows but Arrows somehow managed to keep scoreline 0–0 at half-time with brilliant saves from their custodian Dheeraj. The match was headed into certain draw until Chencho scored solitary goal for Minerva and took the match away in 80th minute with a brilliant solo effort.

On 22 December, a goal at the beginning of the each half by Gokulam Kerala helped them register victory over Indian Arrows who produced a spirited performance but failed to post any goals. Gokulam's Addo headed Mirza's corner into Arrow's net for first goal. In 58th minute, Stalin curled a vicious right-footer off a free-kick which beat Gokulam keeper Bilal but struck upright. Al Saleh curled a looping left-footer off free-kick to beat Dheeraj in goal and double Gokulam's lead in 64th minute.

On 26 December, Indian Arrows drub Shillong Lajong 3–0 in an impressive show of passing football. Arrows's quick free-kick took Lajong by surprise and Jitendra beat the opposition to put the ball at the bottom right corner of the goal making him the youngest goal-scorer in I-League. At the hour mark, Lalrohlua's game ended early after he went hard at Arrows forward Rahim Ali, earning his second yellow card to bring Lajong down to 10 men. In 86th minute, Naorem put the game out of Lajong's reach as he dribbled past six defenders and slotted the ball home. Rahul then struck in the first minute of the injury-stoppage time to make it 3–0.

On 29 December, Indian Arrows despite playing with 10-men managed to hold off Mohun Bagan to 1–1 draw at Kolkata. Mohun Bagan took the penalty route to take lead in the 27th minute through Dipanda after Arrows' got penalised for Ashish's contact with Mariners' Nikhil. But Arrows restored parity within 6 minutes when Rahim raced past Kingshuk and Kingsley from the left before Rahul slotting it home. In 65th minute, Amarjit was sent off for the second booking in the match but Arrows put up a solid show with fine saves from Dheeraj to hold on to a draw.

On 31 December, Indian Arrows' custodian Dheeraj's contract expired as he chose to pursue opportunities in Europe.

=== January ===
On 2 January, Indian Arrows failed to score points against table leaders, East Bengal as they went down 0–2 in a home encounter. The two early goals by Amnah and Yusa for visiting side put pressure on Arrows. Arrows came back strongly in an evenly-contested second half but a goal eluded them as they failed to give finishing touches in crucial moments.

On 5 January, A first-half brace by Subhash helped NEROCA outplay a young Indian Arrows side for the majority of the game. Israilov released a well-weighted through-ball into the path of Subhash who chipped Prabshukhan with aplomb. In 45th minute, Chidi split the Arrows defence and Subhash slotted the ball into the net to end the half with a two-goal lead for NEROCA. Birthday boy Abhijit scored a late consolation goal for the Arrows tapping in cross from Rahul.

On 6 January, it has been reported that Arrows players have signed contracts till end of 2019–20 season, except for Jeakson Singh, Anwar Ali and Nongdamba Naorem, who are on loan from Minerva Punjab. They also got Princeton Rebello on loan from Goan FC. AIFF also announced its decision to replace their heroic goalie Dheeraj with U-19 goalkeeper, Lara Singh. FC Goa announced signing of Mohammad Nawaz on January 9.

On 8 January, Indian Arrows lost 0–1 in a hard-fought encounter with Shillong Lajong. Arrows started the match on backfoot as Lajong took more aggressive approach. Lajong attacked Arrows' defence but young goalie Prabshukhan made some impressive saves including Lalmuanpuia's spot-kick after Deepak's handball inside the box. Lajong's winning goal finally came in the 80th minute when forward Koffi raced into the box, past the outstretched Jitendra and delivered a wonderful shot into the roof of the net.

On 12 January, Abhijit was on target as Indian Arrows beat Gokulam Kerala 1–0. Arrows' were steaming in their pursuit of some much-needed points as their defenders, especially Boris did a tremendous job to tame Odafa and make a positive impact in the match. At half-time, Rahim came very close to scoring the opening goal but Bilal jumped at the right time to get hold of the cross flown by Rahul. The deadlock was finally broken by the Abhijit in the 77th minute as Rahul from the left flank tried his luck only for Bilal to palm it away to Abhijit who put the Arrows in lead.

On 16 January, Indian Arrows lost to NEROCA 0–2 in a home encounter conceding one goal in each half. NEROCA had scoring chances but couldn't penetrate Arrows' defence until Anwar Ali committed a mistake to score an own goal in the 18th minute. Arrows later attacked from the flanks but found the going tough against the rival defenders. With the Arrows doing most of the attack, NEROCA played it safe before Chidi scored after getting past Arrows' defender and the keeper to slot the ball into the net.

On 22 January, Indian Arrows lost 0–2 to Churchill Brothers. Churchill Brothers dominated the proceedings throughout but were frustrated by Arrows' defenders until 88th minute. Arrows' made some quick counter moves, especially from Rahul but could not get past defender, Monday and custodian Kithan. Desperate attempts by opposition in dying minutes finally managed to score twice in 88th minute and later in injury-time by defender Ceesey after deflection from Anwar Ali and substitute Gurung through free-kick from Koffi.

On 27 January, Goalkeeper Prabshukhan put up a commendable performance as Indian Arrows held Chennai City to a goalless draw in an away I-League encounter. Chennai City started to make their attacking intentions clear in the first half as they scooped up a number of chances but injuries played the spoilsport as Chennai City's Pradeep and Arrows' forward Rahim Ali have to leave the field. Arrows continued to show composure and maintain their defensive shape until the final whistle which earned them a point.

=== February ===
On 5 February, Omagbemi's late strike with a looped header helped East Bengal to secure a narrow win over Indian Arrows. It was heartbreak for Indian youngsters as they put up a stellar defence, only to fall short in the dying minutes. Earlier, Arrows forward Abhijit had a golden opportunity when he found himself in a one-on-one position with Ubaid but he hit the ball straight at the East Bengal custodian. Later, Stalin set it up with a brilliant cross but Rahul headed it out with Ubaid coming out of his line.

On 10 February, Substitute Abhijit scored two injury-time goals in as many minutes as Indian Arrows rallied to pull off a stunning 2–1 victory over Churchill Brothers. Arrows started the match positively as Naorem threatened in the 8th minute when he picked up Deepak's pass whose curler forced a very good save from Kithan to keep the ball out. But, it was Churchill who broke the deadlock with Nicholas surging forward with the ball to deliver an accurate cross into the box, which was easily nodded in by an unmarked Ceesay. As the match entered the injury time, Abhijit equalised with a right-footed shot from the centre of the box to the top right corner off a Boris assist. He then scored the all-important goal two minutes later.

On 16 February, Aizawl FC drew 2–2 against a resilient Indian Arrows in an away match. Ionescu produced brilliant delivery for Saighani who slotted it past a helpless Prabhsukhan in 40th minute. Indian Arrows was quick to find the equalizer on the 48th minute as Ashish found Lalrindika with an exquisite delivery, who foxed his marker to trigger a shot at the bottom right corner which beat a diving Avilash. Aizawl continued to pile pressure and in 54th minute, Dodoz pierced the net after latching on to a pass from inside the box by Zohmingmawia. The blue colts finally equalized in the dying minutes when skipper Amarjit converted penalty after Lalrosanga brought down Rahul inside the box.

On 23 February, Indian Arrows lost 3–0 to Aizawl F.C. in an away encounter. In the 7th minute, Lalkhawpuimawia skipped past Stalin and shot towards goal but Arrows' custodian Prabhsukhan failed to grab as it found its way to Ionescu who easily found the back of the net. In the 16th minute, Lalkhawpuimawia slipped from the guard of the Arrows defenders and shot only to hit woodwork but didn't miss on the rebound. Lalkhawpuimawia scored his second in the 87th minute after Dodoz provided him with a perfect pass from the back.

On 27 February, Indian Arrows completed their I-League campaign on a losing note after losing 0–2 to Mohun Bagan and finishing last in the league but not relegated being the development team. Jitendra failed to read Watson's long ball into the box as Dicka find back of the net with a half-volley to give Mohun Bagan the lead. In few minutes before half-time, Moghrabi connected to a cross from the left by Gurjinder to double their lead. Anwar Ali and Rahul got their chances in second-half but failed to connect.

On the virtue of finishing outside top-6 in I-League, they have to play qualifier for Indian Super Cup against Mumbai City.

=== March ===
On 16 March, Indian Arrows failed to qualify for 2018 Indian Super Cup after losing 2–1 to Mumbai City in qualifiers. It was even in the first half though Arrows upped their game until in 76th minute when Rahul broke the deadlock by scoring a brilliant goal as he latched on to a perfect through-ball by Aniket. Later, Mumbai equalized eventually through Emaná's penalty kick awarded to them when Ashish brought down Santos inside the box which pulled the game into extra time. Santos scored winner past Prabhsukhan at the flag-end of the first half of the extra time chesting down long ball that knocked Indian Arrows out of the tournament.

== Coaching staff ==
Position	Name
Head coach	(Portugal) Luís Norton de Matos
Team manager	(India) Velu Dhayalamani
Assistant coach	(India) Floyd Pinto
Goalkeeping coach	(India) Mohammed Ansari

== Squad information ==
Indian Arrows project was reinstated after 3 years. On 28 November 2017, AIFF announced squad for this season, consisting mostly of U-17 World-Cup players and some U-19 national players. This is considered as development squad for young and upcoming talent in India.

=== First-team squad ===
No.	Name	Nationality	Date of Birth (Age)
Goalkeepers
20	Prabhsukhan Singh Gill	(India)	2 January 2001 (age 25)
30	Lara Singh	(India)	-
Defenders
2	Boris Singh Thangjam	(India)	3 January 2000 (age 26)
3	Jitendra Singh	(India)	13 June 2001 (age 25)
4	Anwar Ali	(India)	28 August 2000 (age 26)
5	Sanjeev Stalin	(India)	17 January 2001 (age 25)
18	Ashish Rai	(India)	2 February 1999 (age 27)
21	Roshan Singh	(India)	3 March 1999 (age 27)
22	Deepak Tangri	(India)	1 January 1999 (age 27)
25	Sumit Rathi	(India)	17 October 1999 (age 27)
26	Narender Gahlot	(India)	-
Midfielders
6	Suresh Singh Wangjam	(India)	7 August 2000 (age 26)
7	Ninthoinganba Meetei	(India)	13 July 2001 (age 25)
8	Amarjit Singh Kiyam (captain)	(India)	6 January 2001 (age 25)
9	Abhijit Sarkar	(India)	5 January 2000 (age 26)
12	Princeton Rebello	(India)	5 March 1999 (age 27)
13	Lalengmawia	(India)	17 October 2000 (age 26)
15	Jeakson Singh Thounaojam	(India)	21 June 2001 (age 25)
16	Nongdamba Naorem	(India)	2 January 2000 (age 26)
17	Rahul Praveen	(India)	16 March 2000 (age 26)
19	Abhishek Halder	(India)	12 April 1999 (age 27)
23	Namgyal Bhutia	(India)	-
24	Ashish Pradhan	(India)	-
Forwards
10	Edmund Lalrindika	(India)	24 April 1999 (age 27)
11	Aniket Jadhav	(India)	13 July 2000 (age 26)
14	Rahim Ali	(India)	21 April 2000 (age 26)

Last updated: 05 March 2018
Source: Indian Arrows First Team

== Transfers ==
=== In ===
No.	Position	Player	Previous club	Date	Ref
30	GK	(India) Lara Sharma		January 2018	

=== Loan-in ===
No.	Position	Player	Club	Date	Ref
4	DF	(India) Anwar Ali	(India) Minerva Punjab	November 2017	
15	MF	(India) Jeakson Singh Thounaojam	(India) Minerva Punjab	November 2017	
16	MF	(India) Nongdamba Naorem	(India) Minerva Punjab	November 2017	
12	MF	(India) Princeton Rebello	(India) FC Goa	January 2018	

=== Out ===
No.	Position	Player	New club	Date	Ref
1	GK	(India) Dheeraj Singh Moirangthem		1 January 2018	End of contract
1	GK	(India) Mohammad Nawaz	(India) FC Goa	9 January 2018	

== Competitions ==
=== Overview ===
Competition	First match	Last match	Starting round	Final position	Record							
Competition	First match	Last match	Starting round	Final position	Pld	W	D	L	GF	GA	GD	Win %
I-League	29 November 2017	27 February 2018	Matchday 1	10th	18	4	3	11	13	24	−11	22.22
Super Cup	16 March 2018	16 March 2018	Qualifier	Qualifier	1	0	0	1	1	2	−1	0.00
Total					19	4	3	12	14	26	−12	21.05

Last updated: 16 March 2018.
Source: Competitions

=== I-League ===
==== League table ====
Pos	Team	Pld	W	D	L	GF	GA	GD	Pts
6	Shillong Lajong	18	6	4	8	17	25	−8	22
7	Gokulam Kerala	18	6	3	9	17	23	−6	21
8	Chennai City	18	4	7	7	15	24	−9	19
9	Churchill Brothers (Note: Churchill Brothers were relegated, but reinstated after the appeal.)	18	5	2	11	17	28	−11	17
10	Indian Arrows (Note: Indian Arrows were exempted from relegation, as they are an AIFF developmental team.)	18	4	3	11	13	24	−11	15

Source: i-league.org
Rules for classification: 1) points; 2) head-to-head points; 3) head-to-head goal difference; 4) goal difference; 5) number of goals scored; 6) drawing of lots

==== Result summary ====
Overall								Home						Away					
Pld	W	D	L	GF	GA	GD	Pts	W	D	L	GF	GA	GD	W	D	L	GF	GA	GD
18	4	3	11	13	24	−11	15	3	1	5	10	13	−3	1	2	6	3	11	−8

Last updated: 27 February 2018.
Source: i-league.org

==== Results by match ====
Round	1	2	3	4	5	6	7	8	9	10	11	12	13	14	15	16	17	18
Ground	H	H	A	H	H	A	H	A	A	A	H	A	A	A	H	H	A	H
Result	W	L	L	L	W	D	L	L	L	W	L	L	D	L	W	D	L	L
Position	2	5	7	9	6	6	7	8	8	7	7	8	7	9	8	8	10	10 (Note: Indian Arrows were exempted from relegation as they were an AIFF development team.)

Source: i-league.org
A = Away; H = Home; W = Win; D = Draw; L = Loss

==== Matches ====
Win Draw Loss

The fixtures for the 2017–18 season were announced on 13 November 2017.

29 November 2017 1	Indian Arrows	3–0	Chennai City	Bambolim
17:30 IST	Amarjit Singh Kiyam (yellow card) 8'; Aniket Jadhav 20', 58'; Dheeraj Singh (yellow card) 66'; Boris Singh Thangjam 90'	Report		Stadium: GMC Bambolim; Attendance: 218; Referee: Tanmoy Dhar; Man of the Match: Aniket Jadhav (Indian Arrows)

5 December 2017 2	Indian Arrows	0–2	Minerva Punjab	Bambolim
20:00 IST		Report	William Opoku 7', 84'; Kamalpreet Singh (yellow card) 86'	Stadium: GMC Bambolim; Attendance: 776; Referee: Akash Jackson Routh; Man of the Match: William Opoku (Minerva Punjab)

18 December 2017 3	Minerva Punjab	1–0	Indian Arrows	Ludhiana
20:00 IST	Chencho Gyeltshen 80'	Report		Stadium: Guru Nanak Stadium; Attendance: 5,342; Referee: Rahul Kumar Gupta; Man of the Match: Dheeraj Singh (Indian Arrows)

22 December 2017 4	Indian Arrows	0–2	Gokulam Kerala	New Delhi
14:00 IST	Aniket Jadhav (yellow card) 30'; Sanjeev Stalin (yellow card) 64'; Abhishek Halder (yellow card) 79'	Report	Daniel Addo 11'; Khaled Al Saleh 65'; Provat Lakra (yellow card) 90+1'	Stadium: Ambedkar Stadium; Attendance: 3,701; Referee: Rahul Kumar Gupta; Man of the Match: Daniel Addo (Gokulam Kerala)

26 December 2017 5	Indian Arrows	3–0	Shillong Lajong	New Delhi
17:30 IST	Jitendra Singh 19'; Amarjit Singh Kiyam (yellow card) 29'; Suresh Singh Wangjam (yellow card) 29'; Nongdamba Naorem 86'; Rahul Praveen 90+1'	Report	F. Lalrohlua (yellow card) 57' (yellow-red card) 61'; Daniel Odafin (yellow card) 68'; Redeem Tlang (yellow card) 76'	Stadium: Ambedkar Stadium; Attendance: 2,428; Referee: Pratik Mondal; Man of the Match: Jitendra Singh (Indian Arrows)

29 December 2017 6	Mohun Bagan	1–1	Indian Arrows	Kolkata
14:00 IST	Aser Pierrick Dipanda 27' (pen.); Manandeep Singh (yellow card) 71'	Report	Anwar Ali (yellow card) 6'; Rahul Praveen 33'; Amarjit Singh Kiyam (yellow card) 50' (yellow-red card) 65'; Jitendra Singh (yellow card) 90'	Stadium: Mohun Bagan Ground; Attendance: 14,718; Referee: Tejas Nagvenkar; Man of the Match: Dheeraj Singh (Indian Arrows)

2 January 2018 7	Indian Arrows	0–2	East Bengal	New Delhi
14:00 IST	Abhishek Halder (yellow card) 12'	Report	Mahmoud Amnah 13'; Katsumi Yusa 16'	Stadium: Ambedkar Stadium; Attendance: 5,205; Referee: Umesh Bora; Man of the Match: Mahmoud Amnah (East Bengal)

5 January 2018 8	NEROCA	2–1	Indian Arrows	Imphal
14:00 IST	Subhash Singh 39', 44'	Report	Prabhsukhan Gill (yellow card) 17'; Nongdamba Naorem (yellow card) 76'; Boris Singh Thangjam (yellow card) 81'; Abhijit Sarkar 89'	Stadium: Khuman Lampak Main Stadium; Attendance: 35,285; Referee: R Palmson Moses Raj; Man of the Match: Subhash Singh (NEROCA)

8 January 2018 9	Shillong Lajong	1–0	Indian Arrows	Shillong
17:30 IST	Abdoulaye Koffi 80'	Report	Deepak Tangri (yellow card) 35'; Rahul Praveen (yellow card) 41'; Roshan Singh (yellow card) 75'; Jitendra Singh (yellow card) 81'	Stadium: Jawaharlal Nehru Stadium (Shillong); Attendance: 4,600; Referee: Akash Jackson Routh; Man of the Match: Abdoulaye Koffi (Minerva Punjab)

12 January 2018 10	Gokulam Kerala	0–1	Indian Arrows	Kozhikode
17:30 IST		Report	Amarjit Singh Kiyam (yellow card) 54'; Abhijit Sarkar 77'	Stadium: EMS Stadium; Attendance: 8,335; Referee: Tanmoy Dhar; Man of the Match: Abhijit Sarkar (Indian Arrows)

16 January 2018 11	Indian Arrows	0–2	NEROCA	Vasco da Gama
20:00 IST	Suresh Singh Wangjam (yellow card) 85'; Jitendra Singh (yellow card) 88'	Report	Anwar Ali 18' (o.g.); Fabien Vorbe (yellow card) 75'; Gouramangi Singh (yellow card) 90'; Felix Chidi Odili 90+3'	Stadium: Tilak Maidan Stadium; Attendance: 5,563; Referee: C. R. Srikrishna; Man of the Match: Varney Kallon (NEROCA FC)

22 January 2018 12	Churchill Brothers	2-0	Indian Arrows	Margao
20:00 IST	Dawda Ceesay 88'; Wayne Vaz (yellow card) 90'; Israil Gurung 90+2'	Report	Boris Singh Thangjam (yellow card) 81'	Stadium: Fatorda Stadium; Attendance: 2,867; Referee: Pratik Mondal; Man of the Match: Prabhsukhan Singh Gill (Indian Arrows)

27 January 2018 13	Chennai City	0-0	Indian Arrows	Coimbatore
17:30 IST	Henry Monsang Tesong (yellow card) 28' (yellow-red card) 71'; Edwin Sydney Vanspaul (yellow card) 74'	Report	Princeton Rebello (yellow card) 32'; Deepak Tangri (yellow card) 74'; Aniket Jadhav (yellow card) 76'; Rahul Praveen (yellow card) 90'	Stadium: Jawaharlal Nehru Stadium (Coimbatore); Attendance: 7,038; Referee: Crystal John; Man of the Match: Prabhsukhan Singh Gill (Indian Arrows)

5 February 2018 14	East Bengal	1-0	Indian Arrows	Barasat Stadium
20:00 IST	Dudu Omagbemi 90+3'	Report		Attendance: 8,692; Referee: Om Prakash Thakur; Man of the Match: Prabhsukhan Singh Gill (Indian Arrows)

10 February 2018 15	Indian Arrows	2-1	Churchill Brothers	Vasco da Gama
17:30 IST	Abhijit Sarkar 90', 90+3'	Report	Dawda Ceesay 11'; Denchandra Meitei (yellow card) 27'; Wayne Vaz (yellow card) 45+1'	Stadium: Tilak Maidan Stadium; Attendance: 5,491; Referee: Om Prakash Thakur; Man of the Match: Anwar Ali (Indian Arrows)

16 February 2018 16	Indian Arrows	2-2	Aizawl	Vasco da Gama
17:30 IST	Edmund Lalrindika 48'; Amarjit Singh Kiyam 89' (pen.)	Report	Masih Saighani 40'; Leonce Dodoz Zikahi 54'; C Lalrosanga (yellow card) 56' (yellow-red card) 88'	Stadium: Tilak Maidan Stadium; Attendance: 3,175; Referee: C. R. Srikrishna; Man of the Match: Edmund Lalrindika (Indian Arrows)

23 February 2018 17	Aizawl	3-0	Indian Arrows	Aizawl
14:00 IST	Andrei Ionescu 7'; Lalkhawpuimawia 16', 87' (yellow card) 59'; Rochharzela (yellow card) 67'	Report		Stadium: Rajiv Gandhi Stadium (Aizawl); Attendance: 3,200; Referee: Rosario Fernandes; Man of the Match: Lalkhawpuimawia (Aizawl F.C.)

27 February 2018 18	Indian Arrows	0-2	Mohun Bagan	Vasco da Gama
17:30 IST	Deepak Tangri (yellow card) 45+2'	Report	Aser Pierrick Dipanda 26'; Akram Moghrabi 41'	Stadium: Tilak Maidan Stadium; Attendance: 2,743; Referee: Velu Dhayalamani; Man of the Match: Aser Pierrick Dipanda (Mohun Bagan AC)

=== Super Cup ===
On the virtue of finishing outside top-6 in I-League, Indian Arrows have to play qualification match against Mumbai City at Bhubaneshwar. They were eliminated in the qualifiers on losing 2–1 to Mumbai City.

16 March 2018 Q	Mumbai City	2-1 (a.e.t.)	Indian Arrows	Bhubaneshwar
17:00 IST	Achille Emaná 90+1' (pen.); Everton Santos 104'	Report	Aniket Jadhav (yellow card) 68'; Ashish Rai (yellow card) 71'; Rahul Praveen 77'; Boris Singh Thangjam (yellow card) 89'	Stadium: Kalinga Stadium; Referee: Ajitkumar Lairenlakpam; Man of the Match: Rahul Praveen (Indian Arrows)

== Statistics ==
=== Appearances and goals ===
No.	Pos	Nat	Player	Total		I-League		Super Cup	
No.	Pos	Nat	Player	Apps	Goals	Apps	Goals	Apps	Goals
Goalkeepers
20	GK	(India) IND	Prabhsukhan Singh Gill	13	0	12	0	1	0
Defenders
2	DF	(India) IND	Boris Singh Thangjam	13	1	10+2	1	0+1	0
3	DF	(India) IND	Jitendra Singh	17	1	16	1	1	0
4	DF	(India) IND	Anwar Ali	16	0	15	0	1	0
5	DF	(India) IND	Sanjeev Stalin	18	0	17	0	1	0
18	DF	(India) IND	Ashish Rai	10	0	8+1	0	1	0
21	DF	(India) IND	Roshan Singh	3	0	1+2	0	0	0
22	DF	(India) IND	Deepak Tangri	14	0	12+1	0	1	0
26	DF	(India) IND	Narender Gahlot	1	0	0+1	0	0	0
Midfielders
6	MF	(India) IND	Suresh Singh Wangjam	15	0	11+4	0	0	0
7	MF	(India) IND	Ninthoinganba Meetei	9	0	3+6	0	0	0
8	MF	(India) IND	Amarjit Singh Kiyam (captain)	16	1	15	1	1	0
9	MF	(India) IND	Abhijit Sarkar	14	4	7+7	4	0	0
12	MF	(India) IND	Princeton Rebello	4	0	3+1	0	0	0
13	MF	(India) IND	Lalengmawia	3	0	2	0	1	0
15	MF	(India) IND	Jeakson Singh Thounaojam	9	0	8	0	0+1	0
16	MF	(India) IND	Nongdamba Naorem	12	1	6+5	1	1	0
17	MF	(India) IND	Rahul Praveen	17	3	15+1	2	1	1
19	MF	(India) IND	Abhishek Halder	4	0	3+1	0	0	0
23	MF	(India) IND	Namgyal Bhutia	2	0	1+1	0	0	0
24	MF	(India) IND	Ashish Pradhan	1	0	0+1	0	0	0
Forwards
10	FW	(India) IND	Edmund Lalrindika	14	1	9+4	1	1	0
11	FW	(India) IND	Aniket Jadhav	12	2	8+3	2	0+1	0
14	FW	(India) IND	Rahim Ali	17	0	10+7	0	0	0
Players who left club in August/January transfer window or on loan
1	GK	(India) IND	Dheeraj Singh	6	0	6	0	0	0

- Source: us.soccerway.com

Updated: 16 March 2018

=== Goal scorers ===
The list is sorted by shirt number when total goals are equal.

Rnk	Pos	No.	Player	I-League	Super Cup	Total
1	MF	9	(India) Abhijit Sarkar	4	0	4
2	MF	17	(India) Rahul Praveen	2	1	3
3	FW	11	(India) Aniket Jadhav	2	0	2
4	DF	2	(India) Boris Singh Thangjam	1	0	1
4	DF	3	(India) Jitendra Singh	1	0	1
4	MF	8	(India) Amarjit Singh Kiyam	1	0	1
4	FW	10	(India) Edmund Lalrindika	1	0	1
4	MF	16	(India) Nongdamba Naorem	1	0	1

Last updated: 16 March 2018.
Source: us.soccerway.com

=== Clean sheets ===
The list is sorted by shirt number when total clean sheets are equal.

Rnk	No.	Player	I-League	Super Cup	Total
1	1	(India) Dheeraj Singh	2	0	2
1	20	(India) Prabhsukhan Singh	2	0	2

Last updated: 16 March 2018.
Source: us.soccerway.com

=== Disciplinary record ===
Includes all competitive matches. Players listed below made at least one appearance for Indian Arrows during the season.

N	P	Nat.	Name	I-League			Super Cup			Total			Notes
N	P	Nat.	Name	Yellow card	Second yellow card	Red card	Yellow card	Second yellow card	Red card	Yellow card	Second yellow card	Red card	Notes
1	GK	(India)	Dheeraj Singh	1						1			
3	DF	(India)	Boris Singh	2			1			3			
3	DF	(India)	Jitendra Singh	2						2			
4	DF	(India)	Anwar Ali	2						2			
5	DF	(India)	Sanjeev Stalin	1						1			
6	DF	(India)	Suresh Singh	2						2			
8	MF	(India)	Amarjit Singh	3	1					3	1		Missed a game, against East Bengal (red card) (2 January 2018)
11	FW	(India)	Aniket Jadhav	2			1			3			
12	MF	(India)	Princeton Rebello	1						1			
16	MF	(India)	Nongdamba Naorem	1						1			
17	MF	(India)	Rahul Praveen	2						2			
18	DF	(India)	Ashish Rai				1			1			
19	MF	(India)	Abhishek Halder	2						2			
20	GK	(India)	Prabhsukhan Singh	1						1			
21	DF	(India)	Roshan Singh	1						1			
22	DF	(India)	Deepak Tangri	3						3			

Last updated: 16 March 2018
Source: us.soccerway.com
Only competitive matches
(yellow card) = Number of bookings; (second yellow card) = Number of sending offs after a second yellow card; (red card) = Number of sending offs by a direct red card.

== Awards ==
=== Hero of the Match ===
Round	Hero of the Match	Team	Round	Hero of the Match	Team	Round	Hero of the Match	Team
1	(India) Aniket Jadhav	Indian Arrows	7	(Syria) Mahmoud Amnah	East Bengal	13	(India) Prabhsukhan Singh	Indian Arrows
2	(Ghana) William Opoku	Minerva Punjab	8	(India) Subhash Singh	NEROCA	14	(India) Prabhsukhan Singh	Indian Arrows
3	(India) Dheeraj Singh	Indian Arrows	9	(Ivory Coast) Abdoulaye Koffi	Shillong Lajong	15	(India) Anwar Ali	Indian Arrows
4	(Ghana) Daniel Addo	Gokulam Kerala	10	(India) Abhijit Sarkar	Indian Arrows	16	(India) Edmund Lalrindika	Indian Arrows
5	(India) Jitendra Singh	Indian Arrows	11	(Liberia) Varney Kallon	NEROCA	17	(India) Lalkhawpuimawia	Aizawl
6	(India) Dheeraj Singh	Indian Arrows	12	(India) Prabhsukhan Singh	Indian Arrows	18	(Cameroon) Aser Pierrick Dipanda	Mohun Bagan

=== Achievements ===
- Abhijit Sarkar was top Indian goal-scorer for 2017-18 I-League scoring 4 goals in 14 matches.

== Reaction ==
AIFF announced on May 9, 2018, that AIFF technical committee has approved for one-year extension to coach, Luis Norton de Matos and the same needs to be ratified by the executive committee.

== See also ==
- India national under-23 football team
- India national under-19 football team
- India national under-17 football team
