= 2021–22 Jamshedpur FC season =

2021–22 season of Jamshedpur FC

Jamshedpur FC
2021–22 season
- Chairman: (India) Chanakya Chaudhary
- Head coach: (Scotland) Owen Coyle
- Stadium: GMC Athletic Stadium
- Indian Super League: 1st
- AIFF Super Cup: Cancelled
- Durand Cup: Group stage
- ISL Playoffs: Semi-finals
- Top goalscorer: League: Greg Stewart (10 goals); All: Greg Stewart (10 goals)
- Average home league attendance: 🔒 Closed Doors (spectators were allowed in the finals) (Note: Due to the COVID-19 pandemic in India, the 2021–22 Indian Super League season would be held entirely in Goa, behind closed doors, and Kerala Blasters was allotted the Tilak Maidan Stadium as their home ground for the season.)
- Biggest win: 0–4 (vs Odisha (A), 14 December 2021, Indian Super League); 5–1 (vs Odisha (H), 4 March 2022, Indian Super League)
- Biggest defeat: 4–2 (vs Mumbai City (A), 9 December 2022, Indian Super League); 3–1 (vs Bengaluru (A), 5 February 2022, Indian Super League)
Home colours	Away colours
- All statistics correct as of 15 March 2022.

The 2021–22 season is the club's fifth season since its establishment in 2017, and their fifth season in the Indian Super League.

== Players ==
=== Current squad ===
As of 5 February 2022

Note: Flags indicate national team as defined under FIFA eligibility rules; some limited exceptions apply. Players may hold more than one non-FIFA nationality.

No.	Pos.	Nation	Player
1	GK	IND	Pawan Kumar
2	FW	IND	Boris Singh Thangjam
3	MF	IND	Jitendra Singh
4	DF	IND	Laldinpuia
5	DF	IND	Narender Gahlot
6	DF	IND	Ricky Lallawmawma
7	FW	IND	Len Doungel
8	MF	IND	Pronay Halder (on loan from ATK Mohan Bagan)
10	FW	AUS	Jordan Murray
11	FW	IND	Komal Thatal
13	DF	BRA	Eli Sabia
14	MF	BRA	Alex Lima
15	MF	IND	Mobashir Rahman

No.	Pos.	Nation	Player
17	FW	IND	Farukh Choudhary
18	MF	IND	Ritwik Das
19	DF	IND	Sandip Mandi
24	FW	SCO	Greg Stewart
26	DF	IND	Laldinliana Renthlei
29	DF	ENG	Peter Hartley (captain)
30	DF	IND	Anas Edathodika
31	GK	IND	Vishal Yadav
32	GK	IND	Rehenesh TP
45	FW	IND	Ishan Pandita
47	GK	IND	Mohit Dhami
99	FW	NGR	Daniel Chima

=== Out on loan ===
As of 1 September 2021

Note: Flags indicate national team as defined under FIFA eligibility rules; some limited exceptions apply. Players may hold more than one non-FIFA nationality.

No.	Pos.	Nation	Player
—	MF	IND	Bhupender Singh (at Real Kashmir until 31 May 2022)
—	GK	IND	Niraj Kumar (at Real Kashmir until 31 May 2022)

== Pre-season and friendlies ==
27 October 2021 Friendly	Jamshedpur	2–0	North East	Goa
16:00 IST (UTC+05:30)	Murray 5'; Murray 30'

30 October 2021 Friendly	Jamshedpur	1–1	Bengaluru	Goa
16:00 IST (UTC+05:30)	Murray 27'		Rane 15'

9 November 2021 Friendly	Jamshedpur	3–0	Kerala Blasters	Goa
16:00 IST	Boris 18'; Boris 30'; Valskis 33'

12 November 2021 Friendly	Kerala Blasters	1–1	Jamshedpur	Goa
16:00 IST	Dias 18'		Komal 78'

15 November 2021 Friendly	Bengaluru	1–0	Jamshedpur	Goa
16:00 IST	Ramires 25'

== Competitions ==
=== Overview ===
Win Draw Loss

Competition	First match	Last match	Starting round	Record							
Competition	First match	Last match	Starting round	Pld	W	D	L	GF	GA	GD	Win %
Durand Cup	6 September 2021	17 September 2021	Matchday 2	3	1	0	2	2	8	−6	33.33
Indian Super League	21 November 2021	15 March 2022	Matchday 1	22	13	5	4	43	23	+20	59.09
Total				25	14	5	6	45	31	+14	56.00

Last updated: 25 July 2022
Source: Soccerway

=== Durand Cup ===
==== Group stage ====
Pos	Team	Pld	W	D	L	GF	GA	GD	Pts	Qualification
1	Goa	3	3	0	0	9	1	+8	9	Knockout stage
2	Army Green	3	2	0	1	4	3	+1	6	Knockout stage
3	Jamshedpur	3	1	0	2	2	8	−6	3	
4	Sudeva Delhi	3	0	0	3	1	4	−3	0	

Rules for classification: 1) points; 2) head-to-head points; 3) head-to-head goal difference; 4) goal difference; 5) number of goals scored; 6) drawing of lots

=== Indian Super League ===
==== League table ====
Pos	Team	Pld	W	D	L	GF	GA	GD	Pts	Qualification
1	Jamshedpur (L)	20	13	4	3	42	21	+21	43	Qualification to ISL playoffs and Playoffs for 2023–24 AFC Champions League group stage
2	Hyderabad (Note: Hyderabad qualified for Playoffs for 2023–24 AFC Cup qualifying playoffs by winning the ISL playoffs) (C)	20	11	5	4	43	23	+20	38	Qualification to ISL playoffs and Playoffs for 2023–24 AFC Cup qualifying playoffs
3	ATK Mohun Bagan	20	10	7	3	37	26	+11	37	Qualification to ISL playoffs
4	Kerala Blasters	20	9	7	4	34	24	+10	34	Qualification to ISL playoffs
5	Mumbai City	20	9	4	7	36	31	+5	31	

Source: Indian Super League
Rules for classification: 1) points; 2) head-to-head points; 3) head-to-head goal difference; 4) head-to-head goals scored; 5) goal difference; 6) number of goals scored; 7) fair play ranking; 8) drawing of lots
(C) Champions; (L) League Winners' Shield Winners

==== League results by round ====
Match	1	2	3	4	5	6	7	8	9	10	11	12	13	14	15	16	17	18	19	20
Ground	A	A	H	H	A	A	H	A	H	H	H	H	A	H	H	A	A	A	H	A
Result	D	W	D	W	L	W	D	D	L	W	W	W	L	W	W	W	W	W	W	W
League Position	6	2	5	2	4	2	3	3	4	6	3	3	2	2	1	1	1	1	1	1

Updated to match(es) played on 7 March 2022. Source: Indian Super League
A = Away; H = Home; W = Win; D = Draw; L = Loss

==== Matches ====
Note: The initial fixtures were announced in September 2021, and the rest of the matches in December. But the fixtures were revised in January 2022 after a series of COVID-19 cases led to the postponement of several matches.

21 November 2021 1	East Bengal	1–1	Jamshedpur	Vasco da Gama, Goa
19:30 IST	Prce 17'; Das (yellow card) 49'	Report	Hartley 45+6'; Gahlot (yellow card) 79'	Stadium: Tilak Maidan Stadium; Attendance: Closed doors Referee: Crystal John; Man of the Match: Antonio Perošević (East Bengal)

26 November 2021 2	Goa	1–3	Jamshedpur	Bambolim, Goa
19:30 IST	Pereira (yellow card) 60'; Cabrera 86'	Report	Hartley (yellow card) 25'; Valskis 51', 61'; Murray 80'; Gahlot (yellow card) 88'	Stadium: GMC Athletic Stadium; Attendance: Closed doors Referee: Senthil Nathan S Man of the Match: Nerijus Valskis (Jamshedpur)

2 December 2021 3	Jamshedpur	1–1	Hyderabad	Bambolim, Goa
19:30 IST	Stewart 41' (yellow card) 80'; Renthlei (yellow card) 90'	Report	Ogbeche 57'; Victor (yellow card) 83'	Stadium: GMC Athletic Stadium; Attendance: Closed doors Referee: Pratik Mondal; Man of the Match: Greg Stewart (Jamshedpur)

6 December 2021 4	Jamshedpur	2–1	ATK Mohun Bagan	Bambolim, Goa
19:30 IST	Sabiá (yellow card) 3'; Doungel 37'; Halder (yellow card) 75'; Stewart (yellow card) 82'; Rehenesh (yellow card) 84'; Lima 84'	Report	Krishna (yellow card) 45+1'; Boumous (yellow card) 75'; Kotal 88'	Stadium: GMC Athletic Stadium; Attendance: Closed doors Referee: Rowan Arumughan; Man of the Match: Jitendra Singh (Jamshedpur)

9 December 2021 5	Mumbai City	4–2	Jamshedpur	Margao, Goa
19:30 IST	Cássio 3'; Apuia (yellow card) 11'; Bipin 17'; Angulo 24'; Catatau 70'	Report	Hartley (yellow card) 19'; Thatal 48'; Sabiá 55'	Stadium: Fatorda Stadium; Attendance: Closed doors Referee: Aditya Purkayastha; Man of the Match: Cássio Gabriel (Mumbai City)

14 December 2021 6	Odisha	0–4	Jamshedpur	Vasco da Gama, Goa
19:30 IST	Antonay (yellow card) 45'; Lalruatthara (yellow card) 76'	Report	Hartley 3' (yellow card) 53'; Stewart 4', 21', 35'; Doungel (yellow card) 60'	Stadium: Tilak Maidan Stadium; Attendance: Closed doors Referee: CR Srikrishna; Man of the Match: Greg Stewart (Jamshedpur)

20 December 2021 7	Jamshedpur	0–0	Bengaluru	Bambolim, Goa
19:30 IST	Singh (yellow card) 57'	Report		Stadium: GMC Athletic Stadium; Attendance: Closed doors Referee: Senthil Nathan S Man of the Match: Greg Stewart (Jamshedpur)

26 December 2021 8	Kerala Blasters	1–1	Jamshedpur	Vasco da Gama, Goa
19:30 IST	Díaz (yellow card) 19'; Sahal 27'; Lešković (yellow card) 90+3'	Report	Stewart 14' (yellow card) 48'	Stadium: Tilak Maidan Stadium; Attendance: Closed doors Referee: Pratik Mondal; Man of the Match: Greg Stewart (Jamshedpur)

2 January 2022 9	Jamshedpur	0–1	Chennaiyin	Bambolim, Goa
21:30 IST	Gahlot (yellow card) 22'; Lallawmawma (yellow card) 48'; Lima (yellow card) 83'	Report	Gikiewicz 31' (yellow card) 84'	Stadium: GMC Athletic Stadium; Attendance: Closed doors Referee: Pranjal Banerjee; Man of the Match: Mohammad Sajid Dhot (Chennaiyin)

6 January 2022 10	Jamshedpur	3–2	NorthEast United	Bambolim, Goa
19:30 IST	Murray 44'; Boris 56'; Pandita 90+3'	Report	Brown 4', 90+1'; Shereef (yellow card) 70'	Stadium: GMC Athletic Stadium; Attendance: Closed doors Referee: Rowan Arumughan; Man of the Match: Ishan Pandita (Jamshedpur)

11 January 2022 11	Jamshedpur	1–0	East Bengal	Bambolim, Goa
19:30 IST	Pandita 88'	Report		Stadium: GMC Athletic Stadium; Attendance: Closed doors Referee: Crystal John; Man of the Match: Greg Stewart (Jamshedpur)

~~17 January 2022~~ ~~12~~	Hyderabad	Postponed	Jamshedpur	Bambolim, Goa
19:30 IST				Stadium: GMC Athletic Stadium; Attendance: Closed doors
Note: This match was postponed due to the COVID-19 cases in the camp prior to the game.

~~21 January 2022~~ ~~13~~	Jamshedpur	Postponed	Mumbai City	Bambolim, Goa
19:30 IST				Stadium: GMC Athletic Stadium; Attendance: Closed doors
Note: This match was postponed due to the COVID-19 cases in the camp prior to the game.

28 January 2022 12	Jamshedpur	1–0	Goa	Bambolim, Goa
19:30 IST	Lima (yellow card) 26'; Chukwu (yellow card) 39' (goal) 49'; Edathodika (yellow card) 81'; Hartley (yellow card) 88'	Report	Ali (yellow card) 32'; Bedia (yellow card) 90+4'	Stadium: GMC Athletic Stadium; Attendance: Closed doors Referee: Aditya Purkayastha; Man of the Match: Rehenesh TP (Jamshedpur)

5 February 2022 13	Bengaluru	3–1	Jamshedpur	Bambolim, Goa
19:30 IST	Chhetri 55'; Silva 62', 90+4'	Report	Chukwu 1'	Stadium: GMC Athletic Stadium; Attendance: Closed doors Referee: CR Srikrishna; Man of the Match: Bruno Ramires (Bengaluru)

10 February 2022 14	Jamshedpur	3–0	Kerala Blasters	Bambolim, Goa
19:30 IST	Chukwu (yellow card) 20' (goal) 53'; Stewart 45' (pen.), 48' (pen.); Hartley (yellow card) 83'	Report	Lešković (yellow card) 47'; Luna (yellow card) 53'; Singh (yellow card) 81'; Khabra (yellow card) 82'	Stadium: GMC Athletic Stadium; Attendance: Closed doors Referee: Ashwin; Man of the Match: Greg Stewart (Jamshedpur)

17 February 2022 15	Jamshedpur	3–2	Mumbai City	Bambolim, Goa
19:30 IST	Stewart 9', 90+4' (pen.); Das 30'; Hartley (yellow card) 70'; Murray (yellow card) 82'	Report	Jahouh (yellow card) 11'; Bheke 57'; Angulo (penalty missed); Vikram (yellow card) 81'; Maurício 86' (pen.)	Stadium: GMC Athletic Stadium; Attendance: Closed doors Referee: Harish Kundu; Man of the Match: Greg Stewart (Jamshedpur)

20 February 2022 16	Chennaiyin	1–4	Jamshedpur	Vasco da Gama, Goa
19:30 IST	Ali (yellow card) 39'; Valskis 62'; Devrani (yellow card) 79'; Vanspaul (yellow card) 81'; Borysiuk (yellow card) 90+2'	Report	Das 23'; Sabiá (yellow card) 28'; Boris 33'; Chukwu 40'; Devrani 46' (o.g.)	Stadium: GMC Athletic Stadium; Attendance: Closed doors Referee: Tejas Nagvenkar; Man of the Match: Mobashir Rahman (Jamshedpur)

25 February 2022 17	NorthEast United	2–3	Jamshedpur	Margao, Goa
19:30 IST	Santana (yellow card) 42'; Diallo (yellow card) 45+2'; Gurjinder (yellow card) 48'; Shereef (yellow card) 53'; Laldanmawia 66'; Marcelinho 67' (yellow card) 90+7'	Report	Doungel 35'; Halder (yellow card) 52'; Stewart 59' (yellow card) 90+6'; Murray 84'	Stadium: Fatorda Stadium; Attendance: Closed doors Referee: Rowan Arumughan; Man of the Match: Ricky Lallawmawma (Jamshedpur)

1 March 2022 18	Hyderabad	0–3	Jamshedpur	Bambolim, Goa
19:30 IST	Yasir (yellow card) 37'; Jadhav (yellow card) 45+2'; Poojary (yellow card) 66'; Siverio (yellow card) 79'	Report	Sana 5' (o.g.); Hartley 28'; Chukwu 65'; Rahman (red card) 68'	Stadium: GMC Athletic Stadium; Attendance: Closed doors Referee: Ramachandran Venkatesh; Man of the Match: Alex Lima (Jamshedpur)

4 March 2022 18	Jamshedpur	5–1	Odisha	Bambolim, Goa
19:30 IST	Chukwu 23', 26'; Das 54'; Murray 71'; Pandita 87'	Report	Jonathas (yellow card) 20' (yellow-red card) 73'; Mongil (yellow card) 25'; Thoiba (yellow card) 49'; Ramfangzauva 45+1'	Stadium: GMC Athletic Stadium; Attendance: Closed doors Referee: Pratik Mondal; Man of the Match: Daniel Chima Chukwu (Jamshedpur)

7 March 2022 20	ATK Mohun Bagan	0–1	Jamshedpur	Margao, Goa
19:30 IST	Tiri (yellow card) 90+6'	Report	Halder (yellow card) 10'; Chukwu (yellow card) 13'; Stewart (yellow card) 39'; Das 57'; Laldinpuia (yellow card) 84'	Stadium: Fatorda Stadium; Attendance: Closed doors Referee: Crystal John; Man of the Match: Peter Hartley (Jamshedpur)

=== Indian Super League Playoffs ===
==== Matches ====
11 March 2022 Semi-finals 1st leg	Jamshedpur	0–1	Kerala Blasters	Margao, Goa
19:30 IST	Lima (yellow card) 87'	Report	Sahal 38' (yellow card) 81'; Vázquez (yellow card) 63'	Stadium: Fatorda Stadium; Attendance: Closed doors Referee: Tejas Nagvenkar; Man of the Match: Ruivah Hormipam (Kerala Blasters)

15 March 2022 Semi-finals 2nd leg	Kerala Blasters	1–1 (2–1 agg.)	Jamshedpur	Vasco da Gama, Goa
19:30 IST	Luna 18'; Adhikari (yellow card) 32'; Jeakson (yellow card) 57'; Puitea (yellow card) 82'; Gill (yellow card) 87'	Report	Halder 50'; Lallawmawma (yellow card) 90+4'	Stadium: Tilak Maidan Stadium; Attendance: Closed doors Referee: Harish Kundu; Man of the Match: Adrián Luna (Kerala Blasters)

== Statistics ==
Jamshedpur FC claimed a number of records this season ie Most no of wins in a row, Least goals conceded in a season, and the Highest Goal Difference of the 2021-22 ISL season.

=== Goal scorers ===
Rank	No.	Pos.	Player	Indian Super League	Indian Super Cup	Total
1	24	FW	(Scotland) Greg Stewart	10	0	10
2	99	FW	(Nigeria) Daniel Chima	7	0	7
3	18	MF	(India) Ritwik Das	4	0	4
3	10	DF	(Australia) Jordan Murray	4	0	4
5	45	FW	(India) Ishan Pandita	3	0	3
5	29	DF	(England) Peter Hartley	3	0	3
7	9	FW	(Lithuania) Nerijus Valskis	2	0	2
7	2	MF	(India) Boris Singh	2	0	2
7	7	FW	(India) Seiminlen Doungel	2	0	2
10	11	FW	(India) Komal Thatal	1	0	1
10	8	MF	(India) Pronay Halder	1	0	1
10	13	DF	(Brazil) Eli Sabia	1	0	1
10	14	MF	(Brazil) Alex Lima	1	0	1
Own goals				0	0	0
Total				42	0	42

Source: IndianSuperLeague

=== Clean sheets ===
Rank	No.	Pos.	Player	Indian Super League	Indian Super Cup	Total
1	32	GK	(India) Rehenesh TP	6	0	6
2	1	GK	(India) Pawan Kumar	1	0	1
Total				7	0	7

Source: IndianSuperLeague
