= 2018–19 Indian Arrows season =

Indian football club season

Indian Arrows
2018–19 season
- Manager: Floyd Pinto
- Stadium: Barabati Stadium, Kalinga Stadium
- I-League: 8th
- Super Cup: Round of 16
- Top goalscorer: Rohit Danu (4 goals)
- Highest home attendance: 4,520
- Lowest home attendance: 100
- Average home league attendance: 1,640
Home colours	Away colours

The 2018–19 season is Indian Arrows' 5th competitive season in the top-flight of Indian football, I-league. Indian Arrows was formed in 2010 on the behest on then Indian team coach, Bob Houghton, with the main goal of nurturing young talent in India in the hope of qualifying for 2018 FIFA World Cup in Russia. It was disbanded by AIFF in 2013 when their club sponsor, Pailan Group, could not financially support the group. But revived again in 2017-18 season immediately after FIFA U-17 World Cup.

It was revived again for 2017–18 season and fielded the team in 2017-18 I-League after the successful hosting of 2017 FIFA U-17 World Cup to give more game time to U-17 world cup players and best talent from U-19 players who recently played in 2018 AFC U-19 Championship qualification. They played in Goa and Delhi as their home grounds.

Indian Arrows ended their I-League campaign on 27 February 2018 finishing last in the league but will not be relegated since it was formed as development side by AIFF. They got selected for qualifying match of 2018 Indian Super Cup but were eliminated losing to Mumbai City.

They finished 8th among 11 clubs in I-League 2018-19 season winning 6 games, drawing 3 and losing the rest 19. They scored 11 goals conceding 28. Although after their I-League season, they were successful in reaching Super Cup 2019 edition's round of 16 defeating Kerala Blasters FC by 2-0 margin. They got knocked out by eventual Champions FC Goa by 3-0 margin.

== Coaching staff ==
Position	Name
Head coach	(India) Floyd Pinto

== Squad information ==
Indian Arrows project was reinstated after 3 years. On 28 November 2017, AIFF announced squad for this season, consisting mostly of U-17 World-Cup players and some U-19 national players. This is considered as development squad for young and upcoming talent in India.

=== First-team squad ===
No.	Name	Nationality	Date of Birth (Age)
Goalkeepers
20	Prabhsukhan Singh Gill	(India)	2 January 2001 (aged 17)
31	Lovepreet Singh	(India)	10 September 1998 (aged 20)
32	Lalbiakhlua Jongte	(India)	23 July 2002 (aged 16)
31	Samik Mitra	(India)	1 December 2000 (aged 17)
Defenders
3	Jitendra Singh	(India)	13 June 2001 (aged 17)
4	Anwar Ali	(India)	28 August 2000 (aged 18)
5	Narender Gahlot	(India)	24 April 2001 (aged 17)
12	Akash Mishra	(India)	27 November 2001 (aged 16)
13	Dalbir Singh	(India)	27 December 2001 (aged 16)
18	Shabas Ahammed	(India)	1 January 2002 (aged 16)
18	Ashish Rai	(India)	27 January 1999 (aged 19)
19	Reamsochung Chongompipa Aimol	(India)	14 February 2000 (aged 18)
22	Deepak Tangri	(India)	1 February 1999 (aged 19)
26	Gurkirat Singh	(India)	16 July 2003 (aged 15)
36	Bijay Chhetri	(India)	7 July 2001 (aged 17)
Midfielders
2	Boris Singh Thangjam	(India)	3 January 2000 (aged 18)
6	Suresh Singh Wangjam	(India)	7 August 2000 (aged 18)
7	Ninthoinganba Meetei	(India)	13 July 2001 (aged 17)
8	Amarjit Singh Kiyam (captain)	(India)	6 January 2001 (aged 17)
15	Jeakson Singh Thounaojam	(India)	21 June 2001 (aged 17)
16	Givson Singh	(India)	5 June 2002 (aged 16)
17	Rahul Praveen	(India)	16 March 2001 (aged 17)
20	Harmanpreet Singh	(India)	2 September 2001 (aged 17)
21	Sanjeev Stalin	(India)	17 January 2001 (aged 17)
23	Lalengmawia	(India)	17 October 2000 (aged 18)
24	Vikram Pratap Singh	(India)	16 January 2002 (aged 16)
34	Ricky John Shabong	(India)	29 December 2002 (aged 15)
35	Ridge Demello	(India)	18 February 2002 (aged 16)
Forwards
9	Rahim Ali	(India)	21 April 2000 (aged 18)
10	Abhijit Sarkar	(India)	5 January 2000 (aged 18)
11	Aniket Jadhav	(India)	13 July 2000 (aged 18)
24	Rohit Danu	(India)	10 July 2002 (aged 16)

Last updated: 01 January 2020
Source: Indian Arrows First Team

== Competitions ==
=== Overview ===
Competition	First match	Last match	Starting round	Final position	Record							
Competition	First match	Last match	Starting round	Final position	Pld	W	D	L	GF	GA	GD	Win %
I-League	26 October 2018	09 March 2019	Matchday 1	8th	20	6	3	11	19	28	−9	30.00
Super Cup	16 March 2018	16 March 2018	Round of 16	Qualifier	2	1	0	1	2	4	−2	50.00
Total					22	7	3	12	21	32	−11	31.82

Last updated: 16 March 2019.
Source: Competitions

=== I-League ===
==== League table ====
Pos	Team	Pld	W	D	L	GF	GA	GD	Pts
6	NEROCA	20	7	5	8	27	26	+1	26
7	Aizawl	20	6	6	8	27	28	−1	24
8	Indian Arrows	20	6	3	11	19	28	−9	21
9	Minerva Punjab	20	4	6	10	10	19	−9	18 (Note: The game between Minerva Punjab and Real Kashmir was rescheduled, but eventually it was not played and both teams were awarded a point.)
10	Gokulam Kerala	20	3	8	9	25	33	−8	17

Source: I-league
Rules for classification: 1) points; 2) head-to-head points; 3) head-to-head goal difference; 4) goal difference; 5) number of goals scored; 6) drawing of lots

== Matches ==
Win Draw Loss

26 November 2018 1	Chennai City FC	4-1	Indian Arrows	Coimbatore
	Pedro Manzi; Romario Jesuraj 76'		Amarjit Singh Kiyam 2'	Stadium: Jawaharlal Nehru Stadium
