= Princeton Rebello =

Indian footballer (born 1999)

Personal information
- Date of birth: 5 March 1999 (age 27)
- Place of birth: Betalbatim, Goa, India
- Height: 1.73 m (5 ft 8 in)
- Positions: Attacking midfielder; central midfielder

Team information
- Current team: Punjab

Youth career
- Velsao Pale Sports Club
- Betalbatim Sports Club
- 2014: Queens Park Rangers
- 2015–2016: Betalbatim Sports Club
- 2016: AIFF Elite Academy
- 2016–2017: Sporting Goa
- 2016: Vasco
- 2017: → Penha de Franca (loan)

Senior career*
Years	Team	Apps	(Gls)
2017–2023	Goa	45	(0)
2017–2018	→ Indian Arrows (loan)	4	(0)
2023–2024	Odisha	20	(1)
2024–	Punjab	3	(0)

International career^{‡}
2017	India U20	4	(2)
- * Club domestic league appearances and goals as of 16:30, 16 March 2026 (UTC) ‡ National team caps and goals as of 6 January 2020

Princeton Rebello (born 5 March 1999) is an Indian professional footballer who plays as a midfielder for Indian Super League club Punjab.

== Career ==
=== Early career ===
Born in Betalbatim, Goa, Rebello started playing football at the age of four and would constantly play alongside the kids in his neighborhood. While playing in an under-8 football tournament, Eban Mesquita, a coach for Betalbatim-based Velsao Pale Sports Club, scouted Rebello and got him to join Velsao Pale. A few years ago, after impressing enough during an under-13 tournament to be named the Emerging Player of the Tournament, Rebello was reportedly told by then Dempo head coach Armando Colaco that he would like to take Rebello to the club eventually as a senior player, but after playing with Betalbatim Sports Club.

In July 2014, Rebello moved out of India to England and joined the under-15 side for Queens Park Rangers. He stayed at the English football academy for six months before returning to India to rejoin Batalbatim. He would soon join the AIFF Elite Academy before moving back to England. Since he was only able to secure a six-month permit, Queens Park Rangers sent him on trial with Watford. Watford offered him a chance in their academy but it would have required Rebello to concede his Indian citizenship for Portuguese. Rebello rejected the move to change his nationality and moved back to India.

In mid-2016, Rebello re-joined his former head coach, Eban Mesquita, at Goa Professional League side Vasco. During his time with Vasco, Rebello recorded six assists and three goals. He was soon also selected to join Goa's football team for the Santosh Trophy but was not selected in the end for unknown reasons. After spending some time with Vasco, Rebello moved to Sporting Goa, where he would be part of the team's youth squad.

==== Indian Arrows ====
In January 2018, Rebello joined Indian Arrows, the All India Football Federation's developmental squad, in the I-League on loan from Goa. He made his professional debut for the club on 8 January 2018 against Shillong Lajong. He came on as a 46th-minute substitute for Abhijit Sarkar as Indian Arrows lost 1–0.

=== Goa ===
In April 2017, Goa of the Indian Super League announced that they would be opening a developmental squad and that Rebello was one of the members of the squad. On 23 October 2019, Rebello made his Goa debut, coming on in the 87th minute as Goa beat Chennaiyin 3–0 in the Indian Super League.

== International ==
Rebello participated with the India U19 side during the 2017 SAFF U-18 Championship. In India's first match of the tournament, Rebello scored from a 30-yard freekick but it wasn't enough to prevent India from getting a defeat, 4–3. A couple months later, in November 2017, Rebello was called up again for India's 2018 AFC U-19 Championship qualifiers.

== Career statistics ==
As of 24 February 2021

Club	Season	League			Cup		Continental		Total	
Club	Season	Division	Apps	Goals	Apps	Goals	Apps	Goals	Apps	Goals
Goa	2018–19	Indian Super League	0	0	0	0	—	—	0	0
Goa	2019–20	Indian Super League	8	0	0	0	—	—	8	0
Goa	2020–21	Indian Super League	16	0	0	0	—	—	16	0
Indian Arrows (loan)	2017–18	I-League	4	0	0	0	—	—	4	0
Career total			28	0	0	0	0	0	28	0

== Honours ==
FC Goa

- Indian Super Cup: 2019
- Goa Professional League: 2018–19
- Durand Cup: 2021

Odisha

- Super Cup: 2023

== See also ==
- List of Indian football players in foreign leagues
