= Jitendra Singh (footballer) =

Indian footballer (born 2001)

Personal information
- Full name: Jitendra Singh
- Date of birth: 13 June 2001 (age 25)
- Place of birth: Kolkata, India
- Height: 1.69 m (5 ft 7 in)
- Position: Defensive midfielder

Team information
- Current team: Inter Kashi
- Number: 14

Youth career
- AIFF Elite Academy

Senior career*
Years	Team	Apps	(Gls)
2017–2019	Indian Arrows	30	(1)
2019–2024	Jamshedpur	59	(0)
2024–2026	Chennaiyin	16	(0)
2026–	Inter Kashi	2	(0)

International career^{‡}
2015–2018	India U17	30	(0)
2017–2019	India U20	2	(0)
2023	India U23	2	(0)
- * Club domestic league appearances and goals as of 17 October 2026 ‡ National team caps and goals as of 09:56, 12 September 2023 (UTC)

Jitendra Singh (born 13 June 2001) is an Indian professional footballer who plays as a midfielder for Indian Super League club Inter Kashi. He has represented India in the 2017 FIFA U-17 World Cup.

== Club career ==
Born in Kolkata, Singh was part of the AIFF Elite Academy batch that was preparing for the 2017 FIFA U-17 World Cup to be hosted in India. After the tournament, Singh was selected to play for Indian Arrows, an All India Football Federation-owned team that would consist of India under-20 players to give them playing time. He made his professional debut for the side in the Arrows' first match of the season against Chennai City. He started and helped the team keep the clean sheet as Indian Arrows won 3–0.

A month later, on 26 December, Singh scored his first professional goal against Shillong Lajong. His 19th-minute goal was the first in a 3–0 victory for Indian Arrows.

== International career ==
Singh represented the India under-17 side which participated in the 2017 FIFA U-17 World Cup. He also played in the 2019 Granatkin Memorial tournament.

== Career statistics ==
=== Club ===
As of 28 August 2025

Club	Season	League			Cup		AFC		Total	
Club	Season	Division	Apps	Goals	Apps	Goals	Apps	Goals	Apps	Goals
Indian Arrows	2017–18	I-League	16	1	1 (Note: Appearance(s) in Super Cup)	0	–		17	1
Indian Arrows	2018-19	I-League	14	0	1	0	–		15	0
Indian Arrows	Total		30	1	2	0	0	0	32	1
Jamshedpur	2019–20	Indian Super League	8	0	0	0	–		8	0
Jamshedpur	2020–21	Indian Super League	9	0	0	0	–		9	0
Jamshedpur	2021–22	Indian Super League	19	0	2 (Note: Appearance(s) in Durand Cup)	1	–		21	1
Jamshedpur	2022–23	Indian Super League	13	0	4	0	–		17	0
Jamshedpur	2023–24	Indian Super League	10	0	3	0	–		13	0
Jamshedpur	Total		59	0	9	1	0	0	68	1
Chennaiyin	2024–25	Indian Super League	15	0	1	0	–		16	0
Chennaiyin	2025–26	Indian Super League	0	0	2	0	–		2	0
Chennaiyin	Total		15	0	3	0	0	0	18	0
Career total			104	1	14	1	0	0	118	2
