= Boris Singh Thangjam =

Indian footballer (born 2000)

Boris Singh
Personal information
- Full name: Boris Singh Thangjam
- Date of birth: 3 January 2000 (age 26)
- Place of birth: Imphal, Manipur, India
- Height: 1.61 m (5 ft 3 in)
- Positions: Winger; right-back

Team information
- Current team: East Bengal

Youth career
- AIFF Elite Academy

Senior career*
Years	Team	Apps	(Gls)
2017–2018	Indian Arrows	12	(1)
2018–2020	ATK	0	(0)
2018–2019	→ Indian Arrows (loan)	19	(1)
2020–2021	Mohun Bagan	0	(0)
2021–2023	Jamshedpur	41	(5)
2023–2026	Goa	63	(4)
2026–	East Bengal	0	(0)

International career^{‡}
2015	India U17	31	(4)
2017	India U20	3	(0)
2025–	India	5	(0)
Medal record
Representing India
CAFA Nations Cup
Third place	2025 Tajikistan–Uzbekistan	Team
- * Club domestic league appearances and goals as of 18:38, 18 May 2026 (UTC) ‡ National team caps and goals as of 29 August 2025 (UTC)

Boris Singh Thangjam (Meitei: Thangjam Boris Singh, born 3 January 2000) is an Indian professional footballer who plays as a winger for Indian Super League club East Bengal and the India national team.

== Club career ==
Born in Manipur, Thangjam was part of the AIFF Elite Academy batch that was preparing for the 2017 FIFA U-17 World Cup to be hosted in India. After the tournament, Thangjam was selected to play for the Indian Arrows, an All India Football Federation-owned team that would consist of India under-20 players to give them playing time. He made his professional debut for the side in the Arrow's first match of the season against Chennai City. He started and scored the third and final goal in the 90th minute for the Indian Arrows as they won 3–0.

== International career ==
Thangjam represented the India under-17 side which participated in the 2017 FIFA U-17 World Cup which was hosted in India.

Thangjam made his debut for India national team on 19 March 2025 in a friendly against the Maldives.

== Career statistics ==
=== Club ===
As of 21 April 2023

Club	Season	League			National Cup		League Cup		AFC		Total	
Club	Season	Division	Apps	Goals	Apps	Goals	Apps	Goals	Apps	Goals	Apps	Goals
Indian Arrows	2017–18	I-League	12	1	0	0	1 (Note: Appearance(s) in Super Cup)	0	—		13	1
Indian Arrows (loan)	2018–19	I-League	19	1	0	0	2	0	—		21	1
ATK	2019–20	Indian Super League	0	0	1 (Note: Appearance(s) in Durand Cup)	0	0	0	—		1	0
Mohun Bagan	2020–21	Indian Super League	0	0	0	0	0	0	—		0	0
Jamshedpur	2020–21	Indian Super League	3	1	0	0	0	0	—		3	1
Jamshedpur	2021–22	Indian Super League	18	2	0	0	0	0	—		18	2
Jamshedpur	2022–23	Indian Super League	20	2	0	0	3	2	1 (Note: Appearance(s) in Qualifier for AFC Champions League group stage)	0	24	4
Jamshedpur	Jamshedpur total		41	5	0	0	3	2	1	0	45	7
Goa	2023–24	Indian Super League	0	0	0	0	0	0	—		0	0
Career total			72	7	1	0	6	2	1	0	80	9

=== International ===
As of 29 August 2025

National team	Year	Apps	Goals
India	2025	5	0
Total		5	0

== Honours ==
Jamshedpur

- Indian Super League premiership: 2021–22
