= Aniket Jadhav =

Indian footballer (born 2000)

Personal information
- Full name: Aniket Anil Jadhav
- Date of birth: 13 July 2000 (age 26)
- Place of birth: Kolhapur, Maharashtra
- Height: 1.73 m (5 ft 8 in)
- Position: Winger

Team information
- Current team: Calicut

Youth career
- 2012–2015: Pune
- 2015–2017: AIFF Elite Academy

Senior career*
Years	Team	Apps	(Gls)
2017–2018	Indian Arrows	11	(2)
2018–2021	Jamshedpur	27	(2)
2018–2019	→ Indian Arrows (loan)	7	(0)
2021–2022	Hyderabad	20	(2)
2022–2023	East Bengal	6	(0)
2023–2024	Odisha	23	(0)
2024–2025	Jamshedpur	7	(0)
2025–	Calicut	4	(0)

International career^{‡}
2015–2017	India U17	30	(2)
2022–	India	2	(0)
- * Club domestic league appearances and goals as of 14:25, 9 February 2025 (UTC) ‡ National team caps and goals as of 19:30, 23 March 2022 (UTC)

Aniket Anil Jadhav (Marathi: अनिकेत अनिल जादव; born 13 July 2000) is an Indian professional footballer who plays as a forward.

== Early life ==
Jadhav was born in Kolhapur, Maharashtra. He is first football player from Kolhapur who has represented Indian national team.

== Club career ==
Jadhav was part of the AIFF Elite Academy batch that was preparing for the 2017 FIFA U-17 World Cup to be hosted in India. After the tournament, Jadhav was selected to play for the Indian Arrows, an All India Football Federation-owned team that would consist of India under-20 players to give them playing time. He made his professional debut for the side in the Arrow's first match of the season against Chennai City. He started and scored a brace as Indian Arrows won 3–0.

On 5 March 2019, Jadhav joined Blackburn Rovers for a 3-month training spell at their academy.

Jadav joined the ISL side East Bengal from Hyderabad in August 2022. After a small stint, he signed for Odisha in January 2023.

== International career ==
Jadhav represented the India under-17 side in the 2017 FIFA U-17 World Cup which was hosted in India. He is first football player from Kolhapur who has represented Indian national team

In March 2022, Jadav was called up for the national squad by coach Igor Štimac ahead of India's two friendly matches against Bahrain and Belarus.

== Career statistics ==
As of 4 June 2023

Club	Season	League			Super Cup		Durand Cup		AFC		Total	
Club	Season	Division	Apps	Goals	Apps	Goals	Apps	Goals	Apps	Goals	Apps	Goals
Indian Arrows	2017–18	I-League	11	2	1	0	–		–		12	2
Indian Arrows (loan)	2018–19	I-League	7	0	0	0	–		–		7	0
Jamshedpur	2019–20	Indian Super League	13	1	–		0	0	–		13	1
Jamshedpur	2020–21	Indian Super League	14	1	–		–		–		14	1
Hyderabad	2021-22	Indian Super League	20	2	–		0	0	–		20	2
East Bengal	2022–23	Indian Super League	6	0	–		3	0	–		9	0
Odisha	2022–23	Indian Super League	6	0	4	0	–		1 (Note: Appearance in AFC Cup playoff)	0	6	0
Career total			77	6	5	0	3	0	1	0	86	6

== Honours ==
Hyderabad

- Indian Super League: 2021–22
