= Prabhsukhan Singh Gill =

Indian footballer (born 2001)

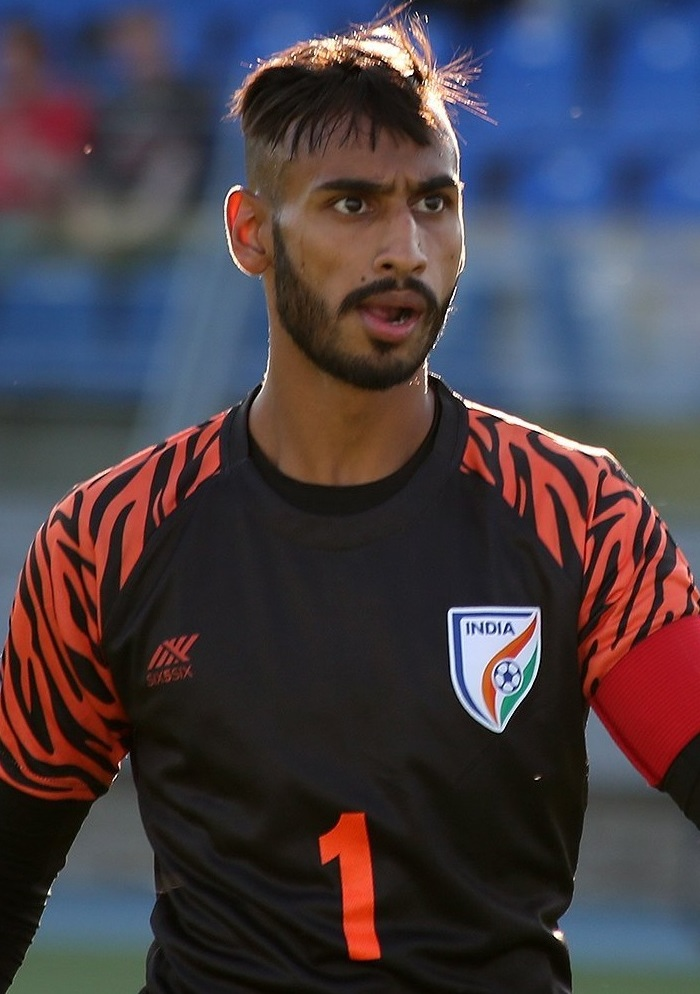
- Gill with India U20 in 2019

Personal information
- Full name: Prabhsukhan Singh Gill
- Date of birth: 2 January 2001 (age 25)
- Place of birth: Ludhiana, Punjab, India
- Height: 1.83 m (6 ft 0 in)
- Position: Goalkeeper

Team information
- Current team: East Bengal
- Number: 13

Youth career
- 2014–2016: Chandigarh Football Academy
- 2016–2017: AIFF Elite Academy

Senior career*
Years	Team	Apps	(Gls)
2017–2019	Indian Arrows	30	(0)
2019–2020	Bengaluru	1	(0)
2020–2023	Kerala Blasters	39	(0)
2023–	East Bengal	84	(0)

International career^{‡}
2016–2017	India U17	7	(0)
2017–2019	India U20	17	(0)
2019–2024	India U23	3	(0)
2026–	India	1	(0)
- * Club domestic league appearances and goals as of 23:44, 23 March 2026 (UTC) ‡ National team caps and goals as of 22:00, 3 October 2026 (UTC)

Prabhsukhan Singh Gill (Punjabi: ਪ੍ਰਭਸੁਖਨ ਸਿੰਘ ਗਿੱਲ; born 2 January 2001) is an Indian professional footballer who plays as a goalkeeper for Indian Super League club East Bengal and the India national football team.

== Early life and career ==
Prabhsukhan Singh Gill was born to a Jat Sikh family in Ludhiana, Punjab, India on 2 January 2001. Gill began his career with the Chandigarh Football Academy after a recommendation to scouts by his brother, Gursimrat Singh Gill. He later joined the AIFF Elite Academy after he participated in a trial to be part of the India under-17 side which would take part in the FIFA U-17 World Cup.

== Club career ==
=== Indian Arrows ===
After the FIFA U-17 World Cup concluded, Gill was selected to be part of the Indian Arrows, a developmental side owned by the All India Football Federation which was to play in the I-League. He appeared on the bench in the Arrow's first match of the season on 29 November 2017 against Chennai City, being the back-up to Dheeraj Singh Moirangthem. On 2 January 2018, Gill's 17th birthday, he made his professional debut for the Indian Arrows against East Bengal due to Moirangthem leaving the club. He gave up two goals early in the match as Indian Arrows fell 2–0. Arrows Head Coach Luís Norton de Matos was impressed with Gill's performance saying "I think it is a new process for goalkeeper Gill who is 16 years old. He made a fantastic save in the second half. The team needs to protect the goalie."

=== Bengaluru FC ===
He was signed by Bengaluru in 2019. He made two appearances for the club which includes a match against Paro FC in the AFC Cup Qualifier.

=== Kerala Blasters ===
==== 2021–22 season: Debut season and ISL Golden Glove ====
On 9 September 2020, Kerala Blasters announced the signing of Gill on a two-year deal. During his first season with the club, Gill did not made any appearances in the Super League as he was used as a back-up keeper for Albino Gomes. He finally made his Blasters debut on 21 September 2021 against Delhi FC in the Durand Cup, which they lost 1–0. He made his league debut on 5 December in the 2–1 victory over Odisha FC, where he was substituted in for Albino Gomes, after Albino was contracted with an injury. Gill then became the first choice keeper for the Blasters as Albino was ruled out of action for an indefinite period of time. On 12 December, he started for the Blasters in ISL for the first time in the next match against SC East Bengal in a 1–1 draw. Gill kept his first clean-sheet on 19 December against the defending champions Mumbai City FC in a 0–3 victory. He kept a clean-sheet again on 22 December in the next match against rivals Chennaiyin FC, which they won 0–3, repeating the same feat of the previous matchday. Gill had his first clean-sheet of the year 2022 in their match against SC East Bengal on 14 February, which they won with a score of 1–0 at full-time. His performance in the month of February earned him the ISL's 'Emerging Player of the Month' award. Gill was awarded with the Golden Glove of the 2021–22 Indian Super League. In twenty matches played, he managed to keep seven clean sheets, made 47 saves and conceded 21 goals. This was the best goalkeeping performance by a Kerala Blasters goalkeeper in the last five years.

==== 2022–23 season: Contract extension ====
After a good individual season, Kerala Blasters announced that Gill had signed a two-year contract with the club till 2024. On 19 November, Gill kept his 9th clean sheet for the Blasters in a 1–0 away win against Hyderabad FC and surpassed Sandip Nandy to become the all-time highest clean-sheet holder for the club.

=== East Bengal ===
On 11 July 2023, East Bengal announced the signing of Gill for a reported transfer fee of ₹1.2 crore, the highest for an Indian goalkeeper, on a three-year deal. He went on to become the number one keeper for the club and helped the club win the 2024 Indian Super Cup title, followed by the 2025–26 Indian Super League title.

On 11 June 2026, Gill extended for two more years with East Bengal. Gill paid the club back immediately as he helped the club win the 2026 Durand Cup title.

== International career ==
While a member of the Chandigarh Football Academy, Gill had a trial with the India under-17 side which was to take part in the 2017 FIFA U-17 World Cup in India. The trial was successful and Gill joined the team and the AIFF Elite Academy. On 21 September 2017, Gill was announced to be part of the 21-man side that would participate in the FIFA U-17 World Cup. He would be the number 2 goalkeeper for the side, behind Dheeraj Singh Moirangthem, during the U-17 World Cup.

On 26 October 2017, after the FIFA U-17 World Cup, Gill was selected to be part of the India under-20 side for the 2018 AFC U-19 Championship qualifiers. On 6 August 2018, India U20 national team defeated the six time world champions Argentina under-20 by 2–1 where Gill's two saves during the fifty sixth and sixty first minutes was crucial in deciding the match.

In March 2022, Gill was called up for the senior national squad by coach Igor Štimac ahead of India's two friendly matches against Bahrain and Belarus.

== Personal life ==
His elder brother Gursimrat Singh Gill is also a professional footballer who also plays for East Bengal as a defender. Both the Gill brothers formerly played together for Bengaluru FC during the 2019–20 season.

== Career statistics ==
=== Club ===
As of 16 September 2025

Club	Season	League			Super Cup		Durand Cup		Others		AFC		Total	
Club	Season	Division	Apps	Goals	Apps	Goals	Apps	Goals	Apps	Goals	Apps	Goals	Apps	Goals
Indian Arrows	2017–18	I-League	12	0	1	0	0	0	–		–		13	0
Indian Arrows	2018–19	I-League	18	0	2	0	0	0	–		–		20	0
Indian Arrows	Indian Arrows total		30	0	3	0	0	0	0	0	0	0	33	0
Bengaluru	2019–20	Indian Super League	1	0	0	0	0	0	–		1 (Note: Appearance in the AFC Cup)	0	2	0
Kerala Blasters	2020–21	Indian Super League	0	0	0	0	0	0	–		–		0	0
Kerala Blasters	2021–22	Indian Super League	20	0	0	0	1	0	–		–		21	0
Kerala Blasters	2022–23	Indian Super League	19	0	0	0	0	0	–		–		19	0
Kerala Blasters	Kerala Blasters total		39	0	0	0	1	0	0	0	0	0	40	0
East Bengal	2023–24	Indian Super League	21	0	5	0	6	0	–		–		32	0
East Bengal	2024–25	Indian Super League	21	0	1	0	3	0	–		6 (Note: One appearance in the AFC Champions League Two and Five appearances in the AFC Challenge League.)	0	31	0
East Bengal	2025–26	Indian Super League	13	0	4	0	4	0	2 (Note: Appearances in the IFA Shield.)	0	–		23	0
East Bengal	2026–27	Indian Super League	0	0	0	0	3	0	–		2 (Note: Appearances in the AFC Champions League Two.)	0	5	0
East Bengal	East Bengal total		55	0	10	0	16	0	2	0	8	0	91	0
Career total			125	0	13	0	17	0	2	0	9	0	166	0

=== International ===
As of 3 October 2026

National team	Year	Apps	Goals
India	2026	1	0
Total		1	0

== Honours ==
Kerala Blasters

- Indian Super League runner up: 2021–22

East Bengal FC

- ISL Cup: 2025-26
- Super Cup: 2024
- Durand Cup : 2026

Individual

- Indian Super League Golden Glove: 2021–22
