= David Grande =

Spanish footballer

Personal information
- Full name: Francisco David Grande Serrano
- Date of birth: 8 February 1991 (age 35)
- Place of birth: Madrid, Spain
- Height: 1.83 m (6 ft 0 in)
- Position: Forward

Team information
- Current team: Mensajero

Youth career
- Yunquera
- 2007–2009: Coslada
- 2009–2010: Villanueva de la Torre

Senior career*
Years	Team	Apps	(Gls)
2010–2011	Marchamalo	37	(12)
2011	Fuenlabrada	9	(0)
2011–2012	Illescas	20	(1)
2012–2013	Albacete B	33	(19)
2013	Albacete	2	(0)
2013–2014	Getafe B	21	(4)
2014–2015	Algeciras	15	(3)
2015	Villarubia	19	(5)
2015–2016	Alzira	31	(20)
2016–2017	Lealtad	37	(16)
2017–2018	Granada B	34	(7)
2018–2019	Ponferradina	13	(0)
2019	Málaga B	16	(5)
2019–2020	Unionistas	18	(9)
2020–2021	Jamshedpur	14	(3)
2021–2022	Calahorra	6	(0)
2022	Xerez DFC	18	(3)
2022–2023	Cacereño	34	(2)
2023	Marino de Luanco	18	(5)
2024	Compostela	14	(2)
2024	Kannur Warriors		
2024–2025	Costa d'Amalfi	0	(0)
2025	Badajoz	11	(0)
2025–	Mensajero	2	(1)
- * Club domestic league appearances and goals as of 13 September 2025

Francisco David Grande Serrano (born 8 February 1991) is a Spanish professional footballer who plays as a forward for Tercera Federación club Mensajero.
