= Dheeraj Singh Moirangthem =

Indian footballer (born 2000)

Dheeraj Singh
Personal information
- Full name: Dheeraj Singh Moirangthem
- Date of birth: 4 July 2000 (age 26)
- Place of birth: Moirang, Manipur, India
- Height: 1.81 m (5 ft 11 1/2 in)
- Position: Goalkeeper

Team information
- Current team: Diamond Harbour
- Number: 1

Youth career
- AIFF Elite Academy

Senior career*
Years	Team	Apps	(Gls)
2017	Indian Arrows	6	(0)
2018–2019	Kerala Blasters	13	(0)
2019–2020	ATK	1	(0)
2020–2021	ATK Mohun Bagan	0	(0)
2021–2024	Goa	53	(0)
2024–2025	Mohun Bagan SG	1	(0)
2025–	Diamond Harbour	12	(0)

International career^{‡}
2015–2017	India U17	18	(0)
2019–	India U23	6	(0)
Medal record
Representing India
SAFF Championship
Winner	2021 Maldives
- * Club domestic league appearances and goals as of 8 March 2025 (UTC) ‡ National team caps and goals as of 30 October 2021

Dheeraj Singh Moirangthem (Meitei: Moirangthem Dheeraj Singh, born 4 July 2000) is an Indian professional footballer who plays as a goalkeeper for Diamond Harbour.

== Club career ==
=== Early life and career ===
Born in Manipur, Dheeraj was part of the AIFF Elite Academy batch that was preparing for the 2017 FIFA U-17 World Cup to be hosted in India. After the tournament, Singh was selected to play for the Indian Arrows, an All India Football Federation-owned team that would consist of India under-20 players to give them playing time.

He made his professional debut for the side in the Arrow's first match of the season against Chennai City. He started and kept the clean sheet as Indian Arrows won 3–0. On 31 December 2017 he ended his contract with the AIFF to attend trials in Europe, beginning with Motherwell in the Scottish Premiership.

=== Kerala Blasters ===
Dheeraj represented Kerala Blasters in the 2018–19 Indian Super League. He was the first choice goalkeeper for the club. Dheeraj played his first match for the club on 29 September 2018 in the opening fixture of the 2018-19 Indian Super League season against ATK which ended 0–2 to the Blasters.

He played 13 league matches and one Super Cup match with the club. He pulled off some miraculous saves earning praises from different managers. His stunning performance in the season for Blasters earned him place in the India U23 National Team.

=== ATK ===
After an impressive season for Kerala Blasters, Dheeraj signed for Indian Super League side ATK for the 2019–20 season. He played just one match for ATK throughout the campaign as he was charted on the lineup on 22 February 2020 for the match against Bengaluru FC which ended in 2–2 draw. He has also signed a football sponsorship deal with PUMA.

=== Mohun Bagan ===
In 2020 before the start of the 2020–21 ISL season, it was announced that Dheeraj has signed for the football division of Mohun Bagan A.C. after KGSPL, the company that owned his former club ATK, took an 80% stake in the football division of Mohun Bagan and renamed it as ATK Mohun Bagan alongside dissolving its own club. But he made no appearance in that stint and left the club in January 2021.

=== Goa ===
==== 2020-21: Champions League Debut ====
On 15 January 2021, it was announced that Dheeraj has signed a three-year deal with Goa. He made his debut for Goa on 29 January against East Bengal in a 1–1 draw where he saved a penalty from Anthony Pilkington. He made nine appearances and kept his first clean-sheet in the last league game against Hyderabad FC in a goalless draw.

He played in both legs of the semi-final against Mumbai City FC the first leg ended in a 2–2 draw and the second ended in a goalless draw. Singh was substituted before the shootout for Naveen Kumar as Goa lost 6–5 on penalties. He managed to keep two cleansheets in nine appearances in his first season at Goa.

He was named in AFC Champions League team of matchday for his good performances, against Al-Rayyan on 14 April 2021, where he kept a cleansheet in a 0–0 draw. He again kept a cleansheet in a match against Al Wahda on 17 April in a 0–0 draw. Dheeraj won the man of the match award in a match against Persepolis on 20 April where although his side lost 2–1 but he saved a penalty from Hossein Kanaani. He emerged as the best goalkeeper in the group league round of the AFC Champions League even though his side failed to advance to the knockouts in its maiden appearance.

He made a whopping 26 saves in five matches to top the goalkeeping chart of the West Zone group league stage. "Dheeraj Singh certainly made a name for himself on his continental debut, pulling off a tournament-leading 26 saves in just five games, among them a number of memorable efforts that earned high praise from impressed observers," the AFC said on its website. On 26 November 2021, he was named in the AFC Champions League team of the season, the first Indian player to achieve so.

==== 2021-22: Durand Cup Victory ====
He made two appearances in Goa's 2021 Durand Cup winning campaign. In 2021–22 ISL season, he made fifteen appearances but his sole clean sheet came in a 5–0 victory over Chennaiyin FC with Goa finishing ninth in the league.

==== 2022-23 ====
After not playing a single game at 2022 Durand Cup, he started the season in the first match of 2022–23 ISL in a 2–1 win over East Bengal. He suffered a head injury in the next game against Chennaiyin FC and had to be taken off on the verge of an hour in a 2–0 win and stayed on bench in the next game. He made nineteen appearances and kept four cleansheets as Goa finished seventh in the league failing to qualify for playoffs. He stayed on bench for 2023 Indian Super Cup where Goa got knocked out in group stage.

=== Second stint with Mohun Bagan ===
He returns to Mohun Bagan for a second stint with club in the summer before the 2024–25 season.

== International career ==
=== India U17 ===
Dheeraj represented the India U17 side that participated in the 2017 FIFA U-17 World Cup which was hosted in India. He was the first choice goalkeeper and played all three group matches that India had. Even though he couldn't keep a clean sheet in any of the World Cup games, he was highly praised by fans and various managers for his technique and skills.

=== India U23 ===
Even though he could earn a place in the India National U-23 team. Dheeraj was again the first choice goalkeeper for India U23 for the 2020 AFC U-23 Championship qualifiers. He earned his spot in the team after a brilliant season with the Kerala Blasters in the 2018-19 ISL Season. He made his debut against Qatar U23 in an international friendly preparatory match for the 2019 AFC U23 Championship Qualifiers.

== Career statistics ==
=== Club ===
As of 10 August 2023

Club	Season	League			Cup		AFC		Total	
Club	Season	Division	Apps	Goals	Apps	Goals	Apps	Goals	Apps	Goals
Indian Arrows	2017–18	I-League	6	0	0	0	–		6	0
Kerala Blasters	2018–19	Indian Super League	13	0	1 (Note: Appearances in the Super Cup)	0	–		14	0
ATK	2019–20	Indian Super League	1	0	0	0	–		1	0
ATK Mohun Bagan	2020–21	Indian Super League	0	0	0	0	–		0	0
Goa	2020–21	Indian Super League	9	0	0	0	5 (Note: Appearances in the AFC Champions League)	0	14	0
Goa	2021–22	Indian Super League	15	0	2 (Note: Appearances in the Durand Cup)	0	–		17	0
Goa	2022–23	Indian Super League	19	0	0	0	–		19	0
Goa	2023–24	Indian Super League	7	0	9	0	–		16	0
Career total			63	0	3	0	5	0	87	0

== Honours ==
India

- SAFF Championship: 2021

Individual

- AFC Champions League Team of the Tournament: 2021
