= Abhijit Sarkar (footballer) =

Indian footballer (born 2000)

Personal information
- Date of birth: 5 January 2000 (age 26)
- Place of birth: Bandel, West Bengal, India
- Height: 1.74 m (5 ft 8 1/2 in)
- Position: Attacking midfielder

Team information
- Current team: Mohammedan
- Number: 13

Youth career
- –2017: AIFF Elite Academy

Senior career*
Years	Team	Apps	(Gls)
2017–2018	Indian Arrows	15	(4)
2018–2021	Chennaiyin	1	(0)
2018–2019	→ Indian Arrows (loan)	6	(1)
2019–2020	→ East Bengal (loan)	6	(0)
2021–2022	Sudeva Delhi	15	(2)
2022–2023	Real Kashmir	0	(0)
2023–	Mohammedan	0	(0)

International career^{‡}
2015–2017	India U17	21	(0)
- * Club domestic league appearances and goals as of 16:14, 4 May 2022 (UTC) ‡ National team caps and goals as of 29 November 2017

Abhijit Sarkar (born 5 January 2000) is an Indian professional footballer who plays as an attacking midfielder for Mohammedan in the I-League. He has represented India at various youth levels, and also played for them in the 2017 FIFA U-17 World Cup.

== Career ==
Born in Bandel, West Bengal, Sarkar was part of the AIFF Elite Academy batch that was preparing for the 2017 FIFA U-17 World Cup to be hosted in India. After the tournament, Sarkar was selected to play for Indian Arrows, an All India Football Federation-owned team that would consist of India under-20 players to give them playing time. He made his professional debut for the side in the Arrows' first match of the season against Chennai City. He came on as a 90th-minute substitute for Jeakson Singh Thounaojam as Indian Arrows won 3–0. On 10 February 2018 Sarkar came on as a substitute and scored twice in injury time to lift the Arrows to a 2–1 victory over Churchill Brothers. After an impressive season, he signed for Indian Super League club Chennaiyin FC for the 2018–19 season. He was loaned back to the Indian Arrows, and played six games in the 2018–19 season, scoring 1 goal. For the 2019–20 season, he was loaned to East Bengal.

== International ==
Sarkar represented the India under-17 side which participated in the 2017 FIFA U-17 World Cup which was hosted in India.

== Career statistics ==
=== Club ===
As of 6 April 2023

Club	Season	League			Cup		Other		AFC		Total	
Club	Season	Division	Apps	Goals	Apps	Goals	Apps	Goals	Apps	Goals	Apps	Goals
Indian Arrows	2017–18	I-League	15	4	0	0	—		—		15	4
Chennaiyin	2019–20	Indian Super League	0	0	0	0	—		—		0	0
Chennaiyin	2020–21	Indian Super League	1	0	0	0	—		—		1	0
Chennaiyin	Chennaiyin total		1	0	0	0	0	0	0	0	1	0
Indian Arrows (loan)	2018–19	I-League	6	1	0	0	—		—		6	1
East Bengal (loan)	2019–20	I-League	6	0	1 (Note: Appearance(s) in Durand Cup)	0	1 (Note: Appearance(s) in Calcutta Football League)	0	—		8	0
Sudeva Delhi	2021–22	I-League	15	2	0	0	—		—		15	2
Real Kashmir	2022–23	I-League	0	0	1 (Note: Appearance(s) in Super Cup)	0	—		—		1	0
Career total			43	7	2	0	1	0	0	0	46	7
