= Mobashir Rahman =

Indian footballer

Personal information
- Full name: Mohammad Mobashir Rahman
- Date of birth: 12 March 1998 (age 28)
- Place of birth: Jamshedpur, Jharkhand
- Height: 1.72 m (5 ft 8 in)
- Position: Midfielder

Team information
- Current team: Jamshedpur
- Number: 15

Youth career
- 2010–2014: Chandigarh Football Academy
- 2014–2018: Tata Football Academy

Senior career*
Years	Team	Apps	(Gls)
2018–2022	Jamshedpur	53	(1)
2022–2024	East Bengal	14	(0)
2024	→ Chennaiyin (loan)	6	(0)
2024—	Jamshedpur	0	(0)
- * Club domestic league appearances and goals as of 18:30, 14 April 2024 (UTC)

Mohammad Mobashir Rahman (born 12 March 1998) is an Indian professional footballer who plays as a midfielder for Indian Super League club Jamshedpur.

== Career ==
Mobashir was born in Jamshedpur, Jharkhand. His father, Mohammad Shafique, played football for Bihar. In 2008, Mobashir was offered a chance to train at the Chandigarh Football Academy but had to reject it after his parents were not sure whether to let Mobashir focus on football. Two years later, he convinced his parents to let him play at the Chandigarh Football Academy. He spent four years at the academy before being selected to join the Tata Football Academy in 2014. He graduated from the academy in July 2018.

=== Jamshedpur ===
On 20 September 2018, after training with Jamshedpur during their pre-season, Mobashir, along with former Tata Football Academy graduates Gourav Mukhi and Vishal Das, was signed to a professional contract. He made his debut for the club on 2 October 2018 against Mumbai City. He came on as a 76th–minute substitute for Mario Arqués as Jamshedpur won 2–0.

== Career statistics ==
=== Club ===
As of 14 April 2022

Club	Season	League			Cup		AFC		Total	
Club	Season	Division	Apps	Goals	Apps	Goals	Apps	Goals	Apps	Goals
Jamshedpur	2018–19	Indian Super League	11	0	1 (Note: Appearance(s) in Super Cup)	0	—		12	0
Jamshedpur	2019–20	Indian Super League	10	0	0	0	—		10	0
Jamshedpur	2020–21	Indian Super League	19	1	0	0	—		19	1
Jamshedpur	2021–22	Indian Super League	13	0	0	0	—		13	0
East Bengal	2022–23	Indian Super League	13	0	4	1	—		0	0
Career total			66	1	5	1	0	0	71	2
