= Lalengmawia Ralte =

Indian footballer (born 2000)

Apuia Ralte
Personal information
- Full name: Lalengmawia Ralte
- Date of birth: 17 October 2000 (age 26)
- Place of birth: Aizawl, Mizoram, India
- Height: 1.78 m (5 ft 10 in)
- Position: Defensive midfielder

Team information
- Current team: Mohun Bagan
- Number: 45

Youth career
- 2016–2017: AIFF Elite Academy

Senior career*
Years	Team	Apps	(Gls)
2017–2019	Indian Arrows	13	(1)
2019–2021	NorthEast United	32	(1)
2021–2024	Mumbai City	59	(4)
2024–	Mohun Bagan	31	(2)

International career^{‡}
2016–2017	India U16	5	(0)
2017–2021	India U17	8	(0)
2021–2022	India U23	6	(0)
2021–	India	31	(0)
Medal record
Men's football
Representing India
SAFF Championship
Winner	2021 Maldives
- * Club domestic league appearances and goals as of 16:30, 17 May 2026 (UTC) ‡ National team caps and goals as of 22:00, 6 October 2026 (UTC)

Lalengmawia Ralte (born 17 October 2000), commonly known by the nickname Apuia, is an Indian professional footballer who plays as a midfielder for Indian Super League club Mohun Bagan and the India national team.

== Club career ==
=== Youth career ===
Apuia started playing football at the age of 6. His first big break arrived when he was selected to play in his school team for the U14 Subroto Cup, an international inter-school football tournament that is held annually in New Delhi, India. He spent a couple of years at the Regional Sports Training Centre football academy in Kolasib, Mizoram and trained under HC Zarzoliana.

In January 2016, he went to the trials for the 2017 Under-17 World Cup squad that took place in Mizoram and thus joined the AIFF Elite Academy, in Goa.

=== Indian Arrows ===
==== 2017–18 season ====
On 29 November 2017, Apuia was selected to play for the Indian Arrows, an All India Football Federation owned team that would consist of India under-20 players to give them playing time.

He made his professional debut for the side on 23 February 2018, against his hometown club Aizawl. He started and played the full match as Indian Arrows lost 3–0. In his debut season, Apuia made three appearances, including one in the 2018 Indian Super Cup for the Arrows.

==== 2018–19 season ====
On 13 January 2019, Apuia scored his first goal for the development club against Shillong Lajong, in a dominant 3–0 win. He made some space for himself and pulled the trigger from just inside the box to see the ball nestle into the top corner.

He featured in 11 matches of the 2018–19 I-League campaign and also once in the 2019 Indian Super Cup as he played well whenever he was called upon and contributed to the ideas head coach Pinto had in his mind.

=== NorthEast United ===
==== 2019–20 season: Debut in the ISL ====
On 23 May 2019, Indian Super League club NorthEast United secured the services of Apuia for the 2019–20 season. On 18 December 2019, he made his professional debut for the club in the 9th matchweek of the 2019–20 Indian Super League campaign against Bengaluru, in a 2–0 loss. This started of him being more involved in the starting XI following this match.

The 2019–20 Indian Super League season ended in disappointment as they finished second last in the table. Lalengmawia, though, was one of the few bright spots in the team's season. He controlled the midfield, pulling the strings and managed the game like a seasoned pro. He impressed many with his passing accuracy, creativity and endurance in midfield.

==== 2020–21 season: The breakout season ====
On 5 August 2020, NorthEast United extended contracts of 5 Indian players which included Apuia for the upcoming season. On 30 November 2020, he captained NorthEast United for the first time in their 1–1 away draw against Goa, which made him the youngest player to lead a side in the Indian Super League, at an age of 20 years and 44 days.

It was the 2020–21 Indian Super League season in which Apuia had a breakout season with the Highlanders. They finished third in the league stages, qualifying for the playoffs for only the second time in their history. On 26 February 2021, he finally managed to get his first professional goal for the club in the last game of the league stages against Kerala Blasters, in a 2–0 win.

On 13 March 2021, his wonderful displays in the season won him the Indian Super League Emerging Player of the League. He also won the FPAI Young Player of the Year, on 31 March 2021.

=== Mumbai City ===
==== 2021–22 season ====
On 13 August 2021, Apuia joined Mumbai City on a five-year deal for a record transfer fee of INR 2 crores ($280,000). He was part of the team as they finished the season on fifth place and failed to qualify for the playoffs. Ahead of the 2022 AFC Champions League kick-off, the club went to Abu Dhabi for training and defeated Emirati giants Al Ain 2–1 in a friendly match, in which Apuia scored a goal.

Apuia started all six of Mumbai's 2022 AFC Champions League group stage matches, as the club made history by being the first Indian side to win an AFC Champions League match, beating Iraqi club Al-Quwa Al-Jawiya (also known as Air Force Club) 2–1, thanks to a winning goal from Rahul Bheke. Mumbai went on to draw with Abu Dhabi club Al Jazira 0–0, and beat Air Force Club again, this time with a 1–0 scoreline and Diego Mauricio scoring the winning goal from the penalty spot. This meant Mumbai bowed out of the tournament as the second-placed team in Group B, with seven points and two wins.

==== 2022–23 season ====
On 3 September 2022, Mumbai City officially announced that Apuia went to Belgium for a two-week training stint with First Division B side Lommel. Due to this stint, Apuia missed most of the club's matches in the 2022 Durand Cup, but returned in time to play and score in the final, where Mumbai narrowly lost 2–1 to Bengaluru FC.

He made his first ISL appearance of the season away against Hyderabad FC, in a thrilling 3–3 draw on 9 October 2022. He scored his first ISL goal for the club on 17 November 2022 against Bengaluru FC at home, scoring the second goal in an eventual 4–0 win for the Islanders, picking up the ball in the area and calmly slotting the ball past Gurpreet Singh Sandhu.

On 16 December 2023, he scored his first-ever brace, netting in the 26th and 59th minute away against East Bengal FC. He remained a key part of the Islanders' season, as they made history in the league with a stunning 18-match unbeaten run, which is the longest unbeaten start for any team in the history of the ISL. It is also the longest unbeaten streak in ISL history.

Mumbai lifted the 2022-23 League Shield, the trophy for the team finishing on top of the table. However, Mumbai were knocked out of the playoffs in the semi-finals, following a loss on penalties against Bengaluru FC.

==== 2023–24 season ====
Apuia began the 2023–24 season with a 2–0 loss at home against F.C. Nassaji Mazandaran on 18 September 2023 in the 2023–24 AFC Champions League group stage. His first ISL appearance of the season came in a 1–2 away win against NorthEast United FC on 24 September 2023. His first goal of the season came against Kerala Blasters FC, the winning goal in a 2–1 win for the Islanders at home, where he outjumped Blasters goalkeeper Sachin Suresh to score a brilliant header.

As he did in the 2022 AFC Champions League, Apuia featured in every game Mumbai played in the 2023–24 AFC Champions League. However, the campaign wasn't as fruitful for The Islanders, as they were knocked out in the group stage of the competition with zero points, with only one goal scored throughout the six matches they played.

=== Mohun Bagan Super Giant ===
On June 25, 2024, Mohun Bagan announced the signing of Apuia on a five-year deal by triggering his release clause which is believed to be around ₹1.6 crore.

== International career ==
On 2 March 2021, Lalengmawia got selected for the 35-man probable national squad camp ahead of India national team's friendlies against Oman and UAE. On 25 March 2021, he made his international debut for India against Oman when he came on as half-time substitute for Rowllin Borges, which ended in a 1–1 draw.

During the SAFF Championship held in October 2021, Sunil Chhetri, who was awarded the man of the match in the game against Maldives, handed over the award to Apuia.

== Style of play ==
Apuia is noted for his tactful and intelligent playing, as well as his passing accuracy, which in the 2020-21 Indian Super League season reached 74.5%. He is regarded as a reliable defensive player who maintains composure under pressure, earning a reputation as a "metronome" on the playing field.

== Personal life ==
Apuia was born in Aizawl, Mizoram. His father works as a butcher. His parents had always supported his passion for football and were there for him throughout. In 2015, his parents asked him to skip the trials for the 2017 Under-17 World Cup squad that took place in Mizoram, and rather focus on his Class X board exams. He did appear in the next round of trials held in Mizoram, in January 2016.

His favourite clubs are Barcelona and his hometown club Aizawl. He idolises Argentinian forward Lionel Messi, and current Real Kashmir midfielder Lalrindika Ralte is his favourite Indian player. He also revealed that he chose 45 as his jersey number because of Italian forward Mario Balotelli.

== Career statistics ==
=== Club ===
As of 23 August 2026

Club	Season	League			National Cup		League Cup		AFC		Other(s)		Total	
Club	Season	Division	Apps	Goals	Apps	Goals	Apps	Goals	Apps	Goals	Apps	Goals	Apps	Goals
Indian Arrows	2017–18	I-League	2	0	1 (Note: Appearance(s) in Super Cup)	0	—		—		—		3	0
Indian Arrows	2018–19	I-League	11	1	1	0	—		—		—		12	1
Indian Arrows	Total		13	1	2	0	0	0	0	0	0	0	15	1
NorthEast United	2019–20	Indian Super League	10	0	0	0	—		—		—		10	0
NorthEast United	2020–21	Indian Super League	22	1	0	0	—		—		—		22	1
NorthEast United	Total		32	1	0	0	0	0	0	0	0	0	32	1
Mumbai City	2021–22	Indian Super League	20	0	—		—		6 (Note: Appearance(s) in AFC Champions League)	0	—		26	0
Mumbai City	2022–23	Indian Super League	17	3	3	1	3 (Note: Appearance(s) in Durand Cup)	1	1 (Note: Appearance in playoff for AFC Champions League)	0	—		24	5
Mumbai City	2023–24	Indian Super League	22	1	—		4	0	6 (Note: Appearance(s) in AFC Champions League)	0	—		32	1
Mumbai City	Total		59	4	3	1	7	1	13	0	0	0	82	6
Mohun Bagan	2024–25	Indian Super League	22	1	0	0	4	0	1 (Note: Appearance(s) in AFC Champions League Two)	0	—		27	1
Mohun Bagan	2025–26	Indian Super League	9	0	3	0	3	0	1	0	2 (Note: Appearance(s) in IFA Shield)	1	18	1
Mohun Bagan	2026–27	Indian Super League	0	0	0	0	4	0	—		0	0	4	0
Mohun Bagan	Total		31	1	3	0	11	0	2	0	2	1	49	2
Career total			135	7	8	1	18	1	15	0	2	1	178	10

=== International ===
As of 6 October 2026

National team	Year	Apps	Goals
India	2021	10	0
India	2023	3	0
India	2024	9	0
India	2025	5	0
India	2026	4	0
Total		31	0

== Honours ==
India

- SAFF Championship: 2021
- Intercontinental Cup: 2023

Mumbai City

- Indian Super League Shield: 2022–23
- Indian Super League Cup: 2023–24

Mohun Bagan

- Indian Super League Shield: 2024–25
- Indian Super League Cup: 2024–25
- IFA Shield: 2025, 2026
- Calcutta Football League: 2026

Individual

- Indian Super League: Hero of the Month (February 2021)
- Indian Super League: ISL Emerging Player of the Season (2020–21)
- FPAI Indian Football awards: Young Player of the Year (2020–21)
