= Ricky Lallawmawma =

Indian footballer

Personal information
- Date of birth: 9 September 1991 (age 35)
- Place of birth: Mizoram, India
- Height: 1.70 m (5 ft 7 in)
- Position: Left back

Team information
- Current team: Jamshedpur
- Number: 6

Senior career*
Years	Team	Apps	(Gls)
2011–2014	Aizawl	48	(3)
2014–2015	Chanmari	10	(0)
2015	Zo United	0	(0)
2015–2016	Aizawl	15	(0)
2016–2017	DSK Shivajians	16	(0)
2017–2018	Mohun Bagan	14	(0)
2018–2020	ATK	17	(0)
2020–	Jamshedpur	70	(0)
- * Club domestic league appearances and goals as of 17:00, 9 April 2024 (UTC)

Ricky Lallawmawma (born 9 September 1991) is an Indian professional footballer who last played as defender for Indian Super League club Jamshedpur.

== Career ==
Born in Mizoram, Lallawmawma started his career with Aizawl, who he later captained. He moved to local rivals Chanmari in 2014. He then moved again to Zo United of the Mizoram Premier League in 2015. He then moved back to Aizawl after they gained promotion to the I-League.

Lallawmawma made his professional debut for Aizawl in the I-League on 9 January 2016 against the reigning champions, Mohun Bagan. He came on in the 37th minute as Aizawl lost 3–1.

On 23 December 2016 he signed for DSK Shivajians for I-League 2017.

On 17 August 2017 he signed for Mohun Bagan for I-League 2018.

Ricky signed for ATK in the 2018–19 season putting on some stellar performances on his debut ISL season, registering 17 appearances for the Kolkata based club.

After failing to establish his name in the Starting 11 for ATK in their title winning 2019-20 campaign, he joined Jamshedpur ahead of the 2020–21 season where he made the left back position his own.

== Honours ==
Jamshedpur

- Indian Super League Premiers: 2021-22
