= Amarjit Singh Kiyam =

Indian footballer (born 2001)

Amarjit Singh
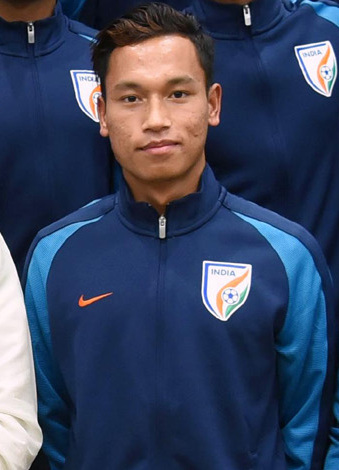
- Amarjit Singh with India U17 in 2017

Personal information
- Full name: Amarjit Singh Kiyam
- Date of birth: 6 January 2001 (age 25)
- Place of birth: Thoubal, Manipur, India
- Height: 1.71 m (5 ft 7 in)
- Position: Central midfielder

Team information
- Current team: Samaleswari

Youth career
- 2015–2017: AIFF Elite Academy

Senior career*
Years	Team	Apps	(Gls)
2017–2018	Indian Arrows	16	(1)
2018–2021	Jamshedpur	15	(0)
2018–2019	→ Indian Arrows (loan)	20	(3)
2021–2023	Goa	2	(0)
2021–2023	→ East Bengal (loan)	17	(0)
2023	→ East Bengal B (loan)	4	(1)
2023–2024	Punjab	10	(0)
2024–2026	Mohammedan	21	(0)
2026–	Samaleswari		

International career^{‡}
2015–2018	India U17	33	(2)
2017–2019	India U20	4	(1)
2021–2023	India U23	7	(0)
2019	India	5	(0)
- * Club domestic league appearances and goals as of 21:31, 23 March 2026 (UTC) ‡ National team caps and goals as of 12:33, 28 September 2023 (UTC)

Amarjit Singh Kiyam (Meitei: Kiyam Amarjit Singh, born 6 January 2001) is an Indian professional footballer who plays as a central midfielder for Indian Super League club Samaleswari. He captained the India national under-17 team at the 2017 FIFA U-17 World Cup.

== Club career ==
Born in Thoubal, Manipur, Amarjit was part of the AIFF Elite Academy batch that was preparing for the 2017 FIFA U-17 World Cup to be hosted in India. He was the captain of the India U17 team that played in the 2017 FIFA U-17 World Cup. After the tournament, Amarjit was selected to play for the Indian Arrows, an All India Football Federation-owned team which competes in the I-League. He made his professional debut for the side in the Arrow's first match of the season against Chennai City. He started and played the whole match as Indian Arrows won 3–0.

== International career ==
Amarjit represented the India under-17 side which participated in the 2017 FIFA U-17 World Cup which was hosted in India. He was the captain of the Indian team in U-17 World Cup.

Amarjit represented India national team in the 2019 King's Cup on June 5 in the opening match against Curaçao as he came as a substitute for Pronay Halder. He became the first player to born after 2000 to play in the senior team. He was named in the squad for the 2022 FIFA World Cup Qualifier games against Oman and Qatar in September 2019, but had to leave the squad due to an arm injury.

== Personal life ==
His cousin Jeakson Singh is also a professional footballer currently playing for East Bengal. Both of them represented the India national under-17 team in the 2017 FIFA U-17 World Cup India where Jeakson scored India's first ever goal in a FIFA tournament. His cousin sister, Kritina Devi Thounaojam also represented India in youth teams. He has made history as a youngster, moving from the India U-17 team to the senior squad in only 2 years.

== Style of play ==
He has been praised for his passing ability and excellence on the ball.

== Career statistics ==
=== Club ===
As of 6 April 2024

Club	Season	League			Cup		Others		AFC		Total	
Club	Season	Division	Apps	Goals	Apps	Goals	Apps	Goals	Apps	Goals	Apps	Goals
Indian Arrows	2017–18	I-League	16	1	1 (Note: Appearance(s) in Super Cup)	0	—		—		17	1
Jamshedpur	2019–20	Indian Super League	8	0	0	0	—		—		8	0
Jamshedpur	2020–21	Indian Super League	7	0	0	0	—		—		7	0
Jamshedpur	Jamshedpur total		15	0	0	0	0	0	0	0	15	0
Indian Arrows (loan)	2018–19	I-League	20	3	2	2	—		—		22	5
Goa	2020–21	Indian Super League	2	0	0	0	—		4 (Note: Appearance(s) in AFC Champions League)	0	6	0
Goa	2023–24	Indian Super League	0	0	0	0	—		—		0	0
Goa	Goa total		2	0	0	0	0	0	4	0	6	0
East Bengal (loan)	2021–22	Indian Super League	16	0	0	0	—		—		16	0
East Bengal (loan)	2022–23	Indian Super League	1	0	4 (Note: Appearance(s) in Durand Cup)	0	3 (Note: Appearance(s) in Calcutta Football League)	0	—		8	0
East Bengal (loan)	East Bengal total		17	0	4	0	3	0	4	0	24	0
East Bengal B (loan)	2022–23	I-League 2	4	1	0	0	—		—		4	1
Punjab	2023–24	Indian Super League	10	0	4	0	—		—		14	0
Mohammedan	2024–25	Indian Super League	0	0	0	0	—		—		0	0
Career total			84	5	11	2	3	0	4	0	102	7

=== International ===
As of match played 16 July 2019

National team	Year	Apps	Goals
India	2019	5	0
Total		5	0

== Honours ==
East Bengal Reserves

- Madhyamgram MLA Cup: 2023

India

- King's Cup third place: 2019
