= Deepak Tangri =

Indian footballer (born 1999)

Personal information
- Full name: Deepak Tangri
- Date of birth: 1 February 1999 (age 27)
- Place of birth: Chandigarh, India
- Height: 1.78 m (5 ft 10 in)
- Positions: Defensive midfielder; centre-back

Team information
- Current team: Mohun Bagan
- Number: 22

Youth career
- 2009–2017: Mohun Bagan

Senior career*
Years	Team	Apps	(Gls)
2017–2019	Indian Arrows	13	(0)
2018–2021	Chennaiyin	22	(0)
2018–2019	→ Indian Arrows (loan)	16	(1)
2021–	Mohun Bagan	67	(2)

International career^{‡}
2017–2019	India U20	3	(1)
2021	India U23	3	(0)
2024–	India	5	(0)
- * Club domestic league appearances and goals as of 16:45, 23 June 2026 (UTC) ‡ National team caps and goals as of 9 October 2025 (UTC)

Deepak Tangri (born 1 February 1999) is an Indian professional footballer who plays as a defensive midfielder or centre-back for Indian Super League club Mohun Bagan and the India national team.

== Club career ==
Tangri started his football career with Mohun Bagan. In November 2017, it was announced that Tangri was selected to play for the Indian Arrows, an All India Football Federation owned team that would consist of India under-20 players to give them playing time. He made his professional debut for the side on 5 December 2017 against Minerva Punjab. He started but couldn't prevent the Indian Arrows from losing 2–0.

=== Mohun Bagan ===
On 29 June 2021, Deepak Tangri was signed by Mohun Bagan on a two-year contract.

== International career ==
At international level, Tangri had represented India at both U-19 and U-23 levels.

He received a surprise maiden call-up to the senior national team squad by Igor Štimac for 2023 AFC Asian Cup in Qatar. He made his debut for India on 13 January 2024 against Australia where he started in 2–0 defeat.

== Career statistics ==
=== Club ===
As of 19 April 2026

Club	Season	League			Cup		Continental		Durand Cup		Other(s)		Total	
Club	Season	Division	Apps	Goals	Apps	Goals	Apps	Goals	Apps	Goals	Apps	Goals	Apps	Goals
Indian Arrows	2017–18	I-League	13	0	1 (Note: Appearance(s) in Super Cup)	0	—		—		—		14	0
Indian Arrows (loan)	2018–19	I-League	16	1	2	0	—		—		—		18	1
Indian Arrows (loan)	Indian Arrows total		29	1	3	0	0	0	0	0	0	0	32	1
Chennaiyin	2019–20	Indian Super League	5	0	—		—		—		—		5	0
Chennaiyin	2020–21	Indian Super League	17	0	—		—		—		—		17	0
Chennaiyin	Chennaiyin total		22	0	0	0	0	0	0	0	0	0	22	0
Mohun Bagan	2023	Calcutta Football League	1	0	–								1	0
Mohun Bagan	Total		1	0	–								1	0
Mohun Bagan	2021–22	Indian Super League	18	0	—		3 (Note: 2021 AFC Cup)	0	—				21	0
Mohun Bagan	2022–23	Indian Super League	11	0	—		5 (Note: 2022 AFC Cup)	0	3 (Note: Appearances in Durand Cup)	0	—		19	0
Mohun Bagan	2023–24	Indian Super League	18	2	—		2 (Note: 2023 AFC Cup)	0	—				20	2
Mohun Bagan	2024–25	Indian Super League	19	0	2	0	1 (Note: Appearance(s) in ACL Two)	0	2	0	—		24	0
Mohun Bagan	2025–26	Indian Super League	6	0	3	0	1	0	4	0	1 (Note: Appearance(s) in IFA Shield)	0	15	0
Mohun Bagan	Mohun Bagan total		73	2	5	0	12	0	9	0	1	0	100	2
Career total			124	3	8	0	12	0	9	0	1	0	154	3

=== International ===
As of 9 October 2025

National team	Year	Apps	Goals
India	2024	4	0
India	2025	1	0
Total		5	0
