= Bambolim =

- Neighborhood
- Location in Goa, India Bambolim (India)
- Coordinates: 15.451240°N 73.852776°E
- Country: India
- State: Goa
- District: North Goa
- Elevation: 1 m (3.3 ft)

Population (2001)
  - Total: 5,319

Languages
  - Official: Konkani
- Time zone: UTC+5:30 (IST)
- Vehicle registration: GA
- Website: Goa.gov.in

Bambolim is a census town located in the southeastern part of the city of Panaji, the capital of the Indian state of Goa. It is completely located on the island of Tiswadi, one of the talukas in the state of Goa.

The only allopathic medical college in the state of Goa, Goa Medical College, is located here.

== Geography ==
Bambolim is located at 15.45°N 73.85°E. It has an average elevation of 1 metre (3 feet).

== Demographics ==
As of 2001 India census, Bambolim had a population of 5319. Males constitute 64% of the population and females 36%. Bambolim's literacy rate is 69% of the males and 31% of females. 10% of the population is under 6 years of age.

== Bambolim Beach ==
Bambolim beach is located about 7 km from Panaji.
