= Tilak Maidan =

Stadium in Goa, India

- Interactive map of Tilak Maidan
- Location: Vasco da Gama, Goa, India
- Coordinates: 15°24′2.07″N 73°48′54.41″E
- Owner: Sports Authority of Goa
- Capacity: 5,000
- Surface: Grass
- Field size: 100.0 M X 70.0 M

Tenants
- Churchill Brothers (I-League); Dempo; Salgaocar; Sporting Clube de Goa; Vasco SC (selected matches)

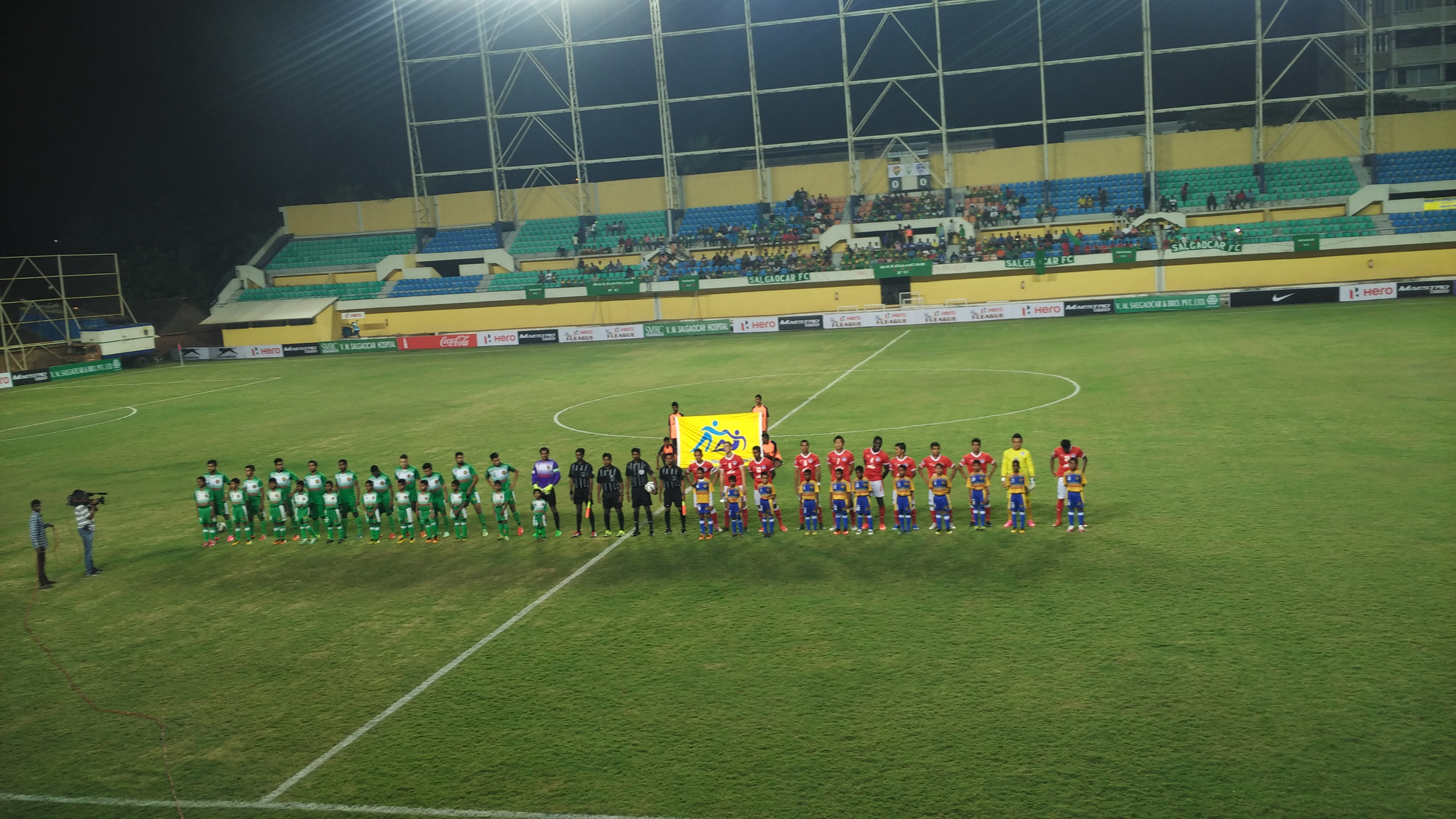
Starting line-up during Salgaocar FC vs Bengaluru FC match at Tilak Maidan Stadium

Tilak Maidan is a multi-purpose stadium located in Vasco da Gama, Goa, India. It is used mostly for football matches and regularly hosts I-League and Goa Professional League matches. It also hosted the Indian Super League matches from 2020 till 2022 due to COVID-19 pandemic. The goal stands on the stadium are referred to as Harbour End and City End.

== Overview ==
The venue has the capacity to accommodate 5,000 spectators. The Group stage of the football event during 2014 Lusofonia Games was held here. The stadium is maintained by the Sports Authority of Goa. It has been upgraded satisfactorily to ensure most FIFA standards are maintained. Facilities include player changing rooms and lounge, dope control rooms and a media centre. The Stadium is used by Churchill Brothers S.C., Dempo S.C., Salgaocar S.C., Sporting Clube de Goa and Vasco S.C. and Indian Arrows. The stadium was serving as one of the venues of the Indian Super League due to the COVID-19 pandemic in India.
