= Jeakson Singh Thounaojam =

Indian footballer (born 2001)

Jeakson Singh
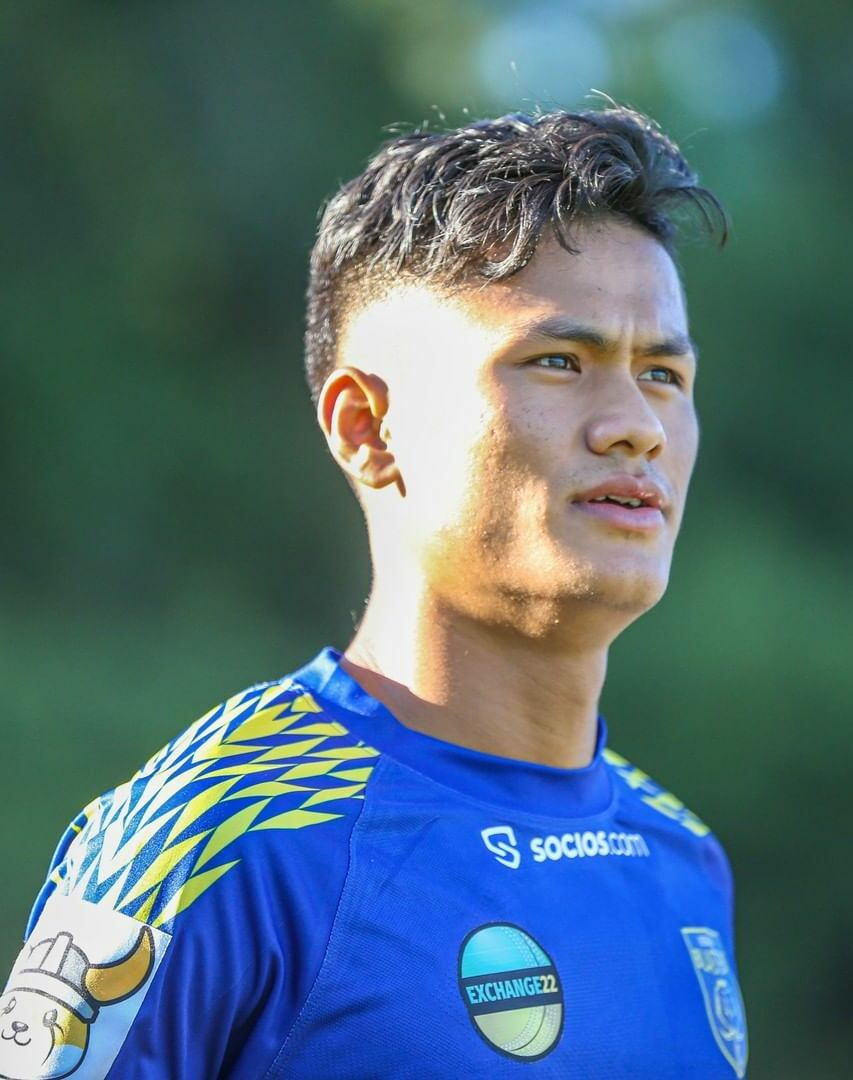
- Jeakson with Kerala Blasters FC in 2021

Personal information
- Full name: Jeakson Singh Thounaojam
- Date of birth: 21 June 2001 (age 25)
- Place of birth: Thoubal, Manipur
- Height: 1.87 m (6 ft 2 in)
- Position: Defensive midfielder

Team information
- Current team: East Bengal
- Number: 25

Youth career
- 2012–2016: Chandigarh Football Academy
- 2016–2017: Minerva Punjab

Senior career*
Years	Team	Apps	(Gls)
2017–2018	Minerva Punjab	0	(0)
2017–2018	→ Indian Arrows (loan)	8	(0)
2018–2019	Kerala Blasters B	5	(0)
2018–2019	→ Indian Arrows (loan)	1	(0)
2019–2024	Kerala Blasters	71	(2)
2024–	East Bengal	30	(3)

International career^{‡}
2017–2018	India U17	5	(1)
2018–2020	India U20	15	(0)
2019–	India U23	2	(0)
2021–	India	32	(0)
Medal record
Men's football
Representing India
SAFF Championship
Winner	2021 Maldives
Winner	2023 India
CAFA Nations Cup
Third place	2025 Tajikistan–Uzbekistan	Team
- * Club domestic league appearances and goals as of 13:30, 8 October 2023 (UTC) ‡ National team caps and goals as of 20:00, 5 June 2026 (UTC)

Jeakson Singh Thounaojam (born 21 June 2001) is an Indian professional footballer who plays as a defensive midfielder for Indian Super League club East Bengal and the India national team.

== Club career ==
=== Youth and early career: 2012–2018 ===
Born in Manipur, to a family that loved football, Jeakson's early introduction to the sport came from his father, who was a coach. He was eleven years old when he left his hometown in Thoubal district to travel all the way to Chandigarh to join the Chandigarh football academy known as CFA. After around five years at CFA, he later joined Minerva Punjab academy where he was the part of their youth team. He formed a crucial part of the club's academy team which would go on to win the AIFF U-15 & U-16 Youth League titles two consecutive years. After the FIFA U-17 World Cup, Jeakson was selected to play for the Indian Arrows, an All India Football Federation-owned team that would consist of India under-20 players to give them playing time, on loan from Minerva Punjab. He made his first-ever professional debut for the side in the Arrows' first match of the season against Chennai City. He started and played 90 minutes as Indian Arrows won 3–0.

=== Kerala Blasters ===
==== Kerala Blasters Reserves: 2018–2019 season ====
In October 2018 Kerala Blasters announced the signing of Jeakson. He was put on to the reserve side and made 5 appearances for the side in the I-League 2nd Division. After the season he was once again loaned to Indian Arrows to get some playing time.

==== Kerala Blasters: 2019–2020 season ====
He was promoted to the senior team by newly appointed Blasters coach Eelco Schattorie for the 2019–20 Indian Super League. He started in the opening game itself against ATK on 20 October 2019 becoming the second-youngest player for the Blasters, behind Dheeraj Singh. He played 82 minutes in the defensive midfield position before being substituted by Sahal Abdul Samad, as Kerala Blasters beat ATK 2–1 at home. He was later awarded the Emerging Player of the Match award. Despite the fact that the Blasters had a poor season, he was one of their bright spots and ended up featuring in 13 games in his debut season for the senior side, playing mostly in his natural defensive midfielder position.

==== 2020–2021 season ====
On 12 December 2020, the Blasters announced that they have extended Jeakson's contract till the end of 2023 season. On 20 December, he scored his first goal in the Indian Super League as well as for the Blasters by coming in as a substitute for Rohit Kumar in the 46th minute against East Bengal during the stoppage time, taking the game to a 1–1 draw. On 27 December 2020, he had a good performance against Hyderabad, as Blasters registered their first win of the season by 2–0, where Jeakson won the Man of the Match award. In the Southern Derby against Bengaluru on 20 January 2021, Jeakson was deployed as a center-back for the first time in his career.

==== 2021–2022 season ====
Jeakson was included in the Blasters squad for the 2021 Durand Cup, where he played all three matches for the club in the tournament. He played his first league match of the 2021–22 season on 19 November 2021 in the season opener against ATK Mohun Bagan, which they lost 4–2. On 19 December, he provided an assist to Álvaro Vázquez who scored the second goal in a 3–0 victory against Mumbai City FC. Jeakson scored his first goal of the season against FC Goa on 2 January 2022, which ended in a dramatic 2–2 draw. He formed a solid partnership with Puitea in the midfield and helped the Blasters to reach the finals, which they lost to Hyderabad on penalties.

==== 2022–2023 season ====
On 25 April 2022, Jeakson signed a three-year contract extension that will keep him at the club till 2025. He played his first match of the 2022–23 Indian Super League season against East Bengal in the opening match of the season on 7 October, which they won 3–1. He was also included in the Blasters' squad for the 2023 Indian Super Cup season after the exit in the infamous ISL knockout stage match, and started as a substitute for Danish Farooq in the first group stage match against RoundGlass Punjab FC on 8 April 2023 in the 81st minute, as the Blasters won the match 3–1 at full-time.

==== 2023–2024 season ====
In July 2023, after the departure of Sahal Abdul Samad, Jeakson became the longest serving player in the Blasters squad. He played his first match of the season against Gokulam Kerala FC in the 2023 Durand Cup tournament on 13 August 2023, which they lost 3–4. In the first away league game of the season against Mumbai City on 8 October, Jeakson was substituted in the beginning of second half after suffering a shoulder injury following a challenge on Greg Stewart. On 20 October, the Blasters' assistant coach Frank Dauwen, during the pre-match press conference said that Jeakson needs surgery and will be out of action for two to three months. On 3 November, the club confirmed that Jeakson has successfully undergone his shoulder surgery.

=== East Bengal ===
On July 19, 2024, it was announced that Jeakson had signed with East Bengal. He signed a 4-year deal with them for a record transfer-fee of ₹3.2 Crore, which was the highest in the Indian football's history.

== International career ==
=== Youth ===
Jeakson represented the India under-17 side which participated in the 2017 FIFA U-17 World Cup which was hosted in India. In India's second match of the tournament, on 9 October 2017 against Colombia, he scored India's first-ever goal in a FIFA World Cup tournament. His 82nd-minute header from a corner was the equaliser for India but the team conceded again a minute later, and went on to be defeated 2–1. Jeakson later played for the India under-20 team and the India under-23 team.

=== Senior ===
After a breakthrough season with Kerala Blasters in the 2019–2021 season, he was named in the list of probables for India's World Cup Qualifier against Qatar, but didn't make it to the final squad.

In March 2021, Jeakson was included in the final squad for India's friendlies against Oman and UAE. He made his debut in a 1–1 draw against Oman on 25 March 2021.

Jeakson was named in the 23-men Indian squad for the 2021 SAFF Championship in Maldives. He made his only appearance in the tournament by coming as a substitute in the final against Nepal, where India won the match 3–0. In March 2022, he was again included in the national squad by coach Igor Štimac ahead of India's two friendly matches against Bahrain and Belarus. On 14 June, Jeakson provided an assist for Sunil Chhetri's second goal against Hong Kong in the 2023 AFC Asian Cup qualification, which India won 4–0.

== Personal life ==
His cousin, Amarjit Singh Kiyam, is also a footballer. Both of them represented the Indian under-17 national team in the 2017 FIFA U-17 World Cup India where Amarjit captained the side. Amarjit currently plays for Goa. His younger sister, Kritina Devi Thounaojam, also a footballer, represented India in youth teams.

== Career statistics ==
=== Club ===
As of matches played till 8 October 2023

Club	Season	League			Cup (Note: Includes Super Cup)		Continental		Other		Total	
Club	Season	Division	Apps	Goals	Apps	Goals	Apps	Goals	Apps	Goals	Apps	Goals
Minerva Punjab	2017–18	I-League	0	0	0	0	–		–		0	0
Indian Arrows (loan)	2017–18	I-League	8	0	1	0	–		–		9	0
Kerala Blasters B	2018–19	I-League 2nd Division	5	0	0	0	–		–		5	0
Indian Arrows (loan)	2018–19	I-League	1	0	0	0	–		–		1	0
Kerala Blasters	2019–20	Indian Super League	13	0	0	0	–		–		13	0
Kerala Blasters	2020–21	Indian Super League	16	1	0	0	–		–		16	1
Kerala Blasters	2021–22	Indian Super League	19	1	0	0	–		3 (Note: Appearance(s) in Durand Cup)	0	22	1
Kerala Blasters	2022–23	Indian Super League	20	0	3	0	–		–		23	0
Kerala Blasters	2023–24	Indian Super League	3	0	0	0	–		2	0	5	0
Kerala Blasters	Total		71	2	3	0	–		5	0	79	2
Career total			85	2	4	0	–		5	0	94	2

=== International ===
As of 5 June 2026

National team	Year	Apps	Goals
India	2021	2	0
India	2022	4	0
India	2023	13	0
India	2023	6	0
India	2023	3	0
India	2024	0	0
India	2025	0	0
India	2026	4	0
Total		32	0

== Honours ==
Kerala Blasters

- Indian Super League runner up: 2021–22

East Bengal

- Indian Super League: 2025-26

India

- SAFF Championship: 2021, 2023
- Tri-Nation Series: 2023
- Intercontinental Cup: 2023
