= AIFF Academy =

- Full name: AIFF-FIFA Talent Academy
- Founded: 2013; 13 years ago (as AIFF Elite Academy); 2023; 3 years ago (re-established as AIFF-FIFA Talent Academy)
- Dissolved: 2017; 9 years ago (merged into Indian Arrows)
- Ground: Bhubaneswar and Hyderabad
- League: Youth League

The AIFF Academy is the elite academy of the regional AIFF affiliated football academies.

Founded on 1 February 2013, the AIFF Elite Academy started as a youth development project between the AIFF and FIFA. The Elite Academy is the final frontier for players who train at the AIFF regional academies in various parts of India. It was re-established as the AIFF-FIFA Talent Academy in 2023.

== AIFF Elite Academy ==
In September 2011, it was announced that both All India Football Federation and FIFA would work together to set up various regional academies and one elite academy in India with the goal of developing youth footballers in the country. The first phase was starting of regional academies in Bangalore, Kolkata, Mumbai, Delhi and Sikkim. The second phase saw Chennai, Chandigarh, and Kerala getting academies by March 2013. Each academy consisted of 30–35 under–14 players who would eventually develop to the further youth stages.

Bangalore, Kolkata, and Delhi regional academies delayed while the Mumbai Academy was started with future India U23 coach, Arthur Papas. The reason given for the delay was due to the rampant age-cheating during trials for the regional academies. Of the 120 players selected after playing in the Subroto Cup and other youth competitions, 84 were found to be over-aged and not even acceptable for the under-16 category.

Eventually, the AIFF Elite Academy was launched in 2013. It was gradually integrated in the Indian Arrows.

== AIFF-FIFA Talent Academy ==
In 2023, AIFF in association with FIFA decided to set up an academy under the FIFA Talent Development Scheme. The academy was inaugurated by Arsene Wenger, the Chief of Global Football Development in FIFA. The academy was set up at Odisha Football Academy in Bhubaneswar, Odisha.

In 2025, the second FIFA Talent Academy, which also includes the first academy for girls', was opened at Hyderabad. The academy will be located at Gachibowli Stadium.

== See also ==
- Youth League
- Junior National Championship
- Subroto Cup
- Football in India
- Indian football league system
- History of Indian football
- Reliance Foundation Development League
