= 2018–19 East Bengal FC season =

Indian football club season

East Bengal
2018–19 season
- Owner: Quess East Bengal Pvt. Ltd.
- Chairman: Ajit Issac
- Manager: (India) Bastob Roy (Note: Bastob Roy remained the coach under Technical-Director Subhash Bhowmick.) (until 19 August 2018) (Spain) Alejandro Menéndez (from 19 August 2018)
- Stadium: Salt Lake Stadium; East Bengal Ground
- I-League: Runners-up
- Calcutta Football League: 3rd
- Indian Super Cup: Pre-Quarter Finals
- Top goalscorer: League: Jobby Justin; Enrique Esqueda (9 each); All: Jobby Justin (13)
- Highest home attendance: 64,867 vs Mohun Bagan (16.12.2018)
- Lowest home attendance: 9952 vs Indian Arrows (18.01.2019)
- Average home league attendance: 27,270
- Biggest win: East Bengal 5–0 Shillong Lajong F.C. (2018–19 I-League)
Home colours	Away colours	Third colours

The 2018–19 season is the club's 99th season in existence. East Bengal discontinued its tie-up with their main sponsors "Kingfisher" after 20 long years of partnership. On 5 July 2018, East Bengal announced a partnership with business giants Quess Corp as their main sponsors, leading to the formation of a new entity named "Quess East Bengal FC Pvt. Ltd." (QEBFC).

== Preseason overview ==
East Bengal FC roped in 4 players from 2017–18 I-League champions Minerva Punjab F.C.: goal-keeper Rakshit Dagar, defender Kamalpreet Singh, midfielder Kassim Aidara and forward Bali Gagandeep. East Bengal FC also signed experienced defender Kingshuk Debnath from arch-rivals Mohun Bagan. Veteran custodian Abhra Mondal rejoined East Bengal FC from Bengaluru FC. East Bengal FC also announced the signing of midfielder Sanchayan Samaddar who was part of the Bengal Santosh Trophy squad and promoted youngstar Ginkaholen Haokip from their junior squad. East Bengal FC roped in Costa Rica national team centre-back Jhonny Acosta who played all 3 games in the 2018 FIFA World Cup for a rumored fee of Rs. 1.4 Cr.
On 18 August, East Bengal FC announced former Real madrid B manager Alejandro Menéndez García as the new coach.
On 24 August, East Bengal FC announced the signing of former Granada C.F. centreback Borja Gómez Pérez. On 30 August, East Bengal FC signed former Mexico international Enrique Esqueda on a free transfer, however making him the highest paid footballer in I-League with a rumoured of Rs 4.2 Cr.

== Transfers ==
=== Promoted from Academy ===
No.	Pos.	Name
26	FW	(India) Bidyashagar Singh
34	FW	(India) Talem Suranjit Singh
36	MF	(India) Ginkaholen Haokip
37	FW	(India) Tetepuia Lalchanhima
39	DF	(India) Gurmukh Singh
41	DF	(India) Manoj Mohammed
43	MF	(India) PC Rohlupuia

=== Transfers in ===
No.	Pos.	Name	Previous Team	Month
5	GK	(India) Abhra Mondal	Bengaluru F.C.	June
4	DF	(India) Kingshuk Debnath	Mohun Bagan	June
40	GK	(India) Rakshit Dagar	Minerva Punjab F.C.	June
26	MF	(Senegal) Kassim Aidara	Minerva Punjab F.C.	June
14	DF	(India) Kamalpreet Singh	Minerva Punjab F.C.	June
9	MF	(India) Bali Gagandeep	Minerva Punjab F.C.	June
39	DF	(India) Sanchayan Samaddar	Calcutta Customs	June
23	DF	(India) Lalrozama Fanai	Aizawl F.C.	June
16	MF	(India) Lalrindika Ralte	NorthEast United FC	July
2	DF	(Costa Rica) Jhonny Acosta	Rionegro Águilas	July
3	DF	(Spain) Borja Gómez Pérez	UD San Sebastian	August
9	FW	(Mexico) Enrique Esqueda	Arka Gdynia	August
8	MF	(Spain) Jaime Santos	UP Langreo	November
	DF	(India) Hira Mondal	Peerless FC	September
10	MF	(Spain) Antonio Rodríguez Dovale	Nea Salamina FC (loan)	January
15	MF	(India) Siam Hanghal	Delhi Dynamos FC (loan)	January

=== Released mid-season ===
No.	Pos.	Name	Remarks
6	MF	(Syria) Mahmoud Amnah	Released due to Season-long Injury

=== Loaned out ===
No.	Pos.	Name	Team	Duration
19	FW	(India) Suhair VP	Gokulam Kerala F.C.	End of Season
21	MF	(India) Yami Longvah	TRAU F.C.	End of Season
29	DF	(India) Mehtab Singh	Gokulam Kerala F.C.	End of Season

== Team ==
=== First-team Squad ===
No.	Name	Nationality	Position	Date of birth (age)
Goalkeepers
1	Ubaid CK	(India)	GK	5 February 1990 (age 36)
12	Abhra Mondal	(India)	GK	3 October 1986 (age 40)
32	Mirshad Michu	(India)	GK	3 February 1994 (age 32)
40	Rakshit Dagar	(India)	GK	16 October 1992 (age 34)
Defenders
2	Jhonny Acosta	(Costa Rica)	CB	21 July 1983 (age 43)
3	Borja Gómez Pérez	(Spain)	CB	14 May 1988 (age 38)
4	Kingshuk Debnath	(India)	CB	8 May 1985 (age 41)
5	Kamalpreet Singh	(India)	RB	15 November 1997 (age 29)
23	Lalrozama Fanai	(India)	LB	30 November 1991 (age 34)
24	Salam Ranjan Singh	(India)	RB/LB/CB	4 December 1995 (age 30)
25	Samad Ali Mallick	(India)	RB	30 September 1994 (age 32)
27	Lalramchullova	(India)	RB/LB	14 January 1996 (age 30)
28	Koushik Sarkar	(India)	CB	8 February 1994 (age 32)
29	Mehtab Singh	(India)	RB	5 June 1998 (age 28)
33	Rahul Ghosh	(India)	LB	13 September 1998 (age 28)
39	Gurmukh Singh	(India)	RB	
41	Manoj Mohammed	(India)	LB	8 January 1999 (age 27)
Midfielders
7	Surabuddin Mollick	(India)	RW	4 May 1990 (age 36)
8	Jaime Santos Colado	(Spain)	RW/LW	27 April 1995 (age 31)
10	Antonio Rodríguez Dovale	(Spain)	CAM	4 April 1990 (age 36)
15	Siam Hanghal	(India)	CM	26 May 1993 (age 33)
16	Kassim Aidara	(Senegal)	CDM	12 May 1987 (age 39)
17	Laldanmawia Ralte	(India)	RW	19 December 1992 (age 33)
20	Lalrindika Ralte	(India)	RW	7 September 1992 (age 34)
30	Brandon Vanlalremdika	(India)	LW	28 January 1994 (age 32)
34	Sanchayan Samaddar	(India)	CM	
35	Yami Longvah	(India)	LW	15 May 1998 (age 28)
36	Ginkaholen Haokip	(India)	CAM	
38	Prakash Sarkar	(India)	CDM/RB	15 February 1997 (age 29)
43	PC Rohlupuia	(India)	CAM	
Forwards
9	Enrique Esqueda	(Mexico)	FW	19 April 1988 (age 38)
11	Bali Gagandeep	(India)	FW	2 June 1990 (age 36)
22	Jobi Justin	(India)	FW	10 November 1993 (age 33)
26	K. Bidyashagar Singh	(India)	FW	11 March 1998 (age 28)
37	Tetepuia Lalchanhima	(India)	FW	
42	Telem Suranjit Singh	(India)	FW	

Last updated: 11 July 2018
Source: East Bengal First Team

=== Technical staff ===
Position	Name
Manager (Head Coach)	(Spain) Alejandro Menéndez
Physical Trainer	(Spain) Carlos Nodar Paz
Video Analyst	(Spain) Mario Rivera Campesino
Assistant coach	(India) Bastob Roy
Assistant Physical Trainer	(India) Rudra Pratim Roy
Club Doctor	(India) Dr. Shantiranjan Dasgupta
Team Media Officer	(India) Gautam Roy
Team Observer	(India) Tushar Rakshit

== Season overview ==
East Bengal FC started the season with an entire makeover. East Bengal FC parted ways with long time sponsors Kingfisher after 20 years and entered into a new partnership with Quess Corp as their main investors. East Bengal FC is will be taking part in the 2018–19 I- League. East Bengal FC roped in Costa Rica national team center back Jhonny Acosta who played all 3 games in the 2018 FIFA World Cup. East Bengal also roped in ex-Granada CF centre-back Borja Gómez Pérez to strengthen their defence for their quest for the 2018–19 I-League. East Bengal announced ex-Real madrid B manager Alejandro Menéndez as the new coach.

=== August ===
East Bengal FC started off as the 8 times defending champions of the Calcutta Football League, in search of the 9th consecutive league title. The red and gold brigade started off with an abandoned game against Tollygunge Agragami however, won 2–0 comfortably against WB Police FC with Lalrindika Ralte opening the scoring for the season and Kassim Aidara making it 2–0. East Bengal FC succumbed to the defensive of Calcutta Customs FC as they failed to score and the match ended a goalless draw.
East Bengal FC won the next 5 games to lead to the all-important Kolkata Derby.

=== September ===
East Bengal FC made a great comeback against their arch-rivals Mohun Bagan in the first Kolkata Derby of the season, after the Mariners led 2-0 within 30 minutes. East Bengal FC rallied from behind with goals from star debutante Jhonny Acosta and the equalised from Laldanmawia Ralte from a Lalrindika Ralte corner.
East Bengal FC however lost the 2 next matches against Peerless FC and Mohammedan SC and eventually lost the title to arch-rivals Mohun Bagan after holding it for 8 long years.

East Bengal FC suffered a huge blow when the AIFF put on a Transfer Ban on the Red and Golds which will prevent them from signing any further player until 31 January 2018. The Transfer Ban was imposed after the AIFF disciplinary committee found East Bengal FC guilty of unethically poaching Sukhwinder Singh of Minerva Punjab which the player was still in contract with the team from Punjab.
Alejandro Menéndez took over the reins of the East Bengal FC manager after the Calcutta Football League ended and planned to play a few friendlies as a pre-season before the 2018–19 I-League.
East Bengal FC played FC Goa in a pre-season friendly on 22 September at Bambolim, Stadium, Goa and lost via a single goal after a terrific solo effort from Ferran Corominas put the Goan side ahead in the 75th minute. East Bengal put up a great fight against the Indian Super League side after just 3 days of new coach Alejandro Menendez took over.

=== October ===
East Bengal FC flew off to Malaysia for 3 weeks to conduct the Pre-season for the upcoming 2018–19 I-League. East Bengal FC would stay at the MSN Sports Complex Residential Training Facilities at Kuala Lumpur and play 5 practice matches in the interim.
East Bengal FC faced Malaysia Premier League side UiTM F.C. on 7 October in the first Pre-season game in Malaysia. After conceding an early goal, the Red and Gold brigade made a come-back and rallied past 4 goals to win 1–4 against the Malaysian side. Yami Longvah, Enrique Esqueda, Mahmoud Amnah and Jobi Justin were on the score-sheet.
East Bengal was to play against another Malaysia Premier League side UKM F.C. on 10 October in the second of the 5 pre-season friendlies however due to bad pitch conditions due to excessive rainfall, the match was abandoned before kick-off.
East Bengal played against Malaysia Super League side Terengganu F.C. on 13 October in the next Pre-season friendly game in Malaysia. Ex-East Bengal fans' heartthrob Do Dong Hyun featured in the match against the Red and Golds. East Bengal FC drew 0–0 against the Malaysia Super League side who became runners-up in the 2018 Malaysia Cup.
East Bengal played against Malaysia Premier League side PDRM FA in the next pre-season game where they won handsomely by a 6-2 margin, with Jobi Justin netting twice and goals each from Enrique Esqueda, Surabuddin Mollick and Bidyashagar Singh with another one being an own-goal.
East Bengal faced UiTM F.C. Reserves in the last pre-season friendly at Malaysia where they won 1-0 courtesy of a goal from Enrique Esqueda. The Red and Gold brigade remain undefeated in the pre-season tour in Malaysia

East Bengal FC faced NEROCA F.C. in the first game of 2018–19 I-League season, away at Imphal. Mexican frontman Enrique Esqueda's brace with one in each half ensured the Red and Golds have a perfect start to the campaign. Academy graduate Manoj Mohammed debuted for the Red and Golds as a Left-back and gained huge praise for his excellent performance.

=== November ===
East Bengal FC faced Shillong Lajong F.C. in the second game of the campaign, again away at Shillong which they won 3–1. Jobi Justin's brace in the first half along with academy graduate Bidyashagar Singh's goal in the second half ensured East Bengal FC win. Manoj Mohammed again started for the Red and Gold brigade as East Bengal FC defence looked properly organized to throw off any attack from the home side. With 6 points from the first two games, this is East Bengal FC's best start to an I-League campaign since 2010–11.
East Bengal FC faced Chennai City F.C. on 13 November, at Salt Lake Stadium, Kolkata for the first home game of the season which they lost 1–2. Sandro Rodríguez scored the first goal from a free-kick in the dying moments of the first half for Chennai City F.C. to give them a 1–0 lead at HT. Enrique Esqueda equalized for the Red and Golds however Néstor Gordillo scored the winner for the away team in the 85th min from the spot.
On 21 November, AIFF lifted the ban imposed on East Bengal FC on signing new players. On 23 November, East Bengal FC announced the signing of their 6th Foreigner ]Jaime Santos Colado of Spain who previously played in the Segunda Division B for teams like Sporting de Gijón B and CD Mirandés as a Winger and Attacking midfielder.
East Bengal FC faced Aizawl F.C. next on 24 November, away at Aizawl and in a crunch game, the Red and Gold brigade lost 3–2. Aizawl F.C. took the lead early, but East Bengal FC came back into the game in the second half to lead 1-2 however two late goals from the home side took the game away from East Bengal FC. East Bengal FC was denied a clear goal, when Lalramchullova's free-kick hit the crossbar and bounced back from inside the goal into play, the referee kept the game on, not adjudging it a goal.

=== December ===
East Bengal FC faced the reigning champions Minerva Punjab F.C. on 4 December, at the Salt Lake Stadium, Kolkata where they lost by a solitary goal. William Opoku scored the decisive goal in the 78th minute of the game after East Bengal custodian Ubaid C.K. made a mistake. This was East Bengal FC's 3rd defeat in succession.
East Bengal FC faced the Gokulam Kerala F.C. on 8 December, at the Salt Lake Stadium, Kolkata next which they won by 3–1, credit to an all-round performance from Joby Justin who assisted the first goal for Brandon Vanlalremdika, scored the second and was a constant threat at the Gokulam Kerala's penalty box. Lalramchullova scored the third for the Red and Gold Brigade which ensured 3 points for the home side.
East Bengal FC faced Mohun Bagan on 16 December, at the Salt Lake Stadium, Kolkata for the first leg of Kolkata Derby of the I-League season and in a thrilling encounter, the Red and Gold brigade emerged victorious by 3–2 with the Mariners going down to 10 men in the second half. It was Mohun Bagan who took an early lead in the 13 min when Omar Elhussieny dodged past Lalramchullova to put in a perfect cross for Azharuddin Mallick to slot in into an empty net. East Bengal FC equalized just 4 minutes later with Laldanmawia Ralte netting home from an excellent through ball from Jobi Justin. Jobi Justin was again on the mark when he scored in the 44th minute with a sublime overhead volley to take the lead in the Kolkata Derby. After the break, Mohun Bagan was down to 10 men as Kingsley Obumneme was sent off for a double booking when he stopped Jobi Justin from behind after he was nutmegged. East Bengal FC increased their lead from the resulting free-kick as Laldanmawia Ralte was again at the position from a perfect cross from Lalrindika Ralte to make it 3–1 in the 61st minute. This was Laldanmawia Ralte's 4th goal in Kolkata Derby. Dipanda Dicka reduced the margin for Mohun Bagan in the 75th minute, however, the Red and Gold brigade held on to the lead and won their first Derby after 33 months gap.
East Bengal FC faced Churchill Brothers on 20 December, at the Tilak Maidan in Goa and after being 1-0 down within 2 minutes from a Willis Plaza strike, East Bengal rallied back with strikes from Jaime Santos and Lalrindika Ralte. Jaime Santos scored a perfect volley from a Lalrindika Ralte corner to equalize the game and in the second half it was Lalrindika Ralte himself who scored directly from a free-kick to win 3 points for the Red and Gold brigade.
East Bengal FC faced Real Kashmir F.C. on 28 December, at home but failed to get 3 points from the fixture after the game ended in a 1–1 draw. Lalramchullova put the ball inside his own net just after the break but it was none other than Jobi Justin who scored the equalizer for East Bengal FC to secure a point for the home side.

=== January ===
On 8 January 2019, East Bengal FC faced Indian Arrows at Kalinga Stadium in Bhubaneshwar and in a hard-fought contest the Red and Gold brigade came out victorious by 1–2, courtesy of goals from Laldanmawia Ralte and Jobi Justin one in each half. Arrows scored one consolation late in the second half but East Bengal FC managed to hold on to the lead and emerge with 3 points/ Lalrindika Ralte missed a penalty in the first half which could have increased the lead for East Bengal FC.
East Bengal FC faced Chennai City F.C. away at Coimbatore on 14 January next where in a crunch encounter East Bengal FC lost 2-1 even after taking the lead in the 9th minute courtesy of a Laldanmawia Ralte goal. The home team rallied to score 2 goals with defensive lapses from the Red and Gold Brigade.
East Bengal FC faced Indian Arrows next on 18 January at home and in a lacklusture game, the Red and Gold brigade managed to win by a solitary goal courtesy of Jaime Santos who tapped home from a Jobby Justin grounded cross.
East Bengal FC faced Mohun Bagan next on 27 January in the return leg of the Kolkata Derby and like the first leg derby, East Bengal FC again managed to win against their arch-rivals by 2–0 with goals from Jaime Santos and Jobby Justin. This was the first time since 2003–04, and only the 3rd time overall that East Bengal FC managed an NFL/I-League Derby Double against their arch-rivals Mohun Bagan.

=== February ===
East Bengal FC faced NEROCA F.C. next on 7 February at the Salt Lake Stadium and made a remarkable comeback victory after going behind 0-1 as early as in the 3rd minute when Chencho Gyeltshen scored for the visitors. The home team tried hard but could find the back of the net, until Enrique Esqueda came in as a super sub and scored a brilliant headed brace to secure all three points for East Bengal FC
East Bengal FC faced Shillong Lajong F.C. next on 14 February at the Salt Lake Stadium and displayed complete dominance as they won by 5–0 against the highlanders. Laldanmawia Ralte bragged the first hat-trick of the season for East Bengal FC while the other two were scored by Jobby Justin and Enrique Esqueda.
East Bengal FC faced Churchill Brothers S.C. next on 17 February at the Salt Lake Stadium and could only manage a 1–1 draw after ex-East Bengal FC frontman Willis Plaza scored to take a 0–1 lead for the away team, which was equalized by Kassim Aidara, who headed home from a Lalrindika Ralte freekick to make it 1–1.
East Bengal FC faced Aizawl F.C. next on 25 February at the Salt Lake Stadium for the last home game of the season and could only manage a point which hampered their title hopes. Aizawl F.C. took the lead in the first half which was then equalized by Enrique Esqueda in the second half. The Red and Gold brigade failed to score the winning goal as Jobby Justin's header came off the bar in the dying minutes of the match.
Jobby Justin was suspended after the match for spitting charges and is supposed to miss the next 6 matches.
East Bengal FC faced Real Kashmir F.C. next on 28 February at Delhi and in a sublime first half display took an early lead of 2–0 with goals from Enrique Esqueda and Jaime Santos. The Kashmir team managed to score a goal in the second half from the penalty spot however East Bengal FC managed to emerge victorious, keeping their title hopes alive.

=== March ===
East Bengal FC faced Minerva Punjab F.C. in the penultimate game of the season on 3 March at Chandigarh and had to win to keep their title hopes alive and in a thriller of a game, East Bengal FC managed a 1–0 win courtesy of a cool finish from none other than frontman Enrique Esqueda. With this victory, East Bengal FC sits at 39 points from 19 matches, just 1 point behind the league leaders Chennai City F.C. with the last match scheduled on 9 March 2019 for both the teams, which will be the decider for the 2018–19 I-League title.
On 6th Match, East Bengal FC announced a 2 years contract extension for coach Alejandro Menéndez Garcia and his team.

=== April ===
East Bengal F.C. gave walk over to Delhi Dynamos F.C. in the Round of 16 in 2019 Indian Super Cup.

== Kit ==
Supplier: TYKA / Sponsors: Quess Corp / Co-Sponsor:

Home	Away	Third Kit

== Competitions ==
=== Overall ===
Competition	First match	Last match	Final Position
IFA Shield (Note: U-19 Tournament since 2015.)	8 July 2018	19 July 2018	Champions
Calcutta Football League	3 August 2018	18 September 2018	3rd
GTA Chairman's Gold Cup (Darjeeling)	15 December 2018	23 December 2018	Champions
I-League	27 October 2018	9 March 2019	Runners up
Super Cup	30 March 2019	30 March 2019	Round of 16 (Note: Walkover given in Round of 16)

=== Overview ===
Competition	Record							
Competition	Pld	W	D	L	GF	GA	GD	Win %
CFL	11	7	2	2	19	7	+12	63.64
I League	20	13	3	4	37	20	+17	65.00
Super Cup	0	0	0	0	0	0	+0	—
Total	31	20	5	6	56	27	+29	64.52

Last updated: 9 March 2019
Source: Competitions

=== Calcutta Football League ===
Pos	Team	Pld	W	D	L	GF	GA	GD	Pts	Qualification or relegation
1	Mohun Bagan (C)	11	9	2	0	27	6	+21	29	Champion
2	Peerless SC	11	8	1	2	20	8	+12	25	
3	East Bengal	11	7	2	2	19	7	+12	23	
4	Mohammedan	11	6	1	4	12	8	+4	19	Qualified for I-League 2nd Division
5	Rainbow	11	5	2	4	15	13	+2	17	Qualified for I-League 2nd Division

Updated to match(es) played on 26 September 2018. Source:
(C) Champions

==== Matches ====
Win Draw Loss

3 August 2018 1	East Bengal	1–1 (ABD)	Tollygunge Agragami	East Bengal Ground, Kolkata
16:30 IST	Richard (o.g.) 2'	To be Replayed	Daniel Bedemi 30'	Attendance: 23000; Referee: Uttam Sarkar

6 August 2018 2	East Bengal	2–0	WB Police FC	East Bengal Ground, Kolkata
16:30 IST	Lalrindika Ralte 14'; Kassim Aidara 38'	Report	Subhas Ghosh (yellow card) 60'	Attendance: 11000; Referee: Animesh Biswas; Man of the Match: Lalrindika Ralte (East Bengal)

10 August 2018 3	East Bengal	0–0	Calcutta Customs	East Bengal Ground, Kolkata
16:30 IST		Report	Rajon Barman (yellow card) 31'; Amit Das (yellow card) 45+2'; John Ampong (yellow card) 49'; Sourav Das (yellow card) 81'	Attendance: 17000; Referee: Biplab Poddar; Man of the Match: Subham sen (Culcatta Customs)

14 August 2018 4	East Bengal	3–0	Pathachakra	East Bengal Ground, Kolkata
16:30 IST	Jobi Justin 15' 78'; Laldanmawia Ralte 41' (pen.)	Report	Futa Nakamura (yellow card) 65'	Attendance: 10000; Referee: Pranjal Bannerjee; Man of the Match: Jobi Justin (East Bengal)

18 August 2018 5	East Bengal	3–0	Aryans FC	East Bengal Ground, Kolkata
16:30 IST	Kassim Aidara 27'; Laldanmawia Ralte 50'; Samad Ali Mallick (yellow card) 65'; Mahmoud Amnah 69'; Lalramchullova (yellow card) 73'	Report	Sameer Pradhan (yellow card) 45+3'	Attendance: 22000; Referee: Tannmoy Dhar; Man of the Match: Laldanmawia Ralte (East Bengal)

23 August 2018 1* (Rematch)	East Bengal	3–0	Tollygunge Agragami	East Bengal Ground, Kolkata
16:30 IST	Brandon Vanlalremdika 15'; Jobi Justin 21'; Samad Ali Mallick 41'	Report		Attendance: 18,000; Referee: Prabir Dhar; Man of the Match: Brandon Vanlalremdika (East Bengal)

26 August 2018 6	East Bengal	1–0	NBP Rainbow AC	East Bengal Ground, Kolkata
16:30 IST	Lalramchullova 26' (pen.); Kamalpreet Singh (yellow card) 49'; Rakshit Dagar (yellow card) 90+5'	Report	Abhijit Sarkar (yellow card) 22'; Dibyendu Sarkar (yellow card) 25'; Godwin Quashiga (yellow card) 87'	Attendance: 20,000; Referee: Dipy Roy; Man of the Match: Mahmoud Amnah (East Bengal)

29 August 2018 7	East Bengal	2–1	George Telegraph	East Bengal Ground, Kolkata
16:30 IST	Mehtab Singh 75'; Koushik Sarkar 90+2'	Report	Justice Morgan 69'; Rajiv Shaw (yellow card) 77'	Attendance: 16,000; Referee: Uttam Sarkar; Man of the Match: Koushik Sarkar (East Bengal)

2 September 2018 8^{(KD)}	East Bengal	2–2	Mohun Bagan	Salt Lake Stadium, Kolkata
16:30 IST	Jhonny Acosta 45+2'; Kassim Aidara (yellow card) 52'; Mahmoud Amnah (yellow card) 58'; Laldanmawia Ralte 61'	Report	Pintu Mahata 20'; Henry Kisekka 30'; Shilton D'Silva (yellow card) 49'; Shilton Paul (yellow card) 58'	Attendance: 66,182; Referee: Pranjal Banerjee; Man of the Match: Pintu Mahata (Mohun Bagan)

6 September 2018 9	East Bengal	1–2	Peerless FC	East Bengal Ground, Kolkata
16:30 IST	Kassim Aidara 71' (yellow card) 80'	Report	Ansumana Kromah 6'; Sandip Kumar Paul (yellow card) 26'; Dalraj Singh (yellow card) 29'; Narahari Srestha 77'	Attendance: 12,000; Referee: Prabir Dhar; Man of the Match: Narahari Srestha (Peerless FC)

11 September 2018 10	East Bengal	1–2	Mohammedan	Salt Lake Stadium, Kolkata
16:30 IST	Jhonny Acosta 12'; Laldanmawia Ralte (yellow card) 22'	Report	Laltu Hembram (yellow card) 23'; Lancine Toure (yellow card) 45'; Philip Adjah 87' 90+11'	Attendance: 5,000; Referee: Dipu Roy; Man of the Match: Philip Adjah (Mohammedan

18 September 2018 11	East Bengal	1–0	Food Corporation of India	East Bengal Ground, Kolkata
16:30 IST	Jobi Justin 14'	Report		Attendance: 2,000

=== Preseason ===
==== Fixtures and results ====
Win Draw Loss

22 September 2018 Friendly	FC Goa	1–0	East Bengal	Bambolim Stadium, Goa
19:30 IST	Ferran Corominas 75'	Report		Attendance: 500

7 October 2018 Friendly	UiTM F.C.	1–4	East Bengal	UiTM Stadium, Shah Alam, Malaysia
18:00 IST	28'	Report	Yami Longvah 39'; Enrique Esqueda 45' (pen.); Borja Gomez Perez (yellow card) 60'; Mahmoud Amnah 80' (pen.); Jobi Justin 82'	Attendance: 200

10 October 2018 Friendly	UKM F.C.	(ABD)	East Bengal	USIM Mini Stadium, Nilai, Malaysia
14:30 IST		Abandoned due to bad playing conditions

13 October 2018 Friendly	Terengganu F.C.	0–0	East Bengal	USIM Mini Stadium, Nilai, Malaysia
14:30 IST		Report

17 October 2018 Friendly	PDRM FA	2–6	East Bengal	MSN Ground, Kuala Lumpur
07:00 IST	Petri?or Voinea 49', 53'	Report	Surabuddin Mollick 30'; Enrique Esqueda 43', 63' ?? (o.g.); Bidyashagar Singh 70'; Jobi Justin 73', 89'

19 October 2018 Friendly	UiTM F.C. Reserves	0–1	East Bengal	Sime Darby Field, Kuala Lumpur
14:15 IST			Enrique Esqueda 30'

=== I-League ===
Pos	Team	Pld	W	D	L	GF	GA	GD	Pts	Qualification or relegation
1	Chennai City (C)	20	13	4	3	48	28	+20	43	Qualification for AFC Champions League preliminary round 1 (Note: If the league champions cannot qualify for the AFC Champions League group stage, they will enter the AFC Cup group stage.)
2	East Bengal	20	13	3	4	37	20	+17	42	
3	Real Kashmir	20	10	7	3	25	14	+11	37 (Note: The game between Minerva Punjab and Real Kashmir was rescheduled, but eventually it was not played and both teams were awarded a point.)	
4	Churchill Brothers	20	9	7	4	35	23	+12	34	
5	Mohun Bagan	20	8	5	7	27	28	−1	29	

Source: I-league
Rules for classification: 1) points; 2) head-to-head points; 3) head-to-head goal difference; 4) goal difference; 5) number of goals scored; 6) drawing of lots
(C) Champions

==== Result summary ====
Overall								Home						Away					
Pld	W	D	L	GF	GA	GD	Pts	W	D	L	GF	GA	GD	W	D	L	GF	GA	GD
20	13	3	4	37	20	+17	42	5	3	2	20	10	+10	8	0	2	17	10	+7

Last updated: 9 March 2019.
Source: i-league.org

==== Results by round ====
Round	1	2	3	4	5	6	7	8	9	10	11	12	13	14	15	16	17	18	19	20
Ground	A	A	H	A	H	H	H	A	H	A	A	H	A	H	H	H	H	A	A	A
Result	W	W	L	L	L	W	W	W	D	W	L	W	W	W	W	D	D	W	W	W
Position	2	1	2	4	8	6	5	2	4	4	4	4	4	4	3	2	2	2	2	2

Updated to match(es) played on 9 March 2019. Source: Soccrway
A = Away; H = Home; W = Win; D = Draw; L = Loss

==== Matches ====
Win Draw Loss

27 October 2018 1	Neroca FC	0–2	East Bengal	Khuman Lampak Stadium, Imphal
14:00 IST	Eduardo Ferreira (yellow card) 27'; Subhash Singh (yellow card) 60'	Report	Enrique Esqueda 10', 48' (pen.); Manoj Mohammed (yellow card) 62'	Attendance: 26,400; Referee: Raktim Saha; Man of the Match: Enrique Esqueda (East Bengal)

1 November 2018 2	Shillong Lajong F.C.	1–3	East Bengal	JL Nehru Stadium, Shillong
14:00 IST	Lalrohlua (yellow card) 43'; Rakesh Pradhan 71'	Report	Jobi Justin 12', 41'; Jhonny Acosta (yellow card) 46'; Bidyashagar Singh 74'	Attendance: 4320; Referee: Rabichandra Singh Irengbam; Man of the Match: Jobi Justin (East Bengal)

13 November 2018 3	East Bengal	1–2	Chennai City F.C.	Salt Lake Stadium, Kolkata
17:00 IST	Surabuddin Mollick (yellow card) 41'; Lalrindika Ralte (yellow card) 45'; Enrique Esqueda 52' (yellow card) 67'; Rakshit Dagar (yellow card) 86'	Report	Sandro Rodríguez 45+2'; Néstor Gordillo 87' (pen.)	Attendance: 25,272; Referee: Crystal John; Man of the Match: Edwin Vanspaul (Chennai City F.C.)

24 November 2018 4	Aizawl F.C.	3–2	East Bengal	Rajiv Gandhi Stadium, Aizawl
14:00 IST	Léonce Dodoz Zikahi 25'; David Lalrinmuana (yellow card) 33'; Albert Zohmingmawia (yellow card) 36'; Joe Zoharliana 74'; David Lalbiakzara (yellow card) 79'; Lalkhawpuimawia 84'	Report	Lalrindika Ralte (yellow card) 13'; Enrique Esqueda (yellow card) 33'; Jobi Justin 64'; Borja Gomez Perez 70'	Attendance: 3,612; Referee: Rosario Fernandes; Man of the Match: Léonce Dodoz Zikahi (Aizawl F.C.)

4 December 2018 5	East Bengal	0-1	Minerva Punjab F.C.	Salt Lake Stadium, Kolkata
17:00 IST	Jhonny Acosta (yellow card) 73'	Report	William Opoku 78'	Attendance: 16,821; Referee: Crystal John; Man of the Match: William Opoku (Minerva Punjab F.C.)

8 December 2018 6	East Bengal	3–1	Gokulam Kerala FC	Salt Lake Stadium, Kolkata
17:00 IST	Brandon Vanlalremdika 4'; Jobi Justin 15'; Lalramchullova (yellow card) 63' (goal) 82'; Lalrindika Ralte (yellow card) 77'	Report	Deepak kumar (yellow card) 33'; Christian Sabah 57'; Guilherme Batata (yellow card) 77'	Attendance: 14,206; Referee: Priyobrata Singh; Man of the Match: Jobi Justin (East Bengal FC)

16 December 2018 7^{(KD)}	East Bengal	3–2	Mohun Bagan	Salt Lake Stadium, Kolkata
17:00 IST	Laldanmawia Ralte 17', 63'; Jobi Justin 44'; Jhonny Acosta (yellow card) 48'; Manoj Mohammed (yellow card) 53'	Report	Kingsley Obumneme (yellow card) 12' (yellow-red card) 59'; Azharuddin Mallick 13'; Shilton D'Silva (yellow card) 18'; Yuta Kinowaki (yellow card) 25'; Aser Pierrick Dipanda 75'; Gurjinder Kumar (yellow card) 76'; Abhishek Ambekar (yellow card) 82'	Attendance: 64,867; Referee: Venkatesh R Man of the Match: Laldanmawia Ralte (East Bengal FC)

20 December 2018 8	Churchill Brothers S.C.	1–2	East Bengal	Tilak Maidan, Vasco da Gama
17:00 IST	Willis Plaza 3' (yellow card) 3'; Khalid Aucho (yellow card) 45+3'; Richard Costa (yellow card) 68'; Nallappan Mohanraj (yellow card) 90+4'	Report	Jaime Santos 34'; Lalrindika Ralte 79'; Bali Gagandeep (yellow card) 87' (yellow-red card) 90'	Attendance: 3,027; Referee: Maria Joseph Arokia; Man of the Match: Jaime Santos (East Bengal FC)

28 December 2018 9	East Bengal	1–1	Real Kashmir F.C.	Salt Lake Stadium, Kolkata
17:00 IST	Jobi Justin 57'		Lalramchullova (o.g.) 46'; Loveday Enyinnaya (yellow card) 65'	Attendance: 19,778; Referee: Rahul Kumar Gupta; Man of the Match: Jobi Justin (East Bengal FC)

8 January 2019 10	Indian Arrows	1–2	East Bengal	Kalinga Stadium, Bhubaneshwar
14:00 IST	Aniket Jadhav (yellow card) (yellow-red card) 82' 84'; Ninthoinganba Meetei 90' (pen.)		Laldanmawia Ralte 26'; Lalramchullova (red card) 55'; Jobi Justin 59'; Brandon Vanlalremdika (yellow card) 90+4'	Attendance: 500; Referee: Senthil Nathon S Man of the Match: Joby Justin (East Bengal FC)

14 January 2019 11	Chennai City F.C.	2–1	East Bengal	JL Nehru Stadium, Coimbatore
19:30 IST	Sri Ram (yellow card) 37'; Pedro Manzi 49'; Roberto Eslava (yellow card) 55'; Alexander Romario 60'		Laldanmawia Ralte 9'; Samad Ali Mallick (yellow card) 27'; Antonio Rodríguez Dovale (yellow card) 31'; Jaime Santos (yellow card) 55'; Lalrindika Ralte (yellow card) 55'	Referee: Rahul Kumar Gupta; Man of the Match: Alexander Romario (Chennai City F.C.)

18 January 2019 12	East Bengal	1–0	Indian Arrows	Salt Lake Stadium, Kolkata
17:00 IST	Jaime Santos (yellow card) 28' (goal) 48'; Lalramchullova (yellow card) 29'; Manoj Mohammed (yellow card) 86' (yellow-red card) 90+4'			Attendance: 9952; Referee: Tejas Visvasrao Nagvenkar; Man of the Match: Borja Gomez Perez (East Bengal FC)

27 January 2019 13^{(KD)}	Mohun Bagan	0–2	East Bengal	Salt Lake Stadium, Kolkata
17:00 IST	Omar Elhussieny (yellow card) 22'; Darren Caldeira (yellow card) 73'; Sony Norde (yellow card) 83'		Jaime Santos 35'; Jobby Justin 75' (yellow card) 76'	Attendance: 62,628; Referee: CR Srikrishna; Man of the Match: Jobby Justin (East Bengal FC)

7 February 2019 14	East Bengal	2–1	Neroca F.C.	Salt Lake Stadium, Kolkata
17:00 IST	Lalrindika Ralte (yellow card) 31'; Kamalpreet Singh (yellow card) 37'; Borja Gomez Perez (yellow card) 62'; Enrique Esqueda 67', 86'		Chencho Gyeltshen 3'; Varney Kallon (yellow card) 12'; Singam Subhash Singh (yellow card) 63'; Saikhom Ronald Singh (yellow card) 89'	Attendance: 34,852; Referee: Venkatesh R Man of the Match: Enrique Esqueda (East Bengal FC)

14 February 2019 16	East Bengal	5–0	Shillong Lajong F.C.	Salt Lake Stadium, Kolkata
17:00 IST	Laldanmawia Ralte 8', 27', 60'; Jobby Justin 29'; Enrique Esqueda 45'		Aiban Dohling (yellow card) 87'	Attendance: 24,979; Referee: Om Prakash Thakur; Man of the Match: Laldanmawia Ralte (East Bengal FC)

17 February 2019 17	East Bengal	1–1	Churchill Brothers S.C.	Salt Lake Stadium, Kolkata
17:00 IST	Borja Gomez Perez (yellow card) 9'; Jhonny Acosta (yellow card) 33'; Kassim Aidara 78'		Willis Plaza (yellow card) 36' (goal) 70'; Anthony Wolfe (yellow card) 55'; Lorougnon Christ Remi (yellow card) 81'	Attendance: 43,768; Referee: Raktim Saha; Man of the Match: Lalrindika Ralte (East Bengal FC)

25 February 2019 18	East Bengal	1–1	Aizawl F.C.	Salt Lake Stadium, Kolkata
17:00 IST	Enrique Esqueda 65'; Borja Gomez Perez (yellow card) 70'		Léonce Dodoz Zikahi 23'; Ansumana Kromah (yellow card) 45'; Kareem Omolaja (yellow card) 69' (red card) 69'	Attendance: 17,204; Referee: Umesh Bora; Man of the Match: Léonce Dodoz Zikahi (Aizawl F.C.)

28 February 2019 15*	Real Kashmir F.C.	1–2	East Bengal	JLN Stadium, Delhi
14:00 IST	Enrique Esqueda 20'; Jaime Santos 42'; Borja Gomez Perez (yellow card) 87'		Mason Robertson (yellow card) 26'; Abednego Tetteh (red card) 28'; Aaron Katebe 67' (pen.); Gnohere Krizo (yellow card) 83'	Attendance: 2,792; Referee: Rowan Arumughan; Man of the Match: Enrique Esqueda (East Bengal FC)

3 March 2019 19	Minerva Punjab F.C.	0–1	East Bengal	Tau Devi Lal Stadium, Chandigarh
14:00 IST			Enrique Esqueda 75'; Kassim Aidara (yellow card) 80'; Rakshit Dagar (yellow card) 83'	Attendance: 3,800; Referee: Om Prakash Thakur; Man of the Match: Laldanmawia Ralte (East Bengal FC)

9 March 2019 20	Gokulam Kerala FC	1–2	East Bengal	EMS Stadium, Kozhikode
17:00 IST	Monotosh Chakladar (yellow card) 52'; Marcus Joseph 70' (yellow card) 89'; Daniel Addo (yellow card) 86'		Jaime Santos 79' (pen.) (yellow card) 90+7'; Laldanmawia Ralte 86'	Attendance: 4,123; Referee: Rahul Gupta; Man of the Match: Laldanmawia Ralte (East Bengal FC)

=== Super Cup ===
East Bengal FC along with six other I-League clubs — Minerva Punjab F.C., Mohun Bagan, NEROCA F.C., Gokulam Kerala F.C., Aizawl F.C., and Chennai City F.C. — announced they will withdraw from Super Cup, citing "unfair treatment to I-League clubs."

==== Brackets ====
Round of 16
31 March
Mohun Bagan
Bengaluru	w/o
31 March
Pune City	2
Chennai City	4
30 March
Indian Arrows	0
Goa	3
2 April
Jamshedpur	w/o
Churchill Brothers
29 March
Chennaiyin	2
Mumbai City	0
3 April
NEROCA
NorthEast United	w/o
30 March
Delhi Dynamos	w/o
East Bengal
1 April
ATK	3
Real Kashmir	1

Quarter-finals
4 April
Bengaluru	1
Chennai City	2
6 April
Goa	4
Jamshedpur	3
7 April
Chennaiyin	2
NorthEast United	1
5 April
Delhi Dynamos	3
ATK	4

Semi-finals
9 April
Chennai City	0
Goa	3
10 April
Chennaiyin	2
ATK	0

Final
13 April
Goa	2
Chennaiyin	1

==== Matches ====
Win Draw Loss

30 March 2019 Pre QF	Delhi Dynamos	(Walkover) (Note: Walkover given by East Bengal due to protest)	East Bengal	Kalinga Stadium, Bhubaneshwar
20:30 IST		Report

== Statistics ==
=== Appearances ===
Players with no appearances are not included in the list.
As of end of 2018–19 season.

Appearances for East Bengal in 2018–19 season
No.	Pos.	Nat.	Name	CFL		I League		Super Cup		Total	
No.	Pos.	Nat.	Name	Apps	Starts	Apps	Starts	Apps	Starts	Apps	Starts
Goalkeepers
1	GK	(India)	Ubaid CK	2	1	2	2	-	-	4	3
40	GK	(India)	Rakshit Dagar	10	10	18	18	-	-	28	28
Defenders
2	DF	(Costa Rica)	Jhonny Acosta	3	3	18	18	-	-	21	21
3	DF	(Spain)	Borja Gomez Perez	-	-	19	19	-	-	19	19
4	DF	(India)	Kingshuk Debnath	8	8	-	-	-	-	8	8
5	DF	(India)	Kamalpreet Singh	11	9	13	10	-	-	24	19
23	DF	(India)	Lalrozama Fanai	2	2	-	-	-	-	2	2
24	DF	(India)	Salam Ranjan Singh	-	-	5	3	-	-	5	3
25	DF	(India)	Samad Ali Mallick	9	9	14	3	-	-	23	12
27	DF	(India)	Lalramchullova	9	9	18	17	-	-	27	26
28	DF	(India)	Koushik Sarkar	1	1	-	-	-	-	1	1
29	DF	(India)	Mehtab Singh	11	11	-	-	-	-	11	11
41	DF	(India)	Manoj Mohammed	-	-	16	16	-	-	16	16
Midfielders
6	MF	(Syria)	Mahmoud Amnah	11	9	-	-	-	-	11	9
7	MF	(India)	Surabuddin Mollick	8	2	4	0	-	-	12	2
8	MF	(Spain)	Jaime Santos	-	-	14	12	-	-	14	12
10	MF	(Spain)	Antonio Rodríguez Dovale	-	-	11	9	-	-	11	9
15	MF	(India)	Siam Hanghal	-	-	2	0	-	-	2	0
16	MF	(Senegal)	Kassim Aidara	11	11	18	16	-	-	29	27
17	MF	(India)	Laldanmawia Ralte	10	10	19	19	-	-	29	29
20	MF	(India)	Lalrindika Ralte	7	5	18	18	-	-	25	23
21	MF	(India)	Yami Longvah	2	1	4	3	-	-	6	4
26	MF	(India)	Bidyashagar Singh	6	2	6	0	-	-	12	2
30	MF	(India)	Brandon Vanlalremdika	9	7	19	9	-	-	28	16
34	MF	(India)	Sanchayan Samaddar	3	0	-	-	-	-	3	0
38	MF	(India)	Prakash Sarkar	3	1	3	0	-	-	6	1
43	MF	(India)	P.C. Rohlupuia	-	-	1	0	-	-	1	0
Forwards
9	FW	(Mexico)	Enrique Esqueda	-	-	14	12	-	-	14	12
11	FW	(India)	Bali Gagandeep	10	3	3	0	-	-	13	3
22	FW	(India)	Jobi Justin	9	9	17	17	-	-	26	26

=== Goal scorers ===
As of end of 2018–19.

Goals for East Bengal in 2018–19 season
Rank	No.	Pos.	Nat.	Name	CFL	I League	Indian Super Cup	Total
1	22	FW	(India)	Jobi Justin	4	9	0	13
2	17	MF	(India)	Laldanmawia Ralte	3	8	0	11
3	9	FW	(Mexico)	Enrique Esqueda	-	9	0	9
4	8	MF	(Spain)	Jaime Santos	0	5	0	5
5	16	MF	(Senegal)	Kassim Aidara	3	1	0	4
6	20	MF	(India)	Lalrindika Ralte	1	1	0	2
6	30	MF	(India)	Brandon Vanlalremdika	1	1	0	2
6	27	DF	(India)	Lalramchullova	1	1	0	2
6	2	DF	(Costa Rica)	Jhonny Acosta	2	0	0	2
10	26	MF	(India)	Bidyashagar Singh	0	1	0	1
10	3	DF	(Spain)	Borja Gomez Perez	0	1	0	1
10	6	MF	(Syria)	Mahmoud Amnah	1	0	0	1
10	25	DF	(India)	Samad Ali Mallick	1	0	0	1
10	29	DF	(India)	Mehtab Singh	1	0	0	1
10	28	DF	(India)	Koushik Sarkar	1	0	0	1
				Own Goals	-	-	-	
				TOTAL	19	37	0	56

==== Hat-tricks ====
Player	Against	Result	Date	Competition
Laldanmawia Ralte	Shillong Lajong F.C.	5-0	14 February 2019	2018–19 I-League

=== Clean sheets ===
Correct as of matches played on 9 March 2019

No.	Player	CFL	I League	Super Cup	TOTAL
40	Rakshit Dagar	6	5	0	11
1	Ubaid CK	1	0	0	1

=== Disciplinary record ===
As of matches played 9 March 2019

No.	Pos.	Name	CFL			I League			Indian Super Cup			Total			Remarks
No.	Pos.	Name	Yellow card	(yellow card) (yellow-red card)	Red card	Yellow card	(yellow card) (yellow-red card)	Red card	Yellow card	(yellow card) (yellow-red card)	Red card	Yellow card	(yellow card) (yellow-red card)	Red card	Remarks
25	DF	Samad Ali Mallick	1	0	0	1	0	0				1	1	0	
27	DF	Lalramchullova	1	0	0	3	0	1				4	0	1	Suspended for match against Chennai City F.C.
5	MF	Kamalpreet Singh	1	0	0	1	0	0				2	0	0	
40	GK	Rakshit Dagar	1	0	0	2	0	0				3	0	0	
16	MF	Kassim Aidara	2	0	0	1	0	0				3	0	0	
6	MF	Mahmoud Amnah	1	0	0	0	0	0				1	0	0	
17	MF	Laldanmawia Ralte	1	0	0	0	0	0				1	0	0	
41	DF	Manoj Mohammed	0	0	0	3	1	0				3	1	0	Suspended for match against Mohun Bagan
2	DF	Jhonny Acosta	0	0	0	4	0	0				4	0	0	Suspended for match against Aizawl F.C.
7	MF	Surabuddin Mollick	0	0	0	1	0	0				1	0	0	
20	MF	Lalrindika Ralte	0	0	0	5	0	0				5	0	0	Suspended for match against Indian Arrows
9	FW	Enrique Esqueda	0	0	0	2	0	0				2	0	0	
11	FW	Bali Gagandeep	0	0	0	1	1	0				1	1	0	Suspended for match against Real Kashmir F.C.
30	MF	Brandon Vanlalremdika	0	0	0	1	0	0				1	0	0	
10	MF	Antonio Rodriguez Dovale	0	0	0	1	0	0				1	0	0	
8	MF	Jaime Santos	0	0	0	3	0	0				3	0	0	
22	FW	Jobby Justin	0	0	0	1	0	0				1	0	0	
3	DF	Borja Gomez Perez	0	0	0	4	0	0				4	0	0	Suspended for match against Minerva Punjab F.C.

== Honours ==
=== Titles Won ===
- 2018 IFA Shield Champions (29th time)

*U-19 tournament since 2015. Defeated Mohun Bagan U-19 in the final: 1–1; 4–3 (p)

- GTA Chairman's Gold Cup (Darjeeling Gold Cup 2018) Champions (5th time)

East Bengal Reserves team played in the tournament. Defeated Mohammedan Sporting in the final: 0-0; 3-1 (p)

=== Player Awards ===
==== Quess EBFC Player of the Month ====
No.	Month	Name
1	October	(India) Manoj Mohammed
2	November	(India) Jobby Justin
3	December	(India) Jobby Justin
4	January	(Costa Rica) Jhonny Acosta
5	February	(Mexico) Enrique Esqueda

== See also ==
- 2018–19 in Indian football
- 2018 CFL Premier Division
- 2018–19 I-League
- 2019 Super Cup
- List of East Bengal F.C. managers
- List of Foreign Players for East Bengal FC
