= Gaurav Bora =

Indian professional footballer

Personal information
- Date of birth: 13 July 1998 (age 28)
- Place of birth: Guwahati, Assam, India
- Height: 1.84 m (6 ft 1/2 in)
- Position: Centre-back

Team information
- Current team: Churchill Brothers
- Number: 44

Youth career
- Pune

Senior career*
Years	Team	Apps	(Gls)
2017–2019	Pune City	0	(0)
2018	Pune City B	9	(1)
2017–2018	→ Chennai City (loan)	7	(0)
2018–2019	→ Chennai City (loan)	20	(2)
2019–2022	Odisha	41	(0)
2022–2024	NorthEast United	13	(0)
2024–2026	Mohammedan	23	(0)
2026–	Churchill Brothers	4	(1)

International career^{‡}
2019–2021	India U23	2	(0)
- * Club domestic league appearances and goals as of 5 November 2026 ‡ National team caps and goals as of 15:16, 24 March 2019 (UTC)

Gaurav Bora (Assamese: গৌৰব বৰা; born 13 July 1998) is an Indian professional footballer who plays as a defender for Indian Super League club Churchill Brothers.

== Club career ==
Born in Guwahati, Assam, Bora moved with his family to Delhi when he was younger. After playing for his school team, Bora was selected to be trained at the Baichung Bhutia Football School. Due to his good performance with the team, Bora was selected to represent the Delhi under-16 state team and was scouted to have a trial with Pune City. His trial was successful and Bora joined the Pune City Academy.

In November 2017, Bora was loaned to Chennai City of the I-League. He made his professional debut for the club on 29 November 2017 against Indian Arrows. He only played 26 minutes as Chennai City were defeated 3–0. After impressing the Chennai City coaching staff during the 2017–18 season, Bora was loaned back to the club the next season. During the 2018–19 season, Bora was moved by head coach Akbar Nawas from midfield to central defense, where he created a solid partnership with Roberto Eslava.

On 9 March 2019, Bora scored a brace in Chennai City's last match of the season against Minerva Punjab which helped the club win their first ever I-League title, and Bora's first trophy.

=== Odisha ===
On 27 June 2019, it was announced that Bora had joined Delhi Dynamos of the Indian Super League. Bora then made his debut for the re-branded club i.e. Odisha FC, on 22 December 2019 against Goa where he came on as a halftime substitute for Daniel Lalhlimpuia. The match eventually ended up as a 0–3 defeat for Odisha.

=== NorthEast United ===
On 25 August 2022, Gaurav joined Indian Super League club NorthEast United from Odisha for the upcoming season.

== International ==
On 13 February 2019, Bora was called up to the India under-23 side which participated in the 2020 AFC U-23 Championship qualifiers. He made his debut for the side in their first match of the qualifiers against Uzbekistan U23. He played the whole match as India U23 were defeated 2–0 and eventually failed to qualify.

== Career statistics ==
=== Club ===
As of 15 January 2023

Club	Season	League			Cup		AFC		Total	
Club	Season	Division	Apps	Goals	Apps	Goals	Apps	Goals	Apps	Goals
Pune City B	2017–18	I-League 2nd Division	9	1	0	0	—		9	1
Chennai City (loan)	2017–18	I-League	7	0	1 (Note: Appearance(s) in Super Cup)	0	—		8	0
Chennai City (loan)	2018–19	I-League	20	2	3	0	—		23	2
Chennai City (loan)	Chennai City total		27	2	4	0	0	0	31	2
Odisha	2019–20	Indian Super League	10	0	0	0	—		10	0
Odisha	2020–21	Indian Super League	18	0	0	0	—		18	0
Odisha	2021–22	Indian Super League	13	0	0	0	—		13	0
Odisha	Odisha total		41	0	0	0	0	0	41	0
NorthEast United	2022–23	Indian Super League	12	0	0	0	—		12	0
Career total			89	3	4	0	0	0	93	3

== Honours ==
=== Club ===
Chennai City

- I-League: 2018–19
