= 2018–19 Indian Elite League =

Elite League
- Season: 2018–19
- Champions: Minerva Punjab (1st title)
- Matches: 310
- Goals: 1,024 (3.3 per match)
- Top goalscorer: Siva Sakthi (22 goals)
- Highest scoring: Kerala Blasters 12-2 Raman Vijayan SS
- Highest attendance: 1,500; East Bengal 2-0 Mohun Bagan
- All statistics correct as of complete.

The 2018–19 Elite League, also known as 2018–19 Hero Elite League for sponsorship reasons and formerly known as Youth League U18, was the eleventh season of the Indian Elite League and the fourth season of the competition as an under-18 one. Shillong Lajong were the defending champions, but could not advance to knock out stage.

== Qualifiers ==
=== Kolkata zone ===
The qualifiers for Kolkata Zone were divided in two groups with five teams in each group, with SAI (East Zone), United S.C., and Rainbow AC advanced to the zonal round.

==== Group A ====
Pos	Team	Pld	W	D	L	GF	GA	GD	Pts	Qualification	SAI	USC	BMSA	BFA	BSC
1	SAI (East Zone)	4	3	0	1	6	3	+3	9	Advanced to zonal round	—	2–1	0–1	2–0	2–1
2	United	4	3	0	1	13	4	+9	9	Advanced to zonal round	–	—	2–1	2–1	8–0
3	Bidhannagar Municipal SA	4	2	1	1	5	3	+2	7		–	–	—	1–1	2–0
4	Bengal Football Academy	4	1	1	2	3	5	−2	4		–	–	–	—	1–0
5	Baranagar Sporting Club	4	0	0	4	1	13	−12	0		–	–	–	–	—

Source: Soccerway

==== Group B ====
Pos	Team	Pld	W	D	L	GF	GA	GD	Pts	Qualification	NBR	MDSC	HDSA	BWP	SS
1	NBP Rainbow AC	4	2	2	0	13	5	+8	8	Advanced to zonal round	—	2–2	2–2	2–0	7–1
2	Mohammedan	4	2	2	0	10	3	+7	8		–	—	1–1	4–0	3–0
3	The Hooghly District SA	4	2	2	0	9	5	+4	8		–	–	—	3–0	3–2
4	Bhawanipore	4	1	0	3	2	9	−7	3		–	–	–	—	2–0
5	Southern Samity	4	0	0	4	3	15	−12	0		–	–	–	–	—

Source: Soccerway

=== Maharashtra zone ===
Pos	Team	Pld	W	D	L	GF	GA	GD	Pts	Qualification	RFYC	IB	FSI	SMR	FCM
1	RF Young Champs	4	4	0	0	13	0	+13	12	Advanced to zonal round	—	2–0	3–0	6–0	2–0
2	Iron Born FC	4	2	1	1	5	5	0	7	Advanced to zonal round	–	—	1–1	3–2	1–0
3	Football School of India	4	1	2	1	5	6	−1	5	Advanced to zonal round	–	–	—	2–2	2–0
4	Steadfast – Mumbai Rush	4	1	1	2	7	11	−4	4	Advanced to zonal round	–	–	–	—	3–0
5	FC Mumbaikars	4	0	0	4	0	8	−8	0		–	–	–	–	—

Source: Soccerway

== Zonal round ==
Tiebreakers
The teams are ranked according to points (3 points for a win, 1 point for a draw, 0 points for a loss). If two or more teams are equal on points on completion of the group matches, the following criteria are applied in the order given to determine the rankings:
1. Greater number of points obtained in the matches between the Teams concerned
2. Goal difference resulting from the matches between the Teams concerned
3. Greater number of goals scored in the matches between the Teams concerned
4. Goal difference in all the matches
5. Greater number of goals scored in all the matches
6. Drawing of lots

=== Delhi zone ===
Pos	Team	Pld	W	D	L	GF	GA	GD	Pts	Qualification	DDFC	SDV	BBFS	RSA	HIN	DU
1	Delhi Dynamos	10	7	2	1	38	8	+30	23	Advanced to final round	—	2–2	0–1	8–1	6–0	8–0
2	Sudeva Moonlight	10	7	2	1	36	7	+29	23	Advanced to final round	2–2	—	0–1	8–0	4–0	6–1
3	Bhaichung Bhutia FS	10	6	1	3	26	9	+17	19		1–3	0–1	—	0–1	4–0	3–0
4	Real Sports Academy	10	3	1	6	9	29	−20	10		1–3	0–2	1–3	—	1–1	1–0
5	Hindustan	10	1	4	5	10	25	−15	7		0–3	1–3	2–2	4–0	—	1–1
6	Delhi United	10	0	2	8	4	45	−41	2		0–3	0–8	1–11	0–3	1–1	—

Source: Soccerway

=== Karnataka–Andhra zone ===
The matches of Karnataka–Andhra zone kicked off on 8 October 2018 with Ananthpur Sports Academy defeating Boca Juniors 2–0 in the opening game.

Pos	Team	Pld	W	D	L	GF	GA	GD	Pts	Qualification	BFC	FCM	OFC	ASA	BJFS
1	Bengaluru	8	7	0	1	39	8	+31	21	Advanced to final round	—	4–2	3–1	12–1	6–1
2	FC Mangalore	8	5	1	2	23	9	+14	16	Advanced to playoffs	2–1	—	2–1	2–0	8–0
3	Ozone	8	5	0	3	25	10	+15	15		0–3	1–0	—	7–0	7–0
4	Ananthapur Sports Academy	8	2	0	6	7	36	−29	6		0–4	0–5	1–5	—	3–1
5	Boca Juniors FS	8	0	1	7	6	37	−31	1		1–6	2–2	1–3	0–2	—

Source: Soccerway

=== Chennai zone ===
Pos	Team	Pld	W	D	L	GF	GA	GD	Pts	Qualification	CFC	RVSS	CCFC	FPP	MFC
1	Chennaiyin	8	6	2	0	37	9	+28	20	Advanced to final round	—	2–2	4–2	6–2	1–1
2	Raman Vijayan Soccer School	8	3	3	2	27	21	+6	12	Advanced to playoffs	0–7	—	2–2	7–0	6–4
3	Chennai City	8	3	3	2	18	12	+6	12		2–3	1–1	—	1–0	1–1
4	Football Plus PSA	8	2	0	6	8	24	−16	6		0–5	2–1	0–1	—	3–1
5	FC Madras	8	1	2	5	13	37	−24	5		0–9	3–8	1–8	2–1	—

Source: Soccerway

=== Kolkata zone ===
Pos	Team	Pld	W	D	L	GF	GA	GD	Pts	Qualification	MB	EB	ATK	USC	SAI	NBR
1	Mohun Bagan	10	6	3	1	16	6	+10	21	Advance to final round	—	0–2	1–0	2–1	2–0	3–1
2	East Bengal	10	5	3	2	16	7	+9	18	Advance to final round	0–1	—	1–1	2–0	2–1	0–1
3	ATK	10	4	4	2	22	9	+13	16		1–1	2–2	—	0–0	4–1	6–1
4	United	10	3	4	3	16	13	+3	13		1–1	0–0	1–6	—	2–2	4–0
5	SAI (East Zone)	10	2	3	5	8	15	−7	9		0–0	1–2	1–0	0–3	—	2–0
6	NBP Rainbow AC	10	1	1	8	3	31	−28	4		0–5	0–5	0–2	0–4	0–0	—

Source: Soccerway

=== Maharashtra zone ===
Pos	Team	Pld	W	D	L	GF	GA	GD	Pts	Qualification	FCPC	RFYC	IB	MCFC	SMR	FSI
1	Pune City	10	9	0	1	29	5	+24	27	Advanced to final round	—	2–0	3–1	1–0	4–0	2–0
2	RF Young Champs	10	6	2	2	18	9	+9	20	Advanced to final round	1–3	—	3–0	1–1	1–0	4–0
3	Iron Born FC	10	5	1	4	15	14	+1	16		2–1	2–3	—	0–1	1–0	
4	Mumbai City	10	3	3	4	12	12	0	12		1–4	1–1	1–2	—	3–0	0–0
5	Steadfast – Mumbai Rush	10	2	1	7	2	16	−14	7		0–3	0–1	0–3	1–0	—	0–0
6	Football School of India	10	0	3	7	4	24	−20	3		0–6	0–3	1–3	2–4	0–1	—

Source: Soccerway

=== Shillong–Guwahati zone ===
Pos	Team	Pld	W	D	L	GF	GA	GD	Pts	Qualification	SAIG	SLFC	LFC	GTC	NEUFC
1	SAI (Guwahati)	8	7	0	1	17	6	+11	21	Advanced to final round	—	2–1	4–1	4–2	2–0
2	Shillong Lajong	8	6	0	2	21	6	+15	18	Advanced to playoffs	1–0	—	0–1	2–1	8–0
3	Langsning	8	5	0	3	15	10	+5	15		0–1	1–4	—	5–0	2–0
4	Gauhati Town	8	2	0	6	9	19	−10	6		1–2	1–3	0–3	—	2–0
5	NorthEast United	8	0	0	8	1	22	−21	0		0–2	0–2	1–2	0–2	—

Source: Soccerway

=== Goa zone ===
Pos	Team	Pld	W	D	L	GF	GA	GD	Pts	Qualification	SFC	FCG	SCG	DSC	SESA	CBSC
1	Salgaocar	10	8	0	2	25	8	+17	24	Advance to final round	—	0–2	2–1	3–1	3–0	5–1
2	Goa	10	6	3	1	18	4	+14	21	Advance to final round	1–0	—	0–2	2–0	0–0	4–0
3	Sporting Goa	10	5	2	3	18	10	+8	17		0–1	0–3	—	2–2	1–0	7–0
4	Dempo	10	3	4	3	15	11	+4	13		1–2	1–1	1–1	—	0–0	7–0
5	SESA	10	2	3	5	13	12	+1	9		0–3	0–0	1–2		—	5–2
6	Churchill Brothers	10	0	0	10	5	50	−45	0		1–6	1–5	0–2	0–2	0–7	—

Source: Soccerway

=== Jharkhand–Odisha zone ===
Pos	Team	Pld	W	D	L	GF	GA	GD	Pts	Qualification	JAM	FAO	SHO	SAIL
1	Jamshedpur	6	4	2	0	13	3	+10	14	Advanced to playoffs	—	4–0	1–0	1–0
2	FAO Academy	6	3	0	3	8	15	−7	9		1–5	—	1–0	3–2
3	Sports Hostel Odisha	6	2	1	3	9	10	−1	7		2–2	3–1	—	1–3
4	SAIL Bokaro	6	1	1	4	8	10	−2	4		0–0	1–2	2–3	—

Source: Soccerway

=== Punjab zone ===
Pos	Team	Pld	W	D	L	GF	GA	GD	Pts	Qualification	MIN	YFC	RGS	UPJ
1	Minerva Punjab	6	5	1	0	8	1	+7	16	Advanced to playoffs	—	1–0	1–0	3–1
2	Youth FC	6	3	1	2	6	5	+1	10		0–1	—	1–0	1–0
3	Round Glass Sports	6	2	2	2	8	4	+4	8		0–0	2–2	—	1–0
4	United Punjab FC	6	0	0	6	2	14	−12	0		0–2	1–2	0–5	—

Source: Soccerway

=== Rest Of India zone ===
==== Group A ====
All matches were played at Panampally Ground, Kochi.

Pos	Team	Pld	W	D	L	GF	GA	GD	Pts	Qualification	KB	MSP	GK	SAI	FCK
1	Kerala Blasters	4	2	2	0	12	3	+9	8	Advanced to playoffs	—	0–0	2–0	2–2	8–1
2	MSP Football Academy	4	2	2	0	7	1	+6	8	Advanced to playoffs	–	—	1–1	1–0	5–0
3	Gokulam Kerala	4	2	1	1	6	5	+1	7		–	–	—	1–0	4–2
4	SAI (Thiruvananthapuram)	4	1	1	2	4	4	0	4		–	–	–	—	2–0
5	FC Kerala	4	0	0	4	3	19	−16	0		–	–	–	–	—

Source: soccerway

==== Group B ====
All matches were played at Khuman Lampak Turf Ground, Imphal.

Pos	Team	Pld	W	D	L	GF	GA	GD	Pts	Qualification	AIZ	TRA	NER	GAH
1	Aizawl	3	3	0	0	15	0	+15	9	Advanced to playoffs	—	3–0	4–0	8–0
2	TRAU	3	2	0	1	6	6	0	6		–	—	4–2	2–1
3	NEROCA	3	1	0	2	4	9	−5	3		–	–	—	2–1
4	Gangtok Himalayan	3	0	0	3	2	12	−10	0		–	–	–	—

Source: Soccerway

==== Group C ====
All matches will be played at TRC Turf Ground, Srinagar.

Pos	Team	Pld	W	D	L	GF	GA	GD	Pts	Qualification	RK	LK	JKS
1	Real Kashmir	2	2	0	0	10	0	+10	6	Advanced to playoffs	—	9–0	1–0
2	Lonestar Kashmir	2	1	0	1	1	9	−8	3		–	—	1–0
3	J&K State FA	2	0	0	2	0	2	−2	0		–	–	—

Source: Soccerway

==== Group D ====
All matches were played at Kahaani Sports Academy Ground, Ahmedabad.

Pos	Team	Pld	W	D	L	GF	GA	GD	Pts	Qualification	KAH	ARA	FLA	FAH
1	Kaahani FC	3	2	1	0	4	2	+2	7	Advanced to playoffs	—	2–1	2–1	0–0
2	ARA FC	3	1	1	1	5	3	+2	4		–	—	4–1	0–0
3	Football Leaders Academy	3	1	0	2	4	6	−2	3		–	–	—	2–0
4	Fateh Hyderabad	3	0	2	1	0	2	−2	2		–	–	–	—

Source: Soccerway

== Playoffs ==
Ten teams entered this round, out of which five will progress to the final round.

=== Group A ===
All matches played at Navelim Ground, Margao.

Pos	Team	Pld	W	D	L	GF	GA	GD	Pts	Qualification	MSP	MP	RK	FCM	KAH
1	MSP Academy	4	3	0	1	10	3	+7	9	Advance to final round	—	0–3	2–0	5–0	3–0
2	Minerva Punjab	4	2	2	0	13	5	+8	8	Advance to final round	—	—	0–0	5–5	5–0
3	Real Kashmir	4	2	1	1	6	2	+4	7	Advance to final round	—	—	—	1–0	5–0
4	FC Mangalore	4	1	1	2	7	11	−4	4		—	—	—	—	2–0
5	Kahaani FC	4	0	0	4	0	15	−15	0		—	—	—	—	—

Source: Soccerway

=== Group B ===
All matches played at Navelim Ground, Margao.

Pos	Team	Pld	W	D	L	GF	GA	GD	Pts	Qualification	SLFC	AFC	KB	JFC	RVSS
1	Shillong Lajong	4	2	2	0	7	1	+6	8	Advance to final round	—	1–1	0–0	2–0	4–0
2	Aizawl	4	2	2	0	5	2	+3	8	Advance to final round	—	—	1–1	2–0	1–0
3	Kerala Blasters	4	1	3	0	13	3	+10	6		—	—	—	0–0	12–2
4	Jamshedpur	4	1	1	2	4	5	−1	4		—	—	—	—	4–1
5	Raman Vijayan SS	4	0	0	4	3	21	−18	0		—	—	—	—	—

Source: Soccerway

== Final round ==
=== Group A ===
All matches played at Nagoa Ground, Nagoa.

Pos	Team	Pld	W	D	L	GF	GA	GD	Pts	Qualification	FCG	FCP	MSP	SFC
1	Goa	3	2	1	0	3	1	+2	7	Advance to Knockout stage	—	1–0	0–0	2–1
2	Pune City	3	2	0	1	5	3	+2	6	Advance to Knockout stage	—	—	2–1	3–1
3	MSP FA	3	0	2	1	3	5	−2	2		—	–	—	2–2
4	Sudeva	3	0	1	2	4	6	−2	1		—	—	—	—

Source: Soccerway

=== Group B ===
Matches played at Don Bosco Ground, Borda and Nagoa Ground, Nagoa.

Pos	Team	Pld	W	D	L	GF	GA	GD	Pts	Qualification	MP	CFC	RFYC	SLFC
1	Minerva Punjab	3	2	1	0	5	0	+5	7	Advance to Knockout stage	—	2–0	3–0	0–0
2	Chennaiyin	3	2	0	1	5	3	+2	6	Advance to Knockout stage	–	—	4–1	1–0
3	RF Young Champs	3	1	0	2	3	8	−5	3		—	–	—	2–1
4	Shillong Lajong	3	0	1	2	1	3	−2	1		—	—	—	—

Source: Soccerway

=== Group C ===
All matches played at Utorda Ground, Utorda.

Pos	Team	Pld	W	D	L	GF	GA	GD	Pts	Qualification	EB	SAIG	BFC	DDFC
1	East Bengal	3	1	2	0	2	0	+2	5	Advance to Knockout stage	—	1–1	1–1	1–0
2	SAI (Guwahati)	3	1	1	1	2	3	−1	4	Advance to Knockout stage	–	—	2–1	0–2
3	Bengaluru	3	1	1	1	6	3	+3	4		–	–	—	4–0
4	Delhi Dynamos	3	1	0	2	2	5	−3	3		—	—	—	—

Source: Soccerway

=== Group D ===
All matches played at Utorda Ground, Utorda.

Pos	Team	Pld	W	D	L	GF	GA	GD	Pts	Qualification	AFC	MB	RK	SAL
1	Aizawl	3	2	0	1	9	5	+4	6	Advance to Knockout stage	—	3–4	2–1	4–0
2	Mohun Bagan	3	2	0	1	7	4	+3	6	Advance to Knockout stage	–	—	0–1	3–0
3	Real Kashmir	3	2	0	1	4	3	+1	6		—	—	—	2–1
4	Salgaocar	3	0	0	3	1	9	−8	0		—	—	—	—

Source: Soccerway

== Knockout stage ==
=== Bracket ===
Quarter Finals
Goa	3
SAI Guwahati	1
Minerva Punjab (p)	1 (6)
Mohun Bagan	1 (5)
East Bengal	1
Pune City	2
Aizawl	1
Chennaiyin	0

Semi-Finals
Goa	0
Minerva Punjab	1
Pune City	2
Aizawl	0

Final
Minerva Punjab	2
Pune City	0
Third Place

=== Quarter-finals ===
2 February 2019
09:00 IST

Goa	3–1	SAI Guwahati
Doyal Alves 13', 78'; Jovito Joao Dias 88'		87' Shano Tariang

Don Bosco Ground, Fatorda
Attendance: 100
Referee: Ankush Chakraborty
2 February 2019
15:00 IST

East Bengal	1–2	Pune City
Srikumar Karjee 37'		11', 33' Laldawngkima

Don Bosco Ground, Fatorda
Attendance: 50
Referee: Vishal
3 February 2019
09:00 IST

Minerva Punjab	1–1	Mohun Bagan
Makan Chote 75'		7' Anirban Das
Penalties
	6–5

Don Bosco Ground, Fatorda
Attendance: 25
Referee: Ashwin
3 February 2019
15:00 IST

Aizawl	1–0	Chennaiyin
R Lalthanmawia 16'

Don Bosco Ground, Fatorda
Attendance: 25
Referee: Jatinder Singh

=== Semi-finals ===
6 February 2019
9:00 IST

Goa	0–1	Minerva Punjab
		17' Makan Chote

Nagoa Ground, Margao
Attendance: 150
Referee: Ashwin
6 February 2019
15:00 IST

Pune City	2–0	Aizawl
Nikhil Prabhu 22'; Akhil Rawat 90+4'

Nagoa Ground, Margao
Attendance: 100
Referee: Ankush Chakraborty

=== Final ===
8 February 2019
15:30 IST

Minerva Punjab	2–0	Pune City
Makan Chote 59'; Thoiba Singh 67'

Don Bosco Ground, Borda, Margao
Attendance: 110
Referee: Ashwin

== Statistics ==
=== Top scorers ===
As of 8 February 2019

Rank	Player	Club	Goals
1	Sivasakthi Narayanan	Raman Vijayan SS	22
2	Murshid KP	FC Mangalore	14
3	Akashdeep Singh	Bengaluru	13
4	Ashley Alban Koli	IRON BORN	10
4	Muhammed Nemil Valiyattil	RF Young Champs	10
6	Seiminmang Manchong	Delhi Dynamos	9
6	Thoi Singh	RF Young Champs	9
6	Aaron Bareto	Salgaocar	9
6	Surag Chhetri	Kerala Blasters	9
6	Nongthombam Joysana Singh	Chennaiyin	9
6	Prathap E	MSP FA	9
6	R Zothanmawia	Aizawl	9

=== Clean Sheets ===
As of 8 February 2019

Rank	Player	Club	Clean sheets
1	Manav Baraskar	FC Goa	9
2	Devansh Dabas	Minerva	8
3	Christurajan T	MSP FA	7
3	Van Nunmawia	Aizawl	7
5	Rewang Dorjee Lepcha	Pune City	6
6	Kalyan Hasda	SAI (East)	5
6	Khoirom Jackson Singh	Reliance Foundation YC	5
8	Birendra Rabha Singh	Reliance Foundation YC	4
8	Avishak Shaw	United	4
8	Paramveer Singh	Bhaichung Bhutia FS	4
8	Raj Kumar Mahato	Jamshedpur	4
8	Akshat Hadkonkar	Sporting Goa	4
8	Sapam Nongpoknganba Singh	SESA	4
8	Wellyster Mendes	Dempo	4
8	C Vanlalhriata	Shillong Lajong	4
8	Ayon Roy	East Bengal	4
