= Pradhyum Reddy =

Scottish football manager

Personal information
- Date of birth: 31 May 1976 (age 50)
- Place of birth: Dumfries, Scotland

Team information
- Current team: Philippines Women U17 (head coach)

Managerial career
- Years: Team
- 2010–2012: Shillong Lajong
- 2013: DSK Shivajians
- 2013–2016: Bengaluru (assistant)
- 2017–2018: Pune City (assistant)
- 2018: Pune City (caretaker)
- 2018–2019: Pune City (technical director)
- 2025–: Philippines Women U17

Pradhyum Reddy (born 31 May 1976) is a Scottish football manager based in India. He is the CEO of Dempo and head coach of the Philippines women's national under-17 team. He also works as football pundit in the Indian Super League and TV show Football United.

== Coaching career ==
=== 2011–2012: Shillong Lajong ===
In 2011, Reddy helped Shillong Lajong to promotion to the I-League by winning the I-League 2nd Division. After successfully keeping the team in the I-League in 2011–12 I-League season, Reddy was moved to the role of Technical Director of the club's Youth Development team. Reddy later resigned due to contractual disputes with the club.

=== 2013: DSK Shivajians ===
After leaving Shillong Lajong, Reddy signed for DSK Shivajians F.C. in the I-League 2nd Division.

=== 2013: Assistant with Bengaluru ===
On 25 June 2013, it was confirmed that Reddy had left DSK and signed with Bengaluru FC of the I-League as the assistant coach.

=== 2017–2019: Pune City ===
In 2017, Reddy moved to FC Pune City in the role of assistant coach for their 2017–18 season.

During the 2018–19 season, he was appointed at the Technical Director at the club. However, just three matches into the season, Reddy was appointed at the interim coach of the club, following the sacking of manager Miguel Ángel Portugal on 26 October 2018. He stayed in the role until the 24 December 2018 when Pune City appointed Phil Brown as their new head coach.

=== 2022–present: Dempo ===
Since 2022, Reddy has been the CEO of Dempo which participates in the I-League. He heads the administration of the First team, Academy, Youth Development, Grassroots and Scouting.

=== 2025–present: Philippines Women U17 ===
In 2025, Reddy was appointed the head coach of the Philippines women's under-17 team for the 2026 AFC U-17 Women's Asian Cup qualifiers.

== Statistics ==
=== Managerial statistics ===
As of 17 October 2025.

Team	From	To	Record				
Team	From	To	G	W	D	L	Win %
(India) Shillong Lajong	2011	2012	37	14	8	15	37.84
(India) DSK Shivajians	2013	2013	8	5	2	1	62.50
(India) Pune City	26 October 2018	24 December 2018	9	3	1	5	33.33
Philippines Women U17	13 October 2025	present	3	3	0	0	100.00
Total			57	25	11	21	43.86
