= 2018–19 I-League =

12th season of the I-League

I-League
- Season: 2018–19
- Champions: Chennai City; 1st I-League title 1st Indian title
- Relegated: Shillong Lajong
- AFC Champions League: Chennai City
- Matches: 109
- Goals: 303 (2.78 per match)
- Top goalscorer: Pedro Manzi; Willis Plaza (21 goals)
- Biggest home win: Real Kashmir 6–1 Shillong Lajong (11 December 2018) Chennai City 6–1 Shillong Lajong (29 December 2018); East Bengal 5-0 Shillong Lajong (14 February 2019)
- Biggest away win: Mohun Bagan 0–3 Churchill Brothers (25 November 2018) Shillong Lajong 0–3 Indian Arrows (13 January 2019)
- Highest scoring: Real Kashmir 6–1 Shillong Lajong (11 December 2018) Chennai City 6–1 Shillong Lajong (29 December 2018) Chennai City 4–3 Aizawl (18 January 2019)
- Longest winning run: Chennai City, East Bengal (4 games)
- Longest unbeaten run: Real Kashmir (13 games)
- Longest winless run: Shillong Lajong (11 games)
- Longest losing run: Shillong Lajong (5 games)
- Highest attendance: 64,867; East Bengal 3–2 Mohun Bagan (16 December 2018)
- Lowest attendance: 100; Indian Arrows 0–2 Chennai City (8 February 2019)
- Total attendance: 1,114,349
- Average attendance: 10,223

The 2018–19 I-League was the 12th season of the I-League, the top Indian professional football league, since its establishment in 2007. The season started on 26 October 2018 and is scheduled to conclude in March 2019. Unlike the Indian Super League, the I-League did not take a mid-season break during the 2019 AFC Asian Cup.

Minerva Punjab was the defending champions having won the previous season. Real Kashmir joined as a promoted club from the I-League 2nd Division. Churchill Brothers, having been relegated the previous season, were given an exemption by the All India Football Federation for this season.

Chennai City FC were the champions for this season, winning the title on the last day. This was their first title win in the history of the club. The top scorer in the league was Chennai City FC's Pedro Manzi, who finished the season with 21 goals.

== Teams ==
Locations of the I-League clubs

=== Stadiums and locations ===
Team	City/State	Stadium	Capacity
Aizawl	Aizawl, Mizoram	Rajiv Gandhi Stadium	25,000
Chennai City	Coimbatore, Tamil Nadu	Jawaharlal Nehru Stadium	35,000
Churchill Brothers	Vasco da Gama, Goa	Tilak Maidan Stadium	15,000
East Bengal	Kolkata, West Bengal	Salt Lake Stadium	85,000
Gokulam Kerala	Kozhikode, Kerala	EMS Stadium	80,000
Indian Arrows	Cuttack, Odisha; Bhubaneswar, Odisha	Barabati Stadium; Kalinga Stadium	60,000; 30,000
Minerva Punjab	Panchkula, Chandigarh	Tau Devi Lal Stadium	15,000
Mohun Bagan	Kolkata, West Bengal	Salt Lake Stadium	85,000
NEROCA	Imphal, Manipur	Khuman Lampak Main Stadium	40,000
Real Kashmir	Srinagar, Jammu and Kashmir	TRC Turf Ground	15,000
Shillong Lajong	Shillong, Meghalaya	Jawaharlal Nehru Stadium	35,000

=== Personnel and sponsorship ===
Team	Head coach	Kit manufacturer	Shirt sponsor
Aizawl	(India) Stanley Rozario	Vamos	NECS Limited
Chennai City	(Singapore) Akbar Nawas	Penalty	Nippon Paint
Churchill Brothers	(Romania) Petre Gigiu	Nivia	Churchill Group
East Bengal	(Spain) Alejandro Menéndez	Perf	Quess Corp
Gokulam Kerala	(India) Gift Raikhan	Kaizen	Aqualine
Indian Arrows	(India) Floyd Pinto	Nike	Hero
Minerva Punjab	(India) Sachin Badadhe	Astro	Apollo Tyres
Mohun Bagan	(India) Khalid Jamil	Shiv Naresh	None
NEROCA	(Spain) Manuel Retamero Fraile	Sqad Gear	Classic Group
Real Kashmir	(Scotland) David Robertson	Adidas	J&K Bank
Shillong Lajong	(India) Alison Kharsyntiew	Lotto	McDowell's No.1

=== Managerial changes ===
Team	Outgoing manager	Manner of departure	Position in table	Incoming manager	Date of appointment
Chennai City	(India) V. Soundararajan	Contract finished	Pre-season	(Singapore) Akbar Nawas	20 March 2018
Aizawl	(India) Santosh Kashyap	Contract finished	Pre-season	(India) Gift Raikhan	6 June 2018
NEROCA	(India) Gift Raikhan	Contract finished	Pre-season	(Spain) Manuel Retamero Fraile	6 July 2018
Indian Arrows	(Portugal) Luís Norton de Matos	Contract finished	Pre-season	(India) Floyd Pinto	25 July 2018
Minerva Punjab	(India) Khogen Singh	Contract finished	Pre-season	(Northern Ireland) Paul Munster	9 August 2018
East Bengal	(India) Khalid Jamil	Mutual consent	Pre-season	(Spain) Alejandro Menéndez	20 August 2018
Mohun Bagan	(India) Sankarlal Chakraborty	Resigned	6th(11 game in)	(India) Khalid Jamil	7 January 2019
Aizawl	(India) Gift Raikhan	Resigned	10th(11 game in)	(India) Stanley Rozario	9 January 2019
Minerva Punjab	(Northern Ireland) Paul Munster	Resigned	9th(16 game in)	(India) Sachin Badadhe(interim)	12 February 2019
Gokulam Kerala	(India) Bino George	Move To Technical Director	10th(18 game in)	(India) Gift Raikhan	28 February 2019

=== Foreign players ===
On 20 June 2018, it was decided by the All India Football Federation that the number of foreigners for each I-League club will be kept six as previous season. Asian player quota is abolished. Clubs can sign maximum six players of any nationality.

Indian Arrows cannot sign any foreign players as they are the AIFF developmental team.

Club	Foreigner 1	Foreigner 2	Foreigner 3	Foreigner 4	Foreigner 5	Foreigner 6
Aizawl	(Ivory Coast) Léonce Dodoz	(Liberia) Alfred Jaryan	(Liberia) Ansumana Kromah	(Nigeria) Kareem Omolaja	(Uganda) Richard Kasagga	
Chennai City	(Italy) Mauro Boerchio	(Slovakia) Jozef Kapláň	(Spain) Roberto Eslava	(Spain) Néstor Gordillo	(Spain) Pedro Manzi	(Spain) Sandro Rodríguez
Churchill Brothers	(Bosnia and Herzegovina) Nenad Novakovic	(Ivory Coast) Lorougnon Christ Remi	(Lebanon) Hussein Eldor	(Trinidad and Tobago) Willis Plaza	(Trinidad and Tobago) Anthony Wolfe	(Uganda) Khalid Aucho
East Bengal	(Costa Rica) Jhonny Acosta	(Mexico) Enrique Esqueda	(Senegal) Kassim Aidara	(Spain) Toni Dovale	(Spain) Borja Gómez Pérez	(Spain) Jaime Santos
Gokulam Kerala	(Ghana) Daniel Addo	(Haiti) Fabien Vorbe	(Nigeria) Ejiogu Emmanual	(Trinidad and Tobago) Andre Ettienne	(Trinidad and Tobago) Marcus Joseph	
Minerva Punjab	(Colombia) Jorge Caceido	(Ghana) Kalif Alhassan	(Spain) Juan Quero	(Syria) Mahmoud Amnah	(Ukraine) Roland Bilala	
Mohun Bagan	(Cameroon) Aser Pierrick Dipanda	(Egypt) Omar Elhussieny	(Haiti) Sony Norde	(Japan) Yuta Kinowaki	(Nigeria) Kingsley Obumneme	(Uganda) Henry Kisekka
NEROCA	(Australia) Aryn Williams	(Bhutan) Chencho Gyeltshen	(Equatorial Guinea) Eduardo Ferreira	(Japan) Katsumi Yusa	(Liberia) Varney Kallon	(Nigeria) Felix Chidi Odili
Real Kashmir	(Ghana) Abednego Tetteh	(Ivory Coast) Bazie Armand	(Ivory Coast) Gnohere Krizo	(Nigeria) Loveday Enyinnaya	(Scotland) Mason Robertson	(Zambia) Aaron Katebe
Shillong Lajong						

== League table ==
=== Standings ===
Pos	Team	Pld	W	D	L	GF	GA	GD	Pts	Qualification or relegation
1	Chennai City (C)	20	13	4	3	48	28	+20	43	Qualification for AFC Champions League preliminary round 1 (Note: If the league champions cannot qualify for the AFC Champions League group stage, they will enter the AFC Cup group stage.)
2	East Bengal	20	13	3	4	37	20	+17	42	
3	Real Kashmir	20	10	7	3	25	14	+11	37 (Note: The game between Minerva Punjab and Real Kashmir was rescheduled, but eventually it was not played and both teams were awarded a point.)	
4	Churchill Brothers	20	9	7	4	35	23	+12	34	
5	Mohun Bagan	20	8	5	7	27	28	−1	29	
6	NEROCA	20	7	5	8	27	26	+1	26	
7	Aizawl	20	6	6	8	27	28	−1	24	
8	Indian Arrows	20	6	3	11	19	28	−9	21	
9	Minerva Punjab	20	4	6	10	10	19	−9	18	
10	Gokulam Kerala	20	3	8	9	25	33	−8	17	
11	Shillong Lajong (R)	20	3	2	15	23	56	−33	11	Relegation to I-League 2nd Division (withdrew)

Source: I-league
Rules for classification: 1) points; 2) head-to-head points; 3) head-to-head goal difference; 4) goal difference; 5) number of goals scored; 6) drawing of lots
(C) Champions; (R) Relegated

=== Results ===
Home \ Away	AFC	CHE	CHU	EAB	GOK	INA	MIN	MOH	NER	REK	SHI
Aizawl	—	1–2	2–1	3–2	3–2	0–1	1–2	1–2	0–0	0–0	4–1
Chennai City	4–3	—	2–2	2–1	3–2	4–1	3–1	3–1	2–1	0–1	6–1
Churchill Brothers	4–1	3–2	—	1–2	3–1	2–1	2–0	1–1	2–1	1–1	4–2
East Bengal	1–1	1–2	1–1	—	3–1	1–0	0–1	3–2	2–1	1–1	5–0
Gokulam Kerala	1–3	2–3	1–1	1–2	—	1–1	1–0	1–1	2–1	1–1	3–1
Indian Arrows	0–0	0–2	0–1	1–2	1–0	—	2–1	0–2	2–3	2–2	1–0
Minerva Punjab	0–1	0–0	0–0	0–1	1–1	1–0	—	0–1	1–0	0–1	0–1
Mohun Bagan	2–2	1–1	0–3	0–2	2–2	1–3	2–0	—	1–0	1–2	2–0
NEROCA	0–0	3–3	2–1	0–2	1–1	3–0	0–0	2–1	—	2–3	3–2
Real Kashmir	1–0	1–0	0–0	1–2	1–0	2–0	– (Note: Both teams agreed to share one point each. Match was abandoned because of security issue.)	0–1	0–2	—	6–1
Shillong Lajong	2–1	2–4	3–2	1–3	1–1	0–3	2–2	2–3	1–2	0–1	—

Source: I-League
Legend: Blue = home team win; Yellow = draw; Red = away team win.

== Season statistics ==
=== Scoring ===
As of 9 March 2019

==== Top scorers ====
Rank	Player	Club	Goals
1	(Trinidad and Tobago) Willis Plaza	Churchill Brothers	21
1	(Spain) Pedro Manzi	Chennai City	21
3	(Mexico) Enrique Esqueda	East Bengal	9
3	(India) Jobby Justin	East Bengal	9
3	(Spain) Sandro Rodríguez	Chennai City	9
3	(Liberia) Ansumana Kromah	Aizawl	9
7	(Spain) Néstor Gordillo	Chennai City	8
7	(Cameroon) Aser Pierrick Dipanda	Mohun Bagan	8
7	(Nigeria) Felix Chidi Odili	NEROCA	8
7	(India) Laldanmawia Ralte	East Bengal	8
11	(Trinidad and Tobago) Marcus Joseph	Gokulam Kerala	7

==== Top Indian scorers ====
Rank	Player	Club	Goals
1	Jobby Justin	East Bengal	9
2	Laldanmawia Ralte	East Bengal	8
3	Lalkhawpuimawia	Aizawl	6
3	Phrangki Buam	Shillong Lajong	6
5	Samuel Kynshi	Shillong Lajong	5
6	Naorem Mahesh Singh	Shillong Lajong	4
6	Rohit Danu	Indian Arrows	4
6	Subhash Singh	NEROCA	4
9	Surchandra Singh	Real Kashmir	3
9	Samuel Lalmuanpuia	Shillong Lajong	3
9	Amarjit Singh Kiyam	Indian Arrows	3
9	Rahul Kannoly Praveen	Indian Arrows	3

==== Hat-tricks ====
Player	For	Against	Result	Date	Ref
(Spain) Pedro Manzi	Chennai City	Indian Arrows	4–1 (H)	26 October 2018	
(Trinidad and Tobago) Willis Plaza	Churchill Brothers	Shillong Lajong	4–2 (H)	15 November 2018	
(Spain) Pedro Manzi	Chennai City	Shillong Lajong	6–1 (H)	29 December 2018	
(Spain) Pedro Manzi	Chennai City	Gokulam Kerala	3–2 (H)	4 January 2019	
(Spain) Pedro Manzi	Chennai City	NEROCA	3–3 (A)	11 February 2019	
(India) Laldanmawia Ralte	East Bengal	Shillong Lajong	5–0 (H)	14 February 2019	

=== Cleansheets ===
As of 9 March 2019

Rank	Player	Club	Clean sheets
1	(India) Bilal Khan	Real Kashmir	9
2	(India) James Kithan	Churchill Brothers	5
2	(India) Prabhsukhan Singh Gill	Indian Arrows	5
2	(India) Rakshit Dagar	East Bengal	5
5	(India) Shilton Paul	Mohun Bagan	4
6	(India) Bhaskar Roy	Minerva Punjab	3
6	(India) Lalit Thapa	NEROCA	3
6	(India) Lalawmpuia	Aizawl	3
9	(Spain) Nauzet Santana	Chennai City	2
9	(Italy) Mauro Boerchio	NEROCA	2
9	(India) Arshdeep Singh	Minerva Punjab	2
9	(India) Shankar Roy	Mohun Bagan	2
9	(India) Gurpreet Singh Chabal	Aizawl	2

== Average home attendances ==
As of 9 March 2019

Team	GP	Cumulative	High	Low	Mean
East Bengal	10	272,699	64,867	9,952	27,270
NEROCA	10	191,383	29,932	6,135	19,139
Mohun Bagan	10	176,486	62,628	3,388	17,649
Gokulam Kerala	10	148,230	30,246	2,136	14,823
Real Kashmir	9	92,440	12,857	2,792	11,206
Chennai City	10	61,381	9,856	3,253	6,138
Minerva Punjab	10	56,239	8,591	3,470	5,624
Shillong Lajong	10	41,231	14,697	1,107	4,123
Churchill Brothers	10	33,867	3,796	2,417	3,387
Aizawl	10	28,801	5,324	863	2,881
Indian Arrows	10	16,497	4,520	100	1,640
Total	109	11,14,349	64,867	100	10,223

== Awards ==
=== Hero of the Match ===
Match	Hero of the Match		Match	Hero of the Match		Match	Hero of the Match	
Match	Player	Club	Match	Player	Club	Match	Player	Club
Match 1	(Spain) Pedro Manzi	Chennai City	Match 38	(India) Nagen Tamang	Real Kashmir	Match 75	(India) Jobby Justin	East Bengal
Match 2	(Mexico) Enrique Esqueda	East Bengal	Match 39	(India) Amarjit Singh Kiyam	Indian Arrows	Match 76	(Ivory Coast) Gnohere Krizo	Real Kashmir
Match 3	(India) Arjun Jayaraj	Gokulam Kerala	Match 40	(Uganda) Khalid Aucho	Churchill Brothers	Match 77	(India) Arnab Das Sharma	Gokulam Kerala
Match 4	(Nigeria) Philip Njoku	Minerva Punjab	Match 41	(India) Ningthoujam Pritam Singh	Gokulam Kerala	Match 78	(Trinidad and Tobago) Willis Plaza	Churchill Brothers
Match 5	(India) Naorem Mahesh Singh	Shillong Lajong	Match 42	(India) Alexander Romario	Chennai City	Match 79	(India) Boris Singh Thangjam	Indian Arrows
Match 6	(India) Bilal Khan	Real Kashmir	Match 43	(India) Laldanmawia Ralte	East Bengal	Match 80	(India) Lalrinchhana	Aizawl
Match 7	(India) Ronald Singh	NEROCA	Match 44	(Uganda) Henry Kisekka	Mohun Bagan	Match 81	(India) Rahim Ali	Indian Arrows
Match 8	(India) Jobby Justin	East Bengal	Match 45	(Spain) Jaime Santos	East Bengal	Match 82	(India) Naorem Mahesh Singh	Shillong Lajong
Match 9	(Bosnia and Herzegovina) Nenad Novaković	Churchill Brothers	Match 46	(India) Amarjit Singh Kiyam	Indian Arrows	Match 83	(Nigeria) Loveday Enyinnaya	Real Kashmir
Match 10	(Haiti) Sony Norde	Mohun Bagan	Match 47	(Spain) Roberto Eslava	Chennai City	Match 84	(Mexico) Enrique Esqueda	East Bengal
Match 11	(India) Ajith Kumar	Chennai City	Match 48	(India) Malemngamba Meitei	NEROCA	Match 85	(Spain) Sandro Rodríguez	Chennai City
Match 12	(India) Ashish Rai	Indian Arrows	Match 49	(Uganda) Henry Kisekka	Mohun Bagan	Match 86	(Bosnia and Herzegovina) Nenad Novaković	Churchill Brothers
Match 13	(India) Danish Farooq	Real Kashmir	Match 50	(Equatorial Guinea) Eduardo Ferreira	NEROCA	Match 87	(Spain) Pedro Manzi	Chennai City
Match 14	(India) Malemngamba Meitei	NEROCA	Match 51	(India) Jobby Justin	East Bengal	Match 88	(India) Laldanmawia Ralte	East Bengal
Match 15	(Ivory Coast) Lancine Touré	Minerva Punjab	Match 52	(Liberia) Alfred Jaryan	Aizawl	Match 89	(Uganda) Henry Kisekka	Mohun Bagan
Match 16	(Cameroon) Aser Pierrick Dipanda	Mohun Bagan	Match 53	(Spain) Pedro Manzi	Chennai City	Match 90	(Trinidad and Tobago) Marcus Joseph	Gokulam Kerala
Match 17	(Nigeria) Felix Chidi Odili	NEROCA	Match 54	(India) Nickson Castanha	Churchill Brothers	Match 91	(India) Lalrindika Ralte	East Bengal
Match 18	(India) Gani Nigam	Gokulam Kerala	Match 55	(India) Subhash Singh	NEROCA	Match 92	match not held	
Match 19	(India) Edwin Sydney Vanspaul	Chennai City	Match 56	(Spain) Pedro Manzi	Chennai City	Match 93	(Spain) Pedro Manzi	Chennai City
Match 20	(Trinidad and Tobago) Willis Plaza	Churchill Brothers	Match 57	(India) Anwar Ali	Indian Arrows	Match 94	(India) Naorem Mahesh Singh	Shillong Lajong
Match 21	(India) Kabir Thaufiq	Chennai City	Match 58	(Trinidad and Tobago) Anthony Wolfe	Churchill Brothers	Match 95	(Spain) Juan Quero	Minerva Punjab
Match 22	(India) Rajesh S	Gokulam Kerala	Match 59	(Scotland) Mason Robertson	Real Kashmir	Match 96	(India) Suresh Singh Wangjam	Indian Arrows
Match 23	(Cameroon) Aser Pierrick Dipanda	Mohun Bagan	Match 60	(India) Jobby Justin	East Bengal	Match 97	(Spain) Néstor Gordillo	Chennai City
Match 24	(India) Novin Gurung	Shillong Lajong	Match 61	(Egypt) Omar Elhussieny	Mohun Bagan	Match 98	(Ivory Coast) Léonce Dodoz	Aizawl
Match 25	(Ivory Coast) Léonce Dodoz Zikahi	Aizawl	Match 62	(The Gambia) Dawda Ceesay	Churchill Brothers	Match 99	(Mexico) Enrique Esqueda	East Bengal
Match 26	(Spain) Néstor Gordillo	Chennai City	Match 63	(Liberia) Alfred Jaryan	Aizawl	Match 100	(India) Lalkhawpuimawia	Aizawl
Match 27	(Ivory Coast) Bazie Armand	Real Kashmir	Match 64	(India) Shilton Paul	Mohun Bagan	Match 101	(India) Rahul Kannoly Praveen	Indian Arrows
Match 28	(Trinidad and Tobago) Willis Plaza	Churchill Brothers	Match 65	(India) Lalengmawia	Indian Arrows	Match 102	(Trinidad and Tobago) Willis Plaza	Churchill Brothers
Match 29	(India) Arjun Jayaraj	Gokulam Kerala	Match 66	(India) Alexander Romario	Chennai City	Match 103	(India) Laldanmawia Ralte	East Bengal
Match 30	(Nigeria) Philip Njoku	Minerva Punjab	Match 67	(Spain) Borja Gómez Pérez	East Bengal	Match 104	(Ghana) Daniel Addo	Gokulam Kerala
Match 31	(Haiti) Sony Norde	Mohun Bagan	Match 68	(Spain) Sandro Rodríguez	Chennai City	Match 105	(India) Paul Ramfangzauva	Aizawl
Match 32	(India) Subhash Singh	NEROCA	Match 69	(Trinidad and Tobago) Marcus Joseph	Gokulam Kerala	Match 106	(India) Phrangki Buam	Shillong Lajong
Match 33	(Ghana) William Opoku	Minerva Punjab	Match 70	(India) Phurba Lachenpa	Shillong Lajong	Match 107	(India) Lalawmpuia	Aizawl
Match 34	(Ivory Coast) Bazie Armand	Real Kashmir	Match 71	(Trinidad and Tobago) Willis Plaza	Churchill Brothers	Match 108	(India) Danish Farooq	Real Kashmir
Match 35	(Nigeria) Felix Chidi Odili	NEROCA	Match 72	(India) Phurba Lachenpa	Shillong Lajong	Match 109	(India) Laldanmawia Ralte	East Bengal
Match 36	(India) Jobby Justin	East Bengal	Match 73	(Trinidad and Tobago) Willis Plaza	Churchill Brothers	Match 110	(India) Gaurav Bora	Chennai City
Match 37	(India) Israil Gurung	Churchill Brothers	Match 74	(India) Malemngamba Meitei	NEROCA			

== See also ==
- 2018–19 Indian Super League
