= FC Pune City =

Former Indian association football club based in Pune

Pune City
- Full name: FC Pune City
- Nickname: The Stallions
- Short name: FCPC
- Founded: 2014; 12 years ago
- Dissolved: 2019; 7 years ago
- Ground: Shree Shiv Chhatrapati Sports Complex
- Capacity: 11,900
- Owner: Wadhawan Group
- League: Indian Super League
Home colours	Away colours	Third colours

Football Club Pune City was an Indian professional football club based in Pune, Maharashtra, which last participated in the Indian Super League, the top flight of Indian football league system, under licence from AIFF. The club was founded in 2014 during the inaugural season of the Indian Super League, with aims to provide stimulus to the growth and development of football in the state of Maharashtra and to participate in the inaugural season of the Indian Super League.

FC Pune City was owned by Rajesh Wadhawan Group, its promoters Mr. Kapil Wadhawan and Mr. Dheeraj Wadhawan and actor Arjun Kapoor. The club was dissolved in 2019 due to financial and technical difficulties. They were replaced in the Indian Super League by Hyderabad FC.

== History ==
=== Inception ===
On 13 April 2014, it was announced that Salman Khan and the Wadhawan Group had won the bidding for the Pune franchise. Later due to issues of sponsorships and endorsements, Salman Khan opted to move out from FC Pune City. Serie A's ACF Fiorentina came on board as technical partners while Bollywood star Hrithik Roshan joined in as the co-owner of the club in its first year of existence.

=== Season 1 (2014) ===
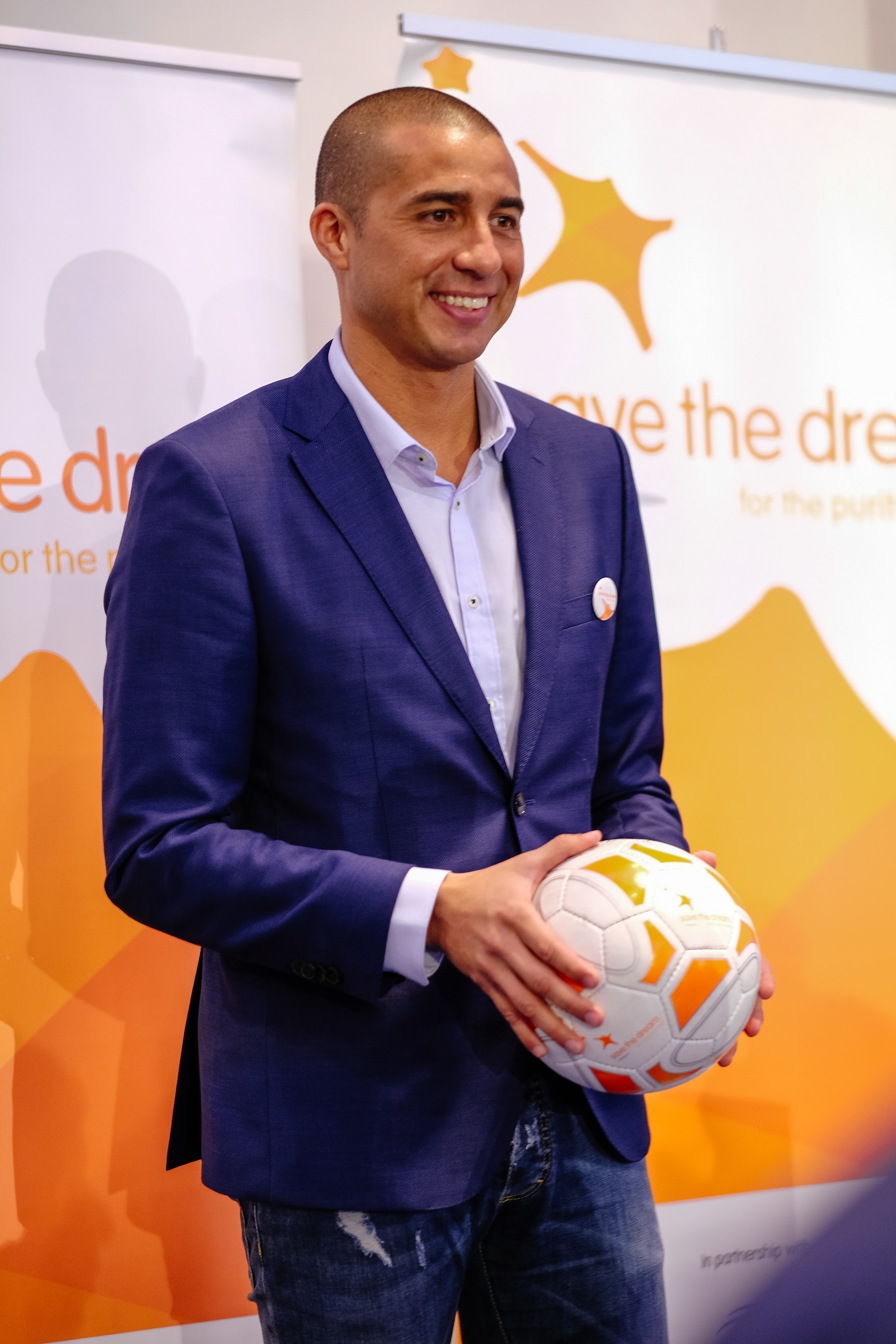
David Trezeguet, the club's first marquee player.

After successfully winning the bid for Pune franchise, The Rajesh Wadhawan Group on 30 July 2014, the club revealed its identity. Club CEO Gaurav Modwel launched the team name, logo and brand identity at an event. They also announced their head coach in Franco Colomba and marquee player in French football legend David Trezeguet.

The club bolstered its squad with the signing of Kostas Katsouranis in September 2014, as he became the first player in Indian Super League to have played in the FIFA World Cup 2014. John Goossens was among other notable signings for the club. For pre-season, the club traveled to Florence.

The team played their first Indian Super League match on 14 October 2014, away to Delhi Dynamos FC at the Jawaharlal Nehru Stadium, New Delhi in a 0–0 draw. On 18 October 2014 at DY Patil Stadium in Mumbai with an attendance of 28,000, FC Pune City had their first loss of the ISL with a 0–5 scoreline to Mumbai City FC.

In their first home game on 26 October 2014 at the Shree Shiv Chhatrapati Sports Complex, FC Pune City beat FC Goa 2–0 in front of a packed stadium to mark their home debut with a win. Kostas Katsouranis and Captain David Trezeguet scored a goal each.

In their second home fixture, the club lost 1–2 to Kerala Blasters despite David Trezeguet scoring the first goal for FC Pune City in the 15th minute. Playing their third home game on the trot against NorthEast United FC, John Goossens’ 88th-minute header gave FC Pune City a 1–0 win, second in three matches at home.

On 7 November 2014, the club took on Atlético de Kolkata in Kolkata. FC Pune City won 3–1, which ended ATK's unbeaten run. Dudu Omagbemi scored the first goal, Kostas Katsouranis scored the second goal, picking up the Hero of the Match award, while Davide Colomba scored the third goal with a deflected free-kick.

During the match, John Goossens suffered a serious injury after a collision with his team's goalkeeper Arindam Bhattacharya. This injury brought a premature end to Goossens’ stint with FC Pune City for the rest of the season.

After the high against ATK, FC Pune City managed just one win (Mumbai City FC), with three draws (Chennaiyin FC, NorthEast United, Atlético de Kolkata) and four losses (Chennaiyin FC, FC Goa, Delhi Dynamos & Kerala Blasters) which pushed the team down to sixth place, missing out on qualifying for the knockout stage.

=== Season 2 (2015) ===
In 2015, the club announced English football legend David Platt as the new head coach. A few weeks later, Adrian Mutu was announced as the marquee player alongside Ivory Coast and Tottenham Hotspur midfielder Didier Zokora. On 21 March 2015, FC Pune City announced that they had signed Gouramangi Singh. FC Pune City opened their season with a 3–1 win over Mumbai City FC in the Maharashtra Derby on 5 October 2015 at home. Turkish midfielder Tuncay scored twice, while Israil Gurung scored once in the win.

They played their second game of the season at home against NorthEast United FC. An own goal from the North East player Ralte secured the victory for home side.

The third game they played was against Delhi Dynamos FC on 14 October. FC Pune City lost the game 1–2 with Kalu Uche being the sole scorer for FC Pune City. This game saw Jackichand Singh and Eugeneson Lyngdoh making their ISL debut.

Playing their fourth consecutive home game, the David Platt managed side registered a 1–0 win over defending champions Atletico De Kolkata. Jackichand Singh's goal in the second minute of the match was enough to put the home side on top of the table at the end of the match.

In their next match against Chennaiyin FC, FC Pune City was handed a 1–2 defeat with Kalu Uche reducing the home team's lead in the 75th minute. Back home, FC Pune City came down from a goal to win 3–2 against Kerala Blasters. Mohammed Rafi scored a goal in the first minute for Kerala Blasters, the fastest goal ever in the history of the Hero Indian Super League (ISL). He scored his second in the 30th minute but it was Kalu Uche’s brace for the hosts (16th and 23rd ). In the 72nd minute, Tuncay scored the winner for the home team.

This remained the last win for the Didier Zokora-led side. They managed three draws and five losses in the next eight matches putting them in the 7th place.

=== Season 3 (2016) ===
Before the start of the season, the club announced its takeover of I-League club Pune FC's academy and an investment to upgrade the existing infrastructure and training facilities.

Two weeks in to the season, FC Pune City's Academy product Md. Ashique Kuruniyan got a training stint at La Liga club Villarreal and play for its third team on loan.

For season three, FC Pune City brought in Barcelona and Iceland legend Eiður Guðjohnsen as their marquee player. But during a pre-season training session, Guðjohnsen picked up an injury to end his stint with the club even before it could start. Former Liverpool midfielder Momo Sissoko was roped in as the new marquee player as ISL winning coach, Antonio Habas joined the club as the new head coach.

During the start of the season, FC Pune City registered just two wins (2–1 against FC Goa, 2–1 against ATK) in eight matches, losing their season opener against Mumbai City FC by 1–0 and two other games and drawing three other fixtures. With just two wins (1–0 against Mumbai City FC, 4–3 against Delhi Dynamos) in their next six fixtures and three losses and a drawn game put the club in sixth position, missing out on yet another chance to qualify for the knockout stages.

=== Season 4 (2017–18) ===
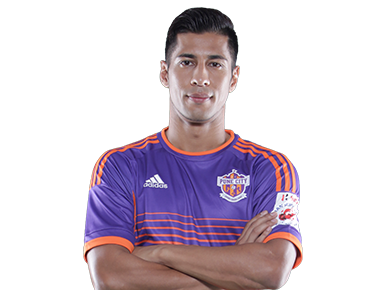
Arata Izumi with Pune City in 2017

FC Pune City announced their participation in the inaugural Indian Women's League 2017. Starting from 28 January 2017 until 14 February 2017, the League had five other teams participating alongside FC Pune City in the final round to be held in New Delhi.

The women's team in the last one year had won the Late Lance Naik Mohan Goswamy Memorial All India Tournament 2016 in Uttarakhand, Guru Tej Bahadur Football Tournament and Mayor's Cup in Pune and remained unbeaten in the Pune District Football Association (PDFA) Women's League on their way to winning the title. In both Guru Tej Bahadur Football Tournament and PDFA Women's League, this side did not concede a single goal.

In July 2017, they beat United Poona SA 3–0 in the finals of WIFA Women's Championship 2017. A brace by Senorita added to Muriel Adam's goal ensured the win for the outfit in the all-Pune finals played at Cooperage, Mumbai.

In May, FC Pune City announced a strategic alliance with Mizoram's Chanmari Football Club, based in Aizawl. The club participates in the Mizoram Premier League. The partnership involved close co-operation between the first teams, academies, youth development, training support and scouting projects, as well as the opportunity for Chanmari FC players to represent FC Pune City during their careers. As part of the association, FC Pune City helped the Aizawl-based club build a youth structure, providing them with coaches and training equipment.

A few months later in June, FC Pune City's U-19 team won the 121st U-19 IFA Shield tournament in its debut season.

A 3–0 win over home team and multiple time champions Mohun Bagan capped their run in the century-old tournament that concluded on Sunday. FC Pune City U-19 team was placed in Group B along with the U-19 teams of Tata Football Academy, Mohun Bagan, Minerva Punjab. In their run to finals, FC Pune City U-19 team beat Tata Football Academy 1–0. Mohun Bagan 1–0, Minerva Punjab 3–1 before handing AIFF U-19 side 6–5 defeat in a penalty shootout in the semifinal.

Come July, the first player draft in Indian Super League took place. FC Pune City signed Kean Lewis, Isaac Vanmalsawma, Nim Dorjee Tamang and Wayne Vaz, and retained the services of the goal-keeper Vishal Kaith.

FC Pune City also signed the golden boot winner of the previous year's ISL, Marcelinho. Forward Emiliano Alfaro joined the ranks from NorthEast United FC. Bolstering the midfield, FC Pune City also signed Marcos Tebar from Delhi Dynamos FC and brought back Jonathan Lucca from last season who alongside Diego Carlos and Robertino Pugliara form the midfield. Rafa Lopez and Damir Grgic were signed to strengthen the defense.

=== Season 5 (2018) ===
Pune City's pre-season began with hosting the Corporate Super Cup. Starting from 9 June 2018 until 22 July, the Corporate Super Cup saw more than 20 teams participating, with Team FIN IQ winning the CSC 2018 trophy.

The club also announced the retention of Adil Khan, Emiliano Alfaro, Marko Stankovic, Diego Carlos, Rohit Kumar, Lalchhuanmawia, Gurtej Singh and Kamaljit Singh, as well signing new players like Alwyn George, Shankar Sampingiraj, Gabriel Fernandes, Keenan Almeida, Nikhil Poojari, Jonathan Vila and Martin Diaz to fill in for the departures of Jonatan Lucca and Rafa Lopez Gomez. The Stallions also signed one of India's notable strikers, Robin Singh, ex- Manchester City and Leicester City center back Matt Mills and Hero Indian Super League top goalscorer, Iain Hume. The Stallions also signed Spanish coach Miguel Angel Portugal, who had Hero Indian Super League experience having coached Delhi Dynamos the previous season. With the core of the previous team still in place and with the added reinforcements, the Stallions were ready to begin their season 5 campaign.

The Stallions began their pre-season at Goa, participating in the AWES Cup. They crashed out of the tournament in the group stages after a poor showing.

Before the season began, the club announced the signing of wing-back Ashutosh Mehta, who joined as a replacement for an injured Keenan Almeida. He had previously played at ATK and Mumbai City FC.

FC Pune City started their season 5 campaign with away games at Delhi Dynamos and Mumbai City FC. Diego Carlos scored FC Pune City's first goal of season 5 of the Hero Indian Super League. The club registered only one win and two draws in their first nine games, and as a result of this poor showing in the beginning of the season, the club parted ways with coach Miguel Angel Portugal and appointed Technical Director Pradhyum Reddy as the interim coach. The Stallions decided to loan forward Emiliano Alfaro to ATK for the remainder of the season. This paved the way for Iain Hume to play for FC Pune City, as he recovered from his knee injury before the December break.

FC Pune City appointed Englishman Phil Brown in the winter break. Phil Brown had substantial experience in England and was looking to manage clubs abroad.

The Englishman's first match as FC Pune City head coach was a 2–1 away win against Chennaiyin FC. This was followed by a draw against ATK at home and a victory over Jamshedpur FC at Jamshedpur. FC Pune City finished their Hero Indian Super League season 5 campaign with a 2–1 win against Mumbai City FC. The Stallions finished their season in seventh place, missing out on a direct qualification to the Hero Super Cup. Marcelo Pereira was the club's highest goalscorer, with 6 goals.

=== Dissolution and controversies ===
In 2019, Pune City tried to sign a player from Chennai City FC illegally (Spaniard Néstor Gordillo), all while the player still had a contract with Chennai City. All India Football Federation came down heavy on Pune City as they were handed a two-window transfer ban, a fine of ₹50 lakhs and a two-year ban from participating in any AFC tournaments. Within months of the incident, the club was dissolved and the stakes were sold. Subsequently, the new owners shifted base from Pune to the southern city of Hyderabad as Hyderabad FC.

Before shutting down in 2019 several Pune City Players, including Indian international Ashique Kuruniyan and Canadian Iain Hume, came out with a statement that claimed that they hadn't received their salary from the management for the entire season. After this, the All India Football Federation got involved and sought out the salary due issues with the players and the club.

== Support and rivalry ==
=== Supporters ===
The club had a group of supporters called the "Orange Army".

=== Rivalries ===
FC Pune City and Mumbai City FC were the only 2 clubs in the Indian Super League from a single state, which created an elite rivalry between the two, one that was as the Maha-Derby.

== Reserves and academy ==
On 26 August 2016, it was announced that FC Pune City had purchased the Pune F.C. Academy and rebranded it under their name. At the same time, the team unveiled their youth development plans which included fielding teams in the Youth League U18 and U15 leagues, as well as the Subroto Cup and Pune Football League.

In 2017, each of FC Pune City's grassroots teams had won a trophy, which included, the U-11, U-14, U-16, and U-18 teams as well as the women's team. The U-11 team won the Adidas Uprising tournament, the U-14 team won the SRPF tournament, the U-16 team won the Goa Elite Super Cup and the U-18 team won the IFA Shield, beating Mohun Bagan in the finals. FC Pune City was the only ISL team participating in the tournament. The reserve team has also participated in the I-League 2nd Division. Spanish manager José Carlos Hevia served as head of the club's academy and reserve team.

=== Honours of FC Pune City (Reserves) ===
- IFA Shield
  - Winners (1): 2017
- Bandodkar Gold Trophy
  - Winners (1): 2016
- Youth League U18
  - Runners-up (1): 2018–19

== Club crest and kits ==
The FC Pune City crest is also inspired by Shivaji. The fort within the shield, the horses, and the flag represent a strong defensive and offensive line-up. The color Orange is synonymous with Shivaji, whilst the purple color and the flower are identities that have been pivotal in the all-around symbolism of the club.

=== Kit manufacturers and shirt sponsors ===
Period	Kit manufacturer	Shirt sponsor
2014–2015	Dida	DHFL Pramerica
2015–2016	Adidas	Fair and Handsome
2016–2017	Adidas	DHFL
2017–2018	Adidas	Suzuki Gixxer
2018–2019	SIX5SIX	Suzuki Gixxer

== Stadium ==
=== Home ground ===
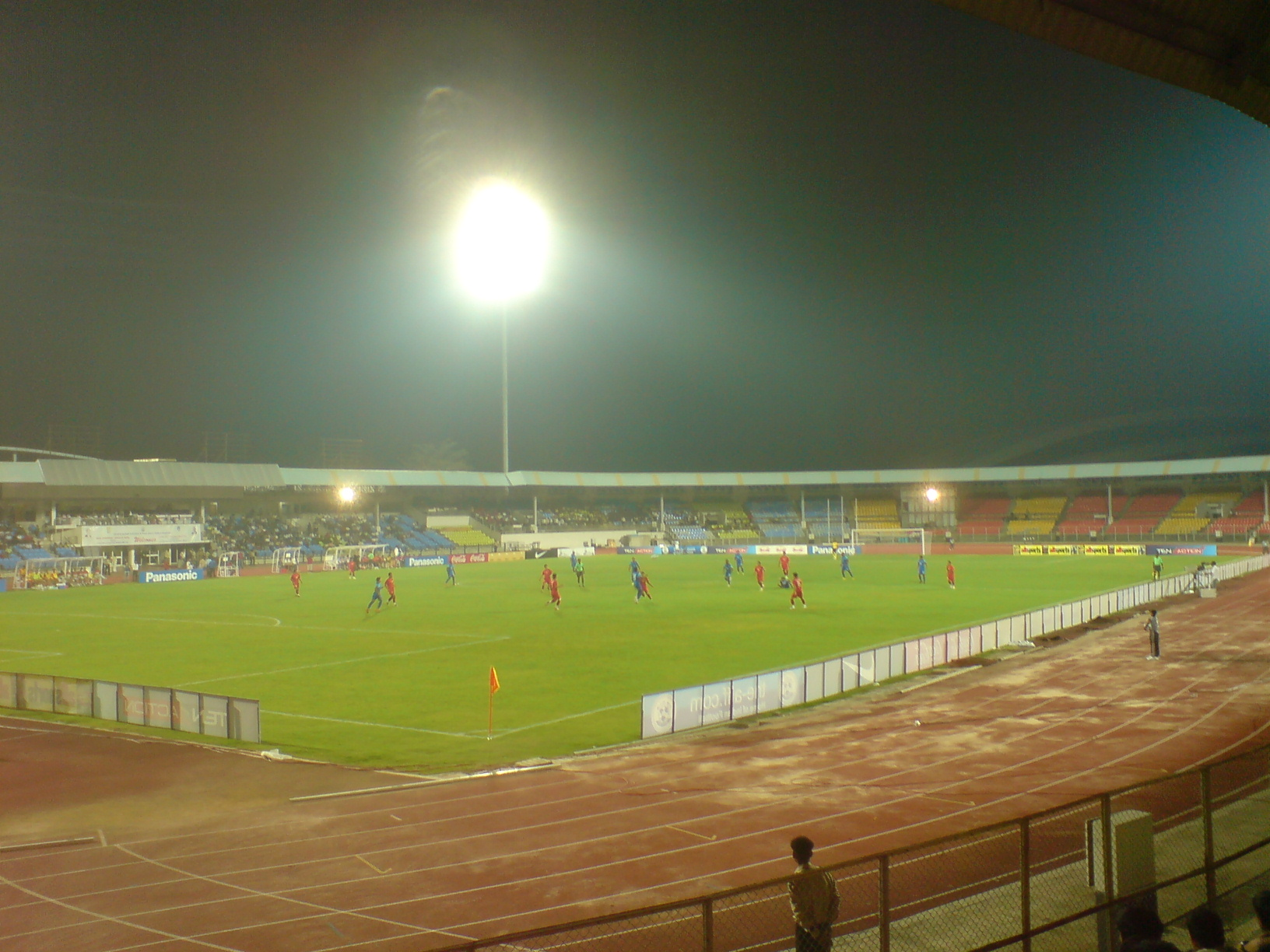
Shree Shiv Chhatrapati Sports Complex in Balewadi, Pune, used as home ground of Pune City for Indian Super League matches.

FC Pune City played its home matches at the Shree Shiv Chhatrapati Sports Complex, Balewadi, Pune. The pitch at the Shree Shiv Chhatrapati Sports Complex is of natural grass and its capacity for the Indian Super League matches is 9,210.

=== Training facilities ===
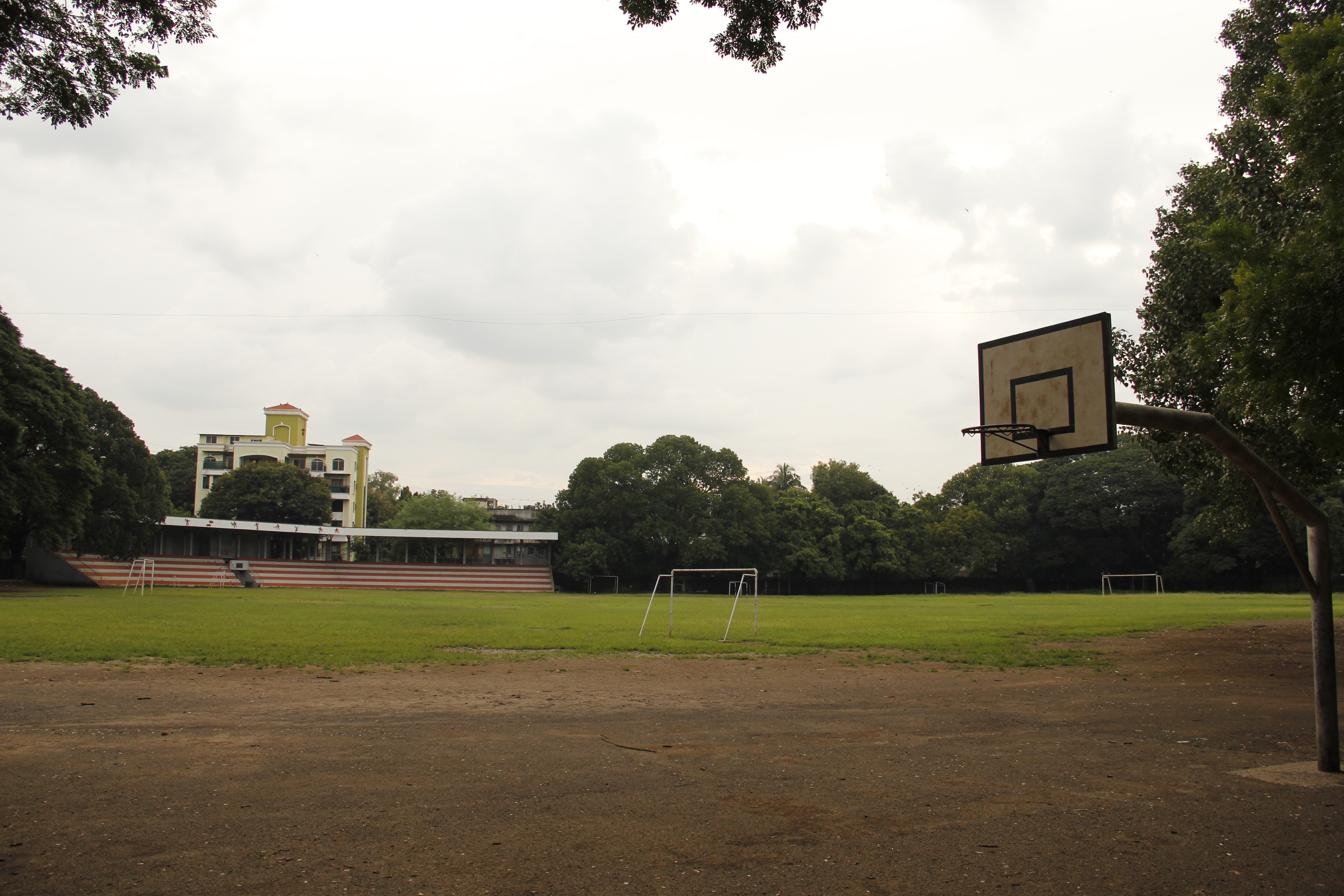
St. Vincent's High School football ground in Pune.

FC Pune City-owned two training grounds in the city of Pune. The Senior Team trained at the state of the art FC Pune City Training Facility which is situated at Dharawli, Pirangut whilst the Youth Teams trained at the Training Pitches in Mamurdi. Both facilities have natural grass pitches.

The development squads of FC Pune City trained at the St. Vincent's High School football ground, which is located in Pune.

== Notable players ==
- Players who have represented their nations at the highest level.

Name	Country
Kostas Katsouranis	Greece
Krisztián Vadócz	Hungary
Apoula Edel	Armenia
Andrés González	Colombia
David Trezeguet	France
Adrian Mutu	Romania
Saïdou Panandétiguiri	Burkina Faso
Yendrick Ruiz	Costa Rica
Didier Zokora	Ivory Coast
Mohamed Sissoko	Mali
Iván Bolado	Equatorial Guinea
Eduardo Ferreira	Equatorial Guinea
Dramane Traoré	Mali
Kalu Uche	Nigeria
Nicky Shorey	England
Tuncay Şanlı	Turkey
Iain Hume	Canada
Marko Stanković	Austria

== Team records ==
=== Seasons ===
As of 27 August 2019

Year	ISL Regular season								Finals	Super Cup	League Top Scorer(s)	
Year	P	W	D	L	GF	GA	Pts	Pos.	Finals	Super Cup	Player(s)	Goals
2014	14	4	4	6	12	17	16	6th	DNQ	Did not exist	(Greece) Kostas Katsouranis	4
2015	14	4	3	7	17	23	15	7th	DNQ	Did not exist	(Nigeria) Kalu Uche (Romania) Adrian Mutu	4
2016	14	4	4	6	13	16	16	6th	DNQ	Did not exist	(Mexico) Aníbal Zurdo	5
2017–18	18	9	3	6	30	21	30	4th	Semi Finals	Round of 16	(Uruguay) Emiliano Alfaro	9
2018–19*	18	6	4	8	24	30	22	7th	DNQ	Round of 16	(Brazil) Marcelinho	6

*Last professional season

== Managerial history ==
As of 27 August 2019

Name	Nationality	From	To	P	W	D	L	GF	GA	Win%
Franco Colomba	Italy	22 June 2014	20 December 2014	14	4	4	6	12	17	28.57
David Platt	England	2 June 2015	20 December 2015	14	4	3	7	17	23	28.57
Antonio López Habas	Spain	25 April 2016	15 September 2017	14	4	4	6	13	16	28.57
Miguel Martinez Gonzalez (Caretaker)	Spain	3 October 2016	3 October 2016	1	0	0	1	0	1	0.00
Ranko Popović	Serbia	25 September 2017	31 May 2018	18	9	3	6	30	21	50.00
Miguel Ángel Portugal	Spain	1 June 2018	26 October 2018	3	0	1	2	1	6	0.00
Pradhyum Reddy (Interim-Manager)	India	26 October 2018	24 December 2018	9	3	1	5	10	15	33.33
Phil Brown	England	24 December 2018	27 August 2019	7	3	3	1	14	13	42.86
Marcos Paqueta	Brazil	1 June 2018	27 August 2018	0	0	0	0	0	0	0.00

== Affiliated clubs ==
The following clubs were formerly affiliated with FC Pune City:

- (Italy) ACF Fiorentina (2014–2017)
- (India) Chanmari FC (2017–2018)

== Honours ==
- IFA Shield
  - Winners (1): 2017
- Bandodkar Gold Trophy
  - Winners (1): 2016

== Partnership ==
- India On Track

In 2015, FC Pune City entered into the partnership with India On Track for having the technical support and advices. The aim of the partnership is to manage various aspects of the franchise including technical tie-ups, recruitment of domestic and international players, technical staff, creating and implementing the franchise's grassroots and youth development strategy as well as developing their commercial strategy.

- Chanmari FC

In May 2017, FC Pune City formed a partnership with the Mizoram Premier League club Chanmari FC. As part of the association, FC Pune City helped the Aizawl-based club building youth structure by providing them with coaches and training equipments.

== See also ==
- List of FC Pune City players
- List of football clubs in Maharashtra
- Sports in Maharashtra
- FC Pune City (women)
- FC Pune City Academy
