= Sandro Rodríguez =

Spanish footballer

Personal information
- Full name: Sandro Rodríguez Felipe
- Date of birth: 26 May 1990 (age 36)
- Place of birth: Santa Cruz de Tenerife, Spain
- Position: Midfielder

Youth career
- UD Geneto
- CD Sobradillo
- Tenerife

Senior career*
Years	Team	Apps	(Gls)
2009–2012	Tenerife B	68	(16)
2012–2014	Tenerife	2	(0)
2012–2013	→ Marino (loan)	36	(5)
2014	Las Palmas B	11	(0)
2014–2015	Las Palmas C		
2015–2018	Ibarra	92	(27)
2018–2020	Chennai City	20	(9)
- * Club domestic league appearances and goals

Sandro Rodríguez Felipe (born 26 May 1990) is a Spanish professional footballer who last played for Indian I-League side Chennai City as a midfielder.

== Club career ==
Born in Tenerife, Rodríguez represented UD Geneto and CD Sobradillo as a youth before joining the academy of CD Tenerife. In September 2009, he made his debut for the reserves, in an away match against CD Puertollano in Tercera División. On 15 April 2012, he made his debut for the senior team in a 1–1 draw against CD Lugo in Segunda División B.

On 3 August 2012, Rodríguez was loaned out to fellow league club CD Marino for the upcoming season. On 20 January 2014, he signed for UD Las Palmas B.

After spending three seasons with UD Ibarra in Tercera, Rodríguez moved abroad for the first time in his career and joined Indian club Chennai City on 2 May 2018. On 26 October, he made his debut in a 4–1 triumph over Indian Arrows. On 1 November, he scored his first goal for the club in a 2–2 draw against Churchill Brothers.

== Honours ==
=== Club ===
Chennai City FC

- I-League: 2018–19
