= Akbar Nawas =

Singaporean football coach

Personal information
- Full name: Mohamad Akbar Bin Abdul Nawas
- Date of birth: 28 November 1975 (age 50)
- Place of birth: Singapore

Team information
- Current team: Hougang United (Head Coach)

Senior career*
Years	Team	Apps	(Gls)
1998–1999	Marine Castle United		

Managerial career
- 2015: Tampines Rovers U21
- 2015: Tampines Rovers (assistant)
- 2016–2017: Tampines Rovers
- 2017–2018: Global Cebu
- 2018–2020: Chennai City
- 2021–2022: Balestier Khalsa
- 2022–2023: Udon Thani
- 2022–2023: Udon Thani (sporting director)
- 2023–2024: Nakhon Pathom United
- 2025: Tampines Rovers
- 2025–: Hougang United
- * Club domestic league appearances and goals

Mohamad Akbar Bin Abdul Nawas, also known as Akbar Nawas (born 28 November 1975), is a Singaporean football coach who is currently the Head Coach of Singapore Premier League club Hougang United.

Nawas has an advanced diploma in business administration from University of Wales and has finished his degree in business administration and marketing from the same university. Nawas mostly prefers to use the 4-1-3-2 formation throughout his entire time as a coach.

In 2014, Nawas was the assistant coach to the technical director and coach in the Singapore U21 and at the same time, the youth development manager for the Football Association of Singapore from 2011 to 2014. While doing his share of work in the FAS, Nawas assisted LionsXII head coach, Fandi Ahmad in training and as a match analyst for the LionsXIi in pre-season. (predominantly a U23 team with ten senior players, playing in the Malaysia Super League)

In 2015, Nawas was appointed the assistant coach of Tampines Rovers and the head coach for the Tampines Rovers U21 Reserve team who emerged as champions in the Reserve League.

== Early life ==
As a child, football became the life of Nawas. At the age of 10, he played in the junior and senior level of the Macpherson Primary School from 1985 to 1987. And from 1988 to 1992, Nawas played in the "C" and "B" Divisions for Macpherson Secondary School.

Nawas captained the Professional Club side Trywhitt Under-19 side to third Place. He also played for the Singapore Under-19 and professional club side Trywhitt senior team. As a football player, Nawas was called up to play for the Singapore Pre–Olympic team and the national team for Under 23s and U19s.

== Club career ==
From 1998 to 1999, Nawas played for Marine Castle United in the top flight league in Singapore, the S.League. Nawas was then called up for training with the National "A" team for the Dunhill Cup after his stint with Marine Castle United. In 1999, he had an ACL operation and stopped playing competitive football.

He joined the compulsory military service in 1996 and played football in the Police Force Home team. In 1995, Nawas started to play professionally in the Singapore Football Professional teams and he was called up for the Singapore Pre-Olympic and Jakarta Squad team respectively.

== Managerial career ==
=== Tampines Rovers ===
In 2015, Nawas first joined as the assistant coach for Tampines Rovers under V. Sundramoorthy. On 27 May 2016, as V. Sundramoorthy was appointed the head coach of Singapore national football team, Nawas was the promoted to head coach of Tampines Rovers for the 2016 season and led the team to the runners up position in the League. The team scored 52 goals in total, of which 30 goals in 12 games were scored in the second half of the season when Nawas took over. He also led Tampines to the 2016 Singapore Cup Final and emerged as runners-up and was a semi-finalist in the 2016 Singapore League Cup, where he introduced the reserve team players as most of the players from the first team were away with the national team. They lost to eventual winners Albirex Niigata (S) in the League Cup semi-finals. Nawas' expertise is the attacking approach in football; this helped Tampines Rovers team to dominate possession in almost every game during his term as head coach and reduced the gap of seven points to only one point, guiding the team from fourth place to second place in the Singapore League. He led the club to a quarterfinal finish at the 2016 AFC Cup and was knocked out of the competition by eventual runners-up Bengaluru. Tampines Rovers finished as runners-up in the 2016 S. League season and the club was eligible to participate in the 2017 AFC Champions League qualifying play-offs. They lose against Filipino club, Global FC in their first match thus failing to advance in the play-offs. Nawas resigned in January 2017.

=== Global Cebu ===
In May 2017, it was reported that Nawas joined Global Cebu, one of the top football clubs in the Philippines, who participated in the inaugural season of the national professional Philippines Football League, Nawas became the technical consultant and later on was offered the post of a head coach, the first Singaporean coach to handle a football team from the Philippines.

Led by Nawas, Global Cebu made history as the first Philippines football club to reach the finals of the Singapore Cup. This is also a second successive Cup final for Nawas. In the 2017 Singapore Cup finals, they drew 2–2 but lost on penalties shoot out. He then helped the club in their 2017 AFC Cup group stage campaign with club like Johor Darul Ta'zim, Boeung Ket Angkor and Magwe. The club manage to get 5 wins and 1 lost in the group and ended up as group leaders which see them face against Home United in the Zonal semi-finals but they lost 5–4 on aggregate.

=== Chennai City ===
In March 2018, he joined I-League side Chennai City as head coach. Nawas, who was the former technical consultant of the club, takes over as the head coach from V.Soundararajan after the team had finished a disappointing eighth position in the 2017–18 I-League. In his first full season, he helped Chennai City overcome all odds to win the 2018–19 I-League season. Akbar was named the best coach at the I-League awards on 20 March 2019. He gained lots of praise and recognition for his work with the team, and his contract was renewed for the 2019–20 season. On 26 October 2020, Nawas parted ways with the club by mutual consent in which countrymen, Satyasagara took over the helms.

=== Balestier Khalsa ===
On 22 October 2021, Akbar was announced as the head coach of Balestier Khalsa, succeeding Marko Kraljevic, who left a week prior. According to a club statement, Akbar has penned a two-year contract "worth more than S$170,000”. However, less than 1 year into the contract, Akbar would tender his resignation, and join Thai League 2 side Udon Thani, less than a week after a record 6–1 win against Hougang United.

==== Controversy ====
It was revealed that his time at Balestier Khalsa turn sour when he was made to become the kit man and needing to wash the training bibs after the team training at the St Wilfrid's Sports Complex. Nawas, along with assistant coach, Razif Ariff would then head back to Toa Payoh Stadium and get the bibs washed and dried following the training session, all because the club did not have a full-time kit manager who would look after the team's training needs.

=== Udon Thani ===
On 1 September 2022, Nawas joined Thai League 2 club, Udon Thani. It was reported that Nawas will initially act as the club's technical director, while also serving as a head coach. On 18 December 2023, Nawas stepped down as head coach to become the sporting director of the club while Mavi Lopes took over the head coach position. On 17 February 2023, Nawas was appointed as the club head coach again while also keeping his job as the club sporting director.

=== Nakhon Pathom United ===
Nakhon Pathom United president, Panuwat Sasomsup, an admirer of his coaching abilities, enquire the possibilities of Nawas to coach the club for the recently promoted club which is competing in the 2023–24 Thai League 1 season. On 5 June 2023, the club announced Nawas as their new head coach who signed an initial one-year contract in which he was the accolade of being the first Singaporean to lead a Thai football club in the top tier. Nawas turned down offers from three Indian clubs as he was interested in the club vision. Akbar guided the club to their highest ever recorded win in their history for second time in one season with both matches coming against Mahajak Samutprakan 7–0 on 5 October 2023 and Thai Spirit 10–0 on 1 November 2023 in the 2023–24 Thai FA Cup. Akbar contract was then renewed for the 2024–25 season, however, after a string of poor performances, he resigned from his post on 10 September 2024.

=== Return to Tampines Rovers ===
On 20 June 2025, Akbar returned to Tampines Rovers, after nearly a decade to take the role of head coach. He won his first silverware with the club in his first game in-charge, a 4–1 win over reigning Singapore Premier League champions, the Lion City Sailors in the Singapore Community Shield match. In September, Akbar left the club after a mutual agreement with assistant coach Noh Rahman taking over as head coach.

== Personal life ==
Nawas' son, Saifullah Akbar, is a professional footballer in the Singapore Premier League.

== Managerial statistics ==
As of match played 24 August 2025

Managerial record by team and tenure
Team	From	To	Record				
Team	From	To	P	W	D	L	Win %
Tampines Rovers Reserves	1 January 2015	31 December 2015	1	0	0	1	0.00
Tampines Rovers	27 May 2016	27 January 2017	24	15	1	8	62.50
Global Cebu	20 June 2017	31 December 2017	11	4	5	2	36.36
Chennai City	20 March 2018	22 June 2020	45	21	11	13	46.67
Balestier Khalsa	22 October 2021	31 August 2022	22	6	2	14	27.27
Udon Thani	1 September 2022	18 December 2022	16	2	2	12	12.50
Udon Thani	17 February 2023	5 June 2023	12	3	1	8	25.00
Nakhon Pathom United	5 June 2023	10 September 2024	39	11	9	19	28.21
Tampines Rovers	20 June 2025	11 September 2025	3	2	1	0	66.67
Total			173	64	32	77	36.99

== Honours ==
=== Managerial ===
Chennai City

- I League: 2018–19
- I-League Syed Abdul Rahim Award (Best Coach award): 2018–19

==== Tampines Rovers ====
- Singapore Community Shield : 2025
