= Nenad Novaković (footballer, born 1986) =

Bosnian footballer

Personal information
- Full name: Nenad Novaković
- Date of birth: 23 March 1986 (age 40)
- Place of birth: Bosnia, Yugoslavia
- Height: 1.88 m (6 ft 2 in)
- Position: Center back

Senior career*
| Years | Team | Apps | (Gls) |
| 2009–2010 | Sloboda Tula | 0 | (0) |
| 2010–2012 | Rudar Velenje | 40 | (0) |
| 2012 | Gradina | 1 | (0) |
| 2013 | Timok | 15 | (1) |
| 2013 | Mladost Velika Obarska | 10 | (0) |
| 2014–2015 | Naft Maysan | | |
| 2016–2017 | Akhaa Ahli Aley | 21 | (1) |
| 2017–2018 | Tripoli SC | 19 | (2) |
| 2018–2019 | Churchill Brothers | 18 | (1) |
- * Club domestic league appearances and goals as of 00:42, 28 September 2019 (UTC)

Nenad Novaković is a Bosnian footballer who last played for Churchill Brothers S.C. as a defender.
