= FC Pune City Reserves and Academy =

Pune City Reserves and Academy
- Nickname: The Stallions
- Founded: 2016
- Dissolved: 2019
- Chairman: Gaurav Modwel
- League: I-League 2nd Division (Reserves); Youth League U18 (U18)
Home colours	Away colours

FC Pune City (R) was FC Pune City's reserve team that participanted in the I-League 2nd Division. FC Pune City Academy was the youth setup of FC Pune City. They participated in Youth League U18 and U15, as well as Pune Football League.

== History ==
=== Formation ===
On 26 August 2016, it was announced that FC Pune City had purchased the Pune F.C. Academy and rebranded it under their name. At the same time, the team unveiled their youth development plans which included fielding teams in Youth League U18 and U15, as well as Subroto Cup and Pune Football League.

=== Shut down ===
FC Pune City Reserves and Academy got dissolved in 2019, soon after their first team FC Pune City shut down its operations due financial and technical difficulties. The club's ownership was sold. The franchise rights was bought by Hyderabad-based IT entrepreneur Vijay Madduri and former Kerala Blasters FC CEO Varun Tripuneni. They subsequently launched a new club, Hyderabad FC.

== Last squad ==
As of 13 May 2018:

Note: Flags indicate national team as defined under FIFA eligibility rules; some limited exceptions apply. Players may hold more than one non-FIFA nationality.

No.	Pos.	Nation	Player
1	GK	IND	Anuj Kumar
2	DF	IND	Harpreet Singh (Captain)
3	FW	IND	Rajesh khan
4	DF	IND	Nitish Aswani
5	DF	IND	Thomas Lalengkima
6	MF	IND	Abhishek Halder
7	DF	IND	Lalramzauva Khiangte
8	MF	IND	Wungngayam Muirang
9	FW	IND	Gani Ahmmed Nigam
10	MF	IND	Yadav Rahul
11	MF	IND	Ashish Rai
12	DF	IND	Karan Gurung
13	GK	IND	Depopriya Das

No.	Pos.	Nation	Player
14	DF	IND	Sharry Singh
15	FW	IND	Baller Singh
16	MF	IND	Ningombam Sana Singh
17	FW	IND	Ishan V Dey
18	FW	IND	Jakob Vanlalhimpuia
20	MF	IND	Omega Vanlalhruaitluanga
21	DF	IND	Amritpal Singh
22	MF	IND	Buanthunglun Samte
23	MF	IND	Sajid Hossain
24	FW	IND	Omkar More
35	MF	IND	Gaurav Bora
45	FW	IND	Sebastian Thangmuansang

== Honours ==
- IFA Shield
  - Winners (1): 2017
- Bandodkar Gold Trophy
  - Winners (1): 2016
