= 2017 IFA Shield =

২০১৭ আইএফএ শিল্ড

Tournament details
- Country: India
- Dates: 14 May – 11 June 2017
- Teams: 25 (10 in final round)

Final positions
- Champions: FC Pune City Youth (1st title)
- Runners-up: Mohun Bagan-SAIL Academy

Tournament statistics
- Matches played: 39
- Goals scored: 90 (2.31 per match)

The 2017 IFA Shield was the 121st edition of the IFA Shield. The tournament was designed as a U19 youth football tournament since 2015.That year, ten football clubs participated in final round. FC Pune City beat Mohun Bagan A.C. in final by 3–0 on 11 June 2017 to clinch their first IFA Shield title.

== Venue ==
All the matches were held at East Bengal Ground, Mohun Bagan Ground, Mohammedan Sporting Ground and Howrah Maidan.

== Qualifying round ==
16 teams participated in the qualifying round and Pathachakra FC qualified to final round. Pathachakra defeated Kolkata XI by 1–1, (Pen 4–2) to enter the final round.

== Final round ==
FC Pune City beats Mohun Bagan A.C. in final by 3–0 on 11 June 2017.
