= Roberto Eslava =

Spanish footballer

Personal information
- Full name: Roberto Eslava Suárez
- Date of birth: 22 January 1988 (age 38)
- Place of birth: Telde, Spain
- Height: 1.80 m (5 ft 11 in)
- Position: Centre-back

Youth career
- Telde

Senior career*
Years	Team	Apps	(Gls)
2007–2008	Telde		
2008–2010	Las Palmas B	14	(0)
2010–2011	Universidad LP	10	(0)
2011–2012	Marino		
2012–2013	Atlético Granadilla		
2013–2015	Marino		
2015–2017	San Fernando	6	(1)
2017–2018	Unionistas	27	(2)
2018–2020	Chennai City	31	(3)
2020–2021	Izarra	1	(0)
2021–2022	Mensajero	45	(0)
- * Club domestic league appearances and goals as of 18:25, 5 June 2022 (UTC)

Roberto Eslava Suárez (born 22 January 1988) is a Spanish professional footballer who plays as a centre-back.

== Club career ==
Born in Telde, Eslava made his senior debut in the 2007–08 season with UD Telde in Tercera Division. He spent the following two seasons with UD Las Palmas Atlético and Universidad de Las Palmas CF in Segunda División B, before returning to the fourth tier in 2011 with CD Marino.

In 2012, Eslava joined Atlético Granadilla also in the fourth division. Although his team managed to reach the promotion play-offs, but was eliminated after losing to Gimnástica Segoviana.

After a stint back at Marino, Eslava signed for UD San Fernando on 25 July 2015. On 2 October 2017, he moved to fellow league club Unionistas de Salamanca CF, and helped the side achieve promotion to the third level.

On 2 May 2018, Eslava moved abroad and joined Indian I-League club Chennai City FC. He made his professional debut on 26 October, starting in a 4–1 home routing of Indian Arrows. In that season, he helped the team winning the league.

On 8 July 2020, Eslava returned to Spain and its third division, after agreeing to a contract with CD Izarra. In January 2022, Eslava moved to CD Mensajero. He left the club at the end of the 2021–22 season.

== Honours ==
=== Club ===
Chennai City FC

- I-League: 2018–19
