= 2019–20 Punjab FC season =

Indian football club season

Punjab
2019–20 season
- Owner: Ranjit Bajaj; Roundglass Sports
- Head Coach: Yan Law
- Stadium: Tau Devi Lal Stadium (I-League)
Home colours	Away colours

The 2019–20 Punjab F.C. Season was the club's fourth season in the I-League.

== Transfers ==
=== In ===
No.	Position	Player	Previous club	Transfer fee	Date	Ref
	GK	(Nepal) Kiran Kumar Limbu	(Maldives) TC Sports Club	Free agent	17 July 2019	
	MF	(The Gambia) Dawda Ceesay	(India) Churchill Brothers	Free agent	18 July 2019	
15	MF	(India) Sanju Pradhan	(India) Mumbai City	Free agent	2 August 2019	
	FW	(Nigeria) Orok Essien		Free agent	8 August 2019	
	FW	(Brazil) Sérgio Barboza	(Laos) Master 7 FC	Free agent	9 August 2019	
18	FW	(India) Beikhokhei Beingaichho		Free agent	13 August 2019	
09	FW	(India) Bali Gagandeep	(India) East Bengal	Free agent	13 August 2019	
03	DF	(Liberia) Teah Dennis Jr.	(India) Southern Samity	Free agent	31 August 2019	
	DF	(Brazil) Danilo Quipapá	(Brazil) Central	Free agent	31 August 2019	
02	DF	(India) Jayananda Singh	(India) Delhi Dynamos	Free agent	31 August 2019	

=== Out ===
No.	Position	Player	Outgoing club	Ref
05	DF	(Ivory Coast) Lancine Touré	(Bangladesh) Brothers Union	
06	MF	(Syria) Mahmoud Amnah	(India) Southern Samity	
08	MF	(Ghana) Khalif Alhassan	(India) Churchill Brothers	
09	FW	(India) C.S. Sabeeth	(India) Ozone FC	
10	FW	(Spain) Juan Quero Barraso		
17	FW	(Ukraine) Roland Rassel Bilala		
23	MF	(India) Jagpreet Singh		
30	GK	(India) Arshdeep Singh	(India) Odisha FC	
40	DF	(Colombia) Caicedo Rodriguez	(Spain) Real Avilés CF	
42	MF	(Ghana) William Opoku	(India) Ozone FC	
43	FW	(Ivory Coast) Alexander Kouame	(India) Kalighat M S	

== Squad ==
As of 2 September 2019

Note: Flags indicate national team as defined under FIFA eligibility rules; some limited exceptions apply. Players may hold more than one non-FIFA nationality.

No.	Pos.	Nation	Player
1	GK	IND	Bhaskar Roy
2	DF	IND	Jayananda Singh
3	DF	LBR	Teah Dennis Jr.
6	MF	IND	Souvik Das
9	FW	IND	Bali Gagandeep
11	FW	IND	Manandeep Singh
12	FW	IND	L. Lotha
13	DF	IND	Akashdeep Singh
15	FW	IND	Sanju Pradhan
17	FW	IND	T. Suranjit Singh
18	FW	IND	Beikhokhei Beingaichho
19	FW	IND	Makan Chote
20	FW	IND	Sreyas V.G
21	FW	IND	Akash Sangwan
22	GK	IND	Nidhin Lal
23	FW	IND	Harminder Singh
24	DF	IND	Thoiba Singh Moirangthem
25	DF	IND	Devansh Dabas
26	DF	IND	Imanuel Lalthazuala
28	FW	IND	Prabhjot Singh
32	FW	IND	Luntinmang Haokip
33	DF	IND	Munmun Lugun

No.	Pos.	Nation	Player
34	MF	IND	Dilli Ram Sanyasi
38	FW	IND	Atinder Mani
39	FW	IND	Arshdeep Singh
40	MF	IND	T. Radhakanta
41	MF	IND	Taranpreet Singh
49	MF	IND	Amandeep Singh
50	MF	IND	Denzil Franco
—	DF	IND	Anwar Ali
—	DF	IND	Arashpreet Singh
—	DF	IND	Deepak Devrani
—	DF	IND	Lalrinchhana Tochhawng
—	MF	IND	Akhil Verma
—	FW	IND	Moinuddin Khan
—	FW	IND	Girik Khosla
—	FW	IND	Hitova Ayemi
—	MF	GAM	Dawda Ceesay
—	GK	NEP	Kiran Kumar Limbu
—	FW	NGR	Orok Essien
—	FW	BRA	Sérgio Barboza Jr
—	DF	BRA	Danilo Quipapá

== See also ==
- 2019–20 in Indian football
- 2019–20 I-League
