= 2018–19 Minerva Punjab FC season =

Indian football club season

Minerva Punjab
2018–19 season
- Owner: Ranjit Bajaj
- Technical Director: (Northern Ireland) Paul Munster
- Stadium: Tau Devi Lal Stadium (I-League); The Arena (AFC Cup)
- I-League: 9th
- Punjab State Super Football League: Winners
- Super Cup: DNP
- AFC Champions League: Qualifying play-off
- AFC Cup: Group stage
- Top goalscorer: (Ivory Coast) Lancine Touré (Nigeria) Philip Njoku (Ghana) W. Asiedu (2 goals each)
- Highest home attendance: 8,591vs Churchill Brothers (28 October 2018)
Home colours	Away colours

The 2018–19 Minerva Punjab FC Season was the club's third season in the I-League.

== Sponsors ==
As of 16 October 2018

Sponsors Type	Sponsor's Name
Sponsor	Apollo Tyres
Kit Sponsor	Apollo Tyres
Sports Drink Sponsor	Gatorade
Nutrition Partner	Fast&Up
Performance Analysis Partner	Catapult Sports
Fitness Partner	Anytime Fitness

== Transfers ==
Minerva Punjab saw an exodus of top players after their I-League victory in the 2017 season. Perhaps the biggest departure that Minerva Punjab was that of Chencho Gyeltshen. The Bhutanese attacker was the stand-out performer for Minerva in 2017 and was subsequently sold to Bengaluru FC. His departure left a huge gap in the Minerva squad.

Following Chencho out of the door were Kiran Chemjong, Sukhdev Singh, Kamalpreet Singh, Bali Gagandeep, Kassim Aidara, Girik Khosla, Rakshit Dagar, and Abhishek Ambekar.

Kamalpreet Singh, Gagandeep, Aidara, and Rakshit Dagar all signed for Minerva's title rivals East Bengal F.C. Sukhdev Singh and Ambekar moved on to Mohun Bagan. Ahead of the 2018-19 I-League season, Minerva were left with a depleted squad.

On 6 July 2018 Minerva Punjab signed forward Yu Kuboki on a permanent transfer from Australian club Sydney Olympic FC. He had been in scintillating form for Sydney the previous season, scoring 11 goals in 22 matches as an attacking midfielder or a withdrawn striker.

In August 2018 Minerva signed three players including Nigerian forward Philip Njoku.

In September 2018 they signed former Ozone FC striking duo C. S. Sabeeth and Brazilian Robert De Souza. They also extended contracts with defender Akashdeep Singh and striker Akash Sangwan.

=== Contract extension ===
No.	Position	Player	Date	Ref
	FW	(India) Akash Sangwan	6 September 2018	
	DF	(India) Akashdeep Singh	9 September 2018	
	MF	(India) Amandeep Singh	10 September 2018	
	MF	(India) Souvik Das	14 September 2018	
	DF	(India) Deepak Devrani	19 September 2018	
	MF	(Ghana) William Opoku	21 September 2018	
	GK	(India) Arshdeep Singh	22 September 2018	
	DF	(India) Arshpreet Singh	23 September 2018	
	GK	(India) Bhaskar Roy	26 September 2018	
	MF	(India) Randeep Singh	1 October 2018	
	FW	(India) Rajan Negi	9 October 2018	

=== In ===
No.	Position	Player	Previous club	Transfer fee	Date	Ref
10	FW	(Japan) Yu Kuboki	(Australia) Sydney Olympic FC	Free agent	6 July 2018	
	FW	(India) Sandeep Rajput	MPFC winter Camp	Free agent	30 July 2018	
4	FW	(Nigeria) Philip Njoku	(Finland) FC Inter Turku	Free agent	7 August 2018	
	MF	(India) Liandala Fanai	(India) Aizawl	Free agent	12 August 2018	
7	FW	(India) Hitova Ayemi	(India) Fateh Hyderabad	Free agent	25 August 2018	
9	FW	(India) C. S. Sabeeth	(India) Ozone F.C.	Free agent	2 September 2018	
14	FW	(India) Dilli Ram Sanyasi	(India) Hindustan FC	Free agent	5 September 2018	
	FW	(Brazil) Robert De Souza	(India) Ozone FC	Free agent	7 September 2018	
	DF	(India) Mohamed Irshad	(India) Gokulam Kerala	Free agent	8 September 2018	
28	MF	(India) Prabhjot Singh	unattached	Free agent	11 September 2018	
50	DF	(Rwanda) Aimable Nsabimana	(Rwanda) APR FC	Free agent	13 September 2018	
12	DF	(India) Nikhil Pal	(India) Chennai City	Free agent	16 September 2018	
	MF	(India) Akhil PM	(India) FC Kerala	Free agent	26 September 2018	
	FW	(India) Atinder Mani	(India) Real Kashmir	Free agent	19 October 2018	
11	FW	(India) Manandeep Singh	(India) Mohun Bagan	Free agent	19 October 2018	
	MF	(India) Jagpreet Singh	unattached	Free agent	27 October 2018	
22	GK	(India) Nidhin Lal	(India) Shillong Lajong	Free agent	27 October 2018	
5	DF	(Ivory Coast) Lancine Touré	(India) Mohammedan	Free agent	27 October 2018	
47	MF	(Ivory Coast) Alex Kouame	unattached	Free agent	31 October 2018	
6	MF	(Nigeria) Bala Al Hassan Dahir	(India) F.C. Kerala	Free agent	5 November 2018	
18	FW	(Nigeria) Donatus Edafe	(Slovenia) ND Gorica	Free agent	8 November 2018	
	FW	(India) Moinuddin Khan	(India) Mohun Bagan	Free agent	9 November 2018	
	DF	(Colombia) Caicedo Rodriguez	(Maldives) Thinadhoo Sports	Free agent	27 November 2018	
	MF	(Spain) Juan Quero	(Spain) Fuenlabrada	Free agent	27 January 2019	
	FW	(Saint Vincent and the Grenadines) Cornelius Stewart	(Maldives) Maziya	Free agent	31 January 2019	

=== Out ===
No.	Position	Player	Outgoing club	Ref
27	DF	(India) Abhishek Ambekar	(India) Mohun Bagan	
7	FW	(Bhutan) Chencho Gyeltshen	(India) Bengaluru	
16	MF	(Senegal) Kassim Aidara	(India) East Bengal	
9	FW	(India) Bali Gagandeep	(India) East Bengal	
40	GK	(India) Rakshit Dagar	(India) East Bengal	
22	DF	(India) Kamalpreet Singh	(India) East Bengal	
31	GK	(Nepal) Kiran Chemjong	(Maldives) T.C. Sports Club	
3	DF	(India) Sukhdev Singh	(India) Mohun Bagan	
10	FW	(India) Moinuddin Khan	(India) Mohun Bagan	
11	MF	(India) Girik Khosla	(India) NorthEast United FC	
13	MF	(Ivory Coast) Bazie Armand	(India) Mohammedan	
24	DF	(Ivory Coast) Guy Eric Dano	(India) Rainbow AC	
48	FW	(Brazil) Robert Dzouza	unattached	
50	DF	(Rwanda) Aimable Nsabimana	unattached	
10	FW	(Japan) Yu Kuboki	unattached	
4	FW	(Nigeria) Philip Njoku	unattached	
6	MF	(Nigeria) Bala Dahir	unattached	
18	FW	(Nigeria) Donatus Edafe	unattached	

== Squad ==
=== First-team squad ===
As of 28 February 2019

Note: Flags indicate national team as defined under FIFA eligibility rules; some limited exceptions apply. Players may hold more than one non-FIFA nationality.

No.	Pos.	Nation	Player
1	GK	IND	Bhaskar Roy
2	DF	IND	Saurabh Bhanwala
3	DF	IND	Prateek Joshi
5	DF	CIV	Lancine Touré
6	DF	SYR	Mahmoud Amnah
7	MF	IND	Hitova Ayemi
8	MF	GHA	Khalif Alhassan
9	FW	IND	C.S. Sabeeth
10	FW	ESP	Juan Quero Barraso
11	FW	IND	Manandeep Singh
12	DF	IND	Nikhil Pal
13	DF	IND	Akashdeep Singh
14	FW	IND	Dilli Ram Sanyasi
15	MF	IND	Souvik Das
17	MF	UKR	Roland Rassel Bilala
19	MF	IND	Makan Chote
21	FW	IND	Akash Sangwan

No.	Pos.	Nation	Player
22	GK	IND	Nidhin Lal
23	MF	IND	Jagpreet Singh
24	DF	IND	Thoiba Singh Moirangthem
25	DF	IND	Arshpreet Singh
26	DF	IND	Deepak Devrani
28	FW	IND	Prabhjot Singh
30	GK	IND	Arshdeep Singh
32	FW	IND	Luntinmang Haokip
33	MF	IND	Akhil Verma
38	FW	IND	Atinder Mani
40	DF	COL	Caicedo Rodriguez
42	MF	GHA	William Opoku
44	MF	CIV	Alexander Kouame
49	MF	IND	Amandeep Singh
50	FW	IND	Moinuddin Khan

== Team management ==
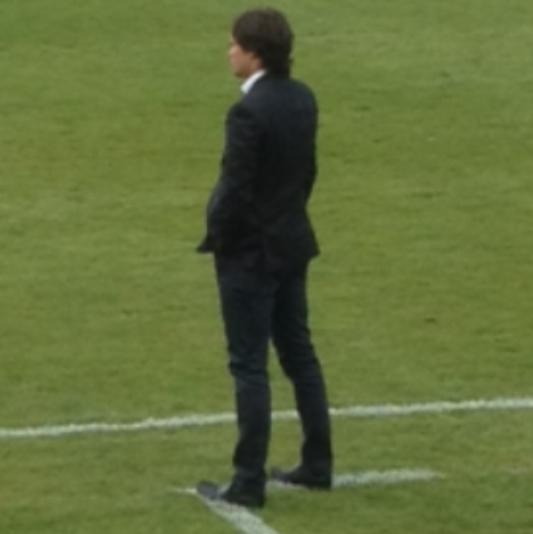
Paul Munster, current Minerva Punjab technical director

As of 9 August 2018.

Position	Name
Technical director	(Northern Ireland) Paul Munster
Head coach	(India) Sachin Badadhe
Assistant coach	Vacant
Team manager	vacant
Physiotherapist	(India) Karuna Kant Gupta

== Pre-season and friendlies ==
Minerva Punjab kicked off their pre-season preparations by participating in the 2018 Punjab State Super Football League from 26 August 2018. With 4 wins and 3 draws Minerva finished second in the league table. They beat league leader FC Punjab Police in the finals to win the 32nd Punjab State Super Football League title.

=== Punjab State Super League ===
Win Draw Loss

26 August 2018 2018 Punjab State Super Football League	Minerva Punjab	2–2	FC Punjab Police	Hoshiarpur, Punjab
16:00 IST	Yu Kuboki 64' 89'	Report	Vijay 47'; Sandeep 69'

2 September 2018 2018 Punjab State Super Football League	Kehar SC	0–4	Minerva Punjab FC	Jalandhar, Punjab
16:00 IST		Report	Akash Sangwan 6'; D'Souza 30'; Yu Kuboki 74'; Dilliram 90+2'	Stadium: DAV College Stadium

7 September 2018 2018 Punjab State Super Football League	Minerva Punjab FC	0–0	Dalbir FC	Mohali, Punjab
16:00 IST		Report		Stadium: Minerva Academy ground

12 September 2018 2018 Punjab State Super Football League	Rail Coach Factory	0–1	Minerva Punjab FC	Kapurthala, Punjab
16:00 IST		Report	Yu Kuboki 90+2'	Stadium: RCF Stadium

15 September 2018 2018 Punjab State Super Football League	CRPF SC	1–3	Minerva Punjab FC	Jalandhar, Punjab
16:00 IST	Dolai 74'	Report	Yu Kuboki 3'; C.S. Sabeeth 31', 90+7'	Stadium: CRPF ground

20 September 2018 2018 Punjab State Super Football League	Guru Football Club	0–1	Minerva Punjab FC	Jalandhar, Punjab
16:00 IST		Report	Dilliram 82'	Stadium: Lyallpur Khalsa College grounds

27 September 2018 2018 Punjab State Super Football League	Minerva Punjab FC	1–1	BSF FC	Jalandhar, Punjab
16:00 IST	R.Negi 30'	Report	Sadam 7'	Stadium: Lyallpur Khalsa College grounds

30 September 2018 2018 Punjab State Super Football League Semifinal	Minerva Punjab FC	1–0	CRPF SC	Jalandhar, Punjab
15:00 IST	William Opoku 13'	Report		Stadium: Dolike football stadium

3 October 2018 2018 Punjab State Super Football League Final	FC Punjab Police	1–2	Minerva Punjab FC	Mahilpur, Punjab
15:00 IST	Jaspreet 85'	Report	Souvik Das 45+3'; Dilliram 75'	Stadium: S.G.G.S. Khalsa College grounds

Notes

1. Match abandoned at 81 minute due to bad weather conditions.The remaining 9 minutes were played on 17 September 2018.

=== J&K Invitational Cup ===
Minerva Punjab participated in the J&K Invitational Cup organized by Real Kashmir FC. It was a knock out tournament.

19 October 2018 Quarter Final	Minerva Punjab FC	3–1	J&K Bank	Srinagar, J&K
15:00 IST	C.S. Sabeeth 43'; William Opoku 90+5'; Yu Kuboki 90+6'	Report	Prem Kumar 2'	Stadium: TRC Turf Ground

21 October 2018 Semi Final	Minerva Punjab FC	3–0	Sudeva Moonlight F.C.	Srinagar, J&K
12:00 IST	William Opoku 14'; Manandeep Singh 58'; Amandeep 70'	Report		Stadium: TRC Turf Ground

23 October 2018 Final	Real Kashmir	(0–0)	Minerva Punjab FC	Srinagar, J&K
14:30 IST		Report		Stadium: TRC Turf Ground

Notes

1. The prevailing situation following the death of many civilians in Kulgam blast forced the organisers of Jammu and Kashmir Invitational Cup-2018 to cancel the final and declare the finalists - Real Kashmir FC and Minerva Punjab FC as joint winners.

=== Friendlies ===
8 July 2018 1	Minerva Punjab FC	1-1 (4–3 p)	Indian Air Force	Feroz Shah Kotla, Delhi, India
20:00 IST	Yu Kuboki 18'	Report	? 89'	Stadium: Ambedkar Stadium

25 September 2018 2	NorthEast United	1–0	Minerva Punjab FC	Guwahati, Assam
15:00 IST	Mascia 71' (pen.)	Report		Stadium: Indira Gandhi Athletic Stadium

27 September 2018 3	Delhi Dynamos FC	3–3	Minerva Punjab FC	New Delhi
16:00 IST	Kaluđerović 27', 57'; Romeo 84'	Report	Alex 4'; Yu Kuboki 87'; Dilliram 90+1'	Stadium: Jawaharlal Nehru Stadium Training Pitch

== Competitions ==
=== I-League ===
==== Matches ====
Win Draw Loss Void Postponed

28 October 2018 1	Minerva Punjab FC	0–0	Churchill Brothers	Panchkula, Haryana
14:00 IST		Report		Stadium: Tau Devi Lal Stadium; Attendance: 8,591; Referee: Umesh Bora

31 October 2018 2	Minerva Punjab FC	0–1	Real Kashmir	Panchkula, Haryana
14:00 IST	Dilliram Sanyasi (yellow card) 90+2'	Report	Gnohere Krizo 74'; Brian Mascarenhas (yellow card) 90+1'	Stadium: Tau Devi Lal Stadium; Attendance: 5,171; Referee: Rosario Fernandes

10 November 2018 3	Aizawl FC	1–2	Minerva Punjab FC	Aizawl, Mizoram
14:00 IST	Govin Singh (yellow card) 30'; Kareem Omolaja (yellow card) 62'; Léonce Dodoz 84' (pen.)	Report	Bala Alhassan (yellow card) 37'; Lancine Touré 10', 58' (yellow card) 55'	Stadium: Rajiv Gandhi Stadium; Attendance: 3,871; Referee: Raktim Shah

18 November 2018 4	Gokulam Kerala	1-0	Minerva Punjab FC	Calicut, Kerala
19:30 IST	Rajesh S. 60'; Suhair V P (yellow card) 72'	Report	Akasdeep Singh (yellow card) 19'; Philip Njoku (yellow card) 45+20'; Souvik Das (yellow card) 79'	Stadium: EMS Stadium; Attendance: 30,246; Referee: Senthil Nathan

23 November 2018 5	Shillong Lajong FC	2–2	Minerva Punjab FC	Shillong, Meghalaya
17:00 IST	Kenstar Kharshong (yellow card) 23'; Phrangki Buam 24'; Allen Lyngdoh 43' (yellow card) 57'	Report	W. Asiedu 45+3'; Souvik Das (yellow card) 49'; Philip Njoku 75'	Stadium: JL Nehru Stadium, Shillong; Attendance: 5,275; Referee: Pratik Mondal

1 December 2018 6	Minerva Punjab FC	1–0	Indian Arrows	Panchkula, Haryana
14:00 IST	T.moirangthem (yellow card) 42'; Philip Njoku 74'; B.Dahir (yellow card) 80'	Report	Aniket Jadhav (yellow card) 87'	Stadium: Tau Devi Lal Stadium; Attendance: 4,275; Referee: Priyobarta Singh

4 December 2018 7	East Bengal	0–1	Minerva Punjab FC	Kolkata, West Bengal
17:00 IST	Jhonny Acosta (yellow card) 73'	Report	W. Asiedu 75'	Stadium: Salt Lake Stadium; Attendance: 16,821; Referee: Crystal John

==== League table ====
Pos	Team	Pld	W	D	L	GF	GA	GD	Pts	Qualification or relegation
7	Aizawl	20	6	6	8	27	28	−1	24	
8	Indian Arrows	20	6	3	11	19	28	−9	21	
9	Minerva Punjab	20	4	6	10	10	19	−9	18 (Note: The game between Minerva Punjab and Real Kashmir was rescheduled, but eventually it was not played and both teams were awarded a point.)	
10	Gokulam Kerala	20	3	8	9	25	33	−8	17	
11	Shillong Lajong (R)	20	3	2	15	23	56	−33	11	Relegation to I-League 2nd Division (withdrew)

Source: I-league
Rules for classification: 1) points; 2) head-to-head points; 3) head-to-head goal difference; 4) goal difference; 5) number of goals scored; 6) drawing of lots
(R) Relegated

==== Results summary ====
Overall								Home						Away					
Pld	W	D	L	GF	GA	GD	Pts	W	D	L	GF	GA	GD	W	D	L	GF	GA	GD
7	3	2	2	6	5	+1	11	1	1	1	1	1	0	2	1	1	5	4	+1

Source: I-League

==== Results by round ====
Round	1	2	3	4	5	6	7	8
Ground	H	H	A	A	A	H	A	
Result	D	L	W	L	D	W	W	
Position	7	11	6	7	7	5	2	

Updated to match(es) played on 12 November 2018. Source: I-League
A = Away; H = Home; W = Win; D = Draw; L = Loss

=== 2019 AFC Champions League ===
The AFC Champions League is the premier continental football competition organized by the Asian Football Confederation (AFC). As the champions of the I-League the previous season, Minerva Punjab FC earned a chance to qualify for the tournament. India did not have a direct-entry spot in the AFC Champions League and thus the champion team from India had to qualify for the tournament through the preliminary rounds. Minerva Punjab were put up against Saipa FC of Iran.

12 February 2019 PR 2	Saipa FC (Iran)	v	(India) Minerva Punjab FC
--:-- UTC+3:30

=== 2019 AFC Cup ===
Pos	Team	Pld	W	D	L	GF	GA	GD	Pts	Qualification	ABD	CFC	MIN	MMC
1	(Bangladesh) Abahani Limited Dhaka	6	4	1	1	12	5	+7	13	Inter-zone play-off semi-finals	—	3–2	2–2	5–0
2	(India) Chennaiyin	6	3	2	1	9	6	+3	11		1–0	—	0–0	2–0
3	(India) Minerva Punjab	6	0	5	1	6	7	−1	5		0–1	1–1	—	2–2
4	(Nepal) Manang Marshyangdi Club	6	0	2	4	5	14	−9	2		0–1	2–3	1–1	—

Source: AFC
Rules for classification: Group stage tiebreakers

== Statistics ==
=== Goal Scorers ===
Rank	No.	Pos.	Nat.	Name	I-League	AFC	Indian Super Cup	Total
1	22	DF	(Ivory Coast)	Lancine Touré	2	0	0	2
1	9	MF	(Nigeria)	Philip Njoku	2	0	0	2
1	17	FW	(Ghana)	William Opoku	2	0	0	2
				Own Goals	-	-	-	
				Total	6	6	0	6

==== Hat-tricks ====
Player	Against	Result	Date	Competition

== See also ==
- 2018–19 in Indian football
- 2018–19 I-League
