= Nsabimana =

Nsabimana is a surname. Notable people with the surname include:

- Aimable Nsabimana (born 1997), Rwandan footballer
- Déogratias Nsabimana (1945–1994), Rwandan general
