= Surinder Singh (footballer) =

Indian association football coach

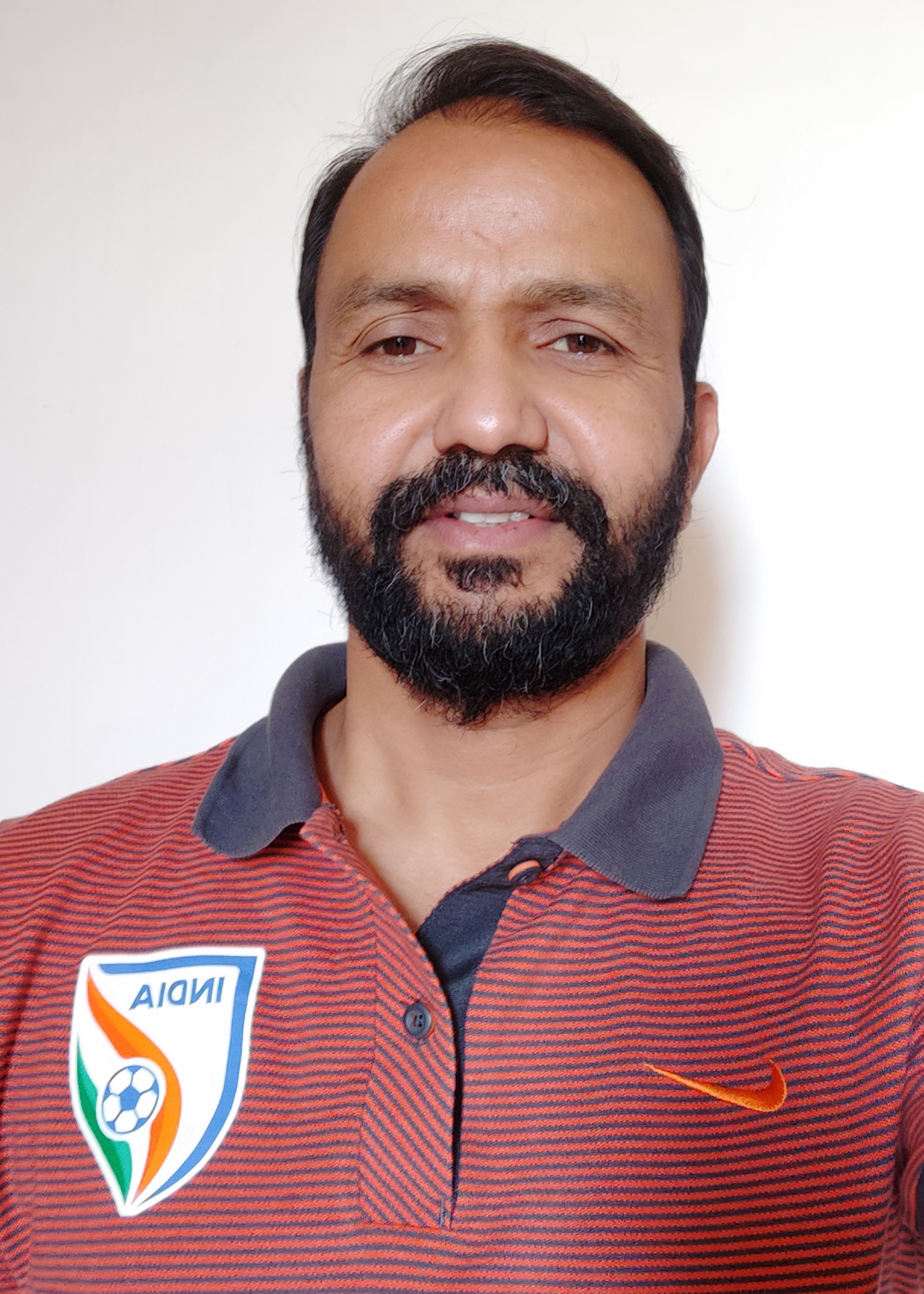
- Singh in 2020

Personal information
- Date of birth: 12 July 1973 (age 53)
- Place of birth: Chandigarh, India

Team information
- Current team: Delhi FC (technical director)

Managerial career
- Years: Team
- 2011–2013: Pailan Arrows (assistant)
- 2015–2017: Minerva Punjab
- 2021–2023: Delhi
- 2025–: Philippines U17 (women) (assistant)

Surinder Singh (born 12 July 1973) is an Indian football coach.

== Coaching career ==
Born in Chandigarh, Singh began his coaching with the All India Football Federation, working with the national federation's various youth teams. Prior to working with the AIFF, Singh was head coach of the St. Stephen's Football Academy for 23 years, working with future India internationals such as Gurpreet Singh Sandhu, Sandesh Jhingan, Anirudh Thapa, Mohammad Sajid Dhot, and Johny Chand Singh. On 25 December 2011, it was announced that Singh would become the assistant coach of Pailan Arrows of the I-League.

In 2015, Singh became the head coach of Minerva Punjab during the I-League 2nd Division campaign. He led Minerva Punjab to second place in the league, missing promotion over Dempo. In December 2016, it was announced that Minerva Punjab would gain direct-entry into the I-League and that Singh would remain head coach. After the 2016–17 season, Singh was relieved of his duties as head coach. In July 2023, Singh managed the U13 team of Minerva Academy that went on to win the Gothia Cup in Sweden.

== Statistics ==
=== Managerial statistics (Minerva) ===
Team	From	To	Record				
Team	From	To	G	W	D	L	Win %
Minerva Punjab	2015	12 August 2017	36	13	11	12	36.11
Total			36	13	11	12	36.11
