= Yu Kuboki =

Japanese footballer

Personal information
- Date of birth: 28 July 1989 (age 37)
- Place of birth: Tokyo, Japan
- Height: 1.68 m (5 ft 6 in)
- Position: Forward

Team information
- Current team: Minerva Punjab
- Number: 10

Youth career
- Yurigaoka Kids FC
- Tokyo Verdy
- Kokushikan University

Senior career*
Years	Team	Apps	(Gls)
2013	Customs United	20	(8)
2014	Samut Sakhon	0	(0)
2015	Chamchuri United	28	(19)
2016	Nakhon Pathom United	0	(0)
2016	Chachoengsao Hi-Tek	11	(7)
2016	Ayutthaya Warrior	6	(1)
2017	Sydney Olympic	22	(11)
2018	Minerva Punjab	4	(0)
- * Club domestic league appearances and goals as of 16:28 3 February 2019 (UTC)

Yu Kuboki (久保木優, Kuboki Yu; born 28 July 1989) is a Japanese footballer currently playing as a forward. He last played for Indian I-League club Minerva Punjab.

== Club statistics ==
As of 4 June 2019.

Club	Season	League			Cup		Total	
Club	Season	Division	Apps	Goals	Apps	Goals	Apps	Goals
Customs United	2013	Regional League Division 2	20	8	0	0	20	8
Chamchuri United	2015	Regional League Division 2	28	19	0	0	28	19
Chachoengsao Hi-Tek	2016	Regional League Division 2	11	7	3 (Note: Appearances in the Thai League Cup)	3	14	10
Ayutthaya Warrior	2016	Regional League Division 2	6	1	0	0	6	1
Sydney Olympic	2017	NPL NSW	22	11	3 (Note: Appearances in the FFA Cup)	1	25	12
Minerva Punjab	2018–19	I-League	4	0	0	0	4	0
Career total			91	46	6	4	97	50
