= Sukhdev Singh (footballer) =

Indian footballer

Personal information
- Date of birth: 21 September 1991 (age 35)
- Place of birth: Hoshiarpur, Punjab, India
- Height: 1.80 m (5 ft 11 in)
- Position: Defender

Senior career*
Years	Team	Apps	(Gls)
2017–2018	Minerva Punjab	17	(1)
2018	Mohun Bagan	0	(0)
- * Club domestic league appearances and goals as of 25 July 2018

Sukhdev Singh (born 21 September 1991) born in Hoshiarpur, Punjab is an Indian professional footballer who plays as a defender for Mohun Bagan in the I-League.

== Career ==
=== Minerva ===
He made his debut for Minerva on 25 November 2017 in I-League match against Mohun Bagan at Guru Nanak Stadium, Ludhiana as he played full match as his team drew match 1-1. Sukhdev Singh played a pivotal role in Minerva's I-League triumph.

=== Mohun Bagan ===
In May 2018 he joined Mohun Bagan.

However, on 15 September 2018 AIFF banned him for 6 months for contract violation.

Sukhdev Singh has been banned from playing any competitive match and also must pay a fine of Rs 50,000 each to AIFF and Minerva Punjab FC.

In July 2019 Mohun Bagan retained him for the 2019-20 I-League season. He came in as a 2nd half substitute for Mohun Bagan in their first preseason friendly against Salgaocar FC, which is his return to football after the ban.

=== Club ===
Statistics accurate as of 29 July 2018

Club	Season	League		Federation Cup		AFC		Total	
Club	Season	Apps	Goals	Apps	Goals	Apps	Goals	Apps	Goals
Minerva Punjab	2017–18	17	1	1	0	—	—	18	1
Mohun Bagan	2018–19	0	0	0	0	—	—	0	0
Career total		17	1	1	0	0	0	18	1

== Honours ==
=== Club ===
Minerva Punjab

- I-League: 2017–18
