= Alexander Kouame =

Ivorian footballer

Personal information
- Full name: Alexander Kouassi Kouame
- Date of birth: 28 December 1988 (age 37)
- Position: Forward

Team information
- Current team: Leopards
- Number: 47

Senior career*
Years	Team	Apps	(Gls)
2008–2011	Ouragahio		
2011–2016	Youssoufia Berrechid		
2017	Hearts of Oak	14	(6)
2018–2019	Minerva Punjab	5	(0)
2019–2020	Kalighat MS		
2020–	Leopards		
- * Club domestic league appearances and goals as of 18:46, 10 November 2020 (UTC)

Alexander (or Alexandre) 'Alex' Kouassi Kouame (born 28 December 1988) is an Ivorian footballer who currently plays as a forward for Leopards.

== Club career ==
Kouame joined Kenyan side Leopards in 2020.

== Career statistics ==
=== Club ===
As of 10 November 2020.

Club	Season	League			Cup		Continental		Other		Total	
Club	Season	Division	Apps	Goals	Apps	Goals	Apps	Goals	Apps	Goals	Apps	Goals
Hearts of Oak	2017	Ghana Premier League	14	6	0	0	–		0	0	14	6
Minerva Punjab	2018–19	I-League	5	0	0	0	–		0	0	5	0
Career total			19	6	0	0	0	0	0	0	19	6
