= Deepak Devrani =

Indian footballer (born 1992)

Personal information
- Date of birth: 10 December 1992 (age 33)
- Place of birth: New Delhi, India
- Height: 1.80 m (5 ft 11 in)
- Position: Centre-back

Youth career
- Chandigarh Football Academy
- East Bengal
- 2010-2011: Pailan Arrows

Senior career*
Years	Team	Apps	(Gls)
2011–2013	Pailan Arrows	18	(1)
2013–2014	Sporting Goa	9	(1)
2014-2015	Pune City	0	(0)
2015	→ Mohun Bagan (loan)		
2016	Mohun Bagan		
2016−2019	Minerva Punjab	23	(0)
2019−2020	TRAU	12	(2)
2020–2021	Gokulam Kerala	14	(0)
2021–2022	Chennaiyin	4	(0)
2022–2024	Punjab	8	(1)
2023–2024	→ Inter Kashi (loan)	12	(1)
2024-2026	Inter Kashi	1	

International career^{‡}
2007–2009	India U16	9	(2)
2009–2010	India U19	7	(2)
2011–	India U23	5	(1)
- * Club domestic league appearances and goals as of 22:02 (IST); 26 October 2025 ‡ National team caps and goals as of 22:02 (IST); 26 October 2025

Deepak Devrani (born 10 December 1992) is an Indian professional footballer who plays as a centre-back.

== Early career ==
Deepak was about 12 when he first starting kicking the ball. He first started playing football in Jawaharlal Nehru Stadium, Delhi, where his first coach was Nirmal Singh. Then he got selected for D.D.A. Yamuna Nagar where he played under coaches Naveen Khandwal and Ranjith Thapa. In 2007, he moved to the Chandigarh football academy. Since the under-16 level, he has been playing for the national team.

He started his career as a youngster with East Bengal. After not seeing any playing time for East Bengal he jumped at the opportunity to play for Pailan Arrows.

== Club career ==
=== Pailan Arrows ===
After years in the East Bengal youth system, Devrani was sent to play for the Pailan Arrows, a team that played in the I-League and aimed at preparing players for the 2018 World Cup. During the 2010-11 season, Devrani played only five times for Indian Arrows. Devrani then missed Pailan's first 20 games of the 2011-12 I-League with a knee injury in which Pailan did not win a single match. He made his debut for the Pailan Arrows on 25 March 2012.

Devrani scored his first goal for Pailan Arrows on 21 September 2012 against Mumbai during the 2012 Federation Cup in which he scored the equalizer for Pailan to help them draw the match 2–2. Devrani then scored his first I-League goal on 1 December 2012 against ONGC F.C. when he scored in the 10th minute to give Pailan the lead in a match that would end in favor of Pailan Arrows 4–1. Devrani however did not end December well as he again had to come off injured for Pailan Arrows in the 2nd minute of the match against East Bengal F.C. on 30 December 2012 as his side went down 3–0.

=== Sporting Goa ===
On 18 July 2013 it was confirmed that Devrani has signed for Sporting Goa with Ravi Kumar. He made his debut for Sporting Goa in the I-League on 24 October 2013 against Rangdajied at the Duler Stadium; in which he played the whole match and scored one goal in the 30th minute; as Sporting Goa won the match 3–0.

=== FC Pune City ===
Devrani signed up with FC Pune City for the 2014 Indian Super League.

=== Minerva Punjab FC ===
Devrani signed up with Minerva Punjab FC with their debut season in I-League.

=== TRAU ===
On 3 September 2019 Deepak signed a deal and moved to TRAU F.C.

=== Chennaiyin FC ===
On 4 August 2021, it was announced that Deepak had signed a one-year deal with the Indian Super League side Chennaiyin FC.

== Career statistics ==
=== Club ===
As of 8 April 2024

Club	Season	League			Cup		AFC		Total	
Club	Season	Division	Apps	Goals	Apps	Goals	Apps	Goals	Apps	Goals
Pailan Arrows	2010–11	I-League	5	0	1 (Note: Appearance(s) in Federation Cup)	0	—		6	0
Pailan Arrows	2011–12	I-League	1	0	3	0	—		4	0
Pailan Arrows	2012–13	I-League	17	1	3	1	—		20	2
Sporting Goa	2013–14	I-League	9	1	1	0	—		10	1
Pune City	2014	Indian Super League	0	0	0	0	—		0	0
Mohun Bagan (loan)	2014–15	I-League	0	0	0	0	—		0	0
Minerva Punjab	2016–17	I-League	5	0	0	0	—		5	0
Minerva Punjab	2017–18	I-League	6	0	1 (Note: Appearance(s) in Super Cup)	0	—		7	0
Minerva Punjab	2018–19	I-League	10	0	0	0	1 (Note: Appearance(s) in AFC Champions League)	0	11	0
TRAU	2019–20	I-League	12	2	0	0	—		12	2
Gokulam Kerala	2020–21	I-League	14	0	1 (Note: Appearance(s) in IFA Shield)	0	—		15	0
Chennaiyin	2021–22	Indian Super League	4	0	0	0	—		4	0
Punjab	2022–23	I-League	8	1	0	0	—		8	1
Inter Kashi (loan)	2023–24	I-League	12	1	1	0	—		13	1
Inter Kashi	2024–25	I-League	0	0	0	0	—		0	0
Inter Kashi	2025–26	Indian Super League			1	0				
Career total			103	6	12	1	1	0	116	7

== Honours ==
Minerva Punjab

- I-League: 2017–18

Gokulam Kerala

- I-League: 2020–21

Inter Kashi

- I-League: 2024–25

Individual

- I-League Team of the season: 2020–21
