= Lancine Touré =

Ivorian footballer

Personal information
- Full name: Lancine Touré
- Date of birth: 21 January 1995 (age 31)
- Place of birth: Ivory Coast
- Position: Defender

Team information
- Current team: Bangladesh Police FC
- Number: 5

Youth career
- AS GNN

Senior career*
Years	Team	Apps	(Gls)
2015–2017	Mohammedan	6	(0)
2017	Lonestar Kashmir	7	(0)
2017–2018	Langsning	9	(2)
2018	Mohammedan	11	(0)
2018–2019	Minerva Punjab	14	(2)
2019–	Brothers Union	10	(0)
2021–	Bangladesh Police FC	15	(3)
- * Club domestic league appearances and goals as of 30 June 2021

Lancine Touré (born 21 January 1995) is an Ivorian professional footballer, who plays for Bangladesh Police FC in the Bangladesh premier League as a defender.

== Career ==
Touré started his career with AS GNN of Niger Premier League.

In 2015, he moved to India, after believing the words of an agent who had promised to land him a lucrative contract with a professional club. However, the window for player signing was closed by then, and Touré was forced to make a decision whether to stay back in India or return. Thus, Touré came to Malappuram, the hub of Sevens football in Kerala, where African talents are major crowd-pullers and treated like gold dust.

The rigorous schedule of the Sevens world was a learning experience for Touré. While Sevens was profitable, Touré was aware of the risks that came with it. Luckily for Touré, he got through selection trials by Kolkata club Mohammedan Sporting Club and left Kerala just one month after coming here. He represented Sporting in the Calcutta Football League.

He was one of the three foreigners signed by Mohammedan Sporting Club for the 2015–16 I-League 2nd Division.

In 2016–17 I-League 2nd Division, he played for Mohammedan in the preliminary round. However, the club failed to qualify for the final stage. In April 2017, he joined Lonestar Kashmir F.C. and played in the 2016–17 I-League 2nd Division final round.

In March 2018, he joined Langsning FC and played in the 2017–18 I-League 2nd Division.

In June 2018, he returned to Mohammedan for the 2018–19 Calcutta Premier Division. During the season, Touré has attracted interest from the reigning I-League champions, Minerva Punjab.

=== Minerva Punjab ===
On 27 October 2018, Minerva Punjab signed Touré as a replacement for Aimable Nsabimana. He made his debut for the club in a 0–0 home draw against Churchill Brothers. He scored a brace against Aizawl FC and led Minerva to their first win of the season.

=== Brothers Union ===
In May 2019 Touré joined Brothers Union of Bangladesh Premier League as a mid term transfer window signing.

== Personal life ==
Touré is a very religious person and a practising Muslim.

== Career statistics ==
=== Club ===
As of 7 December 2018.

Club	Season	League			Cup		Continental		Other		Total	
Club	Season	Division	Apps	Goals	Apps	Goals	Apps	Goals	Apps	Goals	Apps	Goals
Mohammedan	2016–17	I-League 2nd Division	6	0	0	0	–		0	0	6	0
Lonestar Kashmir	2016–17	I-League 2nd Division	7	0	0	0	–		0	0	7	0
Langsning	2017–18	I-League 2nd Division	9	2	0	0	–		0	0	9	2
Minerva Punjab	2018–19	I-League	7	2	0	0	–		0	0	7	2
Career total			29	4	0	0	0	0	0	0	29	4
