= Mina Cup =

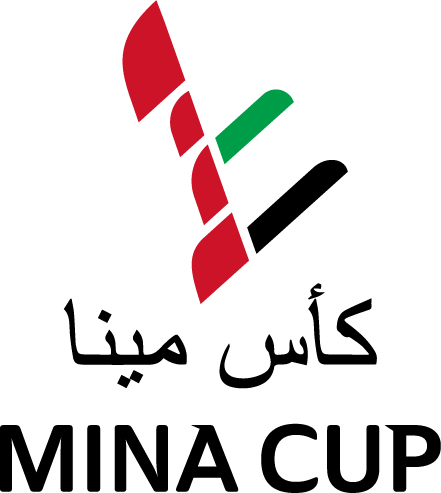
- Organiser(s): CB Football Management
- Founded: 2021; 5 years ago
- Region: United Arab Emirates
- Website: theminacup.com

The Mina Cup is an international youth football tournament held annually in Dubai, United Arab Emirates. Established in 2021, it features competitions for youth teams across multiple age categories and both genders. It has attracted elite academies from around the world. The tournament is typically held over several days of April at the JA Sports Centre in Jebel Ali. with dozens of participants. The Mina Cup is organized by CB Football Management, headed by its founder Chris Brown. It has grown into the most prestigious youth football event in the region.

== History ==
The Mina Cup was founded by Chris Brown, an English former professional player for Crewe Alexandra who had competed in Northern Ireland’s Milk Cup, which inspired him to create a similar high-caliber youth tournament in the Middle East. The inaugural Mina Cup took place in Dubai in April 2022, welcoming academy teams of Wolverhampton Wanderers, Pumas UNAM, and Sturm Graz, alongside youth sides from across Asia and Africa.

In 2023, the second Mina Cup expanded its reach. The tournament, held from March 31 to April 5, featured 32 teams across four age groups and included international entrants like Crystal Palace and Southampton, Yokohama FC, and New York Red Bulls, as well as 17 youth teams from around the UAE. An opening ceremony at the JA Beach Hotel drew over 600 players and staff. The Dubai Sports Council (DSC) partnered with the event from 2023 onward, viewing it as a model for public–private collaboration in youth sports development. In February 2023, the Mina Cup announced a strategic partnership with the SuperCupNI to exchange the champions. the winners of SuperCupNI’s U13 “Minor” section would earn a slot at the Mina Cup, and the UAE U14 champions would qualify for the SuperCupNI’s top tier the following year.

The 2024 edition marked the tournament’s third instalment, with a record 40 teams competing across five age divisions (U12 through U16). Notable participants included Newcastle United and Norwich City, Atlas FC, Chicago Fire, Mumbai City and Melbourne City from the City Football Group. These international squads faced off against top local academies that had earned their places via UAE qualifying rounds held in late 2022. The tournament’s profile was boosted by the involvement of English football legend Teddy Sheringham as an official ambassador who attended the event for the 3rd year, presenting trophies to winners. Norwich City’s youth team won the U-12 category, Newcastle United won U-13, and Melbourne City claimed the U-14 title, while UAE-based Forza FC and Barça Academy Dubai secured the U-15 and U-16 titles respectively. During the 2024 event, organisers announced plans to expand the concept, with satellite Mina Cup tournaments to be launched in other countries – including an edition in England, and prospective events in Saudi Arabia and the United States – whose winners would qualify for the Dubai final.

By 2025, the Mina Cup continued to grow in stature. The fourth edition held April 9–14, gathered 44 teams from 12 nations across six continents, totalling over 800 youth players. Prominent representatives included Liverpool, FC Barcelona, Manchester City, Rangers, Sport Club Corinthians Paulista, Columbus Crew, and Al Qadsiah. Matches took place across 5 full size pitches.

== Tournament format ==
As of 2025, the main tournament included boys U12, U13, U14, U15, and U16 divisions. In previous editions, some competitions extended up to U18 level or combined certain ages depending on participation. Teams in each category are drawn into pools for a group stage, playing round-robin matches. Based on group standings, the top teams advance to knockout rounds, culminating in an age-group final. All group winners and runners-up typically progress to the quarter-final or semi-final stage of their bracket. Matches are shorter than senior games, reflecting youth football guidelines – U12 matches are 9-a-side with two 15-minute halves, while U16 matches are full 11-a-side with two 20-minute halves.

The tournament is usually conducted over the course of a week. An opening ceremony is held to welcome all participating teams, with family-friendly activities arranged at the venue. International participating teams are invited, while UAE-based teams must earn their place via qualifying tournaments. This ensures that the final tournament features a mix of global teams and top local talent. The Dubai Sports Council supports the event’s organization to ensure it meets sporting standards and developmental goals.

The UAE’s top private academies like Fursan Hispania (run by former Real Madrid player Michel Salgado), La Liga Academy UAE, Barça Academy Dubai, Manchester City Football School (UAE), Go Pro Sports, and others regularly participate. In the 2024 tournament, the U-16 final was contested between Barça Academy Dubai and another local side, while the U-12 final saw Norwich City’s juniors face a UAE academy team. The Mina Cup aims to give aspiring young footballers a “professional” experience – from traveling abroad to playing in top-notch facilities.

== Expansion events ==
- Mini Mina: To cater to even younger players, the Mina Cup introduced Mini Mina, a series of youth tournaments for age groups below the main event. Mini Mina competitions cover ages U8 through U11, offering boys and girls at the grassroots level a chance to experience a high-quality tournament environment. The Mini Mina 2025 included U8 (boys, 5-a-side), U9 (mixed boys and girls, 7-a-side), U10 (boys, 7-a-side), and U11 (mixed, 7-a-side) categories. These events, typically held a few weeks prior to the main Mina Cup, emphasize maximum participation and development, ensuring that all teams get to play multiple games through structured progression and consolation matches.
- Mina Girls: As part of expanding opportunities for female youth players, the organizers launched Mina Girls. The Mina Girls 2024 competition brought together over 180 female players across multiple age groups. Mina Girls aims to empower young female footballers in the region by giving them their own elite platform, in line with broader efforts to grow women’s football.
- Mina Cup Futsal: In 2024, the Mina Cup extended its format to include a futsal variant, capitalizing on the popularity of indoor 5-a-side football for skill development. The first Mina Futsal Cup was held in June 2024, featuring 24 teams in two age groups (U10 and U12). This inaugural futsal championship drew youth teams from the UAE and neighboring countries such as Oman and Bahrain. The U-10 category was won by a local team, Dubai Irish FC, which earned them qualification to the European Futsal Cup. The success of the first futsal edition has led to it becoming a regular part of the Mina Cup calendar.

== Sponsorships ==
The growth of the Mina Cup has been accompanied by increasing sponsorship and institutional support. In 2024, JA Resorts & Hotels, a major UAE-based hospitality company, became the title sponsor of the Mina Cup. Alongside JA Resorts, the sportswear brand Umbro signed as an official partner, supplying the equipment. Other sponnsors include Precision Football, Noon, and Smashi Sports as a media partner. Since 2023, the DSC (the government body in charge of sports development in Dubai) has endorsed the tournament, ensuring continuity and integration into the local sports calendar.

== Media coverage ==
The National reported on the Mina Cup’s launch. Gulf News and Gulf Today, leading English-language dailies in the UAE, have regularly published articles on the Mina Cup. Internationally, specialized football media and club channels have also featured the Mina Cup. One of the notable aspects of media coverage has been broadcasting. In 2024, Smashi Sports (a digital sports channel under Augustus Media) streamed all Mina Cup games. For the 2025 edition, the tournament teamed up with the UK-based platform Recast to broadcast matches internationally; the partnership was promoted through Goal.com, which provided commentary.

== See also ==
- SuperCupNI
- Dubai Sports Council
- Youth association football
