= Souvik Das =

Indian footballer (born 1995)

Personal information
- Date of birth: 23 August 1995 (age 31)
- Place of birth: Kolkata, India
- Height: 1.68 m (5 ft 6 in)
- Position: Central midfielder

Team information
- Current team: Sc Borussia Friedrichsfeld
- Number: 8

Youth career
- Sporting Goa

Senior career*
Years	Team	Apps	(Gls)
2017–2021	RoundGlass Punjab	52	(1)
2021–2023	Sudeva Delhi	18	(0)
2023	Rajasthan United		
2023–	SC Bengaluru		

International career
- India U19
- * Club domestic league appearances and goals

Souvik Das (born 23 August 1995) is an Indian professional footballer who plays as a central midfielder for SC Bengaluru.

== Club career ==
Born in Kalyani, West Bengal, Das was a part of the youth U-19 India Elite Academy side and also a part of Sporting Goa. He was promoted to the senior squad for the 2016–17 Goa Pro League.

On 13 January 2017, Das made his professional debut for Minerva Punjab in the I-League against Aizawl. He started and played the full match despite Minerva Punjab losing 1–0.

== International career ==
Das has represented and captained India at the under-19 level.

== Career statistics ==
=== Club ===
As of 3 April 2022

Appearances and goals by club, season and competition
Club	Season	League			Cup		AFC		Total	
Club	Season	Division	Apps	Goals	Apps	Goals	Apps	Goals	Apps	Goals
Minerva Punjab	2016–17	I-League	13	1	0	0	—		13	1
Minerva Punjab	2017–18	I-League	5	0	0	0	—		5	0
Minerva Punjab	2018–19	I-League	15	0	0	0	3 (Note: Appearance(s) in AFC Cup)	0	18	0
Minerva Punjab	2019–20	I-League	5	0	0	0	—		5	0
Minerva Punjab	2020–21	I-League	14	0	0	0	—		14	0
Minerva Punjab	Total		52	1	0	0	3	0	55	1
Sudeva Delhi	2021–22	I-League	12	0	0	0	—		12	0
Sudeva Delhi	2022–23	I-League	6	0	0	0	—		6	0
Sudeva Delhi	Total		18	0	0	0	0	0	18	0
Rajasthan United	2022–23	I-League	0	0	1 (Note: Appearance(s) in Super Cup)	0	—		1	0
Career total			70	1	1	0	3	0	74	1
