= Jagpreet Singh =

Indian footballer (born 1988)

Personal information
- Full name: Jagpreet Singh
- Date of birth: 6 September 1988 (age 38)
- Place of birth: Punjab, India
- Height: 1.79 m (5 ft 10 1/2 in)
- Position: Midfielder

Team information
- Current team: Mohammedan

Senior career*
Years	Team	Apps	(Gls)
2005–2011	JCT FC		
2011–2012	Churchill Brothers	4	(0)
2012	East Bengal	4	(0)
2013–2018	Mohammedan		
2018	Minerva Punjab		

International career
2009	India U23		
2011	India	2	(0)
- * Club domestic league appearances and goals

Jagpreet Singh (born 1988) is an Indian professional football midfielder.

== Career ==
=== JCT ===
Jagpreet has been playing for JCT FC for 5 years. He played key role in JCT FC's battle to avoid relegation and was eventually called up for national probables.
