= Philip Njoku =

Nigerian footballer

Personal information
- Full name: Philip Emeka Njoku
- Date of birth: 3 June 1996 (age 30)
- Height: 1.81 m (5 ft 11 in)
- Position: Striker

Senior career*
Years	Team	Apps	(Gls)
2015–2017	Inter Turku	59	(8)
2015	→ ÅIFK (loan)	1	(1)
2018–2019	Minerva Punjab	10	(2)
2020	Gönyeli	1	(1)
- * Club domestic league appearances and goals as of 21:10, 15 November 2020 (UTC)

Philip Emeka Njoku (born 3 June 1996) is a Nigerian professional footballer who plays as a striker.

== Career ==
Njoku has played for Inter Turku, ÅIFK and Minerva Punjab.
