= Dolike Sunderpur =

- Village
- Location in Punjab, India Dolike Sunderpur (India)
- Coordinates: 31.459513°N 75.6531251°E
- Country: India
- State: Punjab
- District: Jalandhar

Government
  - Type: Panchayat raj
  - Body: Gram panchayat
- Elevation: 240 m (790 ft)

Languages
  - Official: Punjabi
- Time zone: UTC+5:30 (IST)
- ISO 3166 code: IN-PB
- Website: jalandhar.nic.in

Dolike Sunderpur is a village in Jalandhar district of Punjab State, India. It is located 24 kilometres (15 mi) from district headquarter Jalandhar and 167 kilometres (104 mi) from state capital Chandigarh. The village is administrated by a sarpanch who is an elected representative of village as per Panchayati raj (India).

== See also ==
- List of villages in India
