= Kareem Omolaja =

Nigerian footballer (born 1990)

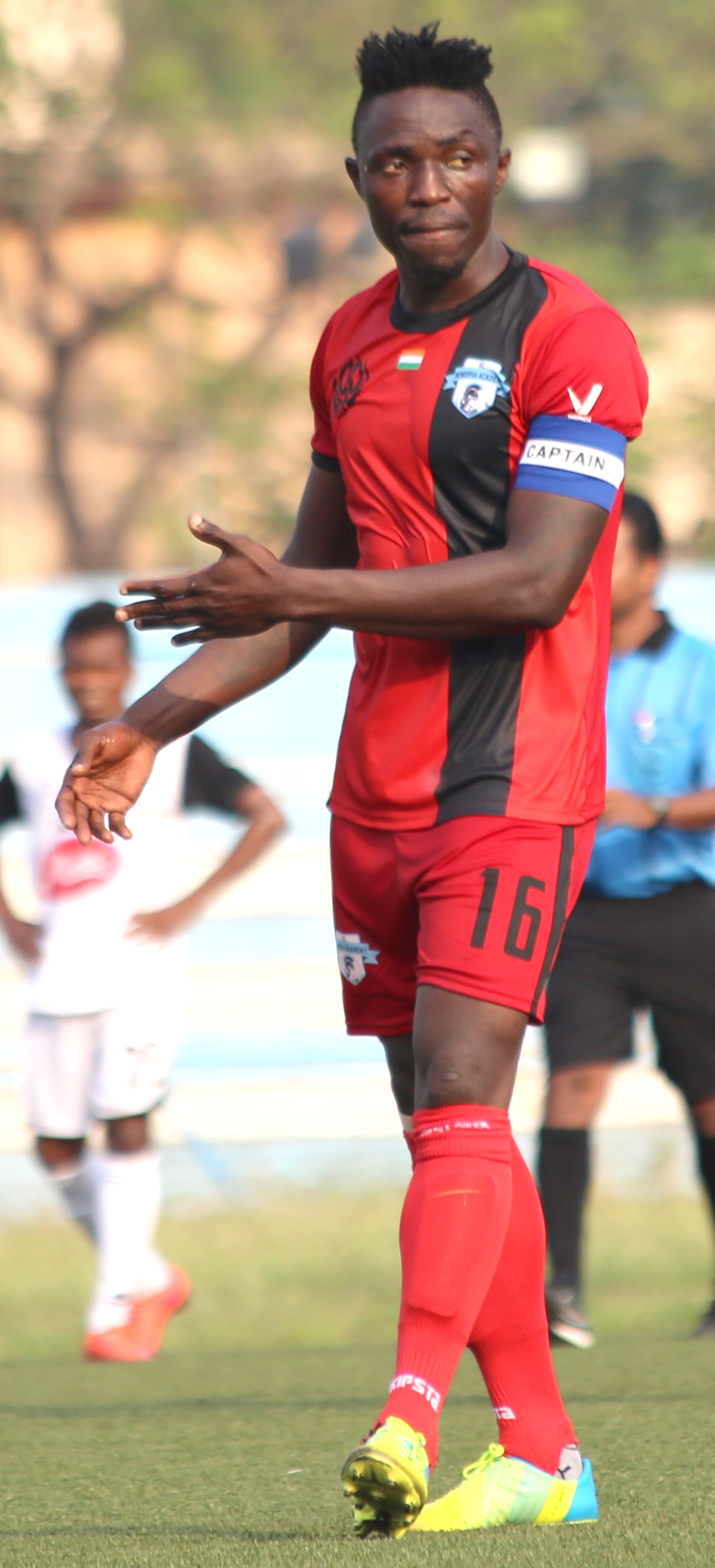
- Kareem with Minerva Punjab in 2016

Personal information
- Full name: Kareem Omolaja Nurain
- Date of birth: 18 February 1990 (age 36)
- Place of birth: Lagos, Nigeria
- Height: 5 ft 10 in (1.78 m)
- Position: Defender

Senior career*
Years	Team	Apps	(Gls)
2010−2011	JCT		
2015	Mohammedan		
2016	Minerva Punjab		
2016	Tollygunge Agragami		
2017–2019	Aizawl		
2019–2020	ARA FC		
2020	Aryan FC		
2020	Butwal Lumbini FC		
2021	Techtro Swades United FC		
2021	Machhindra F.C.		
2022	Sudeva Delhi FC		
2022–2023	Shivaji Tarun Mandal Football Sangh		
2023	Machhindra F.C.		
2023	Lalitpur City FC		
2024	Church Boys United		
2025	Machhindra F.C.		
2025	Paro FC		
2026	New Road Team		
- * Club domestic league appearances and goals

Kareem Omolaja (born 18 February 1990) is a Nigerian professional footballer who plays as a defender.

== Career ==
=== Mohammedan Sporting Club ===
In July 2015, Kareem signed for Kolkata giants Mohammedan where he was named Captain for 2015-16 season. In October Mohammedan participated in the 2015 Sheikh Kamal International Club Cup in Bangladesh under Kareem's leadership.

=== Minerva Academy FC ===
On 19 January 2016, Kareem signed for Minerva Academy F.C. prior to the final round of the 2015–16 I-League 2nd Division. On 10 May 2016, Kareem scored a hat-trick in his team's 3-2 win over Lonestar Kashmir FC at Srinagar, which was also his first in India, in the match Kareem has also captained the side. Kareem has scored another goal for his side on 19 May at Chandigarh, which gave Minerva a crucial win over Neroca FC.

=== Tollygunge Agragami FC ===
Kareem returned to Kolkata the next season, and on 7 June 2016, he signed a contract at Tollygunge Agragami to play in the Calcutta Football League 2016-17. Kareem made his first start for Tollygunge against Mohammedan Sporting on 9 August at Mohammedan Sporting Ground, where he scored one and provided the other to guide his team to a 2–1 victory.

=== Aizawl FC ===
Kareem on 14 July 2017 signed for I-League champions Aizawl FC.

== Honours ==
JCT

- Durand Cup runner-up: 2010

Minerva Academy

- I-League 2nd Division runner-up: 2015–16
