= Jorge Caicedo =

Colombian footballer (born 1995)

Personal information
- Full name: Jorge Ivan Caicedo Rodríguez
- Date of birth: 12 August 1995 (age 31)
- Height: 1.95 m (6 ft 5 in)
- Position: Defender

Team information
- Current team: Manchego

Youth career
- América de Cali
- Cyclones Cali

Senior career*
Years	Team	Apps	(Gls)
2017	Thinadhoo Sports	9	(1)
2018–2019	Minerva Punjab	14	(1)
2019–2020	Avilés Industrial		
2020–2021	Alcalá	9	(0)
2022	Da Grande		
2022–2023	Vibonese	10	(0)
2023	Atlético Melilla	1	(0)
2023–2024	Ayamonte	24	(1)
2025	Dhangadhi	5	(0)
2025–	Manchego	9	(0)
- * Club domestic league appearances and goals as of 9 November 2025

Jorge Iván Caicedo Rodríguez (born 12 August 1995), sometimes known as El Kaiser, is a Colombian professional footballer who plays as a defender for Spanish Tercera Federación club Manchego.

== Career ==
=== Minerva Punjab ===
Jorge Caicedo made his professional debut in India, playing for Minerva Punjab in the I-League.

=== Real Avilés CF ===
On 12 July 2019, he joined the Spanish side Real Avilés CF which plays in Tercera División.

== Career statistics ==
=== Club ===
As of 5 December 2018.

Club	Season	League			Cup		Continental		Other		Total	
Club	Season	Division	Apps	Goals	Apps	Goals	Apps	Goals	Apps	Goals	Apps	Goals
Thinadhoo Sports	2017	Dhivehi Premier League	9	1	1 (Note: Appearances in the President's Cup)	0	–		0	0	10	1
Minerva Punjab	2018–19	I-League	2	0	0	0	–		0	0	2	0
Career total			11	1	1	0	0	0	0	0	12	1
