= Helsinki Cup =

Annually held youth football tournament in Helsinki, Finland

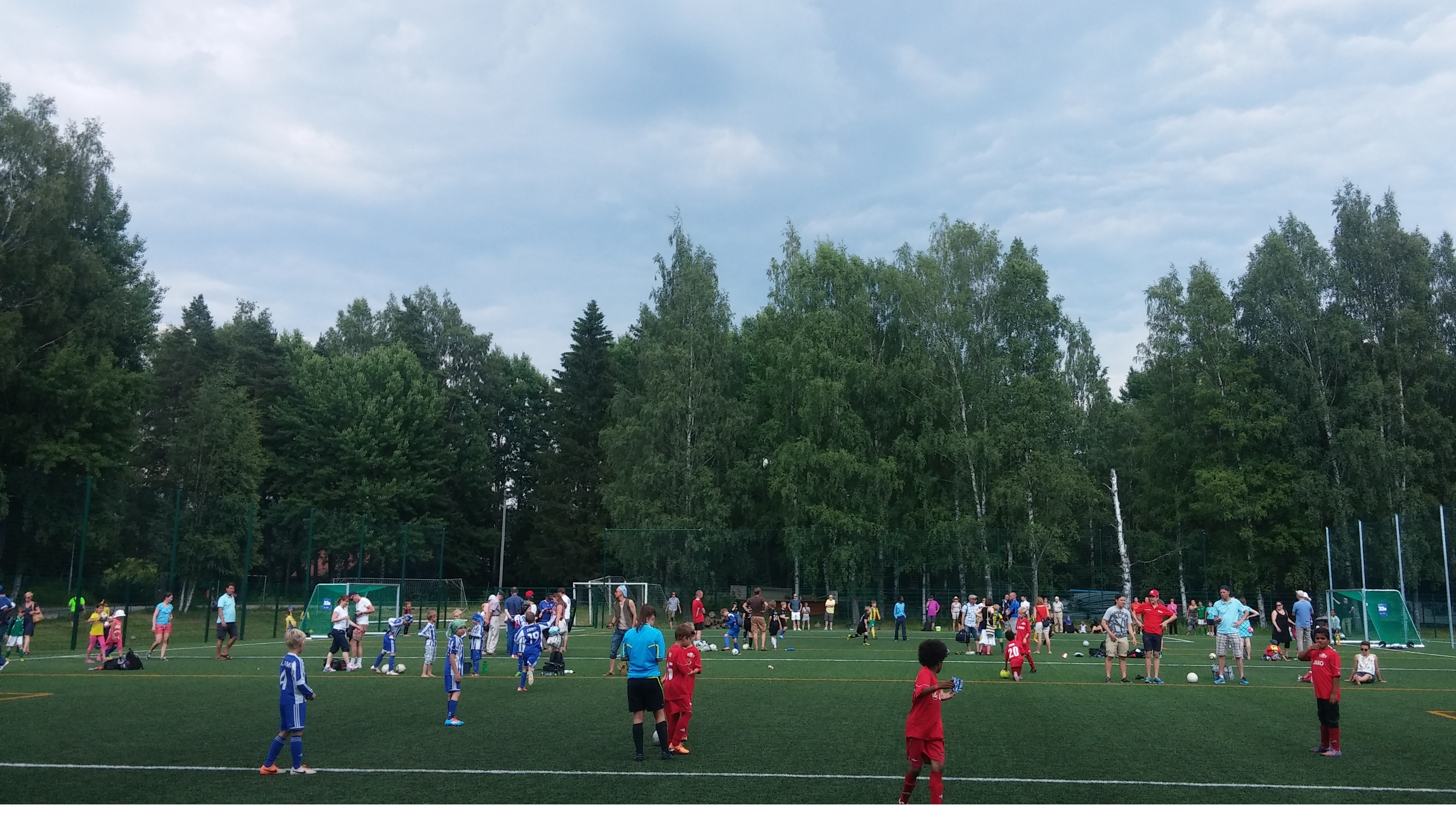
Helsinki Cup in 2014

The Helsinki Cup is an international youth football tournament, held each year in Helsinki, Finland during June/July. It was held for the first time in 1976.

The first Helsinki Cup was a rather modest tournament by today's standards, as 211 teams from five countries took part in it. Today it is the third largest junior football tournament in Europe, with 1796 teams from 21 countries taking part in the 2023 tournament.

== See also ==
- Football in Finland
