= Nidhin Lal =

Indian footballer

Personal information
- Full name: Nidhin Lal
- Date of birth: 25 December 1990 (age 35)
- Place of birth: chayoth Kerala, India
- Height: 1.83 m (6 ft 0 in)
- Position: Goalkeeper

Team information
- Current team: Minerva Punjab
- Number: 22

Senior career*
Years	Team	Apps	(Gls)
2011–2017	Mumbai	33	(0)
2015	→Chennaiyin FC (loan)	0	(0)
2017–2018	Shillong Lajong	7	(0)
2018–2019	Minerva Punjab	3	(0)
- * Club domestic league appearances and goals as of 11 February 2018

Nidhin Lal (born 25 December 1990 in Kerala) is a former Indian footballer who most recently played for Minerva Punjab in the I-League.

== Career ==
=== Mumbai ===
Nidhin has played for Tamil Nadu and stood 3rd in the Santosh Trophy. He has played for Clubs such as Indian Bank and Pune F.C. In the summer of 2011 he signed with Mumbai F.C. of the I-League and made his first team debut in the I-League against Mohun Bagan on 6 November 2011.

=== Chennaiyin FC ===
In July 2015 Lal was drafted to play for Chennaiyin FC in the 2015 Indian Super League.

== Legal issues ==
In January 2020, Lal was arrested by police in Vasco for running a prostitution parlour alongside Shyni Joseph. The pair were granted bail later in the month.

== Career statistics ==
=== Club ===
Statistics accurate as of 11 July 2015

Club	Season	League		Cup		International		Total	
Club	Season	Apps	C S	Apps	C S	Apps	C S	Apps	C S
Mumbai	2011-12	6	1	0	0	0	0	6	1
Mumbai	2012-13	5	1	0	0	0	0	5	1
Mumbai	2013-14	10	2	0	0	0	0	10	2
Mumbai	2014-15	12	3	0	0	0	0	12	3
Career total		33	7	0	0	0	0	33	7

Apps = Appearances || C S = Clean Sheets
