= Aakash Sangwan =

Indian footballer (born 1995)

Personal information
- Date of birth: 28 October 1995 (age 31)
- Place of birth: Jind, Haryana, India
- Height: 1.78 m (5 ft 10 in)
- Position: Left-back

Team information
- Current team: Goa
- Number: 27

Youth career
- Minerva Punjab

Senior career*
Years	Team	Apps	(Gls)
2017–2019	Minerva Punjab	24	(1)
2020	Churchill Brothers	3	(0)
2020–2022	Punjab	32	(0)
2022–2024	Chennaiyin	34	(2)
2024–	Goa	36	(1)

International career^{‡}
2024–	India	1	(0)
- * Club domestic league appearances and goals as of 17:30, 18 May 2026 (UTC) ‡ National team caps and goals as of 19:30, September 2024 (UTC)

Aakash Sangwan (born 28 October 1995) is an Indian professional footballer who plays as a left-back for Indian Super League club Goa and the India national team.

== Club career ==
Sangwan is a product of the Minerva Punjab youth system when it was known as Minerva Academy. Sangwan stayed with Minerva Punjab when they were promoted to the I-League and made his professional debut for the club on 30 April 2017 against DSK Shivajians. He started the match and played 41 minutes as Minerva Punjab drew the match 4–4.

The next season, Sangwan scored his first professional goal against Aizawl on 26 February 2018. His 51st-minute strike was the first in a 2–0 victory which brought Minerva Punjab to the top of the I-League table. The club would eventually go on to confirm their championship, the first of Sangwan's professional career.

Sangwan made his first professional appearance for RoundGlass Punjab on 9 January 2021 against Aizawl FC.

== International career ==
Sangwan made his international debut for the India national team on 12 October 2024, in an 1–1 tie verses Vietnam.

== Career statistics ==
=== Club ===
As of 20 April 2024

Club	Season	League			Cup		AFC		Total	
Club	Season	Division	Apps	Goals	Apps	Goals	Apps	Goals	Apps	Goals
Minerva Punjab	2016–17	I-League	1	0	0	0	–		1	0
Minerva Punjab	2017–18	I-League	5	1	1 (Note: Appearance(s) in Super Cup)	0	–		6	1
Minerva Punjab	2018–19	I-League	18	0	0	0	6 (Note: Appearance(s) in AFC Champions League) (Note: Appearance(s) in AFC Cup)	0	24	0
Minerva Punjab	Total		24	1	1	0	6	0	31	1
Churchill Brothers	2019–20	I-League	3	0	0	0	–		3	0
RoundGlass Punjab	2020–21	I-League	15	0	0	0	–		15	0
RoundGlass Punjab	2021–22	I-League	17	0	0	0	–		17	0
RoundGlass Punjab	Total		32	0	0	0	0	0	32	0
Chennaiyin	2022–23	Indian Super League	19	0	7 (Note: Appearance(s) in Durand Cup)	0	–		26	0
Chennaiyin	2023–24	Indian Super League	15	2	7	0	–		22	2
Chennaiyin	Total		34	2	14	0	0	0	48	2
Goa	2024–25	Indian Super League	0	0	0	0	–		0	0
Career total			93	3	15	0	6	0	114	3

== Honours ==
Minerva Punjab

- I-League: 2017–18
