= Arshdeep Singh (footballer, born 1997) =

Indian professional Footballer

Personal information
- Full name: Arshdeep Singh Saini
- Date of birth: 6 October 1997 (age 29)
- Place of birth: Chandigarh, India
- Height: 1.81 m (5 ft 11 in)
- Position: Goalkeeper

Team information
- Current team: Punjab
- Number: 1

Youth career
- Chandigarh Football Academy
- AIFF Elite Academy

Senior career*
Years	Team	Apps	(Gls)
2015–2019	Minerva Punjab	26	(0)
2019–2022	Odisha	33	(0)
2022–2024	Goa	17	(0)
2024–2025	Hyderabad	16	(0)
2025–	Punjab	14	(0)
- * Club domestic league appearances and goals as of 16:30, 19 October 2026 (UTC)

Arshdeep Singh Saini (born 6 October 1997) is an Indian professional footballer who plays as a goalkeeper for Indian Super League club Punjab.

== Club career ==
=== Minerva Academy ===
==== 2015—16: Professional Debut ====
Singh began his career with the AIFF Elite Academy, playing in various competitions. On 1 November 2015, He joined Minerva Academy FC who were about to participate in I-League 2nd Division. On 11 December 2015, he made his professional debut against PIFA Sports FC in a western conference game. He kept his first professional cleansheet as the match ended in a 3–0 win. He started in all final round games and kept three cleansheets as Minerva finished second after a 3–1 loss to Dempo SC.

==== 2016—18: Durand Cup and I-League Debut ====
He made his Durand Cup debut on 30 August 2016 where despite a 2–0 loss to Gangtok Himalayan SC he managed to impress. He also played the next game which ended in a 3–0 loss to Indian Navy. He missed next three games due to a sudden illness. Despite finishing second in I-League 2 Minerva were promoted to I-League after Dempo SC withdrew. On 21 January 2017, Singh made his I-League debut against Shillong Lajong. He started and played the full match as Minerva lost 2–1. He started only in four games conceding six goals with no cleansheets.

In 2017–18 I-League season, he was again a backup keeper making only three starts but helped Minerva win their first ever I-League title. This was young Arshdeep and Minerva Punjab's first ever major trophy

==== 2018—19: AFC Cup and Departure ====
On 22 September 2018, he extended his contract for another season. He started the season in a 2–2 draw against Shillong Lajong. He started in eight games keeping two cleansheets with Minerva finishing ninth in the league. Since, Minerva were winners of previous I-League season they qualified for 2019 AFC Champions League qualifying play-offs. However, he was on the bench in the 4–0 loss to Iranian club Saipa FC in preliminary round 2.

As a result, Minerva qualified to play in AFC Cup group stage. On 3 April 2019, he made his continental debut in the first game against Chennaiyin FC which ended in a 0–0 stalemate. After being benched for next game, he played in next two games against Manang Marshyangdi Club which both ended in a draw. He suffered a nose injury in the next game against Chennaiyin after colliding with C. K. Vineeth which made him being substituted off in the 11th minute in an eventual 1–1 draw. Hence, he missed the last game against Abahani Limited Dhaka, the same game where he was benched.

=== Odisha FC ===
On 19 July 2019, he joined newly rebranded Odisha FC on a 3-year deal. He made his debut on 26 October 2019 in a 2–1 loss to NorthEast United FC which was also his ISL debut. He made thirty three appearances for Odisha during his three seasons all coming in league but managing to keep only five cleansheets and Odisha even finished last in 2020-21 ISL season when he was the first choice keeper.

=== FC Goa ===
==== 2022—23: Super Cup Debut ====
On 30 June 2022, FC Goa completed the signing of Arshdeep Singh on a two-year deal. On 21 October 2022, he made his debut for Goa coming as a fifty-ninth-minute substitute for Dheeraj Singh who suffered a head injury in a 2–0 win over Chennaiyin FC. He started in the next game against Hyderabad FC which ended in a 1–0 loss. He made his Super Cup debut on 10 April 2023 in a 5–3 loss to Jamshedpur FC. But managed to keep cleansheets in next two games against Gokulam Kerala and Mohun Bagan which both ended in a 1–0 win.

==== 2023—24 ====
He started the next season with a cleansheet in 6–0 hammering over Shillong Lajong in Durand Cup. He also started in the first game of 2023—24 ISL against his former club and newly promoted Punjab FC and managed another cleansheet in a 1–0 win.

==== 2024—25 ====
On 26 June, Arshdeep extended his contract till the end of the 2025–26 season. He started the season with a cleansheet against A-League side Brisbane Roar in a 1–0 victory at 2024 Bandodkar Trophy.

== Career statistics ==
=== Club ===
As of 21 October 2024

Club	Season	League			Cup		AFC		Total	
Club	Season	Division	Apps	Goals	Apps	Goals	Apps	Goals	Apps	Goals
Minerva Punjab	2015–16	I-League 2	11	0	0	0	—		11	0
Minerva Punjab	2016–17	I-League	4	0	2 (Note: Appearance(s) in Durand Cup)	0	—		6	0
Minerva Punjab	2017–18	I-League	3	0	0	0	—		3	0
Minerva Punjab	2018–19	I-League	8	0	0	0	4 (Note: Appearance(s) in AFC Cup)	0	12	0
Minerva Punjab	Total		26	0	2	0	4	0	32	0
Odisha	2019–20	Indian Super League	9	0	0	0	—		9	0
Odisha	2020–21	Indian Super League	16	0	0	0	—		16	0
Odisha	2021–22	Indian Super League	8	0	0	0	—		8	0
Odisha	Total		33	0	0	0	0	0	33	0
Goa	2022–23	Indian Super League	2	0	3 (Note: Appearance(s) in Super Cup)	0	—		5	0
Goa	2023–24	Indian Super League	15	0	1	0	—		16	0
Goa	Total		17	0	4	0	0	0	21	0
Hyderabad	2024–25	Indian Super League	4	0	0	0	—		4	0
Career total			80	0	6	0	4	0	90	0

== Honours ==
Minerva Punjab

- I-League: 2017–18
