= Juan Quero =

Spanish footballer

Personal information
- Full name: Juan Quero Barraso
- Date of birth: 17 October 1984 (age 42)
- Place of birth: Vallecas, Spain
- Height: 1.66 m (5 ft 5 in)
- Position: Attacking midfielder

Team information
- Current team: Real Aranjuez
- Number: 2

Youth career
- Real Madrid
- 2001–2003: Las Rozas

Senior career*
Years	Team	Apps	(Gls)
2003–2005	Santa Ana		
2005–2006	Alcorcón	35	(4)
2006	Poli Ejido	0	(0)
2006–2007	Alcorcón	26	(2)
2007–2009	Numancia	53	(3)
2009–2012	Rayo Vallecano	31	(2)
2010–2011	→ Elche (loan)	0	(0)
2011	→ Las Palmas (loan)	17	(0)
2011–2012	→ Córdoba (loan)	18	(0)
2013	Dubai Club	1	(0)
2013	Buriram United	9	(2)
2013	→ Chonburi (loan)	8	(1)
2014	Oriente Petrolero	18	(2)
2014	Ratchaburi	14	(2)
2015	Hércules	11	(1)
2015	Birkirkara	9	(0)
2016–2017	DSK Shivajians	28	(5)
2017–2019	Fuenlabrada	42	(2)
2019	Minerva Punjab	5	(1)
2020	Alcobendas Sport	2	(0)
2020–	Real Aranjuez	6	(0)
- * Club domestic league appearances and goals as of 20:10, 1 March 2021 (UTC)

Juan Quero Barraso (born 17 October 1984) is a Spanish footballer who plays as an attacking midfielder for Real Aranjuez.

== Club career ==
Born in Vallecas, Madrid, Quero began playing football for Real Madrid, joining lowly DAV Santa Ana (fourth division) after his unsuccessful youth spell. In the summer of 2005 he signed for another team from Madrid, AD Alcorcón, moving up to the third level.

Quero signed with division two side Polideportivo Ejido for the 2006–07 season. However, a few months later, the Royal Spanish Football Federation deemed the deal illegal, and the player returned to his previous club without any official appearances for the Andalusians.

In 2007–08, Quero finally played in the second tier, being an important attacking weapon as CD Numancia returned to La Liga after a three-year absence. He produced roughly the same numbers in the following campaign, but did not find the net and the Sorians were relegated; his debut in the Spanish top flight came on 14 September 2008, in a 3–4 loss away loss against Real Madrid.

Quero competed in the second division in the following years, representing Rayo Vallecano, Elche CF, UD Las Palmas and Córdoba CF. In 2013 he moved abroad, starting with Dubai CSC then switching to the Thai League 1. He played for I-League club Minerva Punjab in 2019.

During season 2020–21, Quero retired from football after having been diagnosed with a heart arrhythmia.

== Club statistics ==
As of match played on 29 April 2018

Club	Season	League			Cup		Continental		Total	
Club	Season	Division	Apps	Goals	Apps	Goals	Apps	Goals	Apps	Goals
Alcorcón	2005–06	Segunda División B	35	4	—		—		35	4
Alcorcón	2006–07	Segunda División B	26	2	—		—		26	2
Alcorcón	Total		61	6	—		—		61	6
Numancia	2007–08	Segunda División	28	3	1	0	—		29	3
Numancia	2008–09	La Liga	25	0	2	0	—		27	0
Numancia	Total		53	3	3	0	—		56	3
Rayo Vallecano	2009–10	Segunda División	31	2	5	0	—		36	2
Elche (loan)	2010–11	Segunda División	0	0	2	0	—		2	0
Las Palmas (loan)	2010–11	Segunda División	17	0	0	0	—		17	0
Córdoba (loan)	2011–12	Segunda División	18	0	5	1	—		23	1
Dubai	2012–13	UAE Arabian Gulf League	1	0	1	0	—		2	0
Buriram United	2013	Thai League 1	9	2	0	0	—		9	2
Chonburi (loan)	2013	Thai League 1	8	1	0	0	—		8	1
Oriente Petrolero	2013–14	LFPB	18	2	0	0	2 (Note: Appearances in Copa Libertadores)	0	20	2
Ratchaburi	2014	Thai League 1	14	2	0	0	—		14	2
Hércules	2014–15	Segunda División B	11	1	0	0	2 (Note: Appearances in Promotion Play-offs)	0	13	1
Birkirkara	2015–16	Maltese Premier League	9	1	1	0	—		10	1
DSK Shivajians	2015–16	I-League	10	3	—		—		10	3
DSK Shivajians	2016–17	I-League	18	2	—		—		18	2
DSK Shivajians	Total		28	5	—		—		28	5
Fuenlabrada	2017–18	Segunda División B	32	2	4	1	—		36	3
Career total			310	26	21	2	4	0	335	28

== Honours ==
Numancia

- Segunda División: 2007–08
