= Aimable Nsabimana =

Rwandan footballer

Personal information
- Full name: Albert Aimable Nsabimana
- Date of birth: 6 June 1997 (age 29)
- Place of birth: Rwanda
- Position: Centre-back

Senior career*
Years	Team	Apps	(Gls)
2015–2016	Marines F.C.		
2016–2018	APR FC		
2018	Minerva Punjab	0	(0)

International career^{‡}
2017–	Rwanda	5	(0)
- * Club domestic league appearances and goals as of 24 September 2018 ‡ National team caps and goals as of 24 September 2018

Aimable Nsabimana (born 6 July 1997) is a Rwandan professional footballer who plays as a central defender for the Rwanda national football team.

== Club career ==
The versatile defender had joined APR in July 2016 from Marines FC and went on to become a key member of the military side before he was ravaged by a series of injuries since the beginning of the 2017–18 season. During his two-year stint with APR, the hard-hitting defender helped the club to clinch Peace Cup and the league titles.

=== Minerva Punjab ===
In September 2018, he joined I-League club Minerva Punjab FC.

== International career ==
He made his debut for the national team on 15 July 2017 in the 2018 African Nations Championship qualification 2nd round match against Tanzania.

== Career statistics ==
As of 11 September 2018

Club	Season	League			League Cup		Domestic Cup		Continental		Total	
Club	Season	Division	Apps	Goals	Apps	Goals	Apps	Goals	Apps	Goals	Apps	Goals
Minerva Punjab	2018–19	I-League	0	0	—	—	0	0	—	—	0	0
Career total			0	0	0	0	0	0	0	0	0	0

== Honours ==
Armée Patriotique Rwandaise

- Rwanda National Football League: 2015–16
