= Minerva Academy FC =

Multi-sports club in Punjab, India

Minerva Academy
- Full name: Minerva Academy Football Club
- Nicknames: The Warriors; The Factory
- Founded: 2005; 21 years ago (as Minerva Academy)
- Ground: Minerva Academy Ground
- Owner: Ranjit Bajaj
- League: Punjab Youth Football League; Indian Youth League
- Website: minervaacademyfc.in
Home colours	Away colours	Third colours

Minerva Academy Football Club (often referred to as Minerva Punjab) is an Indian professional football club based in Mohali/Chandigarh, Punjab. It is part of the multi-sports club which also has cricket and futsal teams. The club's football section predominantly competed in the Punjab State Super League.

Minerva previously participated in the I-League, then the highest division of the Indian football league system. After selling Punjab FC to Roundglass Sports, owner Ranjit Bajaj bought stakes in Delhi FC. However, Minerva Academy remained active since its inception.

After being promoted into the I-League in 2016, the academy based club was rebranded as Minerva Punjab FC, and in 2019 the football section was relabeled as Punjab FC. The club has won the I-League title once, in 2017–18. Widely known as "the factory" of Indian football, Minerva is one of the most successful sports academies in the country.

== History and overview ==
=== 2005–2020 ===
The club was established in 2005 as Minerva Academy. It was founded as a purpose of reviving the glory of the Minerva Club, a football team of Minerva Public School in Mohali, that emerged as one of the most formidable in the state of Punjab. Until 2013, it was operated as an amateur six-a-side team for local players, alongside appearing in age-grouped tournaments.

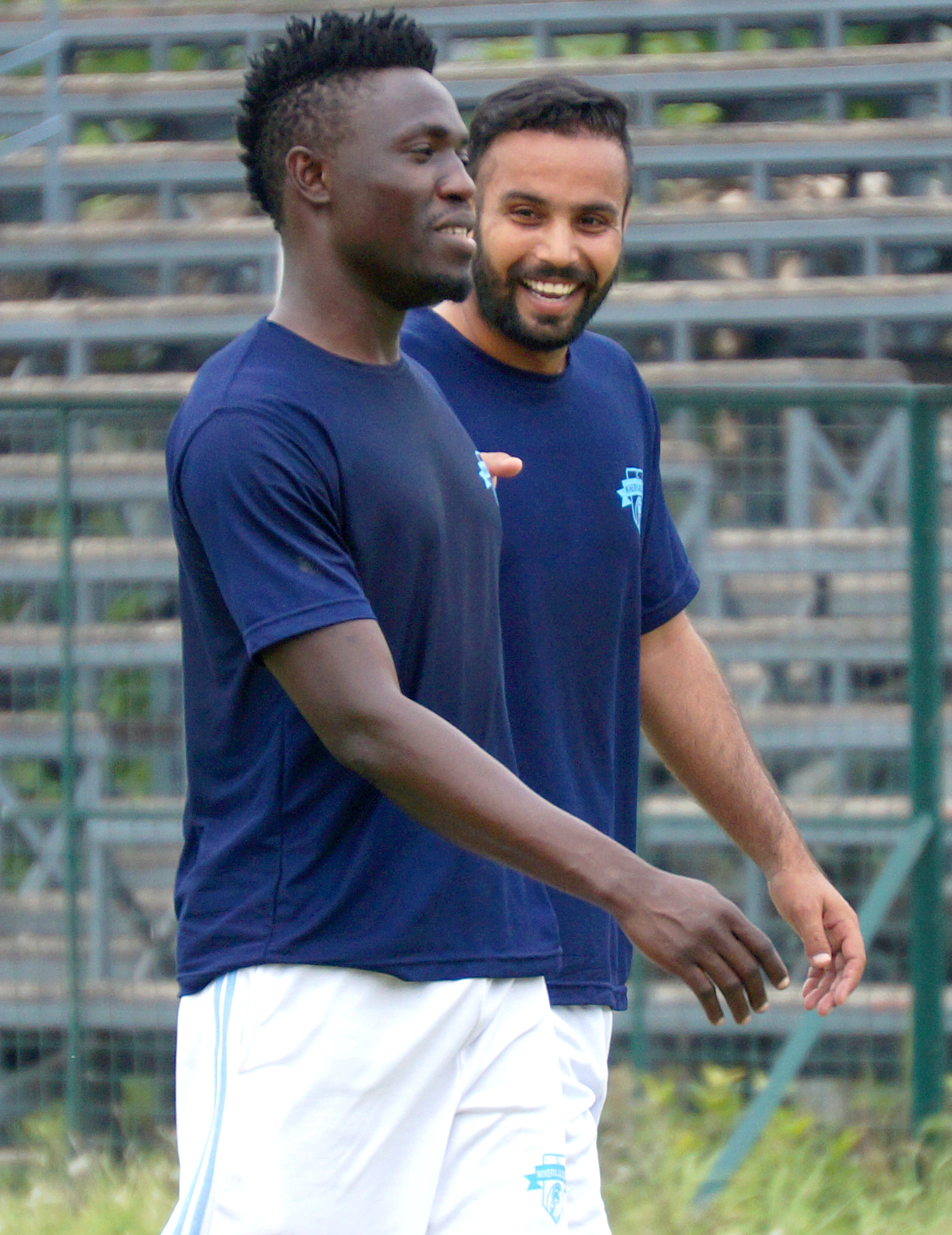
Kareem Omolaja and Sehijpal Singh in training with Minerva Punjab in 2016.

Minerva initially fielded players in various regional competitions in Punjab and beyond, while club's first major tournament at the national level was the I-League 2nd Division in 2015–16. On 22 November 2015, the club began league journey with a 2–0 win against Kenkre. Goalkeeper Arshdeep Singh maintained cleen-sheets as Minerva thrashed PIFA 3–0 on 11 December. They reached final round of the tournament and maintained good form, but ended campaign earning second place after a 3–1 defeat to Dempo. They were promoted to the I-League after an impressive stint at the 2nd Division. Minerva later took part in 2016 Durand Cup, getting the direct entry. They earned only point from a 2–2 tie with Army Green in the last group stage fixture, hence couldn't qualify for the semi-finals. Minerva along with Chennai City was promoted to the I-League, after the withdrawal of Dempo. The club ended its 2016–17 I-League season at the second last position. In December 2016, Minerva roped in Colm Joseph Toal as technical director. In October 2017, Bollywood actor Rannvijay Singha was unveiled as co-owner of the club.

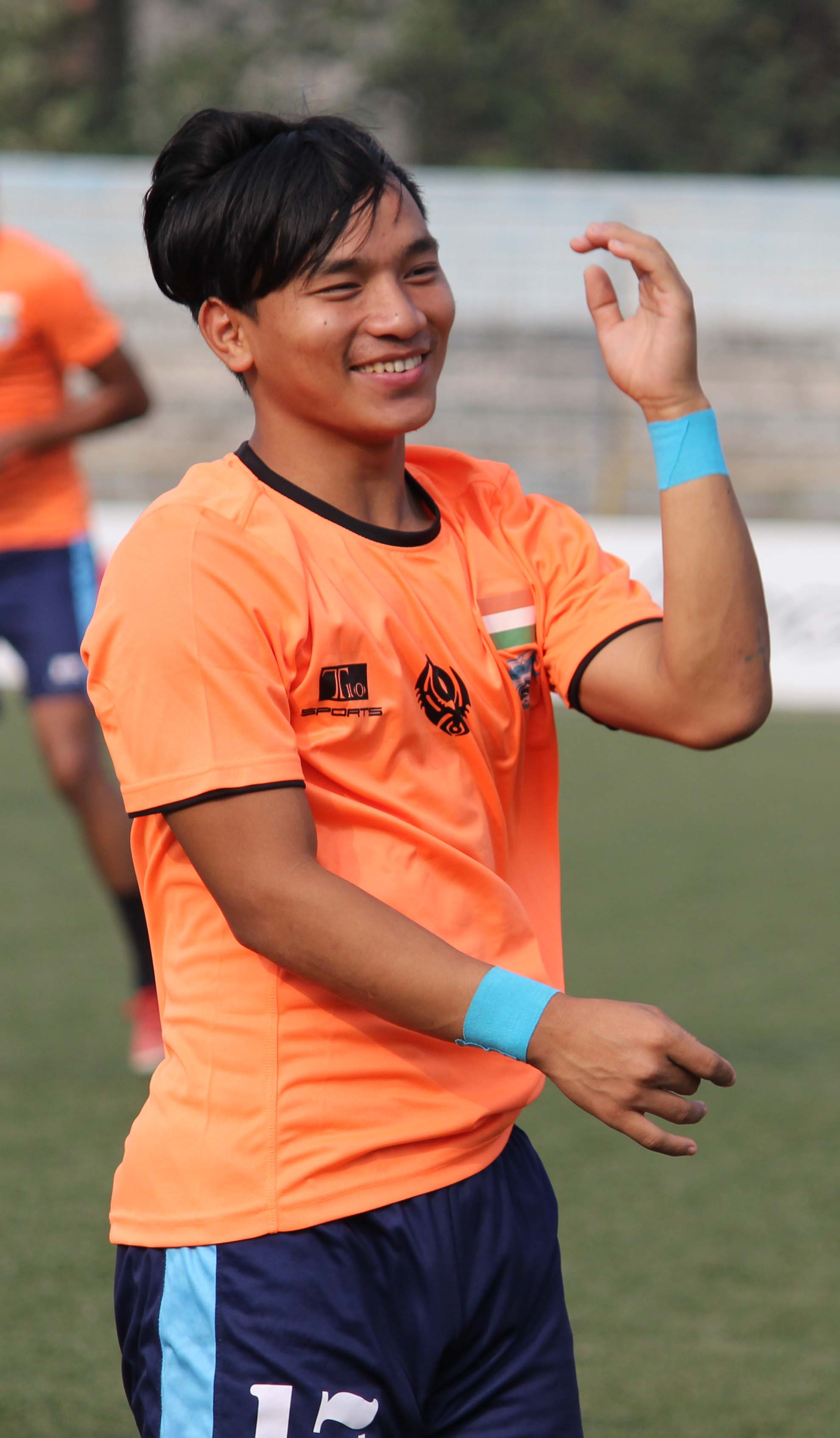
Baoringdao Bodo in Minerva's away kit in 2017.

Next season, surprising everyone, Minerva clinched the I-League title. It was their first ever top division title. They became the first club from North India to win the league since 1996. The title made the team qualify for their first-ever continental tournament. Minerva appeared in the group stage of the 2019 AFC Cup, alongside Chennaiyin, starting from the preliminary round 2. However, they lost to Iranian club Saipa in the qualifying play-offs of the 2019 AFC Champions League. On 3 April 2019, Minerva kicked-off their group stage campaign against Chennaiyin, which ended in a 0–0 stalemate. On 17 April, the club held Abahani Limited Dhaka of Bangladesh by 2–2 at Bangabandhu National Stadium. They maintained undefeated form, drew both home and away games with Nepali side Manang Marshyangdi. They drew another game with Chennaiyin, this time 1–1 in Guwahati. In the last group stage fixture, the club lost 0–1 to Abahani. Minerva was also placed in the round of 16 of the 2018 Indian Super Cup, in which they lost to Jamshedpur by 4–5.

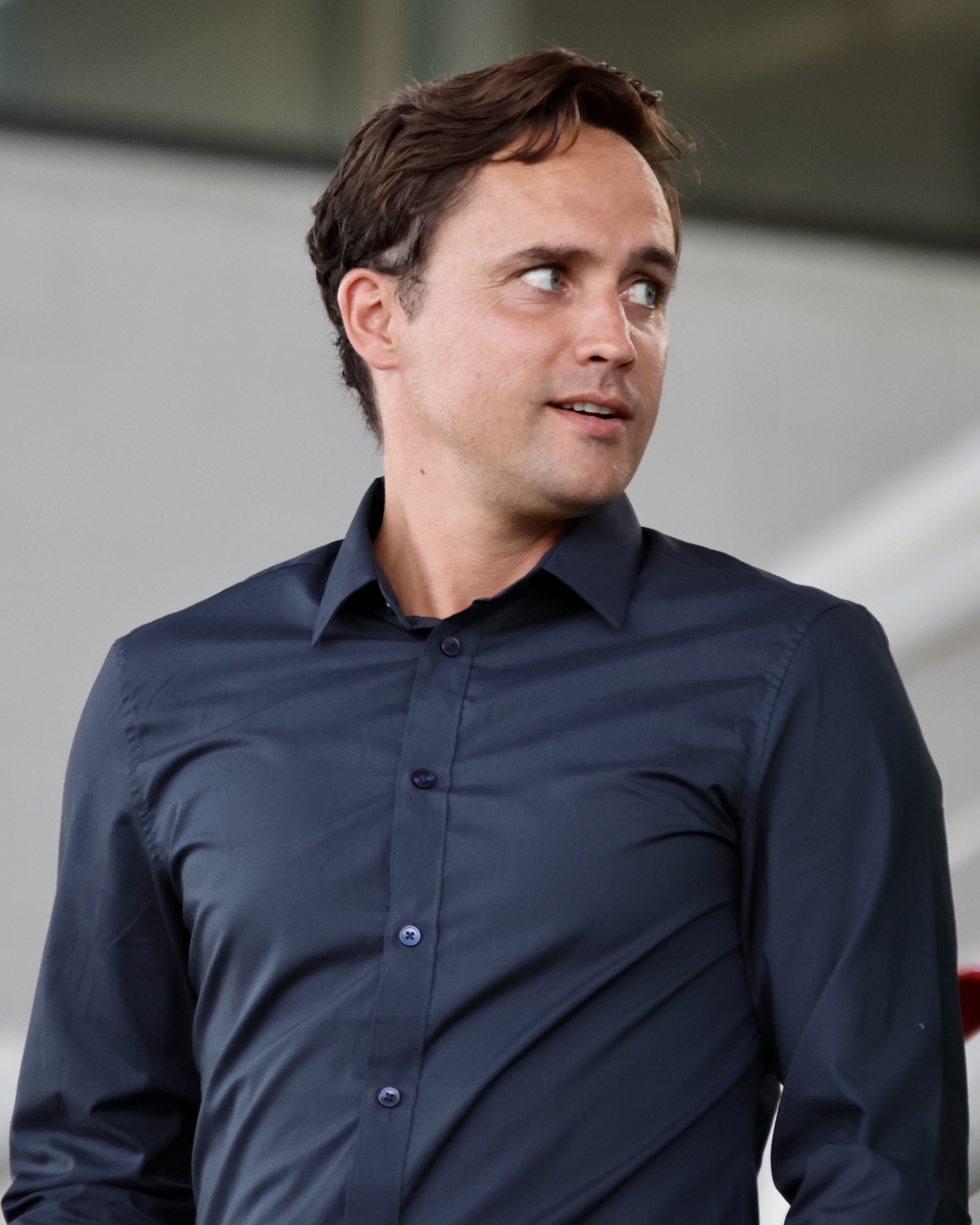
Paul Munster guided Minerva in 2018–19 season as both technical director and head coach.

In July 2018, Minerva roped in noted Indian manager Sukhwinder Singh as technical director. On 8 August 2018, Northern Irish manager Paul Munster was appointed by the club. The club won the Punjab State Super League for the first time after becoming undefeated in 11 games, and later went on to win the J&K Invitational Cup, jointly with Real Kashmir. In February 2019, Minerva signed a strategic partnership with Bundesliga club Borussia Mönchengladbach, aiming football development at grassroots level. On 8 February 2019, Minerva announced Munster's departure. In the 2018–19 I-League, the club managed to win four of their twenty fixtures and finished ninth in the league table. They were placed in the 2019 Indian Super Cup qualifying round, but refused to play protesting against uncertainty of the I-League clubs' future in Indian football. Thereafter, they were also not invited to play the 2019 Durand Cup. On 30 October 2019, announcement was made that after a partnership agreement with RoundGlass Sports Private Ltd., the club has been renamed as Punjab Football Club. From mid-2019 until May 2020, the club was coached by Yan Law. After losing the I-League spot, Minerva started playing football again in Punjab football league system with its youth age groups. It is the only Indian club to win all age group national titles in the same year, 2017–18, winning U13, U15, U18 and the senior I-League.

=== 2020–present ===
This year we have changed the name of the club from Minerva Punjab FC to Punjab FC. I have sold Punjab FC and not Minerva FC. We are now registered with Punjab Football Association as Minerva Academy Football Club again.

— Ranjit Bajaj, owner of Minerva, on club's rebranding in 2020.

RoundGlass Sports bought 50% of Minerva Academy's share earlier; In 2020, they bought remaining 50% from owners Ranjit and Heena Bajaj to form RoundGlass Punjab a year later.

In November 2020, Minerva Academy was accredited as Khelo India State Centre of Excellence (KISCE) by the Ministry of Youth Affairs and Sports. The same year, Sports Authority of India (SAI) signed Memorandum of Understanding with Minerva for a period of four years under the "Khelo India Talent Identification and Development Program". The club became a regular participant in the Shaheed-e-Azam Sardar Bhagat Singh Memorial Tournament.

== Crest and colours ==
Club crest and emblem of Minerva depicting emblems of the three armed forces, the Sikh khanda symbol and the profile of Minerva – the Roman goddess of wisdom.

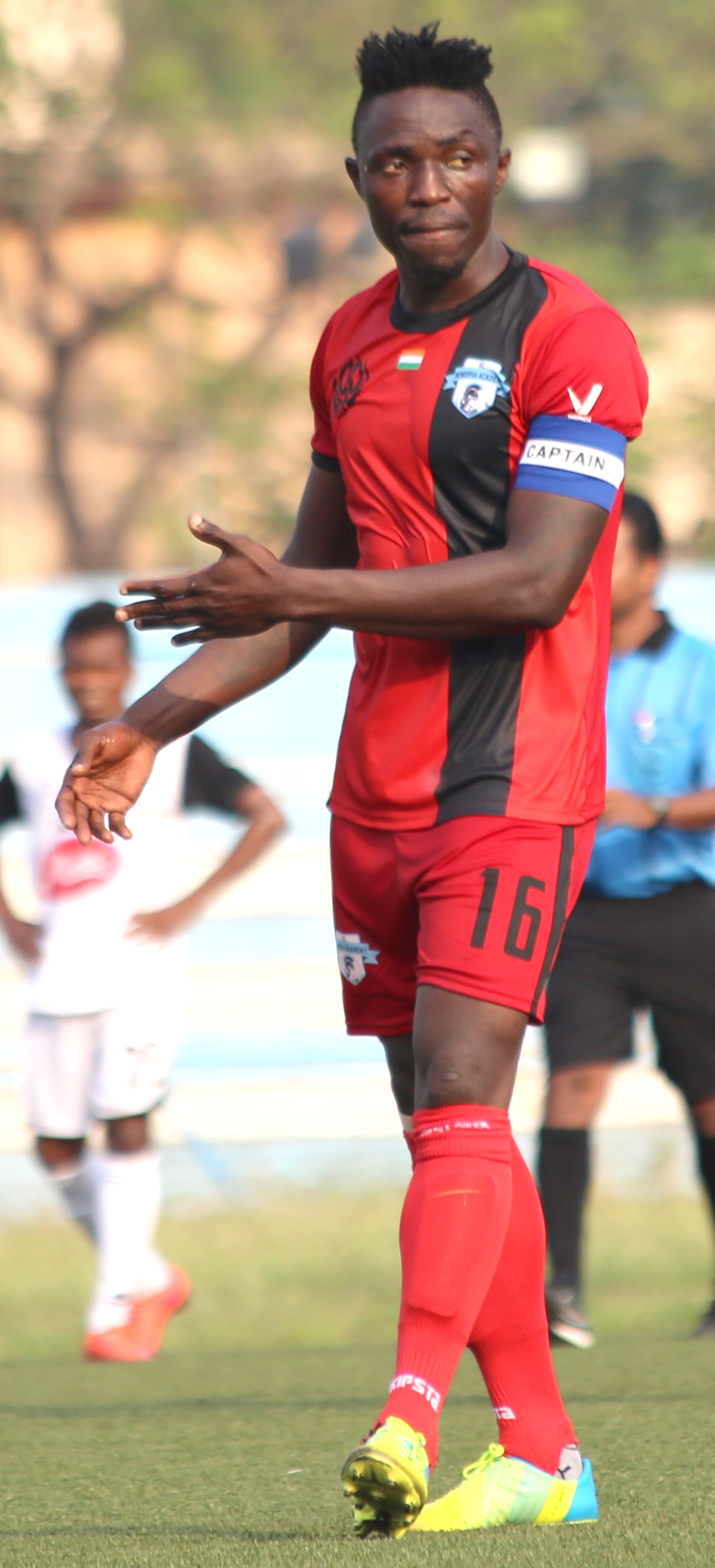
Kareem Omolaja in Minerva's away kit in 2016

Club colours are predominantly blue, white and black.

== Stadiums ==
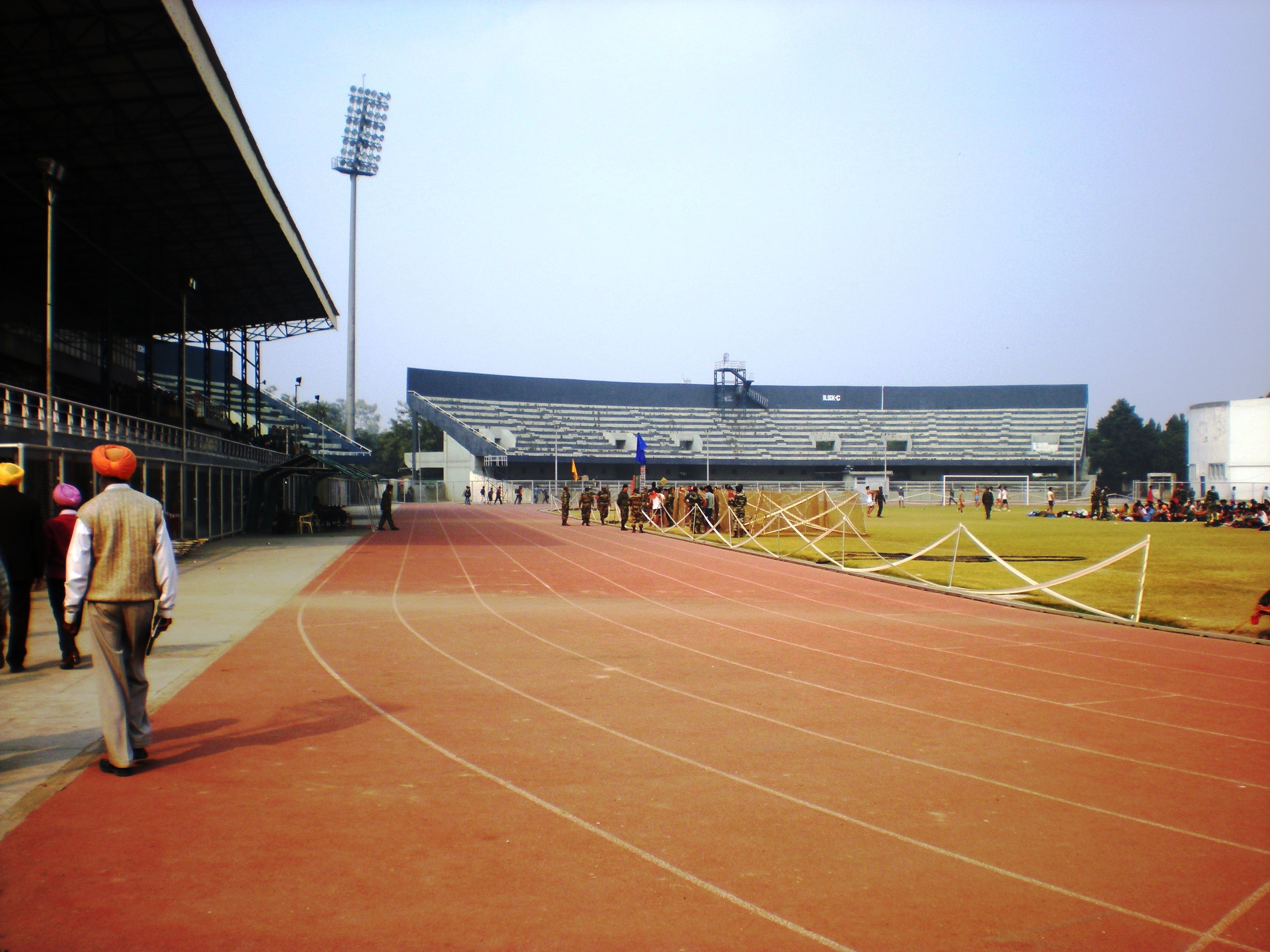
Guru Nanak Stadium in Ludhiana, former home ground of the club.

The official home ground of Minerva Academy was Tau Devi Lal Stadium of Panchkula, used in the I-League, with a seating capacity of 12,000. The club previously used the Guru Nanak Stadium, but only for one season.

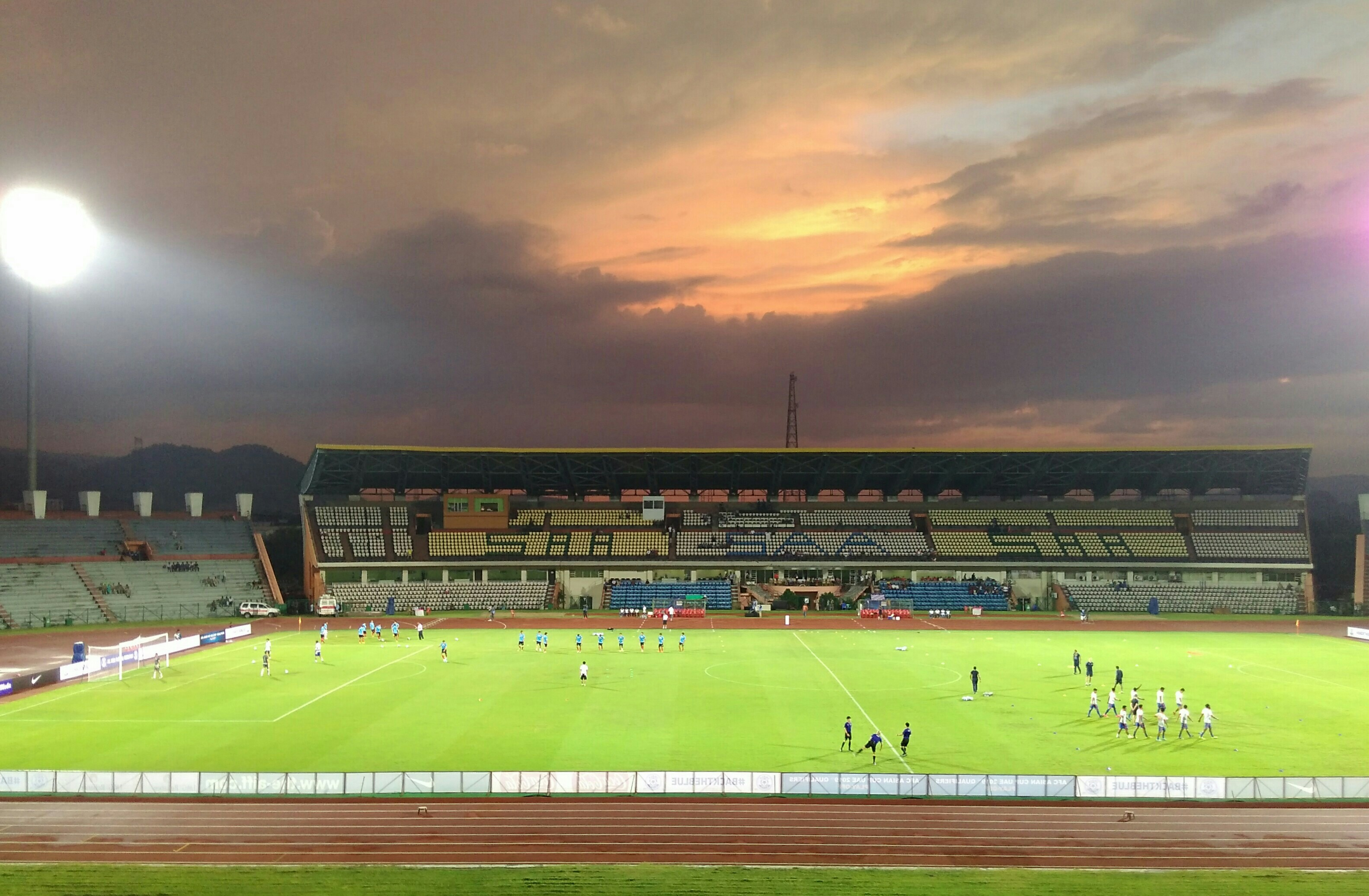
Indira Gandhi Athletic Stadium in Guwahati, served as home ground of Minerva Punjab for their AFC Cup matches.

During I-League Second Division, the club used Minerva Academy Ground in Chandigarh as home venue. When the club entered into continental tourney AFC Cup, they used various stadiums which could fit the competitions standards. During the group stage, club played two matches at the Indira Gandhi Athletic Stadium in Guwahati, and remaining at the Kalinga Stadium in Bhubaneswar. They previously used Sector 17 Training Ground in Chandigarh for training purposes.

The club is currently using Minerva Academy Ground, which is located in Chandigarh.

== Kit manufacturers and shirt sponsors ==
Period	Kit manufacturer	Shirt sponsor
2015–2017	T10 Sports	—
2017–2019	Astro	Apollo Tyres
2019–2020	Spartan	Apollo Tyres
2020–present	Spartan	—

== Records and statistics ==
=== Overall records ===
As of 12 March 2023

Season	Division							Continental						Top scorer	
Season	Division	P	W	D	L	GF	GA	P	W	D	L	GF	GA	Player	Goals
As Minerva Punjab
2015–16	I-League 2nd Division	18	11	4	3	30	14	Not qualified						(Nigeria) Kareem Nurain	4
2016–17	I-League	18	2	7	9	17	33	Not qualified						(Nigeria) Kareem Nurain (Nigeria) Loveday Enyinnaya	3
2017–18	I-League	18	11	2	5	24	16	Not qualified						(Bhutan) Chencho Gyeltshen	7
2018–19	I-League	20	4	6	10	10	19	7	0	5	2	6	11	(Nigeria) Philip Njoku (Ghana) William Opoku (Ivory Coast) Lancine Touré	2
As Punjab	I-League														
2019–20	I-League	16	5	8	3	23	11	Not qualified						(Cameroon) Aser Pierrick Dipanda	12

=== Continental records ===
As of 27 June 2019

Competition	Pld	W	D	L	GF	GA	GD
AFC Champions League	1	0	0	1	0	4	−4
AFC Cup	6	0	5	1	6	7	−1
Total	7	0	5	2	6	11	–5

=== Other records ===
- Top goalscorer in I-League, representing Minerva Punjab: (Cameroon) Aser Pierrick Dipanda (with 12 goals).
- Youngest goalscorer in AFC Cup: (India) Thoiba Singh Moirangthem (at 16 years and 154 days), representing Minerva Punjab: 1–1 tie vs Manang Marshyangdi; 15 May 2019.
- Maximum number of points earned in the country's highest division: 35 (in 2017–18 I-League).
- Highest scoring in domestic league: 5–4 (away win vs. Churchill Brothers at the Tilak Maidan in Goa; 19 February 2017).
- Biggest margin win/most goals scored by a team in the AIFF Sub Junior League: 33–1 win against Namdhari Academy (31 March 2024).
- Youngest goalscorer in I-League: (India) Baoringdao Bodo (at 17 years 3 months and 18 days), representing Minerva Punjab: 2–1 win vs Mumbai FC; 4 February 2017.

== Performance in AFC competitions ==
Season	Competition	Round	Club	Home	Away	Position	Top scorer
2019	AFC Champions League	Preliminary round 2	(Iran) Saipa	0–4		Preliminary Round	(India) Sreyas Valiyaveettu Gopalan (2 goals)
2019	AFC Cup	Group E	(India) Chennaiyin	0–0	1–1	Third in Group E	(India) Sreyas Valiyaveettu Gopalan (2 goals)
2019	AFC Cup	Group E	(Bangladesh) Dhaka Abahani	2–2	0–1	Third in Group E	(India) Sreyas Valiyaveettu Gopalan (2 goals)
2019	AFC Cup	Group E	(Nepal) Manang Marshyangdi	2–2	1–1	Third in Group E	(India) Sreyas Valiyaveettu Gopalan (2 goals)

== Managerial record ==
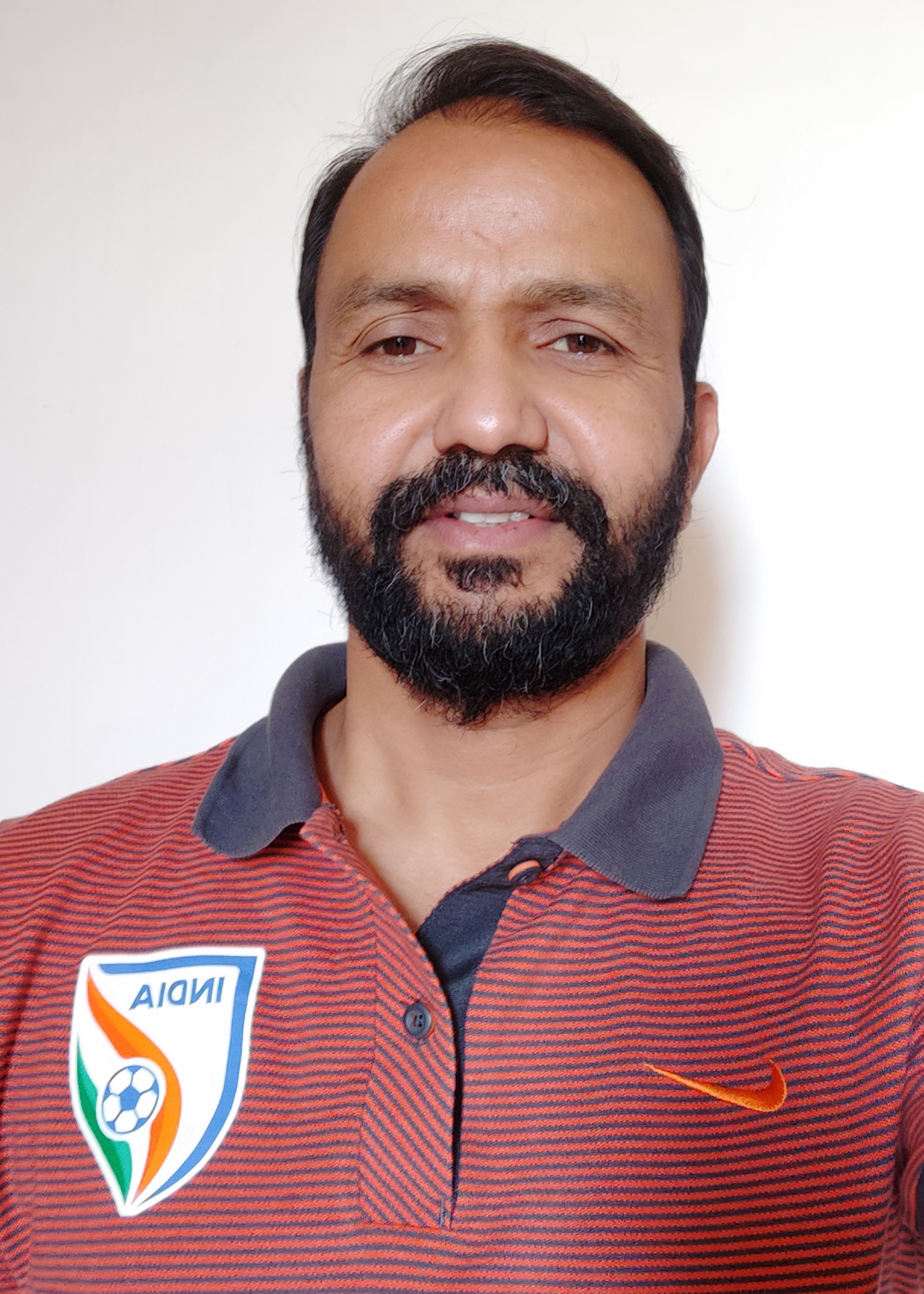
Surinder Singh managed the club in the I-League Second Division during their first season.

Name	Nationality	From	To	P	W	D	L	GF	GA	Win%	Ref.
Surinder Singh	India	1 July 2015	5 January 2017	28	7	10	11	31	44	25.00	
José Carlos Hevia	Spain	5 January 2017	1 June 2017	0	0	0	0	0	0	—	
Juan Luis Pérez Herrera	Spain	1 June 2017	1 September 2017	—	−	−	−	−	−	—	
Khogen Singh	India	1 September 2017	31 May 2018	18	11	2	5	24	16	61.11	
Sachin Badadhe	India	31 May 2018	7 August 2018	—	−	−	−	−	−	—	
Paul Munster	Northern Ireland	8 August 2018	12 February 2019	16	3	5	8	8	15	18.75	
Sachin Badadhe	India	12 February 2019	30 June 2019	3	1	0	2	2	4	33.33	
Yan Law	India	1 July 2019	31 May 2020	16	5	8	3	23	21	31.25	
Emerson Ricardo Alcântara	Brazil	2020	2021	—	−	−	−	−	−	—	
Tushar Soodan	India	2021	2023	—	−	−	−	−	−	—	

== Minerva youth ==
=== Youth and academy ===
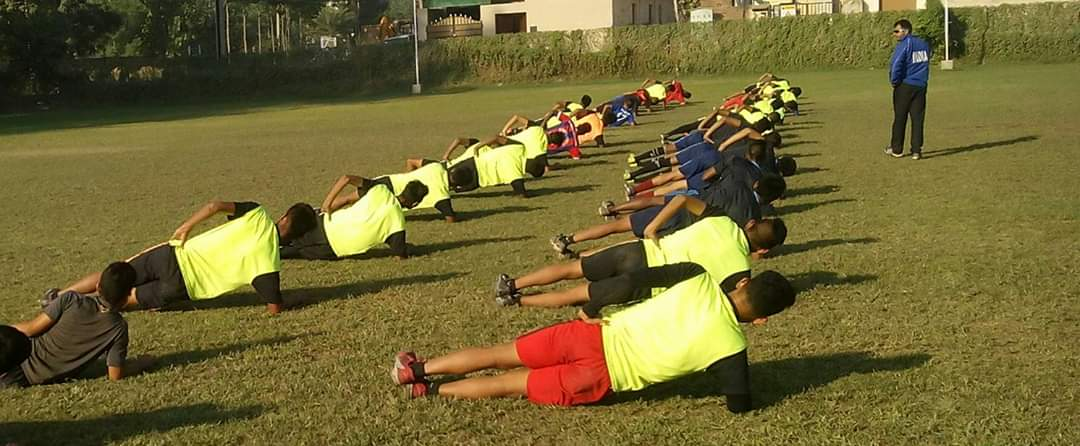
Youth players of Minerva in training, in 2020.

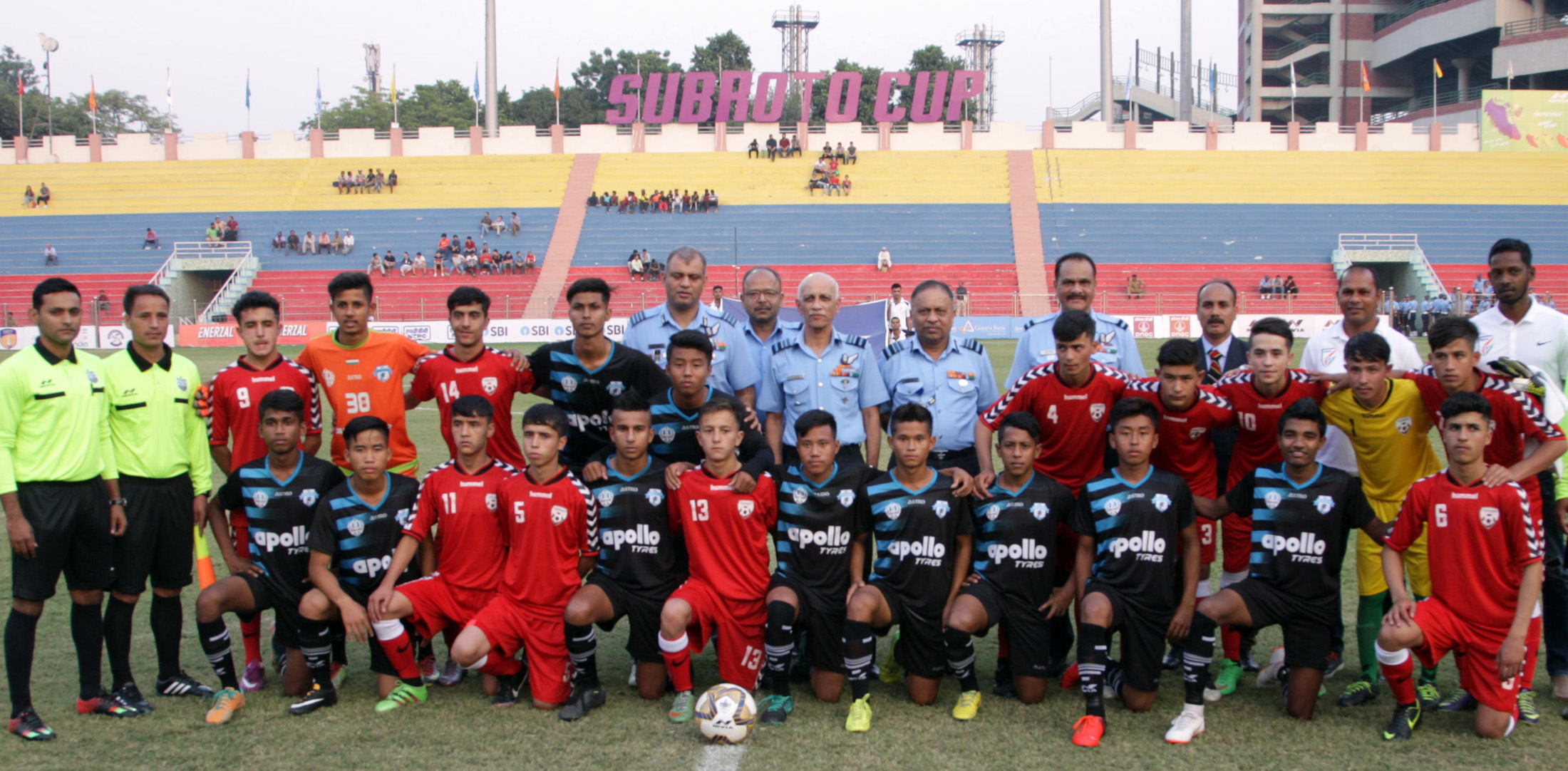
Minerva players (in black) at the 59th edition of Subroto Cup, at the Dr. B.R. Ambedkar Stadium in New Delhi, October 2018.

Since the foundation in 2005, Minerva focused on youth development, and has more than hundred residential academies in the country. Club's youth men's section has been participating in various age-group domestic competitions, including U13, U15, and U18 Hero Youth Leagues, in which they clinched multiple titles. Club's academy is responsible in nurturing talents, bringing up promising youngsters; Many of them graduated from the club's academy and went on to represent India internationally. In 2017–18, Spanish manager José Carlos Hevia served as head of Minerva's academy and reserve team. Ahead of the 2017 FIFA U-17 World Cup, club's reserve team appeared in an exhibition match against one of the participants Columbia U17. In June 2020, Minerva Academy was recommended for "Rashtriya Khel Protsahan Puraskar" for producing more than 70 players for the various India national football sides.

In 2022, U12 team of Minerva Academy took part in Mina Cup, an youth international tournament held in Dubai, United Arab Emirates. In that tournament, they won title with dominant performance, beating Barcelona Academy 4–0 in final. Later in July 2023, they went to Sweden, and took part in U13 category of the prestigious Gothia Cup. On 22 July, defeating Brazilian side Ordin by 3–1 in final at the SKF Arena, Minerva Academy became the first ever Indian team to clinch Gothia Cup title. In that edition, more than 150 teams competed; Minerva went on to seal the championship winning all their matches, scoring 46 goals, and conceding only 2. Club's academy gained an 'elite category' accreditation by the All India Football Federation in December 2023. The club won Sub Junior League title in 2024, defeating Bengaluru FC 7–4 in final. In October 2024, Minerva Academy's player Mohammad Razin made headlines by signing the Saudi U-15 Premier League side Al-Nassr FC U14 through passing the trials. In May 2025, the club clinched AIFF Sub-Junior League, defeating hosts FC Madras 2–1 in the final day. In July 2025, the U-14 team of the club took part in Helsinki Cup in Finland. In that tournament, Minerva Academy ended their campaign with a runners-up finish, scoring 42 goals in 10 matches, conceding just 1 goal, that too only in final against Finnish club PK-35. The club clinched Dana Cup title in Denmark in July 2025, defeating Maltese side KFF Club by 15–0 in the final; By the end of the tournament, Minerva Academy scored 110 goals in seven matches, conceding only one goal. In August 2025, the club clinched Norway Cup title in U14 boys category, scoring a staggering 130 goals across eight matches which made them the highest-scoring team in the tournament across all age groups.

The 2026 Helsinki Cup was lifted by Minerva Academy FC's B12 team on 11 July after defeating two-time champions, HJK, in the final.

==== Notable Minerva youth graduates/players ====
- Jeakson Singh Thounaojam
- Dheeraj Singh Moirangthem
- Givson Singh
- Amarjit Singh Kiyam
- Vikram Pratap Singh
- Dilliram Sanyasi
- Baoringdao Bodo
- Kamalpreet Singh
- Arshdeep Singh
- Aakash Sangwan
- Krishna Pandit

== Other departments ==
=== Cricket ===
Minerva has been running academies and teams for cricket since inception. It is widely known for producing international cricketers including Gurkeerat Singh Mann, Mandeep Singh, Rishi Dhawan, Barinder Sran, Manan Vohra, Siddarth Kaul, and Shubman Gill. The cricket section is accredited to Punjab Cricket Association (PCA). Minerva clinched JP Atray Cricket Tournament title in Mohali, in September 2005, in their debut season.

=== Futsal ===
The futsal section was included within Minerva Academy in later years, and the team participated in the inaugural Futsal Club Championship organised by the All India Football Federation (AIFF). The club emerged as champion in the 2022–23 edition, and qualified for the AFC Futsal Club Championship. The club also clinched the Punjab Futsal Club Championship title in 2023 and 2024.

== Honours ==
=== Association football ===
==== Senior team ====
League

- I-League (Note: From 2017–18 season until 2021–22 season, I-League and Indian Super League shared joint top flight status in Indian Football.)
  - Champions (1): 2017–18
  - Third place (1): 2019–20
- I-League 2nd Division
  - Runners-up (1): 2015–16
- Punjab State Super League
  - Champions (2): 2017–18, 2019–20
  - Runners-up (1): 2018–19
- Punjab State Second Division League
  - Champions (1): 2020–21
- Punjab State Third Division League
  - Champions (1): 2020–21

Cup

- J&K Invitational Cup
  - Champions (1): 2018 (Note: Title shared with Real Kashmir.)
- Harbhajan Singh Memorial All-India Football Tournament
  - Champions (1): 2018
- Sukhia Gold Cup
  - Champions (1): 2019
- Bodousa Cup
  - Runners-up (1): 2019

==== Youth team ====
National

- Youth League U18
  - Champions (1): 2018–19
- Youth League U15 (Note: Youth League U15 was formerly known as "Nike Premier Cup".)
  - Champions (4): 2015–16, 2016–17, 2017–18, 2018–19
- Youth League U13
  - Champions (3): 2017–18, 2023–24, 2024–25
- Punjab State Youth League
  - Champions (1): 2021–22
- Subroto Cup (sub-junior)
  - Champions (1): 2023, 2025
- RFYS National Championship
  - Champions (1): 2018
- Chandigarh U17 Youth Championship
  - Champions (1): 2015
- All India Balachur Open Cup
  - Champions (1): 2018
- Principal Harbhajan Singh Memorial Tournament (U17)
  - Champions (1): 2022
- Administrator's U17 Challenge Cup
  - Champions (1): 2018
- Namdhari Under-17 Football League
  - Champions (1): 2021
- CISCE Pre-Subroto Cup (U14)
  - Champions (2): 2023 (North-India zone), 2023 (all-India)

International

- (United Arab Emirates) Mina Cup
  - Champions (1): 2022 (U12)
- (Sweden) Gothia Cup
  - Champions (3):
    - 2023 (U13),
    - 2025 (U14),
    - 2026 (U12)
- (Denmark) Dana Cup
  - Champions (1): 2025 (U14)
- Norway Cup
  - Champions (1): 2025 (U14)
- (Finland) Helsinki Cup
  - Champions (1): 2026 (U12)
  - Runners-up (1): 2025 (U14)
- (Spain) Mediterranean International Cup
  - Quarterfinalists (1): 2026 (U15)

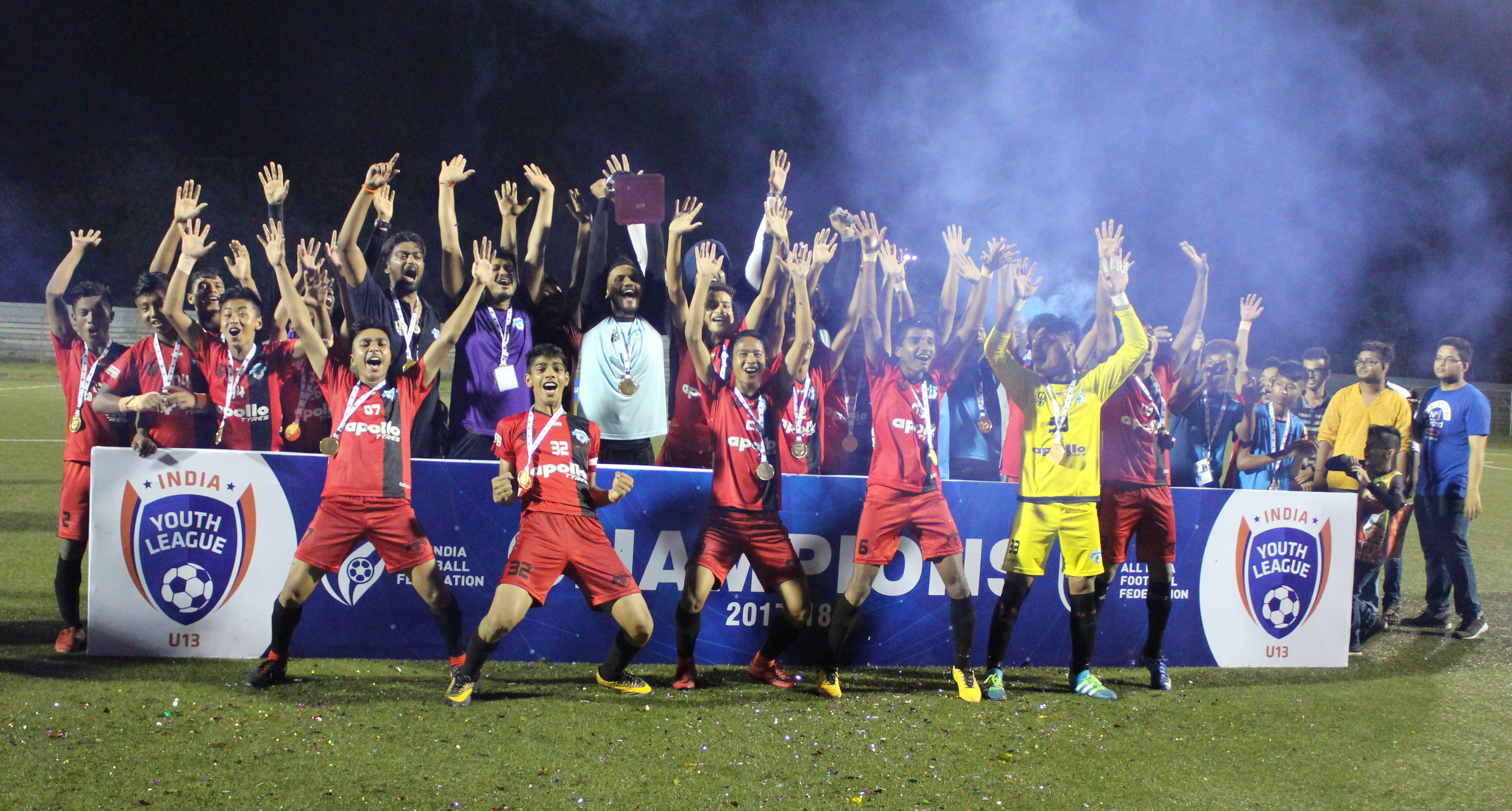
Club's U13 players in celebration after clinching the 2017–18 Youth I-League.

=== Futsal ===
- Hero Futsal Club Championship
  - Champions (1): 2022–23
- Punjab Futsal Club Championship
  - Champions (2): 2023, 2024

=== Cricket ===
- JP Atray Cricket Trophy
  - Champions (2): 2005, 2025
  - Runners-up (1): 2019
- Chandigarh One-day Open Cricket Tournament
  - Champions (1): 2005
- Amey Tripathi Cricket Championship
  - Champions (1): 2016
- Uttrakhand Gold Cup
  - Champions (1): 2016

== Notable players ==
=== Past and present internationals ===
The following Minerva Academy/Minerva Punjab players have been capped at full international level. Years in brackets indicate their spells at the club.

India

- (India) Manvir Singh (2015–2016)
- (India) Sukhwinder Singh (2015–2016)
- (India) Jagpreet Singh (2016)
- (India) Clifford Miranda (2016)
- (India) Germanpreet Singh (2016–2017)
- (India) Anirudh Thapa (2017)
- (India) Jewel Raja (2017)
- (India) Gurjinder Kumar (2017)
- (India) Davinder Singh (2017)
- (India) Vinit Rai (2017)
- (India) Aakash Sangwan (2017–2019)
- (India) Manandeep Singh (2017; 2018–2019)
- (India) Jeakson Singh (2017–2018)
- (India) Anwar Ali Jr. (2017–2018)
- (India) Hormipam Ruivah (2018–2020)
- (India) Anwar Ali (2019–2020)

Asia (AFC)

- (Guam) Marcus Lopez (2016)
- (Kyrgyzstan) Ivan Filatov (2017)
- (Bhutan) Chencho Gyeltshen (2017–2018)
- (Nepal) Kiran Chemjong (2018; 2019–2020)
- (Syria) Mahmoud Amnah (2019)
- (Maldives) Ali Ashfaq (2019)

Africa (CAF)

- (Rwanda) Aimable Nsabimana (2018)
- (Senegal) Papa Niang (2018)
- (Liberia) Teah Dennis Jr. (2019–2020)

North America (CONCACAF)

- (Trinidad and Tobago) Robert Primus (2019)
- (Saint Vincent and the Grenadines) Cornelius Stewart (2019)

=== Other foreign players ===
All the players below, appeared in I-League, representing the club.

- (Belarus) Dzmitry Kowb (2017)
- (Senegal) Kassim Aidara (2017–2018)
- (Ghana) William Opoku (2017–2019)
- (Japan) Yu Kuboki (2018)
- (Nigeria) Philip Njoku (2018–2019)
- (Ivory Coast) Lancine Touré (2018–2019)
- (Colombia) Jorge Caceido (2018–2019)
- (The Gambia) Dawda Ceesay (2019)
- (Ukraine) Roland Bilala (2019)
- (Spain) Juan Quero (2019)
- (Ghana) Kalif Alhassan (2019)
- (Brazil) Sérgio Barboza Júnior (2019–2020)
- (Cameroon) Aser Pierrick Dipanda (2019–2020)
- (England) Jay Hart (2019–2020)
- (Brazil) Danilo Quipapá (2019–2021)

== Affiliations & partnerships ==
The following clubs/academies are/were affiliated with Minerva Academy FC:

Club

- (India) Techtro Swades United (2020–)
- (India) Delhi FC (2020–)
- (India) Techtro Lucknow (2020–)
- (Germany) Borussia Mönchengladbach (2019–2020)

Academy

- (India) Chandigarh Football Academy (2015–)
- (India) Kick Football Academy (2019–)
- (India) Poirei Lamdam Football Academy (2022–)

== See also ==
- List of football clubs in Punjab
- Indian football clubs in Asian competitions
- Sports in the Indian state of Punjab
- Delhi Premier League
