= 2018–19 Bengaluru FC season =

6th season in existence of Bengaluru FC

Bengaluru FC
2018–19 season
- Bengaluru FC vs Chennaiyin, season's opening match dated 30 September 2018.
- Chairman: Parth Jindal
- Manager: Carles Cuadrat
- Stadium: Sree Kanteerava Stadium
- Indian Super League: Winners
- AFC Cup: Inter-zonal play-off semi-finals (Note: Bengaluru FC advanced to the inter-zone play-off semi-finals during 2017–18 season.)
- Super Cup: Quarter-finals
- Top goalscorer: League: Sunil Chhetri (9 goals); All: Sunil Chhetri (10 goals)
| Home colours | Away colours | Third colours |
- All statistics correct as of 4 April 2019.

The 2018–19 season was Bengaluru FC's sixth season as club since its establishment in 2013.

== Background ==
=== Transfers ===
At the fag end of 2017–18 Indian Super League season Bengaluru FC extended contract of defender Rahul Bheke till May 2021. He joined captain Sunil Chhetri and winger Udanta Singh, both has contract till the end of 2019–20 season. Defender Juanan extended his stay with Bengaluru FC for two more seasons. First choice goalkeeper Gurpreet Singh Sandhu extended his contract for five more seasons, which will keep him till 2023 with Bengaluru FC. Bengaluru FC's Australian midfielder Erik Paartalu also extended his stay with the club for two more seasons. Defender Nishu Kumar and striker Thongkhosiem Haokip extended their stay in the club for two more seasons.

Midfielder Lenny Rodrigues transferred to FC Goa. Midfielder Boithang Haokip extended his stay with Bengaluru FC till the end of 2020 season. Bengaluru FC also extended contract of Spanish midfielder Dimas Delgado for one more season. Defender Harmanjot Khabra extended his stay with Bengaluru FC for three more season. English defender John Johnson ended his five years journey with the club at the end of the season to join ATK. Striker Daniel Lalhlimpuia left the Bengaluru FC after three-year stint with the club. Goalkeeper Lalthuammawia Ralte parted ways with the club as well. Bengaluru FC also released Spanish trio of Toni, Víctor Pérez Alonso, and Daniel Lucas Segovia at the end of the season. Left-back Subhasish Bose transferred to Mumbai City FC. Bengaluru FC also released more inexperienced players at the end of season including Calvin Abhishek, Abhra Mondal, Joyner Lourenco, Zohmingliana Ralte, and Collin Abranches. Midfielder Malsawmzuala left the Bengaluru FC after three-year stint with the club. Midfielder Alwyn George transferred to FC Pune City.

On 3 June 2018, Bengaluru announced signing of Indian winger Kean Lewis for one season. Bengaluru FC also re-signed right-back Rino Anto. On 11 June Bengaluru FC announced signing of defenders Gursimrat Singh Gill and Sairuat Kima for two seasons. On 25 June Bengaluru FC announced signing of Bhutanese forward Chencho Gyeltshen on a one-year deal. On 6 July Bengaluru FC announced signing of Spanish winger Xisco Hernández on a one-year deal. On 9 July, Bengaluru FC announced return of goalkeeper Soram Poirei after three years. He signed a one-year deal. After the early end to their AFC Cup campaign, Bengaluru FC signed Spanish center-back Albert Serrán on a one-year deal.

At the end of winter transfer window, Bengaluru loaned out Bhutanese striker Chencho Gyeltshen on a loan deal to I-League club NEROCA F.C. and was replaced by Spanish Attacking midfielder Luisma. After qualifying for 2018–19 Indian Super League playoffs, Bengaluru signed Spanish midfielder Álex Barrera on a short-term deal, owing to the injury of Erik Paartalu.

==== In ====
| No. | Position | Player | Previous club | Transfer fee | Date | Ref |
|---|---|---|---|---|---|---|
| 8 | MF | (India) Kean Lewis | Pune City | Free agent | 3 June 2018 | |
| 13 | DF | (India) Rino Anto | Kerala Blasters | Free agent | 6 June 2018 | |
| 33 | DF | (India) Gursimrat Singh Gill | Northeast United | Free agent | 11 June 2018 | |
| 4 | DF | (India) Sairuat Kima | Jamshedpur | Free agent | 11 June 2018 | |
| 27 | FW | (Bhutan) Chencho Gyeltshen | Minerva Punjab | Free agent | 25 June 2018 | |
| 19 | MF | (Spain) Xisco Hernández | (Spain) Atlético Baleares | Free agent | 6 July 2018 | |
| 23 | GK | (India) Soram Poirei | ATK | Free agent | 9 July 2018 | |
| 3 | DF | (Spain) Albert Serrán | (Morocco) Chabab Rif | Free agent | 31 August 2018 | |
| 9 | MF | (Spain) Luisma | (Spain) Ponferradina | Free agent | 31 January 2019 | |
| 24 | MF | (Spain) Álex Barrera | (Spain) Extremadura | Free agent | 2 March 2019 | |

==== Out ====
| No. | Position | Player | Outgoing club | Date | Fee | Ref |
|---|---|---|---|---|---|---|
| 3 | DF | (India) Collin Abranches | Unattached | 31 May 2018 | Free agent | |
| 4 | DF | (India) Zohmingliana Ralte | Chennaiyin | 31 May 2018 | Free agent | |
| 6 | DF | (England) John Johnson | ATK | 31 May 2018 | Free agent | |
| 8 | MF | (India) Lenny Rodrigues | Goa | 31 May 2018 | Free agent | |
| 12 | MF | (Spain) Daniel Segovia | (Spain) Racing de Santander | 31 May 2018 | Free agent | |
| 15 | DF | (India) Subhasish Bose | Mumbai City | 31 May 2018 | Free agent | |
| 19 | MF | (Spain) Toni | (Cyprus) Nea Salamis Famagusta | 31 May 2018 | Free agent | |
| 20 | MF | (India) Alwyn George | Pune City | 31 May 2018 | Free agent | |
| 23 | GK | (India) Abhra Mondal | (India) East Bengal | 31 May 2018 | Free agent | |
| 24 | DF | (India) Joyner Lourenco | Mumbai City | 31 May 2018 | Free agent | |
| 25 | FW | (India) Daniel Lalhlimpuia | Delhi Dynamos | 31 May 2018 | Free agent | |
| 28 | GK | (India) Lalthuammawia Ralte | Goa | 31 May 2018 | Free agent | |
| 30 | MF | (India) Malsawmzuala | ATK | 31 May 2018 | Free agent | |
| 32 | GK | (India) Calvin Abhishek | (India) ARA | 31 May 2018 | Free agent | |
| 44 | MF | (Spain) Victor Perez Alonso | (Lithuania) FK Žalgiris | 31 May 2018 | Free agent | |

==== Out on loan ====
| No. | Position | Player | Outgoing club | Date | Fee | Ref |
|---|---|---|---|---|---|---|
| 27 | FW | (Bhutan) Chencho Gyeltshen | (India) NEROCA | 31 January 2019 | Unknown | |

== Pre-season and friendlies ==
Bengaluru FC started their pre-season on 14 July 2018 at the Bangalore Football Stadium, with a trip to Bellary in the first leg and Spain in the second leg before facing Altyn Asyr of Turkmenistan in AFC Cup Inter-zone play-off semi-finals on 22 August at the Sree Kanteerava Stadium. In the first friendly, Bengaluru played Atlético Saguntino and suffered a close defeat 2–1, with Dimas Delgado scoring the only goal. Playing against UAE Pro-League team Shabab Al-Ahli, Bengaluru suffered another defeat 5–1. Bengaluru's pre-season tour ended winless as they suffered 1–0 and 3–0 defeat to Villarreal B and Barcelona B, respectively.

After the exit in AFC Cup, Bengaluru FC played a friendly against MEG and won 7–0 with Sunil Chhetri and Miku scoring braces. Bengaluru FC played friendlies with I-League side, Chennai City F.C. winning the first 5–0 and losing the second 1–2. Bengaluru FC next played friendly with I-League side, Gokulam Kerala F.C. and won the match 4–1.

| 3 August 2018 Friendly | (Spain) Atlético Saguntino | 2–1 | Bengaluru (India) | Valencia |
| 19:00 UTC+2 | Fas 7'; 84' | Report | Dimas 53' | Stadium: Masía La Grava |

| 6 August 2018 Friendly | (United Arab Emirates) Shabab Al-Ahli | 5–1 | Bengaluru (India) | Alicante |
| 19:00 UTC+2 | 16'; 46'; 51'; 64'; 79' | Report | Udanta 42' | Stadium: Meliá Villaitana Football Center |

| 11 August 2018 Friendly | (Spain) Villarreal B | 1–0 | Bengaluru (India) | Villarreal |
| 19:00 UTC+2 | Xavier Quintillà 32' (pen.) | Report | | Stadium: Mini Estadi |

| 14 August 2018 Friendly | (Spain) Barcelona B | 3–0 | Bengaluru (India) | Barcelona |
| 20:00 UTC+2 | Monchu 55'; Pérez 62', 72' | Report | | Stadium: Mini Estadi |

| 8 September 2018 Friendly | (India) Bengaluru | 7–0 | MEG (India) | Bengaluru |
| 11:00 UTC+5:30 | Chhetri; Miku; Udanta; Lewis; Lalengzama | Report | | Stadium: Bangalore Football Stadium |

| 14 September 2018 Friendly | (India) Bengaluru | 5–0 | Chennai City (India) | Bengaluru |
| 11:00 UTC+5:30 | Altamash; T. Haokip; Chencho; Edmund Lalrindika | Report | | Stadium: Bangalore Football Stadium |

| 15 September 2018 Friendly | (India) Bengaluru | 1–2 | Chennai City (India) | Bengaluru |
| 11:00 UTC+5:30 | Bheke | Report | Sandro Rodríguez; Pedro Manzi | Stadium: Sree Kanteerava Stadium |

| 23 September 2018 Friendly | (India) Bengaluru | 4–1 | Gokulam Kerala (India) | Bengaluru |
| 11:00 UTC+5:30 | Miku; Chhetri | Report | Goal | Stadium: Sree Kanteerava Stadium |

== Competitions ==
=== Overview ===
| Competition | First match | Last match | Starting round | Final position | Record | | | | | | | |
| Competition | First match | Last match | Starting round | Final position | Pld | W | D | L | GF | GA | GD | Win % |
|---|---|---|---|---|---|---|---|---|---|---|---|---|
| 2018 AFC Cup | 22 August 2018 | 29 August 2018 | Quarter-final | Quarter-final | 2 | 0 | 0 | 2 | 2 | 5 | −3 | 0.00 |
| 2018–19 Indian Super League | 30 September 2018 | 17 March 2019 | Matchday-1 | Champions | 21 | 12 | 4 | 5 | 34 | 24 | +10 | 57.14 |
| Super Cup | 4 April 2018 | 4 April 2018 | Quarter-final | Quarter-final | 1 | 0 | 0 | 1 | 1 | 2 | −1 | 0.00 |
| Total | | | | | 24 | 12 | 4 | 8 | 37 | 31 | +6 | 50.00 |

Last updated: 31 May 2019
Source: Competitions

=== Indian Super League ===
==== Summary ====
===== September–October =====
Bengaluru kicked off their campaign against defending champions Chennaiyin on 30 September 2018. Bengaluru FC started the game in a 4–2–3–1 with new signings Albert Serrán and Xisco Hernández making their ISL debut for the club. Miku broke the deadlock in the 41st minute to earn the lead for the home team. Bengaluru continued to attack in the second half, but none of the team could score the goal and Bengaluru registered the first win of the 2018–19 season. Playing against Jamshedpur FC on 7 October, Nishu Kumar got the lead for Bengaluru at the stroke of half time with a long-range effort. Bengaluru paid for the missed chances as the substitute Gourav Mukhi scored an equalizer in the 81st minute. Bengaluru restored the lead in 87th minute when Sunil Chhetri scored goal from Harmanjot Khabra's lobbed pass. However, Bengaluru failed to secure all 3 points when Sergio Cidoncha scored the equalizer in the last minute and the game ended 2–2. After returning from the international break, Bengaluru played the first away game of the season against FC Pune City on 22 October. Sunil Chhetri scored twice in the first half and Miku scored another goal to wrap up a dominant 3–0 win. Playing the next away game against ATK, Bengaluru were trailing the home team when Komal Thatal scored in 15th minute. Bengaluru equalized just before the half-time when Miku converted the free-kick at the edge of the penalty box. In the second half, Erik Paartalu scored the second goal that proved decisive and Bengaluru won the game.

===== November–December =====
Before heading to the international break, Bengaluru FC played southern rivals, Kerala Blasters on 5 November. Sunil Chhetri scored the goal in 17th minute from Miku's pass, but Kerala Blasters equalized in 30th minute when Nishu Kumar was adjudged to have fouled Sahal Samad inside the penalty box and Stojanovič converted the penalty. Both teams continued the quest to find the winner in the second half. Bengaluru FC took the lead in 80th minute when Naveen Kumar could not prevent Nikola Krčmarević's own goal and Bengaluru returned to the top of the table with 2–1 victory. Bengaluru faced FC Goa on 22 November. Miku and Erik Paartalu were ruled out because of injuries and Chencho Gyeltshen made his first start for Bengaluru. The visitors took the lead in the 34th minute as Rahul Bheke's backheel flick off Xisco Hernandez' week shot at goal found the net. Both sides were reduced to 10-men when Mohamed Ali and Dimas Delgado were sent off in the second half. Goa equalized when Coro's square pass found Brandon Fernandes in front of the goal and the forward's shot took a deflection on its way into the net. Just as Goa felt they were back in the match, Sunil Chhetri restored the visitors' lead in the 77th minute from Udanta Singh's cross. Playing against Delhi Dynamos FC on 26 November, Bengaluru played without Miku and Dimas Delgado and Erik Paartalu was not named in the starting lineup after recovering from toe injury. With key players missing, Bengaluru failed to stop Delhi from creating chances and were wasteful in the chances of their own. However, Delhi remained goalless as they could not finish chances they created. The deadlock was broken in the dying minutes when Udanta jumped onto a loose ball and launched a low shot from outside the box. The ball took a deflection before hitting the frame of the goal and crossing the line and Bengaluru regained the top position on the table with 1–0 win.

===== March =====

Lineup against FC Goa in 2019 Indian Super League Final

==== League stage ====
| 30 September 2018 1 | Bengaluru | 1–0 | Chennaiyin | Bengaluru |
| 19:30 IST | Khabra (yellow card) 35'; Miku 41' | Report | Jerry (yellow card) 57' | Stadium: Sree Kanteerava Stadium; Attendance: 20,786; Referee: Santosh Kumar; Man of the Match: Miku (Bengaluru FC) |

| 7 October 2018 2 | Bengaluru | 2–2 | Jamshedpur | Bengaluru |
| 19:30 IST | Nishu 45'; Paartalu (yellow card) 45'; Chhetri 88' | Report | Yumnam (yellow card) 40'; Memo (yellow card) 68'; Jerry (yellow card) 70'; Mukhi 81'; Mobashir Rahman (yellow card) 89'; Cidoncha 90+4' | Stadium: Sree Kanteerava Stadium; Attendance: 15,893; Referee: C. R. Srikrishna; Man of the Match: Nishu Kumar (Bengaluru FC) |

| 22 October 2018 3 | Pune City | 0–3 | Bengaluru | Pune |
| 19:30 IST | Kuruniyan (yellow card) 10'; Panwar (yellow card) 59' | Report | Chhetri 41', 43'; Khabra (yellow card) 47'; Miku 64' | Stadium: Shree Shiv Chhatrapati Sports Complex; Attendance: 8,193; Referee: Pranjal Banerjee; Man of the Match: Sunil Chhetri (Bengaluru FC) |

| 31 October 2018 4 | ATK | 1–2 | Bengaluru | Kolkata |
| 19:30 IST | B. Singh (yellow card) 13'; Thatal 15'; Arindam (yellow card) 33'; Halder (yellow card) 84' | Report | Miku 45+3'; Paartalu 47' (yellow card) 49'; Nishu (yellow card) 58'; Juanan (yellow card) 90' | Stadium: Salt Lake Stadium; Attendance: 17,656; Referee: R Venkatesh; Man of the Match: Erik Paartalu (Bengaluru FC) |

| 5 November 2018 5 | Kerala Blasters | 1–2 | Bengaluru | Kochi |
| 19:30 IST | Stojanovič 30' (pen.); Lalruatthara (yellow card) 49'; Vineeth (yellow card) 79' | Report | Chhetri 71'; Serran (yellow card) 79'; Krčmarević 81' (o.g.) | Stadium: Jawaharlal Nehru Stadium; Attendance: 28,916; Referee: R Venkatesh; Man of the Match: Dimas Delgado (Bengaluru FC) |

| 22 November 2018 6 | Goa | 1–2 | Bengaluru | Margao |
| 19:30 IST | Ali (yellow card) 36' (yellow-red card) 47'; Boumous (yellow card) 54'; Fernandes 72' | Report | Bheke 34'; Dimas (red card) 59'; Chhetri 77' | Stadium: Fatorda Stadium; Attendance: 17,807; Referee: Muhammad Taqi Aljaafari Bin Jahari; Man of the Match: Sunil Chhetri (Bengaluru) |

| 26 November 2018 7 | Bengaluru | 1–0 | Delhi Dynamos | Bengaluru |
| 19:30 IST | Khabra (yellow card) 44'; Udanta 87' | Report | Carmona (yellow card) 26'; Crespí (yellow card) 89' | Stadium: Sree Kanteerava Stadium; Attendance: 10,983; Referee: Santosh Kumar; Man of the Match: Nishu Kumar (Bengaluru FC) |

| 30 November 2018 8 | Bengaluru | 2–1 | Pune City | Bengaluru |
| 19:30 IST | Udanta 11'; Bheke 88' | Report | Bheke 15' (o.g.); Marcelinho (yellow card) 90' | Stadium: Sree Kanteerava Stadium; Attendance: 11,907; Referee: L Ajithkumar Meitei; Man of the Match: Rahul Bheke (Bengaluru FC) |

| 5 December 2018 9 | NorthEast United | 1–1 | Bengaluru | Guwahati |
| 19:30 IST | Gallego 64'; Ogbeche (yellow card) 71' | Report | Gurpreet (yellow card) 66'; Chencho 90+2' | Stadium: Indira Gandhi Athletic Stadium; Attendance: 12,371; Referee: C. R. Srikrishna; Man of the Match: Chencho Gyeltshen (Bengaluru FC) |

| 9 December 2018 10 | Bengaluru | 1–1 | Mumbai City | Bengaluru |
| 19:30 IST | Udanta 23'; Khabra (yellow card) 59'; Bheke (yellow card) 61' | Report | Sehnaj (yellow card) 10' (yellow-red card) 51'; Sougou 31' (yellow card) 85'; Bastos (yellow card) 87' | Stadium: Sree Kanteerava Stadium; Attendance: 13,892; Referee: R Venkatesh; Man of the Match: Arnold Issoko (Mumbai City FC) |

| 13 December 2018 11 | Bengaluru | 1–0 | ATK | Bengaluru |
| 19:30 IST | Serrán (yellow card) 17'; Paartalu 37' | | Lanzarote (yellow card) 14' | Stadium: Sree Kanteerava Stadium; Attendance: 9,379; Referee: Tejas Nagvenkar; Man of the Match: Erik Paartalu (Bengaluru FC) |

| 27 January 2019 12 | Mumbai City | 1–0 | Bengaluru | Mumbai |
| 19:30 IST | Machado 29' | Report | Juanan (yellow card) 45' | Stadium: Mumbai Football Arena; Attendance: 4,725; Referee: Tejas Nagvenkar; Man of the Match: Paulo Machado (Mumbai City) |

| 30 January 2019 13 | Bengaluru | 2–1 | NorthEast United | Bengaluru |
| 19:30 IST | Komorski 14' (o.g.); Chencho 71'; Bheke (yellow card) 74' | Report | Grgić (yellow card) 28'; Leudo (yellow card) 45+1'; Galleg 60' | Stadium: Sree Kanteerava Stadium; Attendance: 11,970; Referee: C. R. Srikrishna; Man of the Match: Gurpreet Singh Sandhu (Bengaluru) |

| 6 February 2019 14 | Bengaluru | 2–2 | Kerala Blasters | Bengaluru |
| 19:30 IST | Serrán (yellow card) 26'; Paartalu (yellow card) 33'; U. Singh 69'; Chhetri 85' | Report | Stojanovic 16' (pen.); Pekuson 40' | Stadium: Sree Kanteerava Stadium; Attendance: 13,572; Referee: Tejas Nagvenkar; Man of the Match: Udanta Singh (Bengaluru) |

| 9 February 2019 15 | Chennaiyin | 2–1 | Bengaluru | Chennai |
| 19:30 IST | Jeje 32'; Nelson 42' (yellow card) 65' | | Luisma (yellow card) 47'; S. Chhetri 57'; Paartalu (yellow card) 70'; A. Chhetri (yellow card) 90+3'; Lalrindika (yellow card) 90+4' | Stadium: Jawaharlal Nehru Stadium; Attendance: 6,939; Referee: Crystal John; Man of the Match: Raphael Augusto (Chennaiyin) |

| 17 February 2019 16 | Delhi Dynamos | 3–2 | Bengaluru | Delhi |
| 19:30 IST | Dávila 9'; Crespi (yellow card) 41'; Lalhlimpuia 77', 81'; Gharami (yellow card) 87'; Rai (yellow card) 90+3' | Report | Xisco (yellow card) 12'; B. Haokip 19'; Khabra (yellow card) 50'; Sunil Chhetri 72'; Dimas (yellow card) 90+1'; Serrán (yellow card) 90+4' | Stadium: Jawaharlal Nehru Stadium; Attendance: 3,745; Referee: Adham Makhadmeh; Man of the Match: Daniel Lalhlimpuia (Delhi Dynamos) |

| 21 February 2019 17 | Bengaluru | 3–0 | Goa | Bengaluru |
| 19:30 IST | Nishu (yellow card) 25' (yellow-red card) 42'; Anto (yellow card) 31'; Juanan 50'; Udanta 58'; Khabra (yellow card) 61'; Miku 69' | Report | Desai (yellow card) 45'; Fernandes (yellow card) 72'; Peña (yellow card) 83'; Jahouh (yellow card) 90+2' | Stadium: Sree Kanteerava Stadium; Attendance: 13,275; Referee: Pranjal Banerji; Man of the Match: Miku (Bengaluru) |

| 27 February 2019 18 | Jamshedpur | 5–1 | Bengaluru | Jamshedpur |
| 19:30 IST | Fernandes 45+2'; Soosairaj 54'; Morgado 56', 57'; Calvo 61'; Tiri (yellow card) 65' | | T. Haokip 16'; Gill (yellow card) 60' (yellow-red card) 68' | Stadium: JRD Tata Sports Complex; Attendance: 14,678; Referee: Ajit Meetei; Man of the Match: Michael Soosairaj (Jamshedpur) |

==== Playoffs ====
| 7 March 2019 Semi-Finals | NorthEast United | 2–1 | Bengaluru | Guwahati |
| 19:30 IST | Tlang 20'; Mascia 90+5' | | Xisco 82' | Stadium: Indira Gandhi Athletic Stadium; Attendance: 21,786; Referee: Santosh Kumar; Man of the Match: José David Leudo (NorthEast United) |

| 11 March 2019 Semi-Finals | Bengaluru | 3–0 (4–2 agg.) | NorthEast United | Bengaluru |
| 19:30 IST | Bheke (yellow card) 63'; Miku 72'; Luisma (yellow card) 85'; Dimas (yellow card) 79' (goal) 87'; Chhetri 90+2' | Report | Tlang (yellow card) 88' | Stadium: Sree Kanteerava Stadium; Attendance: 21,636; Referee: Hamad Ali Yousef Abdulla Alali; Man of the Match: Miku (Bengaluru) |

==== Final ====
| 17 March 2019 Final | Bengaluru | 1–0 (a.e.t.) | Goa | Mumbai |
| 19:30 IST | Barrera (yellow card) 51'; Delgado (yellow card) 62'; Bheke (yellow card) 103' (goal) 117'; Miku (yellow card) 105' | Report | Fall (yellow card) 39'; Jahouh (yellow card) 47' (yellow-red card) 105'; Seriton (yellow card) 91'; Bedia (yellow card) 120' | Stadium: Mumbai Football Arena; Attendance: 7,372; Referee: Muhammad Taqi; Man of the Match: Rahul Bheke (Bengaluru FC) |

==== Table ====
| Pos | Team | Pld | W | D | L | GF | GA | GD | Pts | Qualification |
|---|---|---|---|---|---|---|---|---|---|---|
| 1 | Bengaluru (Note: Qualified for 2020 AFC Cup qualifying play-offs) (C) | 18 | 10 | 4 | 4 | 29 | 22 | +7 | 34 (Note: Head-to-head standings: Bengaluru 6 pts, Goa 0 pts.) | Advance to ISL Playoffs |
| 2 | Goa | 18 | 10 | 4 | 4 | 36 | 20 | +16 | 34 | Advance to ISL Playoffs |
| 3 | Mumbai City | 18 | 9 | 3 | 6 | 25 | 20 | +5 | 30 | Advance to ISL Playoffs |
| 4 | NorthEast United | 18 | 7 | 8 | 3 | 22 | 18 | +4 | 29 | Advance to ISL Playoffs |
| 5 | Jamshedpur | 18 | 6 | 9 | 3 | 29 | 21 | +8 | 27 | |

Source: Indian Super League
Rules for classification: 1) points; 2) head-to-head points; 3) head-to-head goal difference; 4) head-to-head goals scored; 5) goal difference; 5) number of goals scored; 6) fair play ranking; 6) drawing of lots
(C) Champions

==== Results by matchday ====
| Matchday | 1 | 2 | 3 | 4 | 5 | 6 | 7 | 8 | 9 | 10 | 11 | 12 | 13 | 14 | 15 | 16 | 17 | 18 |
|---|---|---|---|---|---|---|---|---|---|---|---|---|---|---|---|---|---|---|
| Ground | H | H | A | A | A | A | H | H | A | H | H | A | H | H | A | A | H | A |
| Result | W | D | W | W | W | W | W | W | D | D | W | L | W | D | L | L | W | L |
| Position | 1 | 1 | 1 | 3 | 1 | 2 | 1 | 1 | 1 | 1 | 1 | 2 | 1 | 1 | 1 | 1 | 1 | 1 |

Source: soccerway
A = Away; H = Home; W = Win; D = Draw; L = Loss

=== AFC Cup ===
Inter-zone play-off semi-finals

Bengaluru FC advanced to the inter-zone play-off semi-finals during 2017–18 season. The draw for the Inter-zone play-off semi-finals was held on 23 May 2018. Bengaluru FC were pitted against central Asian zone champions Turkmenistani club Altyn Asyr. Bengaluru played the first leg at home on 22 August 2018. Bengaluru were trailing by 3 goals in the game, but managed to score two goals before the end of the game. Bengaluru further suffered 2–0 defeat in the away leg and bowed out of the AFC Cup with 2–5 aggregate loss.

| 22 August 2018 | Bengaluru (India) | 2–3 | (Turkmenistan) Altyn Asyr | Bengaluru, India |
| 20:00 UTC+5:30 | Juanan (yellow card) 34'; Miku (yellow card) 43'; Anto (yellow card) 52'; Bheke 63'; Paartalu 88' | Report | Orazsähedow 11', 46'; Annadurdyýew 25'; Babajanov (yellow card) 29' | Stadium: Sree Kanteerava Stadium; Attendance: 5,832; Referee: Jumpei Iida (Japan); MVP: Wahyt Orazsähedow (Altyn Asyr) |

| 29 August 2018 | Altyn Asyr (Turkmenistan) | 2–0 (5–2 agg.) | (India) Bengaluru | Ashgabat, Turkmenistan |
| 16:30 UTC+5 | Söýünow (yellow card) 18'; Annadurdyýew 50'; Geldiýew (yellow card) 52'; Orazsähedow 58' | Report | Chhetri (yellow card) 38'; Hernández (yellow card) 57'; Miku (yellow card) 90+2' | Stadium: Köpetdag Stadium; Attendance: 12,326; Referee: Turki Al-Khudair (Saudi Arabia) |

=== Super Cup ===
As one of the top six teams in 2018–19 Indian Super League, Bengaluru FC qualified for the main round in 2019 Indian Super Cup. Bengaluru FC were scheduled to play the I-League side, Mohun Bagan A.C. in Round of 16 match. However, Mohun Bagan withdrew from the tournament and Bengaluru got a walkover and advanced to the quarter-finals and faced 2018–19 I-League champions Chennai City F.C.

| 31 March 2019 Round of 16 | Mohun Bagan | walkover | Bengaluru | Bhubaneswar |
| 17:00 IST | | | | Stadium: Kalinga Stadium |

| 4 April 2019 Quarter-final | Bengaluru | 1–2 | Chennai City | Bhubaneswar |
| 20:30 IST | Khabra (yellow card) 37'; Dimas (yellow card) 57'; Chhetri 65'; Serrán (yellow card) 82' | Report | Gordillo 15'; Manzi 54' | Stadium: Kalinga Stadium; Attendance: 1,000; Referee: Ajit Meetei; Man of the Match: Mauro Boerchio (Chennai City) |

== Coaching Staff ==
=== Management ===
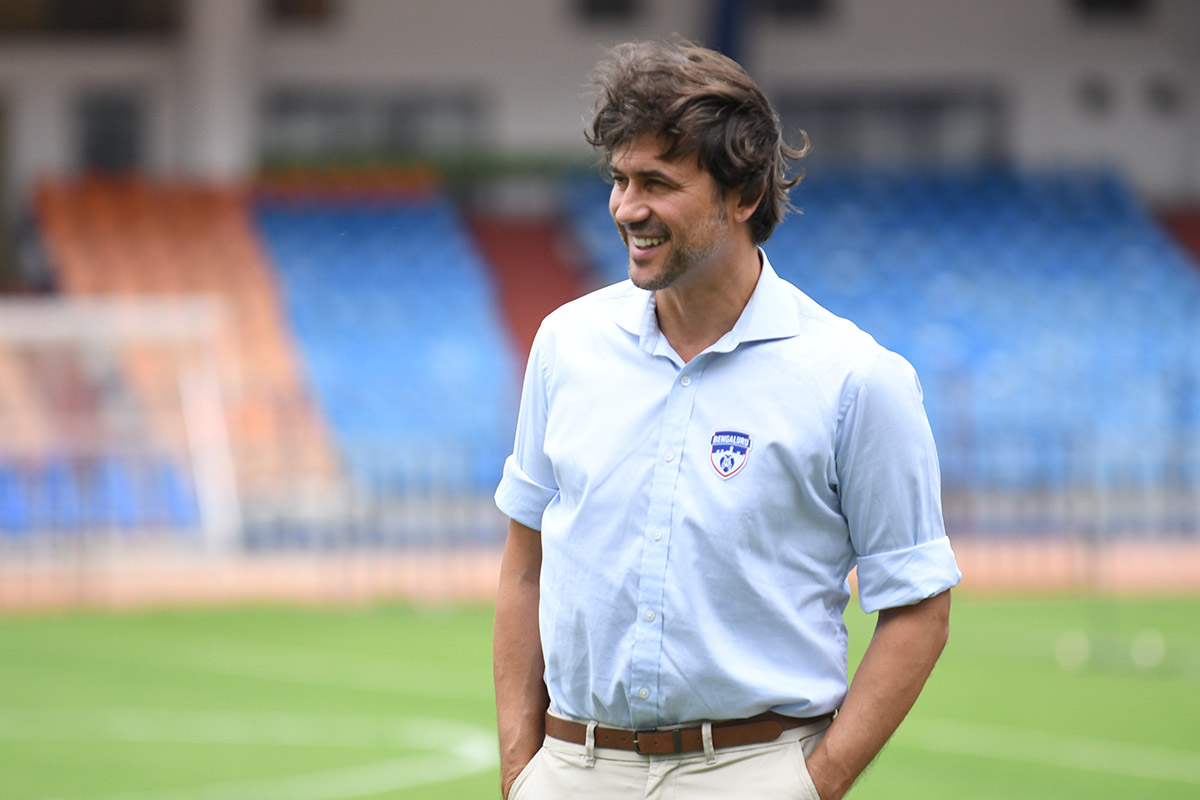
Carles Cuadrat took over as the head coach for Bengaluru FC

Albert Roca, after a successful stint of two years, parted ways with Bengaluru FC at the end of the previous season and the assistant coach Carles Cuadrat succeeded him as the head coach.

Updated 14 July 2018

| Position | Name |
|---|---|
| Head coach | (Spain) Carles Cuadrat |
| Assistant coach | (Spain) Gerard Zaragoza |
| Assistant coach (India) | (India) Naushad Moosa |
| Goalkeeping coach | (Spain) Javier Pinillos |
| Under-18 coach | (India) John Kenneth Raj |
| Head physiotherapist | (South Africa) Timothy Vadachalam |

== Player statistics ==
=== Appearances and goals ===
| No. | Pos | Nat | Player | Total | | ISL | | AFC | | Super Cup | |
| No. | Pos | Nat | Player | Apps | Goals | Apps | Goals | Apps | Goals | Apps | Goals |
Goalkeepers
| 1 | GK | (India) IND | Gurpreet Singh Sandhu | 23 | 0 | 20+0 | 0 | 2+0 | 0 | 1+0 | 0 |
| 23 | GK | (India) IND | Soram Poirei | 1 | 0 | 1+0 | 0 | 0+0 | 0 | 0+0 | 0 |
| 32 | GK | (India) IND | Aditya Patra | 0 | 0 | 0+0 | 0 | 0+0 | 0 | 0+0 | 0 |
Defenders
| 2 | DF | (India) IND | Rahul Bheke | 23 | 4 | 19+1 | 3 | 2+0 | 1 | 1+0 | 0 |
| 3 | DF | (Spain) ESP | Albert Serrán | 18 | 0 | 15+2 | 0 | 0+0 | 0 | 0+1 | 0 |
| 4 | DF | (India) IND | Sairuat Kima | 1 | 0 | 1+0 | 0 | 0+0 | 0 | 0+0 | 0 |
| 5 | DF | (Spain) ESP | Juanan | 23 | 1 | 20+0 | 1 | 2+0 | 0 | 1+0 | 0 |
| 10 | DF | (India) IND | Harmanjot Khabra | 22 | 0 | 19+1 | 0 | 1+0 | 0 | 1+0 | 0 |
| 13 | DF | (India) IND | Rino Anto | 11 | 0 | 5+4 | 0 | 2+0 | 0 | 0+0 | 0 |
| 22 | DF | (India) IND | Nishu Kumar | 21 | 1 | 18+0 | 1 | 2+0 | 0 | 1+0 | 0 |
| 26 | DF | (India) IND | Asheer Akhtar | 0 | 0 | 0+0 | 0 | 0+0 | 0 | 0+0 | 0 |
| 28 | DF | (India) IND | Parag Shrivas | 1 | 0 | 0+1 | 0 | 0+0 | 0 | 0+0 | 0 |
| 33 | DF | (India) IND | Gursimrat Singh Gill | 5 | 0 | 1+4 | 0 | 0+0 | 0 | 0+0 | 0 |
| | DF | (India) IND | Biswa Darjee | 0 | 0 | 0+0 | 0 | 0+0 | 0 | 0+0 | 0 |
| | DF | (India) IND | Rakesh Oram | 0 | 0 | 0+0 | 0 | 0+0 | 0 | 0+0 | 0 |
Midfielders
| 6 | MF | (Australia) AUS | Erik Paartalu | 16 | 3 | 13+1 | 2 | 2+0 | 1 | 0+0 | 0 |
| 8 | MF | (India) IND | Kean Lewis | 17 | 0 | 5+10 | 0 | 0+2 | 0 | 0+0 | 0 |
| 9 | MF | (Spain) ESP | Luisma | 6 | 0 | 3+3 | 0 | 0+0 | 0 | 0+0 | 0 |
| 14 | MF | (Spain) ESP | Dimas Delgado | 18 | 1 | 16+1 | 1 | 0+0 | 0 | 1+0 | 0 |
| 15 | MF | (India) IND | Bidyananda Singh | 1 | 0 | 0+0 | 0 | 0+1 | 0 | 0+0 | 0 |
| 16 | MF | (India) IND | Myron Mendes | 1 | 0 | 0+1 | 0 | 0+0 | 0 | 0+0 | 0 |
| 17 | MF | (India) IND | Boithang Haokip | 13 | 1 | 2+9 | 1 | 1+0 | 0 | 0+1 | 0 |
| 19 | MF | (Spain) ESP | Xisco Hernández | 23 | 1 | 15+5 | 1 | 2+0 | 0 | 1+0 | 0 |
| 24 | MF | (Spain) ESP | Álex Barrera | 4 | 0 | 3+0 | 0 | 0+0 | 0 | 1+0 | 0 |
| 26 | MF | (India) IND | Altamash Sayed | 0 | 0 | 0+0 | 0 | 0+0 | 0 | 0+0 | 0 |
| 35 | MF | (India) IND | Ajay Chhetri | 2 | 0 | 1+1 | 0 | 0+0 | 0 | 0+0 | 0 |
| 38 | MF | (India) IND | Robinson Singh | 0 | 0 | 0+0 | 0 | 0+0 | 0 | 0+0 | 0 |
| | MF | (India) IND | Roshan Singh | 0 | 0 | 0+0 | 0 | 0+0 | 0 | 0+0 | 0 |
| | MF | (India) IND | Namgyal Bhutia | 0 | 0 | 0+0 | 0 | 0+0 | 0 | 0+0 | 0 |
| | MF | (India) IND | Lalengzama Vangchhia | 0 | 0 | 0+0 | 0 | 0+0 | 0 | 0+0 | 0 |
| | MF | (India) IND | Leon Augustine | 0 | 0 | 0+0 | 0 | 0+0 | 0 | 0+0 | 0 |
Forwards
| 7 | FW | (Venezuela) VEN | Miku | 15 | 5 | 11+1 | 5 | 2+0 | 0 | 1+0 | 0 |
| 11 | FW | (India) IND | Sunil Chhetri | 22 | 10 | 19+0 | 9 | 2+0 | 0 | 1+0 | 1 |
| 18 | FW | (India) IND | Thongkhosiem Haokip | 8 | 1 | 1+6 | 1 | 0+1 | 0 | 0+0 | 0 |
| 21 | FW | (India) IND | Udanta Singh | 22 | 5 | 19+0 | 5 | 2+0 | 0 | 1+0 | 0 |
| 37 | FW | (India) IND | Edmund Lalrindika | 5 | 0 | 2+3 | 0 | 0+0 | 0 | 0+0 | 0 |
Players transferred out during the season
| 27 | FW | (Bhutan) BHU | Chencho Gyeltshen | 9 | 2 | 4+5 | 2 | 0+0 | 0 | 0+0 | 0 |

- Source: soccerway

Updated: 4 April 2019

=== Top scorers ===
| Rank | No. | Pos | Nat | Player | ISL | AFC | Super Cup | Total |
|---|---|---|---|---|---|---|---|---|
| 1 | 11 | FW | (India) | Sunil Chhetri | 9 | 0 | 1 | 10 |
| 2 | 7 | FW | (Venezuela) | Miku | 5 | 0 | 0 | 5 |
| 2 | 21 | MF | (India) | Udanta Singh | 5 | 0 | 0 | 5 |
| 4 | 2 | DF | (India) | Rahul Bheke | 3 | 1 | 0 | 4 |
| 5 | 6 | MF | (Australia) | Erik Paartalu | 2 | 1 | 0 | 3 |
| 6 | 27 | FW | (Bhutan) | Chencho Gyeltshen | 2 | 0 | 0 | 2 |
| 7 | 5 | DF | (Spain) | Juanan | 1 | 0 | 0 | 1 |
| 7 | 14 | MF | (Spain) | Dimas Delgado | 1 | 0 | 0 | 1 |
| 7 | 17 | MF | (India) | Boithang Haokip | 1 | 0 | 0 | 1 |
| 7 | 18 | FW | (India) | Thongkhosiem Haokip | 1 | 0 | 0 | 1 |
| 7 | 19 | MF | (Spain) | Xisco Hernandez | 1 | 0 | 0 | 1 |
| 7 | 22 | DF | (India) | Nishu Kumar | 1 | 0 | 0 | 1 |
| Own goals | | | | | 2 | 0 | 0 | 2 |
| TOTALS | | | | | 34 | 2 | 1 | 37 |

Source: soccerway
Updated: 4 April 2019

=== Clean sheets ===
| Rank | No. | Pos | Nat | Player | ISL | AFC | Super Cup | Total |
|---|---|---|---|---|---|---|---|---|
| 1 | 45 | GK | (India) | Gurpreet Singh Sandhu | 7 | 0 | 0 | 7 |
| 2 | 23 | GK | (India) | Soram Poirei | 0 | 0 | 0 | 0 |
| TOTALS | | | | | 7 | 0 | 0 | 7 |

Source: soccerway
Updated: 4 April 2019

=== Disciplinary record ===
| Rank | No. | Pos | Nat | Player | ISL | | AFC | | Super Cup | | Total | | Notes |
| Rank | No. | Pos | Nat | Player | Yellow card | Red card | Yellow card | Red card | Yellow card | Red card | Yellow card | Red card | Notes |
|---|---|---|---|---|---|---|---|---|---|---|---|---|---|
| 1 | 10 | MF | (India) | Harmanjot Khabra | 7 | 0 | 0 | 0 | 1 | 0 | 8 | 0 | Missed a game, against ATK (4 yellow cards) (13 December 2018) |
| 2 | 3 | DF | (Spain) | Albert Serrán | 4 | 0 | 0 | 0 | 1 | 0 | 5 | 0 | Missed a game, against Goa (4 yellow cards) (21 February 2019) |
| 2 | 14 | MF | (Spain) | Dimas Delgado | 3 | 1 | 0 | 0 | 1 | 0 | 4 | 1 | Missed a game, against Delhi Dynamos (red card) (26 November 2018) |
| 4 | 2 | DF | (India) | Rahul Bheke | 4 | 0 | 0 | 0 | 0 | 0 | 4 | 0 | |
| 4 | 6 | MF | (Australia) | Erik Paartalu | 4 | 0 | 0 | 0 | 0 | 0 | 4 | 0 | Missed a game, against Delhi Dynamos (4 yellow cards) (17 February 2019) |
| 4 | 7 | FW | (Venezuela) | Miku | 2 | 0 | 2 | 0 | 0 | 0 | 4 | 0 | |
| 7 | 5 | DF | (Spain) | Juanan | 2 | 0 | 1 | 0 | 0 | 0 | 3 | 0 | |
| 7 | 9 | MF | (Spain) | Xisco Hernández | 2 | 0 | 1 | 0 | 0 | 0 | 3 | 0 | |
| 9 | 9 | MF | (Spain) | Luisma | 2 | 0 | 0 | 0 | 0 | 0 | 2 | 0 | |
| 9 | 13 | DF | (India) | Rino Anto | 1 | 0 | 1 | 0 | 0 | 0 | 2 | 0 | |
| 9 | 22 | DF | (India) | Nishu Kumar | 1 | 1 | 0 | 0 | 0 | 0 | 1 | 1 | Missed a game, against Jamshedpur (red card) (27 February 2019) |
| 11 | 1 | GK | (India) | Gurpreet Singh Sandhu | 1 | 0 | 0 | 0 | 0 | 0 | 1 | 0 | |
| 11 | 11 | FW | (India) | Sunil Chhetri | 0 | 0 | 1 | 0 | 0 | 0 | 1 | 0 | |
| 11 | 24 | MF | (Spain) | Álex Barrera | 1 | 0 | 0 | 0 | 0 | 0 | 1 | 0 | |
| 11 | 33 | DF | (India) | Gursimrat Singh Gill | 0 | 1 | 0 | 0 | 0 | 0 | 0 | 1 | Missed a game, against NorthEast United (red card) (7 March 2019) |
| 11 | 35 | MF | (India) | Ajay Chhetri | 1 | 0 | 0 | 0 | 0 | 0 | 1 | 0 | |
| 11 | 37 | FW | (India) | Edmund Lalrindika | 1 | 0 | 0 | 0 | 0 | 0 | 1 | 0 | |
| TOTALS | | | | | 36 | 3 | 6 | 0 | 3 | 0 | 45 | 3 | |

Source: soccerway
Updated: 4 April 2019

== Awards ==
=== Player of the Month award ===
Awarded monthly to the player that was chosen by fan voting

| Month | Player | Votes |
|---|---|---|
| October | (Venezuela) Miku | 38% |
| November | (India) Rahul Bheke | 47% |
| December | (Australia) Erik Paartalu | 33% |
| February | (Spain) Dimas Delgado | 46% |
| March | (India) Rahul Bheke | |

=== ISL Player of the Month award ===
Awarded monthly to the player that was chosen by fan voting

| Month | Player | Votes |
|---|---|---|
| November | (India) Rahul Bheke | 53.2% |

== See also ==
- 2018–19 in Indian football
