= 2019 Indian Super League final =

Association football match

- Event: 2018–19 Indian Super League
Bengaluru	Goa
(India)	(India)
1	0
- Date: 17 March 2019
- Venue: Mumbai Football Arena, Mumbai, Maharashtra
- Man of the Match: Rahul Bheke
- Referee: Muhammad Taqi (Singapore)
- Attendance: 7,372

The 2019 Indian Super League final was the final match of the 2018–19 Indian Super League, the fifth season of the Indian Super League. It was played between Bengaluru FC and FC Goa, on 17 March 2019 at the Mumbai Football Arena, Mumbai. It was played to determine the champions of the 2018–19 season of the Indian Super League.

Bengaluru FC won their maiden Indian Super League Cup title defeating FC Goa 1–0. Rahul Bheke of Bengaluru FC won the Man of the Match award for scoring the solitary goal in the 117 minute.

== Background ==
This was Bengaluru FC's second consecutive Indian Super League final after making their debut at the 2017–18 season. Bengaluru FC previously lost the final against Chennaiyin FC 2–3.

== Match ==
17 March 2019
19:30 IST

Bengaluru	1–0	Goa
Rahul Bheke 117'	Report

Mumbai Football Arena, Mumbai
Attendance: 7,372
Referee: Muhammad Taqi Aljaafari Bin Jahari (Singapore)

Bengaluru	Goa

GK	1	(India) Gurpreet Singh Sandhu
DF	10	(India) Harmanjot Khabra
DF	2	(India) Rahul Bheke	(yellow card) 103'
DF	5	(Spain) Juanan
DF	22	(India) Nishu Kumar		(substituted off) 112'
DF	24	(Spain) Álex Barrera	(yellow card) 51'	(substituted off) 70'
MF	14	(Spain) Dimas Delgado	(yellow card) 62'
FW	21	(India) Udanta Singh		(substituted off) 112'
MF	19	(Spain) Xisco Hernández		(substituted off) 118'
FW	11	(India) Sunil Chhetri
FW	7	(Venezuela) Miku	(yellow card) 105'
Substitutes:
GK	23	(India) Soram Poirei
MF	3	(Spain) Albert Serran		(substituted on) 118'
MF	13	(India) Rino Anto
MF	17	(India) Boithang Haokip		(substituted on) 112'
MF	8	(India) Kean Lewis		(substituted on) 112'
MF	9	(Spain) Luisma		(substituted on) 70'
FW	18	(India) Thongkhosiem Haokip
Head coach:
(Spain) Carles Cuadrat

GK	32	(India) Naveen Kumar
DF	20	(India) Seriton Fernandes	(yellow card) 91'
DF	25	(Senegal) Mourtada Fall	(yellow card) 38'
DF	17	(Spain) Carlos Peña		(substituted off) 116'
MF	7	(India) Mandar Rao Dessai		(substituted off) 45'
MF	5	(Morocco) Ahmed Jahouh	(yellow card) 46' (yellow-red card) 104'
MF	24	(India) Lenny Rodrigues
MF	12	(India) Jackichand Singh		(substituted off) 109'
MF	23	(Spain) Edu Bedia	(yellow card) 119'
MF	10	(India) Brandon Fernandes
FW	8	(Spain) Ferran Corominas
Substitutes:
GK	13	(India) Mohammad Nawaz
DF	6	(India) Chinglensana Singh
MF	37	(India) Mohamed Ali
MF	21	(India) Saviour Gama		(substituted on) 45'
MF	4	(France) Hugo Boumous		(substituted on) 116'
FW	30	(Morocco) Zaid Krouch
FW	9	(India) Manvir Singh		(substituted on) 109'
Head coach:
(Spain) Sergio Lobera

Hero of the Match:
Rahul Bheke (Bengaluru)

Assistant referees:
Fourth official:

Match rules

- 90 minutes.
- 30 minutes of extra time if necessary.
- Penalty shoot-out if scores still level.
