= 2020–21 Bengaluru FC season =

8th season in existence of Bengaluru FC

Bengaluru FC
2020–21 season
- Chairman: (India) Parth Jindal
- Manager: (Germany) Marco Pezzaiuoli
- Stadium: Fatorda Stadium (Note: 2020–21 Indian Super League season was played exclusively at Goa due to COVID-19 pandemic in India)
- Indian Super League: 7th
- AFC Cup: Preliminary round 2
- Top goalscorer: League: Sunil Chhetri (8); All: Sunil Chhetri (8)
Home colours	Away colours	Third colours
- All statistics correct as of 25 February 2021.

The 2020–21 season was Bengaluru FC's eighth season as a club since its establishment in 2013.

== Background ==
=== Transfers ===
During the course of 2019–20 season, Bengaluru FC extended contracts of Juanan, Thongkhosiem Haokip and Edmund Lalrindika. At the end of the season, Bengaluru FC extended contracts of Udanta Singh, Erik Paartalu, Dimas Delgado, Ajay Chhetri, Leon Augustine, Roshan Singh and Namgyal Bhutia.

On 3 June Bengaluru FC announced signing of defender Pratik Chaudhari and club's former goalkeeper Lalthuammawia Ralte. Both the players signed with the club for two seasons. On 5 June Bengaluru FC announced signing of defenders Joe Zoherliana and Wungngayam Muirang on two year deal. On 20 June Bengaluru FC announced signing of Brazilian forward Cleiton Silva on one year deal. In August 2020, Bengaluru signed left back Ajith Kumar from Chennai City F.C. on a three-year deal for an undisclosed fee. On 18 September Bengaluru FC signed midfielder Huidrom Thoi Singh from Reliance Foundation Young Champs. On 3 October Bengaluru FC announced signing of goalkeeper Lara Sharma for three years. On 20 October Bengaluru FC announced signing of Spanish defender Fran González and Norwegian striker Kristian Opseth on season long deals.

Jamaican striker Kevaughn Frater signed for Israeli club Maccabi Netanya. Defender Nishu Kumar and goalkeeper Prabhsukhan Singh Gill signed for Kerala Blasters. On 13 September 2020, Spanish striker Manuel Onwu completed the move to Odisha FC after being on the loan the previous season. Defender Gursimrat Singh Gill signed for Bengaluru United Brazilian midfielder Raphael Augusto's contract with the club was terminated on mutual agreement, owing to personal reasons. Bengaluru FC did not renew the contract of Spanish defender Albert Serrán Defender Sairuat Kima joined Sudeva FC. Midfielder Eugeneson Lyngdoh and defender Rino Anto joined East Bengal.

In the winter transfer window, Ajay Chhetri was loaned out to SC East Bengal till the end of the season.

==== In ====
No.	Position	Player	Previous club	Transfer fee	Date	Ref
4	DF	(India) Pratik Chaudhari	Mumbai City	Free agent	3 June 2020	
28	GK	(India) Lalthuammawia Ralte	East Bengal	Free agent	3 June 2020	
24	DF	(India) Joe Zoherliana	Aizawl	Free agent	5 June 2020	
15	DF	(India) Wungngayam Muirang	Gokulam Kerala	Free agent	5 June 2020	
23	FW	(Brazil) Cleiton Silva	(Thailand) Suphanburi	Free agent	20 June 2020	
19	DF	(India) Ajith Kumar	Chennai City	Undisclosed	22 August 2020	
36	MF	(India) Huidrom Thoi Singh	Reliance Foundation Young Champs	Free agent	18 September 2020	
30	GK	(India) Lara Sharma	ATK	Free agent	3 October 2020	
55	DF	(Spain) Fran González	Mohun Bagan	Free agent	20 October 2020	
9	FW	(Norway) Kristian Opseth	(Australia) Adelaide United	Free agent	20 October 2020	
	MF	(Spain) Xisco Hernández	Odisha	Free agent	15 January 2021	
	DF	(Gabon) Yrondu Musavu-King	(France) Le Mans	Free agent	10 March 2021	

==== Out ====
No.	Position	Player	Outgoing club	Date	Fee	Ref
3	DF	(Spain) Albert Serrán	(Spain) Montañesa	1 June 2020	Free agent	
4	DF	(India) Sairuat Kima	Sudeva	1 June 2020	Free agent	
13	DF	(India) Rino Anto	East Bengal	1 June 2020	Free agent	
7	MF	(India) Eugeneson Lyngdoh	East Bengal	1 June 2020	Free agent	
29	MF	(Spain) Nili	(Greece) Levadiakos	9 June 2020	Free agent	
22	DF	(India) Nishu Kumar	Kerala Blasters	22 July 2020	Free agent	
17	FW	(Jamaica) Kevaughn Frater	(Israel) Maccabi Netanya	1 August 2020	Free agent	
31	GK	(India) Prabhsukhan Singh Gill	Kerala Blasters	9 September 2020	Free agent	
9	FW	(Spain) Manuel Onwu	Odisha	13 September 2020	Free agent	
33	DF	(India) Gursimrat Singh Gill	Bengaluru United	17 September 2020	Free agent	
8	MF	(India) Kean Lewis	Sudeva	9 October 2020	Free agent	
12	MF	(Brazil) Raphael Augusto	(Bangladesh) Abahani Limited Dhaka	17 October 2020	Free agent	
26	FW	(Jamaica) Deshorn Brown	NorthEast United	15 January 2021	Released	

==== Out on loan ====
No.	Position	Player	Outgoing club	Date	Fee	Ref
13	MF	(India) Ajay Chhetri	(India) East Bengal	15 January 2021	Unknown	

== Pre-season and friendlies ==
Bengaluru FC started pre-season with a friendly against Hyderabad FC on 7 November 2020 at Dempo SC ground, in Goa. Bengaluru drew the game 1–1 with Wungngayam Muirang scoring the opening goal in first half. Aridane Santana scored from spot to equalise for Hyderabad in second half.

7 November 2020 Friendly	Bengaluru	1–1	Hyderabad	Ella, Goa
	Muirang	Report	(pen.) Santana	Stadium: Dempo SC Ground

13 November 2020 Friendly	Bengaluru	0–1	Mumbai	Nagoa, Goa
			Boumous	Stadium: Nagoa ground

=== Mid-season friendlies ===
14 December 2020 Friendly	Bengaluru	1–1	Kerala Blasters	Goa
	Zoherliana	Report	Seityasen

5 April 2021 Friendly	Bengaluru	1–0	FC Goa	Goa
	Silva	Report

== Competitions ==
=== Overview ===
Competition	First match	Last match	Starting round	Final position	Record							
Competition	First match	Last match	Starting round	Final position	Pld	W	D	L	GF	GA	GD	Win %
Super League	22 November 2020	25 February 2021	Matchday-1	Matchday-20	20	5	7	8	26	28	−2	25.00
AFC Cup	14 April 2021	–	Preliminary-round	–	1	1	0	0	5	0	+5	100.00
Total					21	6	7	8	31	28	+3	28.57

Last updated: 31 May 2021
Source: Competitions

=== Indian Super League ===
==== League table ====
Pos	Team	Pld	W	D	L	GF	GA	GD	Pts
5	Hyderabad	20	6	11	3	27	19	+8	29
6	Jamshedpur	20	7	6	7	21	22	−1	27
7	Bengaluru	20	5	7	8	26	28	−2	22
8	Chennaiyin	20	3	11	6	17	23	−6	20
9	East Bengal	20	3	8	9	22	33	−11	17

Source: Indian Super League
Rules for classification: 1) points; 2) head-to-head points; 3) head-to-head goal difference; 4) head-to-head goals scored; 5) goal difference; 6) number of goals scored; 7) fair play ranking; 8) drawing of lots

==== Results by matchday ====
Matchday	1	2	3	4	5	6	7	8	9	10	11	12	13	14	15	16	17	18	19	20
Ground	A	H	A	H	H	A	A	H	H	H	A	A	H	A	A	H	H	A	H	A
Result	D	D	W	D	W	W	L	L	L	L	D	L	D	D	W	D	L	W	L	L
Position	3	6	4	4	4	3	3	4	5	6	6	7	7	7	6	6	6	6	7	7

Updated to match(es) played on 25 February 2021. Source: soccerway
A = Away; H = Home; W = Win; D = Draw; L = Loss

==== Matches ====
22 November 2020 1	Goa	2–2	Bengaluru	Margao
19:30 IST	Doungel (yellow card) 35'; Angulo (yellow card) 47' (goal) 66', 69'; Bedia (yellow card) 75'; González (yellow card) 90'	Report	Silva 27'; Wangjam (yellow card) 34'; Juanan 57'	Stadium: Fatorda Stadium; Attendance: 0 Referee: C. R. Srikrishna; Man of the Match: Igor Angulo (Goa)

28 November 2020 2	Bengaluru	0–0	Hyderabad	Margao
19:30 IST	Paartalu (yellow card) 23'; Khabra (yellow card) 83'	Report		Stadium: Fatorda Stadium; Attendance: 0 Referee: Santosh Kumar; Man of the Match: Chinglensana Singh (Hyderabad)

4 December 2020 3	Chennaiyin	0–1	Bengaluru	Bambolim
19:30 IST	Sabia (yellow card) 21'; Crivellaro (yellow card) 48'; Singh (yellow card) 54'	Report	Kuruniyan (yellow card) 7'; Wangjam (yellow card) 51'; Chhetri 56' (pen.)	Stadium: GMC Athletic Stadium; Attendance: 0 Referee: Rahul Kumar Gupta; Man of the Match: Suresh Singh Wangjam (Bengaluru)

8 December 2020 4	Bengaluru	2–2	NorthEast United	Margao
19:30 IST (UTC+05:30)	Juanan 13'; Bheke (yellow card) 21'; Paartalu (yellow card) 26'; Udanta 70'	Report	Machado 4', 78'; Rochharzela (yellow card) 32'; Gurjinder (yellow card) 36'; Camara (yellow card) 73'; Ninthoi (yellow card) 80'; Gurmeet (yellow card) 83'; Britto (yellow card) 90'	Stadium: Fatorda Stadium; Attendance: 0 Referee: Tejas Nagvenkar; Man of the Match: Luís Machado (NorthEast United)

13 December 2020 5	Bengaluru	4–2	Kerala Blasters	Margao
19:30 IST	Silva 29'; Juanan (yellow card) 38'; Kuruniyan (yellow card) 45'; Paartalu 52'; Dimas 53'; Chhetri 65'; Khabra (yellow card) 90'; Muirang (yellow card) 90'	Report	Rahul 17'; Lalruatthara (yellow card) 55'; Murray 61'; Nishu (yellow card) 77'; Sandeep (yellow card) 90'	Stadium: Fatorda Stadium; Attendance: 0 Referee: Crystal John; Man of the Match: Dimas Delgado (Bengaluru)

17 December 2020 6	Odisha	1–2	Bengaluru	Bambolim
19:30 IST	Taylor 71'; Bora (yellow card) 80'	Report	Paartalu (yellow card) 30'; Chhetri 38'; Silva 79'; Pratik (yellow card) 84'; Khabra (yellow card) 90+3'	Stadium: GMC Athletic Stadium; Attendance: 0 Referee: Santosh Kumar; Man of the Match: Cleiton Silva (Bengaluru FC)

21 December 2020 7	ATK Mohun Bagan	1–0	Bengaluru	Margao
19:30 IST	Williams 33'	Report	Juanan (yellow card) 5'; Bheke (yellow card) 44'	Stadium: Fatorda Stadium; Attendance: 0 Referee: C. R. Srikrishna; Man of the Match: David Williams (ATK Mohun Bagan)

28 December 2020 8	Bengaluru	0–1	Jamshedpur	Margao
19:30 IST	Suresh (yellow card) 32'; Paartalu (yellow card) 62'; Bheke (yellow card) 73'; Silva (yellow card) 87'	Report	Eze 79'	Stadium: Fatorda Stadium; Attendance: 0 Referee: L Ajitkumar Meitei; Man of the Match: Rehenesh TP (Jamshedpur)

5 January 2021 9	Bengaluru	1–3	Mumbai City	Margao
19:30 IST	Chhetri (yellow card) 61' (goal) 79' (pen.); Khabra (yellow card) 81'	Report	Fall 9'; Bipin 15'; Jahouh (yellow card) 40' (yellow-red card) 86'; Ranawade (yellow card) 58'; Ogbeche 85' (yellow card) 87'	Stadium: Fatorda Stadium; Attendance: 0 Referee: C. R. Srikrishna; Man of the Match: Bipin Singh (Mumbai City)
Note: Last game under Carles Cuadrat

9 January 2021 10	Bengaluru	0–1	East Bengal	Margao
19:30 IST	Ajith (yellow card) 20'; Dimas (yellow card) 22'; Paartalu (yellow card) 40'	Report	Steinmann 20'	Stadium: Fatorda Stadium; Attendance: 0 Referee: Harish Kundu; Man of the Match: Debjit Majumder (East Bengal)

12 January 2021 11	NorthEast United	1–1	Bengaluru	Vasco
19:30 IST	Machado 27'	Report	Paartalu (yellow card) 29'; Bheke 50'	Stadium: Tilak Maidan Stadium; Attendance: 0 Referee: Tejas Nagvenkar; Man of the Match: Lalengmawia (NorthEast United)

20 January 2021 12	Kerala Blasters	2–1	Bengaluru	Bambolim
19:30 IST	Puitea 73'; Rahul 90+4' (yellow card) 90+5'	Report	Silva 24' (yellow card) 90+5'; Juanan (yellow card) 53'	Stadium: GMC Athletic Stadium; Attendance: 0 Referee: Harish Kundu; Man of the Match: Rahul Kannoly Praveen (Kerala Blasters)

24 January 2021 13	Bengaluru	1–1	Odisha	Margao
19:30 IST	Paartalu 82'	Report	Maurício 8'; Vinit (yellow card) 47'; Tratt (yellow card) 49'; Onwu (yellow card) 79'; Alexander (yellow card) 90'	Stadium: Fatorda Stadium; Attendance: 0 Referee: Tejas Nagvenkar; Man of the Match: Cleiton Silva (Bengaluru)

28 January 2021 14	Hyderabad	2–2	Bengaluru	Vasco
19:30 IST	Aridane 86'; Sandaza 90+1'; Danu (yellow card) 90+3'	Report	Chhetri 9'; Fran (yellow card) 15'; Parag (yellow card) 54'; Leon 61'; Paartalu (yellow card) 82'	Stadium: Tilak Maidan Stadium; Attendance: 0 Referee: Pranjal Banerjee; Man of the Match: Aridane Santana (Hyderabad FC)

2 February 2021 15	East Bengal	0–2	Bengaluru	Vasco
19:30 IST	Pilkington (yellow card) 90+3'; Holloway (yellow card) 90+3'	Report	Silva 11' (yellow card) 65'; Debjit 45' (o.g.); Bheke (yellow card) 90+3'; Pratik (yellow card) 90+3'	Stadium: Tilak Maidan Stadium; Attendance: 0 Referee: C. R. Srikrishna; Man of the Match: Sunil Chhetri (Bengaluru FC)

5 February 2021 16	Bengaluru	0–0	Chennaiyin	Margao
19:30 IST	Ajith (yellow card) 21'; Pratik (yellow card) 80'	Report	Jerry (yellow card) 50'; Esmaël (yellow card) 84'; Thoi (yellow card) 87'	Stadium: Fatorda Stadium; Attendance: 0 Referee: Pranjal Banerjee; Man of the Match: Gurpreet Singh Sandhu (Bengaluru FC)

9 February 2021 17	Bengaluru	0–2	ATK Mohun Bagan	Margao
19:30 IST	Pratik (yellow card) 36'; Khabra (yellow card) 44'; Chhetri (yellow card) 90'	Report	Krishna 36'; Marcelinho 44'	Stadium: Fatorda Stadium; Attendance: 0 Referee: Rowan Arumugam; Man of the Match: Marcelinho (ATK Mohun Bagan)

15 February 2021 18	Mumbai City	2–4	Bengaluru	Bambolim
19:30 IST	Bipin (yellow card) 45'; Le Fondre 50', 72'	Report	Silva 1', 22'; Parag (yellow card) 15'; Fran (yellow card) 29'; Khabra (yellow card) 42'; Chhetri (yellow card) 52' (goal) 57', 90+4'; Kuruniyan (yellow card) 78'; Edmund (yellow card) 83'; Gurpreet (yellow card) 87'	Stadium: GMC Athletic Stadium; Attendance: 0 Referee: Rahul Kumar Gupta; Man of the Match: Sunil Chhetri (Bengaluru)

21 February 2021 19	Bengaluru	1–2	Goa	Margao
17:00 IST	Kuruniyan (yellow card) 19'; Suresh 33'; Dimas (yellow card) 79'	Report	Angulo 20'; Redeem 23'; Romario (yellow card) 60'	Stadium: Fatorda Stadium; Attendance: 0 Referee: Crystal John; Man of the Match: Glan Martins (Goa)

25 February 2021 20	Jamshedpur	3–2	Bengaluru	Vasco
19:30 IST	Eze 16'; Doungel 34'; Grande 41'; Monroy (yellow card) 86'; Laldinliana (yellow card) 90'	Report	Muirang (yellow card) 15'; González 62'; Pratik (yellow card) 65'; Chhetri 71'; Paartalu (yellow card) 74'	Stadium: Tilak Maidan Stadium; Attendance: 0 Referee: Rowan Arumughan; Man of the Match: Aitor Monroy (Jamshedpur)

=== AFC Cup ===
ATK, who finished runners-up in the league phase of the 2019–20 Indian Super League, merged with 2019–20 I-League champions Mohun Bagan and qualified automatically to the AFC Cup group stage. Third-placed team in 2019–20 Indian Super League season, Bengaluru FC qualified for 2021 AFC Cup qualifiers. This will be Bengaluru's sixth appearance in the tournament.

==== Qualifying play-offs ====
Preliminary round 2

14 April 2021	Bengaluru (India)	5–0	(Nepal) Tribhuvan Army	Bambolim
19:30 UTC+5:30	Bheke 51', 65'; Chhetri 52'; Silva 61', 63'	Stats Report; Report		Stadium: GMC Athletic Stadium; Attendance: 0 Referee: Ali Reda (Lebanon); MVP: Rahul Bheke (Bengaluru FC)

Play-off round

Due to the lockdown and travel restrictions in Bangladesh, the AFC Sub-Committee decided that Abahani Limited Dhaka are considered to have withdrawn from the AFC Cup 2021 and awarded the Playoff Stage slot to Eagles FC. Playoff Stage match supposed to be hosted by Bengaluru FC, moved to Maldives, which is hosting Group D matches, where the winner of Playoff will be placed. Due to the COVID-19 pandemic Play-off round between Bengaluru FC and Eagles FC scheduled for May 2021 postponed to 15 August 2021.

== Coaching staff ==
=== Management ===
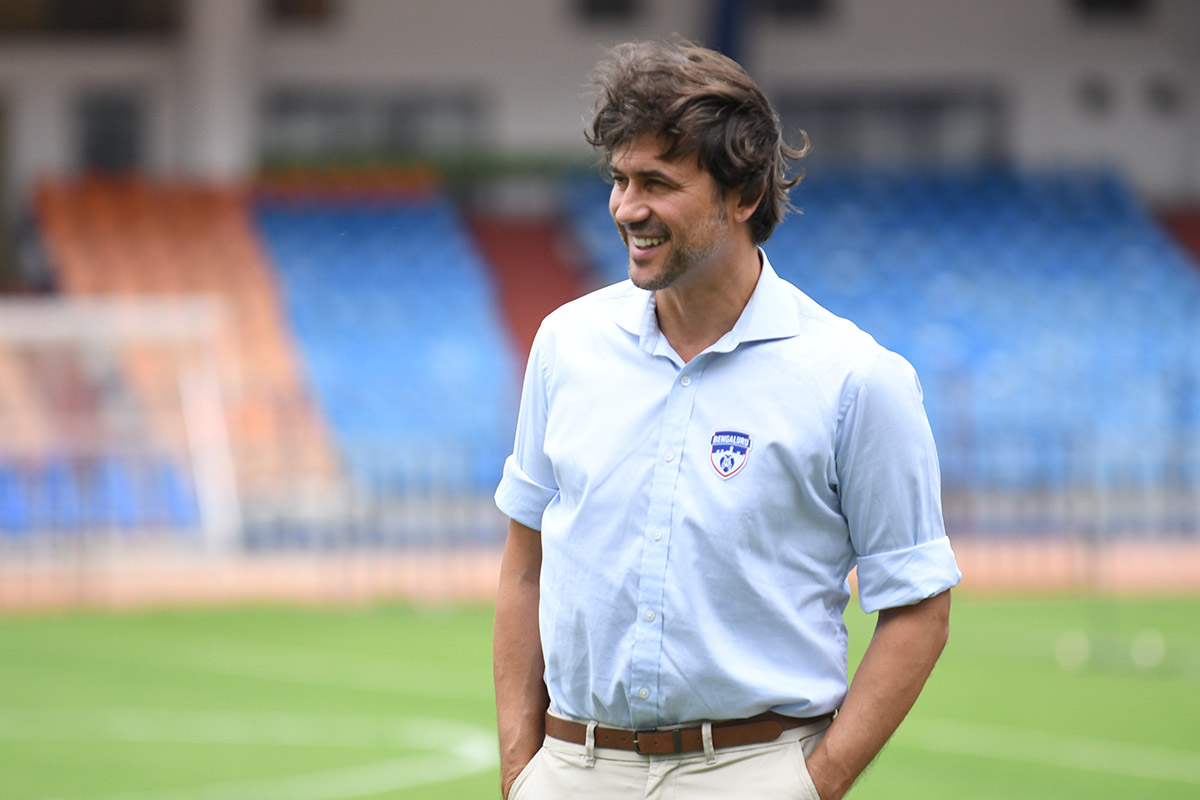
Carles Cuadrat, Bengaluru FC's head coach for 2020–21 season

After poor outings during the ongoing season, on 6 January 2021, it was announced that Carles Cuadrat and Bengaluru FC decided to mutually part ways. Naushad Moosa, the assistant coach and the head coach of Bengaluru FC B, was appointed as a caretaker coach. Soon after the departure of Carles, the fitness coach Mikel Guillen too parted ways with the club.

As of 26 February 2021

Position	Name
Head coach	(Germany) Marco Pezzaiuoli
Assistant Coach	(Spain) Javier Pinillos
Assistant Coach/Reserve team Head Coach	(India) Naushad Moosa
Goalkeeping Coach	(Spain) Julen Esnaola
Physiotherapist	(Spain) Senen Alvarez
Team Manager	(India) Rosewall Da Cunha
Video Analyst	(India) Alwin Lawrence
Masseur	(India) Manu Prasad
Kit Boy	(India) Gireesh PM

== Player statistics ==
=== Appearances and goals ===
No.	Pos	Nat	Player	Total		ISL		AFC	
No.	Pos	Nat	Player	Apps	Goals	Apps	Goals	Apps	Goals
Goalkeepers
1	GK	(India) IND	Gurpreet Singh Sandhu	20	0	19+0	0	1+0	0
28	GK	(India) IND	Lalthuammawia Ralte	1	0	1+0	0	0+0	0
30	GK	(India) IND	Lara Sharma	0	0	0+0	0	0+0	0
34	GK	(India) IND	Sharon Padattil	0	0	0+0	0	0+0	0
Defenders
2	DF	(India) IND	Rahul Bheke	16	3	13+2	1	1+0	2
4	DF	(India) IND	Pratik Chaudhari	16	0	10+5	0	0+1	0
5	DF	(Spain) ESP	Juanan	15	2	14+0	2	1+0	0
10	DF	(India) IND	Harmanjot Khabra	17	0	16+0	0	1+0	0
15	DF	(India) IND	Wungngayam Muirang	2	0	1+1	0	0+0	0
19	DF	(India) IND	Ajith Kumar	9	0	6+2	0	0+1	0
24	DF	(India) IND	Joe Zoherliana	0	0	0+0	0	0+0	0
25	DF	(India) IND	Namgyal Bhutia	3	0	0+2	0	0+1	0
29	DF	(India) IND	Parag Shrivas	11	0	8+3	0	0+0	0
35	DF	(India) IND	Biswa Kumar Darjee	0	0	0+0	0	0+0	0
55	DF	(Spain) ESP	Fran González	18	1	10+8	1	0+0	0
	DF	(Gabon) GAB	Yrondu Musavu-King	1	0	0+0	0	1+0	0
Midfielders
6	MF	(Australia) AUS	Erik Paartalu	19	2	17+1	2	1+0	0
14	MF	(Spain) ESP	Dimas Delgado	13	1	10+3	1	0+0	0
22	MF	(India) IND	Ashique Kuruniyan	9	0	7+1	0	1+0	0
27	MF	(India) IND	Suresh Singh Wangjam	20	1	18+1	1	1+0	0
31	MF	(India) IND	Leon Augustine	9	1	2+7	1	0+0	0
32	MF	(India) IND	Roshan Singh	2	0	0+2	0	0+0	0
33	MF	(India) IND	Emanuel Lalchhanchhuaha	0	0	0+0	0	0+0	0
36	MF	(India) IND	Huidrom Thoi Singh	0	0	0+0	0	0+0	0
37	MF	(India) IND	Amay Morajkar	8	0	2+6	0	0+0	0
	MF	(Spain) ESP	Xisco Hernández	6	0	3+3	0	0+0	0
	MF	(India) IND	Damaitphang Lyngdoh	1	0	0+0	0	0+1	0
	MF	(India) IND	Muhammad Inayath	0	0	0+0	0	0+0	0
Forwards
11	FW	(India) IND	Sunil Chhetri	21	9	20+0	8	1+0	1
17	FW	(India) IND	Edmund Lalrindika	4	0	0+3	0	0+1	0
18	FW	(India) IND	Thongkhosiem Haokip	5	0	0+5	0	0+0	0
21	FW	(India) IND	Udanta Singh	18	1	13+4	1	1+0	0
23	FW	(Brazil) BRA	Cleiton Silva	19	9	18+0	7	1+0	2
	FW	(India) IND	Sivasakthi Narayanan	0	0	0+0	0	0+0	0
	FW	(India) IND	Akashdeep Singh	0	0	0+0	0	0+0	0
Players transferred out during the season
13	MF	(India) IND	Ajay Chhetri	0	0	0+0	0	0+0	0
26	FW	(Jamaica) JAM	Deshorn Brown	10	0	5+5	0	0+0	0
9	FW	(Norway) NOR	Kristian Opseth	15	0	8+7	0	0+0	0

- Source: soccerway

Updated: 14 April 2021

=== Goal scorers ===
Rank	No.	Pos	Nat	Player	ISL	AFC	Total
1	11	FW	(India)	Sunil Chhetri	8	1	9
1	23	FW	(Brazil)	Cleiton Silva	7	2	9
3	2	DF	(India)	Rahul Bheke	1	2	3
4	5	DF	(Spain)	Juanan	2	0	2
4	6	MF	(Australia)	Erik Paartalu	2	0	2
6	14	MF	(Spain)	Dimas Delgado	1	0	1
6	19	MF	(India)	Udanta Singh	1	0	1
6	27	MF	(India)	Suresh Singh Wangjam	1	0	1
6	31	MF	(India)	Leon Augustine	1	0	1
6	55	MF	(Spain)	Fran González	1	0	1
Own goals					1	0	1
Total					26	5	31

Source: soccerway
Updated: 14 April 2021

=== Clean sheets ===
Rank	No.	Pos	Nat	Player	ISL	AFC	Total
1	1	GK	(India)	Gurpreet Singh Sandhu	4	1	5
2	31	GK	(India)	Lalthuammawia Ralte	0	0	0
TOTALS					4	1	5

Source: soccerway
Updated: 14 April 2021

=== Disciplinary record ===
Rank	No.	Pos	Nat	Player	ISL		AFC		Total		Notes
Rank	No.	Pos	Nat	Player	Yellow card	Red card	Yellow card	Red card	Yellow card	Red card	Notes
1	6	MF	(Australia)	Erik Paartalu	8	0	0	0	8	0	Missed a game, against Mumbai City (4 yellow cards) (5 January 2021) Missed a game, against East Bengal (7 yellow cards) (2 February 2021)
2	10	DF	(India)	Harmanjot Khabra	6	0	0	0	6	0	Missed a game, against East Bengal (4 yellow cards) (9 January 2021)
3	4	DF	(India)	Pratik Chaudhari	5	0	0	0	5	0	Missed a game, against Mumbai City (4 yellow cards) (15 February 2021)
4	2	DF	(India)	Rahul Bheke	4	0	0	0	4	0	Missed a game, against Chennaiyin (4 yellow cards) (5 February 2021)
4	22	MF	(India)	Ashique Kuruniyan	4	0	0	0	4	0	Missed a game, against Jamshedpur (4 yellow cards) (25 February 2021)
6	5	DF	(Spain)	Juanan	3	0	0	0	3	0	
6	11	FW	(India)	Sunil Chhetri	3	0	0	0	3	0	
6	23	FW	(Brazil)	Cleiton Silva	3	0	0	0	3	0	
6	27	MF	(India)	Suresh Singh Wangjam	3	0	0	0	3	0	
10	14	MF	(Spain)	Dimas Delgado	2	0	0	0	2	0	
10	15	DF	(India)	Wungngayam Muirang	2	0	0	0	2	0	
10	19	DF	(India)	Ajith Kumar	2	0	0	0	2	0	
10	29	DF	(India)	Parag Shrivas	2	0	0	0	2	0	
10	55	DF	(Spain)	Fran González	2	0	0	0	2	0	
15	1	GK	(India)	Gurpreet Singh Sandhu	1	0	0	0	1	0	
15	17	FW	(India)	Edmund Lalrindika	1	0	0	0	1	0	

Source: soccerway
Updated: 14 April 2021

== See also ==
- 2020–21 in Indian football
