= Luisma =

Luisma may refer to:

- Luis Manuel Seijas (born 1986), Venezuelan footballer
- Luisma (footballer, born 1989), Spanish footballer
- Luisma, a genus of ferns in Polypodiaceae family
