= Erik Paartalu =

Australian soccer player (born 1986)

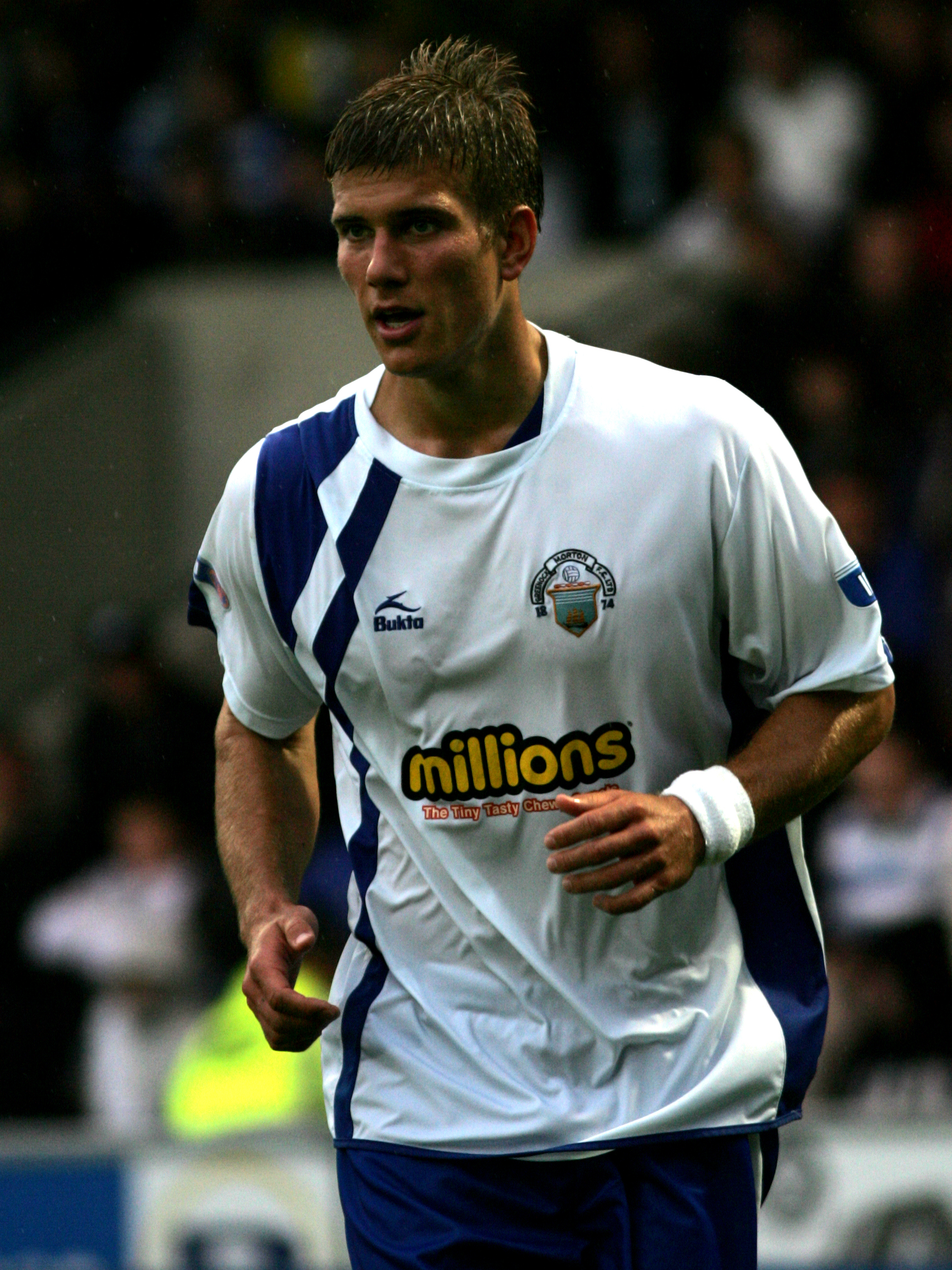
- Paartalu with Greenock Morton in 2009

Personal information
- Full name: Erik Endel Paartalu
- Date of birth: 3 May 1986 (age 40)
- Place of birth: Sydney, New South Wales, Australia
- Height: 1.93 m (6 ft 4 in)
- Position: Defensive midfielder

Youth career
- Northern Spirit
- 2000–2001: NSWIS

Senior career*
Years	Team	Apps	(Gls)
2003–2004	Northern Spirit	3	(0)
2004	Northern Tigers	17	(4)
2004–2006	Parramatta Eagles	28	(2)
2006–2008	Gretna	35	(4)
2008	→ Stirling Albion (loan)	10	(1)
2008–2010	Greenock Morton	58	(6)
2010–2013	Brisbane Roar	79	(10)
2013	Tianjin Teda	30	(4)
2014	Muangthong United	21	(2)
2014–2016	Melbourne City	40	(7)
2016	Jeonbuk Hyundai Motors	2	(0)
2016–2017	Al Kharaitiyat	9	(0)
2017–2021	Bengaluru	67	(9)
Total		399	(49)

International career
2003	Australia U17	3	(0)
2013	Australia	2	(0)
- * Club domestic league appearances and goals

Erik Endel Paartalu (born 3 May 1986) is an Australian former professional soccer player who played as a defensive midfielder. He has played professionally in Scotland, Australia, China, Qatar, South Korea, Thailand and India.

== Early life ==
Paartalu was born on 3 May 1986 in Sydney, New South Wales, Australia. He is of Estonian descent.

== Club career ==
=== NSL ===
Paartalu began his career with Northern Spirit in the National Soccer League, after stints with the Spirit youth team and the New South Wales Institute of Sport. His NSL career at the Spirit was however limited to a single appearance as a substitute on 11 January 2004 against the Melbourne Knights.

After the dissolution of the Northern Spirit, Paartalu moved to the Northern Tigers in the New South Wales Winter Super League where he played 17 matches scoring four goals in the 2004 season.

During 2004, Paartalu moved to the Parramatta Eagles who were then playing in the National Premier Leagues NSW. He continued with the Eagles until the latter half of the 2006 season, before he decided to take his chances on a career in the United Kingdom.

=== Scotland ===
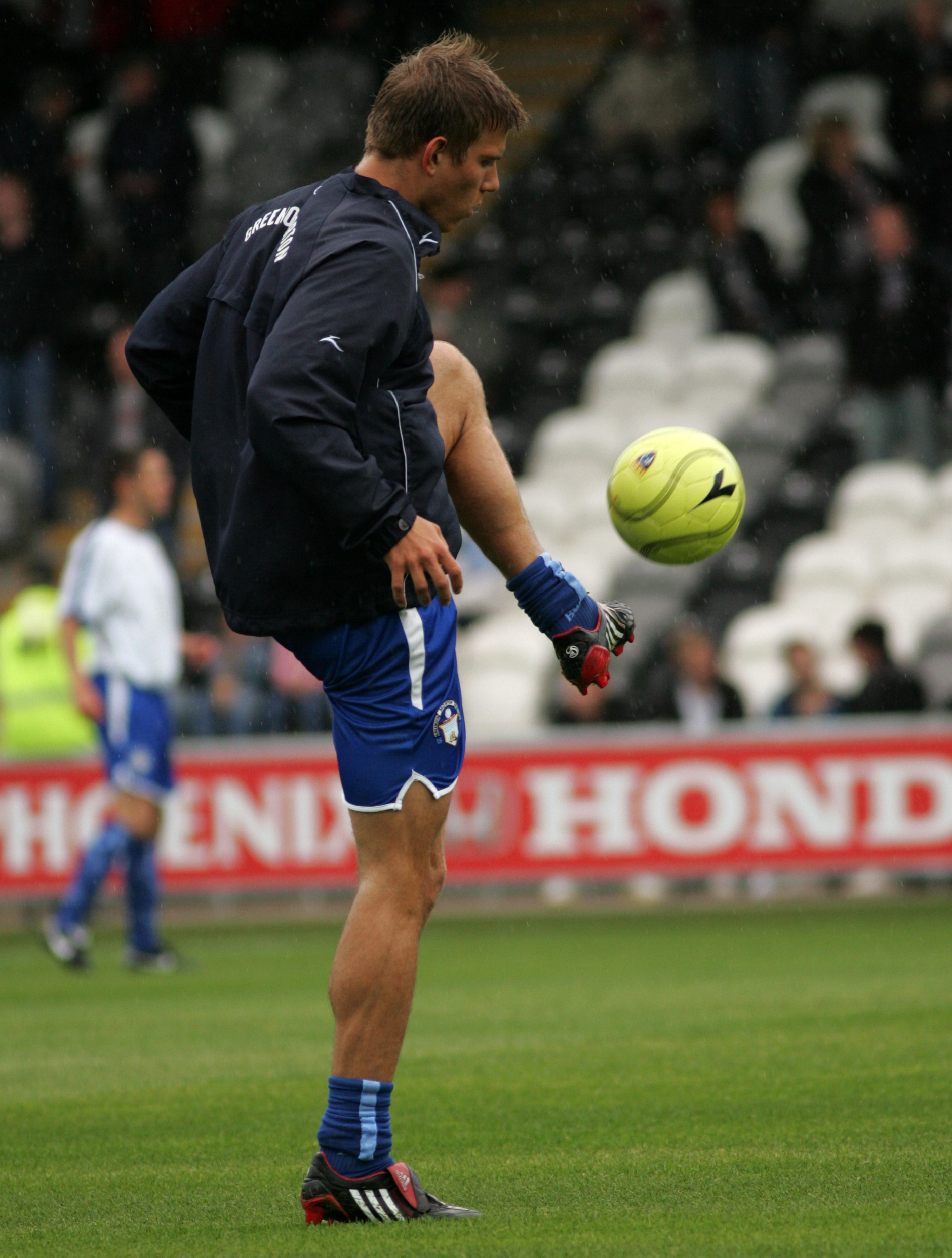
Paartalu in 2009

After a trial with Doncaster in League One it was expected he would sign a contract until the departure of manager Dave Penney put an end to the deal. Arriving at Gretna in September Paartalu was signed on a short-term contract after a trial. A number of impressive performances led to a two-and-a-half-year contract being signed in January 2007. Paartalu joined Stirling Albion on 1 January 2008 on a loan deal from Gretna until the end of the 2007/2008 season. Paartalu made his debut for the Binos against Hamilton on 5 January 2008 at New Douglas Park. In his second game he scored his first and only goal for the club, in a 4–1 defeat to Livingston.

Paartalu was released by Gretna in March 2008 due to them entering administration. He then joined Greenock Morton. After helping Morton stay in the First Division, Paartalu signed a two-year deal at the end of April 2008 to keep him at Cappielow until 2010.

=== Brisbane Roar ===
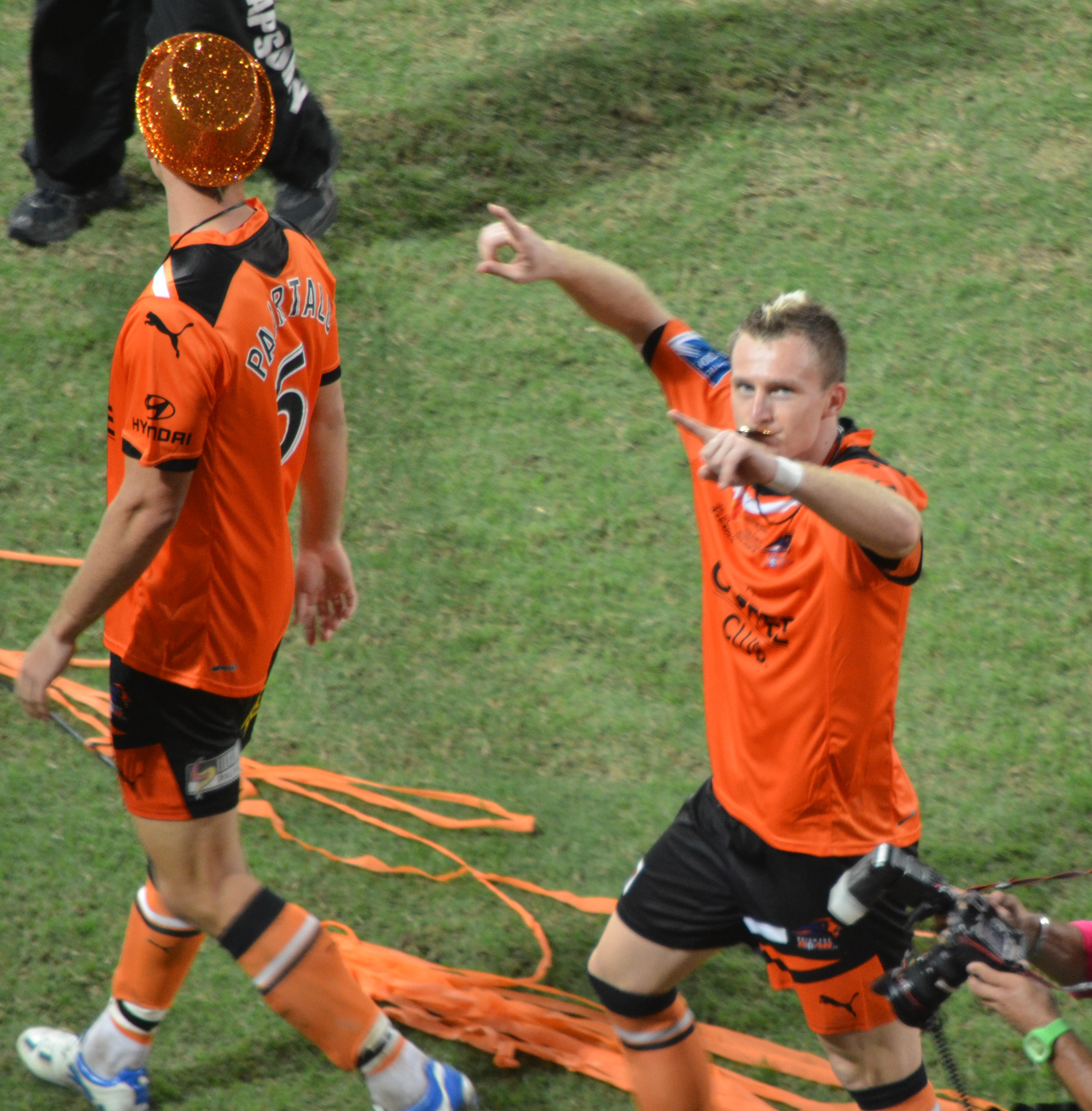
Paartalu (left) celebrating Brisbane Roar's 2012 A-League Grand Final win with Besart Berisha.

With his contract at Morton running out in the summer, Paartalu signed a pre-contract agreement with Brisbane Roar on 24 February 2010. Paartalu became an important player for Brisbane, a linchpin in the midfield and scoring crucial goals. Paartalu's defining moment at the Roar came in the 2011 A-League Grand Final, where he scored the equaliser with the last touch of the game in the 120th minute. He also went on to score the Roar's second penalty in the shootout against the Mariners. Paartalu was awarded the A-League Solo Goal of the Year for the 2010–11 season for his volley against Gold Coast United in the last game of the regular season.

In Brisbane's first match of the 2011–12 finals series, Paartalu's powerful strike sealed a 2–0 win for Brisbane in the first leg against the Central Coast.

Paartalu started in 85 consecutive games for Brisbane Roar in the A-League and the AFC Champions League in both the 2010–11 and 2011–12 seasons, including the A-League finals series.

=== Tianjin Teda ===
On 21 January 2013 it was confirmed that Paartalu had signed a three-year deal with Tianjin Teda in the Chinese Super League.

=== Muangthong United ===
After leaving Tianjin Teda in February 2014, Paartalu signed for Muangthong United in the Thai Premier League.

=== Melbourne City ===
In July 2014, Paartalu was offered a to be signed as a domestic marquee player by Newcastle Jets, but he opted to see out his contract with Muangthong United. In September Newcastle Jets reopened talks with Paartalu, following the departure of Craig Goodwin from the club. However, despite the courting and lucrative offer by Newcastle Jets, on 15 September Paartalu signed a four-year deal with Melbourne City under the salary cap, saying "I want to be at a club with an ambition to be successful on and off the field and Melbourne City FC is that club." After 40 games and 7 goals for the club across nearly two season, Paartalu was released by the club to pursue opportunities in South Korea.

=== Jeonbuk Hyundai Motors ===
Following his release from Melbourne City, Paartalu joined K League Classic side Jeonbuk Hyundai Motors on a one-year deal. However, after just three months with the team, Paartalu was dropped from the squad, with coach Chio Kang-hee asking the midfielder to train alone.

=== Al Kharaitiyat ===
In October 2016, Paartalu joined Qatari Stars League club Al Kharaitiyat.

=== Bengaluru FC ===
On 5 July 2017, Paartalu joined Indian Super League club Bengaluru FC on a one-year deal. In November, he scored a brace against Delhi Dynamos. On 14 March 2018, his contract was extended until the end of 2020. Paartalu was part of the 2018–19 Indian Super League winning squad and ended the following 2019–20 season as the club's highest assist getter with five contributions to his name. Paartalu signed a two-year extension to his contract with Bengaluru FC at the end of the 2019-20 campaign. "Bengaluru has held a special place in my heart for the past three years. Every time I leave the city, I am somehow drawn back to it," Paartalu said after putting pen to paper. In September 2021, Bengaluru FC announced that Paartalu and the club had parted ways.

== International career ==
Paartalu represented Australia at the 2003 FIFA U-17 World Championship. Paartalu played in all three of Australia's three games in the tournament, including losses against Argentina and Nigeria. On 21 February 2012 he was selected to play for the "Socceroos" against Saudi Arabia national football team in a World Cup qualification match. Paartalu also represented the Australian National Team in two games at the 2013 EAFF East Asian Cup, with appearances against South Korea and China PR.

== Career statistics ==
=== Club ===
As of match played on 9 January 2020

Club	Season	League			Cup		Other		Total	
Club	Season	Division	Apps	Goals	Apps	Goals	Apps	Goals	Apps	Goals
Northern Spirit	2003–04	National Soccer League	1	0	—		—		1	0
Northern Tigers	2004	National Premier Leagues NSW 2	17	4	—		—		28	8
Gretna	2007–08	Scottish Premier League	9	0	2	0	—		11	0
Sitrling Albion (loan)	2007–08	Scottish First Division	10	1	0	0	—		10	1
Greenock Morton	2007–08	Scottish First Division	5	0	0	0	—		5	0
Greenock Morton	2008–09	Scottish First Division	27	3	5	1	—		32	4
Greenock Morton	2009–10	Scottish First Division	26	3	1	0	—		27	3
Greenock Morton	Total		58	6	6	1	—		64	7
Brisbane Roar	2010–11	A-League	33	4	—		—		33	4
Brisbane Roar	2011–12	A-League	30	4	—		—		30	4
Brisbane Roar	2012–13	A-League	16	2	—		6 (Note: Appearances in AFC Champions League)	0	22	2
Brisbane Roar	Total		79	10	—		6	0	85	10
Tianjin Teda	2013	Chinese Super League	30	4	0	0	—		30	4
Muangthong United	2014	Thai Premier League	21	2			—		21	2
Melbourne City	2014–15	A-League	26	3	0	0	—		26	3
Melbourne City	2015–16	A-League	16	4	2	0	—		18	4
Melbourne City	Total		42	7	2	0	—		44	7
Jeonbuk Hyundai Motors	2016	K League Classic	2	0	0	0	4	0	6	0
Al Kharaitiyat	2016–17	Qatar Stars League	9	0	0	0	—		9	0
Bengaluru FC	2017–18	Indian Super League	18	3	4	0	11 (Note: Appearances in AFC Cup)	3	33	6
Bengaluru FC	2018–19	Indian Super League	14	2	0	0	0	0	14	2
Bengaluru FC	2019–20	Indian Super League	17	2	0	0	4	0	21	2
Bengaluru FC	2020–21	Indian Super League	18	2	0	0	1	0	19	2
Bengaluru FC	Total		67	9	4	0	16	3	87	12
Career total			345	43	14	1	26	3	385	47

== Honours ==
=== Club ===
Gretna

- Scottish Football League First Division: 2006–07

Brisbane Roar

- A-League Championship: 2010–11, 2011–12
- A-League Premiership: 2010–11

Jeonbuk Hyundai Motars

- AFC Champions League: Winner 2016

Bengaluru

- Indian Super League : 2017-18 (Table Toppers)
- Indian Super League: 2018–19 (Table Toppers + Cup)
- Super Cup: 2018

=== International ===
Australia U-17

- OFC U-17 Championship: 2003

=== Individual ===
- A-League Goal of the Year: 2010–11
