= Ajay Chhetri =

Indian footballer

Personal information
- Date of birth: 1 July 1999 (age 27)
- Place of birth: Kanglatongbi, Manipur, India
- Height: 1.74 m (5 ft 8 1/2 in)
- Position: Central midfielder

Team information
- Current team: Sreenidi Deccan

Youth career
- 2016–2018: Bengaluru B

Senior career*
Years	Team	Apps	(Gls)
2018	Bengaluru B	9	(0)
2018–2024	Bengaluru	6	(0)
2020	→ Hyderabad (loan)	2	(0)
2021	→ East Bengal (loan)	5	(0)
2022–2023	→ RoundGlass Punjab (loan)	19	(1)
2023–2024	→ East Bengal (loan)	9	(1)
2024–	Sreenidi Deccan	0	(0)
- * Club domestic league appearances and goals as of 18:29, 10 April 2024 (UTC)

Ajay Chhetri (born 1 July 1999) is an Indian professional footballer who plays as a central midfielder for I-League club Sreenidi Deccan.

== Career ==
=== Youth ===
Born in Kanglatongbi, Manipur, Chhetri joined Bengaluru FC's Academy in 2016. In 2018, Chhetri was selected to join Bengaluru's B side for their I-League 2nd Division and Bangalore Super Division campaigns. In December 2018, Chhetri was part of the Bengaluru B side that won the 2018–19 Bangalore Super Division.

=== Bengaluru ===
On 18 September 2018, it was announced that Chhetri, along with four other teammates from the Bengaluru B team, had been called up to join Bengaluru's squad for the 2018–19 Indian Super League. He made his first-team debut for the club on 9 February 2019 against Chennaiyin. He came on as a 90th-minute substitute for Harmanjot Khabra as Bengaluru were defeated 2–1.

==== Hyderabad (loan) ====
On 7 January 2020, Bengaluru FC announced that Chhetri had been loaned to new Indian Super League franchise Hyderabad FC till the end of the season.

==== East Bengal (loan) ====
On 15 January 2021, East Bengal announced that they have signed Ajay Chhetri from Bengaluru on loan for the remained of the 2020–21 Indian Super League. He made his debut on 15 January 2021, as he came on as a substitute to Milan Singh at half time as East Bengal drew 1–1 against Kerala Blasters. Ajay Chhetri's third-minute goal for East Bengal FC during the 2023-24 ISL season marked a historic moment in recent derby clashes.

== Career statistics ==
=== Club ===
As of 10 April 2024

Club	Season	League			Cup		AFC		Total	
Club	Season	Division	Apps	Goals	Apps	Goals	Apps	Goals	Apps	Goals
Bengaluru B	2018–19	I-League 2nd Division	7	0	0	0	—		7	0
Bengaluru B	2019–20	I-League 2nd Division	2	0	0	0	—		2	0
Bengaluru B	Bengaluru B total		9	0	0	0	0	0	9	0
Bengaluru	2018–19	Indian Super League	2	0	0	0	—		2	0
Bengaluru	2019–20	Indian Super League	0	0	2 (Note: Appearance(s) in Durand Cup)	1	—		2	1
Bengaluru	2020–21	Indian Super League	0	0	0	0	—		0	0
Bengaluru	2021–22	Indian Super League	4	0	5	1	2 (Note: Appearance(s) in AFC Cup)	0	11	1
Bengaluru	Bengaluru total		6	0	7	2	2	1	15	2
Hyderabad (loan)	2019–20	Indian Super League	2	0	0	0	—		2	0
East Bengal (loan)	2020–21	Indian Super League	5	0	0	0	—		5	0
RoundGlass Punjab (loan)	2022–23	I-League	19	1	2 (Note: Appearance(s) in Super Cup)	0	—		21	1
East Bengal (loan)	2023–24	Indian Super League	9	1	5	0	—		14	1
Sreenidi Deccan	2024–25	I-League	0	0	0	0	—		0	0
Career total			50	2	14	2	2	0	66	4

== Honours ==
Bengaluru FC 'B'

- Bangalore Super Division: 2018–19, 2019–20

East Bengal

- Super Cup: 2024

Individual

- Bengaluru FC U-18 Player of the year: 2017
