= Dimas Delgado =

Spanish footballer

Dimas
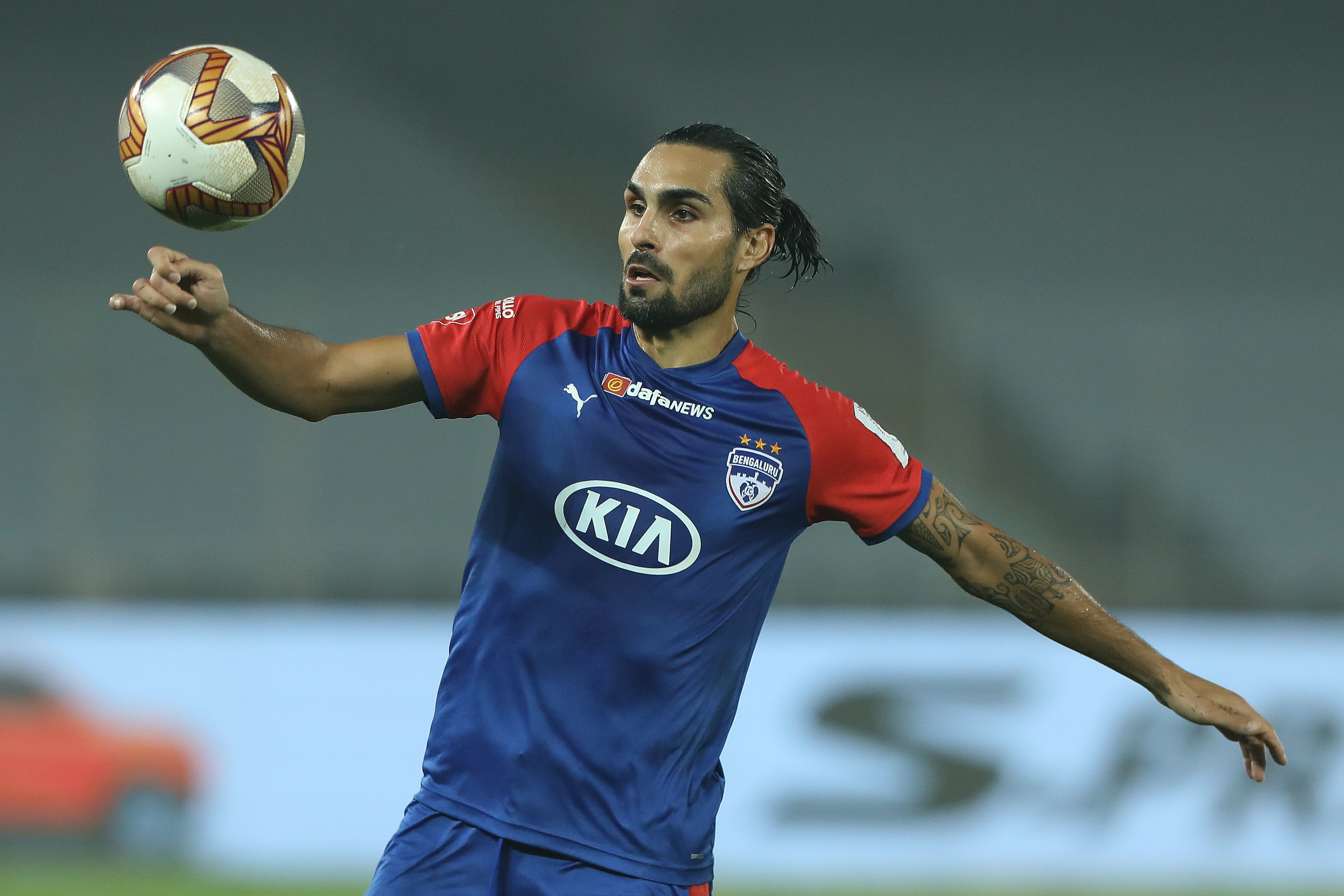
- Dimas in action for Bengaluru in 2019

Personal information
- Full name: Dimas Delgado Morgado
- Date of birth: 6 February 1983 (age 43)
- Place of birth: Santa Coloma, Spain
- Height: 1.78 m (5 ft 10 in)
- Position: Midfielder

Youth career
- Gramenet

Senior career*
Years	Team	Apps	(Gls)
2002–2004	Gramenet B	49	(8)
2002–2006	Gramenet	84	(4)
2006–2008	Barcelona B	62	(10)
2008–2011	Numancia	91	(6)
2011–2012	Cartagena	34	(1)
2012–2015	Recreativo	98	(1)
2015–2017	Western Sydney Wanderers	50	(3)
2017–2021	Bengaluru	67	(4)
2022–2023	Montañesa	25	(2)
Total		560	(39)

Managerial career
- 2023–2025: East Bengal (assistant)
- * Club domestic league appearances and goals

Dimas Delgado Morgado (born 6 February 1983), known simply as Dimas, is a Spanish former professional footballer who played as a midfielder.

He totalled 203 Segunda División games and eight goals across six seasons, with Numancia, Cartagena and Recreativo, also appearing in La Liga with the first of those clubs. Abroad, he played in the Australian A-League and the Indian Super League.

== Club career ==
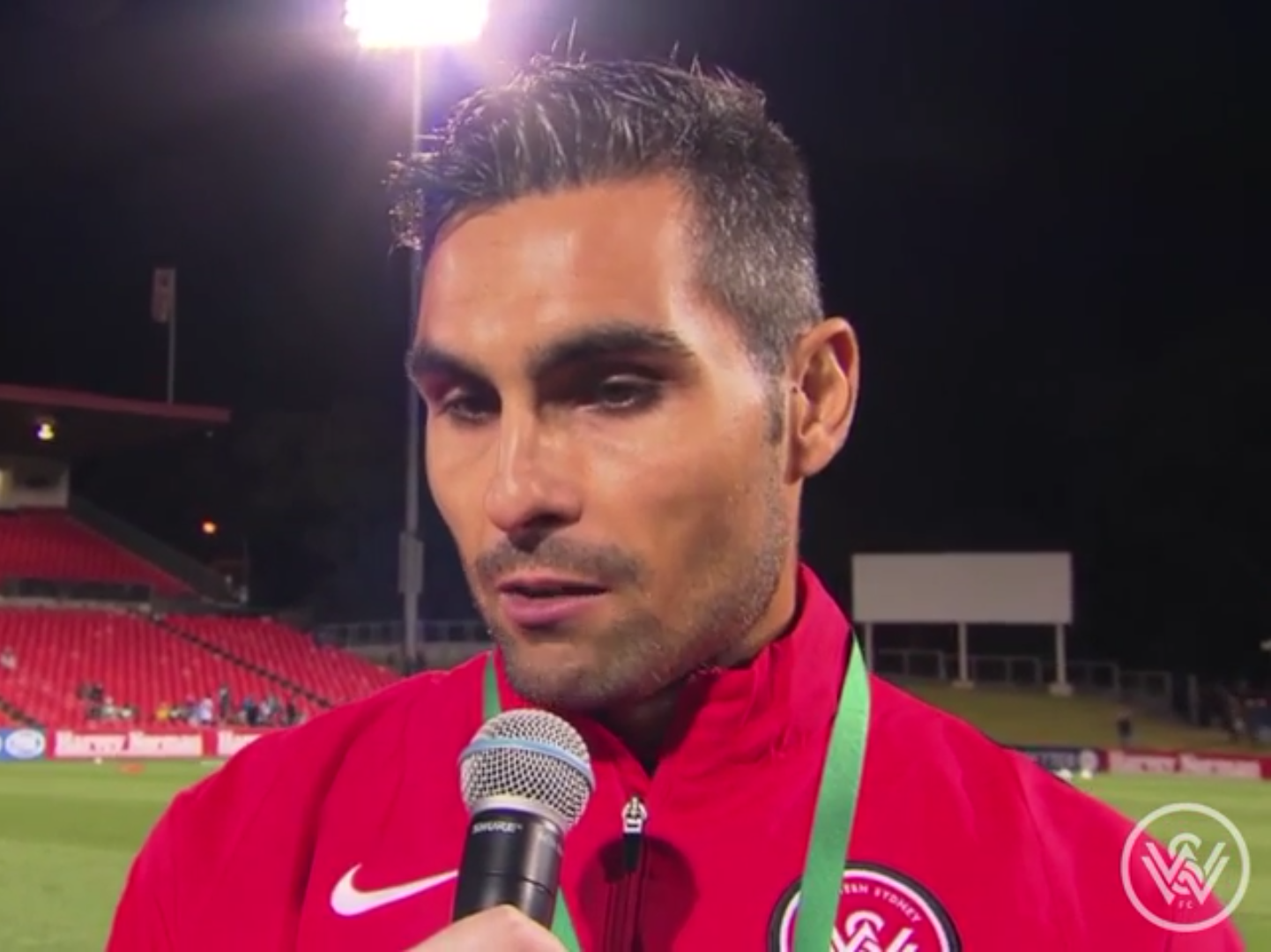
Dimas during his time at Western Sydney Wanderers

Born in Santa Coloma de Gramenet, Barcelona, Catalonia, Dimas was a product of local UDA Gramenet. In 2006, he moved to FC Barcelona's reserves, helping them to return to Segunda División B in his second season.

For the 2008–09 campaign, Dimas joined CD Numancia for his La Liga debut, which occurred on 25 September 2008 in a 2–0 away loss against RCD Mallorca. He was regularly played as the Soria club was eventually relegated after just one year.

Dimas competed in the Segunda División from 2009 to 2015, dropping down a level with FC Cartagena and Recreativo de Huelva. On 3 August 2015, aged 32, he moved abroad for the first time, signing a one-year deal with A-League side Western Sydney Wanderers FC and sharing teams with his compatriots Alberto and Andreu.

On 11 July 2017, Dimas joined Bengaluru FC on a one-year contract. After a successful debut season in the Indian Super League, he agreed to a one-year extension.

Dimas announced his retirement in May 2023 following a spell with Spanish amateurs CF Montañesa, aged 40. He returned to the Indian top tier immediately after, being appointed assistant manager at East Bengal FC.

== Career statistics ==
Club	Season	League			Cup		Continental		Other		Total	
Club	Season	Division	Apps	Goals	Apps	Goals	Apps	Goals	Apps	Goals	Apps	Goals
Gramenet	2001–02	Segunda División B	1	0	0	0	—		—		1	0
Gramenet	2002–03	Segunda División B	4	0	0	0	—		2 (Note: Appearances in Segunda División B promotion play-offs)	0	6	0
Gramenet	2003–04	Segunda División B	17	0	0	0	—		—		17	0
Gramenet	2004–05	Segunda División B	27	1	8	1	—		2 (Note: Appearances in Segunda División B relegation play-offs)	0	37	2
Gramenet	2005–06	Segunda División B	35	3	0	0	—		2	2	37	5
Gramenet	Total		84	4	8	1	—		6	2	98	7
Barcelona B	2006–07	Segunda División B	34	1	—		—		—		34	1
Numancia	2008–09	La Liga	20	2	0	0	—		—		22	0
Numancia	2009–10	Segunda División	34	3	0	0	—		—		34	3
Numancia	2010–11	Segunda División	37	3	1	0	—		—		38	3
Numancia	Total		91	6	1	0	—		—		92	6
Cartagena	2011–12	Segunda División	34	1	1	0	—		—		35	1
Recreativo	2012–13	Segunda División	37	1	0	0	—		—		37	1
Recreativo	2013–14	Segunda División	37	0	1	0	—		—		38	0
Recreativo	2014–15	Segunda División	24	0	1	0	—		—		25	0
Recreativo	Total		98	1	2	0	—		—		100	1
Western Sydney Wanderers	2015–16	A-League	26	0	2	2	—		—		28	2
Western Sydney Wanderers	2016–17	A-League	24	3	2	1	4 (Note: Appearances in AFC Champions League)	0	—		30	4
Western Sydney Wanderers	Total		50	3	4	3	4	0	—		58	6
Bengaluru	2017–18	Indian Super League	17	1	—		4 (Note: Appearances in AFC Cup)	0	—		21	1
Bengaluru	2018–19	Indian Super League	17	1	1	0	0	0	0	0	18	1
Bengaluru	2019–20	Indian Super League	20	1	0	0	0	0	0	0	17	1
Bengaluru	2020–21	Indian Super League	13	1	0	0	0	0	0	0	13	1
Bengaluru	Total		67	4	1	0	4	0	0	0	72	4
Career total			424	22	17	4	8	0	6	2	455	28

== Honours ==
Bengaluru

- Indian Super League: 2018–19
