= Soram Anganba =

Indian footballer (born 1992)

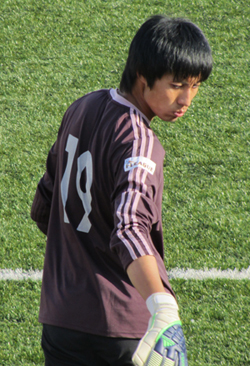

Personal information
- Full name: Soram Poirei Anganba Meitei
- Date of birth: 24 December 1992 (age 33)
- Place of birth: Imphal, Manipur, India
- Height: 1.82 m (6 ft 0 in)
- Position: Goalkeeper

Team information
- Current team: Thrissur Magic
- Number: 1

Youth career
- IFA Academy
- 2009: Pune

Senior career*
Years	Team	Apps	(Gls)
2009–2011	Pune	0	(0)
2011–2012	Shillong Lajong		
2012–2015	Pailan Arrows	18	(0)
2013–2015	→ Bengaluru (loan)	4	(0)
2015–2016	Aizawl	7	(0)
2016–2017	Delhi Dynamos	5	(0)
2017	→ DSK Shivajians (loan)	7	(0)
2017–2018	Mohun Bagan	0	(0)
2018	→ ATK (loan)	5	(0)
2018–2019	Bengaluru	1	(0)
2019–2020	NorthEast United	2	(0)
2020–2021	TRAU	8	(0)
2022–2024	NEROCA	5	(0)
2024–	Thrissur Magic		
- * Club domestic league appearances and goals as of 20:10, 11 December 2022 (UTC)

Soram Poirei Anganba Meitei (born 24 December 1992) is an Indian professional footballer who plays as a goalkeeper for Super League Kerala club Thrissur Magic.

== Early career ==
According to Soram Anganba he never was interested in football till 2002 and that it was his dad who got him into the game. In 2004 Soram played for NCC Imphal in the Subroto Cup. He was then selected into the Tata Football Academy in 2007 but could not get adjusted so he decided to move to the IFA Academy in West Bengal which is run by the Indian Football Association. He then went back to Imphal to play for Thau FC in the Manipur A-Division. He also played for the Manipur football team at the BC Roy Trophy (an under-19 tournament) in 2009 and 2010. He then joined Pune as a youth player till 2011.

== Career ==
=== Shillong Lajong ===
In the summer of 2011 Anganba signed for newly promoted I-League club Shillong Lajong. He made his professional debut for Shillong Lajong in the I-League against his former club Pune on 22 October 2011. The match ended 0–0. On 17 December 2011 Anganba was sent off for a tackle on Lalrindika Ralte against Churchill Brothers in the I-League which led to a penalty for Churchill Brothers and in the end, a 6–0 defeat for Shillong Lajong at the hands of Churchill Brothers.

=== Pailan Arrows ===
On 12 August 2012 it was announced that Soram would join fellow I-League side Pailan Arrows. He then made his debut for the club on 19 September 2012 against Dempo during the 2012 Indian Federation Cup in which he managed to keep a clean-sheet till the 60th minute when Dempo scored through Clifford Miranda; in the end Pailan drew the match 1–1. He kept his first clean-sheet in his Pailan Arrows career on 28 October 2012 against Shillong Lajong, his former club, in a match that ended 0–0. He then helped Pailan keep another clean-sheet in the next match against United Sikkim in another match that ended 0–0.

On 29 August 2013 it was confirmed that Pailan Arrows would be disbanded by the All India Football Federation after the club could not find a sponsor, thus meaning that Anganba became a free agent.

=== Bengaluru FC ===
On 13 December 2013 it was announced that Anganba had signed on loan for new direct-entry I-League side Bengaluru FC for the rest of the season. He then made his debut for Bengaluru FC on 15 December 2013 against East Bengal in which he played the whole 90 minutes but conceded two goals as Bengaluru FC fell 2–0.

=== Aizawl ===
In 2015, Anganba signed for newly promoted Aizawl FC.

== International ==
On 22 February 2012 it was announced that Anganba was selected into the initial 68-man selection for the India U23 team in preparation for the 2014 AFC U22 Asian Cup qualifiers. On 16 May 2012 he was selected as part of the 30-man squad that would participate in the preparation camp for the qualifiers. It was then confirmed that Anganba was selected into the final 23-man squad for the qualifiers but as a back-up along with Ravi Kumar to Gurpreet Singh Sandhu who was named vice-captain.

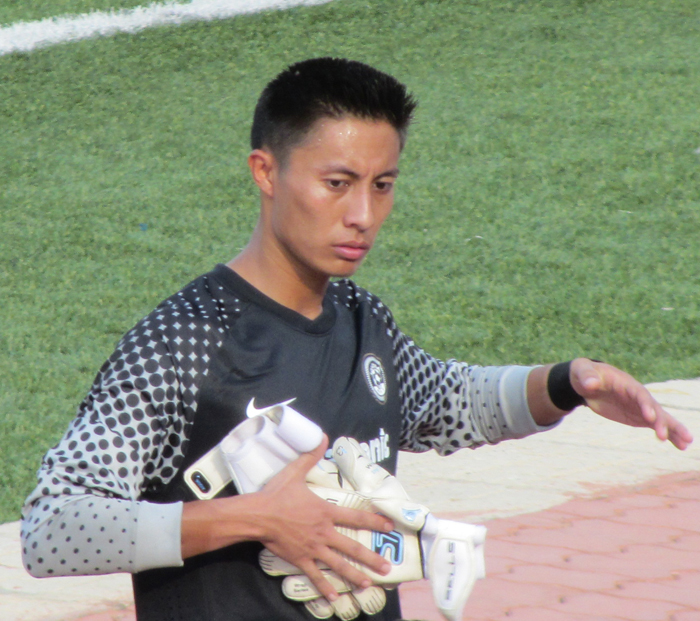
Anganba in 2012

== Career statistics ==
=== Club ===
As of 11 December 2022

Club	Season	League			Cup		AFC		Total	
Club	Season	Division	Apps	Goals	Apps	Goals	Apps	Goals	Apps	Goals
Shillong Lajong	2011–12	I-League	10	0	0	0	—		10	0
Pailan Arrows	2012–13	I-League	18	0	1 (Note: Appearance(s) in Federation Cup)	0	—		19	0
Bengaluru (loan)	2013–14	I-League	4	0	0	0	—		4	0
Bengaluru	2014–15	I-League	0	0	0	0	—		0	0
Bengaluru	Bengaluru total		4	0	0	0	0	0	4	0
Aizawl	2015–16	I-League	7	0	1	0	—		8	0
Delhi Dynamos	2016	Indian Super League	5	0	0	0	—		5	0
DSK Shivajians (loan)	2016–17	I-League	7	0	1	0	—		8	0
Mohun Bagan	2017–18	I-League	0	0	0	0	—		0	0
ATK (loan)	2017–18	Indian Super League	5	0	2 (Note: Appearance(s) in Super Cup)	0	—		7	0
Bengaluru	2018–19	Indian Super League	1	0	0	0	—		1	0
NorthEast United	2019–20	Indian Super League	2	0	0	0	—		2	0
TRAU	2020–21	I-League	8	0	0	0	—		8	0
NEROCA	2022–23	I-League	5	0	0	0	—		5	0
Career total			72	0	5	0	0	0	77	0

== Honours ==
Bengaluru

- I-League: 2015–16
- Indian Federation Cup: 2014–15
- Indian Super League: 2018–19
