= Javier Pinillos =

Spanish footballer and manager

Javi Pinillos
Personal information
- Full name: Francisco Javier Pinillos Fernández
- Date of birth: 26 October 1969 (age 57)
- Place of birth: Santander, Spain
- Height: 1.85 m (6 ft 1 in)
- Position: Goalkeeper

Youth career
- Racing Santander

Senior career*
| Years | Team | Apps | (Gls) |
| 1988–1990 | Racing B | | |
| 1990–1997 | Racing Santander | 24 | (0) |
| 1995–1996 | → Logroñés (loan) | 19 | (0) |
| 1997–1998 | Burgos | 23 | (0) |
| 1998–1999 | Jerez | 9 | (0) |
| 1999–2000 | Zamora | 36 | (0) |
| 2000–2001 | Ponferradina | 33 | (0) |
| 2001–2002 | Gimnástica | 35 | (0) |
| 2002–2007 | Bezana | | |
| Total | | 179 | (0) |

Managerial career
- 2015: Racing Santander
- 2020–2021: Bengaluru (assistant)
- 2023–: East Bengal (goalkeeper coach)
- * Club domestic league appearances and goals

Francisco Javier 'Javi' Pinillos Fernández (born 26 October 1969) is a Spanish retired footballer who played as a goalkeeper.

== Playing career ==
Born in Santander, Cantabria, Pinillos graduated from local Racing de Santander's youth setup. He made his debut with the first team in 1990, appearing in seven games as they returned to Segunda División at the first attempt.

Pinillos played his first match as a professional on 15 December 1991, starting in a 1–0 away loss against Palamós CF in the second tier. He added five appearances the following campaign, as the club achieved another promotion.

Pinillos made his La Liga debut on 19 March 1994, coming on as a first-half substitute for field player Dmitri Popov in a 1–1 home draw with FC Barcelona. Eight days later, he played the full 90 minutes in a 2–0 defeat at Real Zaragoza; during his spell, he acted as understudy to legendary José María Ceballos.

In the summer of 1995, Pinillos was loaned to second-division team CD Logroñés. He returned to Racing the following year, but was demoted to third choice and took part in no further matches.

Pinillos subsequently resumed his career in the lower leagues, representing Burgos CF, Jerez CF, Zamora CF, SD Ponferradina, Gimnástica de Torrelavega and CD Bezana, retiring with the latter in 2007.

== Coaching career ==
In 2013, Pinillos returned to his first club Racing, now as a goalkeeper coach. On 3 March 2015, after Paco Fernández's dismissal, he was appointed manager of the main squad.

Pinillos became the goalkeeper coach of Indian Super League side Bengaluru FC in July 2018. On 30 January 2020, he was named their assistant manager.
