= Nishu Kumar =

Indian footballer (born 1997)

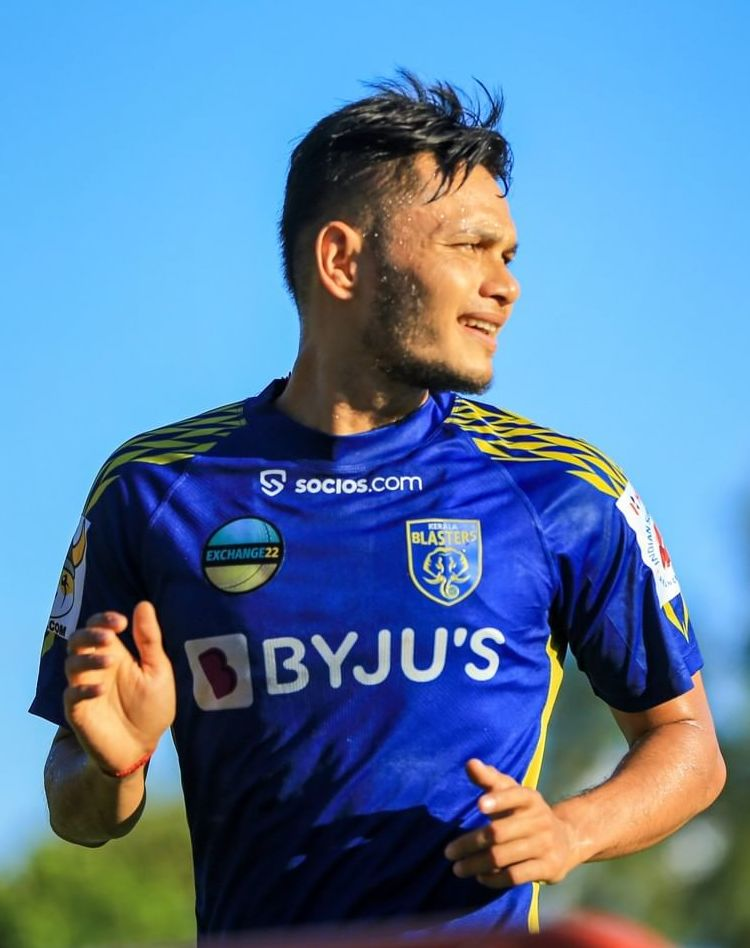
- Nishu with Kerala Blasters in 2021

Personal information
- Full name: Nishu Kumar
- Date of birth: 5 November 1997 (age 29)
- Place of birth: Muzaffarnagar, Uttar Pradesh, India
- Height: 1.71 m (5 ft 7 in)
- Position: Left-back

Team information
- Current team: Sreenidi Deccan

Youth career
- 2009–2011: Chandigarh Football Academy
- 2011–2015: AIFF Elite Academy

Senior career*
Years	Team	Apps	(Gls)
2015–2020	Bengaluru	55	(2)
2020–2024	Kerala Blasters	37	(1)
2023–2024	→ East Bengal (loan)	20	(0)
2024–2025	East Bengal	13	(0)
2025–2026	Jamshedpur	0	(0)
2026	Inter Kashi	9	(0)
2026–	Sreenidi Deccan	0	(0)

International career^{‡}
2015	India U19	8	(0)
2017	India U23	3	(0)
2018–2019	India	2	(1)
- * Club domestic league appearances and goals as of 10:44, 14 February 2026 (UTC) ‡ National team caps and goals as of 22:51, 31 November 2019 (UTC)

Nishu Kumar Tashni (born 5 November 1997) is an Indian professional footballer who plays as a defender for Indian Football League club Sreenidi Deccan.

== Club career ==
=== Youth career: 2009–2015 ===
Nishu Kumar began his career with Chandigarh Football Academy. In 2011, he was selected for AIFF Elite Academy as a part of Tata Tea & Inter Milan Soccer Stars talent hunt. He was the called up for India national under-20 football team to participate in the 2016 AFC U-19 Championship qualification.

=== Bengaluru FC: 2015–2020 ===
On 17 November 2015, Nishu Kumar was signed by Bengaluru along with two fellow AIFF Elite Academy cadets, Daniel Lalhlimpuia and Malsawmzuala, in two years deal with an option to extend for one more year. He represented the club at 2015–16 Bangalore Super Division. Nishu made his debut for the club in 2016 AFC Cup against Ayeyawady United on 13 April 2016, which Bengaluru FC won 5–3. He made his league debut against Mohun Bagan in the final game of the 2015-16 season on 23 April 2016, which Bengaluru lost the game for 5–0. Bengaluru was crowned the league champions of the seas, which helped Nishu securing his first trophy in his career. Nishu was kept for the 2016-17 I-League season. He played his first match of the season on 18 January 2017 in a 3–0 victory over Mumbai FC. Nishu played his first continental match of the season as a substitute in the 2017 AFC Cup match on 4 April in Bengaluru's 0–1 victory over Maziya S&RC. He scored his debut goal for the club in the 2017 AFC Cup match against Abahani Limited Dhaka on 18 April, which they ended up winning 2–0. He played his last league match of the season on 22 April against DSK Shivajians, which ended with a massive score of 7–0 for Bengaluru. In the following year, Bengaluru moved to Indian Super League from I-League as one of the two new entries. Nishu was kept in the squad to compete in the 2017–18 Indian Super League. Nishu played his first match of the season and in ISL overall against Delhi Dynamos (present Odisha FC) as a substitute on 26 November 2017, which ended in a 4–1 victory for Bengaluru. He played his first continental match of the season in the 2018 AFC Cup match against Transport United on 23 January 2018, which ended in a 0–0 draw. Bengaluru had a good start in their first ISL season, as they qualified for the finals of the 2017-18 Indian Super League season after defeating FC Pune City on an aggregate score of 3–1 from both legs. Nishu started as a substitute in the final match against Chennaiyin FC on 17 March 2018, but they lost the final 2–3. In May 2018, Nishu signed a two-year contract with Bengaluru till 2020. He played his first match of the 2018–19 Indian Super League on 30 September 2018 in a 1–0 victory over Chennaiyin. Nishu scored his first league goal in his career in the next match day on 7 October against Jamshedpur, which ended in a 2–2 draw. Bengaluru had a standout campaign, as they were qualified for the finals once again in the 2018–2019 season after defeating NorthEast United in an aggregate score of 4–2 from both legs. Nishu started in final against FC Goa on 17 March 2018, which they ended up being victorious by a score of 1–0, thereby Nishu clinching his first Indian Super League title and winning the emerging player of the match award in the final eve. After winning the title, Nishu played his first match of 2019–20 Indian Super League against NorthEast United on 21 October 2019, which ended 0–0 to both sides. He scored his first goal of the season in a 1–0 victory over Hyderabad on 30 January 2020. Bengaluru continued their quest in the league, as they qualified for the knockout stage for the third consecutive time, but was defeated by ATK in an aggregate score of 3–2 from both legs. In 2020 there were reports that Nishu Kumar will be leaving the club at the end of 2019–20 season. He rejected a contract extension from the club and finally decided to leave the club. Throughout his time at Bengaluru FC, Nishu made 55 league appearances and scored two goals and played a pivotal role in the success of the club over the years.

=== Kerala Blasters : 2020-Present ===
On 12 September 2020, it was officially confirmed that Nishu has finalised his move to Kerala Blasters FC, the southern rivals of his previous club. The four-year deal with the Blasters made Nishu Kumar the highest-paid Indian defender surpassing the record of Sandesh Jhingan. He made his Blasters debut on 26 November against NorthEast United FC, which ended in a 2–2 draw. In February 2021, Nishu suffered a long-term knee injury which kept him out of action for the remaining games of the season. He was also not included in club's squad for the Durand Cup, that took place in September 2021. After a period of six months, Nishu joined the Blaster's squad in the first week of October to complete the final leg of his rehabilitation. He came back to action after seven months by playing in a pre-season friendly against Odisha FC in November ahead of the 2021–22 ISL season. Nishu made his return in Indian Super League in Blasters' 0–0 draw over NorthEast United on 25 November 2021 by coming in as a substitute for Sahal Abdul Samad in the 73rd minute. He scored his debut goal for the club against Odisha on 12 January 2022, where he netted a curler into the top-right corner, in a match which they won 0–2 at full-time. After two seasons filled with injuries, Nishu made his first appearance of the season against ATK Mohun Bagan FC on 16 October 2022 as a substitute for Harmanjot Khabra in the 65th minute but the Blasters lost the match by a hefty score of 2–5. After the ISL season, he was included in the Blasters squad for the 2023 Indian Super Cup, and scored his first goal of the season against RoundGlass Punjab FC in the group-stage match on 8 April, where he scored the second goal for the Blasters as they won the match 3–1 at full-time.

== International career ==
=== Youth career ===
Nishu first represented India at the under-19 level in 2015 and had represented India U19 in the 2016 AFC U19 Championship Qualifiers in Palestine. In June 2017, Nishu was called up for the senior national team to compete in the 2019 AFC Asian Cup Qualifiers camp for a game against Kyrgyzstan. In July 2017, Nishu represented India U-23 in AFC U23 Championship Qualifiers which was held in Qatar.

=== Senior career ===
Nishu made his senior international debut against Jordan national team at King Abdullah II Stadium in Amman, Jordan on 18 November 2018, where scored his debut goal in his debut match as India's sole goal in the second half in a 2–1 loss.

Nishu was selected in the 23 men squad of India to compete in the 2022 FIFA World Cup Qualifiers. He played his second match against Oman national team on 19 November 2019 which ended in a 1–0 defeat for India.

== Career statistics ==
=== Club ===
As of matches played till 20 April 2025

Club	Season	League			Cup		Other		AFC		Total	
Club	Season	Division	Apps	Goals	Apps	Goals	Apps	Goals	Apps	Goals	Apps	Goals
Bengaluru	2015–16	I-League	1	0	1	0	—		6 (Note: Appearance(s) in the AFC Cup)	0	8	0
Bengaluru	2016–17	I-League	9	0	4	0	—		0 (Note: Appearance(s) in the 2017 AFC Cup qualifying play-off)	0	13	0
Bengaluru	2017–18	Indian Super League	9	0	3	0	—		9	1	21	1
Bengaluru	2018–19	Indian Super League	18	1	1	0	—		12	3	31	4
Bengaluru	2019–20	Indian Super League	18	1	0	0	—		2	0	20	1
Bengaluru	Total		55	2	9	0	0	0	29	4	93	6
Bengaluru B	2017–18	I-League 2nd Division	3	0	0	0	—		—		3	0
Kerala Blasters	2020–21	Indian Super League	9	0	0	0	—		—		9	0
Kerala Blasters	2021–22	Indian Super League	11	1	0	0	—		—		11	1
Kerala Blasters	2022–23	Indian Super League	17	0	2	1	—		—		19	1
Kerala Blasters	Total		37	1	2	1	0	0	0	0	39	1
East Bengal (loan)	2023–24	Indian Super League	20	0	9 (Note: 5 appearances in the Durand Cup and 4 appearances in the Super Cup)	0	8 (Note: Appearance(s) in Calcutta Football League)	1	—		30	1
East Bengal	2024–25	Indian Super League	13	0	1	0	—		1 (Note: Appearance(s) in AFC Challenge League)	0	15	0
Jamshedpur	2025–26	Indian Super League	0	0	0	0	0	0	—		0	0
Inter Kashi	2025–26	Indian Super League										
Career total			128	3	21	1	8	1	30	4	180	9

=== International ===
Statistics accurate as of 1 February 2021

India national team
Year	Apps	Goals
2018	1	1

=== International goals ===
Scores and results list India's goal tally first.

No.	Date	Venue	Opponent	Score	Result	Competition
1.	17 November 2018	King Abdullah II Stadium, Amman, Jordan	Jordan	1–2	1–2	Friendly

== Honours ==
=== Club ===
Bengaluru FC

- I-League: 2015–16
- Super Cup: 2018
- Indian Super League: 2018–19
- AFC Cup runner up: 2017
- Indian Super League runner up: 2017–18

Kerala Blasters FC

- Indian Super League runner up: 2021–22.
