= Kean Lewis =

Indian footballer (born 1992)

Personal information
- Full name: Kean Lewis
- Date of birth: 19 September 1992 (age 34)
- Place of birth: Thane, Maharashtra, India
- Height: 1.70 m (5 ft 7 in)
- Positions: Midfielder; winger

Team information
- Current team: MYJ–GMSC
- Number: 33

Youth career
- 2006: PIFA
- 2006–2008: Mahindra United
- 2008–2010: TFA
- 2010–2013: Fairleigh Dickinson Knights
- 2014–2015: Houston Dynamo U23

Senior career*
Years	Team	Apps	(Gls)
2015	Inter Acapulco		
2015	Laredo Heat	4	(0)
2015–2017	Mohun Bagan	7	(0)
2016	→ Delhi Dynamos (loan)	14	(4)
2017–2018	Pune City		
2018–2020	Bengaluru	20	(0)
2020–2021	Sudeva Delhi	14	(3)
2021–2022	RoundGlass Punjab	13	(0)
2022–2023	Mohammedan	22	(3)
2023–2025	Sreenidi Deccan		
2025	Kannur Warriors		
2026–	MYJ–GMSC		
- * Club domestic league appearances and goals

Kean Lewis (born 19 September 1992) is an Indian professional footballer who plays as a winger.

== Club career ==
=== Early career ===
Born in Thane, Lewis began his career with PIFA. At the age of 14 he was invited to Leicester City for a trial with their academy. before joining the youth side of Mahindra United and then Tata Football Academy in 2008. In 2010, Lewis moved to the United States where he played for the Fairleigh Dickinson Knights while completing his education.

After graduating, Lewis moved to Houston, Texas, where he joined the under-23 side of Houston Dynamo. In 2015, he joined Mexican club Inter Acapulco and spent a month. After moving back to the US, he signed a spell with the Laredo Heat of Premier Development League.

=== Mohun Bagan ===
In July 2015, Lewis trialled with Mohun Bagan, the reigning I-League champions. before signing with Bagan. Initially appearing in the Calcutta Football League, the state league, Lewis made his professional debut for Bagan on 9 January 2016 against Aizawl, starting the match and playing 90 minutes as his team won 3–1. He was awarded Man of the Match in his second game against Bengaluru FC, who then go on to become champions during the season.

=== Delhi Dynamos ===
Kean went on to play for Delhi Dynamos on Loan. He flourished under the guidance of Head Coach Gianlucca Zambrotta, scoring 4 goals and 2 assist. He was the 2nd highest Indian goal scorer and played all the games in the ISL 3 season, helping the team to reach the semis where they bowed out to Kerala Blasters in Penalty shootout.

=== FC Pune City ===
Post his stunning season in the previous ISL and AFC, Kean was picked by FC Pune City from the draft in the 4th edition of the ISL. His stint at the club wasn't great due to his injury in pre season. Although recovered and fit for the season, he played only 7 games even though the team reached the semis.

=== Bengaluru ===
Post his unsuccessful season at Pune City, Bengaluru FC picked him up on a 1-year deal. He was part of the ISL winning squad that season in 2018–19, recording appearances in 17 games. The Blue went on to extend his contract for another season where he played all the AFC games and a few ISL games as well, taking the blues to the semis once again.

=== Sudeva Delhi ===
On 9 October 2020, Kean Lewis joined I-League side Sudeva Delhi FC for the 2020–21 I-League season. He made his debut for Sudeva Delhi against Mohammedan SC on 9 January 2021. Kean Lewis scored his first goal for the club in the match against Indian Arrows and the club registered their first I-league victory.

== Career statistics ==
=== Club ===
As of 5 April 2023

Club	Season	League			Cup		AFC		Total	
Club	Season	Division	Apps	Goals	Apps	Goals	Apps	Goals	Apps	Goals
Mohun Bagan	2015–16	I-League	7	0	0	0	4 (Note: Appearance(s) in AFC Champions League) (Note: Appearance(s) in AFC Cup)	0	11	0
Delhi Dynamos (loan)	2016	Indian Super League	14	4	0	0	—		14	4
Mohun Bagan	2016–17	I-League	7	0	2 (Note: Appearance(s) in Super Cup)	0	5	2	14	2
Pune City	2017–18	Indian Super League	7	0	0	0	—		7	0
Bengaluru	2018–19	Indian Super League	17	0	0	0	2	0	17	0
Bengaluru	2019–20	Indian Super League	5	0	0	0	4	0	9	0
Bengaluru	Bengaluru total		22	0	0	0	6	0	28	0
Sudeva Delhi	2020–21	I-League	14	3	0	0	—		14	3
RoundGlass Punjab	2021–22	I-League	13	0	0	0	—		13	0
Mohammedan	2022–23	I-League	22	3	5 (Note: Appearance(s) in Durand Cup)	0	—		27	3
Sreenidi Deccan	2023–24	I-League	10	0	2	1	—		0	0
Career total			116	10	9	1	15	2	128	12

== Honours ==
Bengaluru

- Indian Super League: 2018–19

Mohammedan Sporting

- CFL Premier Division A: 2022

== See also ==
- List of Indian football players in foreign leagues
