= Albert Serrán =

Spanish footballer

Personal information
- Full name: Albert Serrán Polo
- Date of birth: 17 July 1984 (age 42)
- Place of birth: Barcelona, Spain
- Height: 1.83 m (6 ft 0 in)
- Position: Defender

Team information
- Current team: Montañesa

Youth career
- Espanyol

Senior career*
| Years | Team | Apps | (Gls) |
| 2002–2008 | Espanyol B | 90 | (2) |
| 2005 | → Cartagena (loan) | 4 | (0) |
| 2007–2008 | Espanyol | 3 | (0) |
| 2008–2011 | Swansea City | 30 | (0) |
| 2011–2013 | AEK Larnaca | 32 | (1) |
| 2013–2014 | Alcorcón | 14 | (0) |
| 2014–2015 | Anorthosis | 12 | (1) |
| 2015–2016 | AEK Larnaca | 12 | (0) |
| 2016–2017 | Doxa | 25 | (2) |
| 2017 | Kukësi | 0 | (0) |
| 2017 | Chabab Rif | | |
| 2018–2020 | Bengaluru | 34 | (1) |
| 2020– | Montañesa | 1 | (0) |
- * Club domestic league appearances and goals as of 15 November 2020

Albert Serrán Polo (born 17 July 1984) is a Spanish professional footballer who plays as a defender for CF Montañesa. He can occupy all three defensive positions.

== Club career ==
Born in Barcelona, Catalonia, Serrán was a product of RCD Espanyol's youth system. He appeared in three La Liga games with the team, his debut coming on 11 March 2007 in a 1–1 away draw against Racing de Santander; during his tenure at the Estadi Cornellà-El Prat, however, he was mainly registered with the B-side.

Deemed surplus to requirements following Tintín Márquez's appointment to the managerial post at the Estadi Olímpic Lluís Companys, Serrán signed a three-year contract with Swansea City in the Football League Championship, with teammate Jordi Gómez also making the move on a loan deal. The link contained a buy-back clause that allowed Espanyol to re-sign the player at a later date, but it was later revealed that such clause did not exist; however, the Pericos retained the first option should the Welsh club wish to sell in future.

Serrán was released by Swansea at the end of the 2010–11 season, which ended in Premier League promotion. He joined AEK Larnaca FC in Cyprus shortly after, having already reached an agreement with the team in May.

After five years abroad, Serrán returned to Spain and signed for AD Alcorcón in Segunda División. Subsequently, he moved back to the Cypriot First Division, first with Anorthosis Famagusta FC then former club AEK.

Serrán began negotiations with Albanian Superliga champions FK Kukësi on 17 June 2017. He was presented three days later as a replacement for Albi Alla, penning a one-year deal with an option of a further one worth €60,000 which made him one of the highest-paid players in Albanian football history. His contract also included a clause in which the club would find a school for his six-year-old daughter, and he spoke of the "dream of playing in the UEFA Champions League" during his presentation; on 20 July, however, he was released by mutual consent alleging personal problems.

In September 2017, 33-year-old Serrán signed with Moroccan club Chabab Rif Al Hoceima. On 31 August of the following year, he joined Indian Super League's Bengaluru FC on a one-year contract.

== Club statistics ==
As of 1 March 2020

Appearances and goals by club, season and competition
| Club | Season | League | | | Cup | | Other | | Total | |
| Club | Season | Division | Apps | Goals | Apps | Goals | Apps | Goals | Apps | Goals |
|---|---|---|---|---|---|---|---|---|---|---|
| Espanyol B | 2001–02 | Segunda División B | 1 | 0 | — | | — | | 1 | 0 |
| Espanyol B | 2002–03 | Segunda División B | 4 | 0 | — | | — | | 4 | 0 |
| Espanyol B | 2003–04 | Segunda División B | 16 | 1 | — | | — | | 16 | 1 |
| Espanyol B | 2004–05 | Segunda División B | 22 | 1 | — | | — | | 22 | 1 |
| Espanyol B | 2006–07 | Segunda División B | 25 | 0 | — | | — | | 25 | 0 |
| Espanyol B | 2007–08 | Segunda División B | 22 | 0 | — | | — | | 22 | 0 |
| Espanyol B | Total | | 90 | 2 | — | | — | | 90 | 2 |
| Cartagena (loan) | 2005–06 | Segunda División B | 4 | 0 | 0 | 0 | — | | 4 | 0 |
| Espanyol | 2006–07 | La Liga | 2 | 0 | 0 | 0 | — | | 2 | 0 |
| Espanyol | 2007–08 | La Liga | 1 | 0 | 1 | 0 | — | | 2 | 0 |
| Espanyol | Total | | 3 | 0 | 1 | 0 | — | | 4 | 0 |
| Swansea City | 2008–09 | Championship | 13 | 0 | 5 | 0 | — | | 18 | 0 |
| Swansea City | 2009–10 | Championship | 6 | 0 | 1 | 0 | — | | 7 | 0 |
| Swansea City | 2010–11 | Championship | 11 | 0 | 5 | 0 | 1 (Note: Appearance in Promotion Play-offs) | 0 | 17 | 0 |
| Swansea City | Total | | 30 | 0 | 11 | 0 | 1 | 0 | 42 | 0 |
| AEK Larnaca | 2011–12 | Cypriot First Division | 13 | 0 | 6 | 1 | 4 (Note: Appearances in UEFA Europa League) | 0 | 23 | 1 |
| AEK Larnaca | 2012–13 | Cypriot First Division | 19 | 1 | 5 | 0 | — | | 24 | 1 |
| AEK Larnaca | Total | | 32 | 1 | 11 | 1 | 4 | 0 | 47 | 2 |
| Alcorcón | 2013–14 | Segunda División | 14 | 0 | 2 | 0 | — | | 16 | 0 |
| Anorthosis | 2014–15 | Cypriot First Division | 12 | 1 | 2 | 0 | — | | 14 | 1 |
| AEK Larnaca | 2015–16 | Cypriot First Division | 12 | 0 | 0 | 0 | — | | 12 | 0 |
| Doxa | 2016–17 | Cypriot First Division | 25 | 2 | 3 | 0 | — | | 28 | 2 |
| Kukësi | 2017–18 | Albanian Superliga | 0 | 0 | 0 | 0 | 2 (Note: Appearances in UEFA Champions League) | 0 | 2 | 0 |
| Bengaluru | 2018–19 | Indian Super League | 17 | 0 | 0 | 0 | — | | 17 | 0 |
| Bengaluru | 2019–20 | Indian Super League | 17 | 1 | 0 | 0 | — | | 7 | 1 |
| Bengaluru | Total | | 34 | 1 | 0 | 0 | — | | 24 | 1 |
| Career total | | | 229 | 7 | 30 | 1 | 7 | 0 | 266 | 8 |

== Honours ==
Swansea City

- Football League Championship play-offs: 2011

Bengaluru

- Indian Super League: 2018–19
