= Luisma (footballer, born 1989) =

Spanish footballer

Personal information
- Full name: Luis Manuel Villa López
- Date of birth: 11 August 1989 (age 37)
- Place of birth: Noja, Spain
- Height: 1.79 m (5 ft 10 in)
- Position: Midfielder

Youth career
- Noja
- Racing Santander

Senior career*
Years	Team	Apps	(Gls)
2007–2010	Racing B	60	(10)
2007–2010	Racing Santander	3	(0)
2010–2011	Real Unión	18	(1)
2011–2012	Alavés	11	(1)
2012	Amorebieta	15	(2)
2012–2013	Noja	28	(3)
2013–2015	Barnet	61	(17)
2015–2018	Arenas	81	(19)
2018	Ponferradina	8	(0)
2019	Bengaluru	4	(0)
2020	Sestao	3	(0)
2020–2021	Gernika	12	(0)
2021–2024	Leioa	89	(29)
Total		393	(82)
- * Club domestic league appearances and goals

Luis Manuel Villa López (born 11 August 1989), commonly known as Luisma, is a Spanish former footballer who played as a midfielder.

== Club career ==
Born in Noja, Cantabria, Luisma came through the youth system at Racing de Santander. He was mainly registered with the B team during his three-year spell with the club, appearing in three La Liga matches as a substitute in three different seasons; his debut in the competition came on 1 September 2007, when he played five minutes after replacing Gonzalo Colsa in a 1–1 away draw against Real Zaragoza.

Released in 2010, Luisma took his game to Segunda División B, where he represented in quick succession Real Unión, Deportivo Alavés, SD Amorebieta and SD Noja. He reached the promotion playoffs to Segunda División with the first and third sides, but consecutively fell short.

In late July 2013, Luisma went on trial at Barnet in the Conference Premier alongside compatriot Roberto Casabella. Both players had their signings confirmed on 3 August, and the former's first goal came on 2 November 2013 when he scored the game's only in a home win over Kidderminster Harriers, being also later sent off for two bookable offences.

Across his two seasons at Barnet, Luisma scored 17 goals in 67 games in all competitions. In his second season, he finished as the team's second top scorer and helped them win promotion to The Football League as champions. On 2 July 2015, he left by mutual consent as he wanted to move back to Spain, writing a farewell letter to fans on his departure.

Luisma joined Arenas Club de Getxo on 15 July 2015. After three seasons, he then had a short spell with SD Ponferradina also of the third tier.

In January 2019, Luisma signed with Indian Super League club Bengaluru FC until the end of the season. He returned to Spain one year later, agreeing to a deal at amateurs Sestao River Club.

Luisma continued competing in the Spanish lower leagues until his retirement, with Gernika Club and SD Leioa.

== Career statistics ==
As of match played on 30 April 2022

Club	Season	League			Cup		Other		Total	
Club	Season	Division	Apps	Goals	Apps	Goals	Apps	Goals	Apps	Goals
Racing B	2008–09	Segunda División B	34	5	—		—		34	5
Racing B	2009–10	Segunda División B	26	5	—		—		26	5
Racing B	Total		60	10	—		—		60	10
Racing Santander	2007–08	La Liga	1	0	0	0	—		1	0
Racing Santander	2008–09	La Liga	1	0	0	0	—		1	0
Racing Santander	2009–10	La Liga	1	0	0	0	—		1	0
Racing Santander	Total		3	0	0	0	—		3	0
Real Unión	2010–11	Segunda División B	18	1	4	1	1 (Note: Appearance in Segunda División B promotion play-offs)	0	23	2
Alavés	2011–12	Segunda División B	11	1	2	0	—		13	1
Amorebieta	2011–12	Segunda División B	15	2	0	0	1	0	16	2
Noja	2012–13	Segunda División B	28	3	3	0	—		31	3
Barnet	2013–14	Conference Premier	28	4	1	0	2 (Note: Appearances in FA Trophy)	0	31	4
Barnet	2014–15	Conference Premier	33	13	3	1	0	0	36	14
Barnet	Total		61	17	4	1	2	0	67	18
Arenas	2015–16	Segunda División B	30	5	0	0	—		30	5
Arenas	2016–17	Segunda División B	17	5	0	0	—		17	5
Arenas	2017–18	Segunda División B	34	9	0	0	—		34	9
Arenas	Total		81	19	0	0	—		81	19
Ponferradina	2018–19	Segunda División B	8	0	0	0	—		8	0
Bengaluru	2018–19	Indian Super League	4	0	0	0	2 (Note: Appearances in Indian Super League playoffs)	0	6	0
Sestao	2019–20	Tercera División	3	0	0	0	1 (Note: Appearance in Tercera División promotion play-offs)	0	4	0
Gernika	2020–21	Tercera División	12	0	0	0	0	0	12	0
Leioa	2021–22	Tercera División	28	10	1	0	0	0	29	10
Career total			332	63	14	2	7	0	353	65

== Honours ==
Barnet

- Conference Premier: 2014–15

Bengaluru

- Indian Super League: 2018–19
