= 2016–17 Bengaluru FC season =

2016–17 season of Bengaluru FC

Bengaluru
2016–17 season
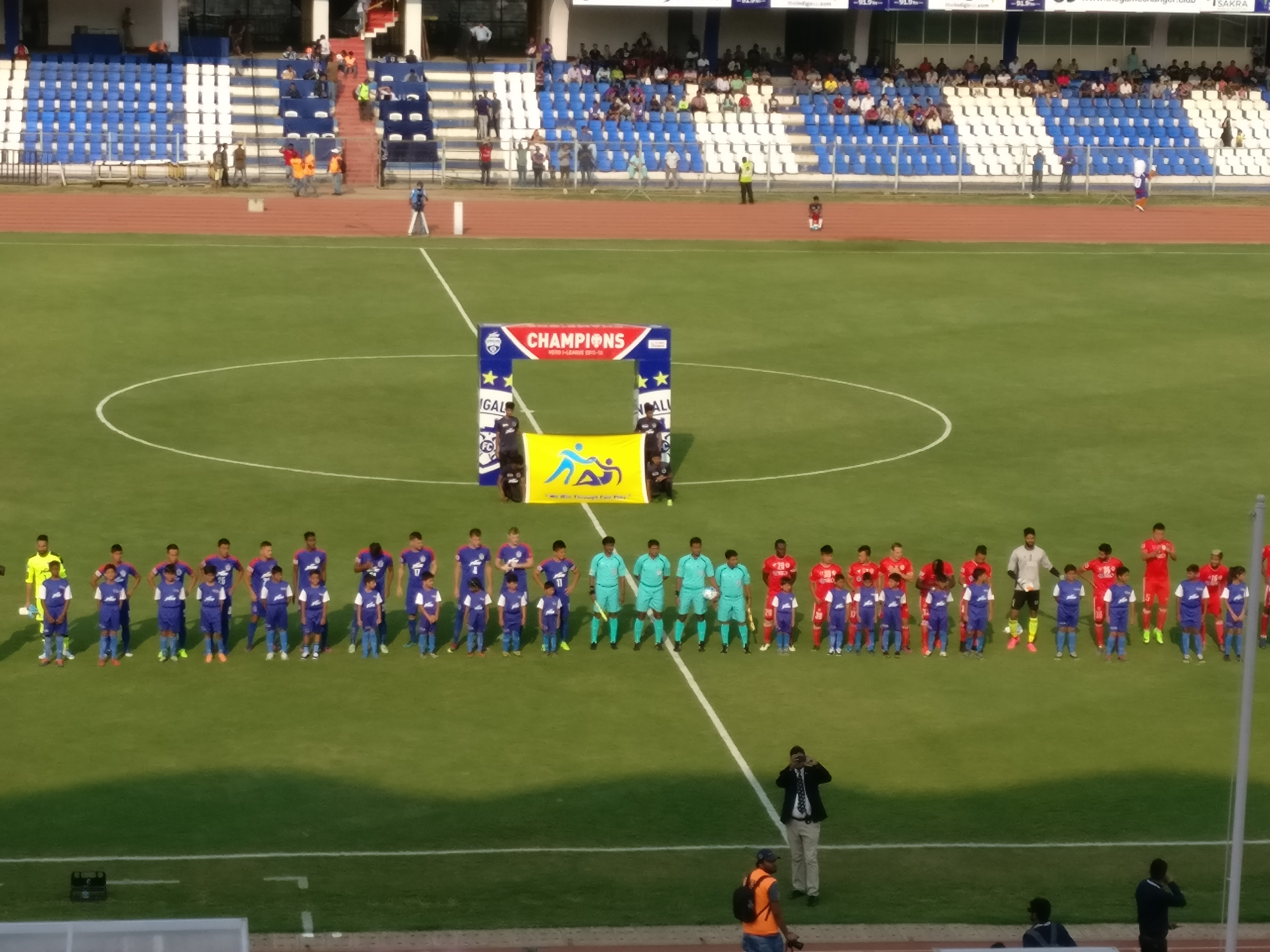
- Bengaluru FC vs Aizawl at Sree Kanteerava.
- CEO: Parth Jindal
- Head Coach: Albert Roca
- Stadium: Sree Kanteerava Stadium
- I-League: 4th
- Federation Cup: Winners
- AFC Cup: 2016: Runners-up; 2017: Inter-zone Play-off (Note: Bengaluru FC advanced to the inter-zone play-off semi-finals, played during 2017–18 season)
- AFC Champions League: Preliminary Round 2
- Top goalscorer: League: C.K. Vineeth; Sunil Chhetri (7 goals each); All: Sunil Chhetri (12 goals)
- Highest home attendance: 12,642 vs. East Bengal (25 February 2017)
- Lowest home attendance: 2,012 vs. Abahani Limited Dhaka (18 April 2017)
- Average home league attendance: 8,752
Home colours	Away colours	Third colours

The 2016–17 season was the fourth in the history of Bengaluru Football Club. It began on 1 July 2016 and concluded on 30 June 2017, with competitive matches occurring between September and May. The season was a historic one for the club as they became the first Indian club to reach the final of the AFC Cup – suffering defeat against Al-Quwa Al-Jawiya. The club also won their second Federation Cup, while in the league, Bengaluru ended their final I-League campaign in fourth place.

This season would be Bengaluru's first with head coach Albert Roca, who stepped in for Ashley Westwood. Coming into the season, Bengaluru were the reigning I-League champions and in the quarter-finals of the AFC Cup for the first time in their history. The season would see the departures of original players such as Curtis Osano, N.S. Manju, Thoi Singh, and Siam Hanghal, as well as foreign recruits Michael Collins and Kim Song-yong. Players such as Cameron Watson, Juanan, Álvaro Rubio, and Marjan Jugović were brought in as replacements. Club captain Sunil Chhetri meanwhile returned to the club on a permanent basis, along with goalkeeper Amrinder Singh.

Since the I-League did not start until January, Bengaluru began their season in September in the AFC Cup. The club managed to get past Tampines Rovers before defeating Johor Darul Ta'zim in the semi-finals. In the final against Al-Quwa Al-Jawiya the club were defeated 1–0. In the league, Bengaluru began strongly, taking nine points from their opening three matches, conceding 0 goals while scoring 8. However, the club then went on to suffer a run of seven games without a victory as Bengaluru slipped to fifth place. The club would then go on to win five of their last eight matches but it would only be enough to finish in fourth. Consolation came for the club when they went on to win their second Federation Cup. A brace from C.K. Vineeth in extra-time was enough to beat Mohun Bagan in the 2017 final.

34 different players represented the club in four competitions and there were 19 different goalscorers. Bengaluru's top goalscorer for the fourth year running was Sunil Chhetri, who scored 12 goals in 30 appearances. The India international would go on to be named as the Hero of the League. This season would be Bengaluru's last in the I-League as the club would bid successfully for a spot in the Indian Super League.

== Background ==
After narrowly missing out on the title during the 2014–15 season, Bengaluru claimed their second I-League title in three years on 17 April 2016. As a result, the club qualified to participate in the AFC Champions League qualifiers. However, in the Federation Cup, Bengaluru were unable to reclaim their title. The club were knocked-out by Aizawl in the quarter-finals. In Asian competition, Bengaluru managed to qualify for the knock-out round of the AFC Cup for the second season running with the club finishing second in Group H. The club then managed to qualify for the quarter-finals of the competition for the first time after they defeated Kitchee in the Round of 16.

A few days after Bengaluru defeated Kitchee, it was announced that head coach Ashley Westwood would leave the club. A month later, on 6 July 2016, it was announced that former El Salvador head coach Albert Roca would take over as Bengaluru's second coach. On his arrival, Roca said:

I’m very satisfied to have signed with Bengaluru FC. They are the champions of India, have fantastic supporters and most importantly, have a great support system and a management that is always hands on and wants to stay at the top. I want to assure our supporters that we will always give it our best. I want the supporters to be happy about the way we play.

=== Squad movement ===
Following the 2015–16 season, Bengaluru made a few changes to the squad. On 31 May, 2016, Curtis Osano, N.S. Manju, Thoi Singh, Siam Hanghal, Kim Song-yong, Michael Collins, and Nikhil Bernard were released by the club. Nine days later, Bengaluru confirmed that their captain, Sunil Chhetri, would be returning to the club on a permanent basis, after spending the previous season with Mumbai City. A week later, the club announced the signing of goalkeeper Amrinder Singh from Pune. Singh was previously also on loan with Bengaluru and would now join the club permanently. In August, Bengaluru announced the additions of three foreigners: midfielders Cameron Watson and Álvaro Rubio, and defender Juanan. The club then concluded the month with the signings of young defender Gursimrat Singh Gill and midfielder Darren Caldeira.

With a few of the AFC Cup matches occurring at the same time as the beginning of the Indian Super League, Bengaluru managed to secure loans for their players to various ISL clubs while retaining them until after the AFC Cup final in November.

Once the club's AFC Cup campaign had ended, Bengaluru began preparations for the I-League campaign that would begin in January. On 30 November, the club announced that Rubio, alongside Vishal Kumar and Darren Caldeira, would depart. Bengaluru then spent December bringing in players on loan from Indian Super League clubs. Defender Harmanjot Khabra was the first to be brought in from Chennaiyin on 12 December while midfielder Lenny Rodrigues soon followed from Pune City three days later. Goalkeeper Arindam Bhattacharya, defender Sena Ralte, and midfielder Mandar Rao Dessai were then all signed on 20 December from Pune City, Mumbai City, and Goa respectively. The club then ended preparations for the upcoming season with the addition of Honduran forward Roby Norales from Platense.

Almost a week after the club played their first I-League match, Bengaluru announced the signing of defender Sandesh Jhingan on loan from Kerala Blasters. Then, a few weeks later, on 2 February, after playing in just four matches, Norales was loaned out to I-League 2nd Division club Ozone. Twenty days later, the club would sign Serbian forward Marjan Jugović as Norales' replacement. Finally, after the conclusion of the I-League season and prior to the Federation Cup, Bengaluru announced the signing of forward Cornell Glen on loan from Ozone.

In

Position	Player	Last club	Date	Ref
FW	(India) Sunil Chhetri	(India) Mumbai City	9 June 2016	
GK	(India) Amrinder Singh	(India) Pune	16 June 2016	
MF	(Australia) Cameron Watson	(Australia) Newcastle Jets	5 August 2016	
DF	(Spain) Juanan	(Spain) Rayo OKC	8 August 2016	
MF	(Spain) Álvaro Rubio	(Spain) Real Valladolid	8 August 2016	
DF	(India) Gursimrat Singh Gill	(India) AIFF Elite Academy	23 August 2016	
MF	(India) Darren Caldeira	(India) Mumbai	23 August 2016	
GK	(India) Calvin Abhishek	Academy	5 November 2016	
FW	(Honduras) Roby Norales	(Honduras) Plantense	7 January 2017	
FW	(Serbia) Marjan Jugović	(Lebanon) Al-Akhaa Al-Ahli	27 February 2017	

Out

Position	Player	New club	Date	Ref
GK	(India) Nikhil Bernard	(India) Ozone	31 May 2016	
DF	(Kenya) Curtis Osano	(England) Farnborough	31 May 2016	
DF	(India) N.S. Manju	(India) Ozone	31 May 2016	
MF	(Republic of Ireland) Michael Collins	(England) Leyton Orient	31 May 2016	
MF	(India) Siam Hanghal	(India) Chennaiyin	31 May 2016	
MF	(India) Thoi Singh	(India) Chennaiyin	31 May 2016	
FW	(North Korea) Kim Song-yong	(India) DSK Shivajians	31 May 2016	
DF	(India) Vishal Kumar	(India) Minerva Punjab	30 November 2016	
MF	(Spain) Álvaro Rubio	Retired	30 November 2016	
MF	(India) Darren Caldeira	(India) Chennai City	30 November 2016	

Loans in

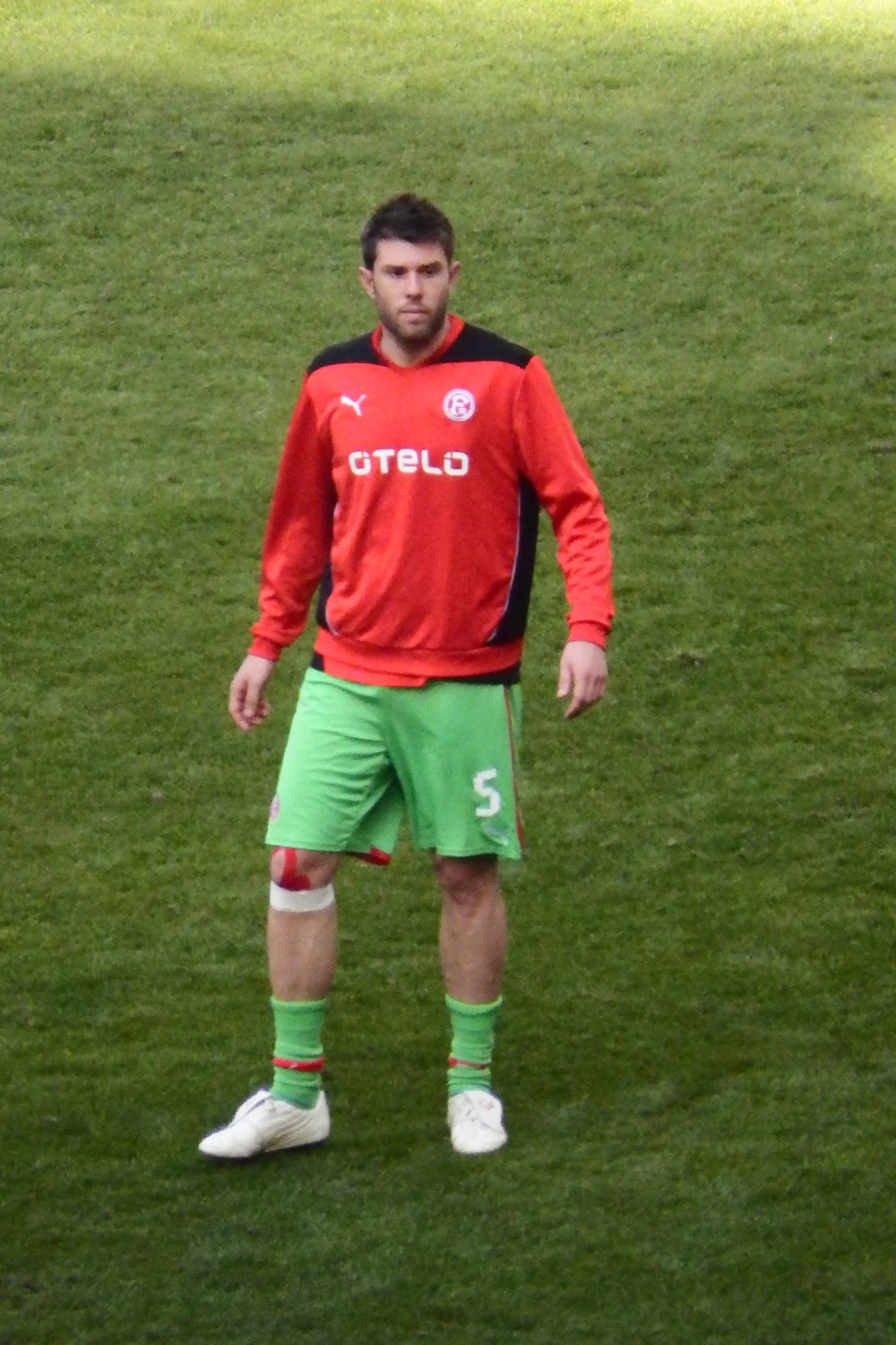
Spanish defender Juanan was signed on a one-year deal

Position	Player	Loaned from	Loan start	Ref
DF	(India) Harmanjot Khabra	(India) Chennaiyin	12 December 2016	
MF	(India) Lenny Rodrigues	(India) Pune City	15 December 2016	
GK	(India) Arindam Bhattacharya	(India) Pune City	20 December 2016	
DF	(India) Sena Ralte	(India) Mumbai City	20 December 2016	
MF	(India) Mandar Rao Dessai	(India) Goa	20 December 2016	
DF	(India) Sandesh Jhingan	(India) Kerala Blasters	12 January 2017	
FW	(Trinidad and Tobago) Cornell Glen	(India) Ozone	1 May 2017	

Loans out

Position	Player	Loaned to	From	Ref
GK	(India) Amrinder Singh	(India) Mumbai City	6 November–18 December 2016	
DF	(India) Keegan Pereira	(India) Atlético de Kolkata	6 November–18 December 2016	
DF	(India) Lalchhuanmawia	(India) Mumbai City	6 November–18 December 2016	
DF	(India) Rino Anto	(India) Kerala Blasters	6 November–18 December 2016	
DF	(India) Salam Ranjan Singh	(India) NorthEast United	6 November–18 December 2016	
MF	(India) Alwyn George	(India) Delhi Dynamos	6 November–18 December 2016	
MF	(India) C.K. Vineeth	(India) Kerala Blasters	6 November–18 December 2016	
MF	(India) Eugeneson Lyngdoh	(India) Pune City	6 November–18 December 2016	
MF	(India) Malsawmzuala	(India) Delhi Dynamos	6 November–18 December 2016	
MF	(India) Udanta Singh	(India) Mumbai City	6 November–18 December 2016	
FW	(India) Daniel Lalhlimpuia	(India) Chennaiyin	6 November–18 December 2016	
FW	(India) Sunil Chhetri	(India) Mumbai City	6 November–18 December 2016	
FW	(Honduras) Roby Norales	(India) Ozone	2 February–31 May 2017	

== Pre-season and friendlies ==
Despite the I-League not beginning until January 2017, Bengaluru FC played a series of friendlies in August in preparation of their AFC Cup matches. Their first match was on 13 August 2016 against Army Green. The club won 3–0 through a brace from Nishu Kumar and a goal from Sunil Chhetri. A week later, on 20 August, the club played another closed doors practice game against MEG and won 4–0. Daniel Lalhlimpuia scored a brace for Bengaluru FC while Chhetri and trialist Gursimrat Singh Gill scored the other two goals. Bengaluru FC suffered their first defeat of pre-season in their next match against DSK Shivajians. Juanan scored the consolation goal for Bengaluru FC as the match ended 1–2.

The club played their final match of pre-season on 28 August 2016 against Ozone FC. The result was a 1–0 defeat.

13 August 2016 Friendly	Bengaluru FC	3–0	Army Green	Bengaluru
10:00 IST	Nishu Kumar; Chhetri	Report		Stadium: Bangalore Football Stadium; Attendance: 0

20 August 2016 Friendly	Bengaluru FC	4–0	MEG	Bengaluru
10:00 IST	Lalhlimpuia; Chhetri; G. Singh	Report		Stadium: Bangalore Football Stadium; Attendance: 0

25 August 2016 Friendly	Bengaluru FC	1–2	DSK Shivajians	Bengaluru
16:00 IST	Juanan	Report	Song-Yong; Shaikh	Stadium: Bangalore Football Stadium; Attendance: 0

28 August 2016 Friendly	Bengaluru FC	0–1	Ozone	Bengaluru
10:00 IST		Report	Sathish	Stadium: Bangalore Football Stadium; Attendance: 0

== Competitions ==
=== Overview ===
Competition	First match	Last match	Starting round	Final position	Record							
Competition	First match	Last match	Starting round	Final position	Pld	W	D	L	GF	GA	GD	Win %
2016 AFC Cup	14 September 2016	5 November 2016	Quarter-final	Final	5	2	2	1	5	3	+2	40.00
Champions League	31 January 2016	–	Preliminary round-2	–	1	0	0	1	1	2	−1	0.00
I-League	7 January 2017	29 April 2017	Round-1	4th place	18	8	6	4	30	15	+15	44.44
2017 AFC Cup	14 March 2017	31 May 2017	Group stage	Qualified	6	4	0	2	7	6	+1	66.67
Federation Cup	8 May 2017	21 May 2017	Group stage	Champions	5	3	1	1	7	5	+2	60.00
Total					35	17	9	9	50	31	+19	48.57

Last updated: 31 May 2017
Source: Competitions

=== I-League ===
==== Summary ====
===== January =====
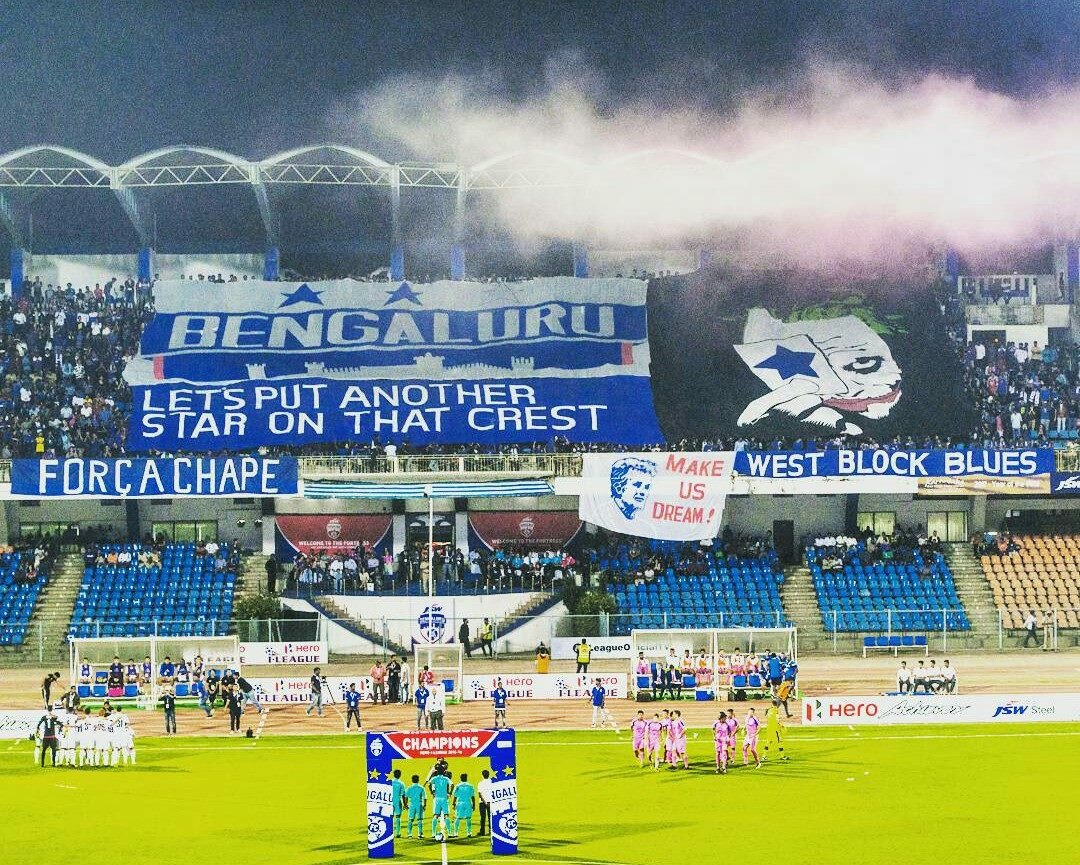
Banner unfurled before the game against Shillong Lajong

Bengaluru FC kicked off their title defense on 7 January 2017 at home against Shillong Lajong. Roca handed starts to new signings, Lenny Rodrigues, Harmanjot Khabra and Sena Ralte. Before the game, fans unfurled one of the largest tifos in Asia, measuring at 6,500 square feet. After starting tentatively, Bengaluru took a lead in 27th minute with a goal from Udanta Singh. In the second half, Udanta scored again before Sena Ralte scored his first goal for the club. Thus Bengaluru FC wrapped up a 3–0 win. Bengaluru FC played the next game against I-League debutant Chennai City. Bengaluru FC continued their attacking game, but they were thwarted by the Chennai City defense and close saves from man of the match, Karanjit Singh. However, the game turned when Roca substituted debutant Roby Norales and C.K. Vineeth in quick succession. The substitutes scored two goals in a span of three minutes and the club came out with a 2–0 win. In the final home game of the month on 18 January 2017, Bengaluru played Mumbai. C.K. Vineeth scored the first ever hat-trick for the club in any competition and Bengaluru FC won 3–0. Playing the next game against Kolkata rivals East Bengal, Bengaluru FC took a lead in 23rd minute with C.K. Vineeth's goal, but East Bengal quickly equalized through Ivan Bukenya five minutes later. In the second half, East Bengal exploited Bengaluru's vulnerable defense and finally, the substitute and former Bengaluru FC player Robin Singh scored the winner in 79th minute, thus handing Bengaluru FC their first defeat of the season. Bengaluru FC lost the subsequent away game against former champions Churchill Brothers. Sunil Chhetri opened the lead for the team, but the defense could not contain attacks from the Goan team and conceded a goal each in both the halves, losing the game 1–2. Bengaluru FC defender John Johnson was sent-off in the closing minutes.

===== February =====
Benglauru FC began February with a game against DSK Shivajians F.C. on 5 February 2017. Bengaluru looked to be heading for another defeat when DSK Shivajians were leading 2–0 in the second half with a brace from Holicharan Narzary, but a goal from Sunil Chhetri and a last gasp header from the defender Salam Ranjan Singh ensured a point for the visitors. Bengaluru's winless run continued against the debutant Minerva Punjab F.C. when in spite of taking the lead in the second half with Sunil Chhetri's goal, Sandesh Jhingan's own goal meant 1–1 draw for Bengaluru. The game extended Bengaluru FC's winless run to five games across all competitions, their worst run since team's inception in 2013. Facing Aizawl F.C. next, Bengaluru FC had to endure another draw when they had to settle for 1–1. After conceding the lead, Sunil Chhetri equalized but missed the penalty in the second half and subsequently could not find a winner. With his goal, Chhetri also became the highest Indian goal scorer in National Football League and I-League combined, surpassing Bhaichung Bhutia, who scored 89 goals. Bengaluru further failed to win against Mumbai F.C. in the away game, when they failed to break the deadlock against defensive home team. Playing the next game against table toppers East Bengal F.C., Bengaluru lost the home game 1–3 with their former player Robin Singh scoring a brace and C.K. Vineeth scoring Bengaluru FC's only goal.

===== March =====
Bengaluru FC ended their nine games winless streak on 5 March 2017 when they defeated Minerva Punjab F.C. by a solitary goal from Lenny Rodrigues in 17th minute. The blues further dropped the points playing against Chennai City F.C. when John Johnson's own goal in the second half was compensated by Daniel Lalhlimpuia, but Bengaluru failed to find the winner and had to settle for a point, in spite of being the dominant team. Before heading for the international break, Bengaluru faced Mohun Bagan A.C. Mohun Bagan were reduced to 10-men after Subhasish Bose was sent off in the second half, but Bengaluru could not find the winner and had to be content with another draw.

===== April =====
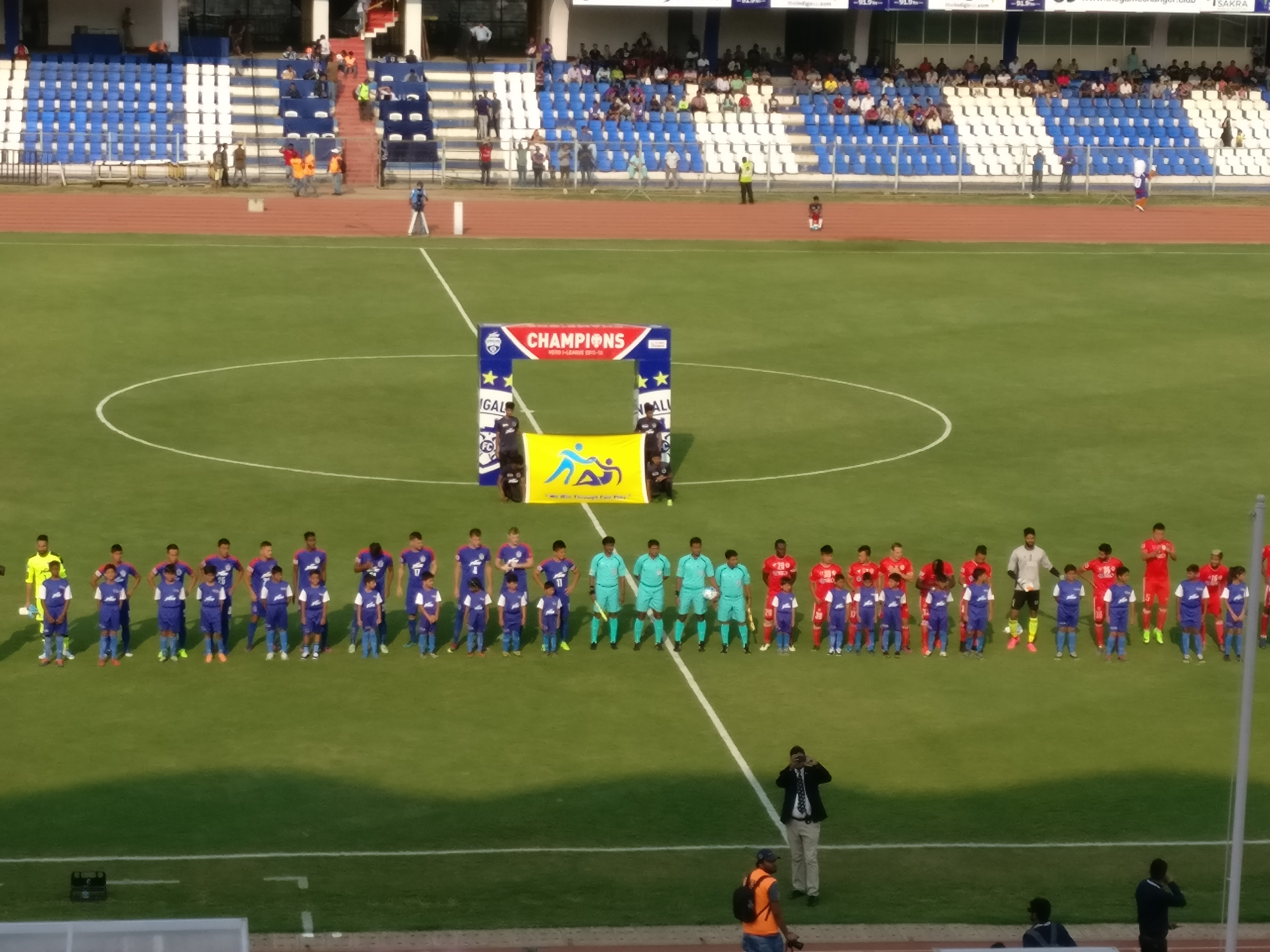
Bengaluru FC and Aizawl F.C. lining up before the kick-off

Having faced Mohun Bagan A.C. in March, Bengaluru FC faced Kolkata rivals again in the reverse fixture on 1 April 2017. Bengaluru rested Sunil Chhetri and Eugeneson Lyngdoh for the upcoming AFC fixture. With a brace from Katsumi Yusa, Mohun Bagan routed the defending champions 3–0 and officially put the title out of Bengaluru's hands. With the season approaching the end, Bengaluru FC faced the title contenders Aizawl F.C. on 9 April 2017. Aizawl led other title contender, East Bengal by 3 points at the time and a win would strengthen their position at the top of the table. However, after the hard-fought game, Bengaluru FC earned a free-kick right outside the box in the injury time. Sunil Chhetri's kick was converted by Marjan Jugović's header into the last minute goal, thus earning full 3 points for the home team. Aiming to finish the season on a high, Bengaluru FC travelled to Shillong on 15 April 2017. After insipid start, Bengaluru FC controlled the game and took the lead in 26th minute when Sunil Chhetri scored a goal. Bengaluru strengthened their lead in the second half with Harmanjot Khabra scored his first goal for the club. With the win, Bengaluru regained the fourth position in the table. In the penultimate game of the season, the blues faced DSK Shivajians F.C. at home. In a clinical display, Bengaluru scored 7 goals and maintained a clean sheet. Man of the match, Sunil Chhetri scored a brace and assisted in three goals, where as Alwyn George, Eugeneson Lyngdoh, Seminlen Doungel, C.K. Vineeth, and Sandesh Jhingan pitched in with a goal each. This was also the biggest margin of win for Bengaluru FC since their inception in 2013. The blues finished season on a high note, scoring a dominant 3–0 win against former champions, Churchill Brothers S.C. Roca rested key players ahead of AFC cup game and fielded the reserve team. Daniel Lalhlimpuia, Udanta Singh and Mandar Rao Desai scored a goal each to secure 4th position for Bengaluru FC, the lowest for the club since its inception.

==== Matches ====
7 January 2017 1	Bengaluru FC	3–0	Shillong Lajong	Bengaluru
19:05 IST	Udanta 27', 69'; Lyngdoh (yellow card) 33'; Sena Ralte 79'	Report; Report	Nongrum (yellow card) 89'	Stadium: Sree Kanteerava Stadium; Attendance: 10,106; Referee: C. R. Srikrishna; Man of the Match: Udanta Singh (Bengaluru FC)

14 January 2017 2	Bengaluru FC	2–0	Chennai City	Bengaluru
19:05 IST	Khabra (yellow card) 63'; Norales 77'; Vineeth 79'	Report; Report		Stadium: Sree Kanteerava Stadium; Attendance: 12,397; Referee: R Saha; Man of the Match: Karanjit Singh (Chennai City)

18 January 2017 3	Bengaluru FC	3–0	Mumbai	Bengaluru
19:05 IST	Johnson (yellow card) 31'; Vineeth 45+1', 57', 65'; Watson (yellow card) 73'	Report; Report	Dias (yellow card) 54'	Stadium: Sree Kanteerava Stadium; Attendance: 8,073; Referee: Santosh Kumar; Man of the Match: C.K. Vineeth (Bengaluru FC)

22 January 2017 4	East Bengal	2–1	Bengaluru FC	Kolkata
16:35 IST	Bukenya 28'; Hossain (yellow card) 31'; Ralte (yellow card) 34'; Singh 79'	Report; Report	Vineeth 23'; Chhetri (yellow card) 31'; Ralte (yellow card) 78'	Stadium: Barasat Stadium; Attendance: 10,263; Referee: Ajit Meetei; Man of the Match: Ivan Bukenya (East Bengal)

27 January 2017 5	Churchill Brothers	2–1	Bengaluru FC	Vasco da Gama
19:05 IST	Cardozo (yellow card) 21'; Wolfe 33'; C. Lyngdoh 53'	Report; Report	Chhetri 22' (pen.); Juanan (yellow card) 31'; Johnson (red card) 84'	Stadium: Tilak Maidan Stadium; Attendance: 2,341; Referee: Ranjit Bakshi; Man of the Match: Chesterpoul Lyngdoh (Churchill Brothers)

5 February 2017 7	DSK Shivajians	2–2	Bengaluru FC	Pune
19:05 IST	Kolunjia (yellow card) 14'; Narzary 41', 55'; Paul (yellow card) 76'	Report; Report	Chhetri 74'; S. Singh 90'	Stadium: Balewadi Stadium; Attendance: 1,472; Referee: Tejas Nagvenkar; Man of the Match: Holicharan Narzary (DSK Shivajians)

11 February 2017 8	Bengaluru FC	1–1	Minerva Punjab	Bengaluru
19:05 IST	Chhetri 52'	Report; Report	A. Singh (yellow card) 31'; Enyinnaya (yellow card) 45'; Jhingan 78' (o.g.); Nuruddin (yellow card) 88'; Singh (yellow card) 90+1'	Stadium: Sree Kanteerava Stadium; Attendance: 7,812; Referee: Venkatesh R Man of the Match: Sunil Chhetri (Bengaluru FC)

15 February 2017 9	Aizawl	1–1	Bengaluru FC	Aizawl
14:05 IST	Mehta (yellow card) 23'; Vanlalremdika 40'; Lalruatthara (yellow card) 53'	Report; Report	Jhingan (yellow card) 21'; Chhetri 45'	Stadium: Rajiv Gandhi Stadium; Attendance: 6,750; Referee: Rowan Arumughan; Man of the Match: Albino Gomes (Aizawl)

18 February 2017 10	Mumbai	0–0	Bengaluru FC	Mumbai
19:05 IST	D'Silva (yellow card) 66'; T. Singh (yellow card) 88'	Report; Report	Udanta (yellow card) 3'; Watson (yellow card) 30'	Stadium: Cooperage Ground; Attendance: 3,624; Referee: C.R. Srikrishna; Man of the Match: Densill Theobald (Mumbai)

25 February 2017 11	Bengaluru FC	1–3	East Bengal	Bengaluru
19:05 IST	Khabra (yellow card) 66'; Chhetri (yellow card) 69'; Vineeth 85' (yellow card) 88'	Report; Report	Wedson 23'; Singh 54', 59'	Stadium: Sree Kanteerava Stadium; Attendance: 12,642; Referee: Venkatesh R Man of the Match: Robin Singh (East Bengal)

5 March 2017 12	Minerva Punjab	0–1	Bengaluru FC	Ludhiana
16:35 IST	Kareem (yellow card) 65'	Report; Report	Rodrigues 17'; Vineeth (yellow card) 37'; Jhingan (yellow card) 47'	Stadium: Guru Nanak Stadium; Attendance: 3,175; Referee: Palmson Raj; Man of the Match: Lenny Rodrigues (Benglauru FC)

8 March 2017 13	Chennai City	1–1	Bengaluru FC	Chennai
19:05 IST	Johnson 53' (o.g.)	Report; Report	Lalhlimpuia 58'; Juanan (yellow card) 61'; Chhetri (yellow card) 90+5'	Stadium: Jawaharlal Nehru Stadium; Attendance: 1,123; Referee: Umesh Bora; Man of the Match: Daniel Lalhlimpuia (Bengaluru FC)

11 March 2017 14	Bengaluru FC	0–0	Mohun Bagan	Bengaluru
19:05 IST	Nishu (yellow card) 27'; Watson (yellow card) 90'	Report; Report	Bose (yellow card) 9' (yellow-red card) 69'; Kotal (yellow card) 90+5'	Stadium: Sree Kanteerava Stadium; Attendance: 10,124; Referee: C.R. Srikrishna; Man of the Match: Arindam Bhattacharya (Bengaluru FC)

1 April 2017 Round 6	Mohun Bagan	3–0	Bengaluru FC	Kolkata
19:05 IST	Katsumi 14', 53'; Duffy 25'	Report; Report	Khabra (yellow card) 81'	Stadium: Rabindra Sarobar Stadium; Attendance: 6,420; Referee: Santosh Kumar; Man of the Match: Katsumi Yusa (Mohun Bagan)
Note: The match originally scheduled for 1 February 2017; Postponed due to 2016 AFC Champions League and 2016 AFC Cup qualifiers.

9 April 2017 15	Bengaluru FC	1–0	Aizawl	Bengaluru
16:35 IST	Juanan (yellow card) 42'; Jugovic (yellow card) 63' (goal) 90+4'; Rodrigues (yellow card) 76'	Report; Report	Z. Ralte (yellow card) 43'; Obumneme (yellow card) 87'; Jaryan (yellow card) 90+3'	Stadium: Sree Kanteerava Stadium; Attendance: 6,834; Referee: Venkatesh R Man of the Match: Jayesh Rane (Aizawl)

15 April 2017 16	Shillong Lajong	0–2	Bengaluru FC	Shillong
14:05 IST	Tlang (yellow card) 80'	Report; Report	Chhetri 26'; Lyngdoh (yellow card) 45'; Khabra 49' (yellow card) 80'; Juanan (yellow card) 73'	Stadium: Jawaharlal Nehru Stadium; Attendance: 5,400; Referee: Tanmoy Dhar; Man of the Match: Cameron Watson (Bengaluru FC)

22 April 2017 17	Bengaluru FC	7–0	DSK Shivajians	Bengaluru
19:05 IST	Chhetri 20', 66'; George 22'; Lyngdoh 25'; Doungel 31'; Vineeth 78'; Jhingan 90'; Malsawmzuala (yellow card) 90+3'	Report; Report	Mawihmingthanga (yellow card) 40'; McFaul (yellow card) 56'; Quero (yellow card) 85'	Stadium: Sree Kanteerava Stadium; Attendance: 5,472; Referee: Tejas Nagvenkar; Man of the Match: Sunil Chhetri (Bengaluru FC)

29 April 2017 18	Bengaluru FC	3–0	Churchill Brothers	Bengaluru
19:05 IST	Lalhlimpuia 5'; Udanta 36'; Desai 82'; Jhingan (yellow card) 89'	Report; Report		Stadium: Sree Kanteerava Stadium; Attendance: 5,311; Referee: Om Prakash Thakur; Man of the Match: Mandar Rao Desai (Bengaluru FC)

==== Table ====
Pos	Team	Pld	W	D	L	GF	GA	GD	Pts	Qualification or relegation
2	Mohun Bagan	18	10	6	2	27	12	+15	36	
3	East Bengal	18	10	3	5	33	15	+18	33	
4	Bengaluru	18	8	6	4	30	15	+15	30	Qualification to AFC Cup qualifying play-off (Note: Bengaluru qualified for the 2018 AFC Cup by winning the 2016–17 Federation Cup.)
5	Shillong Lajong	18	7	5	6	24	23	+1	26	
6	Churchill Brothers	18	5	5	8	24	26	−2	20	

Source: IndiaFooty.com
Rules for classification: 1) points; 2) head-to-head points; 3) head-to-head goal difference; 4) goal difference; 5) number of goals scored; 6) drawing of lots

==== Results by round ====
Round	1	2	3	4	5	6	7	8	9	10	11	12	13	14	15	16	17	18
Ground	H	H	H	A	A	A	A	H	A	A	H	A	A	H	H	A	H	H
Result	W	W	W	L	L	L	D	D	D	D	L	W	D	D	W	W	W	W
Position	1	1	1	4	4	4	5	5	5	5	5	4	5	5	5	4	4	4

Updated to match(es) played on 29 April 2017. Source: I-League
A = Away; H = Home; W = Win; D = Draw; L = Loss

=== 2016 AFC Cup ===
In previous season, Bengaluru FC advanced to the quarter-finals of 2016 AFC Cup.

==== Quarter-finals ====
On 9 June 2016, Bengaluru FC were drawn against 2015 S.League runner-up, Tampines Rovers FC for two-legged quarter final. Owing to the ongoing disturbances in the city for Kaveri river water dispute, the first game was played behind the closed doors. Bengaluru FC won the first leg 1–0 with the goal from C.K. Vineeth in the 7th minute. In the return leg, neither team scored a goal and Bengaluru FC advanced to the semi-finals for the first time. Bengaluru became the third team from India after Dempo (2008) and East Bengal (2013) to reach the semi-finals in AFC Cup.

14 September 2016 Quarter-finals	Bengaluru FC (India)	1–0	(Singapore) Tampines Rovers	Bengaluru, India
16:00 UTC+5:30	Vineeth 7'; Johnson (yellow card) 45+1'; Nishu (yellow card) 53'	Report		Stadium: Sree Kanteerava Stadium; Attendance: 120; Referee: Ahmed Al-Kaf (Oman); MVP: C.K. Vineeth (Bengaluru FC)

21 September 2016 Quarter-finals	Tampines Rovers (Singapore)	0–0 (0–1 agg.)	(India) Bengaluru FC	Singapore
19:30 UTC+8	Webb (yellow card) 36'	Report	A. Singh (yellow card) 30'	Stadium: Jalan Besar Stadium; Attendance: 1,985; Referee: Kim Dong-jin (South Korea); MVP: Izwan Mahbud (Tampines Rovers)

==== Semi-finals ====
Bengaluru FC faced defending champions Johor Darul Ta'zim in semi finals. In the away leg, Johor took a lead with Pereyra Diaz's header in 52nd minute, Bengaluru equalized 4 minutes later with Eugeneson Lyngdoh's goal and the game ended 1–1 with a crucial away goal for Bengaluru FC.

The second leg was a big fanfare for the home team, as Bengaluru FC could be the first Indian team to advance beyond semi finals in the AFC cup. Even the traditional rival teams like Mohun Bagan, East Bengal, as well as other I-League clubs such as Shillong Lajong, Sporting Clube de Goa and Indian Super League clubs extended their support to Bengaluru FC. In the game, Johor Darul Ta'zim took the early lead in 12th minute against the run of play. Before the half time, Bengaluru restored the parity with Sunil Chhetri's header. The home team continued the dominance in the second half with Chhetri scoring a brace and Juanan scoring a header and his first goal for the team. Bengaluru advanced to the final for the first time with 4–2 aggregate.

28 September 2016 Semi-finals	Johor Darul Ta'zim (Malaysia)	1–1	(India) Bengaluru FC	Johor Bahru, Malaysia
20:45 UTC+8	Antônio (yellow card) 33'; Pereyra Diaz 52' (yellow card) 55'; Yahyah (yellow card) 76'; Lucero (yellow card) 81'	Report	S. Singh (yellow card) 45+1'; Juanan (yellow card) 55'; Lyngdoh 56'	Stadium: Larkin Stadium; Attendance: 18,000; Referee: Adham Makhadmeh (Jordan); MVP: Mohd Safiq Rahim (Johor Darul Ta'zim)

19 October 2016 Semi-finals	Bengaluru FC (India)	3–1 (4–2 agg.)	(Malaysia) Johor Darul Ta'zim	Bengaluru, India
19:00 UTC+5:30	Chhetri 41', 67'; Vineeth (yellow card) 73'; Lyngdoh (yellow card) 75'; Juanan 76'; Rubio (yellow card) 77'; A. Singh (yellow card) 90+3'	Report	Safiq 11'; António (yellow card) 25'; Robbat (yellow card) 77'	Stadium: Sree Kanteerava Stadium; Attendance: 21,379; Referee: Ali Abdulnabi (Bahrain); MVP: Sunil Chhetri (Bengaluru FC)

==== Final ====
Bengaluru FC faced Iraqi club Al-Quwa Al-Jawiya on 5 November 2016 in Doha. Bengaluru FC became the first team from India to advance to the AFC Cup Final. After holding off the attacks in the first half, Bengaluru FC committed a defensive mistake that led to the solitary goal of the game by Hammadi Ahmad and Bengaluru lost the game 1–0. In spite of the loss, Bengaluru FC's journey to the final was hailed as one of the top moments in Indian sports and Indian football. Reacting to the loss, Albert Roca said:

I think we have to look forward (about Indian football) and we must be honest. We can say these guys were here in the final because they deserved that, but not enough to win. We must not stop, we must be aware of the reality, and there's a lot to do. A lot of growing up has to be done. As I said, 'not enough'. We have to work hard and be more competitive than today. We have achieved a level that we are not used to in our league. But that's not only on us, it is important to have a more competitive league. You have to be honest about where you are right now. India has never shown an incredible level, but today we have shown that we can. This experience is perfect to accept that there's a long way to go ahead. Let's just go there. I am proud of my players because they tried.

5 November 2016 Final	Al-Quwa Al-Jawiya (Iraq)	1–0	(India) Bengaluru FC	Doha, Qatar
19:00 UTC+3	Ahmad 70'; Talib (yellow card) 90+5'	Report		Stadium: Suheim Bin Hamad Stadium; Attendance: 5,806; Referee: Kim Jong-hyeok (South Korea); MVP: Hammadi Ahmad (Al-Quwa Al-Jawiya)

=== AFC Champions League ===
The AFC Champions League is the premier continental football competition organized by the Asian Football Confederation (AFC). As the champions of the I-League the previous season, Bengaluru FC earned a chance to qualify for the tournament. India did not have a direct-entry spot in the AFC Champions League and thus the champion team from India had to qualify for the tournament through the preliminary rounds. Bengaluru FC were put up against Al-Wehdat of Jordan. Unlike previous seasons, India were put back into the Western Zone of Asia by the AFC.

During the match on 21 January 2017, Al-Wehdat started the game aggressively. Despite Al-Wehdat holding most of the momentum, the club were held goalless at halftime by Bengaluru FC. The Jordanian side however scored two goals quickly during the second half, including one from the penalty spot. Sunil Chhetri pulled one back for Bengaluru FC from a Cameron Watson corner but that proved to be just a consolation as Bengaluru FC were defeated 2–1. The defeat meant that Bengaluru FC would not compete in that season's AFC Champions League and would thus have to compete in the 2017 AFC Cup, Asia's secondary competition.

31 January 2017 PR 2	Al-Wehdat (Jordan)	2–1	(India) Bengaluru FC	Amman, Jordan
18:00 UTC+2	Wridat 48'; Faisal 65' (pen.)	Report	Ralte (yellow card) 64'; Chhetri 68'	Stadium: King Abdullah II Stadium; Attendance: 10,000; Referee: Nagor Amir Noor Mohamed (Malaysia); MVP: Juanan (Bengaluru FC)

=== 2017 AFC Cup ===
Bengaluru FC competed in Group E alongside 2016 Dhivehi Premier League champions Maziya S&RC, 2016 Bangladesh Federation Cup winners Dhaka Abahani, and 2015–16 Indian Federation Cup and South Asia play-off winner, Mohun Bagan A.C.

==== Group stage ====
Runner-up in the previous edition, Bengaluru FC started their AFC Cup against fellow I-League team, Mohun Bagan A.C. at home on 14 March 2017. Bengaluru FC were trailing in the first half when Sandesh Jhingan fouled Sony Norde inside the box and conceded a penalty, converted by Katsumi Yusa. However, Bengaluru came back strongly in the second half and scored two quick goals, by Sandesh Jhingan and Sunil Chhetri, enough to earn them three points. Facing Maziya S&RC next, Bengaluru FC had to wait till 93rd minute for John Johnson winner from Marjan Jugovic assist to win the game. Bengaluru continued their unbeaten run in the cup when they faced Dhaka Abahani at home. A goal in each half from Nishu Kumar and Marjan Jugović ensured the top place in group E at the end of the first round of fixtures.

Bengaluru FC suffered their first loss in the tournament against Dhaka Abahani in the reverse fixture, when they failed to overcome 10-men hosts and conceded two goals in the closing minutes. Bengaluru FC then faced Mohun Bagan A.C. away from home. Due to upcoming Federation Cup Final, both teams fielded their reserve teams, with Albert Roca opting for all-Indian eleven. The game ended 3–1 against the blues. Trailing the group leader Maziya S&RC by 3 points, a win would put Bengaluru FC equal on points, but ahead on head-to-head record, after the final game. Bengaluru enjoyed the lion share of possession in the first half, but could not find a goal. Ten minutes in the second half, Bengaluru were awarded a free-kick just outside the penalty box and Sunil Chhetri successfully converted it to make it 1–0 for the home team. Bengaluru held on to the lead till the end and handed the fourth defeat to Maldivian opponent in as many games. Bengaluru then played in the knock-out stage in 2017–18 season.

Pos	Team	Pld	W	D	L	GF	GA	GD	Pts	Qualification	BFC	MAZ	MOH	ABD
1	(India) Bengaluru	6	4	0	2	7	6	+1	12 (Note: Head-to-head results: Maziya 0–1 Bengaluru, Bengaluru 1–0 Maziya.)	Inter-zone play-off semi-finals	—	1–0	2–1	2–0
2	(Maldives) Maziya	6	4	0	2	10	4	+6	12		0–1	—	5–2	2–0
3	(India) Mohun Bagan	6	2	1	3	10	11	−1	7		3–1	0–1	—	3–1
4	(Bangladesh) Abahani Limited Dhaka	6	1	1	4	4	10	−6	4		2–0	0–2	1–1	—

Source: AFC
Notes:

14 March 2017	Bengaluru FC (India)	2–1	(India) Mohun Bagan	Bangalore, India
19:00 UTC+5:30	Jhingan (yellow card) 36' (goal) 51'; Chhetri 57'; Watson (yellow card) 58'; Johnson (yellow card) 69'; Khabra (yellow card) 90+2'	Report	Yusa 36' (pen.); Norde (yellow card) 74'	Stadium: Sree Kanteerava Stadium; Attendance: 3,692; Referee: Shukri Al-Hunfush (Saudi Arabia); MVP: Sunil Chhetri (Bengaluru FC)

4 April 2017	Maziya (Maldives)	0–1	(India) Bengaluru FC	Malé, Maldives
16:00 UTC+5	Niyaz (yellow card) 90+2'	Report	Jhingan (yellow card) 80'; Chhetri (yellow card) 90+2'; Johnson 90+4'	Stadium: National Football Stadium; Attendance: 846; Referee: Sultan Al-Marzooqi (United Arab Emirates); MVP: John Johnson (Bengaluru FC)

18 April 2017	Bengaluru FC (India)	2–0	(Bangladesh) Dhaka Abahani	Bangalore, India
19:00 UTC+5:30	Nishu 40'; Jugović 82'	Report	Chowdhury (yellow card) 43'	Stadium: Sree Kanteerava Stadium; Attendance: 2,012; Referee: Kasimov Sherzod (Uzbekistan); MVP: Lalthuammawia Ralte (Bengaluru FC)

3 May 2017	Dhaka Abahani (Bangladesh)	2–0	(India) Bengaluru FC	Dhaka, Bangladesh
18:10 UTC+6	Miya (yellow card) 69' (goal) 90+3'; Chowdhury (yellow card) 74' (yellow-red card) 81'; Uddin 87'	Report	Lyngdoh (yellow card) 40'; Johnson (yellow card) 52'; Khabra (yellow card) 62'; Udanta (yellow card) 84'	Stadium: Bangabandhu National Stadium; Attendance: 3,200; Referee: Hussein Abo Yehia (Lebanon); MVP: Saad Uddin (Dhaka Abahani)

17 May 2017	Mohun Bagan (India)	3–1	(India) Bengaluru FC	Kolkata, India
19:00 UTC+5:30	Lalpekhlua 9'; Lewis 74'; Bikramjit 80'	Report	Len 52'; Gill (yellow card) 87'	Stadium: Rabindra Sarobar Stadium; Attendance: 1,298; Referee: Ammar Mahfoodh (Bahrain); MVP: Jeje Lalpekhlua (Mohun Bagan)

31 May 2017	Bengaluru FC (India)	1–0	(Maldives) Maziya	Bangalore, India
19:15 UTC+5:30	Jhingan (yellow card) 38'; Chhetri 57'; Lyngdoh (yellow card) 77'; Nishu (yellow card) 81'	Report	Ali (yellow card) 62'	Stadium: Sree Kanteerava Stadium; Attendance: 3,713; Referee: Lau Fong Hei (Hong Kong)

=== Federation Cup ===
==== Group stage ====
Bengaluru FC were drawn with Mohun Bagan, Shillong Lajong, and DSK Shivajians in Group B. Bengaluru started the campaign with a 3–2 win against Shillong Lajong. Bengaluru led 1–0 at the half time with a goal from Udanta Singh. Bengaluru FC conceded two penalties, but managed to save one and total four goals were scored in the second half, but Bengaluru managed to scrape a win. In the next game against DSK Shivajians, Bengaluru started the game as the dominant team, but were unable to convert chances in the first half, DSK Shivajians however converted a penalty and a freekick in the second half to register their first win against Bengaluru FC and won the game 2–0. Bengaluru faced Mohun Bagan in the final game of the group stage. After DSK Shivajians lost to Shillong Lajong earlier in the day, Bengaluru needed a draw to advance to semi-finals. Bengaluru took the lead with Alwyn George's goal in the 11th minute, but Sony Norde equalized in the second half from 20 yards, when the defence failed to contain him. Both the teams earned a point and made it to the semi-finals.

Group B

Pos	Team	Pld	W	D	L	GF	GA	GD	Pts	Qualification
1	Mohun Bagan	3	2	1	0	8	3	+5	7	Advance to semi-finals
2	Bengaluru FC	3	1	1	1	4	5	−1	4	Advance to semi-finals
3	Shillong Lajong	3	1	0	2	7	8	−1	3	
4	DSK Shivajians	3	1	0	2	4	7	−3	3	

Source: AIFF

8 May 2017	Bengaluru FC	3–2	Shillong Lajong	Cuttack
16:00 IST	Udanta 35'; Lyngdoh 46' (yellow card) 82'; Watson (yellow card) 54'; Jhingan (yellow card) 70'; Khongjee 74' (o.g.); Ranjan (yellow card) 83'	Report	Kinowaki 72'; S.Lalmuanpuia 84' (pen.)	Stadium: Barabati Stadium; Man of the Match: Udanta Singh (Bengaluru FC)

10 May 2017	DSK Shivajians	2–0	Bengaluru FC	Cuttack
16:00 IST	Quero 71' (pen.), 76'	Report	Lyngdoh (yellow card) 58'; Udanta (yellow card) 75'	Stadium: Barabati Stadium; Man of the Match: Juan Quero (DSK Shivajians)

12 May 2017	Mohun Bagan	1–1	Bengaluru FC	Cuttack
19:00 IST	Norde 50'	Report	George 11'; Chhetri (yellow card) 38'; Doungel (yellow card) 75'	Stadium: Barabati Stadium; Man of the Match: Raju Gaikwad (Mohun Bagan)

==== Semi-finals ====
In the semi-finals, Bengaluru faced Group A winner and 2016–17 I-League champions Aizawl. Bengaluru took the lead in 8th minute when Alwyn George was fouled inside the box and Bengaluru were awarded the penalty and Cameron Watson successfully converted the penalty. Bengaluru had more scoring opportunities but could not extend their lead. Aizawl were given the penalty seconds before the final whistle, but Amrinder Singh saved Lalramchullova's shot and sent the team to the final.

14 May 2017	Aizawl	0–1	Bengaluru FC	Cuttack
16:00 IST		Report	Watson 8' (pen.) (yellow card); Vineeth (yellow card) 50'; Amrinder (yellow card) 90'	Stadium: Barabati Stadium; Referee: Rahul Gupta; Man of the Match: John Johnson (Bengaluru FC)

==== Final ====
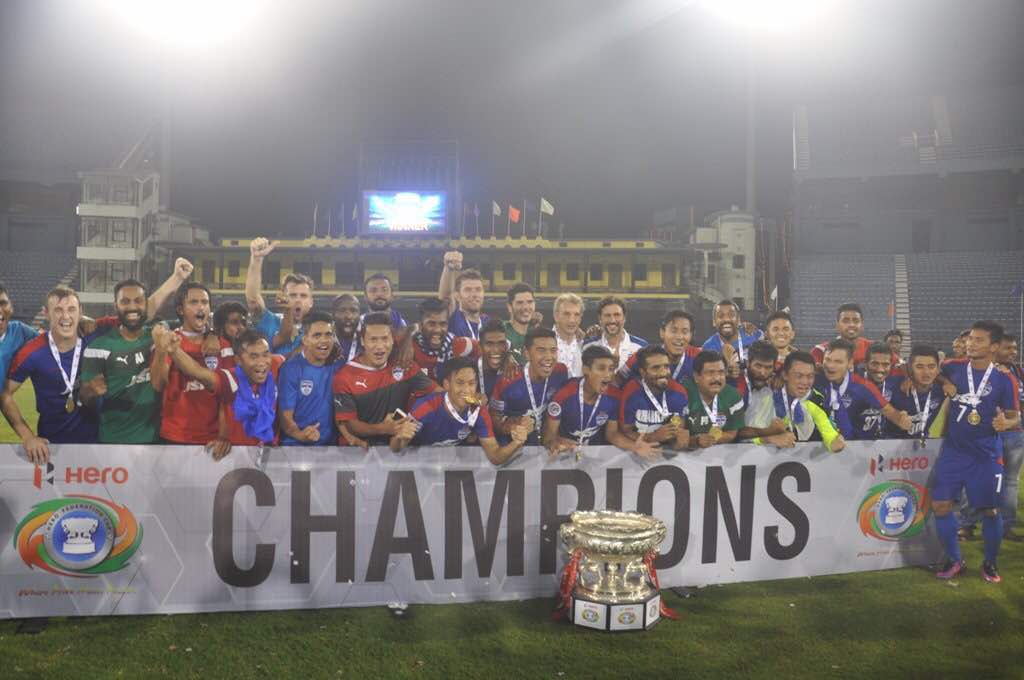
Bengaluru FC won the second Federation Cup title

Bengaluru FC played the defending champions Mohun Bagan A.C. in the final on 21 May 2017. After the injury of the captain Sunil Chhetri in the group stage, due to harsh weather conditions and cramped schedule, Bengaluru FC requested to postpone the match to 24 May, but the request was denied. Before the match, Roca remarked, "I would say Bagan are the favourites with some big names on their roster and the availability of all four foreigners for this fixture. We have no problem being the underdogs." In the match, Bengaluru created flurry of chances, but two of their goals were declared offside and neither team scored a goal in the regulation team. However, C.K. Vineeth, coming off the bench, scored two goals in the extra time and led the team to second triumph in Federation Cup. As the winner, Bengaluru FC also qualified for 2018 AFC Cup, their fourth consecutive appearance in the tournament.

21 May 2017	Bengaluru FC	2–0 (a.e.t.)	Mohun Bagan	Cuttack
19:00 IST	Khabra (yellow card) 10'; Lyngdoh (yellow card) 13'; Vineeth 107', 119'	Report	Norde (yellow card) 10'; Sehnaj (yellow card) 79'; Kotal (yellow card) 100'	Stadium: Barabati Stadium; Referee: C.R. Srikrishna; Man of the Match: Amrinder Singh (Bengaluru FC)

== Accolades ==
Sunil Chhetri won Hero of the league award for 2016–17 I-League, voted by coaches and captains of the participating teams. Bengaluru FC also won the best organizers award along with DSK Shivajians. Udanta Singh won players' player of the season as well as fans' player of the season at the annual Bengaluru FC awards, where as Nishu Kumar was adjudged most improved player of the season. C.K. Vineeth was adjudged FPAI Player of the year and Udanta Singh was awarded Young player of the year.

== Player information ==
=== Management ===
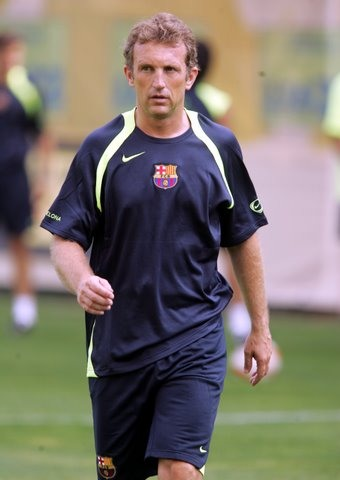
Albert Roca, Bengaluru FC's head coach for 2016–17 season

As of June 2016.

Position	Name
Head coach	(Spain) Albert Roca
Assistant coach	(Spain) Carles Cuadrat
Goalkeeping coach	(Turkey) Ali Uzunhasanoglu
Head of Youth Development	(Netherlands) John Killa
Under-18 coach	(India) John Kenneth Raj
Head physiotherapist	(South Africa) Timothy Vadachalam
Head of sports sciences	(England) Donavan Pillai

== Player statistics ==
=== Appearances and goals ===
No.	Pos	Nat	Player	Total		I-League		Federation Cup		AFC	
No.	Pos	Nat	Player	Apps	Goals	Apps	Goals	Apps	Goals	Apps	Goals
Goalkeepers
1	GK	(India) IND	Amrinder Singh	23	0	12+0	0	3+0	0	8+0	0
27	GK	(India) IND	Arindam Bhattacharya	7	0	5+1	0	0+0	0	1+0	0
28	GK	(India) IND	Lalthuammawia Ralte	6	0	1+0	0	2+0	0	3+0	0
32	GK	(India) IND	Calvin Abhishek	0	0	0+0	0	0+0	0	0+0	0
Defenders
4	DF	(Spain) ESP	Juanan	31	1	15+0	0	5+0	0	11+0	1
5	DF	(India) IND	Keegan Pereira	5	0	1+1	0	0+0	0	1+2	0
6	DF	(England) ENG	John Johnson	28	1	12+0	0	5+0	0	11+0	1
10	DF	(India) IND	Harmanjot Khabra	25	1	12+2	1	5+0	0	4+2	0
13	DF	(India) IND	Rino Anto	7	0	0+0	0	0+0	0	5+2	0
15	DF	(India) IND	Sandesh Jhingan	20	2	10+1	1	5+0	0	4+0	1
19	DF	(India) IND	Sena Ralte	8	1	6+1	1	0+0	0	1+0	0
22	DF	(India) IND	Nishu Kumar	22	1	9+0	0	2+2	0	8+1	1
23	DF	(India) IND	Lalchhuan Mawia	2	0	0+0	0	0+0	0	0+2	0
24	DF	(India) IND	Salam Ranjan Singh	23	1	9+2	1	3+1	0	5+3	0
33	DF	(India) IND	Gursimrat Singh	3	0	1+0	0	0+0	0	1+1	0
Midfielders
8	MF	(India) IND	Lenny Rodrigues	23	1	14+0	1	3+1	0	4+1	0
14	MF	(India) IND	Eugeneson Lyngdoh	30	3	12+3	1	4+0	1	10+1	1
16	MF	(India) IND	Shankar Sampingiraj	2	0	0+1	0	0+0	0	1+0	0
17	MF	(Australia) AUS	Cameron Watson	30	1	16+0	0	4+0	1	10+0	0
20	MF	(India) IND	Alwyn George	25	2	6+6	1	3+1	1	6+3	0
37	MF	(India) IND	Mandar Rao Desai	11	1	3+6	1	0+0	0	1+1	0
18	MF	(India) IND	Beikhokhei Beingaichho	3	0	0+1	0	0+0	0	0+2	0
29	MF	(India) IND	Malsawmzuala	11	0	2+3	0	1+1	0	1+3	0
Forwards
7	FW	(India) IND	Seminlen Doungel	12	2	1+4	1	2+0	0	2+3	1
9	FW	(India) IND	Cornell Glen	4	0	0+0	0	0+4	0	0+0	0
11	FW	(India) IND	Sunil Chhetri	30	12	16+0	7	3+0	0	11+0	5
21	FW	(India) IND	Udanta Singh	28	4	15+2	3	3+2	1	4+2	0
25	FW	(India) IND	Daniel Lalhlimpuia	24	2	9+6	2	2+0	0	4+3	0
31	FW	(India) IND	C.K. Vineeth	28	10	8+7	7	1+2	2	10+0	1
36	FW	(Serbia) SRB	Marjan Jugovic	8	2	2+4	1	0+0	0	0+2	1
Players transferred out during the season
~~9~~	MF	(Spain) ESP	Álvaro Rubio	5	0	0+0	0	0+0	0	5+0	0
~~9~~	FW	(Honduras) HON	Roby Norales	4	1	1+3	1	0+0	0	0+0	0
~~15~~	DF	(India) IND	Vishal Kumar	2	0	0+0	0	0+0	0	0+2	0
—	MF	(India) IND	Darren Caldeira	0	0	0+0	0	0+0	0	0+0	0

- Source: soccerway

Updated: 31 May 2017

=== Top scorers ===
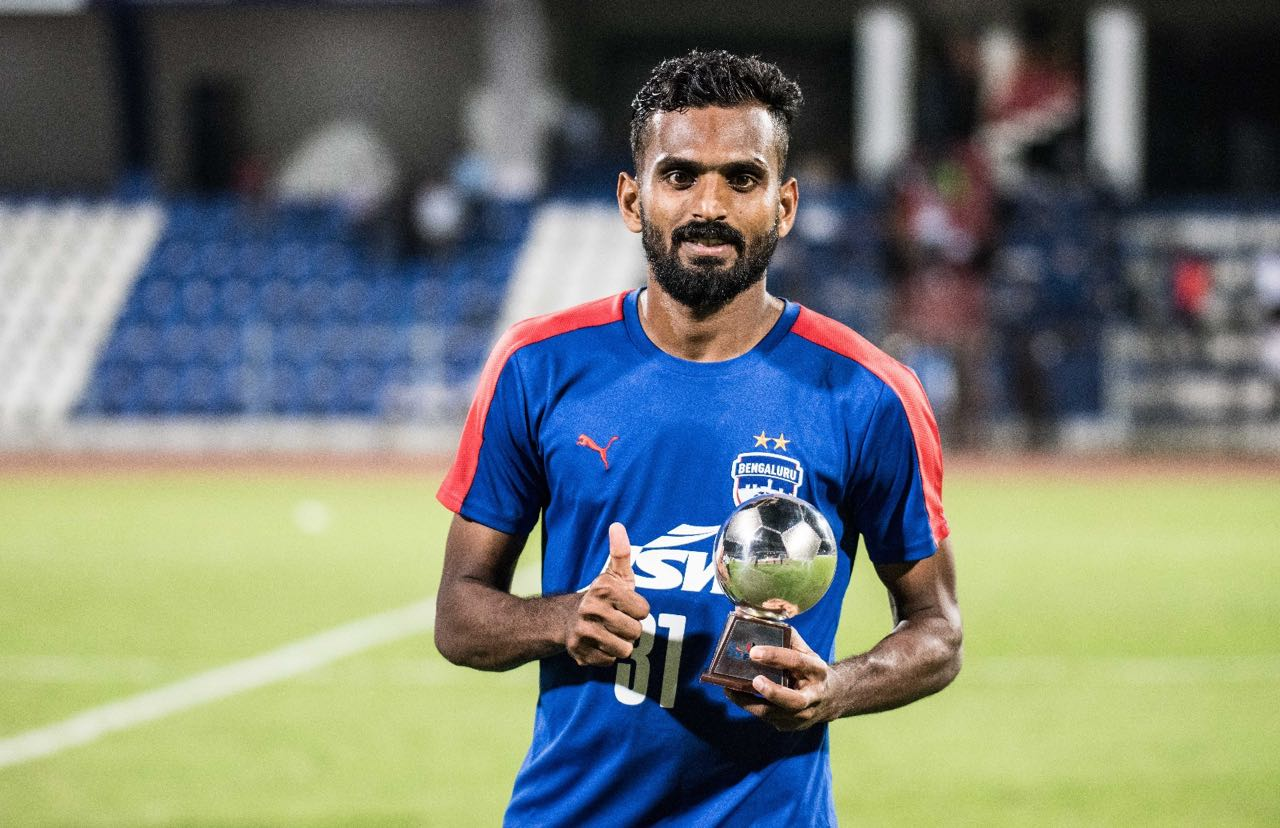
C.K. Vineeth scored a hat-trick against Mumbai on 18 January 2017

Rank	No.	Pos	Nat	Player	I-League	AFC	Federation Cup	Total
1	11	FW	(India)	Sunil Chhetri	7	5	0	12
2	31	FW	(India)	C.K. Vineeth	7	1	2	10
3	21	FW	(India)	Udanta Singh	3	0	1	4
4	14	MF	(India)	Eugeneson Lyngdoh	1	1	1	3
5	25	FW	(India)	Daniel Lalhlimpuia	2	0	0	2
5	36	FW	(Serbia)	Marjan Jugovic	1	1	0	2
5	15	DF	(India)	Sandesh Jhingan	1	1	0	2
5	20	MF	(India)	Alwyn George	1	0	1	2
5	7	FW	(India)	Seminlen Doungel	1	1	0	2
10	4	DF	(Spain)	Juanan	0	1	0	1
10	6	DF	(England)	John Johnson	0	1	0	1
10	8	MF	(India)	Lenny Rodrigues	1	0	0	1
10	9	FW	(Honduras)	Roby Norales	1	0	0	1
10	10	MF	(India)	Harmanjot Khabra	1	0	0	1
10	17	MF	(Australia)	Cameron Watson	0	0	1	1
10	22	DF	(India)	Nishu Kumar	0	1	0	1
10	19	DF	(India)	Sena Ralte	1	0	0	1
10	24	DF	(India)	Salam Ranjan Singh	1	0	0	1
10	37	MF	(India)	Mandar Rao Desai	1	0	0	1
Own goals					0	0	1	1
TOTALS					30	13	7	50

Source: soccerway
Updated: 31 May 2017

=== Clean sheets ===
Rank	No.	Pos	Nat	Player	I-League	AFC	Federation Cup	Total
1	1	GK	(India)	Amrinder Singh	5	4	2	11
2	27	GK	(India)	Arindam Bhattacharya	3	0	0	3
3	28	GK	(India)	Lalthuammawia Ralte	1	1	0	2
TOTALS					9	5	2	16

Source: soccerway
Updated: 31 May 2017

=== Disciplinary record ===
Rank	No.	Pos	Nat	Player	I-League		Federation Cup		AFC		Total		Notes
Rank	No.	Pos	Nat	Player	Yellow card	Red card	Yellow card	Red card	Yellow card	Red card	Yellow card	Red card	Notes
1	10	MF	(India)	Harmanjot Khabra	5	0	1	0	2	0	8	0	Missed a game, against Aizawl (4 yellow cards) (9 April 2017) Missed a game, against Mohun Bagan in 2017 AFC Cup (2 yellow cards) (17 May 2017)
2	14	MF	(India)	Eugeneson Lyngdoh	2	0	3	0	3	0	7	0	Missed a game, against Mohun Bagan (2 yellow cards) (12 May 2017)
2	15	DF	(India)	Sandesh Jhingan	3	0	1	0	3	0	7	0	Missed a game, against Dhaka Abahani (2 yellow cards) (18 April 2017)
2	17	MF	(Australia)	Cameron Watson	3	0	2	0	2	0	7	0	Missed a game, against Dhaka Abahani (2 yellow cards) (18 April 2017); Missed a game, against Mohun Bagan (2 yellow cards) (21 May 2017)
5	4	DF	(Spain)	Juanan	4	0	0	0	1	0	5	0	Missed a game, against DSK Shivajians (4 yellow cards) (22 April 2017)
5	6	DF	(England)	John Johnson	1	1	0	0	3	0	4	1	Missed a game, against DSK Shivajians (red card) (5 February 2017) Missed a game, against Mohun Bagan in 2017 AFC Cup (2 yellow cards) (17 May 2017)
5	11	FW	(India)	Sunil Chhetri	3	0	1	0	1	0	5	0	
5	31	FW	(India)	C.K. Vineeth	2	0	1	0	2	0	5	0	
9	1	GK	(India)	Amrinder Singh	0	0	1	0	2	0	3	0	Missed a game, against Al-Quwa Al-Jawiya (2 yellow cards) (5 November 2016)
9	21	FW	(India)	Udanta Singh	1	0	1	0	1	0	3	0	
9	22	DF	(India)	Nishu Kumar	1	0	0	0	2	0	3	0	
12	19	DF	(India)	Sena Ralte	1	0	0	0	1	0	2	0	
12	24	DF	(India)	Salam Ranjan Singh	0	0	1	0	1	0	2	0	
14	7	FW	(India)	Seminlen Doungel	0	0	1	0	0	0	1	0	
14	8	MF	(India)	Lenny Rodrigues	1	0	0	0	0	0	1	0	
14	9	MF	(Spain)	Alvaro Rubio	0	0	0	0	1	0	1	0	
14	30	MF	(India)	Malsawmzuala	1	0	0	0	0	0	1	0	
14	33	DF	(India)	Gursimrat Singh Gill	0	0	0	0	1	0	1	0	
14	36	FW	(Serbia)	Marjan Jugovic	1	0	0	0	0	0	1	0	
TOTALS					28	1	12	0	26	0	66	1	

Source: soccerway
Updated: 31 May 2017

== See also ==
- 2016–17 in Indian football
