= 2016 AFC Cup final =

- Event: 2016 AFC Cup
Al-Quwa Al-Jawiya	Bengaluru
(Iraq)	(India)
1	0
- Date: 5 November 2016
- Venue: Suheim Bin Hamad Stadium, Doha
- Man of the Match: (Iraq) Hammadi Ahmed
- Referee: Kim Jong-hyeok (South Korea)
- Attendance: 5,806
- Weather: Clear; 27 °C (81 °F); 24% humidity

The 2016 AFC Cup final was the final match of the 2016 AFC Cup, the 13th edition of the AFC Cup, a football competition organized by the Asian Football Confederation (AFC) for clubs from 'developing countries' in Asia according to the Vision Asia plan.

The final was contested as a single match between Iraqi team Al-Quwa Al-Jawiya and Indian team Bengaluru. The match was hosted by Al-Quwa Al-Jawiya at the Suheim Bin Hamad Stadium in Doha on 5 November 2016.

Al-Quwa Al-Jawiya defeated Bengaluru 1–0 to become the first Iraqi team to win the AFC Cup title.

== Venue ==
As Iraqi teams were not allowed to host their home matches in their country, the final was played at the Suheim Bin Hamad Stadium, also known as Qatar SC Stadium, a multi-purpose stadium in Doha, Qatar. It is the home stadium of Qatar Sports Club and holds 13,000 spectators.

== Background ==
Al-Quwa Al-Jawiya qualified for the 2016 AFC Cup group stage as the 2014–15 Iraqi Premier League runners-up. This was their first appearance in the AFC Cup.

Bengaluru qualified for the 2016 AFC Cup as the 2014–15 Indian Federation Cup winners. This was their second consecutive appearance in the AFC Cup.

Both teams reached the AFC Cup final for the first time, and Bengaluru were the first team from India to reach the final.

== Road to the final ==
Note: In all results below, the score of the finalist is given first (H: home; A: away).

(Iraq) Al-Quwa Al-Jawiya				Round	(India) Bengaluru			
Opponent	Result			Group stage	Opponent	Result		
(Palestine) Shabab Al-Dhahiriya	2–0 (A)			Matchday 1	(Laos) Lao Toyota	1–2 (A)		
(Oman) Al-Oruba	2–1 (H)			Matchday 2	(Malaysia) Johor Darul Ta'zim	0–1 (H)		
(Syria) Al-Wahda	2–5 (A)			Matchday 3	(Myanmar) Ayeyawady United	1–0 (A)		
(Syria) Al-Wahda	1–0 (H)			Matchday 4	(Myanmar) Ayeyawady United	5–3 (H)		
(Palestine) Shabab Al-Dhahiriya	4–1 (H)			Matchday 5	(Laos) Lao Toyota	2–1 (H)		
(Oman) Al-Oruba	4–0 (A)			Matchday 6	(Malaysia) Johor Darul Ta'zim	0–3 (A)		
Group C winners: Pos / Team / Pld / Pts; 1 / (Iraq) Al-Quwa Al-Jawiya / 6 / 15; 2 / (Syria) Al-Wahda / 6 / 9; 3 / (Palestine) Shabab Al-Dhahiriya / 6 / 7; 4 / (Oman) Al-Orouba / 6 / 4; Source: AFC				Final standings	Group H runners-up: Pos / Team / Pld / Pts; 1 / (Malaysia) Johor Darul Ta'zim / 6 / 18; 2 / (India) Bengaluru / 6 / 9; 3 / (Myanmar) Ayeyawady United / 6 / 6; 4 / (Laos) Lao Toyota / 6 / 3; Source: AFC			
Opponent	Agg.	1st leg	2nd leg	Knockout stage	Opponent	Agg.	1st leg	2nd leg
(Jordan) Al-Wehdat	2–1 (H)	N/A		Round of 16	(Hong Kong) Kitchee	3–2 (A)	N/A	
(Syria) Al-Jaish	5–1	1–1 (H)	4–0 (A)	Quarter-finals	(Singapore) Tampines Rovers	1–0	1–0 (H)	0–0 (A)
(Lebanon) Al-Ahed	4–3	1–1 (H)	3–2 (A)	Semi-finals	(Malaysia) Johor Darul Ta'zim	4–2	1–1 (A)	3–1 (H)

== Rules ==
The final was played as a single match, with the host team decided by draw. If tied after regulation, extra time and, if necessary, penalty shoot-out would be used to decide the winner.

== Match ==
5 November 2016
19:00 UTC+3

Al-Quwa Al-Jawiya (Iraq)	1–0	(India) Bengaluru
Ahmed 70'	Report

Suheim Bin Hamad Stadium, Doha (Qatar)
Attendance: 5,806
Referee: Kim Jong-hyeok (South Korea)

Al-Quwa Al-Jawiya	Bengaluru

GK	1	(Iraq) Fahad Talib	(yellow card) 90+5'
DF	3	(Iraq) Ali Abdul-Jabbar (c)
DF	4	(Iraq) Saad Natiq
DF	6	(Iraq) Sameh Saeed		(substituted off) 90+3'
FW	9	(Iraq) Emad Mohsin
FW	10	(Iraq) Hammadi Ahmed
MF	11	(Iraq) Humam Tariq		(substituted off) 27'
MF	17	(Iraq) Ahmad Abdul-Amir
DF	36	(Iraq) Ali Bahjat
FW	40	(Iraq) Amjad Radhi		(substituted off) 90+1'
MF	46	(Syria) Zaher Midani
Substitutes
GK	44	(Iraq) Amjed Raheem
MF	15	(Iraq) Osama Ali		(substituted on) 27'
FW	16	(Syria) Ali Ghalioum		(substituted on) 90+1'
MF	20	(Iraq) Mohammad Hasan
MF	38	(Iraq) Halgurd Mulla Mohammed		(substituted on) 90+3'
DF	41	(Iraq) Ahmed Abdul-Ridha
DF	42	(Iraq) Saif Hatem
Manager
(Iraq) Basim Qasim

GK	28	(India) Lalthuammawia Ralte
DF	2	(Spain) Juanan
DF	6	(England) John Johnson
MF	9	(Spain) Álvaro Rubio	(substituted off) 83'
FW	11	(India) Sunil Chhetri (c)
DF	13	(India) Rino Anto
MF	14	(India) Eugeneson Lyngdoh
MF	20	(India) Alwyn George	(substituted off) 64'
DF	20	(India) Nishu Kumar	(substituted off) 64'
MF	26	(Australia) Cameron Watson
FW	31	(India) C. K. Vineeth
Substitutes
GK	32	(India) Calvin Abhishek
DF	5	(India) Keegan Pereira
MF	17	(India) Seminlen Doungel	(substituted on) 64'
MF	21	(India) Udanta Singh	(substituted on) 64'
DF	24	(India) Salam Ranjan Singh	(substituted on) 83'
FW	25	(India) Daniel Lalhlimpuia
MF	30	(India) Malsawmzuala
Manager
(Spain) Albert Roca

AFC Man of the Match:
(Iraq) Hammadi Ahmad (Al-Quwa Al-Jawiya)

Assistant referees:
Yoon Kwang-yeol (South Korea)
Kim Young-ha (South Korea)
Fourth official:
Kim Hee-gon (South Korea)
Fifth official:
Park Sang-jun (South Korea)

Match rules

- 90 minutes.
- 30 minutes of extra time if necessary.
- Penalty shoot-out if scores still level.
- Seven named substitutes, of which up to three may be used.
