= Gursimrat Singh Gill =

Indian footballer

Personal information
- Date of birth: 2 November 1997 (age 29)
- Place of birth: Sarabha, Ludhiana, Punjab, India
- Height: 1.77 m (5 ft 10 in)
- Position: Centre-back

Team information
- Current team: Inter Kashi
- Number: 33

Youth career
- 2007–2012: Chandigarh Football Academy
- 2012–2016: AIFF Elite Academy

Senior career*
Years	Team	Apps	(Gls)
2016–2017	Bengaluru	1	(0)
2017–2018	NorthEast United	5	(0)
2018–2020	Bengaluru	7	(0)
2020–2021	Sudeva Delhi	13	(1)
2021–2022	ATK Mohun Bagan	2	(0)
2022–2023	Mumbai City	1	(0)
2023–2025	East Bengal	3	(0)
2025	→ Delhi (loan)	8	(0)
2025–2026	Rajasthan United	10	(0)
2026–	Inter Kashi	0	(0)

International career^{‡}
2014–2015	India U19		
- * Club domestic league appearances and goals as of 20:33, 8 May 2026 (UTC) ‡ National team caps and goals as of 18 April 2017

Gursimrat Singh Gill (born 2 November 1997) is an Indian professional footballer who plays as a defender for Indian Super League club Inter Kashi.

== Career ==
=== Early career ===
Gill was born in Sarabha, a village located in the Ludhiana district of Punjab. Despite his father and uncle being more fond of hockey, Gill found a passion for football and would usually play with his friends at a nearby ground. In 2007, on the suggestion of a former Chandigarh Football Academy trainee, Ravinder, Gill attended trials for the famed academy and competed for a spot against around 100 other players. Gill's trial was successful and he joined the academy.

Gill trained at the Chandigarh Football Academy for five years from 2007 to 2012. Initially playing as a left-back, Gill was soon moved to become a centre-back. In 2010, he won his first major championship with the academy, the under-14 competition of the Subroto Cup. In 2012, Gill left the Chandigarh Football Academy in order to join the All India Football Federation's regional academy in Navi Mumbai. While in the AIFF Academy setup, Gill played in various competitions, including the I-League U19. He also became a part of the national under-17 side and national under-20 side. In 2013, Gill, along with four other players from the under-17's, was sent to the Nike All Asia Camp in Doha, Qatar. The camp lasted for three days and at the end, Gill, alongside India teammate Bidyananda Singh, was selected to participate in the All-Star Game. During the game and the camp overall, both Gill and Singh managed to catch the eye of European clubs such as Barcelona and Inter Milan. Two years later, in 2015, Gill helped the AIFF Elite Academy win the 2014–15 I-League U19.

=== Bengaluru FC ===
After spending four years with the AIFF Elite Academy, Gill signed his first professional contract with Bengaluru FC of the I-League on 23 August 2016. Head coach Albert Roca was very pleased with the signing of Gill, stating "The club’s philosophy is to give young talent a stage and I believe that’s exactly what Gursimrat has got. He is talented, works hard and wants to keep improving which is a good sign for anyone taking the professional path." Gill was on the bench for Bengaluru FC a month later on 21 September in their AFC Cup quarter-final match against Tampines Rovers. Despite Bengaluru FC leading the tie 1–0 on aggregate, Gill didn't see any game time. He eventually made his professional debut for the club the next season on 18 April 2017 in the AFC Cup against Abahani. Gill came off the bench for Nishu Kumar in the 89th minute as Bengaluru FC won 2–0. Gill then made his league debut for Bengaluru FC during the final game of the season against Churchill Brothers on 29 April 2017. He played 74 minutes as Bengaluru FC won 3–0.

=== NorthEast United ===
On 21 July 2017, after not being retained by Bengaluru FC, Gill was drafted in the 10th round of the 2017–18 ISL Players Draft by NorthEast United of the Indian Super League.

=== Bengaluru FC ===
On 11 June 2018, Bengaluru FC announced they had signed Gill on a two-year deal.

=== Bengaluru United ===
On 17 September 2020, Gill joined I-League 2nd Division club FC Bengaluru United for the 2019–20 I-League Qualifiers.

=== Sudeva Delhi ===
On 16 October 2020, Gill joined I-League side Sudeva Delhi FC on a two-year deal. He made his debut for Sudeva on 9 January 2021 against Mohammedan SC.

== International ==
In August 2015, Gill was selected to be part of the India under-20 side which would take part in the inaugural SAFF U-20 Championship. Gill was named as vice-captain of the side, while former Chandigarh Football Academy and Bengaluru FC teammate Daniel Lalhlimpuia was given the captaincy. Gill and the under-19 side managed to reach the final of the tournament, where they took on hosts Nepal. The team lost on penalties 5–4 after drawing after extra-time 1–1. Despite the defeat and being given the vice-captaincy, Gill was optimistic about the opportunity to play in the tournament, stating "It was an enriching experience. The tournament itself was a high point for me and despite being the vicecaptain, I felt no pressure".

== Career statistics ==
=== Club ===
As of 19 February 2023

Club	Season	League			Cup		AFC		Total	
Club	Season	Division	Apps	Goals	Apps	Goals	Apps	Goals	Apps	Goals
Bengaluru	2016–17	I-League	1	0	0	0	2 (Note: Appearance(s) in AFC Cup)	0	3	0
NorthEast United	2017–18	Indian Super League	5	0	0	0	—		5	0
Bengaluru	2018–19	Indian Super League	5	0	0	0	—		5	0
Bengaluru	2019–20	Indian Super League	2	0	3 (Note: Appearance(s) in Durand Cup)	0	3	0	8	0
Sudeva Delhi	2020–21	I-League	13	1	0	0	—		13	1
ATK Mohun Bagan	2021–22	Indian Super League	2	0	0	0	2	0	4	0
Mumbai City	2022–23	Indian Super League	1	0	2	0	—		3	0
East Bengal	2023–24	Indian Super League	1	0	3	0	0	0	0	0
Career total			30	1	8	0	7	0	45	1

== Honours ==
Bengaluru

- Indian Super League: 2018–19
- Federation Cup: 2016–17
- AFC Cup: runner-up 2016

Mumbai City

- Indian Super League (Premiership): 2022–23

East Bengal

Super Cup 2024
