= 2017 Indian Federation Cup final =

- Event: 2016–17 Indian Federation Cup
Bengaluru FC	Mohun Bagan
2	0
- After extra time
- Date: 21 May 2017
- Venue: Barabati Stadium, Cuttack
- Man of the Match: Amrinder Singh
- Referee: C.R. Srikrishna

The 2017 Indian Federation Cup final was a football match between Bengaluru FC and Mohun Bagan played on 21 May 2017 at Barabati Stadium in Cuttack. Bengaluru FC won their second Federation Cup title after having won the first time in 2014–15.

== Background ==
Mohun Bagan played a record 20th Federation Cup final, having won 14 previously. Bengaluru FC played their second final, having won 2014–15 Indian Federation Cup.

After the injury of the captain Sunil Chhetri in the group stage, due to harsh weather conditions and cramped schedule, Bengaluru FC requested to postpone the match to 24 May, but the request was denied. Before the match, Roca remarked, "I would say Bagan are the favourites with some big names on their roster and the availability of all four foreigners for this fixture. We have no problem being the underdogs."

== Match ==
=== Details ===
21 May 2017
19:00 IST

Bengaluru FC	2–0 (a.e.t.)	Mohun Bagan
Khabra (yellow card) 10'; Lyngdoh (yellow card) 13'; Vineeth 107', 119'	Report	Norde (yellow card) 10'; Sehnaj (yellow card) 79'; Kotal (yellow card) 100'

Barabati Stadium, Cuttack
Referee: C.R. Srikrishna

Bengaluru FC	Mohun Bagan
