= Daniel Lalhlimpuia =

Indian footballer (born 1997)

Personal information
- Date of birth: 12 September 1997 (age 29)
- Place of birth: Serchhip, Mizoram, India
- Height: 1.77 m (5 ft 9 1/2 in)
- Position: Striker

Team information
- Current team: Malappuram FC
- Number: 29

Youth career
- 2007–2013: Chandigarh Football Academy
- 2013–2015: AIFF Elite Academy

Senior career*
Years	Team	Apps	(Gls)
2015–2018	Bengaluru	23	(3)
2016	→ Chennaiyin (loan)	3	(0)
2018–2022	Odisha	50	(5)
2022–2024	Punjab	22	(1)
2024–2025	Mumbai City	4	(0)
2025	Jamshedpur		
2026	Goa		

International career^{‡}
2011–2012	India U17	12	(6)
2013	India U20	10	(0)
2017–2020	India U23	4	(0)
2016–	India	3	(0)
- * Club domestic league appearances and goals ‡ National team caps and goals as of 8 January 2020

Daniel Lalhlimpuia (born 12 September 1997) is an Indian professional footballer who plays as a forward.

A product of the AIFF Elite Academy, Lalhlimpuia made his professional debut for Bengaluru in 2016. He was considered one of the most promising players in his age group and was named captain of the national under-19 side in 2015. He made his senior international debut in September 2016 against Puerto Rico.

== Career ==
=== Early career ===
Born in the village of Serchhip, Mizoram, Lalhlimpuia started playing football in his village and for his school. While playing for his school team he was called in for a trial with the Chandigarh Football Academy which he was successful in. At the Chandigarh Football Academy, Lalhlimpuia was under the coaching of Harjinder Singh. In 2012, during the Administrators Challenge Cup, Lalhlimpuia ended as the tournament top scorer, scoring 19 goals. He stayed with the Chandigarh Football Academy until 2013 when he was selected to join the AIFF Elite Academy.

=== Bengaluru FC ===
In August 2015, while with the India U19 side, Lalhlimpuia scored a goal in each of the side's two matches against I-League side Bengaluru. After the matches, he signed a two-year professional contract with Bengaluru FC in November 2015. He made his professional debut for the club on 24 February 2016 during an AFC Cup match against Lao Toyota. He came off the bench for Shankar Sampingiraj as Bengaluru fell 2–1.

Lalhlimpuia scored his first professional goal for the club on 2 April 2016 in the I-League against Mumbai. He came off the bench in the 75th minute and found the net six minutes later to win the match for Bengaluru 1–0. He then scored his second goal of the season in an AFC Cup match on 25 May 2016 against Kitchee. He scored the winning goal during that match in the 51st minute as Bengaluru won 3–2.

The next season, after his temporary loan spell with Chennaiyin, Lalhlimpuia started getting more playing time in the I-League for Bengaluru. On 8 March 2017 he scored the equalizer for the club against Chennai City. He chipped the ball forward for Udanta Singh who crossed the ball into the middle. The ball was parried by Karanjit Singh directly at Lalhlimpuia who put it in the back of the net. Bengaluru drew that match 1–1. He then scored the opening goal in the club's last match of the I-League season against Churchill Brothers on 29 April. Gursimrat Singh Gill crossed the ball from the right and Lalhlimpuia tapped it into the net to give Bengaluru FC a 1–0 lead which they would eventually increase to 3–0. Lalhlimpuia parted ways with Bengaluru at the end of 2017–18 season.

==== Chennaiyin (loan) ====
On 4 August 2016, alongside under-20 teammate Uttam Rai, Lalhlimpuia was loaned to Chennaiyin for the 2016 Indian Super League as a developmental player. However, Lalhlimpuia wouldn't join Chennaiyin officially until his parent club, Bengaluru, completed their AFC Cup commitments.

On 20 November 2016, 15 days after being on the bench at the 2016 AFC Cup final, Lalhlimpuia made his debut for Chennaiyin. He came on as a 22nd-minute substitute for Jeje Lalpekhlua as Chennaiyin drew Atlético de Kolkata 1–1. He would go on to play two more matches for the side before returning to Bengaluru FC.

==== Punjab FC ====
On 14 September 2022, Daniel signed for Roungdglass Punjab.

==== Mumbai City FC ====
On 8 July 2024, Daniel signed for Mumbai City FC on a one-year deal until the end of the season. He made his debut for the club against Chennaiyin FC on 9 November 2024, as a late substitute, replacing Nikos Karelis.

== International ==
Lalhlimpuia's first experience with international football came in 2011, when he was included in the India U16 side that would participate in the 2011 SAFF U-16 Championship. He scored two goals during the tournament as India made it to the final, only to lose to Pakistan 2–1. He was then selected to be part of the squad that would represent India in the 2012 AFC U-16 Championship qualifiers. During the qualifiers, Lalhlimpuia and future Chennaiyin teammate Uttam Rai created a good partnership upfront as India qualified for the tournament proper. The next year, during the 2012 AFC U-16 Championship, India finished last in their group without a victory but Lalhlimpuia scored during the final game against China.

In August 2013, Lalhlimpuia was called up to the India U20 side that would travel to China and participate in a couple friendlies. He was later part of the squad that would participate in the 2014 AFC U-19 Championship qualifiers. India eventually failed to qualify for the tournament. In August 2015, Lalhlimpuia was named captain of the under-20 side when they participated in the 2015 SAFF U-19 Championship. He was also part of the under-20 side that participated in the 2016 AFC U-19 Championship qualifiers but once again failed to qualify.

On 25 August 2016, Lalhlimpuia was named into Stephen Constantine's squad for India's friendly against Puerto Rico. He made his debut during that game on 3 September, coming on as a 77th-minute substitute for Sunil Chhetri. India won the match 4–1. On 22 March 2017, Lalhlimpuia made his first start for the national team in a friendly against Cambodia. He played the first-half before being substituted at halftime for Jeje Lalpekhlua. India eventually went on to win the match 3–2.

== Career statistics ==
=== Club ===
As of 6 January 2025

Club	Season	League			Cup		AFC		Total	
Club	Season	Division	Apps	Goals	Apps	Goals	Apps	Goals	Apps	Goals!
Bengaluru	2015–16	I-League	5	1	2 (Note: Appearance(s) in Federation Cup)	0	7 (Note: Appearance(s) in AFC Cup)	1	14	2
Bengaluru	2016–17	I-League	16	2	2	0	10	0	28	2
Bengaluru	2017–18	Indian Super League	2	0	1 (Note: Appearance(s) in Super Cup)	0	8	4	11	4
Bengaluru	Total		23	3	5	0	25	5	53	8
Chennaiyin (loan)	2016	Indian Super League	3	0	0	0	—		3	0
Odisha	2018–19	Indian Super League	14	4	3	1	—		17	5
Odisha	2019–20	Indian Super League	16	0	0	0	—		16	0
Odisha	2020–21	Indian Super League	12	0	0	0	—		12	0
Odisha	2021–22	Indian Super League	8	1	0	0	—		8	1
Odisha	Total		50	5	3	1	0	0	53	6
Punjab	2022–23	I-League	16	1	3	0	—		19	1
Punjab	2023–24	Indian Super League	6	0	3 (Note: Appearance(s) in Durand Cup)	0	—		9	0
Punjab	Total		22	1	6	0	0	0	28	1
Mumbai City	2024–25	Indian Super League	4	0	0	0	—		4	0
Jamshedpur	2025–26	Indian Super League	0	0	0	0	—		0	0
Career total			102	9	14	1	25	5	141	15

=== International ===
As of 5 October 2016

India national team
Year	Apps	Goals
2016	1	0
2017	1	0
Total	2	0

== Honours ==
=== Club ===
Bengaluru FC

- I-League: 2015–16
- Federation Cup: 2016–17
