= Ranjan Singh Salam =

Indian footballer (born 1995)

Ranjan Singh
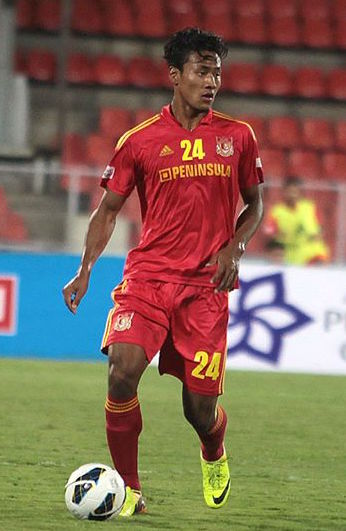

Personal information
- Full name: Ranjan Singh Salam
- Date of birth: 4 December 1995 (age 30)
- Place of birth: Kha-Potshangbam, Manipur, India
- Height: 1.85 m (6 ft 1 in)
- Position: Centre-back

Youth career
- 2011–2013: Pune

Senior career*
Years	Team	Apps	(Gls)
2013–2016	Pune	16	(0)
2015–2016	→ Bengaluru (loan)	3	(0)
2016	→ NorthEast United (loan)	2	(0)
2017	Bengaluru	11	(1)
2017–2019	East Bengal	21	(0)
2019–2020	ATK	4	(0)
2020–2021	ATK Mohun Bagan	1	(0)
2021–2023	Chennaiyin	3	(0)
2023	TRAU	7	(0)
2023–2025	Gokulam Kerala	29	(0)

International career^{‡}
2016	India U23	7	(0)
2018–2019	India	11	(0)
- * Club domestic league appearances and goals as of 21:22, 3 March 2025 (UTC) ‡ National team caps and goals as of 19:00, 24 January 2019 (UTC)

Ranjan Singh Salam (Meitei: Salam Ranjan Singh, born 4 December 1995) is an Indian professional footballer who plays as a defender.

== Career ==
Born in Kha-Potshangbam, Manipur, Singh started playing football as a striker, before being converted into a central defender by his coach, Shiband Sir. In 2010, during an All-Manipur Inter District tournament, Singh impressed Maniratnam, a coach who worked with the Directorate of Youth and Sports Affairs. Through Maniratnam, Singh attended trials for Pune's academy in 2011 and made it into the team. While with the academy, Singh was part of the under-19 side which won back-to-back I-League U19 titles. He was also selected to be part of the Maharashtra side which participated in the 2013 Santosh Trophy. At the end of the 2012–13 season, Singh was awarded the "Best-Disciplined Under-19 Player" award by the club.

Prior to the 2013–14 I-League season, Pune head coach Mike Snoei gave Singh a place in the first-team squad. He appeared for the first-team squad for the first time during Pune's opening I-League match of the season against Mohammedan. He started and remained on the bench for the entirety of the match as Pune won 3–1. Singh eventually made his competitive debut for Pune in the I-League on 2 November 2013 against Sporting Goa at Duler Stadium. He came on as a 21st-minute substitute for the injured Calum Angus as Pune lost 2–0.

On 26 February 2014, Singh made his competitive international club tournament debut for Pune in the AFC Cup against Nay Pyi Taw. He started and played the full match as Pune drew 2–2 against the side from Myanmar.

=== Bengaluru FC (loan) ===
On 23 October 2015, after Pune announced they would withdraw from the I-League, Singh signed on loan with fellow I-League side Bengaluru FC for the 2015–16 season. He made his debut for the side in an away match against East Bengal on 30 January 2016. He came on as a 94th-minute substitute as Bengaluru FC won 1–0.

On 5 November 2016, Singh came on as a late substitute for Bengaluru in their 2016 AFC Cup final match against Al-Quwa Al-Jawiya. He came on as an 83rd-minute substitute for Álvaro Rubio but could not prevent Bengaluru FC from falling 1–0.

=== NorthEast United ===
On 7 September 2016, after spending the season with Bengaluru, Singh signed with NorthEast United of the Indian Super League. Despite signing for the team before the season, due to AFC Cup commitments with Bengaluru FC, Singh missed the beginning of the ISL season.

Singh did eventually make his debut for NorthEast United on 22 November 2016 against Pune City. He started and played the full match as NorthEast United won 1–0.

=== Bengaluru ===
After the Indian Super League season, it was confirmed that Singh would re-join Bengaluru for the 2016–17 I-League. He made his season debut for the club on 5 February 2017 against DSK Shivajians. He started the match and scored the 90th-minute equalizer for Bengaluru FC as the club came out with a 2–2 draw.

=== East Bengal ===
In June 2017, Singh signed for Kolkatan club East Bengal.

=== ATK ===
In August 2019, ATK Mohun Bagan signed Singh on a three-year deal.

=== Chennaiyin FC ===
On 2 July 2021, Salam Ranjan Singh was signed by Chennaiyin FC on a multi-year deal.

=== Gokulam Kerala ===
On July 13, 2023, Singh signed with Gokulam Kerala on a Two-year deal until 2025.

== International ==
On 6 February 2017 it was announced that Singh would be part of the India U23 side that would take part in the 2016 South Asian Games. He made his international debut for the side on the same day in their opening match against Sri Lanka. He started the match but could not prevent India from falling 1–0 to the Sri Lankans.

=== International statistics ===
As of 14 January 2019

National team	Year	Apps	Goals
India	2017	1	0
India	2018	9	0
India	2019	1	0
Total		11	0

== Career statistics ==
As of 03 March 2025

Club	Season	League			League Cup		Domestic Cup		Continental		Total	
Club	Season	Division	Apps	Goals	Apps	Goals	Apps	Goals	Apps	Goals	Apps	Goals
Pune	2013–14	I-League	13	0	0	0	0	0	5	0	18	0
Pune	2014–15	I-League	3	0	0	0	0	0	0	0	3	0
Bengaluru (loan)	2015–16	I-League	3	0	2	0	0	0	6	0	11	0
NorthEast United (loan)	2016	Indian Super League	2	0	—	—	0	0	—	—	2	0
Bengaluru	2016–17	I-League	11	1	5	0	0	0	4	0	20	1
East Bengal	2017–18	I-League	16	0	4	0	0	0	0	0	20	0
East Bengal	2018–19	I-League	5	0	0	0	0	0	0	0	5	0
ATK	2019–20	Indian Super League	4	0	0	0	0	0	0	0	4	0
ATK Mohun Bagan	2020–21	Indian Super League	1	0	0	0	0	0	0	0	1	0
Chennaiyin	2021–22	Indian Super League	3	0	0	0	0	0	0	0	3	0
Chennaiyin	2022–23	Indian Super League	0	0	0	0	0	0	0	0	0	0
TRAU	2022–23	I-League	7	0	1	0	1	0	0	0	9	0
Gokulam Kerala	2023–24	I-League	18	0	0	0	3 (Note: Appearance(s) in Durand Cup)	0	0	0	21	0
Gokulam Kerala	2024–25	I-League	12	0	0	0	0	0	0	0	12	0
Career total			98	1	12	0	4	0	15	0	129	1

== Honours ==
India

- SAFF Championship runner-up: 2018
- Intercontinental Cup: 2018

India U23

- South Asian Games Silver medal: 2016

Bengaluru

- I-League: 2015–16
