= Marjan Jugović =

Serbian footballer (born 1983)

Personal information
- Date of birth: 26 August 1983 (age 43)
- Place of birth: Kruševac, SFR Yugoslavia
- Height: 1.88 m (6 ft 2 in)
- Position: Forward

Youth career
- Napredak Kruševac

Senior career*
Years	Team	Apps	(Gls)
2001–2006	Napredak Kruševac		
2006–2008	Željezničar Sarajevo	29	(6)
2008	Mladost Lučani	7	(0)
2008–2009	Wisła Płock	7	(3)
2009	Polonia Bytom	3	(0)
2010	Zeta Golubovci	15	(3)
2010–2011	Napredak Kruševac	7	(1)
2011	Al-Ittihad Aleppo		
2011–2012	Busaiteen		
2013	Sloga Kraljevo	6	(0)
2013	Keflavík	8	(1)
2013–2014	Zvijezda Gradačac	6	(4)
2015	Barito Putera	0	(0)
2015–2016	Akhaa Ahli Aley		
2017	Bengaluru	6	(1)
- * Club domestic league appearances and goals

Marjan Jugović (Serbian Cyrillic: Марјан Југовић, born 26 August 1983) is a Serbian former professional footballer who played as a forward.

== Career ==
=== Napredak ===
Born in Kruševac, Jugović started his career in Serbia at FK Napredak Kruševac. He played with Napredak in the Second League until 2006, except for the 2003–04 season, when Napredak competed in the First League of Serbia and Montenegro after becoming the champions of the second league the season before. In the summer of 2006, he joined Željezničar Sarajevo, spending one and half season with them in the Bosnian Premier League.

=== Poland ===
On 27 August 2008, Jugović signed a contract with Polish club Wisła Płock. In early 2009, he transferred to Ekstraklasa side Polonia Bytom. Jugović stayed there for a short time, because the club was declared bankrupt.

=== Zeta ===
During 2010, Jugović played with Zeta in the Montenegrin First League. He played with them in their qualifying matches for the UEFA Europa League that season.

=== Syria ===
In early 2011, he signed a four-year contract with Al-Ittihad Aleppo, playing with them the qualification for the Asian Champions League against Al Sadd SC of Qatar, but they lost the match 5–1. They continued to compete in AFC Cup. After only four months in Syria, he was forced to leave Syria because of the Syrian civil war.

On 1 October 2011, Jugović signed a one-year contract with Busaiteen Club from Bahrain.

=== Iceland ===
In March 2013, he joined Icelandic Premier club Keflavík. He scored in his debut against Fimleikafélag Hafnarfjarðar (FH) on 6 May 2013.

=== Indonesia ===
On 20 December 2014 he signed with Indonesia Super League club Barito Putera.

=== Lebanon ===
When the Indonesian league was suspended by FIFA, Jugovic signed a contract with Al-Akhaa Al-Ahli Aley from Lebanon. Their Syrian coach, Afash, made a team, with local players, and also with a few foreign players. The team finished the season in 4th position.

=== India ===
In February 2017, Jugovic was signed by I-League champions Bengaluru.

== Honours ==
Al-Ittihad Aleppo

- Syrian Cup: 2010–11
