= Juanan =

Spanish footballer

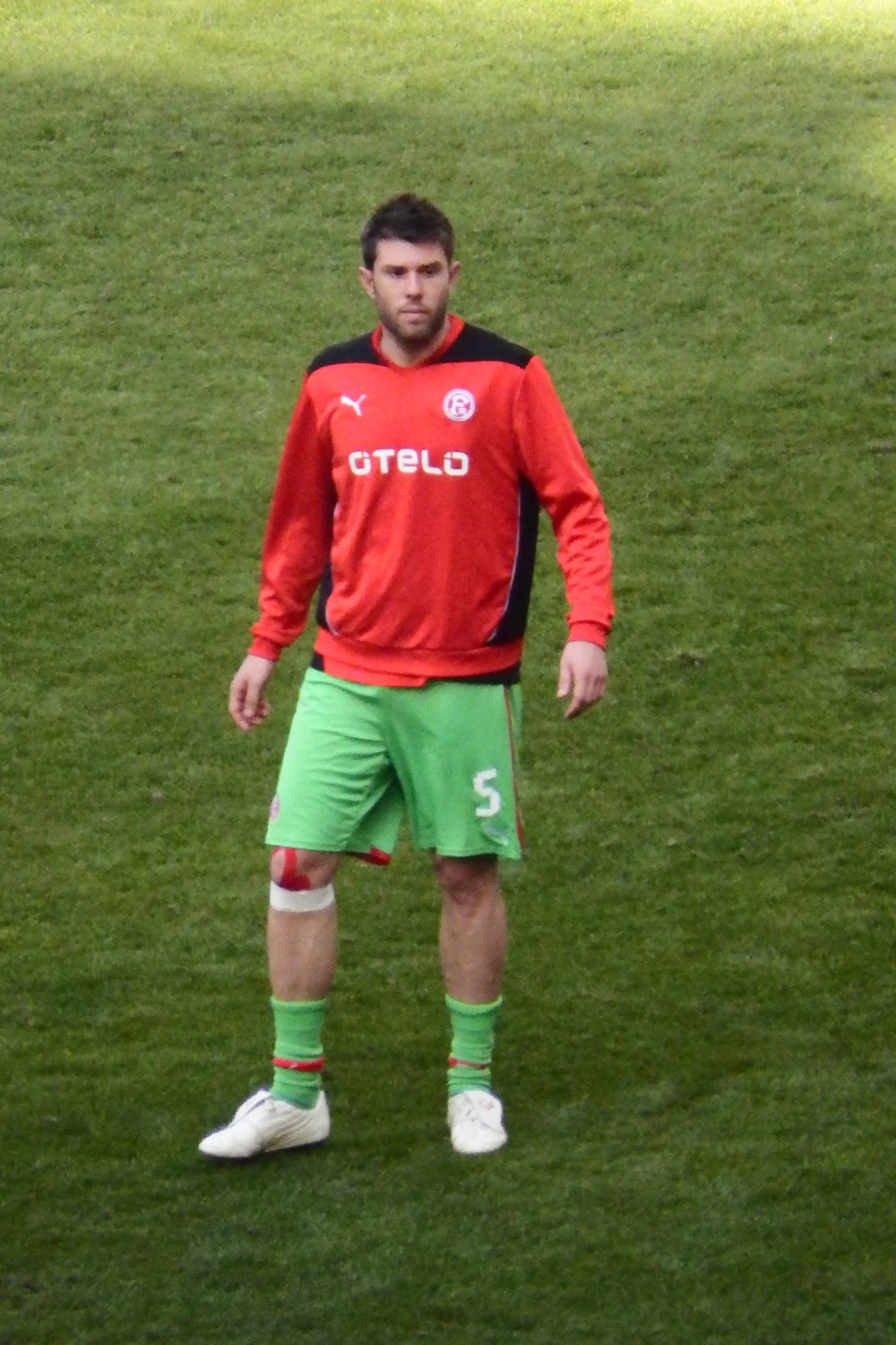
- Juanan training with Düsseldorf in 2013

Personal information
- Full name: Juan Antonio González Fernández
- Date of birth: 27 April 1987 (age 39)
- Place of birth: Palma, Spain
- Height: 1.92 m (6 ft 4 in)
- Position: Centre-back

Youth career
- 1995–2004: San Pedro
- 2004–2005: Mallorca
- 2005–2007: San Francisco

Senior career*
Years	Team	Apps	(Gls)
2007–2009	Deportivo La Coruña B	71	(5)
2009–2011	Real Madrid B	52	(0)
2011–2013	Fortuna Düsseldorf	34	(2)
2013–2014	Újpest	19	(1)
2014–2015	Recreativo	26	(0)
2015–2016	Leganés	0	(0)
2016	Rayo OKC	7	(0)
2016–2021	Bengaluru	86	(5)
2021–2022	Hyderabad	21	(0)
2023	Sóller	9	(1)
Total		325	(14)
- * Club domestic league appearances and goals

Juan Antonio González Fernández (born 27 April 1987), commonly known as Juanan, is a Spanish former professional footballer who played as a centre-back.

== Club career ==
Born in Palma de Mallorca, Juanan played youth football for three clubs, including local RCD Mallorca from ages 17 to 18. He signed with Deportivo de La Coruña in the summer of 2007, but appeared almost exclusively with the B team over the course of two Segunda División B seasons, being relegated in the second. With the main squad, he featured 21 minutes in a UEFA Cup match against AaB Fodbold, coming on as a substitute for Filipe Luís in an eventual 1–3 home loss in the round of 32 on 26 February 2009.

After his contract with the Galicians ended, Juanan joined another side in the third division, Real Madrid Castilla, appearing in 29 games (all starts) in his second year as the Real Madrid reserves fell short in the promotion playoffs. In late June 2011, he moved to Germany and signed for Fortuna Düsseldorf.

Juanan made his official debut with Fortuna on 24 July 2011, playing three minutes in a 1–1 2. Bundesliga draw at SC Paderborn 07. He scored his first goal in the competition on 16 September in a 4–2 away win over FC Erzgebirge Aue, and contributed another one in 19 matches as his team returned to the Bundesliga after a 15-year absence.

In the following seasons, Juanan represented in quick succession Újpest FC (Hungary), Recreativo de Huelva and CD Leganés, being relegated from the second tier with the second club and only appearing in the Copa del Rey with the third. On 3 February 2016, he signed with Rayo OKC from the North American Soccer League, being released from his contract on 11 July.

Juanan joined I-League champions Bengaluru FC on 8 August 2016, on a one-year deal. On 3 March 2018, the 31-year-old further renewed his link until 2020, agreeing to a new two-year extension that year.

On 26 July 2021, Juanan signed a one-year contract with Hyderabad FC also of the Indian Super League. He won that tournament for the second time in his debut campaign, helping to defeat Kerala Blasters FC on penalties.

== Career statistics ==
As of match played on 24 February 2022

Appearances and goals by club, season and competition
Club	Season	League			Cup		Continental		Other		Total	
Club	Season	Division	Apps	Goals	Apps	Goals	Apps	Goals	Apps	Goals	Apps	Goals
Deportivo B	2007–08	Segunda División B	34	4	—		—		2 (Note: Appearances in promotion play-offs)	0	36	4
Deportivo B	2008–09	Segunda División B	37	1	—		—		—		37	1
Deportivo B	Total		71	5	—		—		2	0	73	5
Deportivo	2008–09	La Liga	0	0	0	0	3 (Note: Appearances in UEFA Cup and UEFA Intertoto Cup)	0	—		3	0
Real Madrid B	2009–10	Segunda División B	23	0	—		—		—		23	0
Real Madrid B	2010–11	Segunda División B	29	0	—		—		2	0	31	0
Real Madrid B	Total		52	0	—		—		2	0	54	0
Fortuna Düsseldorf	2011–12	2. Bundesliga	19	2	1	0	—		2	0	22	2
Fortuna Düsseldorf	2012–13	Bundesliga	15	0	2	0	—		—		17	0
Fortuna Düsseldorf	2013–14	2. Bundesliga	0	0	0	0	—		—		0	0
Fortuna Düsseldorf	Total		34	2	3	0	—		2	0	39	2
Újpest	2013–14	Nemzeti Bajnokság I	19	1	10	2	—		—		29	3
Recreativo	2014–15	Segunda División	26	0	1	0	—		—		27	0
Leganés	2015–16	Segunda División	0	0	3	0	—		—		3	0
Rayo OKC	2016	North American Soccer League	7	0	1	0	—		—		8	0
Bengaluru	2016–17	I-League	15	0	5	0	11 (Note: Appearances in AFC Cup and AFC Champions League)	1	—		31	1
Bengaluru	2017–18	Indian Super League	18	1	3	0	9 (Note: Appearances in AFC Cup)	0	–		30	1
Bengaluru	2018–19	Indian Super League	20	1	1	0	2	0	–		23	1
Bengaluru	2019–20	Indian Super League	19	1	0	0	4	0			23	1
Bengaluru	2020–21	Indian Super League	14	2	0	0	1	0			15	2
Hyderabad	2021–22	Indian Super League	17	0	0	0	0	0	0	0	17	0
Career total			312	13	27	2	30	1	6	0	375	16

== Honours ==
Újpest

- Hungarian Cup: 2013–14

Bengaluru

- Indian Super League: 2018–19
- Federation Cup: 2016–17
- Super Cup: 2018
- AFC Cup runner-up: 2016

Hyderabad

- Indian Super League: 2021–22
