= Albert Roca =

Spanish footballer and manager

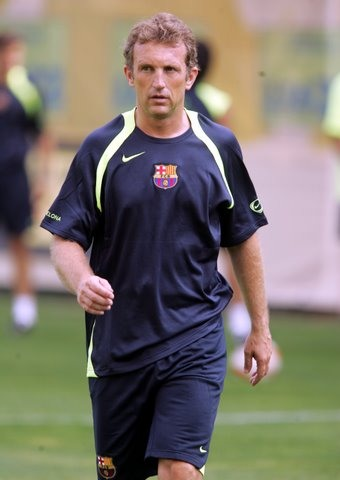
- Roca during his first coaching spell with Barcelona

Personal information
- Full name: Albert Roca Pujol
- Date of birth: 20 October 1962 (age 64)
- Place of birth: Granollers, Spain
- Height: 1.78 m (5 ft 10 in)
- Position: Centre-back

Team information
- Current team: Philippines (assistant coach)

Senior career*
Years	Team	Apps	(Gls)
1982–1983	Hospitalet	21	(1)
1983–1984	Sabadell	34	(0)
1984–1986	Zaragoza B	67	(2)
1986	Zaragoza	1	(0)
1986–1987	Sabadell	26	(1)
1987–1988	Zaragoza	4	(0)
1988–1990	Atlético Madrileño	55	(3)
1990–1992	Palamós	17	(0)
Total		225	(7)

Managerial career
- 1997–1998: Europa (assistant)
- 1998–1999: Europa
- 1999–2000: Manlleu
- 2001–2003: Sabadell (assistant)
- 2003–2008: Barcelona (assistant)
- 2009–2010: Galatasaray (assistant)
- 2011–2013: Saudi Arabia (assistant)
- 2014–2015: El Salvador
- 2016–2018: Bengaluru
- 2020: Hyderabad
- 2020–2021: Barcelona (assistant)
- 2023–: Bengaluru (technical consultant)
- 2025–: Philippines (assistant)
- * Club domestic league appearances and goals

Albert Roca Pujol (born 20 October 1962) is a Spanish professional football manager and former footballer. He currently works as the technical consultant for Indian Super League club Bengaluru FC and also assistant coach of Philippines.

== Playing career ==
Born in Granollers, Barcelona, Catalonia, Roca spent most of his career with clubs in his native region, starting out at CE L'Hospitalet in the Segunda División B. In 1984 he signed for Real Zaragoza, being assigned to the B team also in that league and helping them promote to the Segunda División in his first season.

Roca's input at the professional level consisted of 75 games and three goals in the second tier with Zaragoza B, Atlético Madrid B and Palamós CF, and 31 matches and one goal in La Liga with Zaragoza and CE Sabadell CF. He scored his only goal in the latter competition on 8 March 1987, in a 3–1 away loss against RCD Español whilst playing for the latter side.

Roca retired at the end of the 1991–92 campaign, aged 29.

== Coaching career ==
Roca began working as a head coach in 1998, at CE Europa in the Tercera División. He won the Copa Catalunya against FC Barcelona, before switching to neighbouring club AEC Manlleu the following year.

In 2001, Roca joined Sabadell's coaching staff, leaving two years later for Barcelona under newly appointed Frank Rijkaard. The pair went on to work together at Galatasaray SK and the Saudi Arabia national team.

On 12 May 2014, Roca was appointed as manager of El Salvador. His first game in charge occurred on 4 June at the Toyota Stadium in Frisco, Texas, ending with a 1–2 friendly defeat to Ivory Coast. His first win came against the Dominican Republic in another exhibition match, on 30 August (2–0).

Roca returned to club duties on 6 July 2016, signing a two-year contract with I-League champions Bengaluru FC. They immediately proceeded to reach the final of the AFC Cup, becoming the first team in the country to achieve the feat but eventually losing 1–0 to Iraq's Al-Quwa Al-Jawiya. Subsequently, and still under his guidance, the side won the 2016–17 edition of the Federation Cup and reached the finals in the Indian Super League.

On 12 January 2020, Roca became head coach of Hyderabad FC also in the Indian top flight. He returned to Barcelona in August after agreeing to terminate his two-year contract, as fitness coach under newly appointed Ronald Koeman.
