= C. K. Vineeth =

Indian footballer (born 1988)

C.K. Vineeth
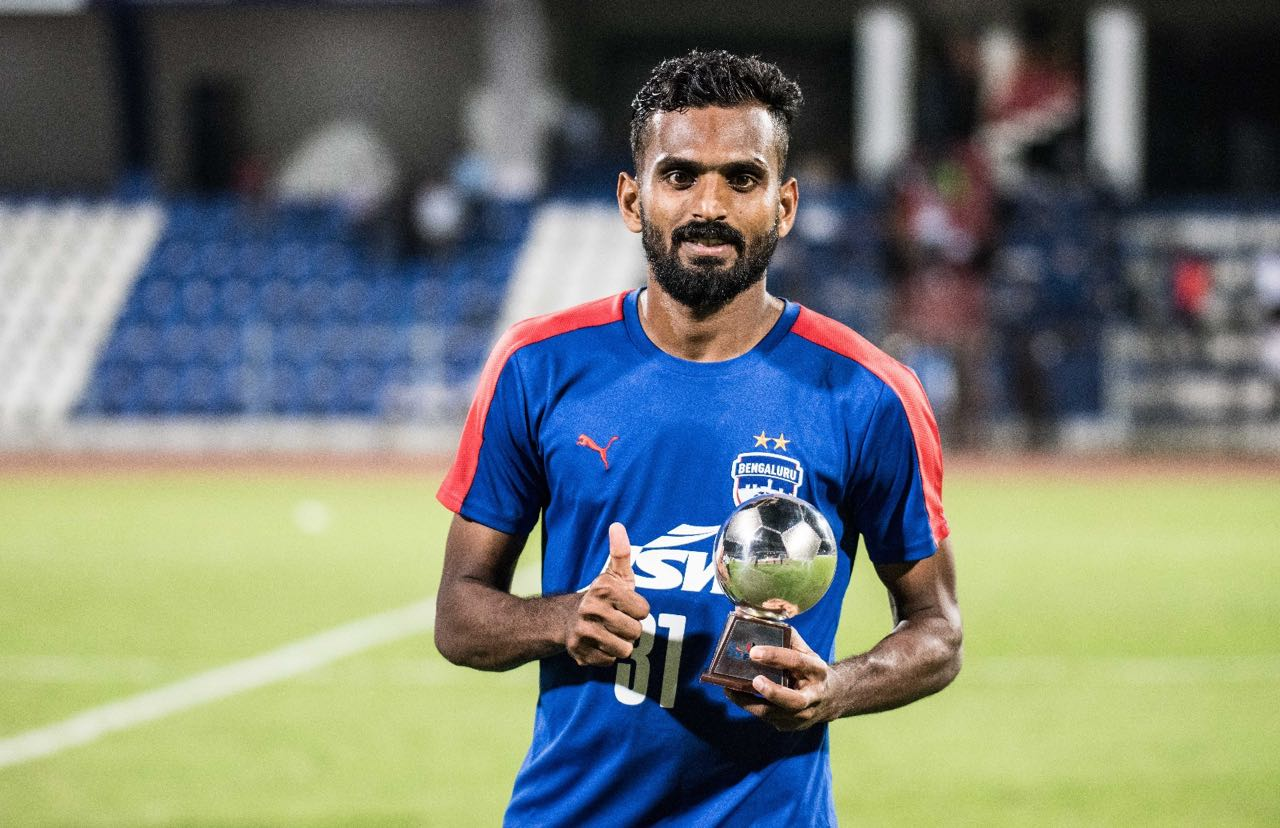
- Vineeth with Bengaluru FC

Personal information
- Full name: Chekiyot Kizhakkeveettill Vineeth
- Date of birth: 20 May 1988 (age 38)
- Place of birth: Vengad, Kannur district, Kerala, India
- Height: 1.76 m (5 ft 9 1/2 in)
- Positions: Striker; winger

Youth career
- Chennai Customs
- KSEB Football Team

Senior career*
Years	Team	Apps	(Gls)
2011–2012	Chirag United	21	(8)
2012–2014	Prayag United	37	(13)
2014	→ Bengaluru (loan)	7	(0)
2014–2017	Bengaluru	84	(21)
2015	→ Kerala Blasters (loan)	19	(0)
2016	→ Kerala Blasters (loan)	19	(5)
2017–2019	Kerala Blasters	15	(4)
2019	→ Chennaiyin (loan)	6	(1)
2019–2020	Jamshedpur	10	(1)
2020–2021	East Bengal		
2021–2022	RoundGlass Punjab	2	(1)
2024	Thrissur Magic	6	(0)

International career
2013–2017	India	7	(0)
- * Club domestic league appearances and goals

Chekiyot Kizhakkeveettill Vineeth (born 20 May 1988), commonly known as C. K. Vineeth, is a former Indian professional footballer who played as a forward.

== Personal life ==
Born at Vengad in Kannur district in the state of Kerala, he studied in Jawahar Navodaya Vidyalaya Kasaragod and the S. N. College, Kannur.

== Club career ==
=== Chirag United Kerala ===
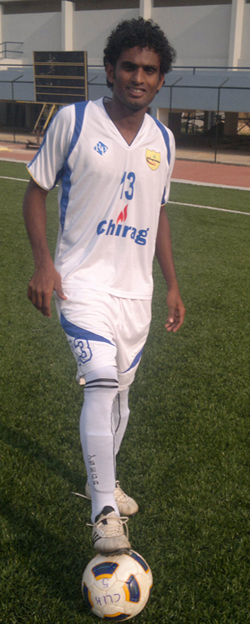
Vineeth with Chirag United

Vineeth made his debut for Chirag United Kerala in the I-League during the 2010–11 season after starting his amateur career with Chennai Customs and Kerala State Electricity. He scored the first professional goal of his career on his debut. During the 2011–12 season, Vineeth scored eight goals for Chirag Kerala.

=== United Sports Club ===
Before the 2012–13 season, Vineeth signed for United SC (then Prayag United) of the I-League. Vineeth made his debut for the club on 7 October 2012 against Air India. He played 82 minutes and scored a goal as United SC won, 5–1. Vineeth scored a hat-trick later that season against Air India on 2 February 2013 as United SC won 4–1. Vineeth went on to score seven goals that season, the most among all Indian players.

=== Bengaluru FC ===
On 30 January 2014, it was announced that Vineeth had been released by United SC due to financial difficulties and then signed for Bengaluru FC, the new direct-entry I-League side, for the remainder of the season. In his debut season with the club, he won the I-League, as the club was declared winner after defeating Dempo.

Bengaluru would extend his contract after an impressive half season. He signed a two-year contract with Bengaluru at the end of the season 2014–15 season, which would keep him at the club until the end of the 2016–17 I-League season. He was with the team when they won their maiden Federation Cup title.

In 2015-16 I-League season, he scored 4 times in the league, thus helping his team win the league title for the second time in 3 years.

His brace against Mohun Bagan in the finals of 2016-17 Federation Cup final won his team their second title in 4 years.

=== Kerala Blasters ===
In July 2015 Vineeth was drafted to play for Kerala Blasters FC in the 2015 Indian Super League. However, he had a poor season as he was hardly chosen, and Kerala Blasters ended up last in the table. In 2016, Vineeth could only start playing for the Blasters in the eighth game as he was playing the AFC Cup with Bengaluru FC. He had his first appearance as an 85th-minute substitute against FC Goa, where he scored a 95th-minute winner to help the team record a 2–1 win against FC Goa. In his next match, he scored 2 goals in the 85th and 87th minute respectively to help Blasters win against Chennaiyin FC 3–1. Vineeth scored several crucial goals to guide his team to the finals, where they were defeated by Atletico de Kolkata on penalties. He ended the campaign as the top Indian goalscorer with 5 goals from 9 matches.

==== 2017–2018 ====
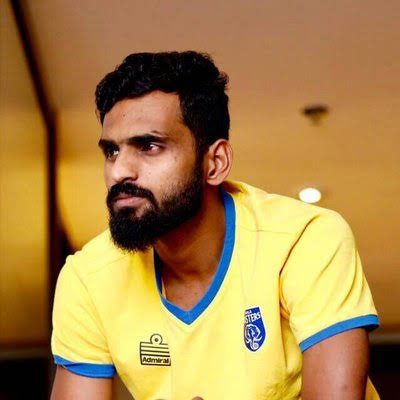
Vineeth with Blasters in 2017

On 5 July 2017 it was announced that Vineeth had been retained by the Kerala Blasters for the 2017–18 ISL season. He made his first appearance for the club during the first match of the season against ATK on 17 November 2017. Vineeth started and played 80 minutes as the match ended 0–0. On 3 December 2017, in the team's third match of the season against Mumbai City, Vineeth was sent off after being issued two yellow cards within nine minutes. On his return from suspension, Vineeth scored the only goal in a 1–0 victory for the Kerala Blasters over NorthEast United.

=== Chennaiyin FC (loan) ===
Vineeth later moved to Chennaiyin FC on loan from Kerala Blasters and also participated in the AFC Cup 2019. Vineeth made 13 appearances for Chennayin, including 7 in the AFC Cup 2019. He also played in the Hero Super Cup 2019 final against FC Goa, which he lost 2–1.

=== East Bengal ===
In May 2020, Vineeth shifted his base from Jamshedpur to East Bengal.

== International ==
Vineeth made his international debut for India on 6 February 2013 against Palestine in an international friendly, coming on as an 85th-minute substitute for Clifford Miranda as India lost 4–2.

== Career statistics ==
=== Club ===
As of 15 March 2022

Club	Season	League			Federation Cup/Super Cup		Durand Cup		AFC		Total	
Club	Season	Division	Apps	Goals	Apps	Goals	Apps	Goals	Apps	Goals	Apps	Goals
Chirag Kerala	2011-12	I-League	21	8	0	0	—	—	—	—	21	8
Prayag United	2012–13	I-League	23	7	0	0	—	—	—	—	23	7
Prayag United	2013–14	I-League	14	2	0	0	—	—	—	—	14	2
Prayag United	Prayag United total		37	9	0	0	0	0	0	0	37	9
Bengaluru (loan)	2013–14	I-League	7	0	0	0	—	—	—	—	7	0
Bengaluru	2014–15	I-League	18	3	3	0	3	0	5	1	29	4
Bengaluru	2015–16	I-League	14	4	2	1	—	—	4	2	20	7
Bengaluru	2016–17	I-League	15	7	3	2	—	—	10	1	28	10
Bengaluru	Bengaluru total		54	14	8	3	3	0	19	4	84	21
Kerala Blasters (loan)	2015	Indian Super League	9	0	—	—	—	—	—	—	9	0
Kerala Blasters (loan)	2016	Indian Super League	9	5	—	—	—	—	—	—	9	5
Kerala Blasters	2017–18	Indian Super League	14	4	1	0	—	—	—	—	15	4
Kerala Blasters	2018–19	Indian Super League	10	2	0	0	—	—	—	—	10	2
Kerala Blasters	Kerala Blasters total		42	11	1	0	0	0	0	0	43	11
Chennaiyin (loan)	2018–19	Indian Super League	6	1	5	2	—	—	7	1	18	4
Jamshedpur	2019–20	Indian Super League	10	1	0	0	—	—	—	—	10	1
East Bengal	2020–21	Indian Super League	2	0	0	0	—	—	—	—	2	0
RoundGlass Punjab	2021–22	I-League	2	1	0	0	—	—	—	—	2	1
Career total			174	45	14	5	3	0	26	5	218	55

=== International stats ===
Statistics accurate as of match played 17 February 2014

India national team
Year	Apps	Goals
2013	3	0
2015	3	0
2017	1	0
Total	7	0

== Honours ==
=== Club ===
Bengaluru FC

- I-League: Winner (2) : 2013–14, 2015—16
- Federation Cup: Winner (2) : 2014–15 2016-17

Kerala Blasters FC

- Indian Super League: Runner-up (1) : 2016

Chennaiyin FC

- Super Cup: Runner-up (1) : 2019
