= Alwyn George =

Indian footballer (born 1992)

Personal information
- Date of birth: 1 March 1992 (age 34)
- Place of birth: Nagpur, Maharashtra, India
- Height: 1.73 m (5 ft 8 in)
- Position: Attacking midfielder

Team information
- Current team: NorthEast United
- Number: 12

Youth career
- 2008–2011: Tata Football Academy

Senior career*
| Years | Team | Apps | (Gls) |
| 2011–2013 | Pailan Arrows | 32 | (5) |
| 2013–2015 | Dempo | 34 | (2) |
| 2014 | → Goa (loan) | 1 | (0) |
| 2015– | Bengaluru FC | 21 | (1) |
| 2016 | → Delhi Dynamos (loan) | 3 | (0) |
| 2018—2019 | Pune City | 3 | (0) |
| 2020– | Punjab | 1 | (0) |

International career^{‡}
| 2012 | India U23 | 4 | (4) |
| 2012– | India | 8 | (1) |
- * Club domestic league appearances and goals as of 03:50, 11 November 2018 (UTC) ‡ National team caps and goals as of 18:05, 7 June 2015 (UTC)

Alwyn George is an Indian footballer who plays as an attacking midfielder for NorthEast United in the Indian Super League.

== Career ==
=== Pailan Arrows ===
Alwyn started his football career with Tata Football Academy in 2008 and won the Junior National Championship with Tata FA in 2008, beating Sporting Goa youth 3–1. After spending four years at Tata, Alwyn signed his first professional contract with Pailan Arrows in the I-League on 11 February 2012. The next day, Alwyn made his debut in the I-League against Dempo in a game which the Arrows lost 2–0 but with Alwyn putting in a man of the match performance for his team.

Alwyn scored his first goal of the 2012–13 season against ONGC on 1 December 2012 to help Pailan win 4–1. On 6 April 2013, he headed in a cross from the left by Seminlen Doungel in the 74th minute to complete a 2–0 upset of defending champions Dempo at the Tilak Maidan Stadium.

=== Dempo ===
On 26 October 2013 it was confirmed that George has signed for Dempo on loan from IMG Reliance with three other players - Holicharan Narzary, Pronay Halder and Narayan Das. He made his debut for Dempo in the I-League on 1 November 2013 against Mohun Bagan at the Duler Stadium in which he came on as a substitute for Peter Carvalho in the 46th minute as Dempo drew the match 0–0. On 29 April, Alwyn was named best young Indian player of the season for a second year running.

Alwyn represented FC Goa during the 2014 Indian Super League on loan from parent club Dempo but was used sparingly.

=== Bengaluru FC ===
On 29 July 2015 former I-League champions Bengaluru FC announced the signing of Alwyn. Alwyn will be part of blue brigade who are eager to repeat the success that they achieved in their first season. Due to his impressive performance at domestic as well as Continental competitions, Club and the player decided to extend the contract further for a year

== International ==
Alwyn was called for India U23 team in June 2012, for the 2013 AFC U-22 Asian Cup qualifiers held from 23 June 2012. He played his first game for under-23 team against Lebanon U23 on 23 June 2012 in the opening group match of AFC U-22 qualification. India U23 won the match 5–2 with Alwyn scoring twice in the 38th and 54th minute. He then scored the only goal for India U23 during the second match AFC U-22 qualification against Iraq U23 on 25 June 2012 as India U23 lost 1–2. George was suspended for India U23's next match against United Arab Emirates U23 due to picking up two yellow cards (one against Lebanon U23 and one against Iraq U23). He returned for India U23s match against Turkmenistan U23 on 30 June 2012 and once again he scored in the 67th minute as India U23 won the match 4–1.

== Career statistics ==
=== Club ===
Statistics accurate as of 4 August 2017

| Club | Season | League | | | Federation Cup | | Durand Cup | | AFC | | Total | |
| Club | Season | Division | Apps | Goals | Apps | Goals | Apps | Goals | Apps | Goals | Apps | Goals |
|---|---|---|---|---|---|---|---|---|---|---|---|---|
| Pailan Arrows | 2011–12 | I-League | 7 | 2 | 0 | 0 | 0 | 0 | — | — | 7 | 2 |
| Pailan Arrows | 2012–13 | I-League | 25 | 3 | 1 | 0 | 0 | 0 | — | — | 26 | 3 |
| Dempo | 2013–14 | I-League | 18 | 1 | 4 | 1 | 0 | 0 | — | — | 22 | 2 |
| Dempo | 2014–15 | I-League | 16 | 1 | 5 | 0 | 0 | 0 | — | — | 21 | 1 |
| Goa (loan) | 2014 | Indian Super League | 1 | 0 | — | — | — | — | — | — | 1 | 0 |
| Bengaluru FC | 2015–16 | I-League | 6 | 0 | 2 | 0 | 0 | 0 | 10 | 2 | 18 | 2 |
| Bengaluru FC | 2016–17 | I-League | 11 | 1 | 4 | 0 | 0 | 0 | 4 | 0 | 19 | 2 |
| Bengaluru FC | 2017–18 | Indian Super League | 4 | 0 | — | — | — | — | — | — | 4 | 0 |
| Delhi Dynamos (loan) | 2016 | Indian Super League | 3 | 0 | — | — | — | — | — | — | 3 | 0 |
| Career Total | | | 91 | 8 | 16 | 1 | 0 | 0 | 14 | 2 | 121 | 11 |

== Honours ==
India

- SAFF Championship runner-up: 2013
- Nehru Cup: 2012

Individual

- Football Players' Association of India Emerging Player of the Season: 2012–13, 2013–14
