= Cameron Watson (soccer) =

Scottish Australian soccer player

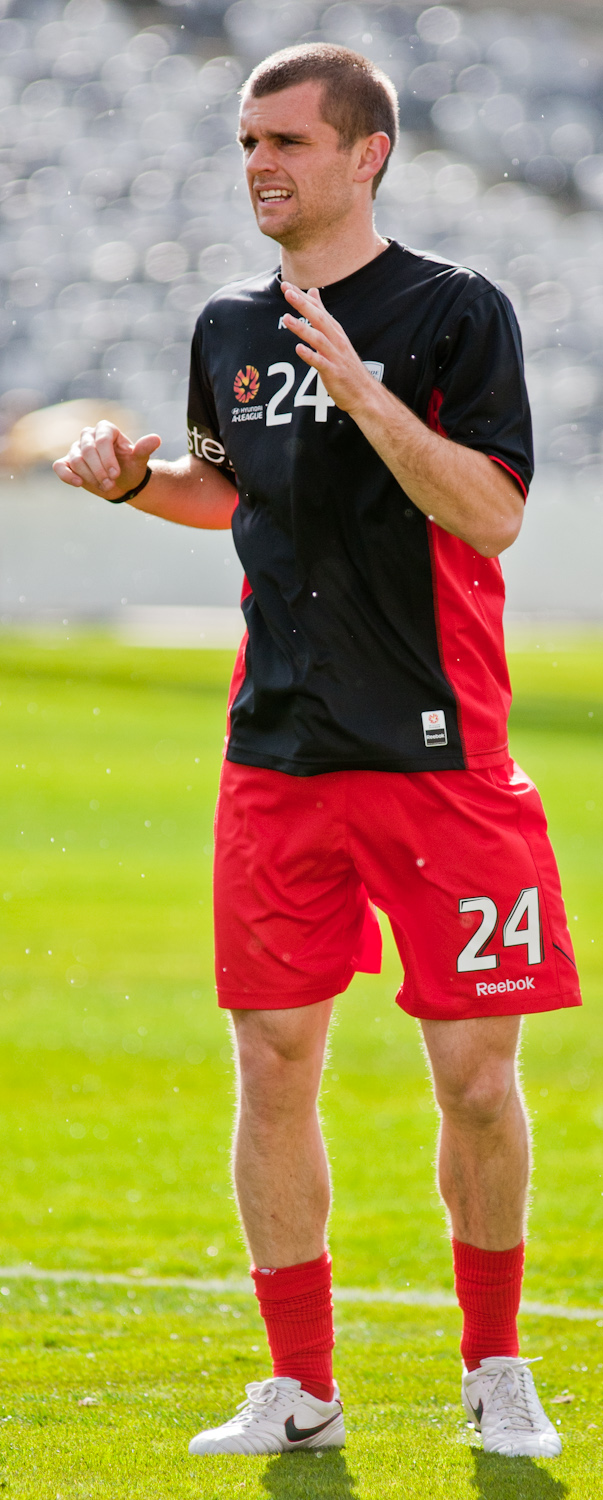
- Watson warming up before a game with Adelaide United in 2010

Personal information
- Full name: Cameron Alexander John Watson
- Date of birth: 31 May 1987 (age 39)
- Place of birth: Melbourne, Australia
- Height: 1.84 m (6 ft 1/2 in)
- Positions: Defensive midfielder; defender

Youth career
- Bulleen Zebras
- 2003–2004: VIC
- 2004–2005: AIS
- 2005–2006: Porto

Senior career*
Years	Team	Apps	(Gls)
2006–2007	VVV-Venlo	4	(0)
2007–2009	Melbourne Knights	42	(8)
2010	Oakleigh Cannons	18	(0)
2010	→ Adelaide United (loan)	28	(0)
2011–2015	Adelaide United	102	(1)
2015–2016	Newcastle Jets	17	(0)
2016–2017	Bengaluru FC	16	(0)
2017	Madura United	2	(0)
2017–2018	Mohun Bagan	10	(0)
2019–2022	Moreland Zebras	42	(4)
Total		281	(13)

International career
2003	Australia U-17	2	(0)
2005–2006	Australia U-20	5	(0)

Managerial career
- 2023–2024: Hume City
- 2024–: St Albans Dinamo
- * Club domestic league appearances and goals

Cameron Watson (born 31 May 1987) is a Scottish Australian former football (soccer) player who played as a defensive midfielder.

== Club career ==
=== FC Porto and VVV-Venlo ===
Watson previously played in the youth and reserve teams of Portuguese Liga club FC Porto for one season before joining Dutch club VVV-Venlo, where he made a handful of appearances. From there he trained with both Melbourne Victory and Sydney FC in an intention to sign with either club before signing on with Melbourne Knights. Watson was linked to a move to Gold Coast United after head coach, Miron Bleiberg, expressed his interest in signing him. Did not sign for Gold Coast United due to an injury. On 28 April 2010 he scored for Melbourne Heart in a team of trialists against the Whittlesea Zebras.

=== Adelaide United ===
Watson signed for Adelaide United in the A-League on an injury replacement loan for Fabian Barbiero. He played his first match in round 1 of the 2010–2011 A-League season coming on as a substitute.

Watson signed a permanent 2-year undisclosed contract with Adelaide United in January 2011, taking him to the end of the 2012–2013 A-League season.

At the conclusion of the 2014–2015 A-League season, Watson's contract was not renewed.

=== Newcastle Jets ===
On 24 July 2015, Watson signed a 1-year deal with the Newcastle Jets. He was released by the Newcastle Jets at the conclusion of his contract in April 2016.

=== Bengaluru FC ===
On 5 August 2016, Watson joined I-League champions Bengaluru FC.

=== Mohun Bagan A.C ===
On 18 December 2017, Watson joined Mohun Bagan. He replaced his fellow countryman Diogo Ferreira who was released by the club recently.

== Personal life ==
Cameron Watson's father, George Watson, previously played with Stirling Albion in the Scottish First Division before emigrating to Australia in the early 1980s.
