= 2016–17 Indian Federation Cup =

38th edition of the Federation Cup

2017 Federation Cup
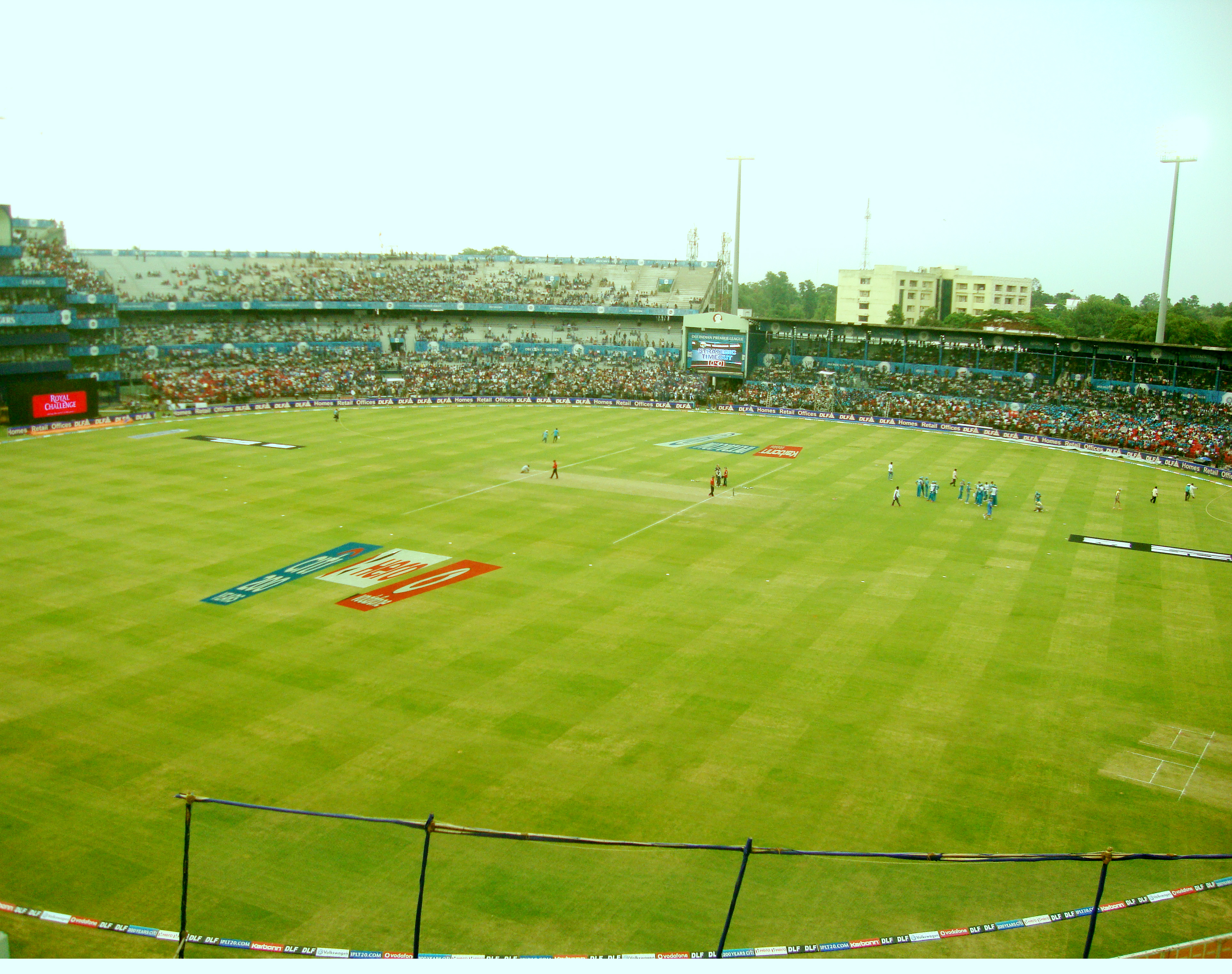
- Barabati Stadium hosted the final on 21 May 2017

Tournament details
- Country: India
- Dates: 7–21 May 2017
- Teams: 8

Final positions
- Champions: Bengaluru FC (2nd title)
- Runners-up: Mohun Bagan

Tournament statistics
- Matches played: 15
- Goals scored: 44 (2.93 per match)
- Top goal scorer(s): Balwant Singh (Mohun Bagan); Darryl Duffy (Mohun Bagan); Laldanmawia Ralte (Aizawl) (3 goals)

Awards
- Best player: Sony Norde (Mohun Bagan)

The 2016–17 Indian Federation Cup was the 38th and last edition of the Federation Cup, the main domestic football cup competition in India. From next season, a reformed Super Cup will take place. The top eight teams from the 2016–17 I-League season participated in the tournament hosted solely in Cuttack, Odisha. The tournament is set to take place between 7 May to 21 May 2017. Mohun Bagan are the defending champions.

Unlike the previous season of the tournament which was held on a home–away basis, this edition will revert to the previous format in which one venue hosts the entire tournament.

== Round and dates ==
Round	Match dates	Teams
Group stage	7 May 2017 – 12 May 2017	8
Semi-finals	14 May 2017	4
Final	18/21 May 2017	2

Locations of the 2016–17 Federation Cup teams

== Teams ==
The following teams qualified for the Federation Cup through ending in the top eight during the 2016–17 I-League:

- Aizawl
- Bengaluru FC
- Chennai City
- Churchill Brothers
- DSK Shivajians
- East Bengal
- Mohun Bagan
- Shillong Lajong

== Group stage ==
Tiebreakers
The teams are ranked according to points (3 points for a win, 1 point for a draw, 0 points for a loss). If two or more teams are equal on points on completion of the group matches, the following criteria are applied in the order given to determine the rankings (regulations Article 2.3):
1. higher number of points obtained in the group matches played among the teams in question;
2. superior goal difference from the group matches;
3. higher number of goals scored in the group matches;
4. drawing lots

Group A
Pos	Team	Pld	W	D	L	GF	GA	GD	Pts	Qualification
1	Aizawl	3	2	1	0	5	3	+2	7	Advance to semi-finals
2	East Bengal	3	1	2	0	3	1	+2	5	Advance to semi-finals
3	Chennai City	3	1	0	2	5	6	−1	3	
4	Churchill Brothers	3	0	1	2	3	6	−3	1	

Source: AIFF

Group B
Pos	Team	Pld	W	D	L	GF	GA	GD	Pts	Qualification
1	Mohun Bagan	3	2	1	0	8	3	+5	7	Advance to semi-finals
2	Bengaluru FC	3	1	1	1	4	5	−1	4	Advance to semi-finals
3	Shillong Lajong	3	1	0	2	7	8	−1	3	
4	DSK Shivajians	3	1	0	2	4	7	−3	3	

Source: AIFF

== Bracket ==
Semi-Finals
Aizawl	0
Bengaluru FC	1
Mohun Bagan	2
East Bengal	0

Final
Bengaluru FC	2
Mohun Bagan	0

== Semi-finals ==
14 May 2017
16:00 IST

Aizawl	0–1	Bengaluru FC
	Report	Watson 8' (pen.)

Barabati Stadium, Cuttack
14 May 2017
19:00 IST

Mohun Bagan	2–0	East Bengal
Duffy 35'; B.Singh 84'	Report

Barabati Stadium, Cuttack

== Final ==
21 May 2017
19:00 IST

Bengaluru FC	2–0 (a.e.t.)	Mohun Bagan
C.K. Vineeth 107', 119'	Report

Barabati Stadium, Cuttack

== Goal scorers ==
As of 21 May 2017

3 goals:

- (Scotland) Darryl Duffy (Mohun Bagan)
- (India) Laldanmawia Ralte (Aizawl)
- (India) Balwant Singh (Mohun Bagan)

2 goals:

- (Japan) Yuta Kinowaki (Shillong Lajong)
- (Liberia) Ansumana Kromah (Churchill Brothers)
- (India) Samuel Lalmuanpuia (Shillong Lajong)
- (India) Holicharan Narzary (DSK Shivajians)
- (Haiti) Sony Norde (Mohun Bagan)
- (Spain) Juan Quero (DSK Shivajians)
- (India) Robin Singh (East Bengal)
- (Brazil) Charles de Souza (Chennai City)
- (India) Edwin Vanspaul (Chennai City)
- (India) C.K. Vineeth (Bengaluru FC)

1 goal:

- (Syria) Mahmoud Amnah (Aizawl)
- (Haiti) Wedson Anselme (East Bengal)
- (India) Alen Deory (Shillong Lajong)
- (India) Brandon Fernandes (Churchill Brothers)
- (India) Dhanpal Ganesh (Chennai City)
- (India) Alwyn George (Bengaluru FC)
- (India) Jeje Lalpekhlua (Mohun Bagan)
- (India) Lalramchullova (Aizawl)
- (India) Eugeneson Lyngdoh (Bengaluru FC)
- (India) Udanta Singh (Bengaluru FC)
- (India) Redeem Tlang (Shillong Lajong)
- (Australia) Cameron Watson (Bengaluru)
- (Japan) Katsumi Yusa (Mohun Bagan)

Own goals:

- (India) Aiborlang Khongjee (Shillong Lajong) (playing against Bengaluru FC)

== Hero of the Match ==
As of 21 May 2017

Round	Hero of the Matches			
Group stage	(Haiti) Wedson Anselme	(India) Laldanmawia Ralte	(India) Udanta Singh	(India) Balwant Singh
Group stage	(India) Robin Singh	(India) Lalruatthara	(Spain) Juan Quero	(Haiti) Sony Norde
Group stage	(India) Dhanpal Ganesh	(India) Bikash Jairu	(India) Samuel Lalmuanpuia	(India) Raju Gaikwad
Semi finals	(England) John Johnson		(India) Debjit Majumder	
Final	(India) Amrinder Singh			
