= 2023–24 East Bengal FC season =

Indian football club season

East Bengal
2023–24 season
- Owner: Emami East Bengal FC Pvt. Ltd.
- Head coach: Carles Cuadrat
- Stadium: Salt Lake Stadium; East Bengal Ground
- Indian Super League: 9th
- Calcutta League: Runners-up
- Durand Cup: Runners-up
- Super Cup: Champions
- Top goalscorer: League: Cleiton Silva (8 goals); All: Cleiton Silva (13 goals)
- Highest home attendance: 59,845 vs Mohun Bagan SG (10 March 2024, ISL)
- Lowest home attendance: 1,500 vs Goa (21 October 2023, ISL)
- Average home league attendance: 16,285
- Biggest win: 10–1 Kidderpore (26 September 2023, CFL)
- Biggest defeat: 1–4 Punjab (10 April 2024, ISL)
Home colours	Away colours	Third colours

The 2023–24 season is the 104th season of East Bengal Football Club and their fourth season in the Indian Super League, the top flight of Indian football. The Indian football season started in July and ended in April. During the season, East Bengal became runners-up in the Durand Cup and runners-up in the Calcutta Football League, had a ninth-place finish in the Indian Super League and became champions of the Super Cup, thus ensuring a place in the 2024–25 AFC Champions League 2 qualifiers.

Before the start of the season, East Bengal appointed Carles Cuadrat as the new head coach and finished with the highest ever points the club amassed in the Indian Super League in the four seasons.

== Background ==
After the end of the 2022–23 season, the club parted ways with the head coach Stephen Constantine after poor results, and appointed former Indian Super League winner Carles Cuadrat as the new head coach for the team on a two-year contract. The club also roped in the services of Odisha winger Nandhakumar Sekar and Chennaiyin midfielder Edwin Sydney Vanspaul for the season. The club also roped in three Spaniards – Javier Siverio and Borja Herrera from Hyderabad, and Saúl Crespo from Odisha for the season. On 3 June, East Bengal announced the departure of eleven players, whose contract period ended and were not renewed, which included the five foreign players from last season apart from Cleiton Silva and Indian players – Jerry Lalrinzuala, Semboi Haokip, Suvam Sen, Himanshu Jangra, Amarjit Singh Kiyam and Naveen Kumar. East Bengal also roped in club legend Harmanjot Singh Khabra who had spent seven years with the club previously from 2009–2016 and also left back Mandar Rao Dessai for the season.

On 10 June, the club announced the signing of Nandhakumar Sekar on a three-year deal on a free transfer from Odisha. On 12 June, East Bengal announced the signing of Spanish midfielder Borja Herrera on a one-year contract in a free transfer. On 14 June, the club announced the signing of defender Nishu Kumar from Kerala Blasters on a one-year loan deal. On 17 June, the club announced the signing of Spanish duo Javier Siverio and Saúl Crespo on a one-year contract. On 19 June, the club announced the signings of three players – Edwin Sydney Vanspaul, Harmanjot Singh Khabra and Mandar Rao Dessai.

== Transfers ==
=== Incoming ===
Date	No.	Pos.	Name	Signed from	Fee	Ref
10 June 2023	11	FW	(India) Nandhakumar Sekar	(India) Odisha	Free Transfer	
12 June 2023	26	MF	(Spain) Borja Herrera	(India) Hyderabad	Free Transfer	
17 June 2023	99	FW	(Spain) Javier Siverio	(India) Hyderabad	Free Transfer	
17 June 2023	21	MF	(Spain) Saúl Crespo	(India) Odisha	Free Transfer	
19 June 2023	8	MF	(India) Edwin Sydney Vanspaul	(India) Chennaiyin	Free Transfer	
19 June 2023	7	DF	(India) Harmanjot Khabra	(India) Kerala Blasters	Free Transfer	
19 June 2023	17	DF	(India) Mandar Rao Dessai	(India) Mumbai City	Free Transfer	
12 July 2023	13	GK	(India) Prabhsukhan Singh Gill	(India) Kerala Blasters	Undisclosed (Note: Reported as ₹1.5 Crores transfer fees given to Kerala Blasters.)	
12 July 2023	33	DF	(India) Gursimrat Singh Gill	(India) Mumbai City	Free Transfer	
21 July 2023	30	MF	(India) Vanlalpeka Guite	(India) Aizawl	Free Transfer	
21 July 2023	35	MF	(India) Gurnaj Singh Grewal	(India) Chandigarh Football Academy	Free Transfer	
5 August 2023	44	DF	(Australia) Jordan Elsey	(Australia) Perth Glory	Free Transfer	
5 August 2023	4	DF	(Spain) José Antonio Pardo Lucas	(Spain) Eldense	Free Transfer	
1 September 2023	84	MF	(India) Sayan Banerjee	(India) Kalighat Milan Sangha	Free Transfer	
2 September 2023	50	GK	(India) Julfikar Gazi	(India) Bengal Football Academy	Free Transfer	
28 September 2023	19	DF	(Jordan) Hijazi Maher	(Jordan) Al-Hussein	Free Transfer	
31 January 2024	9	MF	(Spain) Víctor Vázquez	(United States) Toronto FC	Free Transfer	
1 February 2024	91	FW	(Costa Rica) Felicio Brown	(China) Qingdao Hainiu	Free Transfer	
15 February 2024	28	DF	(Serbia) Aleksandar Pantić	(Cyprus) Doxa Katokopias	Free Transfer	

=== Loan in ===
Start date	End date	No.	Pos.	Name	Loaned from	Ref
14 June 2023	End of season	22	DF	(India) Nishu Kumar	(India) Kerala Blasters	
31 August 2023	End of season	6	MF	(India) Ajay Chhetri	(India) Bengaluru	

=== Outgoing ===
Exit Date	No.	Pos.	Name	Signed to	Fee	Ref
1 June 2023	6	FW	(India) Sumit Passi	(India) Inter Kashi	Free Transfer	
1 June 2023	8	MF	(India) Amarjit Singh Kiyam	(India) Goa	End of Loan	
1 June 2023	14	MF	(Brazil) Alex Lima		Released	
1 June 2023	17	DF	(India) Jerry Lalrinzuala	(India) Odisha	Free Transfer	
1 June 2023	18	MF	(India) Himanshu Jangra	(India) Delhi	End of Loan	
1 June 2023	24	MF	(Australia) Jordan O'Doherty		Released	
1 June 2023	25	GK	(India) Suvam Sen		Released	
1 June 2023	26	FW	(India) Semboi Haokip	(India) Jamshedpur	Free Transfer	
1 June 2023	32	GK	(India) Naveen Kumar	(India) Goa	End of Loan	
1 June 2023	40	DF	(Cyprus) Charalambos Kyriakou	(Cyprus) Doxa Katokopias	Free Transfer	
1 June 2023	77	FW	(England) Jake Jervis	(Finland) Kuopion Palloseura	Free Transfer	
26 July 2023	12	MF	(India) Wahengbam Angousana	(India) Mohammedan Sporting	Free Transfer	
26 July 2023	13	GK	(India) Pawan Kumar	(India) Delhi	Free Transfer	
1 September 2023	4	DF	(Spain) Iván González	(Nepal) Chitwan	Free Transfer	
1 September 2023	33	DF	(India) Pritam Kumar Singh	(India) TRAU	Free Transfer	

=== Loan out ===
Start date	End date	No.	Pos.	Name	Loaned to	Ref
25 August 2023	End of season	16	DF	(India) Sarthak Golui	(India) Chennaiyin	
8 January 2024	End of season	15	MF	(India) Mobashir Rahman	(India) Chennaiyin	
30 January 2024	End of season	26	MF	(Spain) Borja Herrera	(India) Goa	
31 January 2024	End of season	99	FW	(Spain) Javier Siverio	(India) Jamshedpur	

== Team ==
=== First-team squad ===
The below list contains the names and details of the first team squad for East Bengal.

As of till the end of 2023–24 season.

No.	Name	Nat.	Pos.	Date of Birth (Age)	Signed From	Signed In	Contact Ends	Apps	Goals
Goalkeepers
1	Kamaljit Singh	(India)	GK	28 December 1995 (age 30)	(India) Odisha	2022	2025	26	0
13	Prabhsukhan Singh Gill	(India)	GK	2 January 2001 (age 25)	(India) Kerala Blasters	2023	2026	32	0
27	Aditya Patra	(India)	GK	27 April 2000 (age 26)	(India) East Bengal Reserves	2022	2024	9	0
50	Julfikar Gazi	(India)	GK	6 May 2006 (age 20)	(India) Bengal FA	2023	2026	0	0
75	Ranit Sarkar	(India)	GK	9 November 2004 (age 22)	(India) RFYC	2023	2026	1	0
Defenders
5	Lalchungnunga	(India)	CB	25 December 2000 (age 25)	(India) Sreenidi Deccan	2022	2026	50	0
7	Harmanjot Singh Khabra	(India)	RB	18 March 1988 (age 38)	(India) Kerala Blasters	2023	2024	246	13
12	Mohammad Rakip	(India)	RB	14 May 2000 (age 26)	(India) Mumbai City	2022	2024	48	0
17	Mandar Rao Dessai	(India)	LB	18 March 1992 (age 34)	(India) Mumbai City	2023	2024	24	0
19	Hijazi Maher	(Jordan)	CB	20 September 1997 (age 29)	(Jordan) Al-Hussein	2023	2024	22	2
22	Nishu Kumar	(India)	LB	5 November 1997 (age 29)	(India) Kerala Blasters	2023	2024	30	1
25	Athul Unnikrishnan	(India)	CB	1 February 2000 (age 26)	(India) Kerala United	2022	2025	16	0
28	Aleksandar Pantić	(Serbia)	CB	11 April 1992 (age 34)	(Cyprus) Doxa Katokopias	2024	2024	8	0
33	Gursimrat Singh Gill	(India)	CB	2 November 1997 (age 29)	(India) Mumbai City	2023	2026	11	0
37	Tuhin Das	(India)	LB	7 March 2000 (age 26)	(India) East Bengal Reserves	2022	2024	23	2
40	Tingku Kangujam	(India)	RB	23 January 2001 (age 25)	(India) NEROCA	2023	2024	0	0
Midfielders
6	Ajay Chhetri	(India)	CM	7 July 1999 (age 27)	(India) Bengaluru	2023	2024	21	1
8	Edwin Sydney Vanspaul	(India)	CM	24 September 1992 (age 34)	(India) Chennaiyin	2023	2025	13	0
9	Víctor Vázquez	(Spain)	AM	20 January 1987 (age 39)	(United States) Toronto FC	2024	2024	10	0
21	Saúl Crespo	(Spain)	DM	23 July 1996 (age 30)	(India) Odisha	2023	2024	25	7
23	Souvik Chakrabarti	(India)	CM	12 July 1991 (age 35)	(India) Hyderabad	2022	2025	42	0
29	Naorem Mahesh Singh	(India)	LW	1 March 1999 (age 27)	(India) Kerala Blasters	2022	2027	70	12
30	Vanlalpeka Guite	(India)	AM	26 October 2006 (age 20)	(India) Aizawl	2023	2026	8	1
35	Gunraj Singh Grewal	(India)	DM	9 January 2007 (age 19)	(India) Chandigarh FA	2023	2026	9	0
57	Mahitosh Roy	(India)	CM	11 November 1998 (age 28)	(India) East Bengal Reserves	2022	2024	12	5
61	Tanmay Das	(India)	CM	2 May 2001 (age 25)	(India) East Bengal Reserves	2022	2024	13	1
62	Aman C. K.	(India)	RW	19 March 2003 (age 23)	(India) East Bengal Reserves	2022	2026	15	5
66	Shyamal Besra	(India)	CM	25 September 2004 (age 22)	(India) East Bengal Reserves	2022	2024	7	1
Forwards
10	Cleiton Silva (captain)	(Brazil)	FW	3 February 1987 (age 39)	(India) Bengaluru	2022	2024	55	27
11	Nandhakumar Sekar	(India)	FW	20 December 1995 (age 30)	(India) Odisha	2023	2026	31	10
20	V. P. Suhair	(India)	FW	27 July 1992 (age 34)	(India) NorthEast United	2022	2025	45	10
59	Jesin TK	(India)	FW	19 February 2000 (age 26)	(India) East Bengal Reserves	2022	2024	17	7
70	Abhishek Kunjam	(India)	FW	17 August 2003 (age 23)	(India) RKM Football Academy	2023	2025	13	6
82	P. V. Vishnu	(India)	FW	24 December 2001 (age 24)	(India) Muthoot FA	2023	2026	31	7
84	Sayan Banerjee	(India)	FW	14 January 2003 (age 23)	(India) Kalighat MS	2023	2026	10	1
91	Felicio Brown Forbes	(Germany)	FW	28 August 1991 (age 35)	(China) Qingdao Hainiu	2024	2024	11	1

=== New contracts ===
No.	Pos.	Date	Name	Ref.
29	MF	23 September 2023	(India) Naorem Mahesh Singh	

=== Other player under contract ===
No.	Pos.	Name	Ref.
4	DF	(Spain) José Antonio Pardo Lucas	
44	DF	(Australia) Jordan Elsey	

=== Current technical staff ===
East Bengal appointed former Indian Super League winner Carles Cuadrat as the new head coach for the club on a two-year contract. The club also extended the contract with assistant coach Bino George till 2026, as he would also remain as the head coach of the reserves and developmental squad. The club also appointed former Indian Super League winner Dimas Delgado as the assistant coach on a two-year contract. The club also roped in three more Spaniards into the backroom – Goalkeeper coach Javier Pinillos, Physiotherapist Senen Alvarez and Sports Scientist Albert Martinez Bernat.

Position	Name
Head coach	(Spain) Carles Cuadrat
Assistant coach	(Spain) Dimas Delgado
Assistant coach	(India) Bino George
Goalkeeping Coach	(Spain) Javier Pinillos
Strength & Conditioning Coach	(Spain) Albert Martinez Bernat
Physiotherapist	(Spain) Senen Alvarez
Physical Rehabilitator	(Spain) Gabriel Effio
Assistant Physiotherapist	(India) Tejas Lasalkar
Performance Analyst	(India) Aromal Vijayan
Team Manager	(India) Pratim Kumar Saha
Team Doctor	(India) Dr. Mustufa Poonawalla
Masseur	(India) Rajesh Basak
Masseur	(India) Robin Das

== Preseason and friendlies ==
East Bengal started their preseason under Bino George and later under Carles Cuadrat in July. East Bengal played their first preseason friendly against Indian Navy on 30 July and won 2–1 with Lalchungnunga and Mandar Rao Dessai scoring for East Bengal in the match ahead of the Durand Cup. On 13 September, East Bengal faced Hyderabad in a preseason friendly game ahead of the Indian Super League and lost 0–1 at the East Bengal Ground.

=== Matches ===
Win Draw Loss

30 July 2023 Friendly	East Bengal	2–1	Indian Navy	Rajarhat
19:00 IST	Lalchungnunga 12'; Dessai 53'	Report	Mahata 60'	Stadium: AIFF National Centre of Excellence; Attendance: 0 (Note: Closed door friendly match.)

13 September 2023 Friendly	East Bengal	0–1	Hyderabad	Kolkata
17:00 IST		Report	Moya 20'	Stadium: East Bengal Ground; Attendance: 0

18 September 2023 Friendly	East Bengal	2–2	Inter Kashi	Kolkata
17:00 IST	Crespo; Silva		?; Asif	Stadium: East Bengal Ground; Attendance: 0

16 October 2023 Friendly	East Bengal	2–3	Neroca	Kolkata
12:00 IST	Vanlalpeka Guite (?); P. V. Vishnu (?)		Haidar Awada (?); Meitei (?)	Stadium: East Bengal Ground; Attendance: 0

26 October 2023 Friendly	East Bengal	0–0	Diamond Harbour	Kolkata
12:00 IST				Stadium: East Bengal Ground; Attendance: 0

30 October 2023 Friendly	East Bengal	4–0	Mohammedan Sporting	Kolkata
19:00 IST	Siverio; Pardo; Suhair; Kumar			Stadium: East Bengal Ground; Attendance: 0

16 November 2023 Friendly	East Bengal	2–1	TRAU	Kolkata
09:00 IST	Silva; Rahman		?	Stadium: East Bengal Ground; Attendance: 0

== Competitions ==
=== Overall record ===
Competition	First match	Last match	Starting round	Final position	Record							
Competition	First match	Last match	Starting round	Final position	Pld	W	D	L	GF	GA	GD	Win %
Durand Cup	12 August 2023	3 September 2023	Group stage	Runner-up	6	3	2	1	8	6	+2	50.00
Indian Super League	25 September 2023	10 April 2024	Matchday 1	9th	22	6	6	10	27	29	−2	27.27
Super Cup	9 January 2024	28 January 2024	Group stage	Winners	5	5	0	0	13	6	+7	100.00
Calcutta Football League (Note: East Bengal shall field mostly their Reserve team for the tournament, with Bino George taking charge as the head coach.) (Note: Includes 2 walkover wins against Bhawanipore and Mohun Bagan SG.)	13 July 2023	30 November 2023	Round Robin	Runner-up	17	13	3	1	50	10	+40	76.47
Total					50	27	11	12	98	51	+47	54.00

Last updated: 10 April 2024
Source: Soccerway

=== Durand Cup ===
East Bengal participated in the 2023 Durand Cup and was grouped into Group A along with Mohun Bagan SG, Punjab, and Bangladesh Army and would play their group stage matches in Kolkata. On 6 August, East Bengal began their campaign against Bangladesh Army at the Salt Lake Stadium and managed a 2–2 draw. East Bengal took a 2–0 lead at halftime with Saúl Crespo and Javier Siverio scoring for the team but Nishu Kumar received a red card in the second half as Bangladesh Army scored two late goals to make it 2–2 and the points were shared. On 12 August, East Bengal faced their arch—rivals Mohun Bagan SG in the Kolkata Derby fixture at the Salt Lake Stadium and managed a 1–0 win courtesy of a solitary goal from Nandhakumar Sekar in the second half. On 16 August, East Bengal defeated Punjab 1–0 at the Kishore Bharati Krirangan to secure the top spot in the group and qualify for the quarterfinals. Javier Siverio scored the only goal of the match. On 25 August, East Bengal faced Gokulam Kerala at the Salt Lake Stadium in the quarterfinals and won 2–1. Jordan Elsey scored for East Bengal in the very first minute but Gokulam Kerala equalized in the second half courtesy of a goal from Aminou Bouba. However, East Bengal found the winner in the seventy-eighth minute when Nishu Kumar's cross deflected off Aminou Bouba into the net as East Bengal managed to hold onto the 2–1 lead to progress into the semifinals. On 29 August, East Bengal faced NorthEast United in the semifinals at the Salt Lake Stadium, where after the match ended 2–2, East Bengal managed to progress into the finals after winning the penalty shootout 5–3. East Bengal went 2–0 behind with goals from Míchel Zabaco and Konsam Phalguni Singh however, they rallied from behind with goals from Naorem Mahesh Singh and Nandhakumar Sekar to equalize the match to take it to the penalty shootout. East Bengal scored all five of their penalty kicks but Parthib Sundar Gogoi missed the penalty for NorthEast United as East Bengal won the shootout and progressed into the final for the first time since 2004. On 3 September, East Bengal faced Mohun Bagan SG in the final at the Salt Lake Stadium and suffered a 0–1 defeat to finish runners-up of the tournament. Dimitri Petratos scored the only goal in the final for Mohun Bagan SG. Nandhakumar Sekar was adjudged as the player of the tournament.

==== Group stage ====
Pos	Team	Pld	W	D	L	GF	GA	GD	Pts	Qualification	EAB	MBG	(Bangladesh) BAN	PUN
1	East Bengal (H)	3	2	1	0	4	2	+2	7	Qualify for the knockout stage	—	—	2–2	1–0
2	Mohun Bagan (H)	3	2	0	1	7	1	+6	6	Qualify for the knockout stage	0–1	—	5–0	2–0
3	Bangladesh Army	3	0	2	1	2	7	−5	2		—	—	—	—
4	Punjab	3	0	1	2	0	3	−3	1		—	—	0–0	—

Source: Twitter
Rules for classification: Group stage tiebreakers
(H) Hosts

==== Knockout stage ====
Quarter-finals
24 August – Guwahati
Indian Army	0
NorthEast United	1
25 August – Kolkata
East Bengal	2
Gokulam Kerala	1
26 August – Guwahati
Goa	4
Chennaiyin	1
27 August – Kolkata
Mumbai City	1
Mohun Bagan	3

Semi-finals
29 August – Kolkata
NorthEast United	2(3)
East Bengal	2(5)
31 August – Kolkata
Goa	1
Mohun Bagan	2

Final
3 September – Kolkata
East Bengal	0
Mohun Bagan	1

==== Matches ====
Win Draw Loss Void

6 August 2023 Group stage	East Bengal	2–2	Bangladesh Army	Kolkata
16:45 IST	Siverio (yellow card) 6' (goal) 45+4'; Crespo 33' (pen.); Kumar (red card) 67'	Report	Emtiyaz Raihan (yellow card) 40'; Hasan Murad (yellow card) 64'; Emon 88'; Meraj Pradhan 90+7'	Stadium: Salt Lake Stadium; Attendance: 9,820; Referee: Ijamal Mohamed; Man of the Match: Harmanjot Khabra (East Bengal)

12 August 2023^{(KD)} Group stage	Mohun Bagan SG	0–1	East Bengal	Kolkata
16:45 IST		Report	Khabra (yellow card) 45+1'; Chakrabarti (yellow card) 51'; Sekar 60'; Gill (yellow card) 90+2'	Stadium: Salt Lake Stadium; Attendance: 55,857; Referee: Harish Kundu; Man of the Match: Nandhakumar Sekar (East Bengal)

16 August 2023 Group stage	East Bengal	1–0	Punjab	Kolkata
18:00 IST	Siverio 22'; Lalchungnunga (yellow card) 48'; Mahesh (yellow card) 58'	Report	Nikhil Prabhu N. (yellow card) 21'; Mera (yellow card) 23'; Melroy Melwin Assisi (yellow card) 50'	Stadium: Kishore Bharati Krirangan; Attendance: 8,000; Referee: Rahul Gupta; Man of the Match: Nandhakumar Sekar (East Bengal)

25 August 2023 Quarter—final	East Bengal	2–1	Gokulam Kerala	Kolkata
18:00 IST	Elsey 1'; Chakrabarti (yellow card) 26'; Herrera (yellow card) 27'; Bouba 78' (o.g.)	Report	Bhat (yellow card) 23'; Bouba 57' (yellow card) 71'	Stadium: Salt Lake Stadium; Attendance: 8,131; Referee: Harish Kundu; Man of the Match: Jordan Elsey (East Bengal)

29 August 2023 Semi—final	NorthEast United	2–2 (3–5 p)	East Bengal	Kolkata
18:00 IST	Philippoteaux (yellow card) 10'; Zabaco 22' (yellow card) 29' (yellow-red card) 90+6'; Dinesh (yellow card) 50'; Phalguni 57'; Parthib (yellow card) 89'	Report	Crespo (yellow card) 10'; Siverio (yellow card) 72'; Mahesh 77'; Chakrabarti (yellow card) 90+2'; Nandhakumar Sekar 90+7'	Stadium: Salt Lake Stadium; Attendance: 21,567; Referee: Aditya Purakayasta; Man of the Match: Nandhakumar Sekar (East Bengal)
	Penalties
	Melo (penalty scored); Nigam (penalty scored); Parthib (penalty missed); Pragyan (penalty scored)		(penalty scored) Silva; (penalty scored) Crespo; (penalty scored) Herrera; (penalty scored) Mahesh; (penalty scored) Sekar

3 September 2023^{(KD)} Final	East Bengal	0–1	Mohun Bagan SG	Kolkata
16:00 IST	Herrera (yellow card) 45+2'; Crespo (yellow card) 45+2'; Khabra (yellow card) 59'; Suhair (yellow card) 81'	Report	Boumous (yellow card) 45+2'; Thapa (yellow card) 45+3' (yellow-red card) 62'; Petratos 71'; Kaith (yellow card) 90+7'	Stadium: Salt Lake Stadium; Attendance: 59,797; Referee: Rahul Kumar Gupta; Man of the Match: Vishal Kaith (Mohun Bagan SG)

=== Indian Super League ===
==== Summary ====
East Bengal began their Indian Super League campaign at home against Jamshedpur on 25 September at the Salt Lake Stadium with a goalless draw to share the points. On 30 September, East Bengal faced Hyderabad in their second match at the Salt lake Stadium and secured their first victory of the campaign. Hitesh Sharma put Hyderabad ahead but Cleiton Silva scored twice including a stoppage-time freekick winner to complete the comeback as East Bengal secured the victory.

On 4 October, East Bengal faced Bengaluru away at the Sree Kanteerava Stadium and suffered a 2–1 defeat. Naorem Mahesh Singh had put East Bengal ahead but Sunil Chhetri and Javi Hernández scored for Bengaluru as East Bengal suffered their first defeat of the campaign. On 21 October, East Bengal faced Goa at the Kalinga Stadium in Bhubaneshwar due to administrative issues, and suffered a 2–1 defeat. Naorem Mahesh Singh had put East Bengal ahead however, Goa rallied from behind with two goals within a minute from Sandesh Jhingan and Víctor Rodríguez as East Bengal suffered consecutive defeats. On 4 November, East Bengal faced Kerala Blasters at the Salt Lake Stadium and suffered a 2&1 defeat. On 25 November, East Bengal faced Chennaiyin away at the Jawaharlal Nehru Stadium and drew 1–1, to end their three-match defeat streak.

On 4 December, East Bengal faced NorthEast United and recorded a 5–0 win. Borja Herrera opened the scoring for East Bengal and Cleiton Silva and Nandhakumar Sekar scored a brace each as East Bengal recorded their biggest-ever win since their inception in the Indian Super League. On 9 December, East Bengal faced Punjab and settled for a 0–0 draw. Next, on 16 December, East Bengal faced Mumbai City away at the Mumbai Football Arena and again settled for a 0–0 draw. On 22 December, East Bengal faced Odisha at home and once again settled for a 0–0 draw, the third consecutive goalless draw before ending the first leg of the league before the break for the Asian Cup.

==== League table ====
Pos	Team	Pld	W	D	L	GF	GA	GD	Pts	Qualification
7	NorthEast United	22	6	8	8	28	32	−4	26	
8	Punjab	22	6	6	10	28	35	−7	24 (Note: Head-to-head points: Punjab 4, East Bengal 1.)	
9	East Bengal	22	6	6	10	27	29	−2	24	Qualification for the Champions League Two preliminary stage (Note: East Bengal qualified for the AFC Champions League Two preliminary stage by winning the 2024 Super Cup.)
10	Bengaluru	22	5	7	10	20	34	−14	22	
11	Jamshedpur	22	5	6	11	27	32	−5	21	

Source: Indian Super League
Rules for classification: 1) points; 2) head-to-head points; 3) head-to-head goal difference; 4) head-to-head goals scored; 5) goal difference; 6) number of goals scored; 7) fair play ranking

==== Result summary ====
Overall								Home						Away					
Pld	W	D	L	GF	GA	GD	Pts	W	D	L	GF	GA	GD	W	D	L	GF	GA	GD
22	6	6	10	27	29	−2	24	4	3	4	13	10	+3	2	3	6	14	19	−5

==== Results by match ====
Match	1	2	3	4	5	6	7	8	9	10	11	12	13	14	15	16	17	18	19	20	21	22
Ground	H	H	A	H	H	A	H	H	A	H	A	A	H	A	A	H	A	A	H	A	H	A
Result	D	W	L	L	L	D	W	D	D	D	D	L	L	W	L	W	L	L	L	W	W	L
Position	5	4	5	8	10	9	7	6	7	7	7	9	10	8	8	8	8	9	10	7	6	8

Updated to match(es) played on 10 April 2024. Source: indiansuperleague.com
A = Away; H = Home; W = Win; D = Draw; L = Loss

==== Matches ====
The league fixtures were announced on 7 September 2023, with the season starting on 21 September.

Win Draw Loss Void

25 September 2023 Round 1	East Bengal	0–0	Jamshedpur	Kolkata
20:00 IST	Chakrabarti (yellow card) 30'; Crespo (yellow card) 90+6'	Report	Halder (yellow card) 26'; Naorem (yellow card) 41'; Nikhil Barla (yellow card) 80'; Benny (yellow card) 90+6'	Stadium: Salt Lake Stadium; Attendance: 11,143; Referee: I Jamal Mohamed; Man of the Match: Elsinho (Jamshedpur)

30 September 2023 Round 2	East Bengal	2–1	Hyderabad	Kolkata
20:00 IST	Silva 10', 90+3'; P. Gill (yellow card) 86'; Siverio (yellow card) 90+7'	Report	Sharma 8'; Tavora (yellow card) 54'; Mohammed (yellow card) 73'; Victor (yellow card) 86'; Aaren D'Silva (yellow card) 86'	Stadium: Salt Lake Stadium; Attendance: 11,577; Referee: Ashwin Kumar; Man of the Match: Cleiton Silva (East Bengal)

4 October 2023 Round 3	Bengaluru	2–1	East Bengal	Bengaluru
20:00 IST	Chhetri 21' (pen.); Damjanović (yellow card) 70'; Hernández 72'; F Lalremtluanga (yellow card) 90'; Rohit Kumar (yellow card) 90+7'	Report	Mahesh 15' (yellow card) 45+2'; Herrera (yellow card) 30'; Kumar (yellow card) 38'	Stadium: Sree Kanteerava Stadium; Attendance: 5,913; Referee: Senthil Nathan; Man of the Match: Ryan Williams (Bengaluru)

21 October 2023 Round 4	East Bengal	1–2	Goa	Bhubaneshwar
17:30 IST	Mahesh (yellow card) 25' (goal) 41'; Pardo (yellow card) 34'	Report	McHugh (yellow card) 37'; Jhingan 74'; Rodríguez 75'; Borges (yellow card) 90+2'	Stadium: Kalinga Stadium; Attendance: 1,500; Referee: Venkatesh R Man of the Match: Víctor Rodríguez (Goa)
Note: The home match was shifted to Bhubaneshwar due to administrative issues.

4 November 2023 Round 6	East Bengal	1–2	Kerala Blasters	Kolkata
20:00 IST	Pardo (yellow card) 17'; Khabra (yellow card) 22'; Siverio (yellow card) 74'; Silva (penalty missed) 85', 90+8' (pen.)	Report	Bhat (yellow card) 11'; Kotal (yellow card) 24'; Sakai 32'; Ruivah (yellow card) 48'; Dimitrios Diamantakos 88' (yellow card) 84' (yellow-red card) 89'	Stadium: Salt Lake Stadium; Attendance: 16,575; Referee: M. Ashwin; Man of the Match: Sachin Suresh (Kerala Blasters)

25 November 2023 Round 7	Chennaiyin	1–1	East Bengal	Chennai
17:30 IST	Edwards (yellow card) 57' (yellow-red card) 90+6'; Meitei 86'	Report	Adhikari 29' (o.g.); Pardo (yellow card) 90+1'	Stadium: Jawaharlal Nehru Stadium; Attendance: 6,329; Referee: Crystal John; Man of the Match: Rafael Crivellaro (Chennaiyin)

4 December 2023 Round 8	East Bengal	5–0	NorthEast United	Kolkata
20:00 IST	Herrera 14'; Silva 24', 66' (yellow card) 45+1'; Mahesh (yellow card) 44'; Sekar 62', 81'; Rakip (yellow card) 90+3'	Report	Singh (yellow card) 70'; Macarton Louis Nickson (yellow card) 77'; Tlang (yellow card) 90+3'; Albiach (penalty missed) 90+5'	Stadium: Salt Lake Stadium; Attendance: 6,973; Referee: Aditya Purkayastha; Man of the Match: Nandhakumar Sekar (East Bengal)

9 December 2023 Round 9	East Bengal	0–0	Punjab	Kolkata
20:00 IST	Herrera (yellow card) 38'; Chakrabarti (yellow card) 67'; Pardo (yellow card) 90+4'	Report	Nitesh Darjee (yellow card) 37'; Nikhil Prabhu N. (yellow card) 41'; Meitei (yellow card) HT	Stadium: Salt Lake Stadium; Attendance: 14,977; Referee: Venkatesh R. Man of the Match: Suresh Meitei (Punjab)

16 December 2023 Round 10	Mumbai City	0–0	East Bengal	Mumbai
20:00 IST	Tiri (yellow card) 12'; Rane (yellow card) 29'; van Nieff (yellow card) 43'	Report	Silva (yellow card) 11'; Chakrabarti (yellow card) 17'; Maher (yellow card) 54'; Gill (yellow card) 76'	Stadium: Mumbai Football Arena; Attendance: 3,488; Referee: M. Ashwin; Man of the Match: Hijazi Maher (East Bengal)

22 December 2023 Round 11	East Bengal	0–0	Odisha	Kolkata
20:00 IST	Maher (yellow card) 41'; Herrera (yellow card) 68'; Chakrabarti (yellow card) 87'; Lalchungnunga (yellow card) 90'; Siverio (yellow card) 90'	Report	Lalrinzuala (yellow card) 28'; Khawlhring (yellow card) 71'	Stadium: Salt Lake Stadium; Attendance: 12,226; Referee: Senthil Nathan; Man of the Match: Souvik Chakrabarti (East Bengal)

3 February 2024 Round 5	Mohun Bagan SG	2–2	East Bengal	Kolkata
20:00 IST	Sadiku 17' (yellow card) 56'; Nassiri (yellow card) 20'; Bose (yellow card) 33'; Tangri (yellow card) 54'; Martins (yellow card) 59'; Petratos 87'	Report	Chhetri 3' (yellow card) 48'; Silva 55' (pen.) (yellow card) 84'; Banerjee (yellow card) 63'; Lalchungnunga (yellow card) 63'; Sekar (yellow card) 87'	Stadium: Salt Lake Stadium; Attendance: 57,983; Referee: Rahul Kumar Gupta; Man of the Match: Dimitri Petratos (Mohun Bagan SG)

10 February 2024 Round 12	NorthEast United	3–2	East Bengal	Guwahati
17:00 IST	Juric 5', 66'; Albiach 15'; Dinesh (yellow card) 30'; Regragui (yellow card) 87'	Report	Silva (yellow card) 24'; Sekar 53'; Lalchungnunga (yellow card) 63'; Forbes 82'	Stadium: Indira Gandhi Athletic Stadium; Attendance: 3,597; Referee: M. Ashwin; Man of the Match: Tomi Juric (NorthEast United)

13 February 2024 Round 13	East Bengal	0–1	Mumbai City	Kolkata
19:30 IST	Maher (yellow card) 62'; Lalchungnunga (yellow card) 71'; Mahesh (yellow card) 81'	Report	Guarrotxena 24'; Mishra (yellow card) 39'; Noguera (yellow card) 89'	Stadium: Salt Lake Stadium; Attendance: 11,172; Referee: Venkatesh R. Man of the Match: Iker Guarrotxena (Mumbai City)

17 February 2024 Round 14	Hyderabad	0–1	East Bengal	Hyderabad
19:30 IST	Saji (yellow card) 53' (yellow-red card) 90+2'; Victor (yellow card) 69' (yellow-red card) 90+6'	Report	Silva 11'; Forbes (yellow card) 50'; Chhetri (yellow card) 80'; Chakrabarti (yellow card) 90+3'	Stadium: G.M.C. Balayogi Athletic Stadium; Attendance: 1,348; Referee: Tejas Nagvenkar; Man of the Match: Cleiton Silva (East Bengal)

22 February 2024 Round 15	Jamshedpur	2–1	East Bengal	Jamshedpur
19:30 IST	Doungel (yellow card) 66'; Tachikawa 81'; Manzorro 90+5'	Report	Sekar 45'; Chhetri (yellow card) 56'; Mahesh (yellow card) 82'; Rakip (yellow card) 90+5'	Stadium: JRD Tata Sports Complex; Attendance: 15,611; Referee: Crystal John; Man of the Match: Jérémy Manzorro (Jamshedpur)

26 February 2024 Round 16	East Bengal	1–0	Chennaiyin	Kolkata
19:30 IST	Sekar 65'; Vázquez (yellow card) 70'; Chakrabarti (yellow card) 81'; Vishnu (yellow card) 90+3'; Maher (yellow card) 90+6'	Report	Edwards (yellow card) 33'; Mukherjee (yellow card) 73'	Stadium: Salt Lake Stadium; Attendance: 13,153; Referee: Aditya Purkayastha; Man of the Match: Nandhakumar Sekar (East Bengal)

29 February 2024 Round 17	Odisha	2–1	East Bengal	Bhubaneshwar
19:30 IST	Mauricio 40' (pen.) (yellow card) 55'; Rebello 61'; Jahouh (yellow card) 70'; Thoiba (yellow card) 90+5'	Report	Vishnu 1'; Suhair (yellow card) 28'; Silva (yellow card) 36'; Rakip (yellow card) 39'; Gill (yellow card) 42'; Chhetri (yellow card) 44'; Forbes (yellow card) 72'	Stadium: Kalinga Stadium; Attendance: 7,348; Referee: I Jamal Mohamed; Man of the Match: Princeton Rebello (Odisha)

6 March 2024 Round 18	Goa	1–0	East Bengal	Margao
19:30 IST	Yasir (yellow card) 35'; Sadaoui 42'	Report	Vázquez (yellow card) 45+2'; Rakip (yellow card) 73'	Stadium: Fatorda Stadium; Attendance: 5,856; Referee: Harish Kundu; Man of the Match: Noah Sadaoui (Goa)

10 March 2024 Round 19	East Bengal	1–3	Mohun Bagan SG	Kolkata
20:30 IST	Silva (penalty missed) 14'; Chhetri (yellow card) 15'; Pantić (yellow card) 24'; Mahesh (yellow card) 52'; Crespo 53'; Singh (yellow card) 59'; Banerjee (yellow card) 60'; Vishnu (yellow card) 90+4'	Report	Vishal Kaith (yellow card) 13'; Cummings 27'; Colaco 37'; Petratos 45+3' (pen.) (yellow card) 60'; Sadiku (yellow card) 90+1'	Stadium: Salt Lake Stadium; Attendance: 59,845; Referee: Tejas Nagvenkar; Man of the Match: Dimitrios Petratos (Mohun Bagan SG)

3 April 2024 Round 20	Kerala Blasters	2–4	East Bengal	Kochi
19:30 IST	Ruivah (yellow card) 12'; Naocha (yellow card) 20' (red card) 74'; Černych 23'; Jeakson (yellow card) 29' (yellow-red card) 44'; Maher 84' (o.g.)	Report	Crespo 45+4' (pen.), 71'; Mahesh 82', 87'	Stadium: Jawaharlal Nehru Stadium; Attendance: 23,418; Referee: Venkatesh R Man of the Match: Saúl Crespo (East Bengal)
Note: The third goal for East Bengal has been awarded to Naorem Mahesh Singh by the league.

7 April 2024 Round 21	East Bengal	2–1	Bengaluru	Kolkata
19:30 IST	Crespo 19' (pen.) (yellow card) 90+8'; Kumar (yellow card) 57'; Aman (yellow card) 66'; Silva 73'; Gill (yellow card) 89'; Chakrabarti (yellow card) 90+7'	Report	Poojary (yellow card) 15'; F Lalremtluanga (yellow card) 18'; Chhetri 60' (pen.); Monirul Molla (yellow card) 90+3'	Stadium: Salt Lake Stadium; Attendance: 19,989; Referee: Tejas Nagvenkar; Man of the Match: Prabhsukhan Singh Gill (East Bengal)

10 April 2024 Round 22	Punjab	4–1	East Bengal	New Delhi
19:30 IST	Jordán 19', 62'; Talal 43'; Nikhil Prabhu N. (yellow card) 54'; Majcen 70'	Report	Banerjee 25'; Rakip (yellow card) 38'; Crespo (yellow card) 48'	Stadium: Jawaharlal Nehru Stadium; Attendance: 0 Referee: Crystal John; Man of the Match: Madih Talal (Punjab)
Note: Closed door match due to security concerns.

=== Super Cup ===
East Bengal along with the other ten Indian Super League teams and four I-League teams shall participate in the Super Cup, which will be in Odisha in January 2024. East Bengal has been grouped in Group A, alongside Indian Super League sides – Mohun Bagan SG, Hyderabad and an I-League side Sreenidhi Deccan. On 9 January, East Bengal faced Hyderabad in the opening fixture of the campaign and managed a 3–2 victory with Cleiton Silva scoring a brace and Saúl Crespo scoring the third. On 14 January, East Bengal faced Sreenidhi Deccan and won 2–1 with goals from Hijazi Maher and Javier Siverio. On 19 January, East Bengal faced their arch-rivals Mohun Bagan Super Giants in the Kolkata Derby fixture in a virtual quarter-final tie that would decide the group champions and who would progress into the semi-finals and East Bengal won 3–1 with captain Cleiton Silva scoring a brace while Nandhakumar Sekar scoring the other, as East Bengal won all three matches in the group to qualify for the semi-final. On 24 January, East Bengal faced Group B winners Jamshedpur in the semi-finals and won 2–0 with goals from Hijazi Maher and Javier Siverio as they entered the final for the second time, after 2018. On 28 January, East Bengal faced the defending champions Odisha in the final at their home ground Kalinga Stadium. Odisha took the lead in the first half as Diego Mauricio scored however, East Bengal came back with goals from Nandhakumar Sekar and Saúl Crespo to lead 2–1 however, East Bengal conceded a penalty in the last second of the match and Ahmed Jahouh scored the equalizer from the spot to take the game into extra time. However, captain Cleiton Silva scored the winner in the 110th minute as East Bengal secured a 3–2 victory to become the champions and lift a major trophy after twelve years.

==== Group Stage ====
Pos	Team	Pld	W	D	L	GF	GA	GD	Pts	Qualification	EAB	MBG	SRD	HYD
1	East Bengal	3	3	0	0	8	4	+4	9	Advance to knockout stage	—	3–1	2–1	3–2
2	Mohun Bagan	3	2	0	1	5	5	0	6		—	—	2–1	2–1
3	Sreenidi Deccan	3	1	0	2	6	5	+1	3		—	—	—	4–1
4	Hyderabad	3	0	0	3	4	9	−5	0		—	—	—	—

Source: AIFF
Rules for classification: 1) points; 2) head-to-head points; 3) head-to-head goal difference; 4) goal difference; 5) number of goals scored; 6) drawing of lots

==== Knockout Stage ====
Semifinals
A1	East Bengal	2
B1	Jamshedpur	0
C1	Mumbai City	0
D1	Odisha	1

Final
SFW1	East Bengal (a.e.t.)	3
SFW2	Odisha	2

==== Matches ====
Win Draw Loss Void

9 January 2024 Group stage	East Bengal	3–2	Hyderabad	Bhubaneshwar
14:00 IST	Silva 33', 54' (yellow card) 78'; Crespo 80'; Herrera (yellow card) 88'	Report	Ramhlunchhunga 45'; Mohammed (yellow card) 72'; Tamang 79' (pen.)	Stadium: Kalinga Stadium Pitch 1 Attendance: 300; Referee: Harish Kundu; Man of the Match: Cleiton Silva (East Bengal)

14 January 2024 Group stage	East Bengal	2–1	Sreenidhi Deccan	Bhubaneshwar
19:30 IST	Maher 12'; Siverio 31'; Chhetri (yellow card) 57'; Vishnu (yellow card) 90+5'	Report	Alves 90+1' (pen.)	Stadium: Kalinga Stadium; Attendance: 500; Referee: Harish Kundu; Man of the Match: Hijazi Maher (East Bengal)

19 January 2024 Group stage	Mohun Bagan SG	1–3	East Bengal	Bhubaneshwar
19:30 IST	Yuste 19'; Martins (yellow card) 32'; Raj Basfore (yellow card) 45'; Petratos (penalty missed) 45+5'; Rai (yellow card) 64'; Hamill (yellow card) 64'	Report	Silva 24', 80'; Crespo (yellow card) 38'; Herrera (yellow card) 45+3'; Siverio (yellow card) 45+3'; Maher (yellow card) 45+3'; Sekar 63'; Gill (yellow card) 79'	Stadium: Kalinga Stadium; Attendance: 6,457; Referee: R. Venkatesh; Man of the Match: Cleiton Silva (East Bengal)

24 January 2024 Semi—final	East Bengal	2–0	Jamshedpur	Bhubaneshwar
19:30 IST	Maher 19'; Siverio 47'; Silva (penalty missed) 83'	Report		Stadium: Kalinga Stadium; Attendance: 1,080; Referee: Rahu Kumar Gupta; Man of the Match: Hijazi Maher (East Bengal)

28 January 2024 Final	East Bengal	3–2 (a.e.t.)	Odisha	Bhubaneshwar
19:30 IST	Sekar 51'; Crespo 62' (pen.); Rakip (yellow card) 64'; Lalchungnunga (yellow card) 78'; Chakrabarti (yellow card) 87' (yellow-red card) 97'; Gill (yellow card) 90+7'; Sayan Banerjee (yellow card) 108'; Silva 111' (yellow card) 112'	Report	Krishna (yellow card) 31'; Mauricio 39'; Fall (yellow card) 61' (yellow-red card) 68'; Jahouh (yellow card) 69' (goal) 90+9' (pen.); Ranawade (yellow card) 108'	Stadium: Kalinga Stadium; Attendance: 10,121; Referee: Venkatesh R Man of the Match: Saúl Crespo (East Bengal)

=== Calcutta Football League ===
==== Summary ====
East Bengal participated in the 2023 CFL Premier Division and was drawn into group B for the first phase of the tournament where twenty-six teams were divided into two groups of thirteen teams each. East Bengal would be mainly fielding their Reserve squad for the tournament with coach Bino George taking charge of the team. In the opening match on 13 July, East Bengal faced ASOS Raibow at the Kishore Bharati Krirangan and were held onto a goalless draw to start their campaign. On 17 July, East Bengal faced West Bengal Police and achieved their first win of the season as they won 4–2 at the Bankimanjali Stadium in Naihati. Bunando Singh, Sarthak Golui, Dip Saha and Abhishek Kunjam scored for East Bengal. On 20 July, East Bengal faced Kidderpore and won 2–0. Tuhin Das and Shyamal Besra scored for East Bengal as they latched up consecutive wins. On 24 July, East Bengal faced BSS at Naihati and were held to a 1–1 draw. East Bengal went down to 10 men after Tuhin Das was given a straight red card in the first half, however, it was East Bengal who took the lead in the ninetieth minute through a direct freekick strike from Dip Saha. BSS scored the equalizer in the seventh minute of injury time as East Bengal had a settle for a draw. On 27 July East Bengal faced Eastern Railway at the East Bengal Ground and won 5–1. Aman C. K. scored a brace while Avishek Kunjam, Vanlalpeka Guite, and Razibul Mistry scored one each as East Bengal registered their third win of the campaign. On 31 July, East Bengal faced Wari at the East Bengal Ground and won 5–0. Avishek Kunjam scored a brace while Dip Saha, Tanmay Das and Aman C. K. scored one each as East Bengal registered their fourth win of the campaign. On 3 August, East Bengal faced Bhawanipore and drew 1–1, with Dip Saha scoring for East Bengal. On 9 August, East Bengal defeated Railway FC 2–0 with goals from Aman C. K. and Nishu Kumar to earn their fifth win of the campaign. On 14 August, East Bengal defeated Police AC 2–1 with goals from Avishek Kunjam and P. V. Vishnu to grab their sixth win of the campaign. On 19 August, East Bengal defeated Aryan 2–0 with goals from Jesin TK and Aman C. K. as they grabbed their seventh win of the campaign. On 22 August, East Bengal defeated Calcutta Customs 1–0 with a goal from Mahitosh Roy as they grabbed their eighth victory of the campaign and secured a place in the Super–six of the Calcutta League. on 7 September, East Bengal faced George Telegraph in the last match of the first phase and won 4–0 to finish top of the group with 30 points and entered into the Super–six round. Jesin TK scored a hattrick and P. V. Vishnu scored the other goal for East Bengal.

On 20 September, East Bengal faced Mohammedan Sporting in the first match of the Super–six round and suffered a 2–1 defeat. David Lalhlansanga scored a brace for Mohammedan while Nandhakumar Sekar reduced the margin for East Bengal. On 26 September, East Bengal faced Kidderpore and recorded their fifth biggest win ever after winning 10–1 at the East Bengal Ground. P. V. Vishnu scored four, Mahitosh Ray scored thrice, V. P. Suhair scored a brace while Jesin TK scored the other for East Bengal. On 30 October, East Bengal faced Diamond Harbour and won 4–1. Jesin TK, Mahitosh Ray, Tuhin Das and Abhishek Kunjam scored for East Bengal while Rahul Paswan scored for Diamond Harbour. On 18 November, Bhawanipore informed that they can not field a team hence a walkover win was awarded to East Bengal and on 30 November, East Bengal were to face Mohun Bagan SG at the Bankimanjali Stadium however, Mohun Bagan SG did not field a team and East Bengal was awarded a walkover win, as they finished runners-up in the league.

==== League table ====
===== Group B =====
Pos	Team	Pld	W	D	L	GF	GA	GD	Pts	Qualification
1	East Bengal	12	9	3	0	29	6	+23	30	Qualified for the Super Six round
2	Bhawanipore	12	8	3	1	23	8	+15	27	Qualified for the Super Six round
3	Kidderpore	12	8	1	3	16	11	+5	25	Qualified for the Super Six round
4	Aryan	12	8	0	4	28	12	+16	24	
5	Calcutta Customs	12	6	1	5	13	13	0	19	

Source: The Away End
Rules for classification: 1) points; 2) head-to-head points; 3) head-to-head goal difference; 4) goal difference; 5) number of goals scored; 6) drawing of lots

===== Super Six =====
Pos	Team	Pld	W	D	L	GF	GA	GD	Pts	Qualification
1	Mohammedan (C)	17	14	2	1	44	11	+33	44	Champions
2	East Bengal	17	13	3	1	50	10	+40	42	
3	Diamond Harbour (Q)	16	10	3	3	32	12	+20	33	Eligible for 2024–25 I-League 3 (Note: If the top teams are already playing in national leagues, then the next highest ranked team(s) would be eligible for I-League 3.)
4	Bhawanipore	16	8	4	4	26	18	+8	28	Eligible for 2024–25 I-League 3
5	Mohun Bagan SG	15	8	3	4	33	18	+15	25 (Note: Mohun Bagan Super Giant was deducted 2 points for not fielding a team against East Bengal on 30 November 2023.)	
6	Kidderpore	15	8	1	6	17	29	−12	25	

Source: The Away End
Rules for classification: 1) points; 2) goal difference; 3) number of goals scored; 4) head-to-head points; 5) head-to-head goal difference; 6) fair play ranking; 7) drawing of lots
(C) Champions; (Q) Qualified for the phase indicated

==== Matches ====
Win Draw Loss Void

13 July 2023 1	East Bengal	0–0	ASOS Rainbow	Kolkata
15:30 IST	Sanjib Ghosh (yellow card) 27'; Naseeb Rahman (yellow card) 78'; Golui (yellow card) 83'	Report	Moula (yellow card) 84'; S. Sherpa (yellow card) 90+5'	Stadium: Kishore Bharati Krirangan; Attendance: 4,000; Referee: Shubhankar Khamri; Man of the Match: Sourav Dasgupta (ASOS Rainbow)

17 July 2023 2	East Bengal	4–2	West Bengal Police	Naihati
15:30 IST	Bunando Singh Khangembam 17'; Golui 25' (yellow card) 47'; Dip Saha 66' (pen.); Avishek Kunjam 74'	Report	Dipankar Das (yellow card) 24'; Subrata Biswas 32'; Rajib Dutta 48'; Anupam Dutta (yellow card) 90+6'	Stadium: Bankimanjali Stadium; Attendance: 3,000; Referee: Suvajit Pramanik; Man of the Match: Avishek Kunjam (East Bengal)

20 July 2023 3	East Bengal	2–0	Kidderpore	Naihati
15:00 IST	Das 32' (yellow card) 82'; Shyamal Besra 90+1'	Report		Stadium: Bankimanjali Stadium; Attendance: 5,000; Referee: Tarun Kumar Biswas; Man of the Match: Souvik Chakrabarti (East Bengal)

24 July 2023 4	East Bengal	1–1	BSS	Naihati
15:00 IST	Das (red card) 16'; Sanjib Ghosh (yellow card) 65'; Dip Saha 90'	Report	Subhankar Das (yellow card) 43'; Naba Kumar Das (yellow card) 54' (yellow-red card) 88'; Sourav Sen 90+7'	Stadium: Bankimanjali Stadium; Attendance: 2,000; Referee: Pranjal Banerjee; Man of the Match: Sourav Sen (BSS)

27 July 2023 5	Eastern Railway	1–5	East Bengal	Kolkata
15:00 IST	Dibyendu Chanda 52'	Report	Avishek Kunjam 21'; Lijo K (yellow card) 25'; Vanlalpeka Guite 31'; Aman C. K. 36', 78'; Razibul Mistry 88'	Stadium: East Bengal Ground; Attendance: 8,000; Referee: Tanmay Dhar; Man of the Match: Aman C. K. (East Bengal)

31 July 2023 6	East Bengal	5–0	Wari	Kolkata
15:00 IST	Dip Saha 53'; Tanmay Das 70'; Avishek Kunjam 90+1', 90+5'; Aman C. K. 90+4'	Report	Lallawmsanga (penalty missed) 26'; Swarup Sarkar (yellow card) 34'; Afdal Varikkodan (yellow card) 56'	Stadium: East Bengal Ground; Attendance: 6,000; Referee: Pranay Saha; Man of the Match: Gunraj Singh Grewal (East Bengal)

3 August 2023 7	Bhawanipore	1–1	East Bengal	Kolkata
15:00 IST	Singh (yellow card) 13' (goal) 30'	Report	Dip Saha 54'; Muhammed Roshal (yellow card) 77'; Adil Amal (yellow card) 87'	Stadium: East Bengal Ground; Attendance: 8,000; Referee: Rabin Biswas; Man of the Match: Dip Saha (East Bengal)

9 August 2023 8	Railway	0–2	East Bengal	Kolkata
15:00 IST	Kamalesh Paik (yellow card) 31'; Prosanta Das (yellow card) 59'	Report	Aman C. K. 20' (yellow card) 43'; Tanmay Das (yellow card) 51'; Kumar 64'	Stadium: East Bengal Ground; Attendance: 2,000; Referee: Tanumoy Sarkar; Man of the Match: Aman C. K. (East Bengal)

14 August 2023 9	Police AC	1–2	East Bengal	Kolkata
15:00 IST	Jagmeet Singh 48'; Suvankar Das (yellow card) 64'; Asik Khan (yellow card) 83'; Biswajit Dasgupta (yellow card) 85'	Report	Avishek Kunjam 15'; Malsawmtluanga Hrahsel (yellow card) 18'; P. V. Vishnu 88'	Stadium: East Bengal Ground; Attendance: 2,000; Referee: Bimalendu Mondal; Man of the Match: P. V. Vishnu (East Bengal)

19 August 2023 10	Aryan	0–2	East Bengal	Naihati
15:00 IST	Akash Mondal (yellow card) 24'; Avijit Pradhan (yellow card) 47'; Rakes Karmakar (yellow card) 90+7'	Report	Jesin 45+2'; Aman C. K. 45+4'	Stadium: Bankimanjali Stadium; Attendance: 2,000; Referee: Simanta Kahar; Man of the Match: Jesin TK (East Bengal)

22 August 2023 11	Calcutta Customs	0–1	East Bengal	Kolkata
15:00 IST	Biswajit Hembrom (yellow card) 36' (yellow-red card) 71'	Report	Guite Vanlalpeka (yellow card) 66'; Aman C. K. (yellow card) 74'; Mahitosh Roy 87'	Stadium: East Bengal Ground; Attendance: 3,000; Referee: Avisekh Saha; Man of the Match: Mahitosh Roy (East Bengal)

7 September 2023 12	East Bengal	4–0	George Telegraph	Kolkata
15:00 IST	Jesin 47', 49', 82' (pen.); P. V. Vishnu 51'; Das (yellow card) 79'	Report	Rajen Orao (yellow card) 34'	Stadium: East Bengal Ground; Attendance: 1,100; Referee: Dipak Singha; Man of the Match: Jesin TK (East Bengal)

20 September 2023 Super–Six	East Bengal	1–2	Mohammedan Sporting	Kolkata
15:00 IST	Sekar 60' (pen.); Suhair (yellow card) 66'	Report	Lalhlansanga 5', 38'; Irshad (yellow card) 59'; Sagolsem Bikash Singh (yellow card) 86'; Ralte (yellow card) 88'	Stadium: Kishore Bharati Krirangan; Attendance: 10,000; Referee: Nripen Halder; Man of the Match: David Lalhlansanga (Mohammedan SC)

26 September 2023 Super–Six	East Bengal	10–1	Kidderpore	Kolkata
15:00 IST	P. V. Vishnu 6', 10', 37', 51'; Mahitosh Roy 40', 45', 45+3'; Jesin 54'; Suhair 57', 82'	Report	Sekh Mustafa Ali (yellow card) 5'; Pradip Pal 43'; Sumit Das (yellow card) 45+2'; Supriya Mahanti (yellow card) 86'	Stadium: East Bengal Ground; Attendance: 2,000; Referee: Rohan Das Gupta; Man of the Match: P. V. Vishnu (East Bengal)

30 October 2023 Super–Six	East Bengal	4–1	Diamond Harbour	Kolkata
15:00 IST	Jesin 36'; Dip Saha (yellow card) 55'; Mahitosh Roy 60'; Das 78'; Avishek Kunjam 90'	Report	Paswan 45+2'	Stadium: East Bengal Ground; Attendance: 1,000; Referee: Tanumoy Sarkar; Man of the Match: Jesin TK (East Bengal)

18 November 2023 Super–Six	East Bengal	3–0	Bhawanipore	Kolkata
15:00 IST				Stadium: East Bengal Ground
Note: Bhawanipore did not field a team hence, East Bengal was awarded a walkover.

30 November 2023 Super–Six	East Bengal	3–0	Mohun Bagan SG	Naihati
14:00 IST				Stadium: Bankimanjali Stadium
Note: Mohun Bagan SG did not field a team hence, East Bengal was awarded a walkover.

== Statistics ==
=== Appearances ===
Players with no appearances are not included in the list.

As of till the end of 2023–24 season.

Appearances for East Bengal in 2023–24 season
No.	Pos.	Nat.	Name	Durand Cup		Indian Super League		Super Cup		Calcutta League		Total	
No.	Pos.	Nat.	Name	Apps	Starts	Apps	Starts	Apps	Starts	Apps	Starts	Apps	Starts
Goalkeepers
13	GK	(India)	Prabhsukhan Singh Gill	6	6	21	21	5	5	0	0	32	32
27	GK	(India)	Aditya Patra	0	0	0	0	0	0	9	9	9	9
31	GK	(India)	Kamaljit Singh	0	0	1	1	0	0	1	1	2	2
51	GK	(India)	Muhammed Nishad P P	—						5	4	5	4
75	GK	(India)	Ranit Sarkar	—		0	0	0	0	1	1	1	1
Defenders
4	CB	(Spain)	José Antonio Pardo	4	1	11	9	5	5	—		20	15
5	CB	(India)	Lalchungnunga	6	6	17	14	1	0	0	0	24	20
7	RB	(India)	Harmanjot Singh Khabra	6	6	12	9	—		0	0	18	15
12	CB	(India)	Mohammad Rakip	4	1	19	11	5	5	8	8	36	25
16	CB	(India)	Sarthak Golui	—						5	5	5	5
17	LB	(India)	Mandar Rao Dessai	5	4	17	13	2	1	0	0	24	18
19	CB	(Jordan)	Hijazi Maher	—		17	16	5	5	—		22	21
22	RB	(India)	Nishu Kumar	5	4	20	17	4	4	1	1	30	26
25	CB	(India)	Athul Unnikrishnan	0	0	0	0	—		10	10	10	10
28	CB	(Serbia)	Aleksandar Pantić	—		8	5	—				8	5
33	CB	(India)	Gursimrat Singh Gill	2	1	2	1	1	1	6	5	11	8
37	LB	(India)	Tuhin Das	0	0	0	0	—		10	9	10	9
44	CB	(Australia)	Jordan Elsey	6	5	—						6	5
52	LB	(India)	Niranjan Mondal	—						10	6	10	6
53	RB	(India)	Arpan Polley	—						2	0	2	0
54	LB	(India)	Adil Amal	—						4	3	4	3
55	CB	(India)	Subhendu Mandi	—						8	8	8	8
65	CB	(India)	Rahul Naskar	—						2	1	2	1
74	RB	(India)	Bunando Singh Khangembam	—						4	2	4	2
80	CB	(India)	Malsawmtluanga Hrahsel	—						1	1	1	1
Midfielders
6	CM	(India)	Ajay Chhetri	—		9	6	5	1	2	1	16	8
8	CM	(India)	Edwin Sydney Vanspaul	4	0	4	1	1	0	4	4	13	5
9	CM	(Spain)	Víctor Vázquez	—		10	7	—				10	7
15	CM	(India)	Mobashir Rahman	2	0	1	0	—		4	3	7	3
21	CM	(Spain)	Saúl Crespo	6	6	14	14	5	4	—		25	24
23	CM	(India)	Souvik Chakrabarti	4	3	19	15	5	4	5	3	33	25
26	CM	(Spain)	Borja Herrera	6	4	9	7	4	4	—		19	15
29	CM	(India)	Naorem Mahesh Singh	6	6	21	20	1	0	0	0	28	26
30	AM	(India)	Vanlalpeka Guite	2	1	1	0	0	0	5	4	8	5
35	CM	(India)	Gunraj Singh Grewal	1	0	0	0	0	0	8	6	9	6
56	LW	(India)	Lijo Kurusappan	—						7	4	7	4
57	AM	(India)	Mahitosh Roy	—		1	0	—		8	4	9	4
58	RW	(India)	Sanjib Ghosh	—						10	7	10	7
60	CM	(India)	Dip Saha	—						10	9	10	9
61	CM	(India)	Tanmay Das	—		0	0	0	0	12	9	12	9
62	LW	(India)	Aman C. K.	—		4	0	1	0	10	8	15	8
63	RW	(India)	Muhammed Roshal PP	—						5	3	5	3
64	CM	(India)	Naseeb Rahman	—						3	2	3	2
66	RW	(India)	Sourav Biswas	—						2	0	2	0
67	CM	(India)	Shyamal Besra	—		1	0	—		6	1	7	1
68	AM	(India)	Kush Chhetry	—						7	6	6	6
73	LW	(India)	Razibul Mistry	—						2	0	2	0
78	RW	(India)	Muhammed K. Ashique	—						1	0	1	0
81	RW	(India)	Suman Dey	—						3	0	3	0
84	LW	(India)	Sayan Banerjee	—		7	4	3	0	—		10	4
Forwards
10	FW	(Brazil)	Cleiton Silva	4	0	21	20	5	5	—		30	25
11	FW	(India)	Nandhakumar Sekar	6	6	19	14	5	5	1	1	31	26
20	FW	(India)	V. P. Suhair	5	0	8	2	2	0	2	1	17	3
59	FW	(India)	Jesin TK	0	0	2	0	1	0	10	6	13	6
70	FW	(India)	Abhishek Kunjam	—		0	0	—		13	10	13	10
76	FW	(India)	Muhammad Niyas M A	—						4	2	4	2
82	FW	(India)	P. V. Vishnu	—		19	8	5	2	7	4	31	18
91	FW	(Costa Rica)	Felicio Brown Forbes	—		11	4	—				11	4
99	FW	(Spain)	Javier Siverio	6	6	10	3	5	4	—		21	13

=== Goal scorers ===
As of till the end of 2023–24 season.

Rank	No.	Pos.	Nat.	Name	Durand Cup	Indian Super League	Super Cup	Calcutta League	Total
1	10	FW	(India)	Cleiton Silva	0	8	5	—	13
2	11	FW	(India)	Nandhakumar Sekar	2	5	2	1	10
3	21	CM	(Spain)	Saúl Crespo	1	4	2	—	7
3	82	FW	(India)	P. V. Vishnu	—	1	0	6	7
5	59	FW	(India)	Jesin TK	0	0	0	6	6
5	70	FW	(India)	Abhishek Kunjam	—	0	—	6	6
7	29	LW	(India)	Naorem Mahesh Singh	1	4	—	0	5
7	57	AM	(India)	Mahitosh Roy	—	0	—	5	5
7	62	LW	(India)	Aman C. K.	—	0	0	5	5
10	60	CM	(India)	Dip Saha	—			4	4
10	99	FW	(Spain)	Javier Siverio	2	0	2	—	4
12	19	CB	(Jordan)	Hijazi Maher	—	0	2	—	2
12	20	FW	(India)	V. P. Suhair	0	0	—	2	2
12	37	LB	(India)	Tuhin Das	0	0	—	2	2
15	6	CM	(India)	Ajay Chhetri	—	1	0	0	1
15	16	CB	(India)	Sarthak Golui	—			1	1
15	22	LB	(India)	Nishu Kumar	0	0	0	1	1
15	26	CM	(Spain)	Borja Herrera	0	1	0	—	1
15	30	AM	(India)	Vanlalpeka Guite	0	0	0	1	1
15	44	CB	(Australia)	Jordan Elsey	1	—			1
15	61	CM	(India)	Tanmay Das	—	0	0	1	1
15	66	CM	(India)	Shyamal Besra	—	0	—	1	1
15	73	LW	(India)	Razibul Mistry	—			1	1
15	74	RB	(India)	Bunando Singh Khangembam	—			1	1
15	84	LW	(India)	Sayan Banerjee	—	1	0	—	1
15	91	FW	(Costa Rica)	Felicio Brown Forbes	—	1	—		1
Own Goals					1	1	—	0	3
Total					8	27	13	44	92

==== Hat-tricks ====
Player	Against	Result	Date	Competition
(India) Jesin TK	George Telegraph	4–0	7 September 2023	CFL 2023
(India) P. V. Vishnu	Kidderpore	10–1	26 September 2023	CFL 2023
(India) Mahitosh Roy	Kidderpore	10–1	26 September 2023	CFL 2023

=== Assists ===
As of till the end of 2023–24 season.

Rank	No.	Pos.	Nat.	Name	Durand Cup	Indian Super League	Super Cup	Calcutta League	Total
1	82	FW	(India)	P. V. Vishnu	—	2	0	4	6
2	10	FW	(Brazil)	Cleiton Silva	1	3	1	—	5
2	22	RB	(India)	Nishu Kumar	0	3	2	0	5
4	11	FW	(India)	Nandhakumar Sekar	0	3	0	0	3
4	22	RB	(India)	Nishu Kumar	0	1	2	0	3
4	26	CM	(Spain)	Borja Herrera	2	0	1	—	3
4	29	LW	(India)	Naorem Mahesh Singh	0	2	1	—	3
4	57	CM	(India)	Mahitosh Roy	—			3	3
4	59	FW	(India)	Jesin TK	0	—	0	3	3
9	21	DM	(Spain)	Saúl Crespo	1	0	1	—	2
9	30	AM	(India)	Vanlalpeka Guite	0	0	0	2	2
9	58	LW	(India)	Sanjib Ghosh	—			2	2
9	61	CM	(India)	Tanmay Das	—		0	2	2
9	62	RW	(India)	Aman C. K.	—	1	0	1	2
9	68	AM	(India)	Kush Chhetry	—			2	2
14	7	RB	(India)	Harmanjot Singh Khabra	1	0	—		1
14	9	AM	(Spain)	Víctor Vázquez	—	1	—		1
14	12	RB	(India)	Mohammad Rakip	0	0	1	0	1
14	15	CM	(India)	Mobashir Rahman	0	0	—	1	1
14	17	LB	(India)	Mandar Rao Dessai	0	1	0	0	1
14	20	FW	(India)	V. P. Suhair	0	0	0	1	1
14	23	CM	(India)	Souvik Chakrabarti	0	0	1	0	1
14	28	CB	(Serbia)	Aleksandar Pantić	—	1	—		1
14	35	CM	(India)	Gunraj Singh Grewal	0	0	0	1	1
14	52	LB	(India)	Niranjan Mondal	—			1	1
14	70	FW	(India)	Avishek Kunjam	—	0	—	1	1
14	99	FW	(Spain)	Javier Siverio	1	0	0	—	1
Total					6	18	8	24	56

=== Clean sheets ===
As of till the end of 2023–24 season.

No.	Nat.	Player	Durand Cup	Indian Super League	Super Cup	Calcutta League	Total
13	(India)	Prabhsukhan Singh Gill	2	7	1	0	10
27	(India)	Aditya Patra	0	0	0	5	5
31	(India)	Kamaljit Singh	0	0	0	0	0
51	(India)	Muhammed Nishad P P	—			2	2
75	(India)	Ranit Sarkar	—			0	0

=== Disciplinary record ===
As of till the end of 2023–24 season.

No.	Pos.	Nat.	Name	Durand Cup				Indian Super League				Super Cup				Calcutta League			
No.	Pos.	Nat.	Name	Yellow card	(yellow card) (red card)	(yellow card) (yellow-red card)	Red card	Yellow card	(yellow card) (red card)	(yellow card) (yellow-red card)	Red card	Yellow card	(yellow card) (red card)	(yellow card) (yellow-red card)	Red card	Yellow card	(yellow card) (red card)	(yellow card) (yellow-red card)	Red card
4	CB	(India)	José Antonio Pardo	0	0	0	0	4	0	0	0	0	0	0	0	—			
5	CB	(India)	Lalchungnunga	1	0	0	0	4	0	0	0	1	0	0	0	0	0	0	0
6	CM	(India)	Ajay Chhetri	—				5	0	0	0	0	0	0	0	0	0	0	0
7	RB	(India)	Harmanjot Singh Khabra	2	0	0	0	1	0	0	0	—				0	0	0	0
9	CM	(Spain)	Víctor Vázquez	—				2	0	0	0	—				—			
10	FW	(Brazil)	Cleiton Silva	0	0	0	0	5	0	0	0	2	0	0	0	—			
11	FW	(India)	Nandhakumar Sekar	0	0	0	0	1	0	0	0	0	0	0	0	0	0	0	0
12	RB	(India)	Mohammad Rakip	0	0	0	0	5	0	0	0	1	0	0	0	0	0	0	0
13	GK	(India)	Prabhsukhan Singh Gill	1	0	0	0	4	0	0	0	2	0	0	0	0	0	0	0
16	CB	(India)	Sarthak Golui	—				—				—				2	0	0	0
19	CB	(Jordan)	Hijazi Maher	—				4	0	0	0	1	0	0	0	—			
20	FW	(India)	V. P. Suhair	1	0	0	0	1	0	0	0	—				1	0	0	0
21	DM	(Spain)	Saúl Crespo	2	0	0	0	3	0	0	0	1	0	0	0	—			
22	RB	(India)	Nishu Kumar	0	0	0	1	2	0	0	0	0	0	0	0	0	0	0	0
23	CM	(India)	Souvik Chakrabarti	3	0	0	0	7	0	0	0	0	0	1	0	0	0	0	0
26	CM	(Spain)	Borja Herrera	2	0	0	0	3	0	0	0	2	0	0	0	—			
28	CB	(Serbia)	Aleksandar Pantić	—				1	0	0	0	—				—			
29	LW	(India)	Naorem Mahesh Singh	1	0	0	0	6	0	0	0	—				0	0	0	0
30	AM	(India)	Vanlalpeka Guite	0	0	0	0	0	0	0	0	0	0	0	0	1	0	0	0
31	GK	(India)	Kamaljit Singh	0	0	0	0	1	0	0	0	0	0	0	0	0	0	0	0
37	LB	(India)	Tuhin Das	0	0	0	0	0	0	0	0	—				2	0	0	1
54	CB	(India)	Adil Amal	—				—				—				1	0	0	0
56	LW	(India)	Lijo Kurusappan	—				—				—				1	0	0	0
58	RW	(India)	Sanjib Ghosh	—				—				—				2	0	0	0
60	CM	(India)	Dip Saha	—				—				—				1	0	0	0
61	CM	(India)	Tanmay Das	—				—				0	0	0	0	1	0	0	0
62	RW	(India)	Aman C. K.	—				1	0	0	0	0	0	0	0	2	0	0	0
63	RW	(India)	Muhammed Roshal PP	—				—				—				1	0	0	0
64	CM	(India)	Naseeb Rahman	—				—				—				1	0	0	0
80	CB	(India)	Malsawmtluanga Hrahsel	—				—				—				1	0	0	0
82	FW	(India)	P. V. Vishnu	—				2	0	0	0	1	0	0	0	0	0	0	0
84	LW	(India)	Sayan Banerjee	—				2	0	0	0	1	0	0	0	—			
91	FW	(Costa Rica)	Felicio Brown Forbes	—				2	0	0	0	—				—			
99	FW	(Spain)	Javier Siverio	2	0	0	0	3	0	0	0	1	0	0	0	—			

== See also ==
- 2023–24 in Indian football
