= 2022–23 East Bengal FC season =

Indian football club season

East Bengal
2022–23 season
- Owner: Emami East Bengal FC Pvt. Ltd.
- Head coach: Stephen Constantine
- Stadium: Salt Lake Stadium; East Bengal Ground
- Indian Super League: 9th
- Calcutta League: 4th
- Durand Cup: Group stage
- Super Cup: Group Stage
- Top goalscorer: League: Cleiton Silva (12); All: Cleiton Silva (14)
- Highest home attendance: 60,102 v ATK Mohun Bagan; 25 February 2023; Indian Super League
- Lowest home attendance: 1,982 v NorthEast United; 8 February 2023; Indian Super League
- Average home league attendance: 14,424
- Biggest win: 3–1 vs NorthEast United; 20 October 2022; Indian Super League 3–1 vs Jamshedpur; 27 November 2022; Indian Super League
- Biggest defeat: 0–3 vs Mumbai City; 16 December 2022; Indian Super League
Home colours	Away colours	Third colours

The 2022–23 season was the 103rd season of East Bengal Football Club and their third season in the Indian Super League, the top flight of Indian football. The Indian football season started in August and ended in April. During the season, East Bengal competed in the Durand Cup and got eliminated in the group stage, they finished fourth in the Calcutta Football League, had a ninth-place finish in the Indian Super League and got eliminated in the group stage of the Super Cup.

Before the start of the season, East Bengal and Shree Cement's joint venture was terminated, and the club inked a new partnership with Emami as their principal investor in August. Stephen Constantine was appointed as the new head coach. East Bengal however, ended the league campaign with just six wins and thirteen defeats, finishing at the ninth position and with eliminations from group stages from both the Durand Cup and the Indian Super Cup. The club announced the departure of head coach Stephen Constantine at the end of the season due to poor performance.

== Background ==
The partnership between investor group Shree Cement and East Bengal Club was terminated after the end of the 2021–22 Indian Super League and they returned the sporting rights back to the club on 12 April 2022, after both the parties failed to reach an agreement and the final term sheet was not accepted and signed by the club officials. The club officials, however, stated that East Bengal club shall continue to play in the Indian Super League, and shall be announcing their new investors within the next two weeks. East Bengal Club was once again handed another transfer ban by AIFF for non-payment of dues for seven of their players.

On 25 May, East Bengal announced the collaboration with Emami as the principal investors of the club. The club confirmed their participation in the 2022–23 Indian Super League with the arrival of the new investors. On 18 July, after two months of contractual discussions between the club and the investor group, the club finally started the recruitment process for the new season after receiving a go-ahead from the investors. On 22 July, the AIFF uplifted the transfer ban set on East Bengal and thus allowed the club to register their new signings for the season. East Bengal appointed Santosh Trophy winning Kerala football team coach Bino George as the head coach of the East Bengal Reserves team, who participated in the Calcutta Football League, and also served as the assistant coach of the first team for the Indian Super League. East Bengal also roped in former India national football team coach Stephen Constantine as the new head-coach of the team for the season. On 2 August 2022, the formal launch of Emami East Bengal was held in Kolkata and the tie-up between the club and the investor group Emami was officially announced. The club and the investor group formed a new company named "Emami East Bengal Pvt. Ltd." where the club would hold 23% share while 77% would be in the hands of Emami group. The club officially rebranded themselves and played as 'East Bengal FC' in the season in the Indian Super League.

== Transfers ==
=== Incoming ===
Date	No.	Pos.	Name	Signed from	Fee	Ref
3 August 2022	13	GK	(India) Pawan Kumar	(India) Jamshedpur	Free Transfer	
3 August 2022	15	MF	(India) Mobashir Rahman	(India) Jamshedpur	Free Transfer	
3 August 2022	33	DF	(India) Pritam Singh	(India) Hyderabad	Free Transfer	
3 August 2022	23	MF	(India) Souvik Chakrabarti	(India) Hyderabad	Free Transfer	
3 August 2022	7	FW	(India) Aniket Jadhav	(India) Hyderabad	Undisclosed (Note: Reported as ₹10 Lakhs.)	
3 August 2022	2	DF	(India) Mohammad Rakip	(India) Mumbai City	Free Transfer	
3 August 2022	16	DF	(India) Sarthak Golui	(India) Bengaluru	Free Transfer	
3 August 2022	17	DF	(India) Jerry Lalrinzuala	(India) Chennaiyin	Free Transfer	
3 August 2022	29	FW	(India) Naorem Mahesh	(India) Kerala Blasters	Undisclosed (Note: Reported as ₹6 Lakhs.)	
3 August 2022	11	FW	(India) V.P. Suhair	(India) NorthEast United	Undisclosed (Note: Reported as ₹75 Lakhs.)	
11 August 2022	1	GK	(India) Kamaljit Singh	(India) Odisha	Undisclosed	
11 August 2022	6	FW	(India) Sumit Passi	(India) Roundglass Punjab	Free Transfer	
12 August 2022	4	DF	(Spain) Iván González	(India) Goa	Free Transfer	
12 August 2022	40	DF	(Cyprus) Charis Kyriakou	(Cyprus) Doxa Katokopias	Free Transfer	
12 August 2022	14	MF	(Brazil) Alex Lima	(India) Jamshedpur	Free Transfer	
12 August 2022	10	FW	(Brazil) Cleiton Silva	(India) Bengaluru	Free Transfer	
12 August 2022	9	FW	(Brazil) Eliandro	(Thailand) Samut Prakan	Free Transfer	
22 August 2022	24	MF	(Australia) Jordan O'Doherty	(Australia) Newcastle Jets	Free Transfer	
27 January 2023	77	FW	(England) Jake Jervis	(Finland) SJK Seinäjoki	Free Transfer	

=== Loan in ===
Start date	End date	No.	Pos.	Name	Loaned from	Ref
3 August 2022	End of season	8	MF	(India) Amarjit Singh Kiyam	(India) Goa	
11 August 2022	End of season	5	DF	(India) Lalchungnunga	(India) Sreenidi Deccan	
20 August 2022	End of season	18	FW	(India) Himanshu Jangra	(India) Delhi	
22 August 2022	End of season	32	GK	(India) Naveen Kumar	(India) Goa	

=== Outgoing ===
Exit Date	No.	Pos.	Name	Signed to	Fee	Ref
1 June 2022	1	GK	(India) Sankar Roy	(India) Mohammedan Sporting	Free Transfer	
1 June 2022	2	DF	(India) Daniel Gomes	(India) Kenkre	Free Transfer	
1 June 2022	6	DF	(Netherlands) Darren Sidoel	—	Released	
1 June 2022	7	FW	(Croatia) Antonio Perošević	—	Released	
1 June 2022	8	MF	(India) Mohammed Rafique	(India) Chennaiyin	Free Transfer	
1 June 2022	12	DF	(India) Joyner Lourenco	—	Released	
1 June 2022	15	FW	(India) Balwant Singh	—	Released	
1 June 2022	16	MF	(India) Songpu Singsit	(India) Sreenidi Deccan	Free Transfer	
1 June 2022	17	DF	(India) Sarineo Fernandes	(India) Real Kashmir	Free Transfer	
1 June 2022	18	MF	(India) Sourav Das	(India) Chennaiyin	Free Transfer	
1 June 2022	19	DF	(India) Romeo Fernandes	—	Released	
1 June 2022	20	DF	(India) Hira Mondal	(India) Bengaluru	Free Transfer	
1 June 2022	22	MF	(India) Lalrinliana Hnamte	(India) ATK Mohun Bagan	Free Transfer	
1 June 2022	23	MF	(India) Bikash Jairu	—	Released	
1 June 2022	26	DF	(India) Akashdeep Singh Kahlon	—	Released	
1 June 2022	29	GK	(India) Arindam Bhattacharya	(India) NorthEast United	Free Transfer	
1 June 2022	30	DF	(Nepal) Ananta Tamang	(Nepal) Chitwan	Free Transfer	
1 June 2022	33	MF	(India) Loken Meitei	(India) Real Kashmir	Free Transfer	
1 June 2022	43	FW	(India) Siddhant Shirodkar	—	Released	
1 June 2022	45	DF	(India) Saikhom Goutam Singh	—	Released	
1 June 2022	47	DF	(India) Raju Gaikwad	(India) Churchill Brothers	Free Transfer	
1 June 2022	71	DF	(Croatia) Franjo Prce	(Slovenia) Koper	Free Transfer	
1 June 2022	77	MF	(Spain) Fran Sota	(Spain) Logroñés	Free Transfer	
1 June 2022	99	FW	(India) Rahul Paswan	(India) Mohammedan Sporting	Free Transfer	
1 January 2023	9	FW	(Brazil) Eliandro	—	Released	
18 January 2023	7	MF	(India) Aniket Jadhav	(India) Odisha	Undisclosed	
18 February 2023	19	DF	(India) Ankit Mukherjee	—	Released	

== Team ==
=== First-team squad ===
The below list contains the names and details of the first team squad for East Bengal. This list does not contain the players of the reserve team which will be participating in the Calcutta Football League. On 6 October, ahead of the Indian Super League campaign, East Bengal announced the list of captains for the season – Cleiton Silva, Souvik Chakrabarti, Sumeet Passi, Kamaljit Singh and Iván González.

As of 17 April 2023

No.	Name	Nat.	Pos.	Date of Birth (Age)	Signed From	Year	Apps	Goals
Goalkeepers
1	Kamaljit Singh (captain)	(India)	GK	28 December 1995 (age 30)	(India) Odisha	2022	24	0
13	Pawan Kumar	(India)	GK	1 July 1990 (age 36)	(India) Jamshedpur	2022	0	0
25	Suvam Sen	(India)	GK	14 November 1989 (age 36)	(India) United	2021	8	0
32	Naveen Kumar	(India)	GK	10 August 1989 (age 37)	(India) Goa	2022	0	0
Defenders
2	Mohammad Rakip	(India)	RB	14 May 2000 (age 26)	(India) Mumbai City	2022	12	0
4	Iván González (captain)	(Spain)	CB	2 February 1990 (age 36)	(India) Goa	2022	17	0
5	Lalchungnunga	(India)	CB	25 December 2000 (age 25)	(India) Sreenidi Deccan	2022	26	0
16	Sarthak Golui	(India)	CB	3 November 1997 (age 29)	(India) Bengaluru	2022	22	2
17	Jerry Lalrinzuala	(India)	LB	30 July 1998 (age 28)	(India) Chennaiyin	2022	22	0
19	Ankit Mukherjee	(India)	RB	10 July 1996 (age 30)	(India) ATK Mohun Bagan	2020	31	0
33	Pritam Kumar Singh	(India)	LB	10 December 1995 (age 30)	(India) Hyderabad	2022	7	0
34	Nabi Hussain Khan	(India)	CB	1 May 1998 (age 28)	(India) East Bengal Reserves	2022	4	0
37	Tuhin Das	(India)	LB	7 March 2000 (age 26)	(India) East Bengal Reserves	2022	13	0
40	Charalambos Kyriakou	(Cyprus)	RB	15 October 1989 (age 37)	(Cyprus) Doxa Katokopias	2022	24	1
61	Athul Unnikrishnan	(India)	CB	1 February 2000 (age 26)	(India) Kerala United	2022	7	0
Midfielders
6	Sumit Passi (captain)	(India)	RW	12 September 1994 (age 32)	(India) Roundglass Punjab	2022	17	3
8	Amarjit Singh Kiyam	(India)	CM	6 January 2001 (age 25)	(India) Goa	2022	24	0
12	Wahengbam Angousana	(India)	CM	2 February 1996 (age 30)	(India) TRAU	2020	34	0
14	Alex Lima	(Brazil)	CM	15 December 1988 (age 37)	(India) Jamshedpur	2022	24	1
15	Mobashir Rahman	(India)	CM	12 March 1998 (age 28)	(India) Jamshedpur	2022	20	1
18	Himanshu Jangra	(India)	LW	21 July 2004 (age 22)	(India) Delhi	2022	9	0
23	Souvik Chakrabarti (captain)	(India)	CM	12 July 1991 (age 35)	(India) Hyderabad	2022	9	0
24	Jordan O'Doherty	(Australia)	CM	14 October 1997 (age 29)	(Australia) Newcastle Jets	2022	21	1
29	Naorem Mahesh Singh	(India)	LW	1 March 1999 (age 27)	(India) Kerala Blasters	2022	42	7
Forwards
10	Cleiton Silva (captain)	(Brazil)	FW	3 February 1987 (age 39)	(India) Bengaluru	2022	25	14
11	V. P. Suhair	(India)	FW	27 July 1992 (age 34)	(India) NorthEast United	2022	28	8
26	Semboi Haokip	(India)	FW	13 March 1993 (age 33)	(India) Bengaluru	2021	38	4
77	Jake Jervis	(England)	FW	17 September 1991 (age 35)	(India) SJK Seinäjoki	2023	7	1

=== New contracts ===
No.	Pos.	Date	Name	Ref.
12	MF	18 May 2022	(India) Wahengbam Angousana	
19	DF	26 July 2022	(India) Ankit Mukherjee	
26	FW	30 August 2022	(India) Semboi Haokip	
25	GK	31 October 2022	(India) Suvam Sen	
5	DF	25 December 2023	(India) Lalchungnunga	
10	FW	2 March 2023	(Brazil) Cleiton Silva	

=== Promoted from Reserve Squad ===
No.	Pos.	Name	Ref.
34	DF	(India) Nabi Hussain Khan	
37	DF	(India) Tuhin Das	
61	DF	(India) Athul Unnikrishnan	

=== Reserve squad ===
The East Bengal Reserves team, who are not registered in the Indian Super League squad, would be participating in the 2022 Calcutta Premier Division with head coach Bino George taking charge of the team from the sidelines.

As of 1 November 2022

No.	Name	Nat.	Pos.	Date of Birth (Age)	Signed From	Year	Apps	Goals
Goalkeepers
50	Suryash Jaiswal	(India)	GK	19 April 1999 (age 27)	(India) George Telegraph	2022	3	0
65	Muhammed Nishad P	(India)	GK	20 June 2000 (age 26)	(India) Gokulam Kerala	2022	1	0
99	Aditya Patra	(India)	GK	27 April 2000 (age 26)	(India) Bengaluru	2022	0	0
Defenders
51	Subhendu Mandi	(India)	CB	21 September 1998 (age 28)	(India) Railway	2022	0	0
53	Arpan Polley	(India)	RB	12 December 2002 (age 23)	(India) East Bengal U–18	2022	1	0
58	Niranjan Mondal	(India)	LB	6 July 1998 (age 28)	(India) Calcutta Customs	2022	2	0
60	Adil Amal	(India)	RB	31 January 2002 (age 24)	(India) Mar Athanasius Football Academy	2022	1	0
Midfielders
38	Mahitosh Roy	(India)	CM	11 November 1998 (age 28)	(India) George Telegraph	2022	3	0
52	Sanjib Ghosh	(India)	CM	31 July 2000 (age 26)	(India) Mohammedan Sporting	2022	4	0
55	Dip Saha	(India)	CM	10 August 2000 (age 26)	(India) Aryan	2022	4	0
56	Tanmay Das	(India)	CM	2 May 1998 (age 28)	(India) Railway	2022	1	0
59	Vivek Singh	(India)	CM	23 January 2000 (age 26)	(India) George Telegraph	2022	3	1
Forwards
54	Vishnu TM	(India)	FW	27 March 2000 (age 26)	(India) Aryan	2022	3	0
62	Lijo Kurusappan	(India)	FW	8 September 2001 (age 25)	(India) Travancore Royals	2022	2	0
64	Jesin TK	(India)	FW	19 February 2000 (age 26)	(India) Kerala United	2022	4	1
97	Subham Bhowmick	(India)	FW	9 August 1997 (age 29)	(India) Madan Maharaj	2022	4	0

=== Current technical staff ===
East Bengal appointed former India national football team coach Stephen Constantine as the head coach of the team. The club also appointed Santosh Trophy winning Kerala football team coach Bino George as the assistant coach and also shall serve as the head coach of the reserve team that will be participating in the Calcutta Football League. The club appointed Owain Manship as the head of sports science. The club also appointed former Charlton Athletic goalkeeper Andy Petterson as the goalkeeping coach for the team. East Bengal appointed Englishman Sam Baker as the video analyst of the team. The club also roped in former Sarpsborg coach Thórhallur Siggeirsson as the assistant coach of the team. On 2 November 2022, East Bengal announced that they have signed former India national under-20 football team coach Shanmugam Venkatesh as the new assistant coach of the team and Bino George would continue as the head coach of the reserves team.

Position	Name
Head coach	(England) Stephen Constantine
Assistant coach	(Iceland) Thórhallur Siggeirsson
Assistant coach	(India) Shanmugam Venkatesh
Goalkeeping coach	(Australia) Andy Petterson
Head of Sports Science	(Australia) Owain Manship
Video Analyst	(England) Sam Baker
Physio Therapist	(India) Askar PV
Physio Therapist	(India) Shehin Muhammed
Physio Therapist	(India) Nazal Seyd Jifry
Physio Therapist	(India) Mohamed Salah
Team Manager	(India) Pratim Kumar Saha
Team Doctor	(India) Dr. Mustufa Poonawalla
Masseur	(India) Liaqat Ali
Masseur	(India) Suresh V
Reserve Team Head coach	(India) Bino George
Reserve Team Assistant coach	(India) Biswajit Majumdar
Reserve Team Goalkeeping coach	(India) Sangram Mukherjee
Reserve Team Physio Therapist	(India) Md. Ziauddin
Reserve Team Doctor	(India) Dr. Ram Dhal
Chief Technical Officer	(India) Amoy Ghoshal

== Kit ==
East Bengal had launched their new home and away kits before the Durand Cup. Their new kit partners Trak-Only launched the home and away kits on their social media handle ahead of the first game of the season. However, before the Indian Super League season began, the club launched the official kits for the season in gala style at the Rajdanga Naba Uday Sangha Durga Puja ground, on 29 September, with first team players – Souvik Chakrabarti, Cleiton Silva and V. P. Suhair unveiling the kits to the media, in presence of head coach Stephen Constantine.

=== Indian Super League Kits ===
Home	Away	Third	Goalkeeper

=== Durand Cup Kits ===
Home	Away	Goalkeeper

== Preseason and friendlies ==
On 4 August, newly appointed head coach Stephen Constantine arrived in Kolkata and started the pre-season training with the team, joined by the already announced Indian squad at the club ground. Constantine is assisted by Bino George, who also started the pre-season training with the reserve team. After his first training session with the team, Constantine put out a statement saying, "You are not going to want to play against East Bengal". On 11 August, East Bengal announced the signing of three more Indian players, including custodian Kamaljit Singh from Odisha in a hefty transfer after East Bengal agreed to pay the release clause for the goalkeeper. On 12 August, East Bengal announced the signing of five foreign players for the season: three Brazilians — Alex Lima, Cleiton Silva and Eliandro, Spanish defender Ivan González and Cyprus national team defender Charalambos Kyriakou.

East Bengal played their first pre-season friendly game on 16 August against Diamond Harbour at the Naihati Stadium. The club mainly fielded their reserve side along with three members of senior squad as the game ended in a goalless draw. After the Durand Cup exit and as preparation for the Indian Super League, East Bengal played a closed-door friendly against George Telegraph on 18 September at the AIFF National Centre of Excellence and won 3–0 with goals from Naorem Mahesh Singh, V. P. Suhair and Eliandro. On 22 September, East Bengal played Aryan in their second pre-season friendly game before the Indian Super League and won 3–0 again, with Alex Lima, Eliandro and Semboi Haokip scoring for the team. On 25 September, East Bengal played their third friendly match against India under-20 at the AIFF National Centre of Excellence and won 2–0 with goals from Sumeet Passi and Cleiton Silva. On 30 September, East Bengal played Real Kashmir in their fourth friendly game and won 3–0, with Cleiton Silva, Sumeet Passi and Souvik Chakrabarti scoring for the team, thus ending the pre-season for East Bengal before the start of the Indian Super League.

After the end of the Indian Super League campaign, East Bengal started their preparation for the 2023 Indian Super Cup and organized two friendly matches against Mohammedan Sporting and Chennaiyin in Kolkata. On 30 March 2023, East Bengal played Mohammedan at the Salt Lake Stadium Training Ground and won 4–3 with Jake Jervis, Lalchungnunga, Himanshu Jangra and Cleiton Silva scoring for the team.

=== Matches ===
Win Draw Loss

16 August 2022 Friendly	East Bengal	0–0	Diamond Harbour	Naihati
17:30 IST		Report		Stadium: Bankimanjali Stadium; Attendance: 7000; Referee: Tanmoy Dhar; Man of the Match: Debnath Mondal (East Bengal)

18 September 2022 Friendly	East Bengal	3–0	George Telegraph	Rajarhat
09:00 IST	Naorem 15'; Suhair 51'; Eliandro 62'	Report		Stadium: AIFF National Centre of Excellence; Attendance: 0 (Note: Closed door friendly match.)

22 September 2022 Friendly	East Bengal	3–0	Aryan	Rajarhat
15:00 IST	Lima 77'; Eliandro 80' (pen.); Haokip 87'	Report		Stadium: AIFF National Centre of Excellence; Attendance: 0 (Note: Closed door friendly match.); Referee: Dipu Ray

25 September 2022 Friendly	East Bengal	2–0	India U-20	Rajarhat
09:00 IST	Passi 38'; Silva 58'	Report		Stadium: AIFF National Centre of Excellence; Attendance: 0 (Note: Closed door friendly match.)

30 September 2022 Friendly	East Bengal	3–0	Real Kashmir	Rajarhat
15:00 IST	Silva 61'; Passi 76'; Chakrabarti 78'	Report		Stadium: AIFF National Centre of Excellence; Attendance: 0 (Note: Closed door friendly match.); Referee: Robin Biswas

30 March 2023 Friendly	East Bengal	4–3	Mohammedan Sporting	Kolkata
19:00 IST	Jervis; Lalchungnunga; Jangra; Silva (pen.)	Report	Dauda; Rakip (o.g.); Vaz	Stadium: Salt Lake Stadium; Attendance: 0

2 April 2023 Friendly	East Bengal	0–1	Chennaiyin	Kolkata
15:30 IST			Karikari 81'	Stadium: Salt Lake Stadium; Attendance: 0

== Competitions ==
=== Overall record ===
Competition	First match	Last match	Starting round	Final position	Record							
Competition	First match	Last match	Starting round	Final position	Pld	W	D	L	GF	GA	GD	Win %
Durand Cup	22 August 2022	3 September 2022	Group stage	Group Stage	4	1	2	1	4	4	+0	25.00
Indian Super League	7 October 2022	25 February 2023	Matchweek 1	9th	20	6	1	13	22	38	−16	30.00
Super Cup	9 April 2023	17 April 2023	Group stage	Group Stage	3	0	3	0	6	6	+0	0.00
Calcutta Football League (Note: East Bengal fielded mostly their Reserve team for the tournament, with Bino George taking charge as the head coach.)	25 September 2022	1 November 2022	Super Six	4th	4	0	3	1	2	4	−2	0.00
Total					31	7	9	15	34	52	−18	22.58

Last updated: 17 April 2023
Source: Soccerway

=== Durand Cup ===
East Bengal participated in the 2022 Durand Cup after being absent in the previous two editions of the tournament. East Bengal was drawn in group B alongside ATK Mohun Bagan, Mumbai City, Rajasthan United and Indian Navy. East Bengal began their campaign on 22 August against Indian Navy at the Salt Lake Stadium. In the opening game, East Bengal played out a goalless draw against the Indian Navy and settled for one point. East Bengal faced Rajasthan United in the second game of the group on 25 August at the Kishore Bharati Krirangan and once again settled for a goalless draw. Goalkeeper Kamaljit Singh saved a penalty in the second half to keep the clean sheet as East Bengal managed two points from as many games in the group. East Bengal faced ATK Mohun Bagan in their third game of the group on 28 August at the Salt Lake Stadium and suffered a 0–1 defeat courtesy of an own goal from Sumeet Passi in the dying minutes of the first half. After ATK Mohun Bagan won their fixture against Indian Navy on 31 August, East Bengal were officially eliminated from the tournament with a game to play. In the final game of the group stage, East Bengal ended their campaign with their first victory of the season, as they defeated Mumbai City 4–3 at the Kishore Bharati Krirangan on 3 September. Sumeet Passi and Cleiton Silva scored a brace each for East Bengal while Lallianzuala Chhangte got a brace and Greg Stewart scored the other for Mumbai in a seven-goal thriller win for East Bengal.

==== Group stage ====
Pos	Team	Pld	W	D	L	GF	GA	GD	Pts	Qualification	MCI	RUN	AMB	EAB	INA
1	Mumbai City	4	2	1	1	13	7	+6	7 (Note: Head-to-head points: Mumbai City 4, Rajasthan United 3, Mohun Bagan 1.)	Qualify for the Knockout stage	—	5–1	—	—	4–1
2	Rajasthan United	4	2	1	1	6	7	−1	7	Qualify for the Knockout stage	—	—	—	—	2–0
3	Mohun Bagan (H)	4	2	1	1	6	4	+2	7		1–1	2–3	—	—	2–0
4	East Bengal (H)	4	1	2	1	4	4	0	5		4–3	0–0	0–1	—	0–0
5	Indian Navy	4	0	1	3	1	8	−7	1		—	—	—	—	—

Source: Sportstar
Rules for classification: 1) points; 2) head-to-head points; 3) head-to-head goal difference; 4) goal difference; 5) number of goals scored; 6) drawing of lots
(H) Hosts

==== Matches ====
Win Draw Loss Void

22 August 2022 Group stage	East Bengal	0–0	Indian Navy	Kolkata
18:00 IST	Mukherjee (yellow card) 62'	Report	Mahata (yellow card) 60'	Stadium: Salt Lake Stadium; Attendance: 10,000; Referee: Lakshay Tushir; Man of the Match: Harikrishna AU (Indian Navy)

25 August 2022 Group stage	East Bengal	0–0	Rajasthan United	Kolkata
18:00 IST	Lima (yellow card) 59'; González (yellow card) 79'; Rahman (yellow card) 90+5'	Report	Mambetaliev (yellow card) 13'; Amangeldiev (yellow card) 53'; Barboza (penalty missed) 62'; Pauliankhum (yellow card) 85'	Stadium: Kishore Bharati Krirangan; Attendance: 12,000; Referee: Crystal John; Man of the Match: Melroy Assisi (Rajasthan United)

28 August 2022 Group Stage	East Bengal	0–1	ATK Mohun Bagan	Kolkata
18:00 IST	González (yellow card) 90+1'	Report	Boumous (yellow card) 39'; McHugh (yellow card) 44'; Passi 45+2' (o.g.); Rai (yellow card) 47'; Manvir (yellow card) 79'	Stadium: Salt Lake Stadium; Attendance: 60,000; Referee: C R Srikrishna; Man of the Match: Carl McHugh (ATK Mohun Bagan)

3 September 2022 Group stage	East Bengal	4–3	Mumbai City	Kolkata
18:00 IST	Passi 17', 34'; Silva 22', 81'; Chakrabarti (yellow card) 45'; Singh (yellow card) 60'	Report	Stewart (yellow card) 7' (goal) 27'; Gill (yellow card) 7'; Chhangte 36', 43'; Singh (yellow card) 58'; Nawaz (yellow card) 87'; Noguera (yellow card) 90'	Stadium: Kishore Bharati Krirangan; Attendance: 12,000; Referee: Rahul Kumar Gupta; Man of the Match: Cleiton Silva (East Bengal)

=== Indian Super League ===
==== Summary ====
The 2022-23 Indian Super League will be played across the country in home and away formats after two seasons of hosting it in Goa due to the COVID-19 pandemic. The fixtures were released on 1 September with the league set to begin on 7 October 2022; with East Bengal featuring in the opening fixture against Kerala Blasters away at Kochi. On 5 October, East Bengal announced their 27-man squad for the Indian Super League, that included six foreign players led by coach Stephen Constantine.

On 7 October, East Bengal started their campaign with a 3–1 defeat against the runners-up of last season Kerala Blasters at the Jawaharlal Nehru Stadium in Kochi. Adrián Luna scored in the second half in the seventy-second minute to put the home team ahead and then Ivan Kalyuzhnyi scored in the eighty-second minute to double the lead for Kerala. Alex Lima reduced the margin for East Bengal in the eighty-seventh minute but Kalyuzhnyi scored again just two minutes later as East Bengal suffered a defeat in the opening match. East Bengal faced Goa on 12 October at home in the Salt Lake Stadium in their second match and suffered a 1–2 defeat courtesy of an injury time winner from Edu Bedia. Brandon Fernandes opened the scoring for Goa in the eighth minute while Cleiton Silva had equalized for East Bengal from a penalty in the sixty-fourth minute. On 20 October, East Bengal registered their first win of the campaign as they defeated NorthEast United 1–3 away at the Indira Gandhi Athletic Stadium in Guwahati. Cleiton Silva opened the scoring for East Bengal in the eleventh minute, Charalambos Kyriakou scored the second in the fifty-second minute, Jordan O'Doherty scored the third in the eighty-fourth minute while Matt Derbyshire scored one for NorthEast United in the injury time to reduce the margin only as a consolation, as East Bengal secured their first three points. On 29 October, East Bengal faced ATK Mohun Bagan in their fourth match at the Salt Lake Stadium in the first leg of the Kolkata Derby and suffered a 2–0 defeat. Hugo Boumous scored the first for ATK Mohun Bagan in the fifty-sixth minute and Manvir Singh scored the second in the sixty-fifth minute, as East Bengal suffered their third loss in the campaign.

On 4 November, East Bengal faced Chennaiyin at the Salt Lake Stadium and suffered a 1–0 defeat. Vafa Hakhamaneshi scored the only goal of the match in the sixty-ninth minute of the game with a header from inside the box from a corner-kick, as East Bengal suffered their fourth defeat in five matches in the league. Vafa of Chennaiyin and Sarthak Golui of East Bengal were given marching orders in the second half after both received double bookings in the match. On 11 November, East Bengal secured their second win of the campaign as they defeated Bengaluru 1–0 away at the Sree Kanteerava Stadium with Cleiton Silva scoring the only goal of the match in the sixty-ninth minute, as East Bengal moved to the eighth place with six points in six matches. Coach Stephen Constantine dedicated the win to late East Bengal fan Joy Shankar Saha who died during the match against ATK Mohun Bagan on 29 October. On 18 November, East Bengal faced Odisha at the Salt Lake Stadium and suffered a 4–2 defeat. East Bengal lead 2–0 at halftime after Semboi Haokip and Naorem Mahesh Singh had scored for the team but Odisha rallied from behind in the second half to score four goals, Pedro Martín scored twice, Jerry Mawihmingthanga scored the third and Nandhakumar Sekar scored the fourth as East Bengal suffered their fifth defeat of the campaign. On 27 November 2022, East Bengal registered their third victory of the campaign as they defeated Jamshedpur 3–1 away at the JRD Tata Sports Complex in Jamshedpur. V. P. Suhair scored the opener in just ninety-three seconds, scoring the fastest goal of the season while Cleiton Silva scored a brace, with all three goals being assisted by Naorem Mahesh Singh, who became the first Indian player to do so in the Indian Super League; Jay Emmanuel-Thomas scored the only goal for Jamshedpur from the spot.

On 9 December, East Bengal faced the defending champions Hyderabad at the G. M. C. Balayogi Athletic Stadium and suffered a 2–0 defeat. Mohammad Yasir scored the opening goal in the thirty-eighth minute for Hyderabad and Javier Siverio scored the second in the eighty-fifth minute to double the lead as East Bengal suffered their sixth defeat of the campaign. On 16 December, East Bengal faced Mumbai City at the Salt Lake Stadium and suffered a 3–0 defeat. Lalengmawia Ralte scored twice and Greg Stewart scored the other as East Bengal suffered their seventh defeat of the campaign. On 25 December, East Bengal announced that defender Lalchungnunga who was on loan from Sreenidi Deccan, has been signed permanently until 2026. On 30 December, East Bengal faced Bengaluru at the Salt Lake Stadium and won 2–0 with Cleiton Silva scoring a brace including an injury time winner at the ninety-third minute from thirty-five yards with a free-kick. Cleiton Silva opened the scoring in the thirty-ninth minute with a penalty but Javi Hernández equalized for Bengaluru in the fifty-fifth minute. Cleiton scored the winner late in the game as East Bengal won their fourth match of the campaign and completed a league double over Bengaluru this season.

On 7 January, East Bengal faced Odisha away at the Kalinga Stadium in Bhubaneshwar and lost 3–1. Cleiton Silva opened the scoring for East Bengal in the tenth minute but Odisha rallied from behind to score three goals, with Diego Maurício grabbing a brace and Nandhakumar Sekar scoring the other as East Bengal suffered their eighth defeat of the campaign. On 9 January, East Bengal was imposed another transfer ban by FIFA, in effect from 1 January 2023, for the non-payment of dues for Iranian forward Omid Singh. On 13 January, East Bengal faced Jamshedpur at the Salt Lake Stadium and lost 2–1. Cleiton Silva scored for East Bengal to give the lead in the first half but Harry Sawyer and Ritwik Das scored for Jamshedpur in the second half as East Bengal suffered back-to-back defeats. On 20 January, East Bengal faced Hyderabad at the Salt Lake Stadium and suffered a 2–0 defeat. Javier Siverio and Aaren D'Silva scored for Hyderabad as East Bengal lost their third consecutive game. On 26 January, the imposed transfer ban was lifted by FIFA after the club cleared off the dues for Omid Singh and they received a no-objection-certificate from the player. On 26 January, East Bengal faced Goa away at the Fatorda Stadium and suffered a 4–2 defeat. Iker Guarrotxena scored a hattrick and Brandon Fernandes scored the fourth for Goa while V.P. Suhair and Sarthak Golui reduced the margin for East Bengal as they suffered their fourth defeat in succession. On 27 January, East Bengal announced the signing of English forward Jake Jervis as a replacement for Eliandro.

On 3 February, East Bengal faced Kerala Blasters at the Salt Lake Stadium and won 1–0 courtesy of the solitary goal by Cleiton Silva, who scored his tenth goal of the campaign and helped East Bengal pick up their fifth win in the Indian Super League season. On 8 February 2023, East Bengal faced NorthEast United at the Salt Lake Stadium and drew 3–3 to grab their first draw of the season. Cleiton Silva scored a brace and Jake Jervis scored one for East Bengal while Parthib Sundar Gogoi, Jithin M. S. and Imran Khan scored for NorthEast United. On 13 February, East Bengal faced Chennaiyin away at the Jawaharlal Nehru Stadium in Chennai and lost 2–0. Lalchungnunga scored an own goal while Rahim Ali scored the second for Chennaiyin as East Bengal suffered their twelfth defeat of the campaign. On 19 February, East Bengal faced the Shield Champions Mumbai City at the Mumbai Football Arena and won 1–0 with Naorem Mahesh Singh scoring the solitary goal of the match in the fifty-second minute as East Bengal grabbed their sixth win of the campaign and reached nineteen points, the highest ever for East Bengal in the Indian Super League since their debut in 2020. On 25 February, East Bengal faced ATK Mohun Bagan in the last match of the campaign and suffered a 2–0 defeat. Slavko Damjanović and Dimitri Petratos scored for ATK Mohun Bagan as East Bengal suffered their thirteenth defeat and finished the season in the ninth position with nineteen points.

==== League table ====
Pos	Team	Pld	W	D	L	GF	GA	GD	Pts
7	Goa	20	8	3	9	36	35	+1	27 (Note: Head-to-head points: Goa 3, Chennaiyin 3. Head-to-head goal difference: Goa +1, Chennaiyin -1.)
8	Chennaiyin	20	7	6	7	36	37	−1	27
9	East Bengal	20	6	1	13	22	38	−16	19 (Note: Head-to-head points: East Bengal 3, Jamshedpur 3. Head-to-head goal difference: East Bengal +1, Jamshedpur -1.)
10	Jamshedpur	20	5	4	11	21	32	−11	19
11	NorthEast United	20	1	2	17	20	55	−35	5

Source: Indian Super League
Rules for classification: 1) points; 2) head-to-head points; 3) head-to-head goal difference; 4) head-to-head goals scored; 5) goal difference; 6) number of goals scored; 7) fair play ranking; 8) drawing of lots

==== Result summary ====
Overall								Home						Away					
Pld	W	D	L	GF	GA	GD	Pts	W	D	L	GF	GA	GD	W	D	L	GF	GA	GD
20	6	1	13	22	38	−16	19	2	1	7	10	20	−10	4	0	6	12	18	−6

==== Results by match ====
Match	1	2	3	4	5	6	7	8	9	10	11	12	13	14	15	16	17	18	19	20
Ground	A	H	A	A	H	A	H	A	A	H	H	A	H	H	A	H	H	A	A	H
Result	L	L	W	L	L	W	L	W	L	L	W	L	L	L	L	W	D	L	W	L
Position	11	10	7	8	10	8	8	8	8	8	8	9	9	9	9	9	9	9	9	9

Updated to match(es) played on 25 February 2023. Source: indiansuperleague.com
A = Away; H = Home; W = Win; D = Draw; L = Loss

==== Matches ====
The league fixtures were announced on 1 September 2022, with the season starting on 7 October.

Win Draw Loss Void

7 October 2022 Round 1	Kerala Blasters	3–1	East Bengal	Kochi
19:30 IST	Luna 72'; Ruivah (yellow card) 78'; Kalyuzhnyi 82', 89'	Report; AIFF Report	Lalchungnunga (yellow card) 61'; Mukherjee (yellow card) 63'; Lima 88'	Stadium: Jawaharlal Nehru Stadium; Attendance: 34,978; Referee: C. R. Srikrishna; Man of the Match: Ivan Kaliuzhnyi (Kerala Blasters)

12 October 2022 Round 2	East Bengal	1–2	Goa	Kolkata
19:30 IST	Lalchungnunga (yellow card) 17'; Silva (yellow card) 56' (goal) 64' (pen.); Suhair (yellow card) 67'; González (yellow card) 83'	Report; AIFF Report	Fernandes 8'; Tlang (yellow card) 45+1'; Bedia 90+4'	Stadium: Salt Lake Stadium; Attendance: 17,500; Referee: Harish Kundu; Man of the Match: Edu Bedia (Goa)

20 October 2022 Round 3	NorthEast United	1–3	East Bengal	Guwahati
19:30 IST	Derbyshire 90+2'	Report; AIFF Report	Silva 11'; Kyriakou 52'; O'Doherty 84'	Stadium: Indira Gandhi Athletic Stadium; Attendance: 7,315; Referee: Ashwin; Man of the Match: Charalambos Kyriakou (East Bengal)

29 October 2022 Round 4	ATK Mohun Bagan	2–0	East Bengal	Kolkata
19:30 IST	Boumous 56'; Singh 65'	Report; AIFF Report	Kyriakou (yellow card) 27'	Stadium: Salt Lake Stadium; Attendance: 62,542; Referee: C. R. Srikrishna; Man of the Match: Hugo Boumous (ATK Mohun Bagan)

4 November 2022 Round 5	East Bengal	0–1	Chennaiyin	Kolkata
19:30 IST	Golui (yellow card) 5' (yellow-red card) 75'; Kamaljit (yellow card) 59'	Report; AIFF Report	Vafa (yellow card) 60' (yellow-red card) 70' (goal) 69'; Düker (yellow card) 90'	Stadium: Salt Lake Stadium; Attendance: 17,170; Referee: Umesh Bora; Man of the Match: Anirudh Thapa (Chennaiyin)

11 November 2022 Round 6	Bengaluru	0–1	East Bengal	Bengaluru
19:30 IST	Kumam (yellow card) 52'	Report; AIFF Report	Suhair (yellow card) 27'; Silva 69'; Lalrinzuala (yellow card) 76'; Mahesh (yellow card) 82'	Stadium: Sree Kanteerava Stadium; Attendance: 12,817; Referee: Harish Kundu; Man of the Match: Cleiton Silva (East Bengal)

18 November 2022 Round 7	East Bengal	2–4	Odisha	Kolkata
19:30 IST	Haokip 23'; Mahesh 35'; González (yellow card) 45+2'	Report; AIFF Report	Martín 47', 48'; Moirangthem (yellow card) 50'; Mawihmingthanga 65'; Sekar 76'	Stadium: Salt Lake Stadium; Attendance: 17,772; Referee: Jamal Mohamed; Man of the Match: Pedro Martín (Odisha)

27 November 2022 Round 8	Jamshedpur	1–3	East Bengal	Jamshedpur
19:30 IST	Hartley (yellow card) 26'; Emmanuel-Thomas 40' (pen.); Renthlei (yellow card) 45+1'; Singh (yellow card) 70'	Report; AIFF Report	Suhair 2' (yellow card) 37'; Silva 26', 58'; Lalchungnunga (yellow card) 29'	Stadium: JRD Tata Sports Complex; Attendance: 18,893; Referee: Crystal John; Man of the Match: Naorem Mahesh Singh (East Bengal)

9 December 2022 Round 9	Hyderabad	2–0	East Bengal	Hyderabad
19:30 IST	Yasir 38'; Siverio 85'	Report; AIFF Report	Lalrinzuala (yellow card) 15'	Stadium: G.M.C. Balayogi Athletic Stadium; Attendance: 5,196; Referee: Senthil Nathan S Man of the Match: Mohammad Yasir (Hyderabad)

16 December 2022 Round 10	East Bengal	0–3	Mumbai City	Kolkata
19:30 IST	Silva (yellow card) 41'; Chakrabarti (yellow card) 65'	Report; AIFF Report	Ralte 26', 59'; Stewart 50' (yellow card) 63'; Singh (penalty missed) 86'	Stadium: Salt Lake Stadium; Attendance: 8,079; Referee: Tejas Nagvenkar; Man of the Match: Greg Stewart (Mumbai City)

30 December 2022 Round 11	East Bengal	2–1	Bengaluru	Kolkata
19:30 IST	Silva 39', 90+3'; Rahman (yellow card) 56'; Suhair (yellow card) 60'; Sen (yellow card) 74'; Lima (yellow card) 78'	Report; AIFF Report	Pérez (yellow card) 15'; Wangjam (yellow card) 18'; Hernández (yellow card) 39' (goal) 55'; Bhat (yellow card) 90+2'	Stadium: Salt Lake Stadium; Attendance: 9,137; Referee: Rahul Kumar Gupta; Man of the Match: Cleiton Silva (East Bengal)

7 January 2023 Round 12	Odisha	3–1	East Bengal	Bhubaneshwar
19:30 IST	Maurício 22', 53'; Sekar 45+2'	Report; AIFF Report	Silva 10'; Kyriakou (yellow card) 75'; Mukherjee (yellow card) 90+1'	Stadium: Kalinga Stadium; Attendance: 5,817; Referee: R Venkatesh; Man of the Match: Diego Maurício (Odisha)

13 January 2023 Round 13	East Bengal	1–2	Jamshedpur	Kolkata
19:30 IST	Silva 12' (yellow card) 70'; Lima (yellow card) 77'	Report; AIFF Report	Sawyer 58'; Chaudhari (yellow card) 66'; Das 85'	Stadium: Salt Lake Stadium; Attendance: 6,758; Referee: Aditya Purkayastha; Man of the Match: Ritwik Das (Jamshedpur)

20 January 2023 Round 14	East Bengal	0–2	Hyderabad	Kolkata
19:30 IST	Rakip (yellow card) 13'; Suhair (yellow card) 83'	Report; AIFF Report	Siverio 9'; D'Silva 90+3'	Stadium: Salt Lake Stadium; Attendance: 3,251; Referee: A Rowan; Man of the Match: Nim Dorjee (Hyderabad)

26 January 2023 Round 15	Goa	4–2	East Bengal	Margao
19:30 IST	Guarrotxena 11', 21', 23' (yellow card) 90+9'; Bedia (yellow card) 45+1'; Fernandes 53'; Vázquez (yellow card) 90+5'	Report; AIFF Report	Suhair (yellow card) 45' (goal) 59'; Lalchungnunga (yellow card) 52'; Golui 66'; Das (yellow card) 68'; Passi (yellow card) 90+7'	Stadium: Fatorda Stadium; Attendance: 7,949; Referee: I Jamal Mohamed; Man of the Match: Iker Guarrotxena (Goa)

3 February 2023 Round 16	East Bengal	1–0	Kerala Blasters	Kolkata
19:30 IST	Lima (yellow card) 45'; Rahman (yellow card) 48' (yellow-red card) 90+5'; Suhair (yellow card) 70'; Silva 77'; Passi (yellow card) 86'	Report; AIFF Report	Jeakson (yellow card) 53'; Khabra (yellow card) 58'; Nishu (yellow card) 90+3'	Stadium: Vivekananda Yuba Bharati Krirangan; Attendance: 2,575; Referee: Ashwin; Man of the Match: Cleiton Silva (East Bengal)

8 February 2023 Round 17	East Bengal	3–3	NorthEast United	Kolkata
19:30 IST	Silva 10', 64' (pen.); Rakip (yellow card) 32'; Jervis 45'; Lima (yellow card) 71'; Doherty (yellow card) 85'	Report; AIFF Report	Shereef (yellow card) 25'; Gogoi 30'; Jithin 32'; Gogoi (yellow card) 63'; Imran 85'	Stadium: Salt Lake Stadium; Attendance: 1,982; Referee: Rahul Kumar Gupta; Man of the Match: Cleiton Silva (East Bengal)

12 February 2023 Round 18	Chennaiyin	2–0	East Bengal	Chennai
19:30 IST	Lalchungnunga 48' (o.g.); Ali 87'	Report; AIFF Report	Passi (yellow card) 82'	Stadium: Jawaharlal Nehru Stadium; Attendance: 5,248; Referee: Harish Kundu; Man of the Match: Anirudh Thapa (Chennaiyin)

19 February 2023 Round 19	Mumbai City	0–1	East Bengal	Mumbai
19:30 IST		Report; AIFF Report	Lalrinzuala (yellow card) 50'; Mahesh 52'	Stadium: Mumbai Football Arena; Attendance: 5,212; Referee: Tejas Nagvenkar; Man of the Match: Naorem Mahesh Singh (East Bengal)

25 February 2023 Round 20	East Bengal	0–2	ATK Mohun Bagan	Kolkata
19:30 IST	Suhair (yellow card) 36'; Lima (yellow card) 41'; Silva (yellow card) 70'; Passi (yellow card) 90+1'	Report; AIFF Report	Boumous (yellow card) 38'; Damjanović 68' (yellow card) 69'; Petratos 90'	Stadium: Salt Lake Stadium; Attendance: 60,102; Referee: Cystal John; Man of the Match: Slavko Damjanović (ATK Mohun Bagan)

=== Super Cup ===
East Bengal along with the other ten Indian Super League teams and nine I-League teams participated in the Super Cup, which was held in Kerala in April 2023. The fixtures were announced on 7 March 2023 and East Bengal was grouped in Group B alongside Indian Super League sides – Hyderabad, Odisha and an I-League side Aizawl. The group stage matches for Group B were played at the Payyanad Stadium in Manjeri, Kerala. On 9 April, East Bengal faced Odisha in the first match of the campaign and played a 1–1 draw. Mobashir Rahman put East Bengal ahead in the first half however, Nandhakumar Sekar equalized for Odisha in the second half as both teams shared the points. On 13 April, East Bengal faced Hyderabad and drew 3–3. Naorem Mahesh Singh scored twice and V. P. Suhair scored for East Bengal as they led 3–1 at halftime but Hyderabad came back with Javier Siverio scoring twice and Abdul Rabeeh scoring the third as both teams settled for a point each. On 17 April, in the last match of the group stage, East Bengal faced Aizawl and ended their campaign with a 2–2 draw, hence eventually getting eliminated from the tournament. Naorem Mahesh and Sumeet Passi scored for East Bengal but H.K. Lalhruaitluanga and David Lalhlansanga scored for Aizawl as East Bengal settled for another draw to end the season.

==== Group stage ====
Pos	Team	Pld	W	D	L	GF	GA	GD	Pts	Qualification	OFC	HYD	EAB	AIZ
1	Odisha	3	2	1	0	6	2	+4	7	Advance to knockout stage	—	—	1–1	—
2	Hyderabad	3	1	1	1	6	6	0	4		1–2	—	—	2–1
3	East Bengal	3	0	3	0	6	6	0	3		—	3–3	—	2–2
4	Aizawl	3	0	1	2	3	7	−4	1		0–3	—	—	—

Source: AIFF
Rules for classification: 1) points; 2) head-to-head points; 3) head-to-head goal difference; 4) goal difference; 5) number of goals scored; 6) drawing of lots

==== Matches ====
The fixtures were announced on 7 March 2023.

Win Draw Loss Void

9 April 2023 Group Stage	Odisha	1–1	East Bengal	Manjeri
20:30 IST	Mawihmingthanga (yellow card) 45'; Rebello (yellow card) 54'; Sekar 73'	Report; Report; Match Summary	Rahman 38'	Stadium: Payyanad Stadium; Attendance: 3,412; Referee: Rahul Kumar Gupta; Man of the Match: Diego Mauricio (Odisha)

13 April 2023 Group Stage	East Bengal	3–3	Hyderabad	Manjeri
20:30 IST	Mahesh 4', 45'; Suhair 17'; Jervis (yellow card) 42'; Singh (yellow card) 73'	Report; Report; Match Summary	Siverio 11', 71' (yellow card) 90'; Rabeeh 83'	Stadium: Payyanad Stadium; Attendance: 3,772; Referee: Rowan Arumughan; Man of the Match: Javier Siverio (Odisha)

17 April 2023 Group Stage	East Bengal	2–2	Aizawl	Manjeri
17:00 IST	Mahesh 17' (yellow card) 49'; Passi 21'; Golui (yellow card) 61'; Silva (yellow card) 90+6'	Report; Report; Match Summary	Lalhruaitluanga 42'; Lalramsanga (yellow card) 45'; Lalhlansanga 48'	Stadium: Payyanad Stadium; Attendance: 113; Referee: Venkatesh R Man of the Match: David Lalhlansanga (Aizawl)

=== Calcutta Football League ===
East Bengal participated in the 2022-23 Calcutta Premier Division after being absent last year due to issues with their previous investor group. East Bengal started their campaign from the super six stages of the Premier A division, along with the other big two ATK Mohun Bagan and Mohammedan Sporting. Bhawanipore, Aryan and Kidderpore are the other three teams who qualified for the super six stages. The fixtures for the Super-Six were released on 21 September and East Bengal is set to begin their campaign against Aryan on 25 September at the Bankimanjali Stadium at Naihati. ATK Mohun Bagan withdrew their name from the tournament, while East Bengal fielded their Reserve squad for the tournament as the fixtures got clashed with the Indian Super League.

On 25 September, East Bengal began their campaign with a 0–0 draw against Kidderpore at the Bankimanjali Stadium at Naihati. Bino George took charge of the team from the sidelines as the reserve squad took the field. East Bengal was supposed to play their second match against Aryan on 28 September at Naihati but the match was abandoned due to heavy rainfalls. The match was rescheduled and was played at the same venue on 15 October. East Bengal drew the match 1–1 with Jesin TK scoring in the thirty-ninth minute for East Bengal while Amarnath Baskey equalised for Aryan in the fifty-first minute as East Bengal settle for another draw. On 26 October, East Bengal faced Bhawanipore and suffered a 2–0 defeat at the Kalyani Stadium. Jiten Murmu and Gnohere Krizo scored for Bhawanipore. On 30 October, Mohammedan Sporting were crowned the champions of the tournament, even before the game against East Bengal, after Bhawanipore drew 1–1 with Aryan. On 1 November, East Bengal faced Mohammedan Sporting at the Kishore Bharati Krirangan and drew 1–1 as they ended the Calcutta Football League campaign without a win in the fourth position. Vivek Singh opened the scoring for East Bengal in the thirty-fourth minute but Faslu Rahman equalized for Mohammedan in the ninetieth minute as the game ended in a stalemate.

==== League table ====
Pos	Team	Pld	W	D	L	GF	GA	GD	Pts	Qualification
1	Mohammedan (C)	4	3	1	0	10	1	+9	10	Champions
2	Bhawanipore	4	2	1	1	7	5	+2	7	Eligible for I-League 2 (Note: If the top teams are already playing in national leagues, then the next highest ranked team(s) would be eligible for I-League 2.)
3	Aryan	4	1	2	1	4	6	−2	5	Eligible for I-League 2
4	East Bengal	4	0	3	1	2	4	−2	3	
5	Kidderpore	4	0	1	3	2	9	−7	1	
6	ATK Mohun Bagan	0	0	0	0	0	0	0	0	Withdrew

Updated to match(es) played on 1 November. Source: Soccerway
Rules for classification: 1) points; 2) goal difference; 3) number of goals scored; 4) head-to-head points; 5) head-to-head goal difference; 6) fair play ranking; 7) drawing of lots
(C) Champions

==== Results by match ====
Match	1	2	3	4
Ground	H	A	H	A
Result	D	D	L	D
Position	2	2	4	4

Source: Soccerway
A = Away; H = Home; W = Win; D = Draw; L = Loss

==== Matches ====
The league fixtures were announced on 21 September 2022.

Win Draw Loss Void

25 September 2022 Super Six	East Bengal	0–0	Kidderpore	Naihati
14:30 IST	Mondal (yellow card) 69'; Khan (yellow card) 81'	Report; KF Live	Mondal (yellow card) 12'	Stadium: Bankimanjali Stadium; Attendance: 5000; Referee: Pratik Mondal; Man of the Match: Priyant Singh (Kidderpore)

28 September 2022 Super Six	Aryan	Abandoned	East Bengal	Naihati
14:30 IST		Report		Stadium: Bankimanjali Stadium; Referee: Pranjal Banerjee
Note: Match abandoned due to heavy rainfall.

15 October 2022 Super Six	Aryan	1–1	East Bengal	Naihati
14:30 IST	Baskey 51'	Report; KF Live	Jesin 39'; Khan (yellow card) 42'; Mukherjee (yellow card) 63'	Stadium: Bankimanjali Stadium; Attendance: 2,000; Referee: Dipu Ray; Man of the Match: Jesin TK (East Bengal)

26 October 2022 Super Six	Bhawanipore	2–0	East Bengal	Kalyani
14:30 IST	Murmu 23'; Gharami (yellow card) 53'; Krizo 72'	KF Live	Kiyam (yellow card) 35'	Stadium: Kalyani Stadium; Attendance: 500; Referee: Tanmoy Dhar; Man of the Match: Jiten Murmu (Bhawanipore)

1 November 2022 Super Six	East Bengal	1–1	Mohammedan Sporting	Kolkata
14:30 IST	Singh 34' (yellow card) 57'; Vishnu (yellow card) 76'; Nishad (yellow card) 88'	Report; KF Live	Chhakchhuak (yellow card) 76'; Faslu 90'	Stadium: Kishore Bharati Krirangan; Attendance: 3,000; Referee: Pratik Mondal; Man of the Match: Faslu Rahman (Mohammedan Sporting)

— Super Six	ATK Mohun Bagan	Cancelled	East Bengal	—
Note: ATK Mohun Bagan withdrew from the tournament.

== Statistics ==
=== Appearances ===
Players with no appearances are not included in the list.

As of 17 April 2023

Appearances for East Bengal in 2022–23 season
No.	Pos.	Nat.	Name	Durand Cup		Indian Super League		Super Cup		Calcutta League		Total	
No.	Pos.	Nat.	Name	Apps	Starts	Apps	Starts	Apps	Starts	Apps	Starts	Apps	Starts
Goalkeepers
1	GK	(India)	Kamaljit Singh	4	4	17	17	3	3	—		24	24
25	GK	(India)	Suvam Sen	—		3	3	0	0	—		3	3
50	GK	(India)	Suryash Jaiswal	—						3	3	3	3
65	GK	(India)	Muhammed Nishad P	—						1	1	1	1
Defenders
2	RB	(India)	Mohammad Rakip	3	1	6	2	1	0	2	2	12	5
4	CB	(Spain)	Iván González	2	1	15	14	0	0	—		17	15
5	CB	(India)	Lalchungnunga	4	4	19	19	3	3	—		26	26
16	CB	(India)	Sarthak Golui	1	0	13	10	3	3	—		17	13
17	LB	(India)	Jerry Lalrinzuala	3	3	19	16	0	0	—		22	19
19	RB	(India)	Ankit Mukherjee	2	2	10	9	—		1	1	13	12
33	LB	(India)	Pritam Kumar Singh	3	3	2	1	0	0	2	2	7	6
34	CB	(India)	Nabi Hussain Khan	0	0	0	0	—		4	4	4	4
37	LB	(India)	Tuhin Das	2	1	8	2	3	3	—		13	6
40	CB	(Cyprus)	Charalambos Kyriakou	3	3	18	15	3	2	—		24	20
53	RB	(India)	Arpan Polley	—						1	0	1	0
58	LB	(India)	Niranjan Mondal	—						2	2	2	2
60	RB	(India)	Adil Amal	—						1	1	1	1
61	CB	(India)	Athul Unnikrishnan	—		1	0	2	2	4	4	7	6
Midfielders
6	RW	(India)	Sumit Passi	4	4	11	4	2	1	—		17	9
7	RW	(India)	Aniket Jadhav (Note: Players who left East Bengal, either on loan or permanently, during the season)	3	2	6	0	—		1	1	10	3
8	CM	(India)	Amarjit Singh Kiyam	4	2	1	0	0	0	3	3	8	5
12	CM	(India)	Wahengbam Angousana	2	2	1	—		0	3	3	6	5
14	CM	(Brazil)	Alex Lima	4	3	17	13	3	3	—		24	19
15	CM	(India)	Mobashir Rahman	3	1	13	9	3	3	1	1	20	14
18	LW	(India)	Himanshu Jangra	2	0	6	1	1	0	—		9	1
23	CM	(India)	Souvik Chakrabarti	4	2	5	3	0	0	—		9	5
24	CM	(Australia)	Jordan O'Doherty	0	0	18	13	3	0	—		21	13
29	RW	(India)	Naorem Mahesh Singh	2	1	19	18	3	3	—		24	22
38	CM	(India)	Mahitosh Roy	1	0	—				2	1	3	1
52	CM	(India)	Sanjib Ghosh	—						4	2	4	2
55	CM	(India)	Dip Saha	—						4	3	4	3
56	CM	(India)	Tanmoy Das	—						1	0	1	0
59	CM	(India)	Vivek Singh	—						3	2	3	2
Forwards
9	FW	(Brazil)	Eliandro	3	1	7	0	—				10	1
10	FW	(Brazil)	Cleiton Silva	2	1	20	20	3	3	—		25	24
11	FW	(India)	V.P. Suhair	2	2	18	18	3	2	—		23	22
26	FW	(India)	Semboi Haokip	1	1	15	8	1	0	1	1	18	10
54	FW	(India)	Vishnu TM	—						3	1	3	1
62	FW	(India)	Lijo Kurusappan	—						2	0	1	0
64	FW	(India)	Jesin TK	—						4	4	4	4
77	FW	(England)	Jake Jervis	—		5	5	2	2	—		7	7
97	FW	(India)	Subham Bhowmick	—						4	2	4	2

=== Goal scorers ===
As of 17 April 2023

Rank	No.	Pos.	Nat.	Name	Durand Cup	Indian Super League	Super Cup	Calcutta League	Total
1	10	FW	(Brazil)	Cleiton Silva	2	12	0	—	14
2	29	RW	(India)	Naorem Mahesh Singh	0	2	3	—	5
3	6	FW	(India)	Sumeet Passi	2	0	1	—	3
3	11	FW	(India)	V. P. Suhair	0	2	1	—	3
5	14	CM	(Brazil)	Alex Lima	0	1	0	—	1
5	15	CM	(India)	Mobashir Rahman	0	0	1	—	1
5	16	CB	(India)	Sarthak Golui	0	1	0	—	1
5	24	CM	(Australia)	Jordan O'Doherty	0	1	0	—	1
5	26	FW	(India)	Semboi Haokip	0	1	0	0	1
5	40	RB	(Cyprus)	Charalambos Kyriakou	0	1	0	—	1
5	59	LW	(India)	Vivek Singh	—	—	0	1	1
5	64	FW	(India)	Jesin TK	—	—	0	1	1
5	77	FW	(England)	Jake Jervis	—	1	0	—	1
Total					4	22	6	2	34

=== Assists ===
As of 17 April 2023

Rank	No.	Pos.	Nat.	Name	Durand Cup	Indian Super League	Super Cup	Calcutta League	Total
1	29	LW	(India)	Naorem Mahesh Singh	0	7	0	—	7
2	11	FW	(India)	V. P. Suhair	0	3	1	—	4
3	10	FW	(Brazil)	Cleiton Silva	1	1	1	—	3
4	14	CM	(Brazil)	Alex Lima	0	1	1	—	2
4	17	DF	(India)	Jerry Lalrinzuala	1	1	0	—	2
6	15	CM	(India)	Mobashir Rahman	0	1	0	—	1
6	64	FW	(India)	Jesin TK	—	—	—	1	1
Total					2	13	3	1	20

=== Clean sheets ===
As of 17 April 2023

No.	Nat.	Player	Durand Cup	Indian Super League	Super Cup	Calcutta League	Total
1	(India)	Kamaljit Singh	2	3	0	—	5
25	(India)	Suvam Sen	—	0	—	—	0
50	(India)	Suryash Jaiswal	—		—	1	1
65	(India)	Muhammed Nishad	—		—	0	0

=== Disciplinary record ===
As of 17 April 2023

No.	Pos.	Nat.	Name	Durand Cup				Indian Super League				Super Cup				Calcutta League			
No.	Pos.	Nat.	Name	Yellow card	(yellow card) (red card)	(yellow card) (yellow-red card)	Red card	Yellow card	(yellow card) (red card)	(yellow card) (yellow-red card)	Red card	Yellow card	(yellow card) (red card)	(yellow card) (yellow-red card)	Red card	Yellow card	(yellow card) (red card)	(yellow card) (yellow-red card)	Red card
1	GK	(India)	Kamaljit Singh	0	0	0	0	1	0	0	0	0	0	0	0	—	—	—	—
2	RB	(India)	Mohammad Rakip	0	0	0	0	2	0	0	0	0	0	0	0	0	0	0	0
4	CB	(Spain)	Ivan González	2	0	0	0	2	0	0	0	0	0	0	0	—	—	—	—
5	CB	(India)	Lalchungnunga	0	0	0	0	4	0	0	0	0	0	0	0	—	—	—	—
6	FW	(India)	Sumeet Passi	0	0	0	0	4	0	0	0	0	0	0	0	—	—	—	—
8	CM	(India)	Amarjit Singh Kiyam	0	0	0	0	0	0	0	0	0	0	0	0	1	0	0	0
10	FW	(Brazil)	Cleiton Silva	0	0	0	0	4	0	0	0	1	0	0	0	—	—	—	—
11	FW	(India)	V. P. Suhair	0	0	0	0	8	0	0	0	0	0	0	0	—	—	—	—
14	CM	(Brazil)	Alex Lima	1	0	0	0	5	0	0	0	0	0	0	0	—	—	—	—
15	CM	(India)	Mobashir Rahman	1	0	0	0	2	0	1	0	0	0	0	0	0	0	0	0
16	CB	(India)	Sarthak Golui	0	0	0	0	0	0	1	0	1	0	0	0	—	—	—	—
17	LB	(India)	Jerry Lalrinzuala	0	0	0	0	3	0	0	0	0	0	0	0	—	—	—	—
19	RB	(India)	Ankit Mukherjee	1	0	0	0	2	0	0	0	—	—	—	—	1	0	0	0
23	CM	(India)	Souvik Chakrabarti	1	0	0	0	1	0	0	0	0	0	0	0	—	—	—	—
24	CM	(Australia)	Jordan O'Doherty	—	—	—	—	1	0	0	0	0	0	0	0	—	—	—	—
25	GK	(India)	Suvam Sen	—	—	—	—	1	0	0	0	0	0	0	0	—	—	—	—
29	RW	(India)	Naorem Mahesh Singh	0	0	0	0	1	0	0	0	1	0	0	0	—	—	—	—
33	LB	(India)	Pritam Kumar Singh	1	0	0	0	0	0	0	0	—	—	—	—	0	0	0	0
34	RB	(India)	Nabi Hussain Khan	0	0	0	0	0	0	0	0	—	—	—	—	2	0	0	0
37	LB	(India)	Tuhin Das	0	0	0	0	1	0	0	0	0	0	0	0	—	—	—	—
40	CB	(Cyprus)	Charalambos Kyriakou	0	0	0	0	2	0	0	0	0	0	0	0	—	—	—	—
54	FW	(India)	Vishnu TM	—	—	—	—	—	—	—	—	—	—	—	—	1	0	0	0
58	LB	(India)	Niranjan Mondal	—	—	—	—	—	—	—	—	—	—	—	—	1	0	0	0
59	LW	(India)	Vivek Singh	—	—	—	—	—	—	—	—	—	—	—	—	1	0	0	0
65	GK	(India)	Muhammed Nishad P	—	—	—	—	—	—	—	—	—	—	—	—	1	0	0	0
77	FW	(England)	Jake Jervis	—	—	—	—	0	0	0	0	1	0	0	0	—	—	—	—

== Club awards ==
=== ISL Fans' Goal of the Week award ===
This is awarded weekly to the player chosen by fans voting on the Indian Super League website.

Week	Nat.	Player	Score	Result	Opponents	Date	% Votes
Week 3	(Cyprus)	Charalambos Kyriakou	0–2	1–3	NorthEast United	20 October 2022	63.9%
Week 8	(Brazil)	Cleiton Silva	0–2	1–3	Jamshedpur	27 November 2022	31.5%
Week 21	(India)	Naorem Mahesh Singh	0–1	0–1	Mumbai City	19 February 2023	30.9%

=== ISL Emerging Player of the Month award ===
This is awarded to the best young player in the Indian Super League every month.

Month	Nat.	Player	Ref
November	(India)	Naorem Mahesh Singh	

== See also ==
- 2022–23 in Indian football
