= Vishnu TM =

Indian professional footballer

Personal information
- Full name: Vishnu TM
- Date of birth: 27 March 2000 (age 26)
- Place of birth: Shoranur, Kerala, India
- Position: Forward

Team information
- Current team: Tvm Kombans FC

Senior career*
Years	Team	Apps	(Gls)
2020	Aryan FC		
2020−2021	Kerala United FC		
2021-2022	BASCO		
2022-2023	East Bengal FC		
2023	Calcutta Customs Club		
2023-2024	Muthoot FA		
2024-	Tvm Kombans FC		
- * Club domestic league appearances and goals

Vishnu TM (born 27 March 2000) is an Indian professional footballer from Kerala. He plays as a winger for Super League Kerala team Thiruvananthapuram Kombans FC.

He played Calcutta Customs In Calcutta Football League and also played Kerala United, BASCO & Aryan Club
