= José Antonio Pardo =

Spanish footballer

Personal information
- Full name: José Antonio Pardo Lucas
- Date of birth: 21 April 1988 (age 38)
- Place of birth: Valencia, Spain
- Height: 1.88 m (6 ft 2 in)
- Position: Centre back

Team information
- Current team: Extremadura 1924

Youth career
- 2005–2006: Valencia
- 2006–2008: Villarreal

Senior career*
Years	Team	Apps	(Gls)
2007–2008	Villarreal C	26	(0)
2008–2009	Alicante B	15	(0)
2009–2010	Villajoyosa	33	(0)
2010–2012	Valencia B	57	(3)
2012–2013	Recreativo	8	(0)
2013–2014	Oviedo	33	(2)
2014–2015	Hércules	12	(0)
2015–2016	La Hoya Lorca	45	(3)
2016–2017	Mérida	33	(3)
2017–2020	Extremadura	91	(5)
2020–2021	Ibiza	17	(0)
2021–2022	Badajoz	34	(2)
2022–2023	Eldense	22	(0)
2023–2024	East Bengal	10	(0)
2024–	Extremadura 1924	30	(2)
- * Club domestic league appearances and goals as of 1 December 2025

José Antonio Pardo Lucas (born 21 April 1988) is a Spanish professional footballer who plays as a central defender for Extremadura 1924.

== Club career ==
Born in Valencia, Pardo played youth football with local Valencia CF and Villarreal CF, making his senior debuts with the latter's C-team. He played his first seasons in the lower leagues and his native region, representing Alicante CF B, Villajoyosa CF and Valencia CF Mestalla.

In August 2012, Pardo joined Recreativo de Huelva in a two-year deal. He made his second division debut on 18 November, being one of two team players sent off in a 2–5 home loss against CE Sabadell FC.

On 29 July 2013 Pardo signed with Real Oviedo, in the third level. On 17 July of the following year he moved to fellow league team Hércules CF, but halfway through the season he switched again to join La Hoya Lorca CF.

Pardo moved to another team in the same division on 30 June 2016, Mérida AD. A year later, he signed for their neighbours Extremadura UD, where he scored the only goal of the aggregate win over FC Cartagena in the June 2018 playoffs to achieve their first promotion to the second level.

Pardo subsequently resumed his career in the third division, representing UD Ibiza (also helping in a promotion to the second tier), CD Badajoz and CD Eldense (also ending the season with a promotion to the second level).

In June 2024, Pardo returned to Extremadura following a spell with Indian Super League club East Bengal.

== Honours ==
East Bengal

- Super Cup: 2024
