= Tuhin Das =

Indian footballer (born 2000)

Personal information
- Date of birth: 7 March 2000 (age 26)
- Place of birth: West Bengal, India
- Position: Defender

Team information
- Current team: East Bengal Club

Senior career*
| Years | Team | Apps | (Gls) |
| 2022– | East Bengal | | |

International career
- West Bengal football team
- * Club domestic league appearances and goals

Tuhin Das (born 7 March 2000) is a footballer from West Bengal, India. He plays as a defender for the East Bengal Club after getting into a pre-contract agreement for the 2022 football season. He has also represented the West Bengal state football team. He was part of the West Bengal Football Team in the Santosh Trophy 2021-22 campaign where they ended up runners-up after losing to Kerala in the Final. He scored the lone goal in the 1–0 win for the Bengal Santosh Trophy runner's up team friendly against ATK Mohun Bagan as part of the latter's preparation for the AFC Cup.
