= 2017–18 Bengaluru FC season =

2017–18 season of Bengaluru FC

Bengaluru FC
2017–18 season
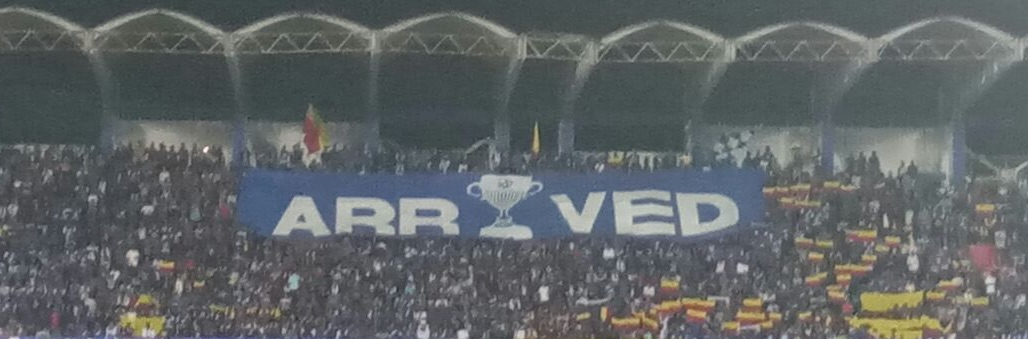
- West Block Blues celebrating club's participation in Indian Super League.
- Chairman: Parth Jindal
- Manager: Albert Roca
- Stadium: Sree Kanteerava Stadium
- Indian Super League: Runner-up
- AFC Cup: 2017: Inter-zone play-off finals (Note: Bengaluru FC advanced to the inter-zone play-off semi-finals during 2016–17 season.); 2018: Inter-zone play-off semi-finals (Note: Bengaluru FC advanced to the inter-zone play-off semi-finals, played during 2018–19 season)
- Super Cup: Winners
- Top goalscorer: League: Miku (15 goals); All: Sunil Chhetri (24 goals)
- Highest home attendance: 25,373 vs Kerala Blasters (1 March 2018)
- Lowest home attendance: 1,051 vs Dhaka Abahani (14 March 2018)
- Average home league attendance: 19,053
Home colours	Away colours	Third colours

The 2017–18 season was Bengaluru FC's fifth season as club since its establishment in 2013. This was club's first season in Indian Super League.

== Background ==
In 2016–17 season Bengaluru FC got mixed results. Club failed to defend their league title, finished fourth in the I-League. The club did well in the Federation Cup, won their second cup title in four years by defeating Mohun Bagan 2–0 in final. Bengaluru FC finished the season well by advancing to AFC cup knock–out stage by beating Maziya S&RC in a must win game and keeping hope alive to better their previous seasons record in AFC Cup where Bengaluru FC finished runners–up.

On 11 May 2017, it was announced by the Indian Super League organizers, Football Sports Development, that they would be inviting bids for new teams to join the league for the upcoming season. Bengaluru FC had submitted a bid from Bengaluru. On 12 June, it was officially announced that Bengaluru FC (for Bengaluru) and Tata Group (for Jamshedpur) had won the bids for the new teams.

=== Transfers ===
Due to the Indian Super League regulation each club is allowed to retain a maximum of two Indian players over the age of twenty-one (21). On 30 June, Bengaluru FC announced they are retaining the captain Sunil Chhetri and Udanta Singh. Bengaluru FC also retained defenders John Johnson and Juanan. Goalkeeper Amrinder Singh parted ways with the club. He was retained by Mumbai City. Bengaluru FC announced signing of Australian midfielder Erik Paartalu on 5 July. Winger C.K. Vineeth switched the side. He joined Kerala Blasters. On 11 July Bengaluru FC announced signing of Spanish midfielder Dimas Delgado who last played for A-League side Western Sydney Wanderers. On 17 July Spanish winger Antonio Dovale was signed for a season. On 21 July, the club announced retention of under-22 players, defender Nishu Kumar, midfielder Malsawmzuala and striker Daniel Lalhlimpuia for a season.

In ISL draft held on 23 July 2017, Bengaluru FC retained goalkeepers Lalthuammawia Ralte and Calvin Abhishek, midfielders Lenny Rodrigues, Alwyn George and Harmanjot Khabra. Bengaluru FC added eight new players from draft, goalkeeper Abhra Mondal, defenders Joyner Lourenco, Rahul Bheke, Subhasish Bose, Zohmingliana Ralte and Collin Abranches, midfielder Boithang Haokip and striker Thongkhosiem Haokip.

Eight players from Bengaluru FC were signed by other clubs in the draft. Goalkeeper Arindam Bhattacharya signed by Mumbai City. Defender Keegan Pereira, midfielders Eugeneson Lyngdoh and Shankar Sampingiraj were signed by Atlético de Kolkata. Defenders Rino Anto and Lalchhuan Mawia were signed by Kerala Blasters and Pune City respectively. Striker Seminlen Doungel and defender Gursimrat Singh were signed by NorthEast United.

Bengaluru FC announced signing of midfielders Bidyananda Singh and Robinson Singh for two years on 31 July. On 7 August the club announced signing of Spanish forward Braulio Nóbrega for a season. Bengaluru fc added their academy graduates defender Prashanth Kalinga and forward Leon Augustine to the squad for 2017 AFC Cup knockout rounds. On 17 August Bengaluru FC announced signing of India national football team goalkeeper Gurpreet Singh Sandhu from Norwegian side Stabæk FC for an undisclosed transfer amount.

On 29 August Bengaluru FC announced signing of Venezuelan international striker Miku for two years. The club announced signing of Spanish winger Edu García for one year on 3 September.

During winter transfer window, Bengaluru FC released injured striker Braulio Nóbrega and signed another Spaniard Daniel Segovia on 15 February 2018, in a short-term deal till the end of the season. Bengaluru also agreed to the transfer for Edu García to China League One side Zhejiang Greentown for an estimated transfer fee for $150,000. In the process, Bengaluru FC became the first club receive a transfer fee from a foreign club. Bengaluru signed Spanish midfielder Víctor Pérez Alonso as a replacement on a short team deal for the rest of the season.

==== In ====
No.	Position	Player	Previous club	Transfer fee	Date	Ref
46	MF	(Australia) Erik Paartalu	(Qatar) Al Kharaitiyat	Free agent	5 July 2017	
9	MF	(Spain) Dimas Delgado	(Australia) Western Sydney Wanderers	Free agent	11 July 2017	
49	MF	(Spain) Antonio Dovale	(Spain) Rayo Vallecano	Free agent	17 July 2017	
2	DF	(India) Rahul Bheke	East Bengal	N/A	23 July 2017	
27	DF	(India) Subhasish Bose	Mohun Bagan	N/A	23 July 2017	
35	DF	(India) Zohmingliana Ralte	Aizawl	N/A	23 July 2017	
48	FW	(India) Thongkhosiem Haokip	East Bengal	N/A	23 July 2017	
1	GK	(India) Abhra Mondal	Chennai City	N/A	23 July 2017	
12	MF	(India) Boithang Haokip	Mumbai City	N/A	23 July 2017	
3	DF	(India) Collin Abranches	Ozone	N/A	23 July 2017	
29	DF	(India) Joyner Lourenco	Sporting Clube de Goa	N/A	23 July 2017	
—	MF	(India) Bidyananda Singh	Atlético de Kolkata	N/A	31 July 2017	
38	MF	(India) Robinson Singh	Mohun Bagan	N/A	31 July 2017	
9	FW	(Spain) Braulio Nóbrega	(Cyprus) Doxa	Free agent	7 August 2017	
39	FW	(India) Leon Augustine	Bengaluru FC Academy	N/A	16 August 2017	
27	DF	(India) Prashanth Kalinga	Bengaluru FC Academy	N/A	16 August 2017	
45	GK	(India) Gurpreet Singh Sandhu	(Norway) Stabæk	undisclosed	17 August 2017	
7	FW	(Venezuela) Miku	(Spain) Rayo Vallecano	Free agent	29 August 2017	
13	MF	(Spain) Edu García	(Spain) Real Zaragoza	Free agent	3 September 2017	
12	FW	(Spain) Daniel Lucas Segovia	(Azerbaijan) Neftçi PFK	Free agent	15 February 2018	
44	MF	(Spain) Víctor Pérez Alonso	(Poland) Wisła Kraków	Free agent	2 March 2018	

==== Out ====
No.	Position	Player	New club	Transfer fee	Date	Ref
1	GK	(India) Amrinder Singh	Mumbai City	N/A	1 July 2017	
26	MF	(Australia) Cameron Watson	(Indonesia) Madura United	N/A	12 July 2017	
31	FW	(India) C.K. Vineeth	Kerala Blasters	N/A	5 July 2017	
14	MF	(India) Eugeneson Lyngdoh	Atlético de Kolkata	N/A	23 July 2017	
13	DF	(India) Rino Anto	Kerala Blasters	N/A	23 July 2017	
23	DF	(India) Lalchhuan Mawia	Pune City	N/A	23 July 2017	
27	GK	(India) Arindam Bhattacharya	Mumbai City	N/A	23 July 2017	
5	DF	(India) Keegan Pereira	Atlético de Kolkata	N/A	23 July 2017	
16	MF	(India) Shankar Sampingiraj	Atlético de Kolkata	N/A	23 July 2017	
7	FW	(India) Seminlen Doungel	NorthEast United	N/A	23 July 2017	
33	DF	(India) Gursimrat Singh	NorthEast United	N/A	23 July 2017	
9	FW	(Spain) Braulio Nóbrega		Released	15 February 2018	
13	MF	(Spain) Edu García	(China) Zhejiang Greentown	$150,000	23 February 2018	

== Pre-season and friendlies ==
Bengaluru FC, having completed the squad selection at 2017–18 ISL Players Draft, arranged a 10-day pre-season training camp in Murcia, Spain before facing North Korean side April 25 Sports Club. During the tour, the blues were scheduled to face Segunda División B side UCAM Murcia CF and UAE Pro League side Baniyas Club in the friendlies. Later, a friendly against FC Cartagena was added as well. Bengaluru FC lost all three friendlies. During the AFC cup campaign, Bengaluru FC played India national under-19 football team and won with a solitary goal from Daniel Lalhlimpuia.

After the conclusion of 2017 AFC Cup and before 2017–18 Indian Super League, Bengaluru FC played two games against the former I-League rivals East Bengal F.C., behind closed doors. The first game on 25 October 2017 ended in a draw with Surabuddin Mollick and Miku scoring a goal each for their respective teams. Bengaluru FC won the second friendly 3–1. Udanta Singh scored a brace, whereas Miku scored the third goal. Bengaluru FC then played two friendlies against I-League debutant, Gokulam FC, winning both games 2–0 and 3–1, respectively. Before the international break, Bengaluru FC played two more friendlies with Chennai City F.C., drawing the first 2–2, and winning the second friendly 6–1. In the final friendly before ISL, Bengaluru FC played yet another I-League side Minerva Punjab F.C., and lost the game 2–3.

9 August 2017 Friendly	UCAM Murcia CF	4–2	Bengaluru FC	Murcia, Spain
19:00 CET	Chevi 33'; Isi Ros 49'; Arroyo 55'; Victor Garcia 85'	Report	Chhetri 8', 56'	Stadium: Pinatar Arena

12 August 2017 Friendly	FC Cartagena	3–0	Bengaluru FC	Murcia, Spain
19:00 CET	Kuki Zalazar 44'; Aketxe 52', 55'	Report		Stadium: La Manga Stadium

15 August 2017 Friendly	Baniyas Club	3–0	Bengaluru FC	Murcia, Spain
19:00 CET	Novillo 17'; Hamad 38'; Mubarak Al–Mansoori 76'	Report		Stadium: Pinatar Arena

1 September 2017 Friendly	Bengaluru FC	1–0	India U-19	Bengaluru
15:00 IST	Lalhlimpuia	Report		Stadium: Bangalore Football Stadium

25 October 2017 Friendly	Bengaluru FC	1–1	East Bengal	Bengaluru
10:00 IST	Miku 80'	Report	Mollick 9'	Stadium: Sree Kanteerava Stadium; Attendance: 0

27 October 2017 Friendly	Bengaluru FC	3–1	East Bengal	Bengaluru
10:00 IST	Udanta; Miku	Report	Plaza	Stadium: Sree Kanteerava Stadium; Attendance: 0

31 October 2017 Friendly	Bengaluru FC	2–0	Gokulam FC	Bellary
10:00 IST	Alwyn; Miku	Report		Stadium: Bengaluru FC residential academy ground

2 November 2017 Friendly	Bengaluru FC	3–1	Gokulam FC	Bellary
10:00 IST	Chhetri; Dimas; Lalhlimpuia	Report		Stadium: Bengaluru FC residential academy ground

4 November 2017 Friendly	Bengaluru FC	2–2	Chennai City	Bellary
10:00 IST	Lalhlimpuia; Chhetri (pen.)	Report	G. Singh; Shumeyko	Stadium: Bengaluru FC residential academy ground

5 November 2017 Friendly	Bengaluru FC	6–1	Chennai City	Bellary
10:00 IST	Udanta; Chhetri; Nóbrega; Paartalu; T. Haokip	Report	Amirov	Stadium: Bengaluru FC residential academy ground

8 November 2017 Friendly	Bengaluru FC	2–3	Minerva Punjab	Bellary
10:00 IST	Miku 43', 63'	Report	Chencho 9', 32', 71'	Stadium: Bengaluru FC residential academy ground

== Competitions ==
=== Overview ===
Competition	First match	Last match	Starting round	Final position	Record							
Competition	First match	Last match	Starting round	Final position	Pld	W	D	L	GF	GA	GD	Win %
2017 AFC Cup	23 August 2017	18 October 2017	Quarter-final	Semi-inal	4	1	2	1	5	3	+2	25.00
2017–18 Indian Super League	19 November 2017	17 March 2018	Matchday-1	Runners-up	21	14	2	5	40	20	+20	66.67
2018 AFC Cup	23 January 2018	16 May 2018	Preliminary round	Qualified	10	8	1	1	25	5	+20	80.00
Super Cup	1 April 2018	20 April 2018	Round-of-16	Champions	4	4	0	0	13	5	+8	100.00
Total					39	27	5	7	83	33	+50	69.23

Last updated: 31 May 2018
Source: Competitions

=== Indian Super League ===
==== Summary ====
===== November =====
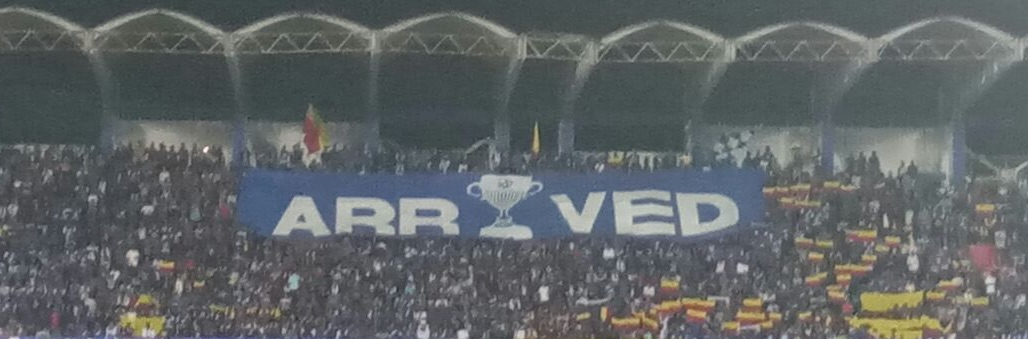
West Block Blues celebrating Bengaluru FC's participation in Indian Super League.

Bengaluru made their ISL debut against Mumbai City on 19 November 2017 at the Sree Kanteerava Stadium in Bengaluru. Roca handed starts to new foreign signings, Edu García and Miku. Despite wonderful link up play between the forward duo of Chhetri and Miku, the hosts lacked finishing in the final third in the first half. There was hardly any opportunities created by Mumbai themselves as they chose to sit deep and Bengaluru dominated the game. In the second half, Bengaluru scored their first goal in ISL, courtesy a short corner routine, when Edu Garcia drilled one past former BFC man Amrinder Singh at the near post at the 67th minute. A defensive mix up in added time meant that Chhetri could get his name on the scoresheet and sealed a 2–0 victory for the blues. Bengaluru continued the form against Delhi Dynamos, whom they defeated 4–1 with Erik Paartalu scoring a brace and Miku scoring his first goal for the club. However, they conceded a penalty late in the second half when John Johnson was adjudged to have a handball inside the penalty area. Bengaluru played their first away game of the season against FC Goa on 30 November 2017. In the action packed first half, Gurpreet Singh Sandhu was sent off and Bengaluru conceded three goals. With the team down to 10-men, Bengaluru managed to equalize score with Miku's brace at 3–3, but once Goa took the lead with Coro's hat-trick in 63rd minute, Bengaluru could not find an equalizer and tasted the first defeat of the season.

===== December =====
Bengaluru FC kicked off the month of December with an away game against NorthEast United on 8 December. Bengaluru FC made multiple changes, including bringing in Lalthuammawia Ralte to replace Gurpreet Singh Sandhu, who was suspended for 2 games. Miku scored the only goal of the match to ensure the first away win of the season for Bengaluru FC. Bengaluru played third consecutive away game against FC Pune City on 14 December. Facing the crowded schedule ahead, Bengaluru FC chose to start without John Johnson and Edu García. After lack of clear chances initially, Pune City took the lead from Adil Khan's header. However, after Pune City's Baljit Sahni was sent-off after second yellow card, Bengaluru FC made the best of the situation and scored 3 goals in the second half with Miku scoring a brace and Sunil Chhetri scoring the final goal of the game in stoppage time. Bengaluru FC returned home against Chennaiyin on 17 December 2017. Chennaiyin's stubborn defence contained Bengaluru FC attack and inflicted 1–2 defeat on the home team, with Sunil Chhetri scoring the only goal for Bengaluru. Playing against the fellow debutant Jamshedpur FC, Bengaluru conceded the late penalty to lose the game 0–1. In a highly anticipated match, Bengaluru FC faced Kerala Blasters on the New Year's Eve. The first half remained goalless in the first half, but Bengaluru FC took the lead with Sunil Chhetri's penalty in the second half. The stoppage time saw a flurry of goals, including a brace from Miku and Bengaluru won the game 1–3.

===== January =====
Bengaluru played the first game of 2018 at home against ATK on 7 January 2017 and won it 1–0 courtesy a goal from Sunil Chhetri in first half. With upcoming fixtures of 2018 AFC Cup, Bengaluru FC rotated the squad against bottom-placed Delhi Dynamos FC. However, the rotation did not work out as Bengaluru faced 2–0 defeat away from home. Still on the road, Bengaluru faced Mumbai City FC on 18 January 2018. Sunil Chhetri scored a brace against his former team and with a goal from Miku, Bengaluru registered a comfortable 3–1 win and climbed back to the top of the table. Bengaluru secured another win at home against the highlanders, NorthEast United FC in the final game of January. Juanan and Sunil Chhetri scored a goal in each half to secure 3 points for the home team.

===== February =====
Once again Bengaluru FC started month playing ATK, this time an away match. Bengaluru won the match 0–2. Jordi Figueras Montel scored an own goal to give Bengaluru lead in 3rd minute. At 69th minute Bengaluru reduced ten men, when Rahul Bheke received second yellow of the match and sent off. Miku scored second goal of the match at 83rd minute to keep Bengaluru FC top of the table. In top of the table clash, Bengaluru FC next played Chennaiyin FC away 6 February. Boithang Haokip gave the team an early lead, while Miku and Sunil Chhetri scored the goals in the second half to earn a decisive 3–1 victory in the South India derby and a lead of 7 points at the top. Bengaluru continued the winning run against FC Goa at home on 9 February 2018. Edu García secured the lead in the first half while Dimas Delgado scored his first goal for the team and sealed the game 2–0 in the second half, extending the team's winning streak to five games. With the win, Bengaluru FC also became the first team to confirm their spot in the semi-finals. In another top of the table clash, Bengaluru FC faced FC Pune City at home on 16 February 2018. After conceding a goal in the first half, Bengaluru equalized with Miku's goal in the second half. Bengaluru were denied a clear penalty opportunity in the dying minutes of the game and settled for their first draw of the season in Indian Super League. In the last away game of the season, Bengaluru FC faced Jamshedpur FC on 25 February 2018. Miku and Sunil Chhetri secured lead in the first half with a goal each and Gurpreet Singh Sandhu made crucial saves in the second half to earn a clean sheet and secured 2–0 win. With the win, Bengaluru FC also secured the top spot for the league stage.

===== March =====

Lineup against Chennaiyin FC in 2018 Indian Super League final

In the final game of the league stage, Bengaluru faced southern rivals Kerala Blasters at the home on 1 March 2018. The game remained deadlocked until Miku and Udanta Singh scored two goals in injury time to finish the league stage with a win.

Bengaluru FC faced 4th placed FC Pune City in the semi-finals. Playing the first leg at away, Bengaluru had to settle for a goal-less draw. In the return leg played at home, Bengaluru FC defeated Pune City 3–1 to enter final in their debut ISL season. Captain Sunil Chhetri scored his first hat-trick for Bengaluru FC. Jonatan Lucca scored the lone goal for Pune City.

Bengaluru FC faced Chennaiyin FC in the final, played at Bengaluru FC's home Sree Kanteerava Stadium. Owing to Subhasish Bose's suspension, Bengaluru opted to play three at the back with John Johnson, Erik Paartalu and Juanan playing in the defence and Rahul Bheke and Boithang Haokip playing as wing backs. Bengaluru took an early lead with Sunil Chhetri scoring a header from Udanta Singh's assist in 9th minute. However, Chennaiyin quickly equalized via Maílson Alves's header in 17th minute from a corner. Bengaluru FC suffered a double blow as Dimas Delgado had to be substituted just before the half time due to an injury and Maílson Alves scored the second goal just before the half time. Chennaiyin strengthened their lead as Raphael Augusto scored the third goal on the counter. Bengaluru FC's relentless attack in the dying minutes earned them a second goal by Miku, but Chennaiyin held on to the lead and emerged winner. The loss also ended Bengaluru FC's 15 match unbeaten streak across all tournaments and their first loss since their loss against Delhi Dynamos FC in January 2018.

Reacting to the defeat, Albert Roca said:

To concede from set-pieces is always disappointing. I don’t blame the defence for this. It is my responsibility to change the system. But, I accept I made a mistake in the formation. Sometimes in football it is not the players who make the mistakes, but the coaches. And perhaps this time I made a mistake. I don’t think we felt pressure, but Mailson scoring from two corners made a big difference. In a few minutes, the game changed. In football, you need players with his kind of experience to rise to the situation.

==== League stage ====
19 November 2017 1	Bengaluru FC	2–0	Mumbai City	Bengaluru
20:00 IST	Edu 67'; Chhetri (yellow card) 83' (goal) 90+3'	Report	Gerson (yellow card) 15'	Stadium: Sree Kanteerava Stadium; Attendance: 17,796; Referee: Aurélien Juenkou; Man of the Match: Sunil Chhetri (Bengaluru FC)

26 November 2017 2	Bengaluru FC	4–1	Delhi Dynamos	Bengaluru
20:00 IST	Paartalu 24', 45+3'; Lenny 57'; Miku 87'		Kalu 86' (pen.)	Stadium: Sree Kanteerava Stadium; Attendance: 18,248; Referee: R Venkatesh; Man of the Match: Erik Paartalu (Bengaluru FC)

30 November 2017 3	Goa	4–3	Bengaluru FC	Margao
20:00 IST	Coro 16', 33', 63'; Lanzarote 40' (pen.)	Report	Rodrigues (yellow card) 7'; Miku 21', 60'; Bheke (yellow card) 24'; Sandhu (red card) 36'; Paartalu 57'; Mondal (yellow card) 90'	Stadium: Fatorda Stadium; Attendance: 18,600; Referee: Palmson Raj Moses; Man of the Match: Coro (FC Goa)

8 December 2017 4	NorthEast United	0–1	Bengaluru FC	Guwahati
20:00 IST	Nirmal (yellow card) 31'; Reagan (yellow card) 53'; Adilson (yellow card) 57'; Páez (yellow card) 90'	Report	Johnson (yellow card) 25'; Khabra (yellow card) 38'; Miku 47'	Stadium: Indira Gandhi Athletic Stadium; Attendance: 16,972; Referee: Pranjal Banerjee; Man of the Match: Miku (Bengaluru FC)

14 December 2017 5	Pune City	1–3	Bengaluru FC	Pune
20:00 IST	Khan 35'; Sahni (yellow card) 45+2' (red card) 67'	Report	Chhetri (yellow card) 28' (goal) 90+6'; Miku 64', 78'	Stadium: Shree Shiv Chhatrapati Sports Complex; Attendance: 9,968; Referee: Raul Gupta; Man of the Match: Miku (Bengaluru FC)

17 December 2017 6	Bengaluru FC	1–2	Chennaiyin	Bengaluru
17:30 IST	Khabra (yellow card) 12'; Chhetri 85'	Report	Jeje 5'; Dhanpal (yellow card) 82' (goal) 88'	Stadium: Sree Kanteerava Stadium; Attendance: 21,924; Referee: Raktim Shah; Man of the Match: Mailson Alves (Chennaiyin)

21 December 2017 7	Bengaluru FC	0–1	Jamshedpur	Bengaluru
20:00 IST	Paartalu (yellow card) 67'; Bheke (yellow card) 90+1'	Report	Choudhary (yellow card) 88'; Gonçalves 90+1'	Stadium: Sree Kanteerava Stadium; Attendance: 12,564; Referee: C.R. Srikrishna; Man of the Match: Miku (Bengaluru FC)

31 December 2017 8	Kerala Blasters	1–3	Bengaluru FC	Kochi
17:30 IST	Shadap (yellow card) 20'; Jhingan (yellow card) 60'; Lakić-Pešić (yellow card) 75'; Pekuson 90+5'	Report	Juanan (yellow card) 18'; Bose (yellow card) 47'; Chhetri 60'; Khabra (yellow card) 81'; Miku 90+2', 90+4'	Stadium: Jawaharlal Nehru Stadium; Attendance: 37,986; Referee: R Venkatesh; Man of the Match: Sunil Chhetri (Bengaluru FC)

7 January 2018 9	Bengaluru FC	1–0	ATK	Bengaluru
20:00 IST	Chhetri 40'; Miku (yellow card) 73'	Report		Stadium: Sree Kanteerava Stadium; Attendance: 17,942; Referee: Tejas Nagvenkar; Man of the Match: Juanan (Bengaluru FC)

14 January 2018 10	Delhi Dynamos	2–0	Bengaluru FC	New Delhi
17:30 IST	Chhangte (yellow card) 32' (goal) 72'; Guyon 90+7' (pen.)	Report	Bose (red card) 90+6'	Stadium: Jawaharlal Nehru Stadium; Attendance: 5,124; Man of the Match: Lallianzuala Chhangte (Delhi Dynamos)

18 January 2018 11	Mumbai City	1–3	Bengaluru FC	Mumbai
20:00 IST	Balwant (yellow card) 38'; Amrinder (yellow card) 42'; Davinder (yellow card) 45'; Costa 76'	Report	Paartalu (yellow card) 40'; Chhetri 43' (pen.), 52'; Miku 63'	Stadium: Mumbai Football Arena; Attendance: 6,059; Referee: Santosh Kumar; Man of the Match: Sunil Chhetri (Bengaluru FC)

26 January 2018 12	Bengaluru FC	2–1	NorthEast United	Bengaluru
20:00 IST	Juanan 14'; Chhetri 51'; Sandhu (yellow card) 70'; Khabra (yellow card) 78'	Report	Chhetri (yellow card) 41'; Marcinho 45+2' (pen.); Sambinha (yellow card) 70'	Stadium: Sree Kanteerava Stadium; Attendance: 15,272; Referee: Om Prakash Thakur; Man of the Match: Juanan (Bengaluru FC)

3 February 2018 13	ATK	0–2	Bengaluru FC	Kolkata
20:00 IST		Report	Jordi 3' (o.g.); Bheke (yellow card) 63' (yellow-red card) 69'; Juanan (yellow card) 67'; Miku 83'	Stadium: Salt Lake Stadium; Attendance: 5,295; Referee: Tejas Nagvenkar; Man of the Match: Gurpreet Singh Sandhu (Bengaluru FC)

6 February 2018 14	Chennaiyin	1–3	Bengaluru FC	Chennai
20:00 IST	Sereno (yellow card) 10' (yellow-red card) 71'; Francis 33'; Ganesh (yellow card) 43'	Report	B. Haokip 3' (yellow card) 55'; Johnson (yellow card) 51'; Dimas (yellow card) 53'; Miku 63'; Chhetri 90+3'	Stadium: Jawaharlal Nehru Stadium; Attendance: 12,499; Referee: Pranjal Banerjee; Man of the Match: Dimas Delgado (Bengaluru FC)

9 February 2018 15	Bengaluru FC	2–0	Goa	Bengaluru
20:00 IST	Edu 35'; Dimas (yellow card) 59' (goal) 82'	Report	Narayan (yellow card) 66'	Stadium: Sree Kanteerava Stadium; Attendance: 14,724; Referee: Ranjit Bakshi; Man of the Match: Dimas Delgado (Bengaluru FC)

16 February 2018 16	Bengaluru FC	1–1	Pune City	Bengaluru
20:00 IST	Johnson (yellow card) 61'; Miku (yellow card) 69' (goal) 75'; Juanan (yellow card) 85'	Report	Golui 22'; Marcelinho (yellow card) 34'; Alfaro (yellow card) 36'; Panwar (yellow card) 79'	Stadium: Sree Kanteerava Stadium; Attendance: 15,773; Referee: R Venkatesh; Man of the Match: Miku (Bengaluru FC)

25 February 2018 17	Jamshedpur	0–2	Bengaluru FC	Bhubaneswar
20:00 IST	Pal (yellow card) 21'; Priori (yellow card) 23'; Hossain (yellow card) 72' (yellow-red card) 90'; Azuka (yellow card) 77'	Report	Miku 23' (pen.); Chhetri 34'; Juanan (yellow card) 75'; Johnson (yellow card) 86'	Stadium: Kalinga Stadium; Attendance: 8,178; Referee: Matt Conger; Man of the Match: Gurpreet Singh Sandhu (Bengaluru FC)

1 March 2018 18	Bengaluru FC	2–0	Kerala Blasters	Bengaluru
20:00 IST	B.Haokip (yellow card) 19'; Miku 90+1'; Udanta 90+3'	Report		Stadium: Sree Kanteerava Stadium; Attendance: 25,373; Referee: Pranjal Banerjee; Man of the Match: Miku (Bengaluru FC)

==== Playoffs ====
7 March 2018 Semi-Finals	Pune City	0–0	Bengaluru FC	Pune
20:00 IST	G. Singh (yellow card) 30'; Stanković (yellow card) 87'	Report	Dimas (yellow card) 27'; Subashish (yellow card) 71'	Stadium: Shree Shiv Chhatrapati Sports Complex; Attendance: 9,284; Referee: Om Prakash Thakur; Man of the Match: Marko Stanković (Pune City)

11 March 2018 Semi-Finals	Bengaluru FC	3–1	Pune City	Bengaluru
20:00 IST	Chhetri 15', 65' (pen.), 89'; Subashish (yellow card) 44'	Report	Panwar (yellow card) 31'; Carlos (yellow card) 34'; Rafa (yellow card) 37'; Lucca 82'	Stadium: Sree Kanteerava Stadium; Attendance: 24,214; Referee: Turki Al-Khudair; Man of the Match: Sunil Chhetri (Bengaluru FC)

Final

17 March 2018 Final	Bengaluru FC	2–3	Chennaiyin	Bengaluru
20:00 IST	Chhetri 7' (yellow card) 85'; Rodrigues (yellow card) 78'; Miku 90'	Report	Alves 17', 45'; Nelson (yellow card) 22'; Augusto 67'	Stadium: Sree Kanteerava Stadium; Attendance: 25,753; Referee: Ali Abdulnabi; Man of the Match: Maílson Alves (Chennaiyin FC)

==== Table ====
Pos	Team	Pld	W	D	L	GF	GA	GD	Pts	Qualification or relegation
1	Bengaluru	18	13	1	4	35	16	+19	40	Qualification for ISL play-offs
2	Chennaiyin (Note: Qualified for 2019 AFC Cup qualifying play-offs) (C)	18	9	5	4	24	19	+5	32	Qualification for ISL play-offs
3	Goa	18	9	3	6	42	28	+14	30	Qualification for ISL play-offs
4	Pune City	18	9	3	6	30	21	+9	30	Qualification for ISL play-offs
5	Jamshedpur	18	7	5	6	16	18	−2	26	

Source: Indian Super League
Rules for classification: 1) points; 2) head-to-head points; 3) head-to-head goal difference; 4) head-to-head goals scored; 5) goal difference; 5) number of goals scored; 6) fair play ranking; 6) drawing of lots
(C) Champions

==== Results by matchday ====
Matchday	1	2	3	4	5	6	7	8	9	10	11	12	13	14	15	16	17	18
Ground	H	H	A	A	A	H	H	A	H	A	A	H	A	A	H	H	A	H
Result	W	W	L	W	W	L	L	W	W	L	W	W	W	W	W	D	W	W
Position	1	1	1	1	1	2	2	3	1	2	1	1	1	1	1	1	1	1

Updated to match(es) played on 1 March 2018. Source: soccerway
A = Away; H = Home; W = Win; D = Draw; L = Loss

=== 2017 AFC Cup ===
Inter-zone play-off semi-finals

Bengaluru FC advanced to the inter-zone play-off semi-finals during 2016–17 season. The draw for the Inter-zone play-off semi-finals was held on 6 June 2017. Bengaluru FC was pitted against east Asian zone champions North Korean club April 25. Bengaluru FC kicked off its 2017–18 season with the home game. Bengaluru FC took the lead against North Korean champions in 33rd minute with Sunil Chhetri's penalty. Bengaluru scored two more goals in the second half and took 3–0 lead in the first leg. In the second leg, Bengaluru FC managed to hold April 25 to a goalless draw. The home team was awarded a penalty in 75th minute, however Gurpreet Singh Sandhu guessed it correctly to keep a clean sheet for Bengaluru FC and the team advanced to Inter-zone play-off finals with 3–0 aggregate.

23 August 2017	Bengaluru FC (India)	3–0	(North Korea) April 25	Bengaluru, India
19:00 UTC+5:30	Rodrigues (yellow card) 22' (goal) 77'; Dimas (yellow card) 28'; Chhetri 33' (pen.); Khabra (yellow card) 43'; Udanta 51'	Report	Ri Kang (yellow card) 32'; O Hyok-chol (yellow card) 53'	Stadium: Sree Kanteerava Stadium; Attendance: 4,709; Referee: Turki Al-Khudhayr (Saudi Arabia); MVP: Sunil Chhetri (Bengaluru FC)

13 September 2017	April 25 (North Korea)	0–0 (0–3 agg.)	(India) Bengaluru FC	Pyongyang, North Korea
17:00 UTC+8:30		Report	Nishu (yellow card) 32'; Toni (yellow card) 90+2'	Stadium: Rungrado 1st of May Stadium; Attendance: 6,500; Referee: Wang Di (China); MVP: Gurpreet Singh Sandhu (Bengaluru FC)

Inter-zone play-off finals

Bengaluru faced Tajik League champions FC Istiklol in the inter-zone play-off finals. In the first leg, Tajik champions got the better of the visitors and secured 1–0 lead with a goal from Dmitry Barkov in the first half. Bengaluru FC's vocal appeals for a penalty in the injury time were denied by the referee and Bengaluru had to be content without an away goal. In the home leg, Bengaluru FC gave away an early goal by conceding a penalty and an important away goal to Tajik team. Bengaluru came back twice from behind but could not overcome the deficit and the game ended at 2–2, ending their campaign in 2017 AFC Cup.

27 September 2017	Istiklol (Tajikistan)	1–0	(India) Bengaluru FC	Hisor, Tajikistan
19:00 UTC+5	Barkov 27'; Davronov (yellow card) 73'	Report		Stadium: Hisor Central Stadium; Attendance: 11,000; Referee: Valentin Kovalenko (Uzbekistan); MVP: Fatkhullo Fatkhuloev (FC Istiklol)

18 October 2017	Bengaluru FC (India)	2–2 (2–3 agg.)	(Tajikistan) Istiklol	Bengaluru, India
19:00 UTC+5:30	Sandhu (yellow card) 3'; Bheke 24'; Khabra (yellow card) 25' (yellow-red card) 42'; Juanan (yellow card) 57'; Chhetri 65' (pen.)	Report	Davronov 4' (pen.); Barkov 56'	Stadium: Sree Kanteerava Stadium; Attendance: 7,862; Referee: Khamis Al-Marri (Qatar); MVP: Sunil Chhetri (Bengaluru FC)

=== 2018 AFC Cup ===
==== Qualifying play-offs ====
As the winner of 2016–17 Indian Federation Cup, Bengaluru FC qualified for AFC cup for fourth consecutive time. They faced the 2017 Bhutan National League champions Transport United in the preliminary round. Facing crowded schedule in continental games and domestic league, Bengaluru FC fielded an inexperienced squad in the away leg. Bengaluru FC Academy graduate Prashanth Kalinga made his debut for the senior team. Bengaluru could not capitalize on the chances created and had to settle for a 0–0 draw. However, Bengaluru scored a convincing victory in the home leg, with Boithang Haokip, Daniel Lalhlimpuia, and Thongkhosiem Haokip scoring a goal each.

In the play-off round, Bengaluru FC faced 2017 Dhivehi Premier League runners-up, T.C. Sports Club. Bengaluru traveled to Malé for the first leg with ongoing political crisis in Maldives. The first half remained goalless, but Bengaluru scored two quick goals in the second half to take 0–2 lead with goals from Thongkhosiem Haokip and Erik Paartalu, however defensive lapses allowed TC Sports to score two goals and equalize. However, Thongkhosiem Haokip scored again in 78th minute to snatch 2–3 victories for the visitors. In the home leg, Bengaluru FC secured a dominant 5–0 victory against the visitors as Toni Dovale scored Bengaluru's first ever hat-trick in an Asian tournament, while Erik Paartalu and Rahul Bheke scored other goals.

Preliminary round

23 January 2018	Transport United (Bhutan)	0–0	(India) Bengaluru FC	Thimphu, Bhutan
17:30 IST		Report		Stadium: Changlimithang Stadium; Attendance: 3,100; Referee: Sivakorn Pu-udom (Thailand); MVP: Toni Dovale (Bengaluru FC)

30 January 2018	Bengaluru FC (India)	3–0 (3–0 agg.)	(Bhutan) Transport United	Bengaluru, India
20:00 IST	T. Haokip (yellow card) 26' (goal) 62'; B. Haokip 27'; Daniel 54'	Report	Sangay Dorji (yellow card) 75'	Stadium: Sree Kanteerava Stadium; Attendance: 1,167; Referee: Mooud Bonyadifar (Iran)

Play-off round

13 February 2018	TC Sports (Maldives)	2–3	(India) Bengaluru FC	Malé, Maldives
21:30 IST	Rilwan (yellow card) 43'; Anatoliy 71'; Mahudhee 73'	Report	B. Haokip (yellow card) 43'; T. Haokip 52', 78'; Paartalu 69'	Stadium: Rasmee Dhandu Stadium; Attendance: 890; Referee: Ilgiz Tantashev (Uzbekistan)

20 February 2018	Bengaluru FC (India)	5–0 (8–2 agg.)	(Maldives) TC Sports	Bengaluru, India
20:00 IST	Toni 12', 35', 48'; Paartalu 36'; Bheke 90'	Report	Alaaeldin (yellow card) 37' (red card) 61'; Mahudhee (yellow card) 50'	Stadium: Sree Kanteerava Stadium; Referee: Turki Al-Khudhayr (Saudi Arabia); MVP: Toni (Bengaluru FC)

==== Group stage ====
Bengaluru FC competed in Group E alongside 2016–17 I-League champions Aizawl F.C., 2017 Dhivehi Premier League champions New Radiant S.C., and 2017–18 Bangladesh Premier League champions Dhaka Abahani.

Bengaluru kicked off their campaign against Dhaka Abahani on 14 March 2018. With upcoming Indian Super League final, Roca rested the key players and fielded the reserve side. Daniel Lalhlimpuia's goal in the second half proved sufficient as Bengaluru won the game 1–0. Bengaluru's game against Aizawl F.C. was originally scheduled on the first match day, however it was postponed to 5 April due to scheduling conflicts with Indian Super League and I-League games. Aizawl took the early lead when they capitalized on the defensive lapse of Bengaluru. However, Bengaluru equalized when they were awarded a penalty just before the half-time. Bengaluru made the most of their possession in the second half and scored two more goals, in spite of missing a penalty, and registered 3–1 win. Bengaluru then faced New Radiant S.C. at home on 10 April 2018. Having rested many key players, Bengaluru failed to find many scoring opportunities and Roca was forced introduce Sunil Chhetri late in the second half and that turned out to be significant as Chhetri managed to shake off his marker in the dying minutes and created an assist to Nishu Kumar and Bengaluru won the close game 1–0.

Bengaluru's qualification chances were dealt a blow when they lost 2–0 to New Radiant in the reverse leg. Both the teams being equal on the points, New Radiant topped the group based on their head-to-head record, leaving Bengaluru's qualification dependent on New Radiant's results. Bengaluru stayed in contention for the knockout stage with a convincing 5–0 win against Aizawl F.C. that included a brace from Daniel Segovia. In the final game of the group stage, Bengaluru FC scored a convincing 4–0 victory against Dhaka Abahani, with a brace from the defender Nishu Kumar and goals from Daniel Lucas Segovia and Sunil Chhetri. As New Radiant S.C. failed to overcome Aizawl F.C. on the final match day, Bengaluru advanced to the knock-out stage of the tournament for the fourth consecutive year, played in 2018–19 season.

Group E

Pos	Team	Pld	W	D	L	GF	GA	GD	Pts	Qualification	BFC	RAD	ABD	AIZ
1	(India) Bengaluru	6	5	0	1	14	3	+11	15	Inter-zone play-off semi-finals	—	1–0	1–0	5–0
2	(Maldives) New Radiant	6	4	0	2	12	5	+7	12		2–0	—	5–1	3–1
3	(Bangladesh) Abahani Limited Dhaka	6	1	1	4	5	12	−7	4		0–4	0–1	—	1–1
4	(India) Aizawl	6	1	1	4	5	16	−11	4 (Note: Head-to-head results: Aizawl 0–3 Abahani Limited Dhaka, Abahani Limited Dhaka 1–1 Aizawl.)		1–3	2–1	0–3	—

Source: AFC
Rules for classification: Group stage tiebreakers
Notes:

14 March 2018	Bengaluru FC (India)	1–0	(Bangladesh) Dhaka Abahani	Bengaluru, India
20:00 UTC+5:30	Akhtar (yellow card) 58'; Lalhlimpuia 72'	Report	Uddin (yellow card) 88'; Alison (yellow card) 90+1'	Stadium: Sree Kanteerava Stadium; Attendance: 1,051; Referee: Yaqoub Al-Hammadi (United Arab Emirates)

5 April 2018	Aizawl (India)	1–3	(India) Bengaluru FC	Guwahati, India
18:30 UTC+5:30	Dodoz 5'	Report	Segovia 45+1' (pen.); Bheke 63'; Lalhlimpuia 77'	Stadium: Indira Gandhi Athletic Stadium; Attendance: 879; Referee: Ahmad Ibrahim (Jordan)

10 April 2018	Bengaluru FC (India)	1–0	(Maldives) New Radiant	Bengaluru, India
20:00 UTC+5:30	Lourenco (yellow card) 10'; Bose (yellow card) 89'; Nishu 90+1'	Report	Gotor (yellow card) 35'	Stadium: Sree Kanteerava Stadium; Attendance: 1,839; Referee: Hanna Hattab (Syria)

25 April 2018	New Radiant (Maldives)	2–0	(India) Bengaluru FC	Malé, Maldives
21:00 UTC+5	Fasir 30'; Ghanee (yellow card) 34'; Ashfaq 47'	Report	Ralte (yellow card) 59'; B. Haokip (yellow card) 77'	Stadium: Rasmee Dhandu Stadium; Attendance: 3,112; Referee: Khamis Mohamed Al Kuwari (Qatar)

2 May 2018	Bengaluru FC (India)	5–0	(India) Aizawl	Bengaluru, India
20:00 UTC+5:30	Chhetri 16' (pen.); Segovia 17', 62'; Udanta 30'; Pérez (yellow card) 82'; Lalhlimpuia 89'	Report	Lalrosanga (yellow card) 71'	Stadium: Sree Kanteerava Stadium; Attendance: 1,570; Referee: Zaid Thamer (Iraq)

16 May 2018	Dhaka Abahani (Bangladesh)	0–4	(India) Bengaluru FC	Dhaka, Bangladesh
19:15 UTC+6	Faisal (yellow card) 64'	Report	Segovia 13'; Nishu 16', 58'; Chhetri 60'	Stadium: Bangabandhu National Stadium; Attendance: 750; Referee: Suhaizi Shukri (Malaysia)

=== Super Cup ===
As one of the top six teams in Indian Super League, Bengaluru FC qualified for the main round in 2018 Indian Super Cup. Bengaluru FC met the qualifier I-League side, Gokulam Kerala F.C. in Round of 16 match. Determined Gokulam Kerala side took the lead in the first half as Henry Kisekka beat the offside trap to score the goal. Bengaluru's attack in the second half paid off when Miku scored the equalizer from Udanta Singh's assist in the 70th minute. When the game destined to be heading for the extra time, man of the match Udanta Singh scored the goal in the 5th minute of injury time to secure the spot for Bengaluru in quarter-finals. In quarter-finals game, Bengaluru faced another I-League side, NEROCA F.C. Sunil Chhetri scored his second hat-trick of the season to manage a convincing 3–1 victory and set up the semi-final game against their I-League rival, Mohun Bagan A.C. Bengaluru suffered a setback when Mohun Bagan took the lead just before the half-time and Nishu Kumar was sent-off soon after the restart. However, Bengaluru continued the attack and staged a convincing 4–2 comeback that included a hat-trick for Miku.

==== Final ====
Bengaluru FC faced yet another I-League side and rival East Bengal F.C. in the final. East Bengal drew the first blood when Ansumana Kromah scored a goal from the corner kick, but East Bengal were reduced to 10-men before the half time when Samad Ali Mallick was sent-off for the violent conduct. Bengaluru dominated the proceedings in the second half as they scored four goals, a brace from Sunil Chhetri and a goal each from Miku and Rahul Bheke, and won the inaugural Super Cup 4–1. Super Cup also marked Bengaluru FC's fifth trophy in as many years.

1 April 2018 Round of 16	Bengaluru FC	2–1	Gokulam Kerala	Bhubaneswar
17:00 IST	Miku 70'; Udanta 90+5'	Report	Kisekka 32'; Musa (yellow card) 63'	Stadium: Kalinga Stadium; Attendance: 4,233; Referee: Tejas Visvasrao Nagvenkar; Man of the Match: Udanta Singh (Bengaluru FC)

13 April 2018 Quarter-final	Bengaluru FC	3–1	NEROCA	Bhubaneswar
16:00 IST	Chhetri 12', 55', 90+4'; Bose (yellow card) 58'	Report	Singh 45+3'; Vorbe (yellow card) 73'	Stadium: Kalinga Stadium; Attendance: 1,100; Referee: Tejas Nagvenkar; Man of the Match: Sunil Chhetri (Bengaluru FC)

17 April 2018 Semi-final	Mohun Bagan	2–4	Bengaluru FC	Bhubaneswar
16:00 IST	Dipanda 42', 90+2'; Gharami (yellow card) 88'	Report	Chhetri (yellow card) 38' (goal) 90'; Khabra (yellow card) 45+4'; Nishu (red card) 50'; Miku 62', 65', 89' (pen.); B. Haokip (yellow card) 69'	Stadium: Kalinga Stadium; Attendance: 3,600; Referee: Tejas Nagvenkar; Man of the Match: Miku (Bengaluru FC)

20 April 2018 Final	East Bengal	1–4	Bengaluru FC	Bhubaneswar
16:00 IST	Kromah 28' (yellow card) 74'; Aucho (yellow card) 44'; Mallick (red card) 45+2'; Amnah (yellow card) 75'	Report	Sandhu (yellow card) 8'; Bheke 39'; Chhetri 69' (pen.), 90+1'; Miku 71'; Johnson (yellow card) 88'	Stadium: Kalinga Stadium; Attendance: 9,500; Referee: C. R. Srikrishna; Man of the Match: Sunil Chhetri (Bengaluru FC)

== Management information ==
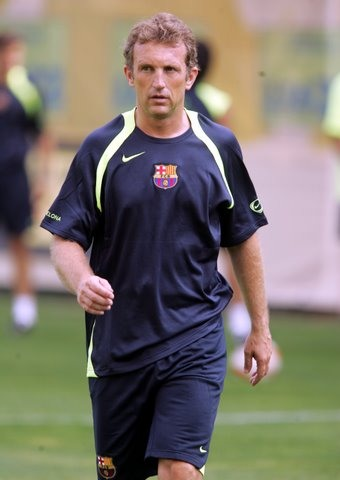
Albert Roca, Bengaluru FC's head coach for 2016–17 season

Midway through the season, Bengaluru FC parted ways with the assistant coach Carles Cuadrat owing to health concerns. He was replaced by former FC Barcelona youth coach, Marc Huguet.

As of July 2017.

Position	Name
Head coach	(Spain) Albert Roca
Assistant coach	(Spain) Marc Huguet
Assistant coach (India)	(India) Naushad Moosa
Goalkeeping coach	(Spain) Edu Gasol
Head of Youth Development	(Netherlands) John Killa
Under-18 coach	(India) John Kenneth Raj
Head physiotherapist	(South Africa) Timothy Vadachalam
Head of sports sciences	(England) Donavan Pillai

== Player statistics ==
=== Appearances and goals ===
No.	Pos	Nat	Player	Total		ISL		AFC		Super Cup	
No.	Pos	Nat	Player	Apps	Goals	Apps	Goals	Apps	Goals	Apps	Goals
Goalkeepers
1	GK	(India) IND	Gurpreet Singh Sandhu	27	0	19+0	0	4+0	0	4+0	0
23	GK	(India) IND	Abhra Mondal	1	0	0+1	0	0+0	0	0+0	0
28	GK	(India) IND	Lalthuammawia Ralte	12	0	2+0	0	10+0	0	0+0	0
32	GK	(India) IND	Calvin Abhishek	0	0	0+0	0	0+0	0	0+0	0
Defenders
2	DF	(India) IND	Rahul Bheke	32	4	19+0	0	9+1	3	3+0	1
3	DF	(India) IND	Collin Abranches	1	0	0+0	0	1+0	0	0+0	0
4	DF	(India) IND	Zohmingliana Ralte	9	0	0+1	0	6+2	0	0+0	0
5	DF	(Spain) ESP	Juanan	30	1	17+1	1	9+0	0	3+0	0
6	DF	(England) ENG	John Johnson	22	0	16+2	0	0+0	0	4+0	0
10	DF	(India) IND	Harmanjot Khabra	23	0	13+0	0	7+2	0	1+0	0
15	DF	(India) IND	Subhasish Bose	34	0	14+4	0	7+5	0	4+0	0
22	DF	(India) IND	Nishu Kumar	26	3	3+6	0	14+0	3	1+2	0
24	DF	(India) IND	Joyner Lourenco	5	0	0+0	0	2+3	0	0+0	0
27	DF	(India) IND	Prashanth Kalinga	1	0	0+0	0	1+0	0	0+0	0
33	DF	(India) IND	Asheer Akhtar	2	0	0+0	0	1+1	0	0+0	0
Midfielders
8	MF	(India) IND	Lenny Rodrigues	28	2	13+4	1	6+1	1	3+1	0
14	MF	(Spain) ESP	Dimas Delgado	21	1	16+1	1	4+0	0	0+0	0
16	MF	(Australia) AUS	Erik Paartalu	33	5	15+3	3	11+0	2	3+1	0
17	MF	(India) IND	Boithang Haokip	21	2	6+4	1	5+3	1	1+2	0
19	MF	(Spain) ESP	Toni	25	3	6+7	0	7+1	3	1+3	0
20	MF	(India) IND	Alwyn George	16	0	0+7	0	7+2	0	0+0	0
29	MF	(India) IND	Myron Mendes	1	0	0+0	0	0+1	0	0+0	0
30	MF	(India) IND	Malsawmzuala	12	0	0+0	0	7+4	0	0+1	0
38	MF	(India) IND	Robinson Singh	1	0	0+0	0	1+0	0	0+0	0
39	MF	(India) IND	Leon Augustine	1	0	0+0	0	0+1	0	0+0	0
44	MF	(Spain) ESP	Víctor Pérez Alonso	11	0	0+1	0	5+1	0	4+0	0
	MF	(India) IND	Bidyananda Singh	0	0	0+0	0	0+0	0	0+0	0
	MF	(India) IND	Ragav Gupta	0	0	0+0	0	0+0	0	0+0	0
Forwards
7	FW	(Venezuela) VEN	Miku	24	20	20+0	15	0+0	0	4+0	5
11	FW	(India) IND	Sunil Chhetri	33	24	21+0	14	7+1	4	4+0	6
12	FW	(Spain) ESP	Daniel Segovia	10	4	0+5	0	4+1	4	0+0	0
18	FW	(India) IND	Thongkhosiem Haokip	11	3	1+1	0	7+2	3	0+0	0
21	FW	(India) IND	Udanta Singh	32	4	16+3	1	8+1	2	4+0	1
25	FW	(India) IND	Daniel Lalhlimpuia	15	4	0+2	0	4+8	4	0+1	0
26	FW	(India) IND	Cletus Paul	1	0	0+0	0	0+1	0	0+0	0
Players transferred out during the season
~~9~~	FW	(Spain) ESP	Braulio Nóbrega	10	0	2+8	0	0+0	0	0+0	0
~~13~~	MF	(Spain) ESP	Edu García	14	2	12+2	2	0+0	0	0+0	0

- Source: soccerway

Updated: 16 May 2018

=== Top scorers ===
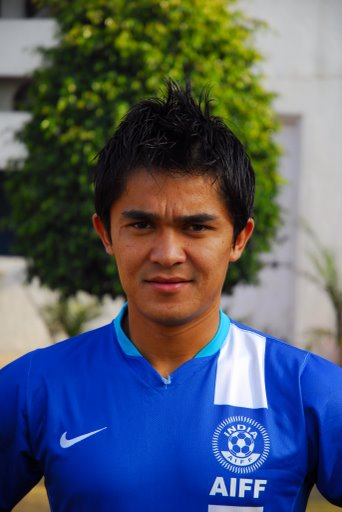
Sunil Chhetri scored two hat-tricks in the season

Rank	No.	Pos	Nat	Player	ISL	AFC	Super Cup	Total
1	11	FW	(India)	Sunil Chhetri	14	4	6	24
2	7	FW	(Venezuela)	Miku	15	0	5	20
3	16	MF	(Australia)	Erik Paartalu	3	2	0	5
4	2	DF	(India)	Rahul Bheke	0	3	1	4
4	12	FW	(Spain)	Daniel Lucas Segovia	0	4	0	4
4	21	FW	(India)	Udanta Singh	1	2	1	4
4	25	FW	(India)	Daniel Lalhlimpuia	0	4	0	4
8	18	FW	(India)	Thongkhosiem Haokip	0	3	0	3
8	19	MF	(Spain)	Toni	0	3	0	3
8	22	DF	(India)	Nishu Kumar	0	3	0	3
11	8	MF	(India)	Lenny Rodrigues	1	1	0	2
11	13	MF	(Spain)	Edu García	2	0	0	2
11	17	MF	(India)	Boithang Haokip	1	1	0	2
14	5	DF	(Spain)	Juanan	1	0	0	1
14	14	MF	(Spain)	Dimas Delgado	1	0	0	1
Own Goals					1	0	0	1
TOTALS					40	29	13	82

Source: soccerway
Updated: 16 May 2018

=== Clean sheets ===
Rank	No.	Pos	Nat	Player	ISL	AFC	Super Cup	Total
1	45	GK	(India)	Gurpreet Singh Sandhu	7	2	0	9
2	28	GK	(India)	Lalthuammawia Ralte	1	7	0	8
3	23	GK	(India)	Abhra Mondal	0	0	0	0
TOTALS					8	9	0	17

Source: soccerway
Updated: 16 May 2018

=== Disciplinary record ===
Rank	No.	Pos	Nat	Player	ISL		AFC		Super Cup		Total		Notes
Rank	No.	Pos	Nat	Player	Yellow card	Red card	Yellow card	Red card	Yellow card	Red card	Yellow card	Red card	Notes
1	10	MF	(India)	Harmanjot Khabra	4	0	1	1	1	0	6	1	Missed a game, against ATK (4 yellow cards) (3 February 2018)
2	15	DF	(India)	Subhasish Bose	3	1	1	0	1	0	5	1	Missed a game, against Mumbai City (red card) (18 January 2018); Missed ISL Final, against Chennaiyin (2 yellow cards in playoffs) (17 March 2018)
3	4	DF	(Spain)	Juanan	4	0	1	0	0	0	5	0	Missed a game, against Kerala Blasters (4 yellow cards) (1 March 2018)
3	6	DF	(England)	John Johnson	4	0	0	0	1	0	5	0	Missed a game, against Kerala Blasters (4 yellow cards) (1 March 2018)
3	17	MF	(India)	Boithang Haokip	2	0	2	0	1	0	5	0	
6	1	GK	(India)	Gurpreet Singh Sandhu	1	1	1	0	1	0	3	1	Suspended for 2 games (red card) (December 2017)
6	11	FW	(India)	Sunil Chhetri	3	0	0	0	1	0	4	0	
6	14	MF	(Spain)	Dimas Delgado	3	0	1	0	0	0	4	0	
9	2	DF	(India)	Rahul Bheke	2	1	0	0	0	0	2	1	Missed a game, against Chennaiyin (red card) (6 February 2018)
9	8	MF	(India)	Lenny Rodrigues	2	0	1	0	0	0	3	0	
11	7	FW	(Venezuela)	Miku	2	0	0	0	0	0	2	0	
11	16	MF	(Australia)	Erik Paartalu	2	0	0	0	0	0	2	0	
11	22	DF	(India)	Nishu Kumar	0	0	1	0	0	1	1	1	Missed Super Cup Final, against East Bengal (red card) (20 April 2018)
14	18	FW	(India)	Thongkhosiem Haokip	0	0	1	0	0	0	1	0	
14	23	GK	(India)	Abhra Mondal	1	0	0	0	0	0	1	0	
14	24	DF	(India)	Joyner Lourenco	0	0	1	0	0	0	1	0	
14	28	GK	(India)	Lalthuammawia Ralte	0	0	1	0	0	0	1	0	
14	33	DF	(India)	Asheer Akhtar	0	0	1	0	0	0	1	0	
14	44	MF	(Spain)	Víctor Pérez Alonso	0	0	1	0	0	0	1	0	
14	49	MF	(Spain)	Toni	0	0	1	0	0	0	1	0	
TOTALS					33	3	15	1	6	1	54	5	

Source: soccerway
Updated: 16 May 2018

== Awards ==
=== Player of the Month award ===
Awarded monthly to the player that was chosen by fan voting

Month	Player	Votes
November	(Australia) Erik Paartalu	57%
December	(Venezuela) Miku	66%
January	(India) Sunil Chhetri	58%
February	(Spain) Dimas Delgado	41%
March	(India) Udanta Singh	41%
April	(Spain) Víctor Pérez Alonso	33%

=== Club's Annual Awards ===
Bengaluru FC's Annual Awards Night for the 2017–18 season, held at the JW Marriott, in Bengaluru, on 17 May 2018.

Award	Player
Top scorer	(India) Sunil Chhetri
Players' Player of the year	(India) Sunil Chhetri
Fans' Player of the Year	(India) Gurpreet Singh Sandhu
Goal of the Season	(Venezuela) Miku
Upcoming Player of the Year	(India) Asheer Akhtar
U18 Player of the Year	(India) Biswa Darjee
U15 Player of the Year	(India) Bekey Oram

=== FPAI Annual Awards ===
Football Players Association of India's Annual Awards for the 2017–18 season, held at the Calkutta Sports Journalist Club, in Kolkata, on 12 June 2018.

Award	Player
Coach of the year	(Spain) Albert Roca
Indian Player of the year	(India) Sunil Chhetri
Foreign Player of the Year	(Venezuela) Miku

== See also ==
- 2017–18 in Indian football
