= 2017–18 in Indian football =

Football in India
- Season: 2017–18

Men's football
- I-League: Minerva Punjab
- ISL: Chennaiyin
- I-League 2nd Div.: Real Kashmir
- Super Cup: Bengaluru

Women's football
- IWL: Rising Students

The 2017–18 season is the 130th competitive association football season in India.

== National teams ==
=== India national football team ===
==== 2019 AFC Asian Cup qualifiers ====
Pos	Team	Pld	W	D	L	GF	GA	GD	Pts	Qualification	India	Kyrgyzstan	Myanmar	Macau
1	India	6	4	1	1	11	5	+6	13 (Note: Head-to-head results: India 1–0 Kyrgyzstan, Kyrgyzstan 2–1 India (India are ahead of Kyrgyzstan on head to head away goals).)	2019 AFC Asian Cup	—	1–0	2–2	4–1
2	Kyrgyzstan	6	4	1	1	14	8	+6	13	2019 AFC Asian Cup	2–1	—	5–1	1–0
3	Myanmar	6	2	2	2	10	10	0	8		0–1	2–2	—	1–0
4	Macau	6	0	0	6	4	16	−12	0		0–2	3–4	0–4	—

Source: AFC
Notes:

28 March 2017 Match 1	Myanmar	0–1	India	Yangon, Myanmar
18:00 UTC+6:30		Report	Chhetri 90+1'	Stadium: Thuwunna Stadium; Attendance: 21,025; Referee: Yu Ming-hsun (Chinese Taipei)

13 June 2017 Match 2	India	1–0	Kyrgyzstan	Bangalore, India
	Chhetri	Report		Stadium: Sree Kanteerava Stadium; Attendance: 6,213; Referee: Yudai Yamamoto (Japan)

5 September 2017 Match 3	Macau	0–2	India	Taipa, Macau
		Report	B. Singh 57', 82'	Stadium: Estádio Campo Desportivo; Attendance: 600; Referee: Ahmed Faisal (Jordan)

10 October 2017 Match 4	India	4–1	Macau	Bangalore, India
19:30	Borges 28'; Chhetri 60'; Ka Seng 70' (o.g.); Lalpekhlua 90+2'	Report	Torrão 37'	Stadium: Sree Kanteerava Stadium; Attendance: 4,113; Referee: Yaqoob Abdul Baki (Oman)

14 November 2017 Match 5	India	2–2	Myanmar	Margao, India
	Chhetri 13' (pen.); Lalpekhlua 69'	Report	Yan Naing Oo 1'; Kyaw Ko Ko 19'	Stadium: Fatorda Stadium; Attendance: 5,546; Referee: Liu Kwok Man (Hong Kong)

27 March 2018 Match 6	Kyrgyzstan	2–1	India	Bishkek, Kyrgyzstan
20:00 UTC+6	Zemlianukhin 2'; Murzaev 72'	Report	Lalpekhlua 88'	Stadium: Dolen Omurzakov Stadium; Attendance: 9,588; Referee: Ammar Al-Jeneibi (United Arab Emirates)

==== Friendlies ====
6 June 2017	India	2–0	Nepal	Mumbai, India
	Jhingan 60'; Lalpekhlua 78'	Report		Stadium: Mumbai Football Arena

19 August 2017 Tri-Nation Series	India	2–1	Mauritius	Mumbai, India
	R. Singh 37'; B. Singh 62'	Report	Jocelyn 15'	Stadium: Mumbai Football Arena; Referee: Dilan Perera (Sri Lanka)

24 August 2017 Tri-Nation Series	India	1–1	Saint Kitts and Nevis	Mumbai, India
	J. Singh 38'	Report	Amory 71'	Stadium: Mumbai Football Arena; Referee: Dilan Perera (Sri Lanka)

==== Goalscorers ====
Updated 10 June 2018 after match against Kenya.

Player	Goals
Sunil Chhetri	11
Jeje Lalpekhlua	5
Balwant Singh	3
Sandesh Jhingan	1
Robin Singh	1
Jackichand Singh	1
Rowllin Borges	1
Udanta Singh	1
Pronay Halder	1

==== Debutants ====
- Jerry Lalrinzuala against Nepal on 6 June 2017.
- Nikhil Poojari against Mauritius on 19 August 2017.
- Amrinder Singh against Mauritius on 19 August 2017.
- Manvir Singh against Mauritius on 19 August 2017.
- Anirudh Thapa against Saint Kitts and Nevis on 24 August 2017.
- Salam Ranjan Singh against Macau on 10 October 2017.

=== India national under-23 football team ===
==== 2018 AFC U-23 Championship qualifiers ====
Pos	Team	Pld	W	D	L	GF	GA	GD	Pts	Qualification
1	Qatar (H)	3	2	1	0	4	1	+3	7	Final tournament
2	Syria	3	1	2	0	3	1	+2	5	Final tournament
3	India	3	1	0	2	3	4	−1	3	
4	Turkmenistan	3	0	1	2	1	5	−4	1	

Source: AFC
(H) Hosts

19 July 2017 Match 1	Syria	2–0	India	Doha, Qatar
17:00 UTC+3	Srour 64'; Arnaout 88'	Report		Stadium: Jassim Bin Hamad Stadium; Attendance: 853; Referee: Kim Hee-gon (South Korea)

21 July 2017 Match 2	India	0–1	Qatar	Doha, Qatar
20:00 UTC+3		Report	Ali 54'	Stadium: Jassim Bin Hamad Stadium; Attendance: 2,768; Referee: Chen Hsin-chuan (Chinese Taipei)

23 July 2017 Match 3	India	3–1	Turkmenistan	Doha, Qatar
17:00 UTC+3	Singh 41'; Deory 72'; Lalrinzuala 77' (pen.)	Report	Hojovov 13'	Stadium: Jassim Bin Hamad Stadium; Attendance: 312; Referee: Kim Hee-gon (South Korea)

==== Friendlies ====
9 July 2017 Friendly	Singapore	0–1	India	Choa Chu Kang, Singapore
		Report	G. Singh 80'	Stadium: Choa Chu Kang Stadium

12 July 2017 Friendly	Singapore	1–0	India	Choa Chu Kang, Singapore
	Fandi 51'	Report		Stadium: Choa Chu Kang Stadium

=== India national under-20 football team ===
==== 2018 AFC U-19 Championship qualifiers ====
Pos	Team	Pld	W	D	L	GF	GA	GD	Pts	Qualification
1	Saudi Arabia (H)	3	3	0	0	8	1	+7	9	Final tournament
2	Yemen	3	1	1	1	4	2	+2	4	
3	India	3	1	1	1	3	5	−2	4	
4	Turkmenistan	3	0	0	3	0	7	−7	0	

Source: AFC
Rules for classification: Qualification tiebreakers
(H) Hosts

4 November 2017 Match 1	Saudi Arabia	5–0	India	Dammam, Saudi Arabia
	Al-Hamddan 15'; Al-Brikan 50', 81', 86'; Al-Shahrani 75'	Report		Stadium: Prince Mohamed bin Fahd Stadium; Attendance: 4,962; Referee: Mohammad Arafah (Jordan)

6 November 2017 Match 2	India	0–0	Yemen	Dammam, Saudi Arabia
		Report		Stadium: Prince Mohamed bin Fahd Stadium; Attendance: 6,370; Referee: Hussein Abo Yehia (Lebanon)

8 November 2017 Match 3	Turkmenistan	0–3	India	Dammam, Saudi Arabia
		Report	Singh Kiyam 74'; Halder 80'; Lalrindika 90+3'	Stadium: Prince Mohamed bin Fahd Stadium; Attendance: 3,400; Referee: Hussein Abo Yehia (Lebanon)

==== 2017 SAFF U-18 Championship ====
Pos	Team	Pld	W	D	L	GF	GA	GD	Pts	Status
1	Nepal (C)	4	3	0	1	6	2	+4	9 (Note: Nepal ahead of Bangladesh on head-to-head points: Bangladesh 1–2 Nepal)	Champion
2	Bangladesh	4	3	0	1	9	5	+4	9	
3	India	4	2	0	2	8	7	+1	6 (Note: India ahead of Bhutan on head-to-head points: India 3–0 Bhutan)	
4	Bhutan (H)	4	2	0	2	2	5	−3	6	
5	Maldives	4	0	0	4	1	7	−6	0	

Source: Futbol24
Rules for classification: 1) points; 2) head-to-head points; 3) head-to-head goal difference; 4) goal difference; 5) number of goals scored;
(C) Champions; (H) Hosts
Notes:

18 September 2017 Match 1	Bangladesh	4–3	India	Thimphu, Bhutan
	Iqbal 55', 90+1'; Mia 60'; Rahman 74'	Report	Lalawmpuia 18'; Laldinrika 32' (pen.); Rebello 47'	Stadium: Changlimithang Stadium; Referee: Farook M. Irshad (Sri Lanka)

22 September 2017 Match 2	India	3–0	Bhutan	Thimphu, Bhutan
	Lalawmpuia 38', 78'; Rai 90+1'	Report		Stadium: Changlimithang Stadium; Referee: Laba Khatri (Nepal)

25 September 2017 Match 3	India	2–1	Maldives	Thimphu, Bhutan
	Rebello 37'; Halder 41'	Report	Tholal 18'	Stadium: Changlimithang Stadium; Referee: Abdur Rahman Dhali (Bangladesh)

27 September 2017 Match 4	Nepal	2–0	India	Thimphu, Bhutan
	Henjan 2', 37'	Report		Stadium: Changlimithang Stadium; Referee: Ugyen Dorji (Bhutan

==== Friendlies ====
28 October 2017 Friendly	Qatar	1–0	India	Doha, Qatar
	12'	Report		Stadium: Grand Hamad Stadium

=== India national under-17 football team ===
==== 2017 FIFA U-17 World Cup ====
Pos	Team	Pld	W	D	L	GF	GA	GD	Pts	Qualification
1	Ghana	3	2	0	1	5	1	+4	6	Knockout stage
2	Colombia	3	2	0	1	5	3	+2	6 (Note: Head-to-head points: Colombia 3, United States 0.)	Knockout stage
3	United States	3	2	0	1	5	3	+2	6	Knockout stage
4	India (H)	3	0	0	3	1	9	−8	0	

Source: FIFA
Rules for classification: Group stage tiebreakers
(H) Hosts
Notes:

6 October 2017 Match 1	India	0–3	United States	Delhi, India
20:00		Report	Sargent 30' (pen.); Durkin 51'; Carlton 84'	Stadium: Jawaharlal Nehru Stadium; Attendance: 46,351; Referee: Gery Vargas (Bolivia)

9 October 2017 Match 2	India	1–2	Colombia	Delhi, India
20:00	J. Singh 82'	Report	Peñaloza 49', 83'	Stadium: Jawaharlal Nehru Stadium; Attendance: 48,184; Referee: Ricardo Montero (Costa Rica)

12 October 2017 Match 3	Ghana	4–0	India	Delhi, India
20:00	Ayiah 43', 52'; Danso 86'; Toku 87'	Report		Stadium: Jawaharlal Nehru Stadium; Attendance: 52,614; Referee: Abdelkader Zitouni (Tahiti)

==== 2018 AFC U-16 Championship qualifiers ====
Pos	Team	Pld	W	D	L	GF	GA	GD	Pts	Qualification
1	Iraq	3	2	1	0	5	0	+5	7	Final tournament
2	India	3	1	2	0	5	2	+3	5	Final tournament
3	Palestine	3	1	0	2	2	8	−6	3	
4	Nepal (H)	3	0	1	2	3	5	−2	1	

Source: AFC
Rules for classification: Qualification tiebreakers
(H) Hosts

20 September 2017 Match 1	India	3–0	Palestine	Kathmandu, Nepal
	G. Moirangthem 53'; Oram 74'; V. Singh 82'	Report		Stadium: ANFA Complex; Attendance: 50; Referee: Mongkolchai Pechsri (Thailand)

22 September 2017 Match 2	Nepal	2–2	India	Kathmandu, Nepal
	B. Chaudhary 76', 88'	Report	Rulbir 83', 85'	Stadium: ANFA Complex; Attendance: 200; Referee: Lakmal (Sri Lanka)

24 September 2017 Match 3	Iraq	0–0	India	Kathmandu, Nepal
		Report		Stadium: ANFA Complex; Attendance: 100; Referee: Dmitry Mashentsev (Kyrgyzstan)

==== 2017 SAFF U-15 Championship ====
Pos	Team	Pld	Pts
1	India	2	6
2	Nepal (H)	2	3
3	Maldives	2	0

Source: GoalNepal
(H) Hosts

19 August 2017 Group Stage	India	9–0	Maldives	Kathmandu, Nepal
15:00	R. Rana 20', 26', 48' (o.g.); T. Moirangthem 41'; R. Shabong 57'; V. Singh 70'; Lalrokima 80' (o.g.)	Report		Stadium: ANFA Complex; Referee: Golam Choudhary (Bangladesh)

23 August 2017 Group Stage	Nepal	1–2	India	Kathmandu, Nepal
15:00	R. Magar 40' (pen.)	Report	V. Singh 27'; R. Rana 64'	Stadium: ANFA Complex; Referee: Ugyen Dorji (Bhutan)

25 August 2017 Semi-final	Bhutan	0–3	India	Kathmandu, Nepal
15:00		Report	V. Singh 20'; Rulbir 75'; Demello 91'	Stadium: ANFA Complex; Referee: Golam Choudhary (Bangladesh)

27 August 2017 Final	Nepal	1–2	India	Kathmandu, Nepal
15:00	B. Chaudhary 41' (pen.)	Report	Lalrokima 58'; V. Singh 74'	Stadium: ANFA Complex

== AFC competitions ==
=== 2017 AFC Cup ===
==== Inter-zone play-off semi-finals ====
Team 1	Agg.	Team 2	1st leg	2nd leg
Bengaluru (India)	3–0	(North Korea) April 25	3–0	0–0

==== Inter-zone play-off final ====
Team 1	Agg.	Team 2	1st leg	2nd leg
Istiklol (Tajikistan)	3–2	(India) Bengaluru	1–0	2–2

=== 2018 AFC Champions League ===
==== Play-off Round ====
Team 1	Score	Team 2
West Region
Zob Ahan (Iran)	3–1	(India) Aizawl

=== 2018 AFC Cup ===
==== Play-off Round ====
Team 1	Agg.	Team 2	1st leg	2nd leg
South Asia Zone
TC Sports (Maldives)	2–8	(India) Bengaluru	2–3	0–5

==== Preliminary round ====
Team 1	Agg.	Team 2	1st leg	2nd leg
South Asia Zone
Transport United (Bhutan)	0–3	(India) Bengaluru	0–0	0–3

==== Group stage ====
Group E

Pos	Team	Pld	W	D	L	GF	GA	GD	Pts	Qualification	BFC	RAD	ABD	AIZ
1	(India) Bengaluru	6	5	0	1	14	3	+11	15	Inter-zone play-off semi-finals	—	1–0	1–0	5–0
2	(Maldives) New Radiant	6	4	0	2	12	5	+7	12		2–0	—	5–1	3–1
3	(Bangladesh) Abahani Limited Dhaka	6	1	1	4	5	12	−7	4		0–4	0–1	—	1–1
4	(India) Aizawl	6	1	1	4	5	16	−11	4 (Note: Head-to-head results: Aizawl 0–3 Abahani Limited Dhaka, Abahani Limited Dhaka 1–1 Aizawl.)		1–3	2–1	0–3	—

Source: AFC

== Club competitions ==
=== Indian Super League ===
==== Teams added ====
- Bengaluru
- Jamshedpur

==== League table ====
Pos	Team	Pld	W	D	L	GF	GA	GD	Pts	Qualification or relegation
1	Bengaluru	18	13	1	4	35	16	+19	40	Qualification for ISL play-offs
2	Chennaiyin (Note: Qualified for 2019 AFC Cup qualifying play-offs) (C)	18	9	5	4	24	19	+5	32	Qualification for ISL play-offs
3	Goa	18	9	3	6	42	28	+14	30	Qualification for ISL play-offs
4	Pune City	18	9	3	6	30	21	+9	30	Qualification for ISL play-offs
5	Jamshedpur	18	7	5	6	16	18	−2	26	
6	Kerala Blasters	18	6	7	5	20	22	−2	25	
7	Mumbai City	18	7	2	9	25	29	−4	23	
8	Delhi Dynamos	18	5	4	9	27	37	−10	19	
9	ATK	18	4	4	10	16	30	−14	16	
10	NorthEast United	18	3	2	13	12	27	−15	11	

Source: Indian Super League
Rules for classification: 1) points; 2) head-to-head points; 3) head-to-head goal difference; 4) head-to-head goals scored; 5) goal difference; 5) number of goals scored; 6) fair play ranking; 6) drawing of lots
(C) Champions

==== Results ====
Home \ Away	KOL	BEN	CHE	DEL	GOA	JAM	KER	MUM	NEU	PUN
ATK	—	0–2	1–2	1–0	1–1	0–1	2–2	1–2	1–0	1–4
Bengaluru	1–0	—	1–2	4–1	2–0	0–1	2–0	2–0	2–1	1–1
Chennaiyin	3–2	1–3	—	2–2	2–3	1–1	1–1	1–0	3–0	1–0
Delhi Dynamos	4–3	2–0	1–1	—	1–5	0–1	1–3	5–1	0–2	2–2
Goa	5–1	4–3	0–1	1–1	—	2–1	5–2	3–4	2–2	0–2
Jamshedpur	0–0	0–2	0–1	3–2	0–3	—	2–1	2–2	1–0	0–1
Kerala Blasters	0–0	1–3	0–0	2–1	1–2	0–0	—	1–1	1–0	1–1
Mumbai City	0–1	1–3	1–0	4–0	2–1	1–2	0–1	—	3–2	0–2
NorthEast United	0–1	0–1	3–1	0–1	2–1	0–0	0–1	0–2	—	0–1
Pune City	3–0	1–3	0–1	2–3	0–4	2–1	1–2	2–1	5–0	—

Source: Indian Super League
Legend: Blue = home team win; Yellow = draw; Red = away team win.

==== Bracket ====
Semi-finals
1	Bengaluru	0	3	3
4	Pune City	0	1	1
2	Chennaiyin	1	3	4
3	Goa	1	0	1

Final
1	Bengaluru	2
2	Chennaiyin	3

==== Semi-finals ====
Team 1	Agg.	Team 2	1st leg	2nd leg
Pune City	1–3	Bengaluru	0–0	1–3
Goa	1–4	Chennaiyin	1–1	0–3

==== Final ====
17 March 2018
20:00 IST

Bengaluru	2–3	Chennaiyin
Chhetri 9'; Miku 90+2'	Report	Alves 17', 45'; Augusto 67'

Sree Kanteerava Stadium, Bengaluru
Attendance: 25,753
Referee: Ali Abdulnabi

=== I-League ===
==== Promotion and relegation ====
Teams promoted

- NEROCA

Teams relegated

- Mumbai

==== League table ====
Pos	Team	Pld	W	D	L	GF	GA	GD	Pts	Qualification or relegation
1	Minerva Punjab (C)	18	11	2	5	24	16	+8	35	Qualification to 2019 AFC Champions League qualifier
2	NEROCA	18	9	5	4	20	13	+7	32	
3	Mohun Bagan	18	8	7	3	28	14	+14	31	
4	East Bengal	18	8	7	3	32	19	+13	31	
5	Aizawl	18	6	6	6	21	18	+3	24	
6	Shillong Lajong	18	6	4	8	17	25	−8	22	
7	Gokulam Kerala	18	6	3	9	17	23	−6	21	
8	Chennai City	18	4	7	7	15	24	−9	19	
9	Churchill Brothers (Note: Churchill Brothers were relegated, but reinstated after the appeal.)	18	5	2	11	17	28	−11	17	
10	Indian Arrows (Note: Indian Arrows were exempted from relegation, as they are an AIFF developmental team.)	18	4	3	11	13	24	−11	15	

Source: i-league.org
Rules for classification: 1) points; 2) head-to-head points; 3) head-to-head goal difference; 4) goal difference; 5) number of goals scored; 6) drawing of lots
(C) Champions

==== Results table ====
Home \ Away	AIZ	CHE	CB	KEB	IA	GK	MP	MB	NFC	SHI
Aizawl	—	2–0	1–0	0–0	3–0	3–1	2–1	1–1	1–2	0–1
Chennai City	1–1	—	3–1	1–2	0–0	0–1	2–1	0–0	0–0	0–0
Churchill Brothers	1–0	0–2	—	1–1	2–0	1–1	2–1	1–2	0–1	2–0
East Bengal	2–2	7–1	3–2	—	1–0	1–0	2–2	0–2	1–1	5–1
Indian Arrows	2–2	3–0	2–1	0–2	—	0–2	0–2	0–2	0–2	3–0
Gokulam Kerala	0–2	1–1	2–3	2–1	0–1	—	0–1	1–1	0–3	3–2
Minerva Punjab	2–0	2–1	1–0	0–1	1–0	0–1	—	1–1	2–1	3–2
Mohun Bagan	2–0	1–2	5–0	1–0	1–1	1–2	1–2	—	0–0	1–1
NEROCA	0–0	2–1	1–0	1–1	2–1	1–0	0–1	2–3	—	0–2
Shillong Lajong	2–1	0–0	2–0	2–2	1–0	1–0	0–1	0–3	0–1	—

Source: I-League
Legend: Blue = home team win; Yellow = draw; Red = away team win.

=== I-League 2nd Division ===
==== Preliminary round ====
Group A
Pos	Team	Pld	W	D	L	GF	GA	GD	Pts	Qualification
1	Real Kashmir	10	6	4	0	15	8	+7	22	Advance to Final round
2	Hindustan	10	5	5	0	13	7	+6	20	Advance to Final round
3	Pune City (R) (Note: Reserves team are ineligible for advance to the next round)	10	2	7	1	10	9	+1	13	
4	Delhi United	10	1	6	3	10	11	−1	9	
5	Delhi Dynamos (R)	9	2	2	5	5	9	−4	8	
6	Lonestar Kashmir	9	0	2	7	9	18	−9	2	

Source: soccerway
Notes:

Group B
Pos	Team	Pld	W	D	L	GF	GA	GD	Pts	Qualification
1	Kerala Blasters (R) (Note: Reserves team are ineligible for advance to the next round)	10	7	0	3	25	17	+8	21	
2	Ozone	10	5	4	1	19	3	+16	19	Advance to Final round
3	FC Kerala	10	6	1	3	19	12	+7	19	
4	Fateh Hyderabad	10	5	2	3	23	16	+7	17	
5	Goa (R)	10	2	3	5	13	15	−2	9	
6	Madhya Bharat	10	0	0	10	3	39	−36	0	

Updated to match(es) played on unknown. Source: soccerway
Notes:

Group C
Pos	Team	Pld	W	D	L	GF	GA	GD	Pts	Qualification
1	TRAU	10	7	2	1	26	9	+17	23	Advance to Final round
2	Bengaluru (R) (Note: Reserves team are ineligible for advance to the next round)	10	5	2	3	19	13	+6	17	
3	Langsning	10	4	3	3	16	9	+7	15	
4	Jamshedpur (R)	10	3	2	5	11	22	−11	11	
5	Mohammedan	10	3	3	4	12	13	−1	12	
6	Chennaiyin (R)	10	2	0	8	8	26	−18	6	

Updated to match(es) played on unknown. Source: soccerway

==== Final round ====
Pos	Team	Pld	W	D	L	GF	GA	GD	Pts	Qualification
1	Real Kashmir (C)	3	2	1	0	8	6	+2	7	Promotion to 2018–19 I-League
2	Hindustan	3	1	1	1	5	5	0	4	
3	Ozone	3	0	2	1	4	5	−1	2	
4	TRAU	3	0	2	1	2	3	−1	2	

Source: I-league
(C) Champions

=== Indian Women's League ===
==== Group stage ====
Pos	Team	Pld	W	D	L	GF	GA	GD	Pts	Qualification
1	KRYPHSA	6	4	2	0	24	3	+21	14	Semi Final
2	Eastern Sporting Union	6	4	2	0	11	5	+6	14	Semi Final
3	Sethu	6	4	1	1	11	9	+2	13	Semi Final
4	Rising Students Club	6	3	1	2	11	5	+6	10	Semi Final
5	Gokulam Kerala	6	1	1	4	6	12	−6	4	
6	Indira Gandhi AS&E	6	1	0	5	8	29	−21	3	
7	Rush Soccer	6	0	1	5	4	12	−8	1	

Source: AIFF
Rules for classification: 1) points; 2) head-to-head points; 3) head-to-head goal difference; 4) goal difference; 5) number of goals scored; 6) drawing of lots

==== Knock-out stage ====
Semi-finals
1	KRYPHSA	0 (3)
4	Rising Student	0 (4)
3	Eastern Sporting Union	2
2	Sethu	0

Final
Rising Student	1 (5)
Eastern Sporting Union	1 (4)

=== Super Cup ===
Round of 16
31 March
Aizawl (pen.)	2 (5)
Chennaiyin	2 (3)
5 April
East Bengal	2
Mumbai City	1
2 April
Minerva Punjab	0 (4)
Jamshedpur (pen.)	0 (5)
3 April
Goa	3
ATK	1
1 April
Churchill Brothers	1
Mohun Bagan	2
4 April
Pune City	2
Shillong Lajong	3
1 April
Bengaluru	2
Gokulam Kerala	1
6 April
NEROCA	3
Kerala Blasters	2

Quarter-finals
8 April
Aizawl	0
East Bengal	1
12 April
Jamshedpur	1
Goa	5
11 April
Mohun Bagan	3
Shillong Lajong	1
13 April
Bengaluru	3
NEROCA	1

Semi-finals
16 April
East Bengal	1
Goa	0
17 April
Mohun Bagan	2
Bengaluru	4

Final
20 April
East Bengal	1
Bengaluru	4

=== Club managerial changes ===
This is a list of changes of managers within Indian league football:

Team	Outgoing coach	Manner of departure	Date of vacancy	Position in table	Incoming coach	Date of appointment
Goa	(Brazil) Zico	Contract finished	18 December 2016	Pre-season	(Spain) Sergio Lobera	6 June 2017
East Bengal	(India) Mridul Banerjee	Mutual consent	22 June 2017	Pre-season	(India) Khalid Jamil	22 June 2017
Delhi Dynamos	(Italy) Gianluca Zambrotta	Mutual consent	14 June 2017	Pre-season	(Spain) Miguel Ángel Portugal	29 June 2017
Chennaiyin	(Italy) Marco Materazzi	Mutual consent	6 March 2017	Pre-season	(England) John Gregory	3 July 2017
Jamshedpur	Expansion club			Pre-season	(England) Steve Coppell	14 July 2017
Kerala Blasters	(England) Steve Coppell	Mutual consent	12 July 2017	Pre-season	(Netherlands) René Meulensteen	14 July 2017
ATK	(Spain) José Francisco Molina	Mutual consent	18 December 2016	Pre-season	(England) Teddy Sheringham	14 July 2017
NorthEast United	(Portugal) Nelo Vingada	Mutual consent	15 May 2017	Pre-season	(Portugal) João de Deus	17 July 2017
Aizawl	(India) Khalid Jamil	Mutual consent	22 June 2017	Pre-season	(Portugal) Paulo Menezes	28 July 2017
Pune City	(Spain) Antonio López Habas	Mutual consent	15 September 2017	Pre-season	(Serbia) Ranko Popović	25 September 2017
Churchill Brothers	(India) Alfred Fernandes	Unknown		Pre-season	(Ukraine) Mykola Shevchenko	13 November 2017
Minerva Punjab	(India) Surinder Singh	Unknown		Pre-season	(India) Wangkhem Khogen Singh	24 November 2017
Indian Arrows	New direct entry club			Pre-season	(Portugal) Luís Norton de Matos	29 November 2017
Shillong Lajong	(India) Thangboi Singto	Mutual consent	7 June 2017	Pre-season	(India) Bobby Nongbet	Unknown
Kerala Blasters	(Netherlands) René Meulensteen	Sacked	3 January 2018	8th	(England) David James	3 January 2018
NorthEast United	(Portugal) João de Deus	Sacked	3 January 2018	9th	(Israel) Avram Grant	12 January 2018
ATK	(England) Teddy Sheringham	Sacked	24 January 2018	8th	(England) Ashley Westwood (Interim)	24 January 2018
Aizawl	(Portugal) Paulo Menezes	Sacked	12 February 2018	5th	(India) Santosh Kashyap	14 February 2018
ATK	(England) Ashley Westwood	Resignation	2 March 2018	9th	(Republic of Ireland) Robbie Keane (Player Manager)	3 March 2018
