= 2018 Indian Super League playoffs =

Tournament details
- Country: India
- Teams: 4

Final positions
- Champions: Chennaiyin
- Runners-up: Bengaluru
- Semifinalists: Goa; Pune City

Tournament statistics
- Matches played: 5
- Goals scored: 14 (2.8 per match)
- Top goal scorer(s): Sunil Chhetri (4 goals)

The 2018 Indian Super League playoffs was fourth playoffs series in the Indian Super League, one of the top Indian professional football leagues. The playoffs began on 7 March 2018 and concluded with the final on 17 March 2018 in Bangalore.

The top four teams from the 2017–18 ISL regular season had qualified for the playoffs. The semi-finals took place over two legs while the final was a one-off match at the Sree Kanteerava Stadium. Chennaiyin won the final after defeating Bengaluru 3–2. This would be the second time that Chennaiyin won the title.

The defending champions from last season, ATK, failed to qualify for the playoffs this season and thus were not able to defend their title.

== Season table ==
Pos	Team	Pld	W	D	L	GF	GA	GD	Pts	Qualification or relegation
1	Bengaluru	18	13	1	4	35	16	+19	40	Qualification for ISL play-offs
2	Chennaiyin (Note: Qualified for 2019 AFC Cup qualifying play-offs) (C)	18	9	5	4	24	19	+5	32	Qualification for ISL play-offs
3	Goa	18	9	3	6	42	28	+14	30	Qualification for ISL play-offs
4	Pune City	18	9	3	6	30	21	+9	30	Qualification for ISL play-offs
5	Jamshedpur	18	7	5	6	16	18	−2	26	
6	Kerala Blasters	18	6	7	5	20	22	−2	25	
7	Mumbai City	18	7	2	9	25	29	−4	23	
8	Delhi Dynamos	18	5	4	9	27	37	−10	19	
9	ATK	18	4	4	10	16	30	−14	16	
10	NorthEast United	18	3	2	13	12	27	−15	11	

Source: Indian Super League
Rules for classification: 1) points; 2) head-to-head points; 3) head-to-head goal difference; 4) head-to-head goals scored; 5) goal difference; 5) number of goals scored; 6) fair play ranking; 6) drawing of lots
(C) Champions

== Teams ==
Bengaluru, a new expansion side in the Indian Super League, were the first side to qualify for the playoffs on 9 February 2018. The side managed to qualify after only 15 matches and having gained 33 points. Pune City became the second side to qualify for the playoffs after Jamshedpur, another new expansion side, were defeated by Bengaluru on 26 February. The victory for Bengaluru also ensured that they would finish the season at the top of the table.

Chennaiyin, the 2015 ISL season champions, were the third side to confirm their qualification for the playoffs on 27 February. This was due to Mumbai City suffering defeat to Delhi Dynamos. The last spot in the playoffs was not decided until the last match day of the regular season when Jamshedpur hosted Goa at the Kalinga Stadium. Both Jamshedpur and Goa were the only two sides eligible for that last spot. Goa would go on to win the match 3–0 and thus became the final team to qualify for the playoffs.

== Bracket ==
Semi-finals
1	Bengaluru	0	3	3
4	Pune City	0	1	1
2	Chennaiyin	1	3	4
3	Goa	1	0	1

Final
1	Bengaluru	2
2	Chennaiyin	3

== Semi-finals ==
Team 1	Agg.	Team 2	1st leg	2nd leg
Pune City	1–3	Bengaluru	0–0	1–3
Goa	1–4	Chennaiyin	1–1	0–3

=== Leg 1 ===
7 March 2018
20:00 IST

Pune City	0–0	Bengaluru
	Report

Balewadi Stadium, Pune
Attendance: 9,284
Referee: Om Prakash Thakur

10 March 2018
20:00 IST

Goa	1–1	Chennaiyin
Lanzarote 64'	Report	Thapa 71'

Fatorda Stadium, Margao
Attendance: 18,492
Referee: Santosh Kumar

=== Leg 2 ===
11 March 2018
20:00 IST

Bengaluru	3–1	Pune City
Chhetri 15', 65' (pen.), 89'	Report	Lucca 82'

Sree Kanteerava Stadium, Bangalore
Attendance: 24,214
Referee: Turki Al Khudair

Bengaluru won 3–1 on aggregate

13 March 2018
20:00 IST

Chennaiyin	3–0	Goa
Lalpekhlua 26', 90'; Ganesh 29'	Report

Jawaharlal Nehru Stadium, Chennai
Attendance: 19,013
Referee: Turki Al Khudair

Chennaiyin won 4–1 on aggregate

== Final ==
17 March 2018
20:00 IST

Bengaluru	2–3	Chennaiyin
Chhetri 9'; Miku 90+2'	Report	Alves 17', 45'; Augusto 67'

Sree Kanteerava Stadium, Bangalore
Attendance: 25,753
Referee: Ali Abdulnabi

== Goalscorers ==
4 goals

- (India) Sunil Chhetri (Bengaluru)

2 goals

- (India) Jeje Lalpekhlua (Chennaiyin)
- (Brazil) Maílson Alves (Chennaiyin)

1 goal

- (Spain) Manuel Lanzarote (Goa)
- (India) Anirudh Thapa (Chennaiyin)
- (Brazil) Jonatan Lucca (Pune City)
- (India) Dhanpal Ganesh (Chennaiyin)
- (Brazil) Raphael Augusto (Chennaiyin)
- (Venezuela) Miku (Bengaluru)
