= Rahul Bheke =

Indian footballer (born 1990)

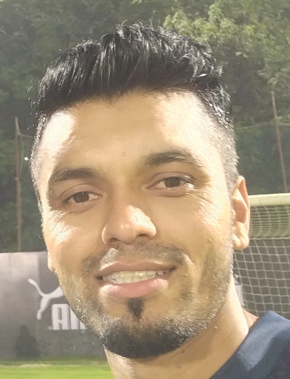
- Bheke with Mumbai City in 2023

Personal information
- Full name: Rahul Shankar Bheke
- Date of birth: 6 December 1990 (age 35)
- Place of birth: Mumbai, India
- Height: 1.80 m (5 ft 11 in)
- Positions: Centre-back; right-back

Team information
- Current team: Mohun Bagan
- Number: 2

Youth career
- Mahindra United

Senior career*
Years	Team	Apps	(Gls)
2011–2013	Air India	23	(0)
2013	Mumbai Tigers	0	(0)
2013–2015	Mumbai	20	(1)
2015–2017	East Bengal	25	(0)
2015	→ Kerala Blasters (loan)	12	(0)
2016	→ Pune City (loan)	10	(0)
2017–2021	Bengaluru	70	(5)
2021–2024	Mumbai City	58	(2)
2024–2026	Bengaluru	37	(3)
2026–	Mohun Bagan	3	(0)

International career^{‡}
2019–	India	50	(3)
Medal record
Men's football
Representing India
SAFF Championship
Winner	2021 Maldives
Winner	2023 India
CAFA Nations Cup
Third place	2025 Tajikistan–Uzbekistan	Team
- * Club domestic league appearances and goals as of 26 October 2026 ‡ National team caps and goals as of 20:00, 9 June 2026 (UTC)

Rahul Shankar Bheke (Marathi: राहुल शंकर भेके; born 6 December 1990) is an Indian professional footballer who plays as a defender for Indian Super League club Mohun Bagan and the India national team.

== Club career ==
=== Early career and Air India ===
Born in Mumbai, Maharashtra, Bheke started to play football for his school teams before joining the under-19 squad of Mahindra United. Bheke then joined his first professional club, Air India, and played for them from 2011 to 2013. After Air India's relegation from the I-League, Bheke joined Mumbai Tigers. He played for them in small cup competitions before leaving the club.

=== Mumbai ===
In January 2014, Bheke returned to the I-League after he signed for Mumbai. He made his debut for the club on 15 January against Mohun Bagan in the Federation Cup. He came on as a substitute for Pappachen Pradeep as Mumbai lost 1–0. He went on to make eight appearances for the club that season and was signed a contract extension which will keep him till next season.

Bheke scored his first professional goal on 7 April 2015 against Bengaluru at the Sree Kanteerava Stadium. His 67th-minute goal put Mumbai in the lead but Robin Singh managed to equalize two minutes before stoppage time to end the game 1–1.

=== East Bengal ===
After two seasons with Mumbai, Bheke signed for fellow I-League side, East Bengal. Bheke played his first debut match on 23 January 2016 against arch-rival Mohun Bagan which finished in a 1–1 draw. He played his last match of the season on 10 April in a 3–1 defeat against Bengaluru FC. Bheke left the club on loan for Kerala Blasters in the 2015 Indian Super League. After two loan stints, Bheke returned to East Bengal for the 2016–17 I-League season. Bheke played his first match of the season on 7 January 2017 in a 1–1 draw against Aizawl FC. Bheke played his last match with East Bengal against his former club Mumbai FC, which they came out winning on a big margin of 0–4.

==== Kerala Blasters (loan) ====
After a good performance for Mumbai during the 2014–15 I-League season, Bheke was one of the available players during the 2015 Indian Super League domestic draft. Unfortunately, Bheke was not chosen in the draft. However, in September 2015, it was revealed that Bheke had joined the Kerala Blasters for their pre-season camp and eventually he signed with the club on loan from East Bengal. Bheke made his debut for the club during their opening fixture against NorthEast United on 6 October 2015. He started and played 90 minutes as Kerala Blasters won 3–1. He played his last match on 18 October in a 0–1 defeat against Delhi Dynamos (present Odisha FC).

==== Pune City (loan) ====
Bheke was loaned to former Indian Super League side FC Pune City from East Bengal after his loan term with Kerala Blasters. He played his first match for the club against ATK on 6 November 2016 which they rose to win 2–1. Bheke lost his first match with Pune on 25 November against his former club Kerala Blasters, which they lost 2–1. He played his last match against ATK in the return leg at road which ended in a 0–0 draw.

=== Bengaluru ===
Bheke was picked by Bengaluru in Round 4 in 2017–18 ISL Players Draft. Bengaluru was one of the two new entries to Indian Super League. Bheke played his first match with Bengaluru in his continental debut in the 2017 AFC Cup against April 25 SC on 23 August 2017, which ended 3–0 to Bengaluru.

Bheke played his first league match of the 2017–18 Indian Super League on 19 November 2017 in their first ever match in ISL against Mumbai City FC, which ended 2–0 to Bengaluru. Bengaluru had a perfect debut campaign, as they qualified for the finals of the 2017–18 Indian Super League with Bheke on team after defeating his former club FC Pune City on an aggregate score of 3–1. Bheke started in the final against Chennaiyin FC but was defeated on a score of 2–3.

Bheke played his first match of the 2018 AFC Cup on 13 February 2018 against T.C. Sports Club, which turned out in a 2–3 victory for Bengaluru. On 22 February 2018, Bengaluru extended his contract for three years which will keep him at the club till 2021.

Bheke played his first match 2018–19 Indian Super League season on 30 September against the defending champions Chennaiyin, which ended 1–0 to Bengaluru. Bengaluru had a standout campaign, as they qualified for the finals yet again in that season against FC Goa. The match went on deadlock for both sides but the victory was sealed for Bengaluru when Bheke scored the deciding goal in the 117th minute to win the first Indian Super League trophy for Bengaluru. Bheke was named man of the match on the final eve for his solitary goal in the 117 minute.

Bheke played his first match of the 2019–20 Indian Super League against NorthEast United FC on 21 October 2019, which ended in a 0–0 draw. He scored his first goal of the season on 22 January 2020 in a 3–0 victory over Odisha. Bengaluru qualified for the knockout stage for the third consecutive time the season with Bheke on side but was defeated by ATK on an aggregate score of 3–2.

Bheke started in his first match of the 2020 AFC Cup qualifying play-offs against Maziya on the second leg of the qualifying round, which Bengaluru won 3–2 but lost on penalties after the after aggregate score of 4–4 led to the shoot-out.

Bheke played his first match of the 2020–21 Indian Super League against FC Goa on 22 November 2020 in a 2–2 draw. He scored his first goal of the season against NorthEast United on 12 January 2021, which ended in a 1–1 draw due to the equalizer scored by Bheke. After the 2020–21 ISL campaign, Bheke left Bengaluru after spending four seasons at the club.

=== Mumbai City ===
On 19 August 2021, Bheke joined Mumbai City on a two-year deal with an option to extend for a further season.

"It's a surreal feeling, to have joined Mumbai City. This is my hometown club and of course, the defending champions. I'm ready to start this new journey with my new family and make memories with our fans."

— Bheke, after signing with Mumbai City.

On 22 November, Bheke made his debut for the club in the Indian Super League against Goa, in a resounding 3–0 win. He scored his first and the winning goal against Chennaiyin, on 15 December in a 1–0 win. On 17 February, he scored his second goal of the season, against Jamshedpur in a 3–2 defeat.

He was later included in the club's 2022 AFC Champions League squad. On 11 April, he scored the winning header from a corner in the 75th minute, in a historic 2–1 win against Al-Quwa Al-Jawiya, as Mumbai City became the first Indian club to win an AFC Champions League game. He in turn became the first Indian player to score in the competition.

=== Return to Benguluru ===
On 7 July 2024, following the expiry of his Mumbai City contract, Bheke rejoined Bengaluru FC on a two-year deal.

=== Mohun Bagan ===
After his departure from Bengaluru, Bheke joined Mohun Bagan on a one-year-contract.

== International career ==
Bheke got his call-up for the senior national team under the head coach Igor Štimac after his excellent performance in the 2018–19 Indian Super League season along with five other rookies. Bheke made his international debut against Curaçao in 2019 King's Cup on 5 June 2019 which turned out to be a 3–1 loss to India.

After the King's Cup, Bheke was called up for the Indian squad to take part in the 2022 FIFA World Cup qualifiers. He played his first of the qualifiers on 5 September 2019 against Oman, which India lost 1–2. He also played in India's match against Qatar on 10 September, where India put on an excellent show, as they drew against the continental champions 0–0. Bheke also appeared in the second qualifying match against Qatar on 3 June 2021, where he was booked twice, resulting in a red card in the early 17th minute of the game. India ended up losing the match 0–1 at full-time.

Bheke scored his first international goal against Bahrain on 23 March 2022 in an eventual 2–1 loss.

== Personal life ==
He married his longtime sweetheart Shraddha Waingankar in 2019.

== Career statistics ==
=== Club ===
As of matches played till 5 November 2026

Club	Season	League			National Cup (Note: Includes Federation Cup, Super Cup)		League Cup (Note: Includes Durand Cup)		Continental		Others		Total	
Club	Season	Division	Apps	Goals	Apps	Goals	Apps	Goals	Apps	Goals	Apps	Goals	Apps	Goals
Air India	2012–13	I-League	23	0	0	0	–		–		–		23	0
Mumbai	2013–14	I-League	6	0	3	0	–		–		–		9	0
Mumbai	2014–15	I-League	14	1	4	0	–		–		–		18	1
Mumbai	Total		20	1	7	0	–		–		0	0	27	1
East Bengal	2015–16	I-League	10	0	–		–		–		5 (Note: Appearances in Calcutta Football League)	3	15	3
East Bengal	2016–17	I-League	15	0	4	0	–		–		6	1	25	1
East Bengal	Total		25	0	4	0	–		–		11	4	40	4
Kerala Blasters (loan)	2015	Indian Super League	12	0	–		–		–		–		12	0
Pune City (loan)	2016	Indian Super League	10	0	–		–		–		–		10	0
Bengaluru	2017–18	Indian Super League	19	0	3	1	–		4 (Note: Appearance(s) in AFC Cup)	1	–		26	2
Bengaluru	2018–19	Indian Super League	20	3	1	0	–		8	3	–		29	6
Bengaluru	2019–20	Indian Super League	16	1	–		–		1	0	–		17	1
Bengaluru	2020–21	Indian Super League	15	1	–		–		1	2	–		16	3
Bengaluru	Total		70	5	4	1	0	0	14	6	0	0	88	12
Mumbai City	2021–22	Indian Super League	18	2	–		–		6 (Note: Appearance(s) in AFC Champions League)	1	–		24	3
Mumbai City	2022–23	Indian Super League	17	0	3	0	2	0	1 (Note: Appearance in playoff for AFC Champions League)	0	–		23	0
Mumbai City	2023–24	Indian Super League	23	0	–		4	0	5	0	–		32	0
Mumbai City	Total		58	2	3	0	6	0	12	1	0	0	79	3
Bengaluru	2024–25	Indian Super League	26	3	–		5	1	–		–		31	4
Bengaluru	2025–26	Indian Super League	11	0	3	0	–		–		–		14	0
Bengaluru	Total		37	3	3	0	5	1	0	0	0	0	45	4
Mohun Bagan	2026–27	Indian Super League	4	0	0	0	5	1	–		9 (Note: 5 Appearance(s) in 2026 Calcutta League and 4 Appearance(s) in 2026 IFA Shield)	0	18	1
Career total			259	11	21	1	16	2	26	7	20	4	342	25

=== International ===
As of 9 June 2026

National team	Year	Apps	Goals
India	2019	10	0
India	2021	8	0
India	2022	1	1
India	2023	5	0
India	2024	11	1
India	2025	10	1
India	2026	5	0
Total		50	3

== International goals ==
As of 19 March 2025
Score and results list India's goal tally first, score column indicates score after Bheke's goal.

Key
‡	Indicates goal was scored from a penalty kick

Goal	Cap	Date	Venue	Opponent	Score	Result	Competition	Ref.
1.	19	23 March 2022	Bahrain National Stadium, Riffa	Bahrain	1–1	1–2	Friendly	
2.	35	18 November 2024	G.M.C Balayogi Athletic Stadium, Hyderabad	Malaysia	1–1	1–1	Friendly	
3.	36	20 March 2025	Jawaharlal Nehru Stadium, Shillong	Maldives	1–0	3–0	Friendly	

== Honours ==
Mohun Bagan

- Calcutta Football League: 2026
- IFA Shield: 2026

East Bengal

- Calcutta Football League: 2016–17

Bengaluru

- Indian Super Cup: 2018
- Indian Super League Cup: 2018–19

Mumbai City

- Indian Super League Shield: 2022–23
- Indian Super League Cup: 2023–24

India

- SAFF Championship: 2021, 2023
- King's Cup third place: 2019
- Tri-Nation Series: 2023
- Intercontinental Cup: 2023
