= 2018 Indian Super League final =

- Event: 2017–18 Indian Super League
Bengaluru	Chennaiyin
(India)	(India)
2	3
- Date: 17 March 2018
- Venue: Sree Kanteerava Stadium, Bangalore, Karnataka
- Man of the Match: Maílson Alves
- Referee: Ali Abdulnabi (Bahrain)
- Attendance: 25,753

The 2018 Indian Super League final was a football match between Bengaluru and Chennaiyin, played on 17 March 2018, at the Sree Kanteerava Stadium in Bangalore. The match was a culmination of the 2017–18 Indian Super League, the fourth season of one of the top professional football leagues in India. Chennaiyin won the match, defeating Bengaluru 3–2. Hero of the Match Maílson Alves scored a brace for Chennaiyin while Raphael Augusto scored their third goal. Bengaluru's Sunil Chhetri originally gave his side the lead with his ninth minute goal while Miku scored their consolation in second half stoppage-time.

Chennaiyin managed to qualify for the finals after finishing in second during the regular season. They then defeated Goa over two legs, 4–1, in the semi-finals. Bengaluru qualified for the finals after finishing at the top of the regular season table. They then defeated Pune City during the semi-finals tie, 3–1. Prior to the finals, Chennaiyin and Bengaluru played each other twice during the season, with both sides winning the away fixtures against each other.

The ISL Cup was Chennaiyin's second, after they won the 2015 final. This was Bengaluru's first time in the final in what was only their first season in the Indian Super League. As the Champions, Chennaiyin earned a berth into the 2019 AFC Cup qualifiers. It was a thriller with one late goal

== Background ==
This was Bengaluru's first season in the Indian Super League and also their first appearance in the finals. Meanwhile Chennaiyin made their second appearance in the Indian Super League finals.

Sunil Chhetri scored the fastest goal in an Indian Super League final in 8 minutes 5 seconds.

Maílson Alves was named the man of the match for scoring two goals.

== Match ==
17 March 2018
20:00 IST

Bengaluru	2–3	Chennaiyin
Chhetri 9'; Miku 90+2'	Report	Alves 17', 45'; Augusto 67'

Sree Kanteerava Stadium, Bangalore
Attendance: 25,753
Referee: Ali Abdulnabi

Bengaluru	Chennaiyin

GK	1	(India) Gurpreet Singh Sandhu
DF	6	(England) John Johnson
DF	16	(Australia) Erik Paartalu		(substituted off) 61'
DF	5	(Spain) Juanan
MF	2	(India) Rahul Bheke
MF	8	(India) Lenny Rodrigues	(yellow card) 78'
MF	14	(Spain) Dimas Delgado		(substituted off) 45'
MF	17	(India) Boithang Haokip		(substituted off) 61'
FW	21	(India) Udanta Singh
FW	11	(India) Sunil Chhetri	(yellow card) 85'
FW	7	(Venezuela) Miku
Substitutes:
GK	28	(India) Lalthuammawia Ralte
DF	22	(India) Nishu Kumar		(substituted on) 61'
MF	20	(India) Alwyn George
MF	19	(Spain) Toni
MF	12	(Spain) Daniel Segovia		(substituted on) 61'
MF	44	(Spain) Víctor Pérez		(substituted on) 45'
MF	4	(India) Zohmingliana Ralte
Head coach:
(Spain) Albert Roca

GK	1	(India) Karanjit Singh
DF	14	(Spain) Iñigo Calderón
DF	27	(Brazil) Maílson Alves
DF	2	(Portugal) Henrique Sereno
DF	18	(India) Jerry Lalrinzuala
MF	17	(India) Dhanpal Ganesh
MF	6	(India) Bikramjit Singh		(substituted off) 62'
MF	30	(India) Francis Fernandes		(substituted off) 90'
MF	7	(Netherlands) Gregory Nelson	(yellow card) 22'
MF	19	(Brazil) Raphael Augusto		(substituted off) 88'
FW	12	(India) Jeje Lalpekhlua
Substitutes:
GK	13	(India) Pawan Kumar
MF	15	(India) Anirudh Thapa		(substituted on) 62'
MF	8	(Spain) Jaime Gavilán		(substituted on) 88'
MF	10	(Slovenia) Rene Mihelič
MF	11	(India) Thoi Singh		(substituted on) 90'
FW	9	(Nigeria) Jude Nworuh
FW	20	(India) Mohammed Rafi
Head coach:
(England) John Gregory

Man of the Match:
Maílson Alves (Chennaiyin)

Match rules

- 90 minutes.
- 30 minutes of extra time if necessary.
- Penalty shoot-out if scores still level.
