= Joyner Lourenco =

Indian footballer

Personal information
- Full name: Joyner Monte Lourenco
- Date of birth: 8 September 1991 (age 35)
- Place of birth: Goa, India
- Height: 1.78 m (5 ft 10 in)
- Position: Centre-back

Senior career*
Years	Team	Apps	(Gls)
2008–2010	Goa Velha		
2010–2017	Sporting Goa	40	(1)
2017–2018	Bengaluru		
2018–2019	Mumbai City	10	(0)
2019–2021	Jamshedpur	15	(0)
2021–2022	East Bengal	11	(0)
2023	Real Kashmir		

International career
2014	India U23	2	(0)
- * Club domestic league appearances and goals

Joyner Monte Lourenco (born 8 September 1991) is an Indian professional footballer who plays as a defender.

== Club career ==
Born in Goa, Lourenco began his career with Goa Velha, a local club in the state. In 2010, Lourenco joined professional I-League side Sporting Goa. He made his debut for the club on 28 October 2011 in a league match against Pune. He came on as a substitute for Boboi Singh as Sporting Goa drew the match 2–2.

=== Bengaluru ===
On 23 July 2017, Lourenco was selected in the 14th round of the 2017–18 ISL Players Draft by Bengaluru for the 2017–18 Indian Super League. He made his debut for bengaluru fc in their 2018 AFC Cup preliminary round match against Transport United.He came as 75th-minute substitute for Prashanth Kalinga. He made a total of 5 appearances for the club in 2018 AFC Cup. On 8 June 2018 Bengaluru fc released Joyner along with 4 other players.

=== Mumbai City FC ===
In October 2018 he joined Mumbai City FC. on 27 October 2018 he made his ISL debut as he played a full 90 minutes for the club against Delhi Dynamos FC.

== International ==
On 9 September 2014, Lourenco was selected in the 20 man India U23 side for the 2014 Asian Games. He proceeded to make his debut for the side on 15 September 2014 against the United Arab Emirates. He started the match but couldn't prevent India from losing 5–0.

== Career statistics ==
=== Club ===
As of 28 February 2022

Club	Season	League			Cup		AFC		Total	
Club	Season	Division	Apps	Goals	Apps	Goals	Apps	Goals	Apps	Goals
Sporting Goa	2011–12	I-League	10	1	0	0	—		10	1
Sporting Goa	2012–13	I-League	15	0	0	0	—		15	0
Sporting Goa	2013–14	I-League	8	0	5 (Note: Appearance(s) in Federation Cup)	0	—		13	0
Sporting Goa	2014–15	I-League	7	0	4	0	—		11	0
Sporting Goa	2015–16	I-League	0	0	0	0	—		0	0
Sporting Goa	Sporting Goa total		40	1	9	0	0	0	49	1
Bengaluru	2017–18	Indian Super League	0	0	0	0	5 (Note: Appearance(s) in AFC Cup)	0	5	0
Mumbai City	2018–19	Indian Super League	10	0	1 (Note: Appearance(s) in Super Cup)	0	—		11	0
Jamshedpur	2019–20	Indian Super League	10	0	0	0	—		10	0
Jamshedpur	2020–21	Indian Super League	5	0	0	0	—		5	0
East Bengal	2021–22	Indian Super League	11	0	0	0	—		11	0
Career total			76	1	10	0	5	0	91	1

== Personal life ==
He married Montia De Souza on January 14, 2020
