= Andrew Carlton =

American singer-songwriter

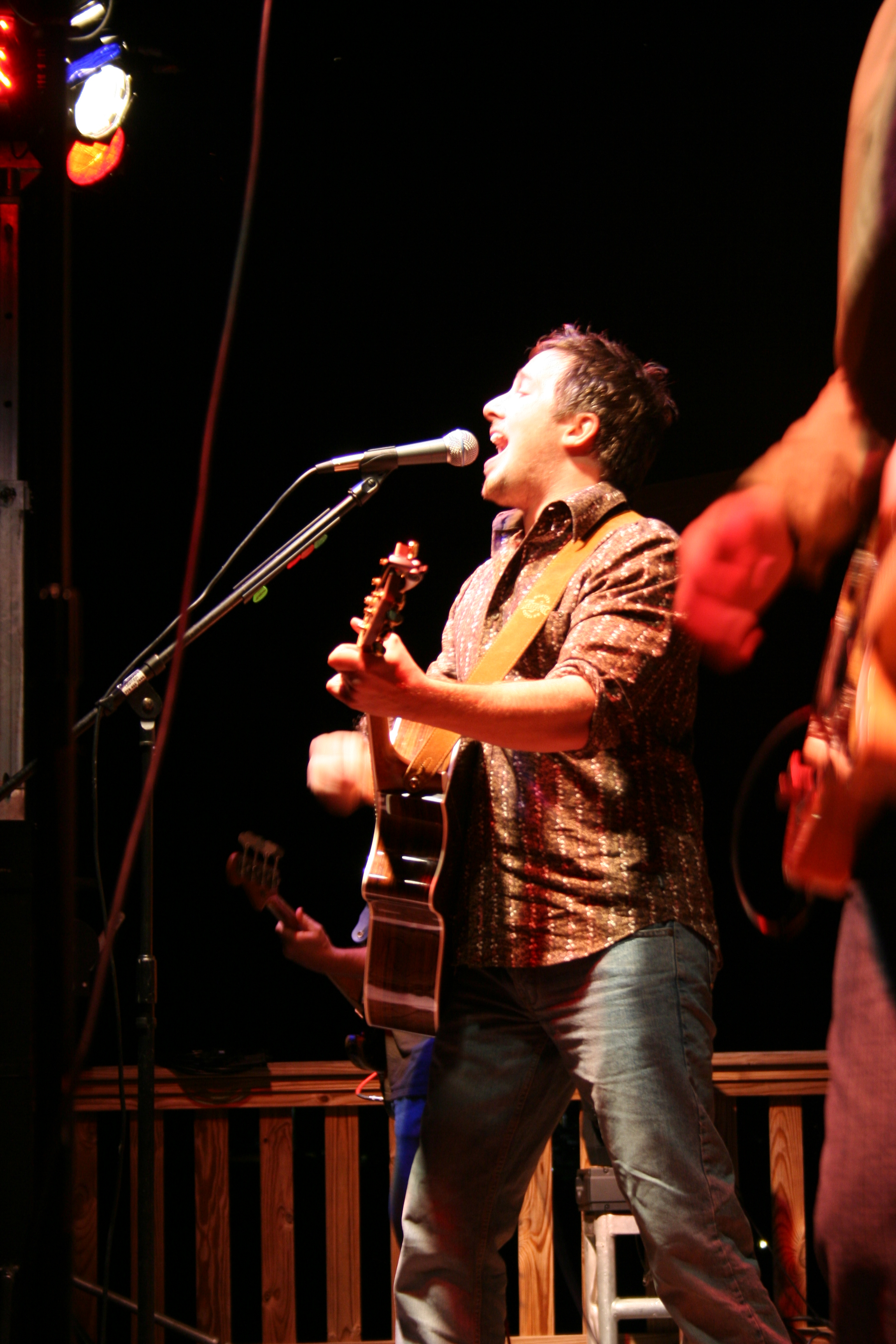
- Andrew Carlton performing at Rock Ranch in The Rock, Georgia.

Background information
- Born: April 4, 1977 (age 48); Phoenix, Arizona, U.S.
- Genres: CCM, Country
- Years active: 1999 – Present
- Website: www.andrewcarlton.com

Andrew Carlton is an American singer, songwriter and music producer. He is a graduate of the University of Tennessee, where he was the costumed mascot, Smokey. His single "Jesus, Hold Me" spent 13 weeks on Billboard's Adult Contemporary chart before hitting No. 18 and becoming the highest-charting single by an Independent Artist in 2007. He is most known for his hit radio single "Hold Me Up".

Carlton has toured with other artists Rebecca St James, Aaron Shust, and Newsong.

== Discography ==
- 2007 I Know Better (Bakertown)
- 2004 Falling In (Flying Leap)
- 1999 Hold Me Up (Audio X)
