= Boithang Haokip =

Indian footballer

Personal information
- Date of birth: 9 September 1991 (age 35)
- Place of birth: Kangpokpi, Manipur, India
- Height: 1.70 m (5 ft 7 in)
- Position: Central midfielder

Team information
- Current team: East Bengal
- Number: 9

Youth career
- 2008–2011: Shillong Lajong

Senior career*
Years	Team	Apps	(Gls)
2009–2016	Shillong Lajong	89	(18)
2014–2016	→ NorthEast United (loan)	13	(1)
2016–17	Mumbai City	3	(0)
2017–2019	Bengaluru	21	(2)
2019–	East Bengal	2	(1)
- * Club domestic league appearances and goals as of 16:16, 17 March 2019 (UTC)

Boithang Haokip (born 9 September 1991) is an Indian footballer who currently plays for SC East Bengal in the Indian Super League. A free-kick specialist, he primarily plays as a central midfielder but can play as a full-back or a wide player.

== Career ==
=== Shillong Lajong ===
Boithang started his career at Shillong Lajong's academy and made his senior professional debut during the 2009-10 I-League season, scoring twice, while at the same time, actively playing for Lajong's youth team. With his team relegated at the end of the season, Boithang continued with the youth team while participating in the 2011 I-League 2nd Division. Lajong finished the final round at the top of the table and hence gaining promotion to the 2011-12 I-League.

Boithang's season got off to a good start as he scored for Lajong in the 2011 Federation Cup against Churchill Brothers in the 70th minute on 17 September 2011. He would score his first goal of the 2011–12 season against Chirag United Kerala on 24 March 2012 in a 3–2 loss for his team.

Boithang established himself as a first team regular at Lajong during the 2012-13 I-League season, appearing 22 times and scoring 4 goals. He started the 2013–14 season in the 2013-14 Federation Cup and would score against Mumbai in a 4–0 win for his team. He continued his consistent form during the 2013-14 I-League, appearing 23 times and scoring 5 goals. On 29 April 2014, after the 2013-14 season, Haokip was voted the "Fan's Player of the Season" during the FPAI Indian Football Awards.

Boithang represented NorthEast United FC during the 2014 Indian Super League.

=== Bengaluru FC ===
Haokip was picked by Bengaluru FC on 23 July 2017 in ISL draft.

== Career statistics ==
=== Club ===
As of 3 June 2016

Club	Season	League			Federation Cup		Durand Cup		AFC		Total	
Club	Season	Division	Apps	Goals	Apps	Goals	Apps	Goals	Apps	Goals	Apps	Goals
Shillong Lajong	2009	I-League 2nd Division	1	0	0	0	0	0	—	—	1	0
Shillong Lajong	2009–10	I-League	5	2	0	0	0	0	—	—	5	2
Shillong Lajong	2011	I-League 2nd Division	2	3	0	0	0	0	—	—	2	3
Shillong Lajong	2011–12	I-League	6	1	1	1	0	0	—	—	7	2
Shillong Lajong	2012–13	I-League	22	4	0	0	—	—	—	—	22	4
Shillong Lajong	2013–14	I-League	23	5	2	1	—	—	—	—	25	6
Shillong Lajong	2014–15	I-League	17	2	4	0	—	—	—	—	21	2
Shillong Lajong	2015–16	I-League	13	1	4	0	—	—	—	—	17	1
NorthEast United (loan)	2014	Indian Super League	7	0	—	—	—	—	—	—	7	0
NorthEast United (loan)	2015	Indian Super League	5	1	—	—	—	—	—	—	5	1
Bengaluru FC	2017–18	Indian Super League	10	1	3	0	—	—	5	0	18	1
Bengaluru FC	2018–19	Indian Super League	11	1	1	0	—	—	—	—	12	1
East Bengal FC	2019–20	I-League	0	0	0	0	4	1	—	—	8	1
Career total			122	21	15	2	4	1	5	0	150	24

== Honours ==
Shillong Lajong

- NE Super Series Championship: 2012

Bengaluru

- Indian Super League: 2018–19

Individual

- I-League Fans player of the year: 2013–14
