= Maílson Alves =

Brazilian footballer (born 1988)

Maílson
Personal information
- Full name: Maílson Alves Barreiro Veriato
- Date of birth: 5 February 1988 (age 38)
- Place of birth: Brazil
- Height: 1.90 m (6 ft 3 in)
- Position: Defender

Team information
- Current team: Thrissur Magic

Senior career*
Years	Team	Apps	(Gls)
2009–2010	Portimonense	2	(0)
2011–2012	Porto Alegre	11	(0)
2012–2014	Tombense	11	(0)
2013	→ Vila Nova (loan)	2	(0)
2015	Chennaiyin	12	(0)
2015	Tupi	14	(1)
2016	Volta Redonda	0	(0)
2016	NorthEast United	9	(0)
2017	Volta Redonda	24	(1)
2017–2019	Chennaiyin FC	43	(8)
2019–2020	Dhaka Abahani	6	(0)
2020	Caxias do Sul	4	(0)
2021	Uberlândia Esporte Clube	1	(0)
2021–2022	Floresta Esporte Clube	11	(0)
2024–	Thrissur Magic		
- * Club domestic league appearances and goals

Maílson Alves Barreiro Veriato (born 5 February 1988), commonly known as Maílson Alves or simply as Maílson, is a Brazilian professional footballer who plays as a defender for the Super League Kerala club Thrissur Magic.

== Career ==
=== Brazil ===
Alves started his career in Portugal with Portimonense in the Segunda Liga. He made his debut for the club on 28 October 2009 in a Taça de Portugal against Beira-Mar. He started the match but got sent off in the 85th minute as the match ended in a 0–0 draw. He soon went back to Brazil where he joined Porto Alegre and played for them in the Campeonato Gaúcho. He made his debut for them on 16 January 2011 against Novo Hamburgo. He started the match and played 68 minutes as Porto Alegre lost 1–0. After two years with Porto Alegre, Mailson signed for Tombense but was loaned to Vila Nova of the Série D for the 2013 season. He made his debut for Nova on 28 July 2013 against Marcílio Dias. He started the match as Vila Nova drew it 0–0. He eventually returned to Tombense and made his debut for them on 1 February 2014 against América. Mailson moved clubs again in 2015 when he signed for Tupi. Mailson played for the club in both the Série C and Campeonato Mineiro.

=== Chennaiyin ===
After finishing his contract with Tupi, Mailson decided to go abroad again and signed for the Indian Super League side Chennaiyin.

On 17 March 2018, Alves scored two goals to help Chennaiyin defeat Bengaluru 2–3 in the 2017–18 Indian Super League finals, he was also named the man of the match. Under his captaincy Chennaiyin FC were runner-ups of 2019 Indian Super Cup and Chennaiyin FC, for the first time reached the 2019 AFC Cup qualifying play-offs and finally the group stage of 2019 AFC Cup. He also scored a goal Manang Marshyangdi Club of Nepal on April 4 in the 53rd minute.

=== Abahani Limited Dhaka ===
Mailson joined Bangladesh Premier League side Dhaka Abahani in October 2019. He made his debut against Bangladesh Police FC in a Federation Cup match. On February 5, 2020, he scored first goal for the club in a 2–2 draw against Maldivian side Maziya in an AFC Cup qualifying play-off match.

== Career statistics ==
As of 14 August 2015

Club	Season	League			League Cup		Domestic Cup		International		Total	
Club	Season	Division	Apps	Goals	Apps	Goals	Apps	Goals	Apps	Goals	Apps	Goals
Portimonense	2009–10	Segunda Liga	2	0	—	—	2	0	—	—	4	0
Porto Alegre	2011	Campeonato Gaúcho	11	0	—	—	0	0	—	—	11	0
Tombense	2013	Campeonato Mineiro	0	0	—	—	0	0	—	—	0	0
Tombense	2014	Campeonato Mineiro	11	0	—	—	2	0	—	—	13	0
Vila Nova (loan)	2013	Série D	2	0	—	—	0	0	—	—	2	0
Tupi	2015	Série C	5	0	9	1	2	0	—	—	16	1
Chennaiyin	2014	Indian Super League	12	0	—	—	—	—	—	—	0	0
Volta Redonda	2016	Campeonato Brasileiro Série D	0	0	—	—	—	—	—	—	0	0
NorthEast United	2016	Indian Super League	9	0	—	—	—	—	—	—	0	0
Career total			32	0	9	1	6	0	0	0	46	1

== Honours ==
=== Club ===
Chennaiyin FC

- Indian Super League: 2015, 2017–18
