= Sree Kanteerava Stadium =

Sports stadium in Bengaluru, India

Sree Kanteerava Outdoor Stadium
- Śrē Kaṅṭhērava Krīḍaṅgaṇa
- Sampangi Outdoor Stadium
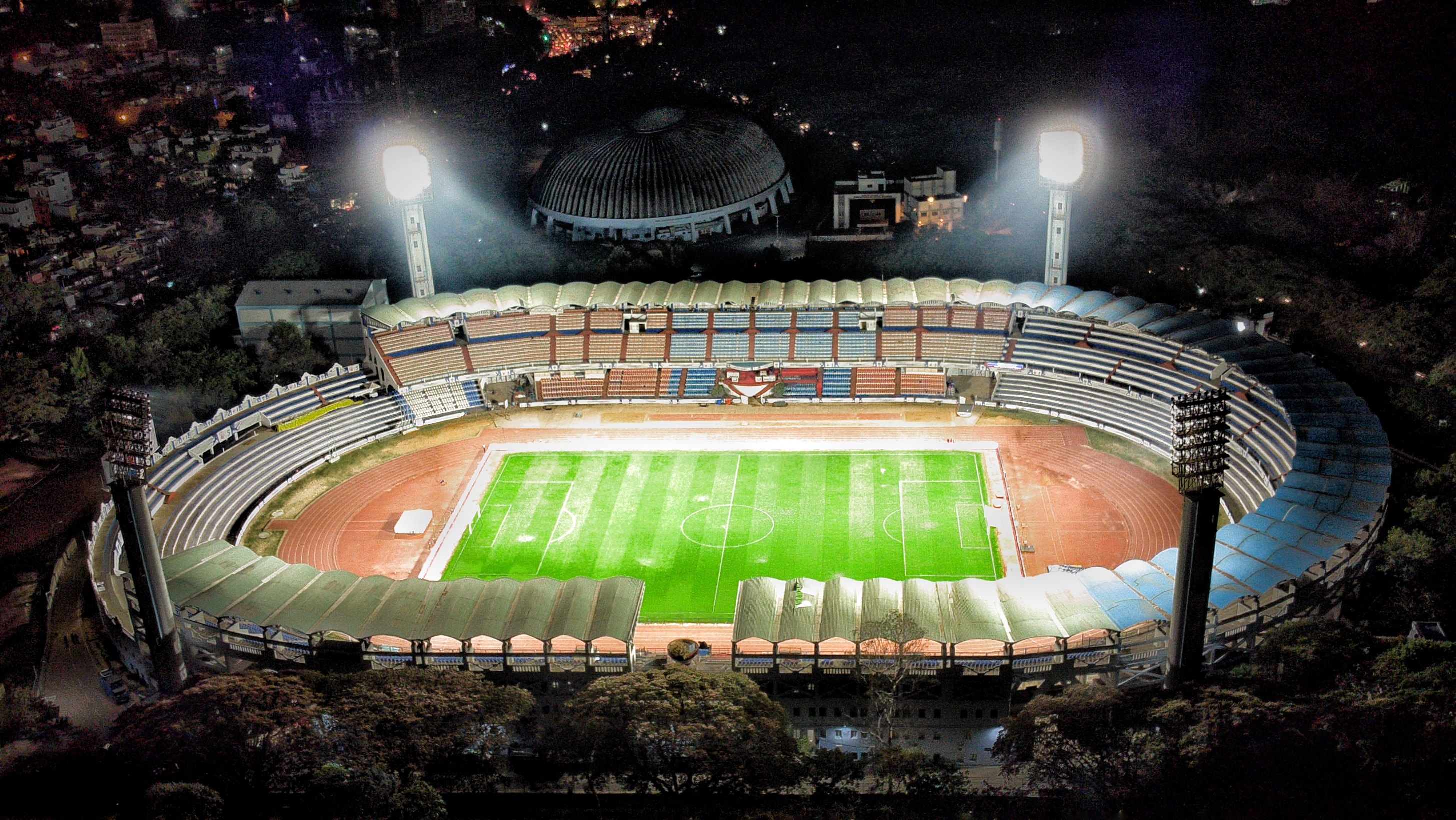
- Interactive map of Sree Kanteerava Outdoor Stadium
- Full name: Shree Kanteerava Outdoor Stadium
- Former names: Sampangi Stadium
- Location: Bengaluru, India
- Coordinates: 12°58′11″N 77°35′36″E
- Owner: Department of Youth Empowerment and Sports, Government of Karnataka
- Operator: Department of Youth Empowerment and Sports, Government of Karnataka
- Capacity: 25,810
- Public transit: Purple Line Cubbon Park

Construction
- Built: 1946 (80 years ago)
- Opened: 31 May 1997
- General contractor: SVEC Constructions Ltd.

Tenant
- Bengaluru FC (2014–present)

Sree Kanteerava Outdoor Stadium, also known as Sampangi Outdoor Stadium, is a multi-purpose stadium in Bengaluru, India. It houses a running track, a volleyball court, and two outdoor rock climbing walls. The stadium is owned by the Department of Youth Empowerment and Sports, Government of Karnataka. It is the largest sports complex in Bengaluru.

Renamed after Yuvaraja Kanteerava Narasimharaja Wadiyar, the stadium, constructed on the bed of the Sampangi Lake, was inaugurated in 1946 by his son Maharaja Jayachamaraja Wadiyar. Then housing a cinder track, a synthetic running track was laid in the 1990s leading up to the 1997 National Games of India for ₹220 million, and was completed by 31 May 1997.

== Stadium ==
The stadium was established in 1946 and was named Sampangi Stadium. It was built on the bed of Sampangi Lake which was perceived as an environmental hazard and was drained in 1937 after it was neglected following supply of piped water from the Hesaraghatta Lake within Bangalore. The stadium had a six-lane cinder track then, before the present synthetic track was laid. Sprinter Milkha Singh trained here in 1952. The stadium hosted the touring Soviet Union national team in an exhibition game against the Mysore State XI in February 1955. The Soviets won 7–1. Other sporting events held in the stadium include the final of the 1962 edition of the Santosh Trophy which the home Mysore team (now Karnataka team) won, and the 1996 edition of the National Games.

On 25 September 2026, Sree Kanteerva Stadium will host India's first ever match against Panama. India secured a hard fought 1-1 draw, Ryan Williams become the first Indian player to score against Panama.

=== Central arena ===
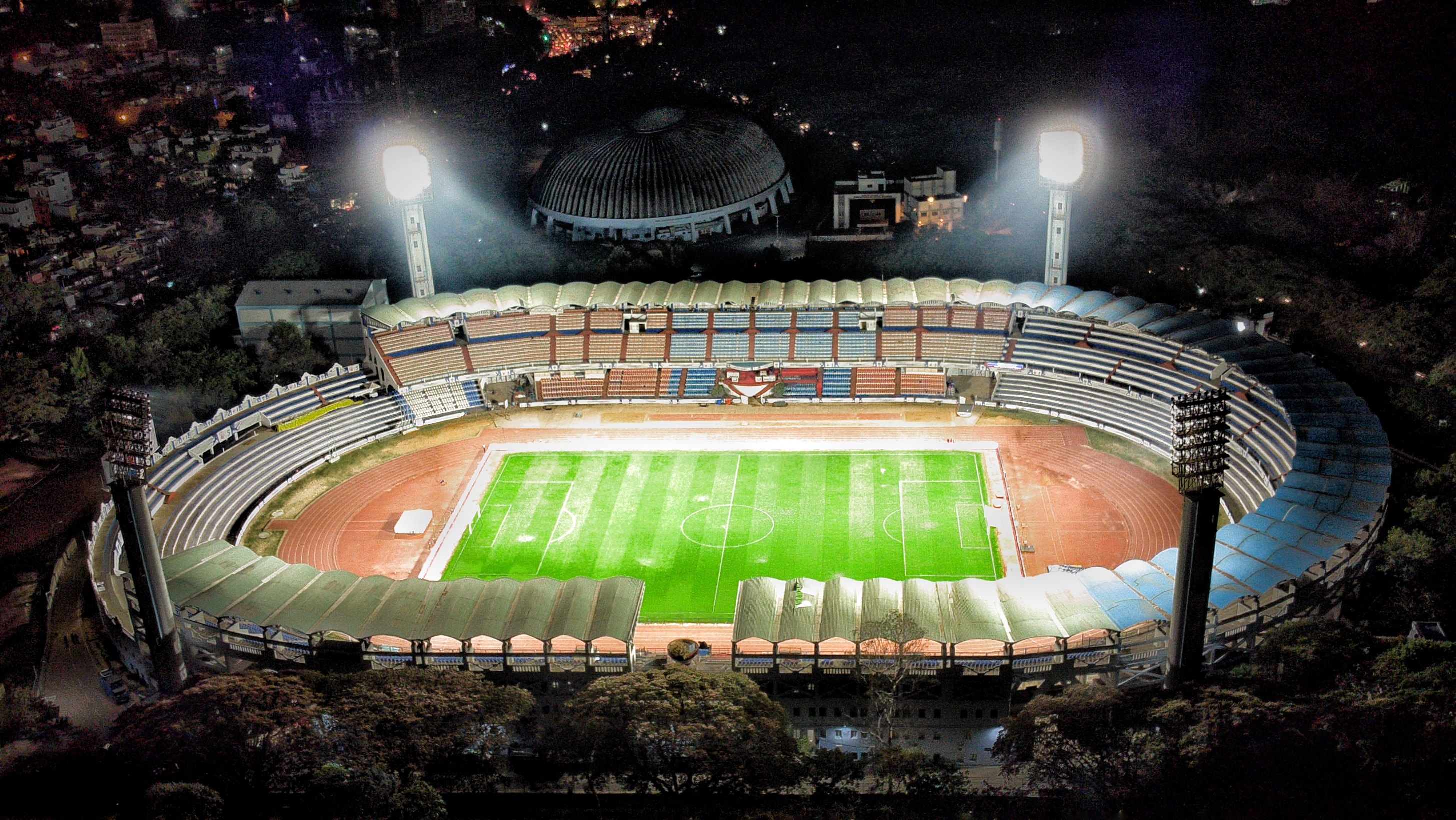
A view of the stadium

The central arena of the stadium consists of an eight-lane 400-metre synthetic athletic track, along with synthetic surfaced areas for field events like Shotput, Discuss, Javelin, Hammer throws, long jump, high jump, triple jump and pole vault. In addition to sporting events, the stadium also hosts walkathon, filmmaking, rallies and exhibition.

The stadium contains four large arched entrances leading on to the inner field and lower spectator stands. The stadium has eight ramps taking spectators to the upper stands. Thus in total, 12 gates for spectators serve the stadium.

== Average attendances ==
Tenants	League season	Home games	Average attendance
Bengaluru FC	2023-24	11	8,059
Bengaluru FC	2022-23	10	11,371

== See also ==
- Kanteerava Indoor Stadium
- List of stadiums in India
