= List of football clubs in West Bengal =

This is a list of football clubs based in the Indian State of West Bengal that compete in the various divisions of Indian and West Bengali football.

== List of clubs by leagues ==
=== National Leagues (ISL, IL, IL-2, IL-3) ===
The table below lists all West Bengal clubs in the top eight tiers of the Indian football league system: from the top division (the Indian Super League), down to Tier-4 of Indian football. League status is correct for the 2024–25 season. These clubs also participate in the state league, i.e., Calcutta Premier Division.

Club	Founded	Stadium	Capacity	Notes
Indian Super League (1)
Mohun Bagan Super Giant	1889	Salt Lake Stadium	68,000	One of the oldest football clubs of India. Club with most trophies won (263).
East Bengal	1920	Salt Lake Stadium	68,000	East Bengal is the only Indian club to win an international trophy.
Mohammedan	1891	Kishore Bharati Krinangan	12,000	One of the Big Three in Kolkata.
I-League (2)
Diamond Harbour	2020	Naihati Stadium	25,000	
I-League 2 (3)
United	1927	Kalyani Stadium	20,000	
I-League 3 (4)
Bhawanipore	1910	Rabindra Sarobar	22,000	
Calcutta Customs	1892			

=== Calcutta Premier Division ===
As of 2022:

- Aryan
- BSS
- Eastern Railway
- Food Corporation of India (East Zone)
- George Telegraph
- Kalighat Milan Sangha
- Kidderpore
- Pathachakra
- Peerless
- Police AC
- Railways FC
- Rainbow
- Southern Samity
- Tollygunge Agragami
- United
- West Bengal Police

=== CFL 1st Division ===
As of 2022:

- Aikya Sammilani
- Anushilani Club
- Barisha SC
- Bengal Nagpur Railway
- Calcutta FC
- Calcutta Police Club
- Calcutta Port Trust
- Chandney SC
- Dalhousie
- Howrah Union
- Measurers Club
- Milan Bithee
- Mouri SC
- MD AC
- Salkia Friends
- SAI (EZ)
- Sreebhumi FC
- SAIL
- Suburban Club
- Taltala Ekata Sangha
- City AC
- United Students
- Wari
- Youngs Corner

=== CFL 2nd Division ===
As of 2022:

- Coal India FC
- Jorabagan Club
- Kalighat Sports Lovers Association
- New Alipore Suruchi Sangha
- North Entally UTS
- Rajasthan Club
- Ramkrishna SC
- Taltala Institute
- The Muslim Institute
- Town Club
- Janbazar AC
- Uttarpally MS
- Young Bengal SA

=== CFL 3rd Division ===
As of 2022:

- Adamas United Sports Academy
- Albert SC
- Alipore SC
- Bally Protiva Club
- Batore SC
- Behala Youth Association
- Calcutta Gymkhana
- Cossipore Saraswati Club
- Garalgacha SC
- Greer SC
- Howrah Maniktala SA
- Kalighat Club
- Kumartuli Institute
- M. Milan Samity
- Sonali Shibir AC
- Southern AC
- Tangra FC
- Victoria SC
- West Bengal United Club
- Y.M.S.A

=== CFL 4th Division ===
As of 2022:

- Bata SC
- Behala ASA
- Beleghata AC
- Burnpur United Club
- Central Calcutta SC
- Chaitaly Sangha
- Dakshin Kalikata Sansad
- Elysium Club
- International Club
- Jadavpur Agragami
- JEFA Jadavpur Association
- Kalighat FDS Club
- Kasba Central Club
- Moitri Sangha
- Paikpara SC
- Shyamnagar United Club
- Sinthee Rasbehari ABM
- Sporting Union
- Uttarpara SC
- White Border Club
- YMCA (Coll)

=== CFL 5th Division ===
As of 2022:

- Armenian SC
- Arunoday Club
- Aurora AA
- Ballygunge Institute
- Bani Niketan SC
- Bagmari Club
- Beleghata BB
- Beleghata Friends Union
- Bengal SC
- Beniatola Club
- Beniapukur Institute
- Buddhist Club
- Calcutta AC
- Calcutta Parsee Club
- Calcutta Rangers Club
- Calcutta United Club
- COGS
- Darjeepara MS
- Evergreen Club
- Excelsiors Club
- Federation Club
- Garden Reach AC
- Garden Reach MS
- Goan Association of Bengal
- Hastings FC
- Howrah Town Club
- Hrishikesh Park Institute
- India Club
- IB AC
- Jugasanti SC
- Kalighat Milani Club
- Karbala SC
- Kolkata Union SC
- Marcus SC
- Mei-Kong Ex Std
- Milan Chakra
- Mirzapur Union
- Mitra Sammilani
- National AC
- National SC
- N. Sir Gurudas Institute
- Nivedita Club
- Old Friends Union
- P. Utkal Club
- Punjab SC
- Rakhi Sangha
- RHAC
- Sarat Samity
- Saroda Charan AC
- Shibpur Institute
- Baranagar Shibsankar SC
- Shyambazar Club
- South Folk Club
- Star SC
- Subhasdwip SC
- Tapan Memorial Club
- Tara Friends Club
- The Orient Club
- West Bengal Association of the Deaf
- YMCA (Chow)
- YMCA (Well)

== List of clubs by name ==
=== A ===
- Atletico Dé Dumdum Football Club
- Adamas United Sports Academy
- Albert SC
- Alipore SC
- Aikya Sammilani
- Army Red
- Aryan FC
- Asansol FC

=== B ===
- Bata SC
- Batore
- Bali Protibha
- Bally Gramanchal Krira Samity
- Behala Youth
- Belghoria AC
- Bengal Nagpur Railway FC
- Bhratri Sangha FC
- Bhawanipore FC
- Bidhannagar
- BSS Sporting Club
- Burnpur United Limited
- Baranagar Shibsankar Sporting Club
- Burnpur SG

=== C ===
- Calcutta Customs
- Calcutta FC
- Calcutta Gymkhana
- Calcutta Police
- Calcutta Port Trust
- Chandney FC
- City AC
- Coal India
- Cossipore Saraswati Club

=== D ===
- Dalhousie AC
- Diamond Harbour FC
- Disherghar Sporting

=== E ===
- East Bengal FC
- Eastern Railway FC
- Entally Athletic Club

=== F ===
- Food Corporation of India FC

=== G ===
- George Telegraph SC
- Garalgacha
- Green Park SC

=== H ===
- Howrah Union

=== I ===
- Indian Air Force

=== J ===
- Jyotirmoy Athletic Club
- Jonaki United Students Club

=== K ===
- Kalighat Milan Sangha FC
- Kalighat Sports Lovers Association
- Kalighat Freiends
- Kalighat Miloni
- Kidderpore SC
- Kumartuli Institute

=== M ===
- Mohammedan Sporting
- Mohammedan A.C.
- Mohun Bagan Super Giant
- Measurers Club
- Manhoharpur Milan Samity
- Milanbithi
- Mouri Sporting
- Muslim Institute

=== N ===
- New Alipore Suruchi Sangha

=== P ===
- Peerless SC
- Pathachakra FC
- Police AC

=== R ===
- Railway FC
- Rainbow AC
- Rajasthan Club
- Ramkrishna

=== S ===
- Sail
- Salkia Friends Association
- Sovabazar FC
- Sonali Sibir AC
- Southern Samity
- Sporting Union
- Sreebhumi FC
- Subarban

=== T ===
- Taltala Institute
- Taltala Ekota Sangha
- Tangra FC
- Tollygunge Agragami FC
- Town Club
- TT United Football Club

=== U ===
- United SC
- Uttarpally FC
- United Kolkata SC

=== V ===
- Victoria SC

=== W ===
- Wari AC
- West Bengal Police FC

=== Y ===
- Young Bengal
- Youngs Corner

== See also ==
- IFA Shield

== Note ==
- Clubs playing in higher divisions are not included in the lower divisions
