= 2022 CFL Premier Division =

124th edition of Calcutta Premier Division

CFL Premier Division
- Season: 2022
- Champions: Mohammedan (Division A) (13th title); Kalighat MS (Division B)
- Matches: 121
- Goals: 300 (2.48 per match)

The 2022 Calcutta Football League Premier Division was the 124th overall season of the two highest state-level football divisions of West Bengal. The division consists of two tiers within it: Premier Division A and Premier Division B.

== Premier Division A ==
CFL Premier Division A
- Season: 2022
- Dates: 2 August – 1 November
- Champions: Mohammedan (13th title)
- Relegated: Tollygunge Agragami; Southern Samity
- Matches: 65
- Goals: 176 (2.71 per match)
- Top goalscorer: Naro Hari Shrestha (9 goals)
- Biggest win: United 5–1 Peerless; Bhawanipore 6-2 George Telegraph
- Highest scoring: United 5–3 Tollygunge Agragami; Bhawanipore 6-2 George Telegraph
- Longest winning run: United; Kidderpore (5 games)
- Longest unbeaten run: Kidderpore (9 games)
- Longest winless run: Tollygunge Agragami (10 games)
- Longest losing run: Tollygunge Agragami (4 games)

The first stage of the Premier Division A has been held from 2 August till September.Mohammedan are the defending champions of Premier Division A.

=== Change in format ===
The round-robin format had been reinstated after a short season of round-robin cum knock-out format last year due to COVID-19 pandemic, but the league has been divided into two stages so as to accommodate the Kolkata's Big Three–ATK Mohun Bagan, East Bengal and Mohammedan–according to national and continental games schedule. The first stage is played by eleven teams, out of which the top three in the points table would qualify for the Super Six, wherein the three teams would be joined by the Big Three and the top team in the table at the end of the stage would be declared as the CFL Premier Division A champion.

=== Available venues ===
- Amal Datta Krirangan, Dum Dum
- Bankimanjali Stadium, Naihati
- Canning Stadium, Canning
- East Bengal-Aryan Ground, Kolkata
- Kalyani Stadium, Kalyani
- Kakinara Narayanpur Ground, Bhatpara
- Kishore Bharati Krirangan, Kolkata
- Netaji Sports Complex, Rajpur Sonarpur
- Rabindra Sarobar Stadium, Kolkata
- Royal Park Stadium, Barrackpore
- Sailen Manna Stadium, Howrah
- Vivekananda Stadium, Khardah

=== Teams ===
Team	Head coach
Aryan	(India) Rajdeep Nandy
Bhawanipore	(India) Sankarlal Chakraborty
BSS	(India) Hemanta Dora
Calcutta Customs	(India) Biswajit Bhattacharya
East Bengal	(India) Bino George
George Telegraph	(India) Ranjan Bhattacharjee
Kidderpore	(India) Sanjib Pal
Mohammedan	(Russia) Andrey Chernyshov
Tollygunge Agragami	(India) Bimal Ghosh
Peerless	(India) Soren Dutta
Railway	(India) Archisman Biswas
Southern Samity	(India) Saheed Ramon
United	(Belgium) Steven Herbots

=== Foreign players ===
Club	Player 1	Player 2	Player 3	Player 4
Aryan	(Cameroon) Marouane Kemgang	(Cameroon) Aristide Vaillant	(Cameroon) Rayden Ewane	
Bhawanipore	(Trinidad and Tobago) Willis Plaza	(Ivory Coast) Gnohere Krizo	(Nigeria) Echezona Anyichie	
BSS	(Ghana) Kwesi Sesey	(Ghana) Michael Sefah		
Calcutta Customs	(Cameroon) Zacharie Mbenda	(Ghana) Edmond Peprah	(Ghana) Richmond Olushola Awaitey	
East Bengal				
George Telegraph	(Argentina) Matías Verón	(Mali) Abdoulaye Kanouté	(Liberia) Varney Kallon	
Kidderpore	(Ivory Coast) Adama Coulibaly	(Sierra Leone) Dixon Alusine		
Mohammedan	(Trinidad and Tobago) Marcus Joseph	(Nigeria) Abiola Dauda	(Cameroon) Ousmane N'Diaye	(Tajikistan) Nuriddin Davronov
Peerless	(Nigeria) Henry Ezeh	(Ghana) Ben Quansah		
Railway	(Ghana) Shadrach Lantei-Mills	(Liberia) Eddie Wulue		
Southern Samity	(Brazil) Douglas Santana	(Uganda) Habib Kavuma	(Uganda) Hamdan Nsubuga	
Tollygunge Agragami	(Liberia) Ansumana Kromah	(Nigeria) Christopher Chizoba		
United	(Zimbabwe) Davis Kamanga	(Senegal) Selia Toure	(Senegal) Samuel Toure	

== First stage ==
=== Standings ===
Pos	Team	Pld	W	D	L	GF	GA	GD	Pts	Qualification
1	Bhawanipore (Q)	10	7	2	1	18	7	+11	23	Qualification for Super Six
2	Aryan (Q)	10	5	3	2	15	11	+4	18	Qualification for Super Six
3	Kidderpore (Q)	10	5	3	2	12	8	+4	18	Qualification for Super Six
4	Railway	10	5	3	2	14	11	+3	18	
5	United	10	5	2	3	18	11	+7	17	
6	Calcutta Customs	10	4	4	2	19	15	+4	16	
7	BSS	10	4	3	3	14	9	+5	15	
8	George Telegraph	10	2	2	6	12	18	−6	8	
9	Peerless	10	1	4	5	11	20	−9	7	
10	Tollygunge Agragami (R)	10	0	3	7	10	24	−14	3	Relegation to Premier Division B
11	Southern Samity (Note: Southern Samity were deducted 6 points and also handed two losses which includes their forfeited match against United.) (R)	10	2	1	7	8	17	−9	1	Relegation to Premier Division B

Updated to match(es) played on 16 September 2022. Source: Soccerway
Rules for classification: 1) points; 2) goal difference; 3) goals scored; 4) head to head points; 5) fair play ranking; 6) drawing of lots
(Q) Qualified for the phase indicated; (R) Relegated

=== Results ===
Team 1 \ Team 2	ARY	BHA	BSS	CCU	GTE	KID	PEE	RAI	SSA	TAG	UNI
Aryan	—	0–0	1–0	2–2	2–1	0–1	4–1	0–2	2–1	2–2	2–1
Bhawanipore		—	2–1	2–1	6–2	1–0	1–1	4–1	1–0	1–0	0–1
BSS			—	1–1	2–0	2–0	1–1	1–2	2–1	4–1	0–0
Calcutta Customs				—	3–1	1–1	2–2	0–3	3–1	3–1	3–1
George Telegraph					—	1–2	1–1	3–0	2–0	1–1	0–1
Kidderpore						—	3–2	0–0	3–0 (Note: As per the rules of IFA, Kidderpore was awarded 3 points as their opponents Southern Samity were punished with one match ban for forfeiting their previous match.)	1–0	1–1
Peerless							—	0–2	0–1	2–0	1–5
Railway								—	1–1	2–2	1–0
Southern Samity									—	3–0	0–3 (Note: United was awarded 3 points as Southern Samity forfeited the match owing to harsh decisions made by the officials against them. The scoreline was 1-1 at the time of forfeit.)
Tollygunge Agragami										—	3–5
United											—

Updated to match(es) played on 16 September 2022. Source: Soccerway
Legend: Blue = left column team win; Yellow = draw; Red = top row team win.

=== Positions by round ===
The table lists the positions of teams after each round mentioned in official fixtures.

Round	1	2	3	4	5	6	7	8	9	10
Aryan	4	7	6	6	6	6	5	5	6	2
Bhawanipore	6	5	2	3	2	1	1	1	1	1
BSS	3	3	3	2	3	3	3	3	5	7
Calcutta Customs	2	2	5	5	4	4	4	7	7	6
George Telegraph	10	10	7	11	7	9	9	9	9	8
Kidderpore	7	9	11	8	10	8	7	4	2	3
Peerless	11	11	9	10	8	7	8	8	8	9
Railway	8	4	4	4	5	5	6	6	3	4
Southern Samity	9	8	10	7	9	11	11	11	11	11
Tollygunge Agragami	5	6	8	9	11	10	10	10	10	10
United	1	1	1	1	1	2	2	2	4	5

Qualification for Super Six
Relegation to Premier Division B

=== Results by games ===
Match	1	2	3	4	5	6	7	8	9	10
Aryan	D	L	W	D	W	L	W	W	D	W
Bhawanipore	W	W	W	L	W	W	W	W	D	D
BSS	W	W	W	L	W	D	D	L	D	L
Calcutta Customs	W	W	L	D	D	D	W	L	D	W
George Telegraph	L	L	D	L	W	L	D	L	L	W
Kidderpore	L	L	D	D	W	W	W	W	W	D
Peerless	L	D	L	W	D	D	L	L	L	D
Railway	L	W	W	D	L	W	D	W	W	D
Southern Samity	L	L	L	W	L	L	L	D	W	L
Tollygunge Agragami	D	L	L	L	L	D	L	L	L	D
United	W	W	W	W	W	L	L	D	L	D

Source: Flashscore
W = Win; D = Draw; L = Loss

== Super Six ==
ATK Mohun Bagan withdrew from the league, for the second time in a row, two days prior to their first game on 26 September against Bhawanipore. They sent a letter to IFA, citing their lack of a reserve squad. IFA decided to continue Super Six with only five teams instead of promoting the fourth-placed team in the first stage.

=== Standings ===
Pos	Team	Pld	W	D	L	GF	GA	GD	Pts	Qualification
1	Mohammedan (C)	4	3	1	0	10	1	+9	10	Champions
2	Bhawanipore	4	2	1	1	7	5	+2	7	Eligible for I-League 2 (Note: If the top teams are already playing in national leagues, then the next highest ranked team(s) would be eligible for I-League 2.)
3	Aryan	4	1	2	1	4	6	−2	5	Eligible for I-League 2
4	East Bengal	4	0	3	1	2	4	−2	3	
5	Kidderpore	4	0	1	3	2	9	−7	1	
6	ATK Mohun Bagan	0	0	0	0	0	0	0	0	Withdrew

Updated to match(es) played on 1 November. Source: Soccerway
Rules for classification: 1) points; 2) goal difference; 3) number of goals scored; 4) head-to-head points; 5) head-to-head goal difference; 6) fair play ranking; 7) drawing of lots
(C) Champions

=== Results ===
Team 1 \ Team 2	ARY	BHA	EAB	KID	MOH
Aryan	—	1–1	1–1	2–1	0–3
Bhawanipore		—	2–0	4–1	0–3
East Bengal			—	0–0	1–1
Kidderpore				—	0–3
Mohammedan					—

Updated to match(es) played on 1 November 2022. Source: Soccerway
Legend: Blue = left column team win; Yellow = draw; Red = top row team win.

=== Positions by round ===
The table lists the positions of teams after each round mentioned in official fixtures.

Round	1	2	3	4	5
Aryan	5	4	4	3	3
Bhawanipore	4	5	2	2	2
East Bengal	2	2	3	4	4
Kidderpore	3	3	5	5	5
Mohammedan	1	1	1	1	1

Champions

=== Results by games ===
Match	1	2	3	4
Aryan	L	D	W	D
Bhawanipore	L	W	W	D
East Bengal	D	D	L	D
Kidderpore	D	L	L	L
Mohammedan	W	W	W	D

Source: Flashscore
W = Win; D = Draw; L = Loss

== Season statistics ==
=== Top scorers ===
As of 30 September 2022

Rank	Player	Club	Goals
1	(India) Naro Hari Shrestha	Calcutta Customs	9
2	(Cameroon) Aristide Vaillant	Aryan	7
3	(India) Jiten Murmu	Bhawanipore	6
3	(Ivory Coast) Gnohere Krizo	Bhawanipore	6
4	(Liberia) Ansumana Kromah	Tollygunge Agragami	5
4	(Ghana) Chabala	Railway	5
4	(India) Robi Hansda	Calcutta Customs	5
4	(Uganda) Juma Balinya	Peerless	5
4	(India) Nikhil Kadam	Bhawanipore	5
5	(Trinidad and Tobago) Willis Plaza	Bhawanipore	4
5	(Trinidad and Tobago) Marcus Joseph	Mohammedan	4
5	(Zimbabwe) Davis Kamanga	United	4
5	(Ghana) Kwesi Sesey	BSS	4
5	(India) Sougata Hansda	George Telegraph	4

=== Hat-tricks ===
Note: In the result, the score of the player's team is mentioned before.

Player	For	Against	Result	Date
(Zimbabwe) Davis Kamanga	United	Peerless	5–1	2 August 2022
(India) Subrata Murmu	United	Tollygunge Agragami	5–3	8 August 2022
(Liberia) Ansumana Kromah	Tollygunge Agragami	United	3–5	8 August 2022
(India) Jiten Murmu	Bhawanipore	George Telegraph	6–2	23 August 2022
(India) Nikhil Kadam	Bhawanipore	Kidderpore	4–1	20 October 2022

=== Clean sheets ===
Rank	Player	Club	Clean sheets
1	(India) Priyant Singh	Kidderpore	3

== Premier Division B ==
CFL Premier Division B
- Season: 2022
- Dates: 2 August – 29 September
- Champions: Kalighat MS
- Promoted: Kalighat MS; Asos Rainbow
- Relegated: Wari; West Bengal Police
- Matches: 56
- Goals: 124 (2.21 per match)
- Biggest win: Pathachakra 5–0 West Bengal Police

This year the league followed the double round-robin format after a gap of two years due to COVID-19 pandemic. Kalighat MS and Asos Rainbow were relegated from the Premier Division A last time it was held, while Wari and Police AC were promoted from the CFL 1st Division.

=== Standings ===
Pos	Team	Pld	W	D	L	GF	GA	GD	Pts	Qualification or relegation
1	Kalighat MS (P)	14	11	1	2	26	11	+15	34	Promotion to Premier Division A
2	Asos Rainbow (P)	14	9	3	2	27	9	+18	30	Promotion to Premier Division A
3	Police AC	14	5	4	5	16	15	+1	19	
4	Eastern Railway	14	3	7	4	12	13	−1	16	
5	FCI (East Zone)	14	4	4	6	11	13	−2	16	
6	Pathachakra	14	4	4	6	14	17	−3	16	
7	Wari (R)	14	4	4	6	7	13	−6	16	Relegation to First Division
8	West Bengal Police FC (R)	14	1	3	10	11	33	−22	6	Relegation to First Division

Updated to match(es) played on 29 September 2022. Source: Kolkata Football
(P) Promoted; (R) Relegated
