= 2016 CFL Premier Division =

Calcutta Football League season

CFL Premier Division
- Season: 2016–17
- Champions: East Bengal (38th title)
- Matches: 135
- Goals: 289 (2.14 per match)
- All statistics correct as of 5 October 2016.

The 2016 Calcutta Football League Premier Division was the 118th season of the CFL Premier Division, a state league within the Indian state of West Bengal. The league is divided into two groups – Group A and Group B. The Championship title is awarded only to the Group A winner, while four teams from Group A are relegated to Group B at the end of the season and 4 teams from Group B are simultaneously promoted to Group A for the next season. The fixtures of Group A kicked off on 27 July 2016, and of Group B on 16 July 2016.

This will also be the first time in history that a trophy will be awarded to the Group A champions, on the day of the last match of the league. The Indian Football Association also took a decision to award the Amal Dutta award to the coach adjudged "Best coach of the league". The association also announced that a monetary award amounting to Rs. 25 lakhs will be given to the champions of Group A.

East Bengal were crowned champions for a record 38th time in history and for the 7th consecutive season. This is also the 3rd time that they have won the league without dropping a single point.

== Premier Division A ==
CFL Premier Division A
- Season: 2016–17
- Relegated: United; Aryan; Bhawanipore; George Telegraph
- Matches: 55
- Goals: 135 (2.45 per match)
- Top goalscorer: (Nigeria) Daniel Bedemi (MOH) (Scotland) Darryl Duffy (MOH) (6 goals)
- Highest scoring: East Bengal vs United; 4–3 (16 August 2016) (7 goals)
- Longest winning run: East Bengal (10 matches)
- Longest unbeaten run: East Bengal (10 matches)
- Longest winless run: George Telegraph (10 matches)
- Longest losing run: George Telegraph (9 matches)

=== Standings ===
Pos	Team	Pld	W	D	L	GF	GA	GD	Pts	Qualification or relegation
1	East Bengal (Note: East Bengal were awarded 3 points in the match against Mohun Bagan as Mohun Bagan refused to field a team for the match citing inadequate time for practice. The result of the match was declared by IFA to be 3–0 in favour of East Bengal.) (C)	10	10	0	0	19	6	+13	30	Champion
2	Mohammedan	10	6	2	2	13	7	+6	20	
3	Mohun Bagan	10	6	1	3	20	7	+13	19	
4	Southern Samity	10	4	3	3	11	8	+3	15	
5	Peerless SC	10	3	5	2	12	11	+1	14	
6	Army XI	10	4	2	4	14	16	−2	14	
7	Tollygunge Agragami	10	3	4	3	10	11	−1	13	
8	United (R)	10	3	2	5	15	15	0	11	Relegation to Premier Division B
9	Aryan (R)	10	2	3	5	7	14	−7	9	Relegation to Premier Division B
10	Bhawanipore (R)	10	1	3	6	11	14	−3	6	Relegation to Premier Division B
11	George Telegraph (R)	10	0	1	9	6	29	−23	1	Relegation to Premier Division B

Source: Soccerway
(C) Champions; (R) Relegated

=== Results ===
Home \ Away	ARM	ARN	BHA	KEB	GTL	MSC	MOH	PRL	SOU	TOL	USC
Army XI	—	0–0	3–2	1–2	4–1	0–1	0–6	4–2	0–1	1–1	1–0
Aryan	—	—	2–1	0–1	1–1	0–1	1–5	0–3	1–2	2–0	0–0
Bhawanipore	—	—	—	1–2	4–0	0–1	0–1	1–1	0–0	2–2	0–2
East Bengal	—	—	—	—	1–0	1–0	3–0^{1}	2–0	2–1	1–0	4–3
George Telegraph	—	—	—	—	—	1–4	0–4	1–2	0–2	1–2	1–5
Mohammedan	—	—	—	—	—	—	1–0	0–0	2–1	1–2	2–2
Mohun Bagan	—	—	—	—	—	—	—	0–0	1–0	0–1	3–1
Peerless SC	—	—	—	—	—	—	—	—	1–1	1–1	2–1
Southern Samity	—	—	—	—	—	—	—	—	—	1–1	2–0
Tollygunge Agragami	—	—	—	—	—	—	—	—	—	—	0–1
United	—	—	—	—	—	—	—	—	—	—	—

Updated to match(es) played on 28 September 2016. Source: Soccerway

Home team won; Match drawn; Away team won;

^{1} East Bengal were awarded 3 points in the match against Mohun Bagan as Mohun Bagan refused to field a team for the match citing inadequate time for practice. The result of the match was declared by IFA to be 3–0 in favour of East Bengal.

=== Statistics ===
==== Top Scorers ====
As of 28 September 2016

Source: kolkatafootball.com

6 goals

- (Nigeria) Daniel Bedemi (MOH)
- (Scotland) Darryl Duffy (MOH)

5 goals

- (Nigeria) Joël Sunday (TOL)
- (India) V.P.Suhair (USC)

4 goals

- (South Korea) Do Dong-Hyun (KEB)
- (India) Manvir Singh (MSC)
- (Ivory Coast) Zikahi Leonce Dedoz (MSC)
- (Liberia) Ghanefo Kromah (PRL)
- (India) Ashim Biswas (SOU)
- (India) M.Basant Singh (SOU)

3 goals

- (India) Sanjay Rana (ARM)
- (India) Jagannath Sana (BHA)
- (India) Tirthankar Sarkar (BHA)
- (India) Jiten Murmu (KEB)
- (India) Lalrindika Ralte (KEB)
- (Ivory Coast) Bayi Kamo (GTL)
- (India) Prabir Das (MOH)
- (Liberia) Eric Brown (USC)

2 goals

- (India) Anthony Chettri (ARM)
- (India) Abhijit Sarkar (ARN)
- (Nigeria) Bolane Kazeem Amobi (ARN)
- (India) Pritam Sarkar (BHA)
- (India) Arnab Mondal (KEB)
- (India) Azharuddin Mallick (MOH)
- (India) Thangjam Singh (MOH)
- (India) Anil Kisku (PRL)
- (India) Arghya Chakraborty (PRL)
- (India) Syed Rahim Nabi (PRL)
- (India) Monotosh Chakladar (USC)
- (India) Shankar Oraon (USC)

1 goal

- (India) Arjun Tudu (ARM)
- (India) E.Alwyn (ARM)
- (India) P.Jain (ARM)
- (India) Samu Hembram (ARM)
- (India) Goutam Thakur (ARN)
- (Nigeria) Obasi Moses Louis (ARN)
- (Nigeria) Orok Essien (BHA)
- (India) Bijendra Rai (BHA)
- (India) Francis Xavier (BHA)
- (Nigeria) Adelaja (KEB)
- (England) Calum Angus (KEB)
- (India) Mohammed Rafique (KEB)
- (India) Rahul Bheke (KEB)
- (India) Subha Kumar (GTL)
- (India) Rajib Shaw (GTL)
- (India) Atinder Mani (MSC)
- (India) Dipendu Dowary (MSC)
- (India) Nitesh Chhikara (MSC)
- (India) Parminder Singh (MSC)
- (India) Usman Ashik (MSC)
- (India) Ajay Singh (MOH)
- (India) Sukhwinder Singh (PRL)
- (India) Sumit Ghosh (PRL)
- (India) Krishna Das Sharma (SOU)
- (India) Suman Hazra (SOU)
- (Liberia) Alfred Jaryan (TOL)
- (Nigeria) Kareem Omolaja (TOL)
- (India) Palsang Lama (TOL)
- (India) Reisangmei Vashum (TOL)
- (India) Surabuddin Mollick (TOL)
- (Nigeria) Bello Razaq (USC)
- (India) Budhiram Tudu (USC)
- (India) Md.Rashid (USC)

==== Hat-tricks ====
Player	For	Against	Result	Date	Ref
(Scotland) Darryl Duffy	Mohun Bagan	Aryan	5–1	6 August 2016	
(India) V.P. Suhair	United	George Telegraph	5–1	25 August 2016	
(Nigeria) Daniel Bedemi ^{4}	Mohun Bagan	Army XI	6–0	10 September 2016	

^{4} The player scored 4 goals

== Premier Division B ==
CFL Premier Division B
- Season: 2016–17
- Promoted: Pathachakra; Rainbow; Railway F.C. Calcutta Customs
- Relegated: Dalhousie
- Matches: 80
- Goals: 154 (1.93 per match)
- Highest scoring: Pathachakra vs Rainbow; 3–3 (22 September 2016) (6 goals)
- Longest winning run: Bengal Nagpur Railway; Pathachakra; Police A.C. (3 matches)
- Longest unbeaten run: Rainbow (15 matches)
- Longest winless run: Police A.C. (11 matches)
- Longest losing run: Dalhousie (6 matches)

=== Standings ===
Note: After the results of the 10th round, the teams were divided into two groups of top 6 and bottom 5. The top 6 teams are to play against each other in a single-leg format, called the championship round, while the bottom 5 teams play against each other in the same single-leg format called the relegation round. Each team carried forward their points and other records from the previous 10 matches into the championship or the relegation round.

Pos	Team	Pld	W	D	L	GF	GA	GD	Pts	Qualification or relegation
1	Pathachakra (P)	15	7	5	3	15	9	+6	26	Promotion to Premier Division A
2	Rainbow (P)	15	5	10	0	19	9	+10	25	Promotion to Premier Division A
3	Railway F.C. (P)	15	5	9	1	14	8	+6	24	Promotion to Premier Division A
4	Calcutta Customs (P)	15	6	6	3	14	8	+6	24	Promotion to Premier Division A
5	SAI Darjeeling	15	5	7	3	11	9	+2	22	Championship Round
6	Bengal Nagpur Railway	15	4	4	7	15	21	−6	16	Championship Round
7	Kalighat M.S.	14	7	2	5	16	16	0	23	Relegation Round
8	Food Corporation of India	14	4	6	4	15	12	+3	18	Relegation Round
9	Police A.C.	14	3	6	5	15	19	−4	15	Relegation Round
10	Eastern Rail (R)	14	2	4	8	8	17	−9	10	Relegation to First Division
11	Dalhousie (R)	14	1	3	10	10	24	−14	6	Relegation to First Division

Source: Thif-live
(P) Promoted; (R) Relegated

=== Results ===
Home \ Away	BNR	CCU	DAC	ERY	FCI	KMS	PAT	PAC	RFC	RAI	SAI
Bengal Nagpur Railway	—	0–4	2–1	—	1–1	1–0	0–2	—	0–1	0–2	2–3
Calcutta Customs	2–0	—	2–1	—	1–1	0–1	0–0	—	1–0	0–0	2–1
Dalhousie	—	—	—	0–1	0–0	1–3	—	1–4	—	—	—
Eastern Rail	1–3	0–0	0–1	—	1–0	0–1	—	1–2	1–1	0–0	0–1
Food Corporation of India	—	—	1–0	3–1	—	1–2	—	3–0	—	—	—
Kalighat M.S.	—	—	2–1	1–0	2–3	—	—	0–2	—	—	—
Pathachakra	1–0	1–0	3–1	—	1–0	1–0	—	—	0–1	3–3	0–1
Police A.C.	1–4	0–2	2–2	1–1	0–0	1–1	0–0	—	0–0	1–3	0–1
Railway F.C.	1–1	0–0	1–0	—	1–1	4–1	2–1	—	—	1–1	0–0
Rainbow	1–1	3–0	3–1	—	0–0	0–0	0–0	—	1–1	—	2–1
SAI Darjeeling	0–0	0–0	0–0	—	2–1	1–2	0–0	—	0–0	0–0	—

Source: Thif-live

Home team won; Match drawn; Away team won;
