= 2026 CFL Premier Division =

128th edition of CFL Premier Division

CFL Premier Division
- Season: 2026
- Dates: 12 July 2026 – 19 September 2026
- Champions: Mohun Bagan SG (31st title)
- Relegated: Diamond Harbour; Sribhumi FC
- Matches: 141
- Goals: 423 (3 per match)
- Top goalscorer: Akash Hembram; Sreenath M (10 goals each)
- Biggest win: United SC 8–0 Railway (4 September 2026)
- Highest scoring: United Kolkata 7–1 George Telegraph (13 August 2026); Pathachakra 2–6 Railway (18 August 2026); United SC 8–0 Railway (4 September 2026)
- Longest winning run: Bhawanipore (5 matches)
- Longest unbeaten run: East Bengal (13 matches)
- Longest winless run: Bidhannagar MSA; Kalighat SLA (11 matches)
- Longest losing run: George Telegraph (5 matches)
- Highest attendance: 10,500; East Bengal v Mohun Bagan Super Giant (7 September 2026)

The 2026 CFL Premier Division or 2026 Style Baazar Calcutta Football League (for sponsorship reasons) is the 128th overall season of the Calcutta Football League – highest state-level football division of West Bengal.

The 2026 edition previously had 26 teams divided into two groups of 13 in the first phase, with top 6 qualifying for the championship round and bottom 6 heading into the relegation round. Later, 2 teams withdrew from competition.

The tournament began with match between East Bengal and George Telegraph in East Bengal Ground, Kolkata on 12 July 2026 after an opening ceremony.

== Changes from last season ==
▼ Relegated to 2026 CFL 1st Division

- Southern Samity
- Army Red

▲ Promoted to 2026 CFL Premier Division

- Coal India SPA
- Bidhannagar MSA

Withdrew

- Diamond Harbour
- Sribhumi FC

== Format ==
The 2026 CFL Premier Division, like the previous 2 editions, primarily had 26 teams divided into two groups in the first phase, where each team will play twelve matches in single round robin format. After that, the top three teams from each of the two groups shall advance to the championship round, where each team will play against all the three teams from the opposite group to determine the champion. The bottom three teams from both groups will play the relegation round.

Later, Diamond Harbour and Sribhumi FC withdrew from competition. They were subsequently relegated to CFL first division league, thus causing scrapping of relegation round for this edition.

Draw for the group division was done on May 2026 by Indian Football Association.

== Venues ==
- Amal Datta Krirangan, Dum Dum
- Bankimanjali Stadium, Naihati
- Bibhutibhushan Bandyopadhyay Stadium, Barrackpore
- Bidhannagar Municipal Sports Complex, Bidhannagar
- Chinsurah Eastern Ground, Chinsurah
- East Bengal/Aryan Ground, Kolkata
- Kalyani Stadium, Kalyani
- Kishore Bharati Krirangan, Kolkata
- Mohammedan/Howrah Union Ground, Kolkata
- Mohun Bagan/Calcutta FC Ground, Kolkata
- Rabindra Sarobar Stadium, Kolkata
- Sailen Manna Stadium, Howrah
- Vidyasagar Krirangan, Barasat

== Teams ==
Group 1	Group 2
East Bengal	Mohammedan
Mohun Bagan SG	NBP Rainbow AC
Behala SS	United SC
United Kolkata	Peerless SC
Kalighat Milan Sangha	Police AC
Railway FC	Kalighat SLA
Calcutta Customs	Wari AC
MG Pathachakra	Measurers Club
TK George Telegraph	Aryan
LL Kidderpore	NA Suruchi Sangha
Bidhannagar MSA	Calcutta Police Club
Bhawanipore FC	Coal India SPA
~~Sribhumi FC~~	~~Diamond Harbour~~

== Group stage ==
=== Group 1 ===
Pos	Team	Pld	W	D	L	GF	GA	GD	Pts	Qualification	EAB	BHA	MBG	CCU	UKS	KMS	RLY	KID	BSS	PTC	GGT	BMS
1	East Bengal	11	8	3	0	27	7	+20	27	Super Six round		1–1	1–1	2–0	3–0	1–0	1–0	2–0	3–3	5–1	3–0	5–1
2	Bhawanipore	11	8	3	0	21	5	+16	27	Super Six round			2–1	2–1	4–0	1–0	2–2	0–0	3–0	2–0	1–0	3–0
3	Mohun Bagan SG	11	7	2	2	26	6	+20	23	Super Six round				0–1	1–0	3–0	3–1	1–1	w/o (Note: Behala SS gave walkover to Mohun Bagan SG, as a result they were handed a 0–3 loss.)	4–0	6–0	3–0
4	Calcutta Customs	11	5	3	3	24	12	+12	18						2–2	0–1	4–0	2–2	1–1	4–2	6–0	3–0
5	United Kolkata	11	4	4	3	22	16	+6	16							1–1	3–1	1–1	2–0	4–0	7–1	2–2
6	Kalighat MS	11	4	2	5	18	13	+5	14								1–2	1–2	0–0	6–1	4–2	4–0
7	Railway FC	11	4	2	5	20	20	0	14									5–2	2–0	6–2	0–1	1–1
8	Kidderpore	11	2	6	3	15	18	−3	12										2–5	0–0	1–1	4–0
9	Behala SS	11	3	3	5	17	21	−4	12											0–3	3–1	4–1
10	Pathachakra	11	3	1	7	12	32	−20	10												2–0	1–0
11	George Telegraph	11	2	1	8	7	33	−26	7													1–0
12	Bidhannagar MSA	11	0	2	9	5	31	−26	2													

Source: The Away End
Legend: Blue = home team win; Yellow = draw; Red = away team win.
Rules for classification: 1) points; 2) head-to-head points; 3) head-to-head goal difference; 4) goal difference; 5) number of goals scored; 6) drawing of lots

=== Group 2 ===
Pos	Team	Pld	W	D	L	GF	GA	GD	Pts	Qualification	CLI	MDS	UTD	PRL	ARY	CPC	PAC	MEA	SUS	RNB	WAR	KSL
1	Coal India SPA	11	6	4	1	18	7	+11	22	Super Six round		2–0	2–0	3–0	1–0	0–1	1–1	1–1	1–0	2–2	5–2	0–0
2	Mohammedan	11	6	3	2	18	12	+6	21	Super Six round			1–1	0–2	3–1	2–0	1–1	3–2	2–0	3–1	1–1	2–1
3	United SC	11	6	2	3	24	9	+15	20	Super Six round				1–0	1–2	2–0	3–0	0–1	5–1	2–1	8–0	1–1
4	Peerless	11	6	2	3	20	9	+11	20						1–1	0–1	3–1	1–1	w/o (Note: Suruchi Sangha gave walkover to Peerless, as a result they were handed a 0–3 loss.)	6–1	3–0	1–0
5	Aryan	11	5	4	2	18	6	+12	19							0–0	0–0	2–0	4–0	5–0	0–0	3–0
6	Calcutta Police Club	11	5	3	3	13	11	+2	18								0–2	3–3	0–0	2–1	3–1	3–0
7	Police AC	11	4	5	2	13	11	+2	17									2–2	1–0	2–1	0–0	3–0
8	Measurers Club	11	3	6	2	21	17	+4	15										2–2	4–1	4–1	1–1
9	Suruchi Sangha	11	2	3	6	11	20	−9	9											3–0	2–2	3–0
10	NBP Rainbow	11	2	1	8	13	31	−18	7												2–1	3–1
11	Wari	11	1	4	6	9	28	−19	7													1–0
12	Kalighat SLA	11	0	3	8	4	21	−17	3													

Source: The Away End
Legend: Blue = home team win; Yellow = draw; Red = away team win.
Rules for classification: 1) points; 2) head-to-head points; 3) head-to-head goal difference; 4) goal difference; 5) number of goals scored; 6) drawing of lots

== Super Six ==
Pos	Team	Pld	W	D	L	GF	GA	GD	Pts	Qualification	MBG	EAB	MDS	BHA	UTD	CLI
1	Mohun Bagan SG (C)	3	2	1	0	9	4	+5	7	Champions			3–2		1–1	5–1
2	East Bengal	3	1	2	0	8	1	+7	5				1–1		0–0	7–0
3	Mohammedan	3	1	1	1	5	4	+1	4					2–0		
4	Bhawanipore (Q)	3	1	1	1	3	2	+1	4	Eligible for I-League 3 (Note: East Bengal, Mohun Bagan SG, Mohammedan and United SC are already playing in national leagues while Coal India SPA is an institutional club making it ineligible to play in national leagues. Thus the next highest ranked team Bhawanipore is eligible for I-League 3.)					0–0	3–0
5	United SC	3	0	3	0	1	1	0	3							
6	Coal India SPA	3	0	0	3	1	15	−14	0							

Source: The Away End
Legend: Blue = home team win; Yellow = draw; Red = away team win.
Rules for classification: 1) points; 2) head-to-head points; 3) head-to-head goal difference; 4) goal difference; 5) number of goals scored; 6) drawing of lots
(C) Champions; (Q) Qualified for the phase indicated

== Top scorers ==
As of September 19th, 2026

Rank	Player	Team	Goals
1	(India) Akash Hemram	East Bengal	10
1	(India) Sreenath M	United SC	10
3	(India) Sahil Harijan	Bhawanipore	9
4	(India) Shlok Tiwari	Behala SS	8
5	(India) Rakesh Goldar	Measurers Club	7
5	(India) Tarak Hembram	Railway	7
5	(India) Marshal Kisku	Calcutta Customs	7

== Broadcasting ==
Digital broadcasting rights were given to No.10 Sports app by Indian Football Association. No TV broadcasting rights were announced.

== See also ==
- 2026–27 I-League 3
- 2026–27 Indian State Leagues
- 2026–27 in Indian football
- 2026 IFA Shield
- 2026–27 East Bengal season
- 2026–27 Mohun Bagan season
