= Jahar Das =

Indian footballer and coach

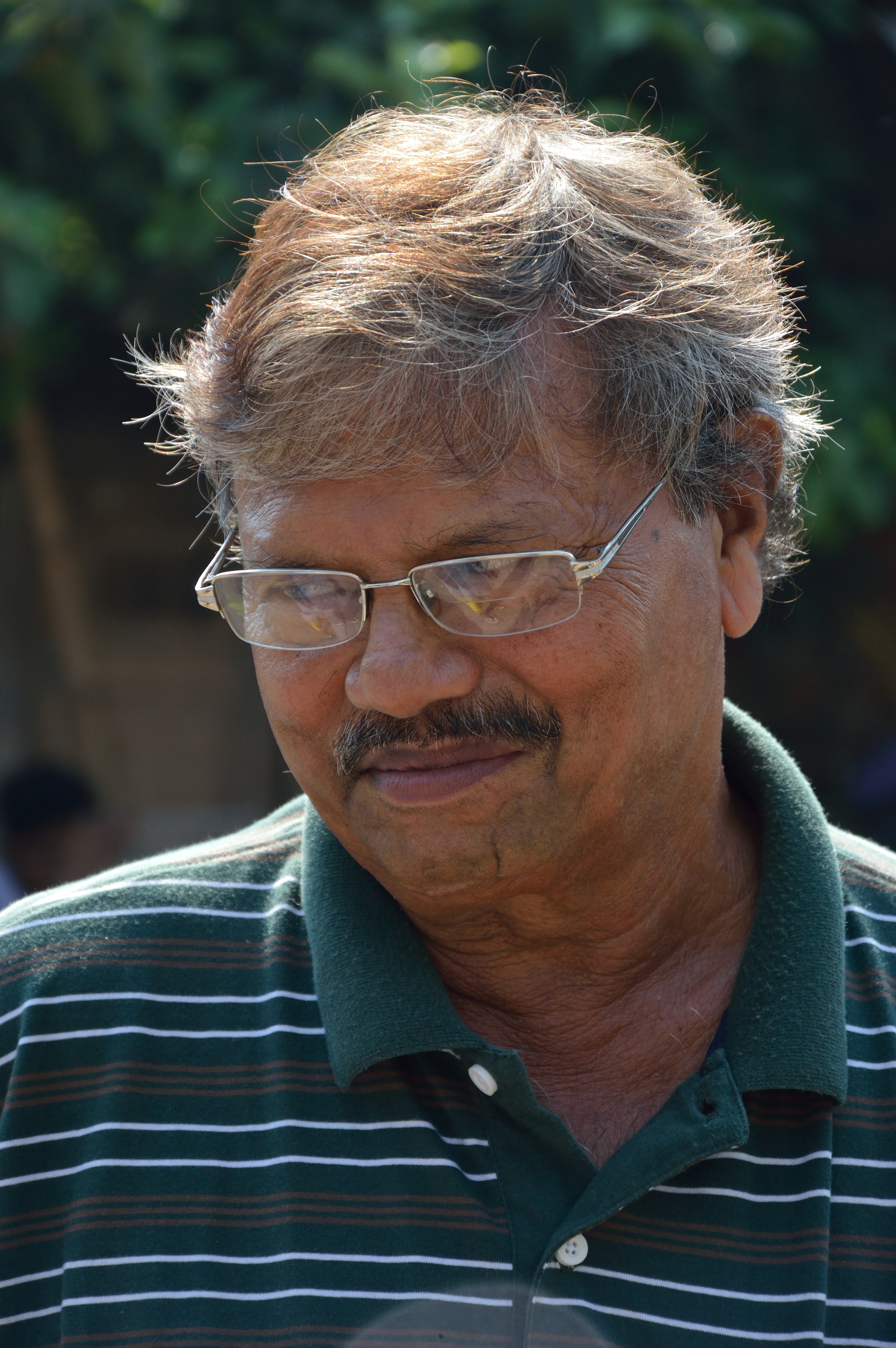
- Das in 2014

Personal information
- Date of birth: 5 April 1947 (age 79)
- Place of birth: West Bengal, India
- Position: Striker

Team information
- Current team: Kalighat Sports Lovers Association (head coach)

Senior career*
Years	Team	Apps	(Gls)
- Port Commissioner
- Mohun Bagan

Managerial career
- West Bengal
- India U17
- 2005–2006: Mohun Bagan
- 2016–2017: Aizawl
- 2019–2021: Peerless SC
- * Club domestic league appearances and goals

Jahar Das (born 5 April 1947) is a former Indian football player and current head coach. During his playing days in the 1970s, Das played for teams including Howrah Union, Aryan FC, Mohun Bagan, East Bengal, and Tata SC.

== Playing career ==
Born in West Bengal, Das had played for Port Commissioner and Mohun Bagan as a striker. He also played for Howrah Union in 1967, Aryan FC in 1970, Calcutta Port Trust in 1971, and Tata Sports Club in 1975–76.

Das later went on to represent Maharashtra team in Santosh Trophy between 1972 and 1976. After being called up to the India national football team, he was part of their goodwill tour to Russia in 1971. He also played for the Kolkata giants Mohun Bagan and East Bengal.

== Coaching career ==
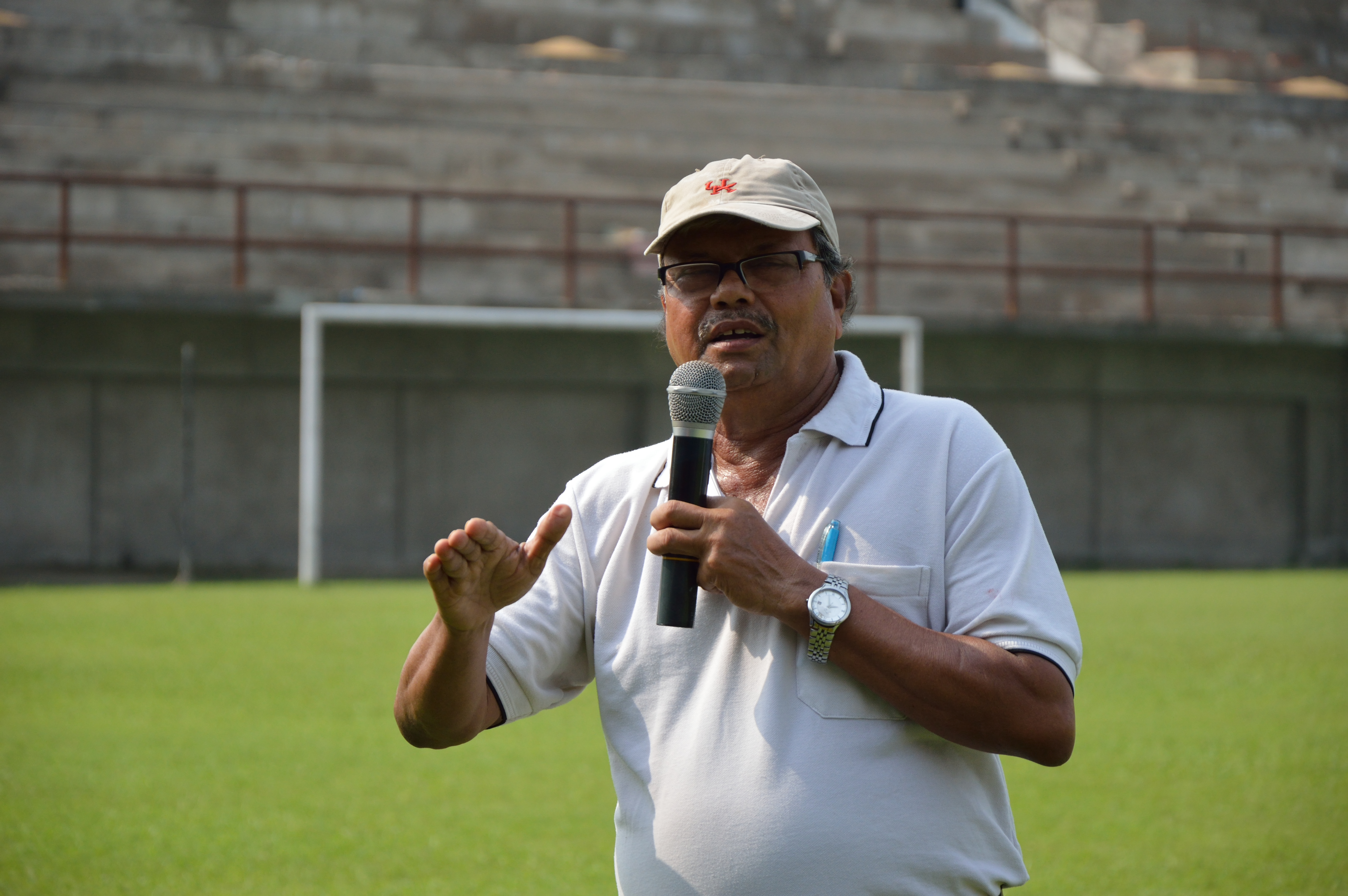
Das at the Howrah Municipal Corporation Stadium in 2013

Das began his coaching career managing the West Bengal football team in the Santosh Trophy. He then managed Bengal Mumbai from 2002 to 2003. He also briefly coached of the India under-17 side. In 2005, after the departure of Sukhwinder Singh, Das was reportedly one of the candidates put up for the vacant India senior head coach position. However, the position was given to Syed Nayeemuddin.

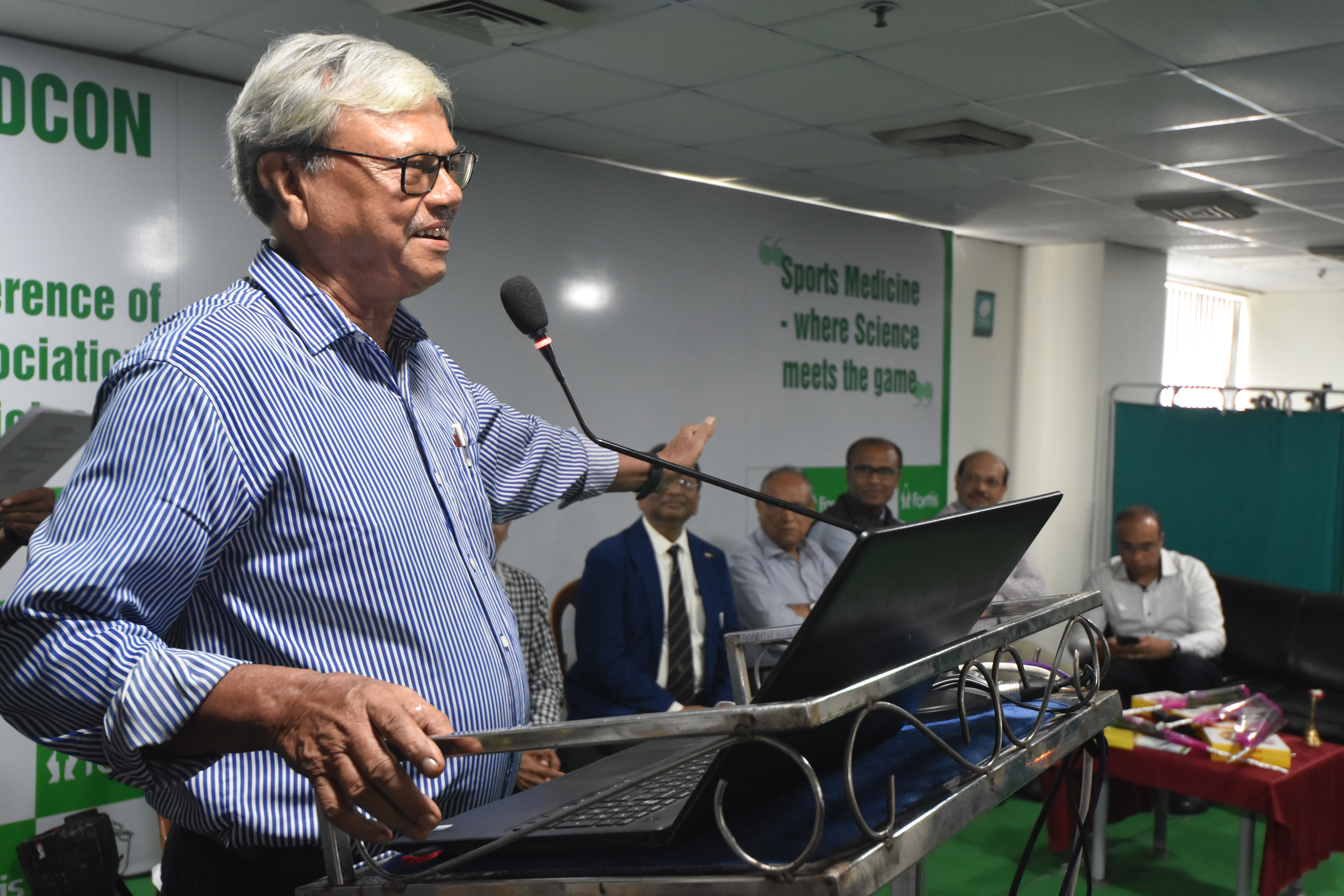
Das addressing at the inauguration of "SPORTSMEDCON 2023" at Fortis Hospital, Kolkata, July 2023.

On 7 December 2005, Das was appointed the head coach of the National Football League side, Mohun Bagan. His first match in charge came in the club's opening NFL game of the season against Mahindra United, a 0–0 draw. Das was let go on 6 March 2006 after Mohun Bagan placed ninth on the NFL table. Das would return to his previous post at Mohun Bagan as the technical director of their academy.

On 20 August 2015 it was announced that Das would become the "Head of Youth Development" at newly promoted I-League club, Aizawl. Then, on 7 February 2016, after Aizawl sacked head coach Manuel Retamero Fraile, Das was announced as the new head coach.

Peerless SC created history after winning the 2019–20 Calcutta Premier Division, defeating the three Kolkata giants; the club, managed by Das, emerged as the first small side since 1958 to win the Calcutta Football League top division. He later went on to became the vice-president and head of youth development for AFC 'A' Licence and 'Goalz Coaching Course' by the All India Football Federation.

== Personal life ==
Das is a resident of Howrah, lives at Kasundia. Married to Hasubanu, Das has a daughter named Dolanchapa.

== Honours ==
=== Manager ===
Aizawl

- Federation Cup runner-up: 2015–16
- MFA Super Cup: 2016
- Mizoram Independence Day Cup: 2016

Peerless

- Calcutta Football League: 2019–20
