= Ashok Chatterjee =

Indian footballer (1942–2020)

Ashok Chatterjee অশোক চ্যাটার্জী
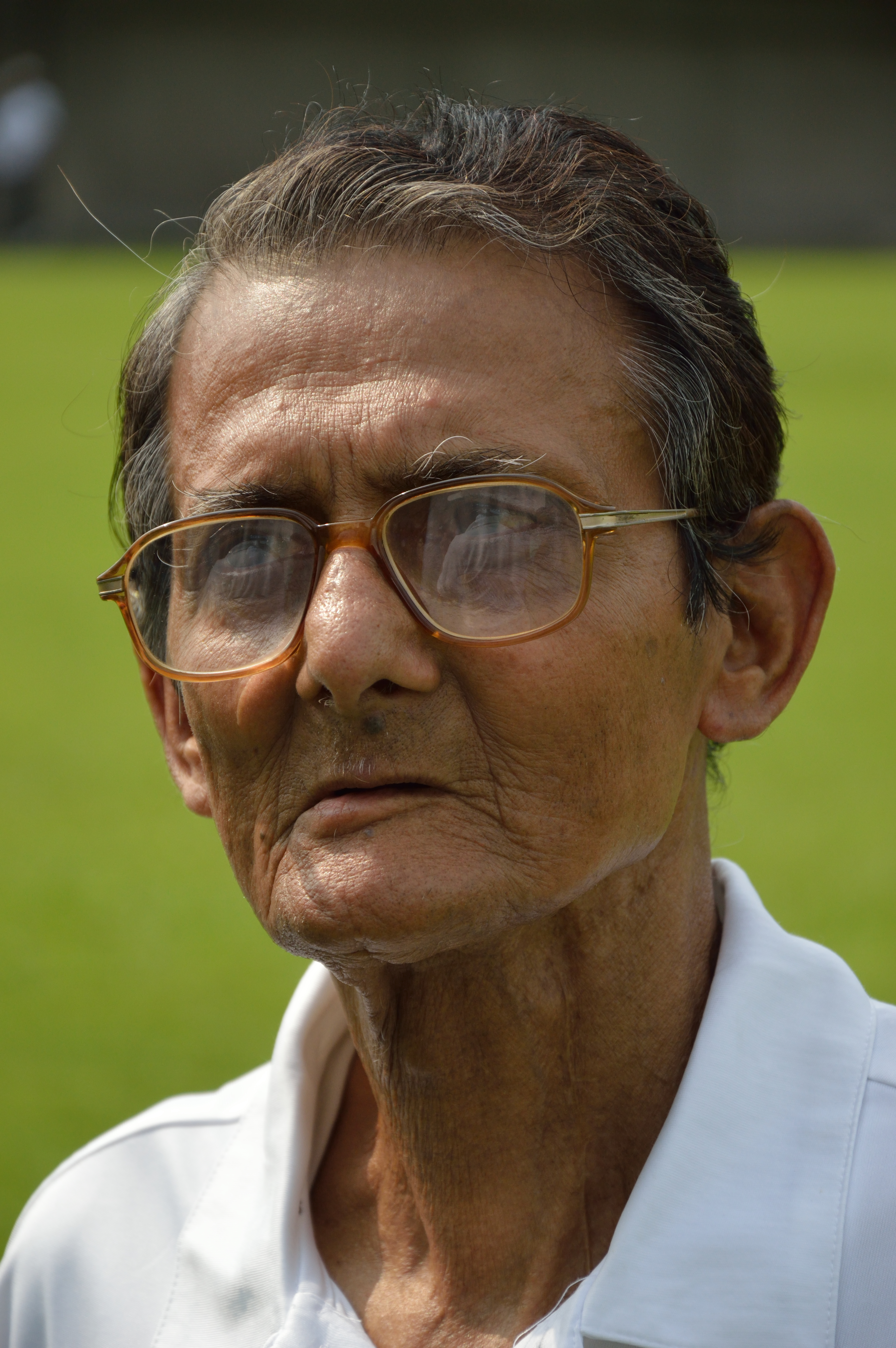
- Chatterjee in 2013

Personal information
- Date of birth: 1942
- Place of birth: Howrah, Bengal, British India
- Date of death: 22 September 2020 (aged 78)
- Place of death: Kolkata, West Bengal, India
- Position: Forward

Youth career
- Mohun Bagan

Senior career*
Years	Team	Apps	(Gls)
1959	Howrah Union		
1960–1968	Mohun Bagan		
1969-1971	East Bengal		
1972	Mohun Bagan		

International career
- India
- * Club domestic league appearances and goals

Ashok Chatterjee (1942 – 22 September 2020) was an Indian association football player.

== Playing career ==
He made his international debut for the India national team at 1965 Merdeka Cup and also represented India at the 1966 Asian Games at Bangkok. He played for both Mohun Bagan and East Bengal, alongside Howrah Union in domestic tournaments. He also represented Bengal in Santosh Trophy. With Mohun Bagan, he went to newly independent Bangladesh in May 1972, where they played against Dhaka Mohammedan and Shadhin Bangla football team. He scored the winner against Dhaka Mohammedan.

== Honours ==
India

- Merdeka Tournament third-place: 1965, 1966

East Bengal

- IFA Shield: 1970

Bengal

- Dr. B. C. Roy Trophy: 1962
- Santosh Trophy: 1969–70; runner-up: 1964

Individual

- Dr. B. C. Roy Trophy top scorer: 1962
