= Cooch Behar Cup =

Association football tournament in India

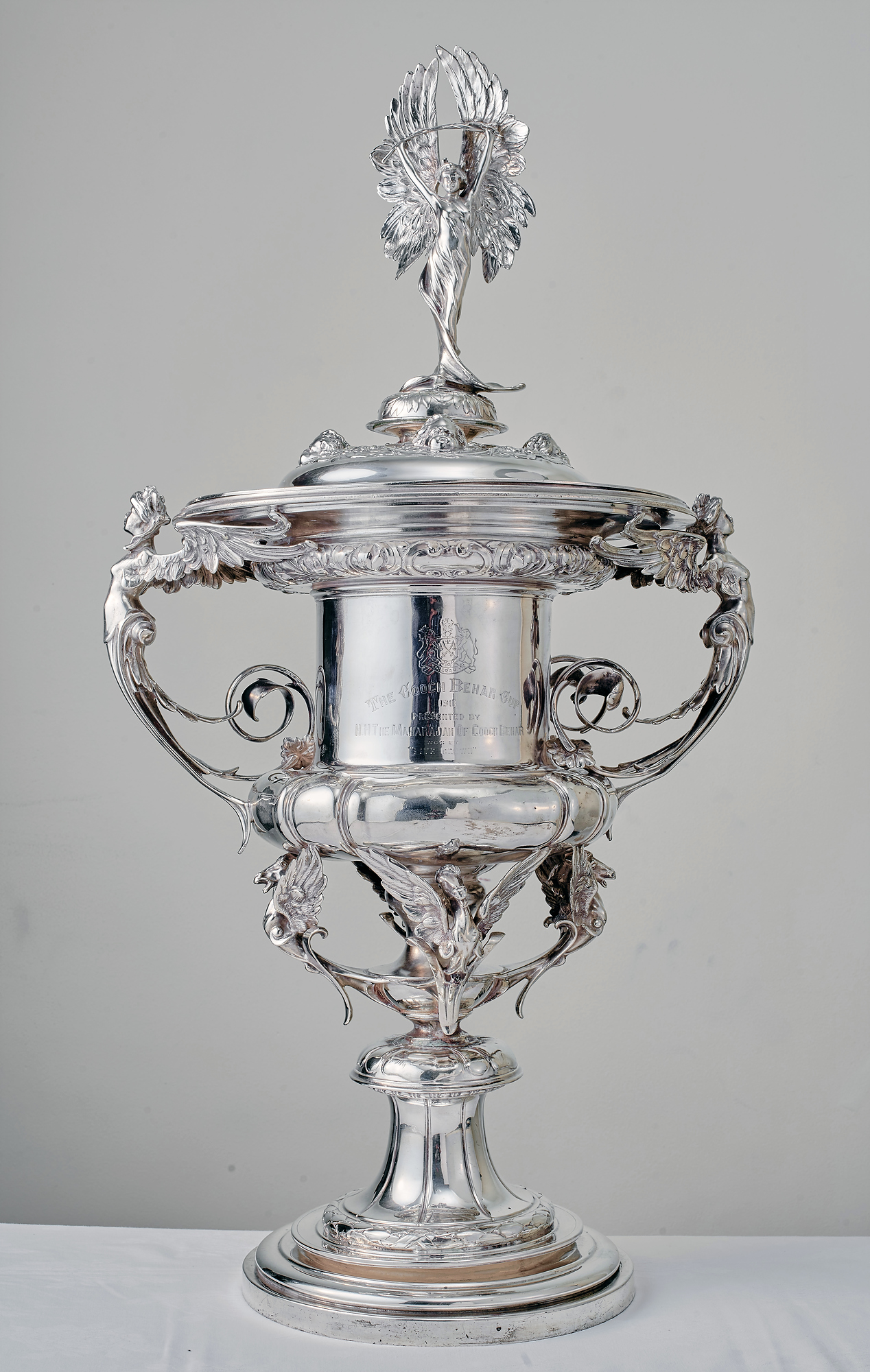
- The trophy of Cooch Behar Cup
- Organiser(s): Indian Football Association (West Bengal)
- Founded: 1893; 133 years ago
- Region: India
- Most championships: Mohun Bagan (18 titles)

The Cooch Behar Cup was an Indian football tournament held in Kolkata and organised by the Indian Football Association. Incorporated in 1893, it was one of the oldest football tournaments in Asia.

== History ==
The Maharaja of Cooch Behar Nripendra Narayan started the Cooch Behar cup in 1893 in Kolkata where both Indian and European teams participated in the tournament.

The Kolkata giants East Bengal and Mohun Bagan first played each other in this tournament in 1921.

== Results ==
List of Cooch Behar Cup Finals
Year	Winners	Ref.
1893	Fort William Arsenal	
1894	National Association	
1895	Fort William Arsenal	
1896	Fort William Arsenal	
1897	National Association	
1898	National Association	
1899	National Association	
1900	Hare Sporting FC	
1901	National Association	
1902	Mohammedan Sporting	
1903	National Association	
1904	Mohun Bagan	
1905	Mohun Bagan	
1906	Mohammedan Sporting	
1907	Mohun Bagan	
1908	Aryans Club	
1909	Mohammedan Sporting	
1910	Aryans Club	
1911	Abandoned due to death of donor of the Cup	
1912	Mohun Bagan	
1913	Abandoned due to death of the Maharaja of Cooch Behar, Jagaddipendra Narayan	
1914	Cooch Behar Team	
1915	Tajhat FC	
1916	Mohun Bagan	
1917	Kumartuli Institute	
1918	Tajhat FC	
1919	Tajhat FC	
1920	Abandoned owing to a fracas on the field of play	
1921	Mohun Bagan	
1922	Mohun Bagan	
1923	Bhawanipore Sporting	
1924	East Bengal	
1925	Mohun Bagan	
1926	Medical College	
1927	Bhawanipore Club	
1928	Mohun Bagan	
1929	Bhawanipore	
1930	East Bengal Railway	
1931	Mohun Bagan	
1932	Aryans Club	
1933	Aryans Club	
1934	Aryans Club	
1935	Mohun Bagan	
1936	Mohun Bagan	
1937	Town Club	
1941	Mohun Bagan	
1942	East Bengal	
1943	East Bengal	
1944	Mohun Bagan	
1945	East Bengal	
1947	Mohammedan Sporting	
1948	Mohun Bagan	
1949	Mohun Bagan	
1952	Mohammedan Sporting	
1960	East Bengal	
1962	Mohun Bagan	
1967	Howrah Union	
1972	Mohun Bagan	

== See also ==
- History of Indian football
