= Howrah Union =

Indian multi-sports club based in West Bengal

- Full name: Howrah Union
- Founded: 1922; 104 years ago

Howrah Union is an Indian multisports club based in the city of Kolkata (Maidan). The football team competes in the Calcutta Football League. The club previously competed in the Super Division of CFL.

== History ==
Howrah Union was formed in 1922, by late Panchanon Choungdar and Dr. Satyaban Roy along with many other sport's loving people from Howrah. Initially they played football at Howrah Maidan and the club's address was at 254, Panchanantala Road, Howrah. They eventually got affiliation from the Indian Football Association and joined thebCalcutta Football League. They got promoted to the First Division in 1929 and won the Trades Cup in 1932. In the 1936 IFA Shield, they went till the semi-finals by defeating Duke of Cornwall's Light Infantry.

Howrah Union won the Stafford Challenge Cup in 1964 under the captaincy of Olympian M. A. Sattar. In 1967 the club won the Cooch Behar Cup. Howrah Union won the Trades Cup in 2011.

== Notable players ==
Notable football players who have played or started their careers at the club include Sailen Manna and Arun Ghosh and Jahar Das. Samar Banerjee, Ashok Chatterjee, Abdus Sattar, Sahu Mewalal, Poongam Kannan.

== Home ground ==
Howrah Union uses Mohammedan Sporting—Howrah Union Ground for its sporting events.

== Honours ==
=== Domestic tournaments ===
- Stafford Cup
  - Winners (1): 1964
- Bordoloi Trophy
  - Runners-up (1): 1962
- Trades Cup
  - Winners (3): 1932, 2011, 2018
  - Runners-up (2): 2012, 2019
- Cooch Behar Cup
  - Winners (1): 1967

== Other departments ==
=== Cricket ===
Howrah Union has its men's cricket section which is affiliated to the Cricket Association of Bengal, and competes in the CAB Second Division League.

=== Field hockey ===
Men's hockey team is affiliated to the Bengal Hockey Association and competes in the Calcutta Hockey League.

=== Volleyball ===
Howrah Union also operates men's volleyball team that participates in the Elliot Shield State Volleyball Championship.
