= West Bengal Police FC =

Indian institutional football club

West Bengal Police
- Full name: West Bengal Police Football Club
- Nickname: Policemen
- Founded: 1952; 74 years ago (as West Bengal Police FC)
- Ground: Kakinara Narayanpur Ground Bhatpara
- Capacity: 15,000
- Owner: West Bengal Police
- League: CFL 1st Division
Home colours	Away colours

West Bengal Police Football Club (nicknamed "Policemen") is an Indian institutional multi-sports club based in Kolkata, West Bengal. Affiliated with the Indian Football Association, the club's football section competes in the Calcutta Premier Division.

== History ==
West Bengal Police FC as a club began their journey from Kolkata Maidan, the home of Kolkata football. The club is founded in 1952 and owned by its parent organization West Bengal Police, in Kolkata. The West Bengal Police soccer team is a professional football club based in Kolkata, India. The team was established in 1952 and has been a prominent club in the Indian football. The team is owned and operated by the West Bengal Police department and is known for its disciplined and organized style of play. The team has won several domestic and regional tournaments over the years. They have a strong fan base in Kolkata and are known for their passionate and vocal supporters. The team plays its home matches at the East Bengal Ground in Kolkata, which has a capacity of 23,000 spectators. The West Bengal Police soccer team is known for its strong defense and counter-attacking style of play. They have some of the best footballers in the region. The team is led by experienced coach and former player, Subrata Bhattacharya, who has been with the team for several years.

== Honours ==
- Trades Cup
  - Champions (1): 2008
