= Sadhna News =

Hindi-language television channel

साधना न्यूज
- Country: India
- Broadcast area: India
- Headquarters: Bhopal, India

Programming
- Language(s): Hindi
- Picture format: 576i (SDTV)

Ownership
- Owner: Asia Limited
- Sister channels: Sadhna TV

History
- Launched: 1 May 2005

Links
- Website: sadhna.com

Sadhna News is a Hindi-language 24/7 News television channel, owned by Asia Limited.
