= Dalhousie AC =

Multi-sports club in Kolkata, India

Dalhousie
- The earliest crest of Dalhousie AC
- Full name: Dalhousie Athletic Club
- Short name: DAC
- Founded: 1878; 148 years ago (as Trades Club); 1880; 146 years ago (as Dalhousie Club)
- Ground: Various
- Head coach: Mridul Banerjee
- League: CFL 1st Division
Home colours	Away colours

Dalhousie Athletic Club (Bengali: ডালহৌসি অ্যাথলেটিক ক্লাব) is an Indian professional sports club based in Kolkata, West Bengal, best known for its football section. It was established in 1880, during the British rule in India. Dalhousie has competed in the Premier Division of Calcutta Football League for a long time.

Dalhousie AC's club tent is located in Mayo Road, Kolkata Maidan, in Esplanade. Besides sporting achievements, the club is also known for organizing cultural activities alongside social initiatives.

== History ==
=== Formation and early history ===
When the [British] Calcutta Football Club was brought into existence in 1872, membership was restricted to people belonging to the upper strata of the British middle class. There was no entry for the tradesman of Calcutta amongst whom were many brilliant exponents of the game of association football. Two members Towfett and Love pooled their resources and formed the Trades Club in 1874. Six years later the name was changed to Dalhousie Athletic Club. It was largely through the initiation of Dalhousie AC that the meeting at which the Indian Football Association was formed was convened and it was through the generosity of some Dalhousie members, J. Sutherland, A. R. Brown, the first honorary secretary of IFA, and M. B. Lindsay that the cost of the splendid IFA Shield was defrayed.

— Amrita Bazar Patrika on the foundation of Dalhousie AC, written by Kumar Mukherjee.

Dalhousie AC was founded as the Trades Club in 1878, and is the second oldest football club established in the country. The athletic division was incorporated by the British employees of jute mills and members of then established organizations such as the Naval Volunteers, Police, Customs and the Armenian Club. Trades Club was renamed as "Dalhousie Club" in 1980, after the famous Dalhousie Institute, which was situated on the south side of Dalhousie Square and was originally constructed as a Monumental Hall. The club later won prestigious Calcutta Football League four times in 1910, 1921, 1928 and 1929. With having British officials in club committee, Dalhousie instituted and organized Trades Cup (the second oldest football tournament in the country) in 1889, with the help of trading community of Calcutta. It was the first open football tournament in India, where Indian, British, regimental and college clubs participated, and the club clinched the trophy in inaugural edition defeating Howrah AC 2–1. Dalhousie later achieved the prestigious IFA Shield title in 1897, and 1905. In 1905, the club reached Gladstone Cup final, held in Chinsurah, but lost 6–1 to Mohun Bagan. In Kolkata football during the British Raj, Dalhousie predominantly had a fierce rivalry with Calcutta Rangers Club, which was a non-civilian team.

=== Present years ===
In 2014, they participated in the 14th Darjeeling Gold Cup in Siliguri and reached the final, but finished as runner-up after losing 5–0 to then I-League side ONGC.

Dalhousie participated in Calcutta Premier Division B in 2014–15, and participated in tournaments like Amta Sanghati Gold Cup. They were relegated to first division in 2015–16. In February 2019, Dalhousie went to Nepal and participated in 21st edition of Budha Subba Gold Cup. Playing in the lower divisions for a couple of years, the club in June 2022, launched their new home and away jerseys at a seasonal ceremony in club tent. At the program, Dalhousie became affiliated to Mohun Bagan with aim of qualifying for the premier division, in which then AIFF senior vice-president Subrata Dutta, IFA secretary Anirban Dutta, and Mohun Bagan secretary Debasish Dutta attended.

In June 2023, the Indian Football Association (IFA) announced merger of both Premier Division A and B of the Calcutta Football League, ahead of its 125th edition; Dalhousie was allowed to compete in Group I. The club later roped in Mridul Banerjee as new head coach.

== Other department(s) ==
=== Men's cricket ===
Dalhousie AC has its cricket section, which is affiliated with the Cricket Association of Bengal (CAB). It uses the Kolkata Maidan fields for home games. The club primarily competes in the CAB conducted First Division League. They also take part in JC Mukherjee T-20 Trophy, A. N. Ghosh Memorial Trophy, CAB One Day League and P. Sen Trophy.

Noted player(s)

- (India) Mohammed Shami – Indian cricketer, plays for the Indian national cricket team in all formats, predominantly a right-arm fast bowler, appeared with Dalhousie AC in his earlier career.

=== Men's hockey ===
The men's field hockey section of Dalhousie formed during the British rule in India and the team was formerly consisting of Anglo-Indian players. The club is affiliated with Bengal Hockey Association (BHA), and participate in lower division of Calcutta Hockey League under the name of "Dalhousie Institute".

=== Darts ===
Dalhousie has both men's and women's darts section, and participate in Inter-Club Darts Tournament in Kolkata.

=== Tennis ===
Lawn tennis as a racket sport, is practiced at the Dalhousie AC. The club is an affiliated member of the Bengal Tennis Association (BTA).

== Honours ==
=== League ===
- Calcutta Football League
  - Champions (4): 1910, 1921, 1928, 1929

=== Cup ===
- IFA Shield (Note: Fourth oldest football tournament, organized by the IFA (W.B.), and played between the local clubs of West Bengal and other invited ones.)
  - Champions (2): 1897, 1905
  - Runners-up (5): 1900, 1902, 1922, 1927, 1928
- Trades Cup
  - Champions (2): 1889, 2019
  - Runners-up (1): 1907
- Gladstone Cup
  - Runners-up (1): 1905
- Darjeeling Gold Cup
  - Runners-up (1): 2014

== See also ==
- Football in Kolkata
- History of Indian football
- Football clubs in Kolkata
