= BSS Sporting Club =

Indian football club in Kolkata, India

BSS Sporting
- Full name: Behala Sanskritik Sammilani Sporting Club
- Nickname: Behala Warriors
- Short name: BSS; BSC
- Founded: 2015; 11 years ago
- Ground: Sailen Manna Stadium
- Capacity: 15,000
- Owner: Jayanta Chakraborty
- Head coach: Souren Dutta
- League: CFL Premier Division
Home colours	Away colours

BSS Sporting Club (Bengali: বিএসএস স্পোর্টিং ক্লাব) is a professional football club based in Kolkata, West Bengal. Founded in 2015, the club competes in the CFL Premier Division, the top-tier football league in West Bengal organised by the Indian Football Association, football governing body of West Bengal.

== History ==
B.S.S. Sporting Club, which started its journey in the year 2015, has already become a pioneer in the Kolkata football circuits. It has created history by becoming champions for consecutive 3 years in the CFL lower divisions, before stepping into the Premier Division. In 2018–19 season, the club was managed by Arun Kumar Ghosh. In 2019, B.S.S. Sporting participated in the Governor's Gold Cup in Sikkim.

B.S.S. Sporting has been participating in the prestigious IFA Shield tournament since 2020.

== Logo ==
The first logo of the club

== Stadium ==
Sailen Manna Stadium (also known as Howrah Municipal Corporation Stadium) is club's home stadium, together with Baksha Sporting Association Ground.

== Personnel (2026) ==
Position	Name
Head coach	(India) Biswanath Kundu
Team manager	(India) Akash Mukherjee
Assistant coach	(India) Subrata Biswas
Goalkeeping coach	(India) Santanu Basel
Fitness coach	(India) Kartick Kumar Arosh
Physio	(India) Anupam Mondal

== Statistics and records ==
- 2020-21 CFL Premier Division A: Quarter-Final
- 2019-20 CFL Premier Division A: 6th place
- 2018-19 CFL Premier Division B: 4th place
- 2017-18 CFL 1st Division: 1st place
- 2016-17 CFL 2nd Division: 1st place
- 2015-16 CFL 3rd Division: 1st place

== Honours ==
=== League ===
- CFL 1st Division
  - Champions (1): 2017
- CFL 2nd Division
  - Champions (1): 2016
- CFL 3rd Division
  - Champions (1): 2015

=== Cup ===
- Trades Cup
  - Champions (1): 2017
- Republic Cup Lumding
  - Champions (1): 2023

== See also ==
- Football in Kolkata
- List of football clubs in West Bengal
