= Wari AC =

Association football club in India

Wari উয়াড়ী
- Full name: Wari Athletic Club
- Founded: 1898; 128 years ago (as Wari Club); 1949; 77 years ago (as Wari Athletic Club)
- Ground: Various
- Chairman: Indranath Paul
- Head coach: Swapan Biswas
- League: CFL Premier Division
- Website: wariathletic.com
Home colours	Away colours

Wari Athletic Club (Bengali: উয়াড়ী অ্যাথলেটিক ক্লাব) is a professional multi-sports club based in Kolkata, West Bengal. It currently competes in the CFL Premier Division.

Wari formerly competed in the CFL First Division, second tier of the Calcutta Football League system.

The club was established in 1898 as Wari Club in Dacca, East Bengal (present-day Bangladesh). Following the partition of India, Calcutta-based members of the club shifted a branch in the city, and it continues to participate in state tournaments conducted by the Indian Football Association.

== History ==
=== Formation and journey in Dacca ===
When the Wellington Club was discontinued, a few of its sports-loving members in 1898 went on to form the Wari Club at Dacca and thus was established the oldest club in Dhaka. Zamindar Rai Bahadur Surendranath Roy played a key role in the formation of the club. The first success came in 1910 at Cooch Behar, when Wari defeated the British Kings' House club at a tournament. After gaining popularity, the club in 1930, found their playing field at Paltan ground in Dacca. They also had moderate success in the prestigious IFA Shield tournament until 1945.

From 1931, Wari also expanded to other sports like cricket, hockey, tennis, volleyball, table tennis and indoor games.

=== Later years after partition in Calcutta ===
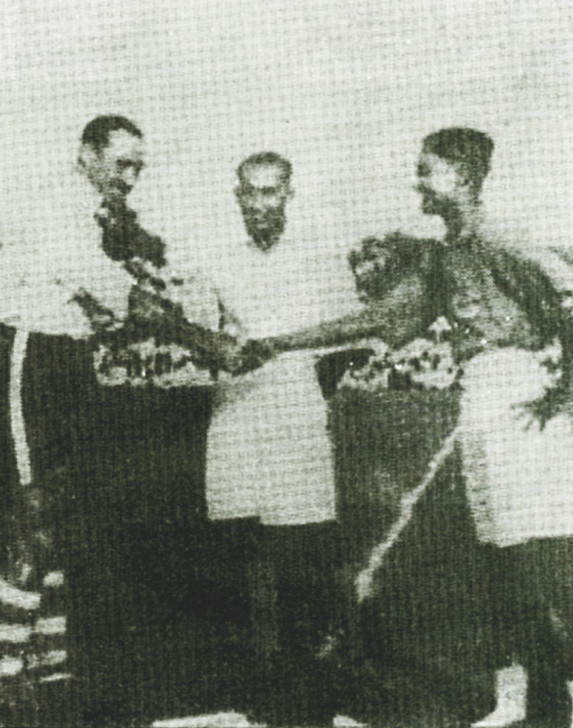
Wari AC co-founder and then DSA captain Pakhi Sen (on right) and Islington Corinthas captain P Clark shake hand just before the match in 1937

Following the partition of India, while the main Wari club remained in Dacca, a branch of the club shifted its operations as Wari Athletic Club in Calcutta by 1949. The founders of the club, Bhupendra Mohan Sengupta, also known as Pakhi Sen, (played for East Bengal in 1939 and Dacca XI in 1937), Tejes Bagha Shome and Dinesh Dutta were all members of the Dacca Wari Club before the Partition. Through the initiative of the AIFF official Pankaj Gupta, they were inducted into Calcutta Football League third division by 1949. By 1952, they got promoted to First Division and even reached the semi-finals of 1953 IFA Shield. The next year in 1954, Wari AC finished as runners up in the Calcutta Football League. The club achieved fame when they defeated East Bengal 1–0 in the CFL in 1978, which prevented the "red and gold brigade" from retaining the title it won seven times between 1970 and 1977. 1984 season was disastrous for the club as they finished in bottom of the league table consisting of twenty seven teams, and was relegated to third division. In 2003, Wari appointed legendary Iranian-Indian footballer Jamshid Nassiri as its technical director. In 2005, the club reached final of the Trades Cup.

After getting promotion from the CFL First Division (third tier) in 2019, the club on 28 July 2022, unveiled their new jerseys and announced new sponsors Maco Chicken and Hotel Royal Bengal, ahead of the CFL Premier Division B kickoff. Wari got relegated to the third tier again in 2022 Premier B season with sixteen points in fourteen matches.

In June 2023, the IFA announced that they have merged both Premier Division A and B of the Calcutta Football League ahead of its 125th edition, in which Wari was included in Group II.

== Other departments ==
=== Field hockey ===
Wari AC has its field hockey division, which is active since its foundation. Affiliated with the Bengal Hockey Association (BHA), the team previously competed in Beighton Cup, which is one of world's oldest field hockey tournaments.

=== Men's cricket ===
Wari AC has a men's cricket section. It is affiliated with the Cricket Association of Bengal (CAB), which is the governing body of cricket in West Bengal. Based at Tent Maidan, in Mayo Road of Kolkata, the club primarily participates in tournaments conducted by CAB, including First Division League, J.C. Mukherjee T-20 Trophy, A. N. Ghosh Memorial Trophy, CAB One Day League and P. Sen Trophy.

=== Women's cricket ===
Wari operates women's cricket teams, and takes part in CAB Women's Club T20 League annually.

== Notable players ==
The club is known for bringing up talents in Kolkata football. Players like Tushar Rakshit, Ashim Shome, Tapas Shome, Nimai Goswami, Santo Mitra began their playing career in Wari. Legendary goalkeeper Pradyut Barman started his playing career with the club in 1957. Bhabani Ray was one of the earliest known stars of the club who later went on to represent India at the 1970 Asian Games. Parimal Dey played for Wari from 1961 to 1963, when Bhaga Som was coach. Samaresh Chowdhury appeared from 1967 to 1969. Pritam Kotal, who represented India at the 2019 AFC Asian Cup, played for Wari until 2010.

== Honours ==
=== Association football ===
League

- Calcutta Football League
  - Runners-up (1): 1954
- CFL Third Division
  - Champions (1): 1949

Cup

- Trades Cup
  - Runners-up (2): 2005, 2016

=== Cricket ===
- CAB Women's T-20 League
  - Champions (1): 2023–24

== See also ==
- History of Indian football
- List of football clubs in India
- Football in Kolkata
