= Trades Cup =

Association football tournament in India

Trades Cup ট্রেডস কাপ
- Organiser(s): Indian Football Association (West Bengal)
- Founded: 1889; 137 years ago
- Abolished: 2019; 7 years ago
- Region: India
- Teams: 24
- Last champions: Dalhousie AC (2nd title)
- Most championships: Mohun Bagan (11 titles)

The Trades Cup (also known as the Trades Challenge Cup or IFA Trades Challenge Cup) was an Indian football tournament held in Kolkata and organised by Indian Football Association. Incorporated in 1889, it was the second-oldest football tournament in Asia and the oldest in Kolkata. It was the traditional curtain raiser for the Kolkata football season.

== History ==
The Trades Cup was instituted in 1889 by the trading community of Calcutta and was organised by the Dalhousie AC committee. It was the first open football tournament in India, where Indian, British, regimental and college clubs participated.

The first Indian club to win a match against a British team was Nagendra Prasad Sarbadhikari's Sovabazar Club. They won the opening match of the 1892 Trades Cup by defeating the East Surrey Regiment with the score of 2–1. The first Indian club to win the Trades Cup was the National Association who won the trophy in the 1900 edition. The Indian club from South Calcutta under the guidance of Manmatha Ganguly defeated the British side, Shibpur Engineering College on 11 August 1900 at the Shobhabazar Ground. Mohun Bagan completed a hat-trick of Trades Cup titles between 1906 and 1908, which enabled them to make their IFA Shield debut in 1909.

The Trades Cup was revived after not being held for 25 years in 2004 by the IFA. The tournament gives the Kolkata clubs outside the "Big Three" playing in the Premier and lower divisions the chance to field and organise their teams ahead of the start of their league season.

== Results ==
List of Trades Cup Finals
| Year | Winners | Score | Runners-up | Ref. |
|---|---|---|---|---|
| 1889 | Dalhousie | 2–1 | Howrah | |
| 1890 | (United Kingdom) The Buffs Regiment | | | |
| 1891 | (United Kingdom) 2nd King's Liverpool Regiment | | | |
| 1892 | (United Kingdom) 1st East Lancashire Regiment | | | |
| 1893 | St Xavier's College | | | |
| 1894 | Medical College | | | |
| 1895 | Medical College (2) | | | |
| 1896 | Shibpur Engineering College | | | |
| 1897 | Apprentice Engineers' Recreation Club, Jamalpore | | | |
| 1898 | Apprentice Engineers' Recreation Club, Jamalpore (2) | | | |
| 1899 | Hastings FC | | | |
| 1900 | National Association | | Shibpur Engineering College | |
| 1901 | Shibpur Engineering College (2) | | | |
| 1902 | National Association (2) | | | |
| 1903 | Medical College (3) | | | |
| 1904 | Medical College (4) | | | |
| 1905 | Shibpur Engineering College (3) | | | |
| 1906 | Mohun Bagan | | | |
| 1907 | Mohun Bagan (2) | 3–2 | Dalhousie B | |
| 1908 | Mohun Bagan (3) | | | |
| 1909 | Wanderers | | | |
| 1910 | Eastern India Railway, Asansol | | | |
| 1911 | (French India) Chandernagore FC | | | |
| 1912 | National Association (3) | | | |
| 1913 | Aryan | | | |
| 1914 | Kumartuli | | | |
| 1932 | Howrah Union | | | |
| 1938 | Mohun Bagan (4) | | | |
| 1939 | Mohun Bagan (5) | | | |
| 1943 | Mohun Bagan (6) | | | |
| 1944 | Mohun Bagan (7) | | | |
| 1945 | Mohun Bagan (8) | | | |
| 1949 | Mohun Bagan (9) | | | |
| 1950 | Mohun Bagan (10) | | | |
| 1960 | East Bengal | | | |
| 1965 | Mohun Bagan (11) | | | |
| 1966 | East Bengal (2) | | | |
| 1975 | East Bengal (3) | | | |
| 1976 | East Bengal (4) | | | |
| 1977–2003 | Not held | | | |
| 2004 | Calcutta | 2–1 | Eastern Railway | |
| 2005 | Eastern Railway | (3–2 p) | Wari | |
| 2006 | Peerless | 0–0 (5–4 p) | United | |
| 2007 | Chirag United | 3–1 | Eastern Railway | |
| 2008 | West Bengal Police | 3–0 | SAIL | |
| 2011 | Howrah Union (2) | 1–0 | Food Corporation of India | |
| 2012 | Janbazar SC | 1–0 | Howrah Union | |
| 2013 | Pathachakra FC | 1–0 | Milan Bithee FC | |
| 2014 | Food Corporation of India | 5–1 | Mohammedan AC | |
| 2015 | City AC | 2–1 | Barisha SC | |
| 2016 | Calcutta Port Trust | 0–0 (5–4 p) | Wari | |
| 2017 | City AC (2) | 2–1 (5–4 p) | BSS | |
| 2018 | Howrah Union (3) | | Calcutta Police | |
| 2019 | Dalhousie (2) | 2–1 | Howrah Union | |

== See also ==
- History of Indian football
- Football in Kolkata
- List of oldest football competitions
