= Pathachakra Club =

Association football club in Kolkata, India

Pathachakra Club পাঠচক্র ক্লাব
- Full name: Mamoni & Aashiyana Group Pathachakra Club
- Nickname: Pathachakra
- Short name: PTC
- Founded: 1956; 69 years ago
- Owner(s): Mamoni & Aashiyana Group
- Head coach: Partha Sen
- League: CFL Premier Division
Home colours	Away colours

Pathachakra Club (Bengali: পাঠচক্র ক্লাব) is a professional football club based in Kolkata, West Bengal. The club currently competes in the CFL Premier Division, the top-tier football league in West Bengal, organised by the Indian Football Association. The club is currently attached to United Sports Club, another football club of Kolkata.
