= George Telegraph SC =

Indian association football club

George Telegraph
- Full name: George Telegraph Sports Club
- Nickname: Georgians
- Founded: 1925; 101 years ago
- Stadium: Rabindra Sarobar Stadium; Barasat Stadium
- Head coach: Goutam Ghosh
- League: CFL Premier Division
Home colours	Away colours

George Telegraph Sports Club is an Indian professional football club based in Kolkata, West Bengal, that competes in the Calcutta Football League, the top tier state football league in West Bengal. The club plays all their home matches at the Rabindra Sarobar Stadium. They have also competed in the I-League 2nd Division, the second tier of the Indian football league system.

Founded in 1925 and affiliated with the Indian Football Association (IFA), the club is known by its nickname "Georgians".

== History ==
The club was founded by Haripada Dutta in 1925, and A. L. Corbett, principal of the George Telegraph Institute, became first chairman. They started out on the 4th division of the Calcutta League and after 21 years they were finally promoted to the 1st division of Calcutta Football League beating Rajasthan Athletic Club 3–1. In the same year, they reached the final of the IFA Shield, but due to the anti-British riots the final couldn't be held. Instead of declaring them as joint winners with Mohun Bagan AC, the entire tournament was scrapped. Some of notable Indian footballers including Rajen Ghosh, Monimohan Ghosh, Sheoo Mewalal, Sushil Bhattacharya, Runu Guha Thakurata, Monoranjan Bhattacharya, Satyajit Chatterjee, Aloke Mukherjee, Shasthi Duley, appeared with George Telegraph. Noted Indian football manager Yan Law began his playing career at the club.

They stayed at the top flight for 66 years but in 2002 and 2003, they suffered back-to-back demotions. Then again they got promoted twice in two successive years and since then they have been staying in the top flight. In 2004, they emerged as the runners-up of the All Airlines Gold Cup. In the same year, they reached semi-finals of prestigious Trades Cup. Their first participation in the I-League 2nd Division was in 2009, where they finished 4th, behind Oil India FC and were eliminated in the group stage. Therefore, George Telegraph was unable to qualify for the I-League, then top tier of football in India. In 2013, they again got a chance to play in I-League 2nd Division, which became their second season.

In 2020, the George Telegraph emerged as the runners-up in the prestigious IFA Shield tournament, the third oldest association football tournament in the world, losing to 2–1 to the I-League side Real Kashmir FC. They reached the semi-finals of 2021 CFL Premier Division in November 2021, but their campaign ended with a 1–0 loss to Railway FC.

In June 2023, the Indian Football Association (IFA) announced the merger of both Premier Division A and B of the Calcutta Football League ahead of its 125th edition, in which George Telegraph was placed in Group II.

== Club officials ==
As of 3 July 2020

Personnel

- General secretary: Subrata Dutta
- Joint secretary : Anirban Dutta
- Executive secretary: Adhiraj Dutta
- Team manager: Sabyasachi Sarkar

Coaching and medical staff

- Head coach: Goutam Ghosh
- Assistant coach: Samar Deb
- Goalkeeping coach: Jagadish Ghosh
- Physio: Murtuza Sabuwala

== Honours ==
=== League ===
- CFL Premier Division A
  - Runners-up (1): 1951–52
- CFL Premier Division B
  - Champions (3): 1985, 1990, 2017

=== Cup ===
- IFA Shield
  - Runners-up (1): 2020
- All Airlines Gold Cup
  - Runners-up (1): 2004
- Darjeeling Gold Cup
  - Champions (1): 1977
- Oil India Gold Cup
  - Runners-up (1): 2008–09
- Kohima Royal Gold Cup
  - Runners-up (1): 2004

== Other departments ==
=== Men's cricket ===
The club has its men's cricket section, which is under the jurisdiction of Cricket Association of Bengal (CAB). The team participates in First Division League, J.C. Mukherjee T-20 Trophy and other regional tournaments.

== See also ==
- Football in Kolkata
- List of football clubs in Kolkata
- Calcutta Football League
