= Peerless SC =

Indian football club in Kolkata, India

Peerless
- Full name: Peerless Sports Club
- Short name: PSC
- Founded: 1993; 33 years ago
- Ground: Various
- Owner: Bengal Peerless Housing Devpt
- Chairman: Patit Paban Ray
- Head coach: Hemanta Dora
- League: CFL Premier Division
Home colours	Away colours

Peerless Sports Club (Bengali: পিয়ারলেস স্পোর্টস ক্লাব) (formerly known as Peerless FC), or simply Peerless, is an Indian professional football club based in Kolkata, West Bengal. Founded in 1993, the club is owned by Peerless Group and currently competes in the Calcutta Premier Division A.

The club had refused to take part in the I-League 2nd Division owing to financial matters. After the three Kolkata giants Mohun Bagan, East Bengal and Mohammedan Sporting, Peerless is considered as the strongest side from the city of joy.

== History ==
Peerless as a club began their journey from Kolkata Maidan, the home of Kolkata football. The club is founded in 1993 and owned by its parent organization Peerless Group, a business conglomerate in Kolkata.

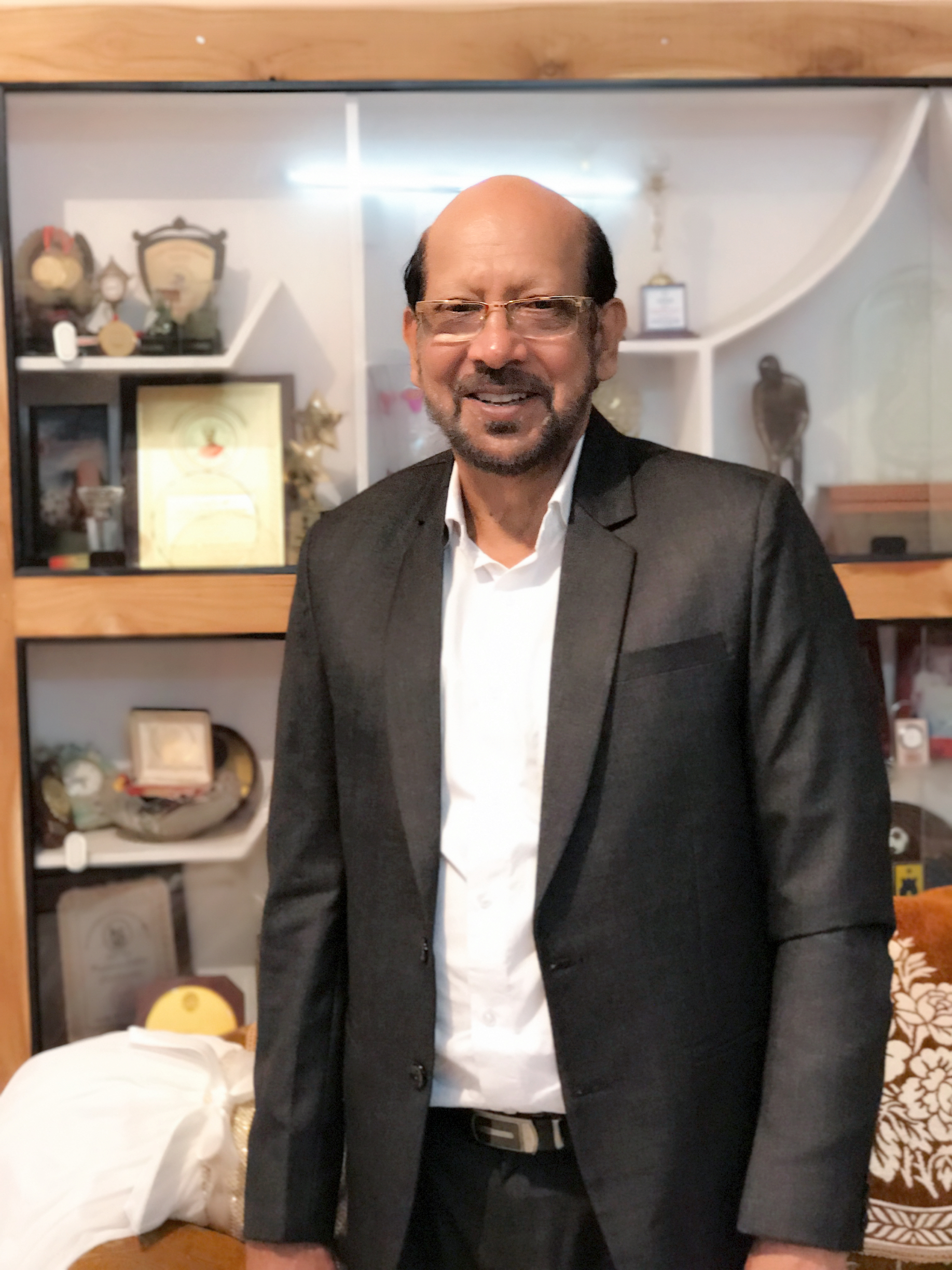
Shabbir Ali was the coach of Peerless during their early seasons.

Earlier in the 90s, the club competed in the Calcutta Premier League second division. Former India international Shabbir Ali was in charge of the club and under his coaching, Peerless promoted itself from the first division to the CFL Super Division in 1993–94 season.

In 2018, the club signed Trinidad and Tobago international Anthony Wolfe ahead of their CFL season. Thus he became the club's first and only footballer who has appeared in the FIFA World Cup. In 2019, Peerless created history after winning the 2019–20 Calcutta Premier Division, defeating their archrivals; three Kolkata giants. The club managed by Jahar Das, emerged as the first club outside the Big three (East Bengal, Mohun Bagan and Mohammedan) to win the Calcutta Football League since 1958. In that season, they reached the quarter-finals of the 2020 IFA Shield.

As defending champion, Peerless began their 2021–22 Calcutta Premier Division journey on 17 August, defeating Kidderpore FC 4–1. They reached the knock-out stages after finishing as Group-B topper but lost 4–0 to Railway FC in the quarter-finals. In June 2022, the club roped in Soren Dutta as head coach and Iranian former footballer Jamshid Nassiri as technical director. In July, they participated in Naihati Gold Cup and their campaign ended with a 0–0 (5–4) defeat to United SC in semi-finals. In September, the club fought in group stages of the Calcutta Premier Division but failed to reach the "super six" round.

In June 2023, the Indian Football Association (IFA) announced the merger of both Premier Division A and B of the Calcutta Football League, ahead of its 125th edition, in which Peerless was allowed to compete in Group I.

== Ownership and finances ==
Peerless Sports Club (formed in 1993) is currently owned by Peerless Group, its major holding company is Peerless General Finance & Investment Co Ltd, which is India's Registered Residuary non-banking Company. It has subsidiaries like Peerless Hospital, Bengal Peerless (real estate), Kaizen Holidays and others.

Patit Paban Ray, a board member of Bengal Peerless Housing Development Co Ltd, is currently the chairman of Peerless Club.

== Stadium ==
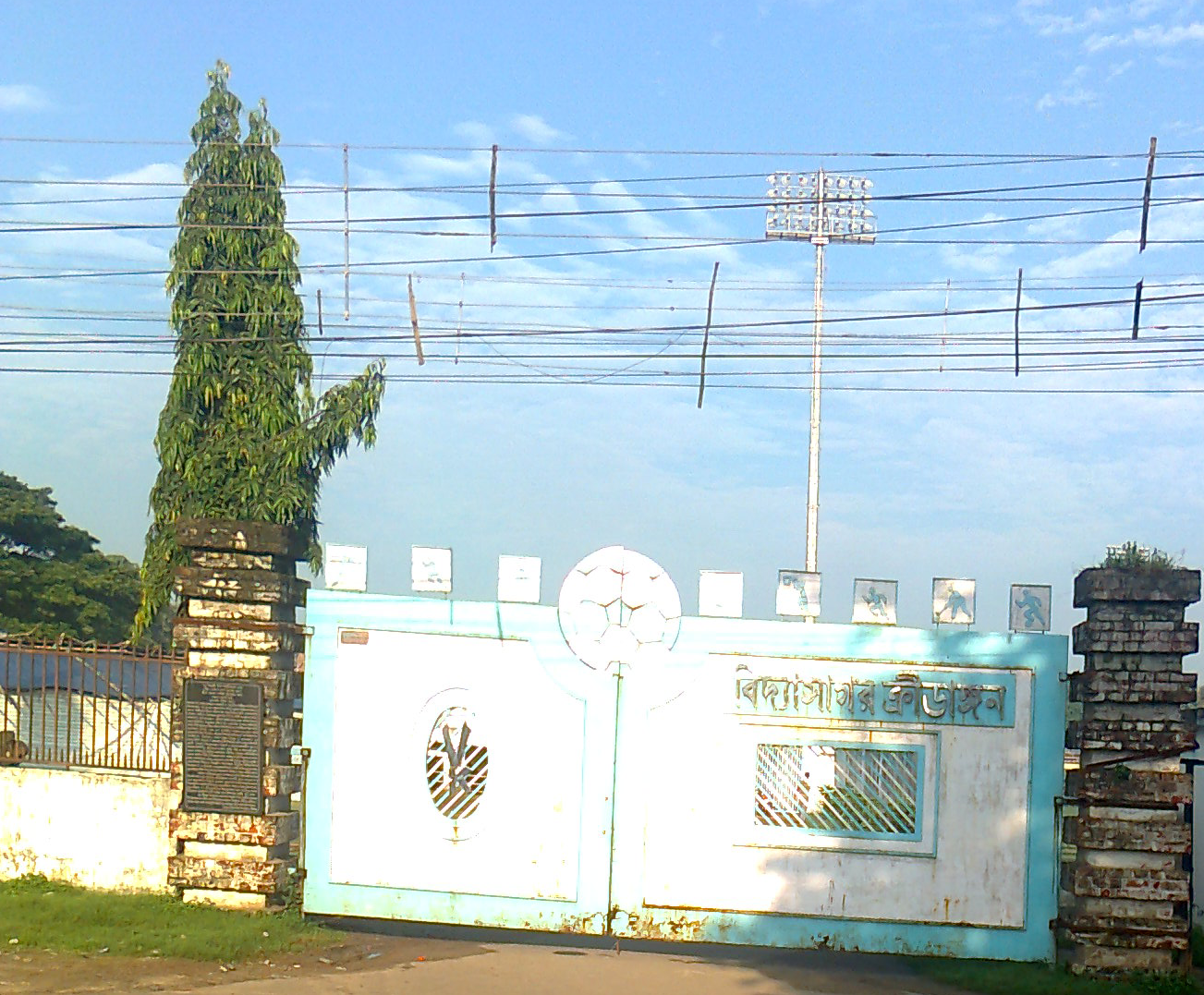
Entrance of the Barasat Vidyasagar Krirangan.

Peerless plays most of their home matches of Calcutta Football League Premier Division A at both the Barasat Stadium and Rabindra Sarobar Stadium.

== Honours ==
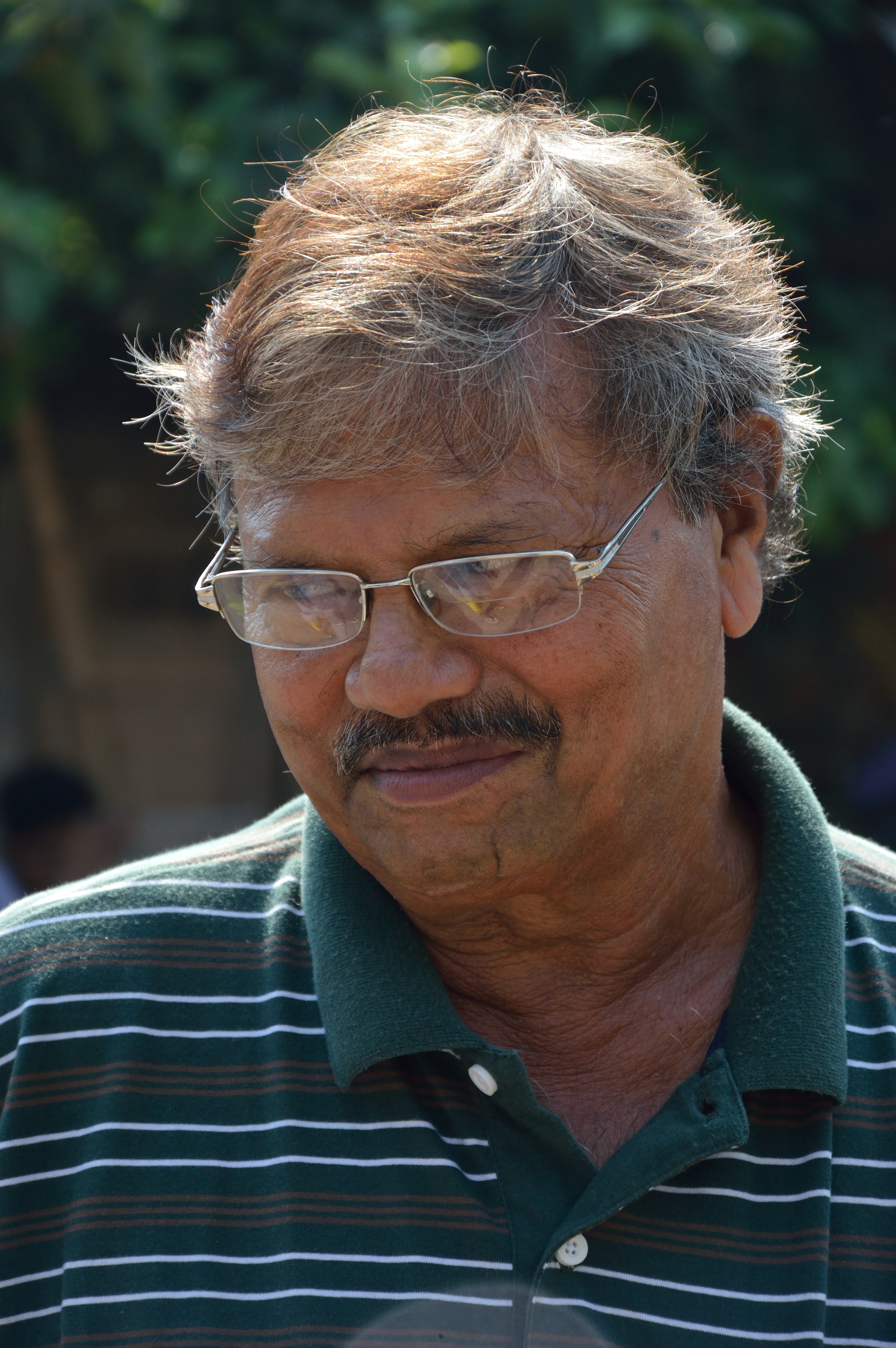
Jahar Das was the manager who led the team to Calcutta Football League victory.

=== League ===
- Calcutta Premier Division A
  - Champions (1): 2019–20
  - Runners-up (1): 2018–19
  - Third place (1): 1996–97
- CFL Second Division
  - Champions (1): 1993

=== Cup ===
- Trades Cup
  - Winners (1): 2006
- All Airlines Gold Cup
  - Runners-up (1): 1998

Peerless SC scripted history in 2020, as they became the only club outside Kolkata's "Big Three" (Mohun Bagan AC, East Bengal FC, and Mohammedan Sporting) to win the Championship in 61 years; Eastern Railway did the same back in 1958.

== Players ==
=== First-team squad ===
As of 27 June 2023

Note: Flags indicate national team as defined under FIFA eligibility rules; some limited exceptions apply. Players may hold more than one non-FIFA nationality.

No.	Pos.	Nation	Player
1	GK	IND	Sanjoy Kumar Bhattacharrya
2	DF	IND	Ksankupar D Khongmalai
3	DF	IND	Sourauv Ram Paul
5	DF	IND	Stephanson Pale
6	DF	IND	Israfil Dewann
7	FW	IND	Dawanshwa Carlos Challam
15	MF	IND	Donborlang Nongkynrih
16	MF	IND	Benjamin Lupheng
17	MF	IND	Donlad Diengdoh
41	FW	IND	Raikutshisha Buam
44	MF	IND	Henry Marvinsson Marboh

No.	Pos.	Nation	Player
12	FW	IND	Wanboklang S Lyngkhoi
20	GK	IND	Shubham Dhas
14	FW	IND	Nikelsson Bina
18	DF	IND	Amit Tudu (captain)
26	MF	IND	Pynshondorlang Shadap
25	DF	IND	Harshaa Parui
24	MF	IND	Sajan Shahhani
35	DF	IND	Mohamed Aftab Alam
36	FW	IND	Manostosh Majji
22	MF	IND	MC Mawsawzuala
37	DF	IND	Indrajit Singh Bedhi

== Notable players ==
For all current and former notable Peerless SC players with a Wikipedia article, see: Peerless SC players.

=== World Cup player ===
- (Trinidad and Tobago) Anthony Wolfe (2018, 2019–2020, 2021–2022)

== Managerial history ==
Name	Nationality	Years	Note
Shabbir Ali	India	1993–1995	
Biswajit Bhattacharya	India	2018–2019	
Jahar Das	India	2019–2021	
Subrata Bhattacharya jr.	India	2021–2022	
Soren Dutta	India	2022–2023	
Hemanta Dora	India	2023–present	

== See also ==
- Calcutta Football League
- Football in Kolkata
- List of football clubs in Kolkata
- List of football clubs in India
