= Eastern Railway FC =

Indian institutional football club

Eastern Railway
- Full name: Eastern Railway Football Club
- Nickname: The Railwaymen
- Short name: ERFC
- Founded: 1882; 144 years ago (as East Bengal Railway Sports Club)
- Ground: Eastern Railway Stadium, Kanchrapara
- Capacity: 5,000
- Owner: Eastern Bengal Railway
- League: CFL 1st Division
Home colours	Away colours

Eastern Railway Football Club (Bengali: ইস্টার্ন রেলওয়ে ফুটবল ক্লাব) (formerly known as both East Bengal Railway FC and Eastern Bengal Railway FC), simply known as Railway Football Club Calcutta, is a football section of the Indian institutional multi-sports club based in Kolkata, West Bengal. The club was incorporated in 1882. Eastern Railway previously achieved more success in the highest division of the Calcutta Football League.

== History ==
=== Foundation and early history ===
Founded as "Eastern Bengal Railway Sports Club" in 1882, Eastern Railway began its journey as the recreational arm of Eastern Bengal Railway, and was operated predominantly by the British railwaymen and officials. In 1890s, they first participated in second division of the Calcutta Football League, and soon emerged as one of the dark horses in the competition, after gaining promotion to first division in 1913. It was a trend that only white-skinned players were allowed to don in club jerseys; Churchill, D'Silva, Joe Galbraith, and Curvy brothers were notable players at that time. In mid-1920s, Indians have been allowed to play in the club.

After becoming fully Indian club, Eastern Railway emerged as one of the strongest sides of the CFL, with players including Jamini Bandyopadhyay, Bechu Dutta, Pakhi Sen, Tulsi Das, Alauddin Khan, Mohini Bandyopadhyay, and later Sahu Mewalal, Santosh Nandy, Ajit Nandy, Neelu Mukhopadhyay, and Karuna Majumder. They reached final of Durand Cup in 1927. The club later appeared in many top national tournaments like the IFA Shield, where they won the then top tournament in 1944. The club later won All-India Railway Championship thrice.

=== Post-independence era ===
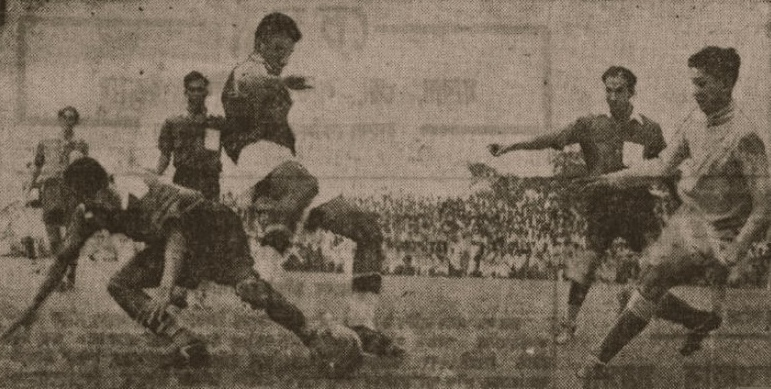
Eastern Railway player Nikhil Nandy (in left) tackling Muhammad Umer during a 1956 Calcutta Football League match between Mohammedan Sporting and Eastern Railway.

After Indian independence in 1947, Eastern Railway managed to reach final of Rovers Cup in 1949 but lost 3–0 to East Bengal in title decider. The club (then known as "East Indian Railway Accounts") later finished as runners-up in DCM Trophy too, twice in 1953 and 1957. In 1958, they again failed clinching title, beaten by Andhra Pradesh Police Club in final of Sait Nagjee Trophy in Kerala.

After multiple runner-up finishes, best ever success achieved by Eastern Railway came into reality in 1958, when they won prestigious Calcutta Football League title under coaching of Bagha Shome, and became the first team outside the "Big Three" of Kolkata to do so. The club later won several nationwide trophies in the late 1950s and 60s, including Madhya Pradesh Gold Cup, Kalinga Cup, Kumar Mangalam Challenge Trophy and others. In 1967, they won Bordoloi Trophy. Club former player and captain P. K. Banerjee managed Eastern Railway in 1971–72, before moving to the Kolkata giants East Bengal as head coach. The club was relegated from the CFL super division in 1985 after gaining thirteenth position.

=== 2000–present ===
In 2002, Eastern Railway toured to Nepal and participated in Birthday Cup, organized by the All Nepal Football Association, in which they reached semi-final. In 2005, the club clinched Trades Cup title with win against Wari AC in final. In 2007, they reached the final of prestigious Trades Cup, but was defeated by then I-League side Chirag United 3–1. Nirmalendu Debnath managed the club in 2010. In 2010s, Kazam Analytics Limited was roped in as club's principal sponsor.

In June 2023, the Indian Football Association (IFA) made an announcement that the merger of both Premier Division A and B of the Calcutta Football League was done ahead of its 125th edition, in which Eastern Railway was allowed to compete in group B. Prasanta Chakraborty managed the club in their first four league matches, until resigning after a 5–1 defeat to East Bengal on 27 July.

== Notable players ==
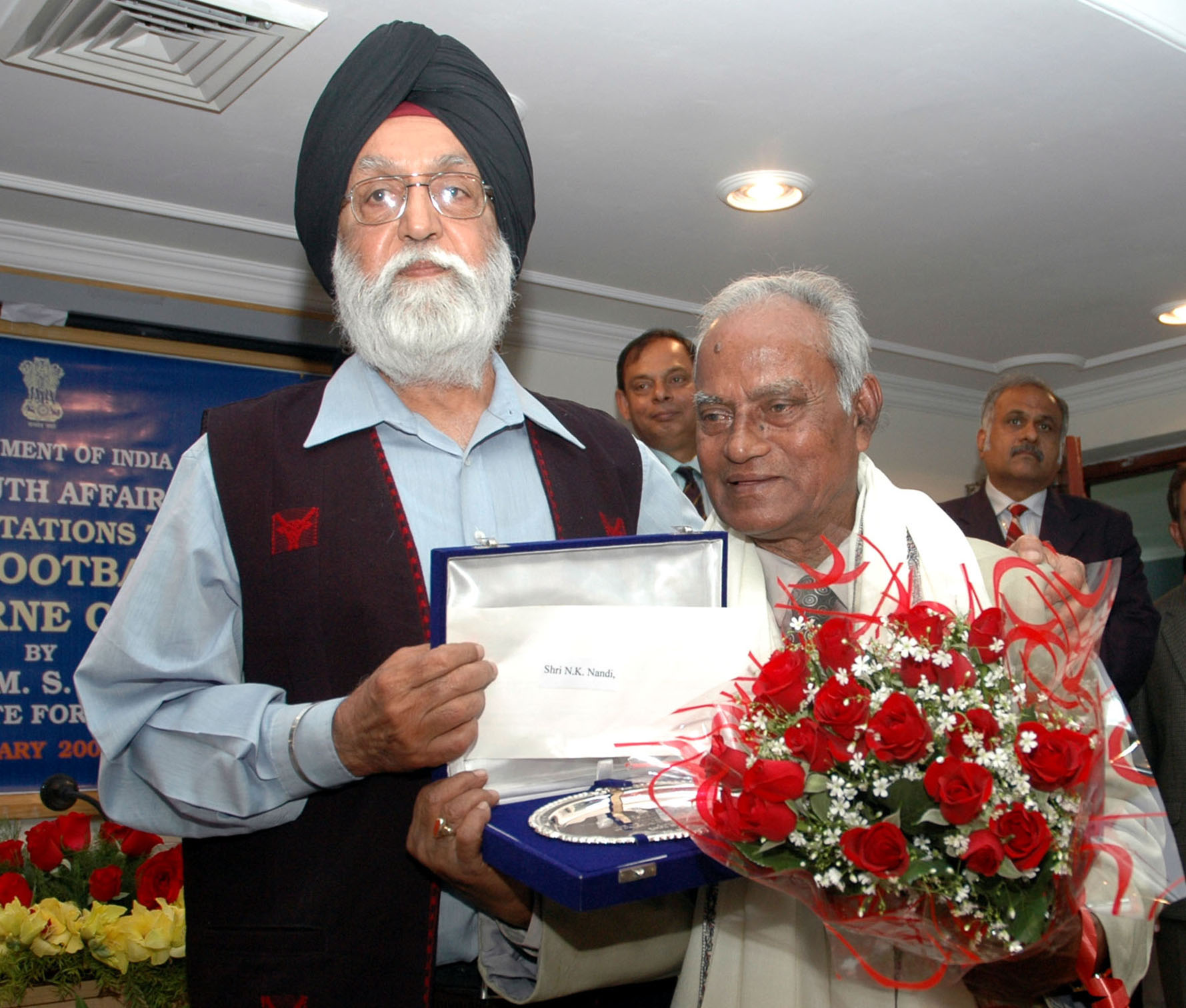
Nikhil Nandy (in right), member of the Eastern Railway's 1958 Calcutta Football League winning team.

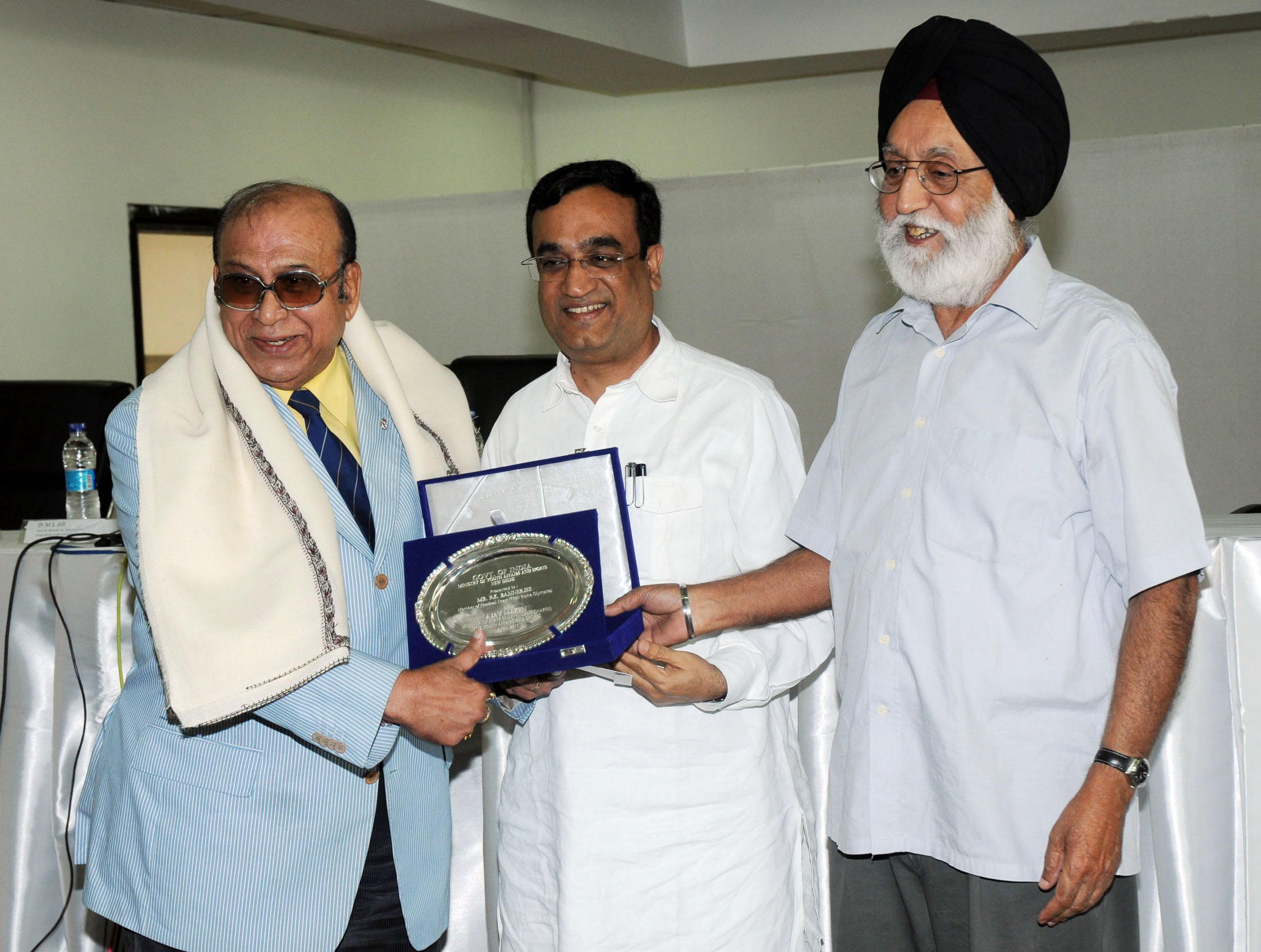
Club legend Pradip Kumar Banerjee (in left), receiving award from the Sports minister of India in 2011.

The club has been represented by many former India members including Syed Abdus Samad, Santosh Nandy, Sahu Mewalal, Sanat Seth, Pradip Kumar Banerjee, Pradyut Barman, Kajal Mukherjee, Parimal Dey, Prasanta Sinha, Nikhil Nandy, Anil Nandy, Prabir Majumdar, and Asim Moulick. Legendary Indian football coach Sushil Bhattacharya played for the club from 1950 to 1956, and later became coach of the team.

Other notable players include N. Majumder and Bimal Kar, who emerged top scorers of the IFA Calcutta Football League representing Eastern Railway in 1939, 1943 and '44 respectively; while Mewalal became top scorer in 1949, '51 and '54.

== Honours ==
=== League ===
- Calcutta Football League
  - Champions (1): 1958

=== Cup ===
International

- (Nepal) Mahendra Gold Cup
  - Runners-up (1): 2004

Domestic

- IFA Shield
  - Champions (1): 1944
  - Runners-up (1): 1957
- Durand Cup
  - Runners-up (1): 1927
- Rovers Cup
  - Runners-up (1): 1949
- DCM Trophy
  - Runners-up (2): 1953, 1957
- Bordoloi Trophy
  - Champions (1): 1967
  - Runners-up (1): 1968
- Sait Nagjee Football Tournament
  - Runners-up (1): 1958
- Trades Cup
  - Champions (3): 1910, 1924, 2005
  - Runners-up (2): 2004, 2007
- Cooch Behar Cup
  - Champions (1): 1930
- Darjeeling Gold Cup
  - Champions (1): 1978
- Mohan Kumar Mangalam Football Tournament
  - Champions (1): 1980
- All-India Inter-Railway Trophy
  - Champions (4): 1994, 1999, 2003–04, 2005
- Vivekananda Gold Cup
  - Champions (1): 2015
- All-India RPF Football Championship
  - Champions (1): 2017

== Other departments ==
=== Field hockey ===
Eastern Railway has its field hockey team that competed in both the prestigious Beighton Cup and Calcutta Hockey League. They clinched Beighton Cup title in 1929. One of the club's famous players is Richard Carr, who represented India at the 1932 Summer Olympics in Los Angeles and won gold medal. Legendary Indian footballer Shanti Mullick appeared with the club's women's hockey team.

Honours

- Beighton Cup
  - Champions (2): 1922, 1929
  - Runners-up (1): 1934
- Calcutta Hockey League
  - Champions (3): 1982, 2017, 2018

=== Cricket ===
In Eastern Railway, men's cricket has been practiced, and it is affiliated with the Cricket Association of Bengal (CAB). It participates in regional tournaments such as First Division League, J.C. Mukherjee T-20 Trophy and P. Sen Memorial Trophy.

=== Volleyball ===
Eastern Railway's volleyball section (consisting both men's and women's teams) participates in the West Bengal State Senior Volleyball Championship and Khelo India Volleyball League. They have won both the 2021 and 2022 editions of the State Senior Volleyball Club Championship.

Honours

- WB State Senior Volleyball Club Championship
  - Champions (2): 2021, 2022

=== Basketball ===
Eastern Railway operates both men's and women's basketball teams.

Honours

- Federation Cup Women's Basketball Championship
  - Champions (1): 2019
- All-India Railway Women's Basketball Championship
  - Champions (3): 2018–19, 2020–21, 2021–22
- All-India Balkar Singh Cheema Memorial Championship
  - Champions (1): 2022–23
- Carmel Trophy Women's Basketball Championship
  - Runners-up (1): 2023

=== Tennis ===
Eastern Railway has tennis department and the club is an affiliated member of the Bengal Tennis Association (BTA).

== See also ==
- Football in Kolkata
- List of football clubs in India
- Railways Sports Promotion Board
- Railways football team
