= Calcutta Football League =

Association football league in India

- Organising body: Indian Football Association (West Bengal)
- Founded: 1898; 128 years ago
- First season: 1898
- Country: India
- Confederation: AFC
- Divisions: 7
- Number of clubs: 26 (Premier Division); 160+ (overall)
- Level on pyramid: 5–11
- Promotion to: Various
- Relegation to: Various
- Domestic cup: IFA Shield
- League cup: Trades Cup
- Current champions: Mohun Bagan SG (31st title, Premier Division) (2026–27)
- Most championships: East Bengal (41 titles, Premier Division)
- Broadcaster(s): No.10 Sports
- Current: 2026 CFL Premier Division

The Calcutta Football League (CFL) is a ladder-based football competition in the Indian state of West Bengal, organised by the Indian Football Association (WB) as part of the state leagues. It is the oldest football league in Asia.

The CFL is divided into CFL Premier Division, CFL 1st Division, CFL 2nd Division, CFL 3rd Division, CFL 4th Division, CFL 5th Division A, and CFL 5th Division B with promotion and relegation between them. CFL has more than 160 mostly Kolkata-based clubs and units. Started in 1898, this league is the oldest football league in Asia and one of the oldest football competitions in the world. CFL currently consists of a seven-tier pyramid system, with more than 8,500 directly registered players of IFA participating in CFL every year, making it one of the biggest leagues in the country.

== History ==
=== Early years (1890s–1910s) ===
In 1898, IFA introduced a two-tiered football league in Calcutta on the lines of English Football League in England and Wales. Until 1937, CFL was a major tournament with participation open to every team across the nation but after the establishment of AIFF, CFL became a regional competition.

The British Indian Army garrison stationed at Fort William played an instrumental role in shaping the Calcutta Football League by putting forth numerous teams alongside other European settlers. The Army teams won all but twelve of the titles until 1933. On eight of those twelve occasions the title was claimed by Calcutta and the rest by Dalhousie. Native teams were barred from participating for the first 15 seasons, and only clubs designated for civil servants, merchants, missionaries and other European nationalities made up the rest of the league, in a clearly designed exercise to exclude Indians of any religion.

In 1914, IFA permitted only two native clubs, Mohun Bagan and Aryan, in the Second Division of CFL. Mohun Bagan had a successful campaign and earned promotion to the Premier Division in their debut season, whereas Aryan was promoted to the top division two years later. From 1917 to 1920, the Second Division was won by two other native clubs, namely Kumortuli Club (in 1917, 1918 and 1919) and Town Club (in 1920), but their promotions were denied due to the allowance of only two native clubs to play in each tier.

=== Uprise of native dominance (1920s–1947) ===
1921 saw the rise of East Bengal who began their CFL journey in the Second Division in place of Tajhat Club who had withdrawn from the league. Three years later East Bengal finished the Second Division as the joint-winners with Cameroons B and since Cameroons A was in the Premier Division, East Bengal got the opportunity for promotion. As two native clubs were already playing in the Premier Division, East Bengal's promotion was to be rejected as well. At this, the club called for amendments and in the following General Meeting of IFA, the nine British teams conveyed their approval, while Mohun Bagan and Aryan opposed it. Eventually the rule regulating the promotion of native clubs was abolished by majority.

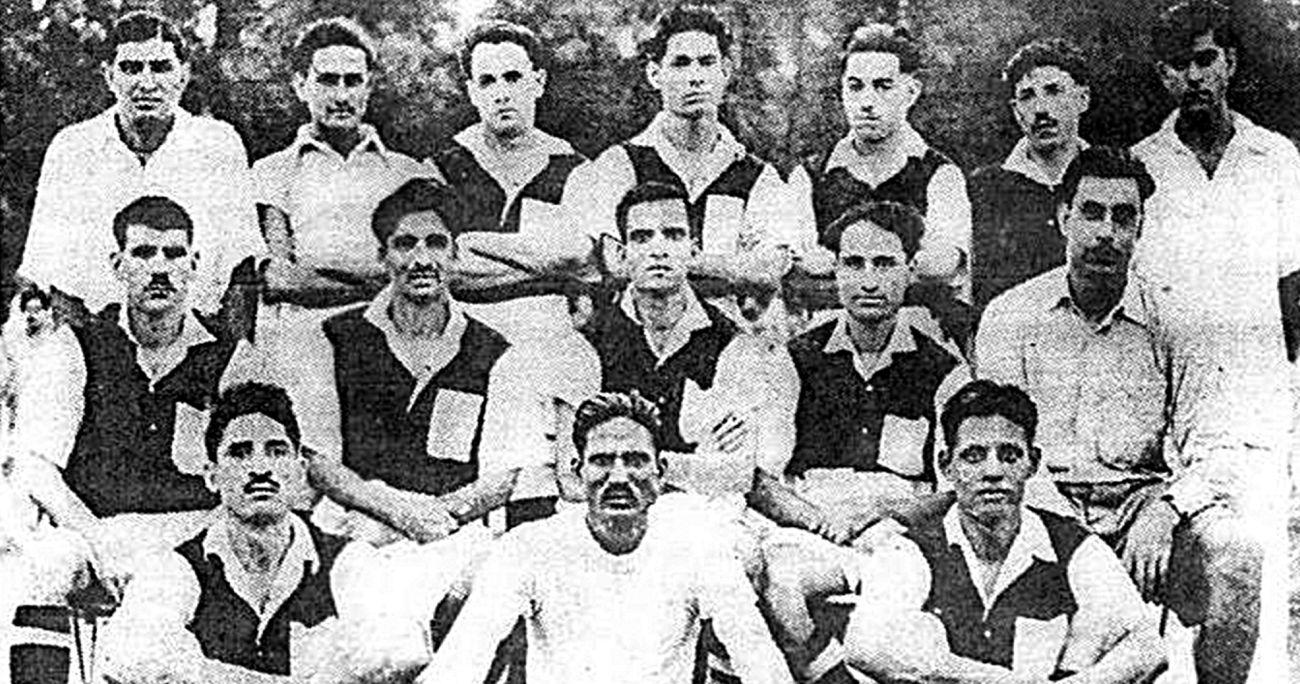
Mohammedan SC, the first native Indian team to win the league.

Even though the native clubs got more opportunities yet the British dominance continued till 1933. In 1934, Mohammedan won the title in their debut season and became the first native club to win CFL. The club went on to win the league six out of seven times from 1935 to 1941, with 1939 being the only exception when they did not participate and Mohun Bagan went away with their first league title that year.

=== Post-independence era (1947–1970s) ===
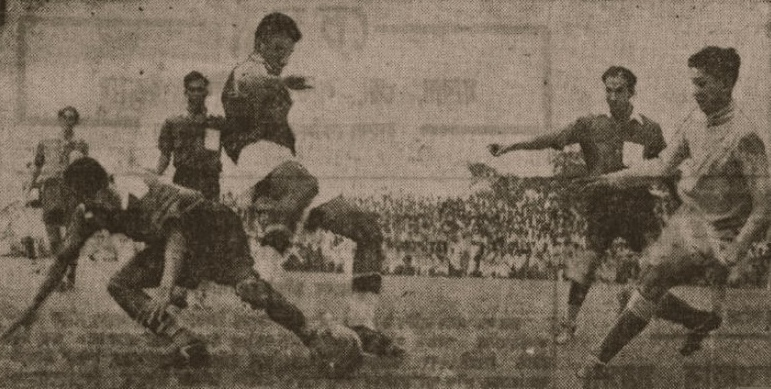
Nikhil Nandy (L) tackling Muhammad Umer during a 1956 Calcutta League match between Mohammedan & Eastern Railway

In the post-independence years, many other state leagues were introduced and various clubs from other states rose in glory, but CFL was still considered to be one of the top leagues in the nation and provided innumerable young talents. The league matches were mostly played in monsoon and matches involving the Big Three of Calcutta (Mohun Bagan, East Bengal and Mohammedan) regularly attracted more than 30,000 spectators. From 1934 to 1981, Eastern Railway was the only club outside of the Big Three to win the title in 1958.

The CFL had a long history of crowd trouble, and the burgeoning fanfare exacerbated it. The rapidly increasing off-the-field rivalry between the respective fans of Mohun Bagan and East Bengal saw one of the darkest days of Indian football when 16 fans lost their lives because of a stampede and rioting during a Kolkata Derby in CFL on 16 August 1980 in Eden Gardens. Since then the day is celebrated every year as the Football Lover's Day.

=== Years of obscurity (1980s–2000s) ===
In the 80s and 90s, the league caught many eyes with the rivalry between the two of Indian football's finest tacticians— P.K. Banerjee and Amal Dutta, besides the decades old rivalry among the Big Three.

Due to the rise in financial demands and steady modernisation of the sport, the league became dominated by the Big Three clubs as the smaller clubs struggled to keep up with their economy. The league saw the beginning of a major downfall with the introduction of NFL (later I-League, and now ISL). The importance of regional competitions decreased as all the top clubs in the state were racing for the national honours. From the later 20th century, Mohammedan eventually lost its stronghold and, Mohun Bagan and East Bengal became the only dominant teams in the league. In the new century, the IFA revamped the competition into a six-tier competition with the seventh tier, called the nursery league, reserved for sub-junior teams. The top tier, Premier Division, was also divided into two groups so as to include more teams.

=== Resurgence (2010s–present) ===
Starting in 2010, East Bengal won a record eight consecutive titles until their arch-rivals Mohun Bagan broke the streak in 2018. In 2018, the league's popularity had a sudden upsurge and recorded more than 15,000 spectators even in matches involving small clubs. Most news reports in the local media reverberated the popular feeling— "The passion of the 70s is back." Small clubs like Peerless and George Telegraph introduced some of the foreign talents that later went on to become big names in the country.

In 2019, Peerless clinched the honour and became the second team outside the Big Three after Eastern Railway to win the league since 1958. Since the independence of India, the CFL was never cancelled until 2020 when after a lengthy delay due to the COVID-19 pandemic it was decided to cancel the then CFL season.

== Structure ==
With the season starting from 2023, the clubs/units were redistributed among the first six divisions and the last division was reserved only for youth teams.

Calcutta Football League
Tier	Division
1 _{(5 on Indian Football pyramid)}	CFL Premier Division _{↑qualify 2 (I-League 3) ↓relegate 2}
2 _{(6 on Indian Football pyramid)}	CFL 1st Division _{↑promote 2 ↓relegate 2}
3 _{(7 on Indian Football pyramid)}	CFL 2nd Division _{↑promote 2 ↓relegate 2}
4 _{(8 on Indian Football pyramid)}	CFL 3rd Division _{↑promote 2 ↓relegate 2}
5 _{(9 on Indian Football pyramid)}	CFL 4th Division _{↑promote 2 ↓relegate 2}
6 _{(10 on Indian Football pyramid)}	CFL 5th Division Group A _{↑promote 2 ↓relegate 2}
7 _{(11 on Indian Football pyramid)}	CFL 5th Division Group B _{↑promote 2}

Starting from 2023, 26 teams participate in the Premier Division, divided into two groups at the same pyramid level and compete in a single-leg round robin tournament. The top three teams in each 13-team group will compete in a single-leg round robin tournament and the group leaders will be declared the champions. The top two teams, not already in the ISL or I-League are promoted to the I-League 3. The bottom three teams in each 13-team group also compete in a separate single-leg round robin tournament and the bottom four teams are relegated to the First Division.

Apart from the Premier Division A, most other divisions are competed by about 20 teams, and the format of the tournaments in the lower divisions isn't always the same. The top teams in respective divisions are promoted to the division higher to it and the bottom teams get relegated to the lower one.

The most successful clubs participating in the top-tier of the league includes East Bengal, Mohun Bagan and Mohammedan. However, since 1982, the league has been won by either East Bengal or Mohun Bagan until 2019 when Peerless made history by winning their maiden league title and becoming the first team outside the Kolkata's Big Three to win the league after a gap of 61 years since Eastern Railway had won.

== CFL Premier Division ==
CFL Premier Division সিএফএল প্রিমিয়ার ডিভিশন
- Organising bodies: Indian Football Association
- Country: India
- Number of clubs: 26
- Level on pyramid: 5
- Promotion to: I-League 3
- Relegation to: CFL 1st Division
- Current champions: East Bengal (41st title)
- Current: 2026 CFL Premier Division

CFL Premier Division is the top-tier state level football league in the Indian state of West Bengal.

Season	Champions
—N/a	See below for details

== CFL 1st Division ==
CFL 1st Division সিএফএল ১ম বিভাগ
- Organising bodies: Indian Football Association
- Country: India
- Number of clubs: 26
- Level on pyramid: 6
- Promotion to: CFL Premier Division
- Relegation to: CFL 2nd Division
- Current champions: Mohunbagan (2026)

CFL 1st Division is the 2nd tier state level football league in the Indian state of West Bengal.

Format (2024–25): Twenty-six teams are divided into two groups in the first phase, where each plays twelve matches in round robin format. Top three teams from the two groups shall proceed to the championship round, where each play five more matches to determine the champion. The bottom two teams from both groups play the relegation round. Top two teams of Championship round are promoted into "CFL Premier Division", and last two teams of relegation round are relegated into "CFL 2nd Division".

Season	Champions	Ref.
2019	Police AC	
2022	Army Red	
2023	New Alipore Suruchi Sangha	
2024	United Kolkata SC	
2025	Coal India WB	
2026	Mohunbagan	

== CFL 2nd Division ==
CFL 2nd Division সিএফএল ২য় বিভাগ
- Organising bodies: Indian Football Association
- Country: India
- Number of clubs: 16
- Level on pyramid: 7
- Promotion to: CFL 1st Division
- Relegation to: CFL 3rd Division
- Current champions: Adamas United Sports Academy (2023)

CFL 2nd Division is the 3rd tier state level football league in the Indian state of West Bengal.

Format (2024–25): Sixteen teams are playing single round robin league format. Top two teams are promoted into CFL 1st Division, and last two are relegated into CFL 3rd Division.

Season	Champions	Ref.
2023	Adamas United Sports Academy	

== CFL 3rd Division ==
CFL 3rd Division সিএফএল ৩য় বিভাগ
- Organising bodies: Indian Football Association
- Country: India
- Level on pyramid: 8
- Promotion to: CFL 2nd Division
- Relegation to: CFL 4th Division
- Current champions: Southern Athletic Club (2023)

CFL 3rd Division is the 4th tier state level football league in the Indian state of West Bengal.

Season	Champions	Ref.
2023	Southern Athletic Club	

== CFL 4th Division ==
CFL 4th Division সিএফএল ৪র্থ বিভাগ
- Organising bodies: Indian Football Association
- Country: India
- Level on pyramid: 9
- Promotion to: CFL 3rd Division
- Relegation to: CFL 5th Division Group A
- Current champions: Shyambazar United Club (2023)

CFL 4th Division is the 5th tier state level football league in the Indian state of West Bengal.

Season	Champions	Ref.
2023	Shyambazar United Club	

== CFL 5th Division Group A ==
CFL 5th Division Group A সিএফএল ৫ম বিভাগ গ্রুপ এ
- Organising bodies: Indian Football Association
- Country: India
- Number of clubs: 35
- Level on pyramid: 10
- Promotion to: CFL 4th Division
- Relegation to: CFL 5th Division Group B
- Current champions: Ariadaha Sporting Club (2023)

CFL 5th Division Group A is the 6th tier state level football league in the Indian state of West Bengal.

Format (2024–25): Thirty five teams are divided into four groups. Eight teams are promoted to CFL 4th Division and six teams are relegated to CFL 5th Division Group B.

Season	Champions	Ref.
2023	Ariadaha Sporting Club	

== CFL 5th Division Group B ==
CFL 5th Division Group B সিএফএল ৫ম বিভাগ গ্রুপ বি
- Organising bodies: Indian Football Association
- Country: India
- Number of clubs: 18
- Level on pyramid: 11
- Promotion to: CFL 5th Division Group A
- Current champions: Beleghata Balak Brindo (2023)

CFL 5th Division Group B is the 7th tier state level football league in the Indian state of West Bengal.

Format (2024–25): Eighteen teams are divided in two groups of nine, with each team playing other in the group once. Top three teams of two groups proceed to the Super Six round. Top four teams are promoted in CFL 5th Division Group A.

Season	Champions	Ref.
2023	Beleghata Balak Brindo	

== Sponsorship ==
Period	Sponsor	Tournament name
1898–2004	None	Calcutta Football League
2005–2014	Sahara India	Sahara Calcutta Premier League
2015–2020	Officer's Choice Blue	Officer's Choice Blue Calcutta Premier League
2021–2023	Sister Nivedita University	SNU Calcutta Football League
2024–2025	Shrachi Group	Calcutta Football League
2026–present	Style Bazaar	Style Bazaar Calcutta Football League

== Media coverage ==
Period	Broadcaster
1898–2004	N/A
2005	Tara Newz
2006	Kolkata TV
2007	Zee 24 Ghanta
2008	ABP Ananda
2009–2011	News Time
2012	Zee 24 Ghanta
2013–2015	Jalsha Movies
2016	News18 Bangla
2017	Kolkata TV
2018–2021	Sadhna News
2022–2023	InSports TV (streaming)
2024	Zee 24 Ghanta
2024–2025	SSEN (streaming)
2026–	No.10 Sports (streaming)

== Champions of the top-most division ==
=== By year ===
==== Pre-independence era (1898–1947) ====
Year	Winner	Note
1898	(United Kingdom) Gloucestershire Regiment	
1899	(British Raj) Calcutta FC	
1900	(United Kingdom) Royal Irish Rifles	
1901	(United Kingdom) Royal Irish Rifles	
1902	(United Kingdom) King's Own Scottish Borderers	
1903	(United Kingdom) Sutherland Highlanders	
1904	(United Kingdom) King's Own Regiment	
1905	(United Kingdom) King's Own Regiment	
1906	(United Kingdom) Highlander Light Infantry	
1907	(British Raj) Calcutta FC	
1908	(United Kingdom) Gordon Light Infantry	
1909	(United Kingdom) Gordon Light Infantry	
1910	(British Raj) Dalhousie	
1911	(United Kingdom) 70th Company Royal Garrison Artillery	
1912	(United Kingdom) Black Watch	
1913	(United Kingdom) Black Watch	
1914	(United Kingdom) Argyllshire Highlanders	
1915	(United Kingdom) 10th Middlesex Regiment	
1916	(British Raj) Calcutta FC	
1917	(United Kingdom) Royal Lincolnshire Regiment	
1918	(British Raj) Calcutta FC	
1919	(United Kingdom) 12th Special Service Battalion	
1920	(British Raj) Calcutta FC	
1921	(British Raj) Dalhousie	
1922	(British Raj) Calcutta FC	
1923	(British Raj) Calcutta FC	
1924	(United Kingdom) Queen's Own Cameron Highlanders	
1925	(British Raj) Calcutta FC	
1926	(United Kingdom) North Staffordshire Regiment	
1927	(United Kingdom) North Staffordshire Regiment	
1928	(British Raj) Dalhousie	
1929	(British Raj) Dalhousie	
1930	None	Cancelled due to nationwide Satyagraha movement.
1931	(United Kingdom) Durham Light Infantry	
1932	(United Kingdom) Durham Light Infantry	
1933	(United Kingdom) Durham Light Infantry	
1934	(British Raj) Mohammedan	First all-Indian club to win the league.
1935	(British Raj) Mohammedan	
1936	(British Raj) Mohammedan	
1937	(British Raj) Mohammedan	
1938	(British Raj) Mohammedan	
1939	(British Raj) Mohun Bagan	
1940	(British Raj) Mohammedan	
1941	(British Raj) Mohammedan	
1942	(British Raj) East Bengal	
1943	(British Raj) Mohun Bagan	
1944	(British Raj) Mohun Bagan	
1945	(British Raj) East Bengal	
1946	(British Raj) East Bengal	
1947	None	Cancelled due to Indian independence movement.
Source: IFA (WB)

==== Post-independence era (1947–present) ====
Year	Winner	Note
1948	Mohammedan	
1949	East Bengal	
1950	East Bengal	
1951	Mohun Bagan	
1952	East Bengal	
1953	None	Abandoned midway due to riots in Calcutta.
1954	Mohun Bagan	
1955	Mohun Bagan	
1956	Mohun Bagan	
1957	Mohammedan	
1958	Eastern Railway	
1959	Mohun Bagan	
1960	Mohun Bagan	
1961	East Bengal	
1962	Mohun Bagan	
1963	Mohun Bagan	
1964	Mohun Bagan	
1965	Mohun Bagan	
1966	East Bengal	
1967	Mohammedan	
1968	None	Mohun Bagan had won the league but due to an injunction from the Calcutta High Court, the league was declared null and void.
1969	Mohun Bagan	
1970	East Bengal	
1971	East Bengal	
1972	East Bengal	East Bengal didn't concede a goal in the tournament.
1973	East Bengal	
1974	East Bengal	
1975	East Bengal	
1976	Mohun Bagan	
1977	East Bengal	East Bengal had won every match in the tournament.
1978	Mohun Bagan	
1979	Mohun Bagan	
1980	None	Called off due to stampede and riot in Eden Gardens on August 16.
1981	Mohammedan	
1982	East Bengal	
1983	Mohun Bagan	
1984	Mohun Bagan	
1985	East Bengal	
1986	Mohun Bagan	
1987	East Bengal	
1988	East Bengal	
1989	East Bengal	
1990	Mohun Bagan	
1991	East Bengal	
1992	Mohun Bagan	
1993	East Bengal	
1994	Mohun Bagan	
1995	East Bengal	
1996	East Bengal	
1997	Mohun Bagan	
1998	East Bengal	
1999	East Bengal	
2000	East Bengal	
2001	Mohun Bagan	
2002	East Bengal	
2003	East Bengal	
2004	East Bengal	
2005	Mohun Bagan	
2006	East Bengal	
2007	Mohun Bagan	
2008	Mohun Bagan	
2009	Mohun Bagan	
2010	East Bengal	
2011	East Bengal	
2012	East Bengal	
2013	East Bengal	
2014	East Bengal	
2015	East Bengal	
2016	East Bengal	East Bengal had won every match in the tournament.
2017	East Bengal	
2018	Mohun Bagan	
2019	Peerless	
2020	None	Cancelled due to COVID-19 pandemic in India.
2021	Mohammedan	
2022	Mohammedan	
2023	Mohammedan	
2024/25	East Bengal	
2025	East Bengal	
2026	Mohun Bagan	
Source: IFA (WB)

=== By team ===
The list only contains the names of the teams that have won the top-most division of the Calcutta Football League more than once.

Club	Titles	Winning years
East Bengal	41	1942, 1945, 1946, 1949, 1950, 1952, 1961, 1966, 1970, 1971, 1972, 1973, 1974, 1975, 1977, 1982, 1985, 1987, 1988, 1989, 1991, 1993, 1995, 1996, 1998, 1999, 2000, 2002, 2003, 2004, 2006, 2010, 2011, 2012, 2013, 2014, 2015, 2016, 2017, 2024/25, 2025
Mohun Bagan	31	1939, 1943, 1944, 1951, 1954, 1955, 1956, 1959, 1960, 1962, 1963, 1964, 1965, 1969, 1976, 1978, 1979, 1983, 1984, 1986, 1990, 1992, 1994, 1997, 2001, 2005, 2007, 2008, 2009, 2018, 2026
Mohammedan	14	1934, 1935, 1936, 1937, 1938, 1940, 1941, 1948, 1957, 1967, 1981, 2021, 2022, 2023
Calcutta FC	8	1899, 1907, 1916, 1918, 1920, 1922, 1923, 1925
Dalhousie	4	1910, 1921, 1928, 1929
(United Kingdom) Durham Light Infantry	3	1931, 1932, 1933
(United Kingdom) Black Watch	2	1912, 1913
(United Kingdom) Gordon Light Infantry	2	1908, 1909
(United Kingdom) King's Own Regiment	2	1904, 1905
(United Kingdom) North Staffordshire Regiment	2	1926, 1927
(United Kingdom) Royal Irish Rifles	2	1900, 1901

== See also ==
- Bengal Super League
- Premier League Soccer
- Football in West Bengal
- Football in Kolkata
