= 2017–18 East Bengal FC season =

Indian football club season

East Bengal
2017–18 season
- President: Dr Pranab Dasgupta
- Head-Coach: (India) Khalid Jamil
- Stadium: Salt Lake Stadium; Barasat Stadium; East Bengal Ground
- I-League: 4th
- Calcutta Football League: Champions
- Super Cup: Runners-Up
- Top goalscorer: League: Dudu Omagbemi (8); All: Dudu Omagbemi (9)
- Highest home attendance: 52,951 vs Mohun Bagan (21.01.2018)
- Lowest home attendance: 8,692 vs Indian Arrows (04.02.2018)
- Average home league attendance: 17,366
- Biggest win: East Bengal 7–1 Chennai City (2017–18 I-League)
Home colours	Away colours	Third colours

The 2017–18 season is East Bengal FC's 98th season in existence. The club has won the Calcutta Football League this season for the record consecutive 8th time. The Red and Gold Brigade finished 4th in the much-awaited 2017–18 I League campaign, coming ever so close once again. East Bengal reached the final of the inaugural Indian Super Cup being held at Bhubaneshwar but lost to Bengaluru FC by 4–1.

== Preseason overview ==
The club roped in I League winning coach Khalid Jamil as their head coach from Aizawl FC and physio Djair Miranda Garcia from arch-rivals Mohun Bagan who was pivotal to Mohun Bagan's success in recent years. East Bengal retained their star striker Willis Deon Plaza and brought in I League winning Midfielder Mahmoud Amnah from Aizawl FC. East Bengal also roped in 3 more players from Aizawl FC, wingers Brandon Vanlalremdika, Laldanmawia Ralte and Left Back Lalramchullova. The Red and Gold Brigade are hoping to seal the Calcutta Football League championship and set an octa-title record of winning it for the 8th consecutive year.
East Bengal also roped in the star midfielder Katsumi Yusa from their arch-rivals Mohun Bagan who would be playing in the I League after 4 seasons playing for the Green and Maroons.

== Team ==
=== First-team squad ===
No.	Name	Nationality	Position	Date of Birth (Age)
Goalkeepers
1	Ubaid CK	(India)	GK	3 March 1990 (age 36)
12	Luis Barreto	(India)	GK	14 October 1980 (age 46)
31	Dibyendu Sarkar	(India)	GK	3 October 1986 (age 40)
32	Mirshad Michu	(India)	GK	3 February 1994 (age 32)
Defenders
3	Arnab Mondal (captain)	(India)	CB	25 September 1989 (age 37)
4	Lalramchullova	(India)	RB/LB	14 January 1996 (age 30)
14	Eduardo Ferreira	(Equatorial Guinea)	CB	8 October 1983 (age 43)
16	Gurwinder Singh	(India)	CB	16 April 1986 (age 40)
18	Mehtab Singh	(India)	RB	5 June 1998 (age 28)
23	Kanishka Mazumdar	(India)	CB	—
24	Salam Ranjan Singh	(India)	RB/LB/CB	4 December 1995 (age 30)
25	Samad Ali Mallick	(India)	RB	30 September 1994 (age 32)
29	Deepak Kumar	(India)	LB	17 January 1994 (age 32)
37	Rahul Ghosh	(India)	LB	13 September 1998 (age 28)
Midfielders
5	Khalid Aucho	(Uganda)	CDM	8 August 1993 (age 33)
6	Mahmoud Amnah	(Syria)	CM/AM	3 January 1983 (age 43)
7	Cavin Lobo (vice-captain)	(India)	CM/AM	4 April 1988 (age 38)
8	Mohammed Rafique	(India)	CM	26 March 1991 (age 35)
10	Katsumi Yusa	(Japan)	AM/LW/RW	2 August 1988 (age 38)
11	Gabriel Fernandes	(India)	RW/AM	22 April 1988 (age 38)
17	Laldanmawia Ralte	(India)	RW	19 December 1992 (age 33)
21	Surabuddin Mollick	(India)	RW	4 May 1990 (age 36)
27	Nikhil Poojari	(India)	RW	3 September 1995 (age 31)
30	Brandon Vanlalremdika	(India)	LW	28 January 1994 (age 32)
35	Yami Longvah	(India)	LW	15 May 1998 (age 28)
38	Prakash Sarkar	(India)	CDM/RB	15 February 1997 (age 29)
40	Ansumana Kromah	(Liberia)	CAM	26 March 1992 (age 34)
Forwards
44	Dudu Omagbemi	(Nigeria)	FW	18 July 1985 (age 41)
19	V P Suhair	(India)	FW	27 July 1992 (age 34)
22	Jobi Justin	(India)	FW	10 November 1993 (age 33)

Last updated: 28 January 2018
Source: East Bengal First team

=== Technical staff ===
Position	Name
Coach	(India) Khalid Jamil
Technical director	(India) Subhash Bhowmick
Goalkeeper coach	(India) Abdul Siddiqui
Physical Trainer	(Brazil) Djair Miranda Garcia
Manager	(India) Monoranjan Bhattacharya
Assistant coach	(India) Ranjan Chowdhury
Club Doctor	(India) Dr. Shantiranjan Dasgupta
Team Media Officer	(India) Gautam Roy
Team Observer	(India) Tushar Rakshit

== Transfers ==
=== Players retained ===
No.	Pos.	Name
31	GK	(India) Dibyendu Sarkar
12	GK	(India) Luis Barreto
3	DF	(India) Arnab Mondal
16	DF	(India) Gurwinder Singh
18	DF	(India) Mehtab Singh
25	DF	(India) Samad Ali Mallick
26	DF	(India) Koushik Sarkar
8	MF	(India) Mohammed Rafique
7	MF	(India) Cavin Lobo
27	MF	(India) Nikhil Poojari
9	FW	(Trinidad and Tobago) Willis Deon Plaza

=== Transfers in ===
No.	Pos.	Name	Previous Team	Month
5	DF	(Trinidad and Tobago) Carlyle Mitchell	San Juan Jabloteh F.C.	August
24	DF	(India) Salam Ranjan Singh	Bengaluru FC	August
6	MF	(Syria) Mahmoud Amnah	Aizawl FC	August
17	MF	(India) Laldanmawia Ralte	Aizawl FC	August
30	MF	(India) Brandon Vanlalremdika	Aizawl FC	August
4	DF	(India) Lalramchullova	Aizawl FC	August
11	MF	(India) Gabriel Fernandes	Churchill Brothers	August
20	MF	(India) Richard Costa	Churchill Brothers	August
21	MF	(India) Surabuddin Mollick	Churchill Brothers	August
23	DF	(India) Tanmoy Ghosh	Mohun Bagan	August
14	DF	(Equatorial Guinea) Eduardo Ferreira	Mohun Bagan	October
10	MF	(Japan) Katsumi Yusa	Mohun Bagan	October
13	MF	(Ivory Coast) Armand Bazie	Rainbow FC	October
15	FW	(Brazil) Charles Do Vale De Souza	Chennai City F.C.	October
44	FW	(Nigeria) Dudu Omagbemi	Chennaiyin FC	January
40	MF	(Liberia) Ansumana Kromah	Mohun Bagan	January
5	MF	(Uganda) Khalid Aucho	OFK Beograd	February

=== Loaned out ===
No.	Pos.	Name	Loaned To	Till
26	DF	(India) Koushik Sarkar	Kenkre F.C.	End of Season

=== Released ===
No.	Pos.	Name	Month	Remarks
5	DF	(Trinidad and Tobago) Carlyle Mitchell	October	Carlyle Mitchell suffered an injury which would make him sit out for rest of the season.
20	MF	(India) Richard Costa	January	Richard Costa was released by East Bengal. He joined Churchill Brothers.
15	FW	(Brazil) Charles	January	Charles was released by East Bengal for poor performance. He was replaced by Dudu Omagbemi.
9	FW	(Trinidad and Tobago) Willis Plaza	January	Willis Plaza was released by East Bengal after the 2nd Kolkata Derby for his poor performances. He joined Churchill Brothers.
13	MF	(Ivory Coast) Bazie Armand	January	Bazie Armand was released by East Bengal for his poor performances. He joined Minerva Punjab F.C. for the rest of the season.

== Season overview ==
=== August ===
The 7 times defending champions started the Calcutta Football League campaign in style as they defeated the newly promoted side Rainbow FC 4–1 with V P Suhair scoring a hat-trick on his debut, thus becoming the 4th East Bengal player after Ashim Moulick (1963), Shyam Thapa (1966) and Bikash Narzinary (2010) to score a hat-trick on debut. Surabuddin Mollick scored the second hat-trick of the season for East Bengal as he came in from the bench to net 3 against Peerless FC in the second half.

=== September ===
East Bengal drew 2–2 against Mohammedan Sporting at Kalyani Stadium in the Mini Derby. Willis Plaza scored the third hat-trick for the season for East Bengal when he took on Tollygunge Agragami just before the big Derby. Maintaining their undefeated streak, East Bengal went on to win the league to win the Calcutta Football League for a record consecutive 8 times, bettering their own record of 1970–75. Mohun Bagan drew 2–2 in the derby which helped East Bengal secure their 8th consecutive league win via Goal Difference as both teams were on 23 points from 9 games.
East Bengal was crowned champions for a record 39th time.

=== October ===
Following the win in the Calcutta Football League, East Bengal decided to play few Pre Season Friendlies against ISL teams. East Bengal would play against Bengaluru FC, FC Pune City, FC Goa and Jamshedpur FC.

East Bengal also roped in defensive midfielder Armand Bazzie from Rainbow FC after impressing coach Khalid Jamil in trails. Carlyle Mitchell had to be released as he sustained an injury which would keep him out of action for the rest of the season. Former Mohun Bagan defender Eduardo Ferreira was brought in as the replacement.

=== November ===
East Bengal drew 1–1 against Bengaluru FC in the first preseason game while lost 3–1 in the second match against the same opponents. FC Pune City won the 3rd preseason game by a close margin 2–1. East Bengal came back in style as they won the next two preseason games, 2–1 against FC Goa and 3–1 against Jamshedpur FC. Armand Bazzie gained a lot of praise in the preseason games, while Mahmoud Amnah and Katsumi Yusa formed a formidable pair which is providing hopes for Red and Gold fans for the upcoming I League, which East Bengal has not won since 2004.
East Bengal started off the I League campaign with a 2–2 draw against the defending champions Aizawl FC. East Bengal squandered a 2-goal lead scored by Eduardo Ferreira and Katsumi Yusa to get equalized in the dying seconds of the match. Next up they face their arch-rivals in the first I League Kolkata Derby of the season, when they face Mohun Bagan on 3 December at the Salt Lake Stadium.

=== December ===
East Bengal lost the first I League Kolkata Derby of the season by a 1–0 margin after Mohun Bagan defender Eze Kingsley scored the solitary goal in the 39th minute from a Sony Norde corner. East Bengal fought hard in the second half but could not break the Mohun Bagan defence. This is one of the worst starts to East Bengal's I League campaign in recent years.
East Bengal faced Shillong Lajong FC at Barasat Stadium on 9 December next. East Bengal thumped Shillong Lajong to a 5–1 victory with a brace from ex Aizawl FC man Laldanmawia Ralte and one each Mahmoud Amnah, Eduardo Ferreira and Katsumi Yusa. Lajong captain Samuel Lalmuanpuia scored the consolation goal for them.
East Bengal faced Churchill Brothers at Barasat Stadium on 16 December next where in a crunch game East Bengal snatched the 3 points in the dying minute of the game when Willis Plaza scored a header from a Katsumi Yusa corner to make it 3–2 for East Bengal. Plaza netted a brace while assisted one for Laldanmawia Ralte who scored his 3rd goal for the campaign.
East Bengal faced Chennai City FC on 22 December away at Coimbatore next where in tough conditions East Bengal managed to win their first away game of the season by a margin of 2–1. Katsumi Yusa opened the scoring while Charles put in the second for them. East Bengal now sit at the second spot in the league with 10 points from 5 games.
East Bengal faced Gokulam Kerala FC at Salt Lake Stadium on 27 December next and in a disarrayed game in a chilly Kolkata winter evening, East Bengal managed a 1–0 win courtesy of a Mohammed Rafique screamer from 25 yards out in the 44th minute. East Bengal managed to grab hold of the lead which earned them important 3 points and took them to the top of the table via goal difference to Minerva Punjab FC who lost earlier the same day.
East Bengal faced NEROCA FC away at Imphal on 30 December next where in tough away conditions East Bengal managed to get a point after conceding a late equalizer in the 89th minute. Katsumi Yusa put East Bengal ahead in the 12rh minute, however Willis Plaza pulled his hamstring in the 40th minute which made East Bengal to play defensive and hence conceded the late equalizer. East Bengal end the calendar year 2017 on Top of the League Table.

=== January ===
East Bengal faced Indian Arrows away at Delhi on 2 January next and fielded a squad without start man Willis Plaza who carried an injury from the last game against NEROCA FC. Young Jobi Justin started in place of Willis Plaza. East Bengal managed to get an early lead when Mahmoud Amnah scored from a free kick in the 13th minute. Katsumi Yusa doubled the lead in the 16th minute after receiving a ball from Amnah from the right. East Bengal managed to hold onto a 2–0 lead and came out with important 3 points from a tough away game. East Bengal now sit on top of the league table with 17 points from 8 games.
East Bengal faced Churchill Brothers away at Tilak Maidan in Goa on 8 January next and dropped 2 valuable points after drawing 1–1 against the bottom-placed side in the league table. East Bengal went ahead with a terrific header by young Jobi Justin from a Laldanmawia Ralte cross from the right. East Bengal were leading the proceedings in the match when suddenly from a counter-attack Churchill's new signing Mechac Koffi scored a blinder from outside the box. East Bengal now has 18 points from 9 games with 9 more games to go.
East Bengal released their foreign import Charles after a series of poor performances by the Brazilian. He was replaced by Dudu Omagbemi who joined for his second stint for the Red and Golds after 2014–15 Season where he scored 20 goals for East Bengal in all competitions.
East Bengal faced Aizawl FC away at Rajiv Gandhi Stadium in Aizawl on 16 January next wherein tough altitude conditions East Bengal managed a goalless draw against the defending champions. A lack-luster display from the Red and Golds along with poor attacking cost East Bengal vital 2 points before the return Kolkata Derby of the I League, which also meant East Bengal now trail by 6 points to League leaders Minerva Punjab FC with 8 more matches to go.
East Bengal faced Mohun Bagan for the second Kolkata Derby of the I League on 21 January at the Salt Lake Stadium next and lost by a 2–0 margin with Dipanda Dicka netting a brace. Dicka scored in the first minute after Akram Moghrabi headed down a cross from the right. Dicka scored the second of the day when he acrobatically volleyed the ball into the net from a corner in the 35th minute. Mohun Bagan could have scored more if not their forwards missed sitters. East Bengal now seems out of the title race and currently sits 3rd in the league table with 19 points from 11 matches.
East Bengal released their foreign import Willis Plaza after a series of poor performances and lack of goals from the star forward who was also carrying a thigh injury along. East Bengal roped in Liberian Ansumana Kromah who was released by Mohun Bagan earlier in the transfer window. The former Green and Maroon attacking midfielder will boost the Red and Gold attacking set up.
East Bengal faced Minerva Punjab F.C. on 30 January at the Barasat Stadium next where in a crunch game East Bengal managed a 2–2 draw, coming back from 0–2 at HT. Minerva Punjab F.C. went ahead in the 20th minute when Sukhdev Singh scored from a rebound. Minerva Punjab F.C. extended their lead in the 33rd minute when their star Bhutanese man Chencho Gyeltshen scored dribbling past two defenders. After Half Time, East Bengal came out with renewed vigour and rallied back into the game with goals from Jobi Justin in the 59th minute from a Katsumi Yusa corner and Brandon Vanlalremdika in the 88th minute. East Bengal could have come out with all 3 points if not their star Japanese man Katsumi Yusa missed from the spot early in the second half. East Bengal now sits at 3rd spot in the League Table with 20 points from 12 games with 6 more matches to go.

=== February ===
East Bengal released another of their foreign import Armand Bazie for his poor performances throughout the League campaign. Bazie is the third foreign player after Charles and Willis Plaza that East Bengal has released during the ongoing I League season.
East Bengal faced Indian Arrows on 4 February at the Barasat Stadium next where after a frustrating performance by the Red and Gold front line, East Bengal managed to score in the dying minute of the match, when Dudu Omagbemi found the net from a glancing header in the 93rd minute, taking a 1–0 lead, ensuring 3 points for the Red and Golds who now sits 3rd in the table with 23 points from 13 games, with 5 more to go.
East Bengal faced Minerva Punjab F.C. on 13 February at the Tau Devi Lal Stadium in Panchkula next and in a do-or-die game against the league leaders East Bengal managed a 1–0 win with a sublime strike from Cavin Lobo in the 60th minute. East Bengal managed to hold on to the lead and reduced the gap to just 3 points from the league leaders Minerva Punjab F.C. East Bengal now sits at 26 points from 14 games with just 4 more to go.
East Bengal roped in Uganda national football team Defensive Midfield player Khalid Aucho as a replacement for 'Armand Bazie'. He played for Serbian giants Red Star Belgrade before getting released in July 2017.
East Bengal faced Gokulam Kerala F.C. on 17 February at the EMS Stadium in Kozhikode next and lost 2–1 to the home side after leading 1–0 at Half-time courtesy of a spot-kick from Katsumi Yusa in the injury time before the break. Gokulam Kerala F.C. came back hard in the second half and rallied to score two goals to snatch back to back wins. This loss has hurt the title ambitions for the Red and Golds, with just 3 matches to go.
East Bengal faced Chennai City FC on 24 February at the Salt Lake Stadium next and in a do-or-die game, the Red and Gold brigade ran riot against the southerners and clinched an all-important 7–1 win. Mahmoud Amnah opened the scoring in the 20th minute and since then the floodgates were opened. Dharmaraj Ravanan placed the ball into his own net for the second goal when he misjudged the cross from Lalramchullova. Dudu Omagbemi finally rose to the occasion and showed his class and scored in the next 4 goals, thus becoming the fourth East Bengal player to score a hat-trick in the season and first in this I League. Gabriel Fernandes came on in the 80th minute for his first appearance in the I League and in no time put his name in the scoresheet with a sublime strike from outside the box to make it 7–1 for the hosts. Eduardo Ferreira got his 4th booking and will miss the vital away game against Shillong Lajong on 5 March. East Bengal now sits 2nd in the table with just 2 more matches to go.

=== March ===
East Bengal faced Shillong Lajong on 5 March at the Jawaharlal Nehru Stadium next and in a must-win game the Red and Gold Brigade again drew 2–2 to seriously hamper their title aspirations. Dudu Omagbemi opened the scoring but Shillong Lajong rallied from behind to take a 2–1 lead. Dudu Omagbemi scored the equalized late to ensure East Bengal have a chance on the last round to get the title if all results go in their favour.
East Bengal faced NEROCA F.C. on 8 March at the Salt Lake Stadium next in the final game of the 2017-18 I-League and in a 4 way title decider final round, the Red and Golds only managed a 1–1 draw with Dudu Omagbemi scoring the equalizer after Felix Chidi put NEROCA F.C. ahead. Minerva Punjab FC won their match 1-0 which meant the team from Punjab won their maiden I-League title.
East Bengal finished the I-League campaign in the 4th Position, dragging their conquest to the long-awaited title for 15 years now. East Bengal has qualified for the Pre-Quarter-finals of the 2018 Indian Super Cup that is going to start from 31 March at the Kalinga Stadium, Bhubaneshwar.
East Bengal appointed veteran and club legend Subhash Bhowmick as the Technical director to assist Khalid Jamil. This is the fourth stint for Subhash Bhowmick popularly known as Bhombol Da at East Bengal and this one after 9 long years after he resigned as the Coach of the East Bengal club after the infamous 5-3 Kolkata Derby on 25 October 2009.

=== April ===
East Bengal faced Mumbai City F.C. on 5 April 2018 at the Kalinga Stadium, Bhubaneshwar in the Pre Quarter-finals of the 2018 Indian Super Cup. The ISL side took the lead early in the first half from a sublime free kick from their foreign import Achille Emaná in the 22nd minute of the game. The Red and Gold brigade bounced back and equalized within 4 minutes when star man Katsumi Yusa headed in an inch-perfect cross by Laldanmawia Ralte from the right. East Bengal rallied back in the second half when Mahmoud Amnah scored the winner in the 73rd minute with a perfect volley to win it 2–1.
East Bengal faced Aizawl F.C. on 8 April 2018 at the Kalinga Stadium, Bhubaneshwar in the Quarter-finals of the 2018 Indian Super Cup and in adverse hot and humid conditions, the Red and Gold brigade managed to snatch a 1–0 win against the Highlanders with an injury-time spot kick by ex Aizawl F.C. man Laldanmawia Ralte himself in the 95th minute to put East Bengal through to the Semi-finals of the inaugural Indian Super Cup.
East Bengal faced FC Goa on 16 April 2018 at the Kalinga Stadium, Bhubaneshwar in the Semi-final of the 2018 Indian Super Cup. FC Goa missed the likes of Hugo Boumous and Pronay Halder who are carrying double Yellow Card and also Bruno Pinheiro, Brandon Fernandes and Sergio Juste Marin who were Sent Off in the Quarter-final match against Jamshedpur FC. In the crunch game amidst adverse hot and humid conditions the Red and Gold brigade snatched a hard-fought 1–0 win against the ISL side with the solitary goal coming at the 78th minute of the game when Katsumi Yusa put in a cross from the left which was tapped in by Dudu Omagbemi to break the deadlock. FC Goa was soon put down to 10 men as their star midfield man Edu Bedia was given marching orders after a double booking in the 82nd minute. East Bengal managed to hold onto the lead and reached the inaugural Indian Super Cup Final.
East Bengal faced Bengaluru FC on 20 April 2018 at the Kalinga Stadium, Bhubaneshwar in the final of the inaugural 2018 Indian Super Cup. Bengaluru FC has defeated Mohun Bagan 4–2 in the other Semi-final and lost by 4–1. Ansumana Kromah took the lead for East Bengal in the 28th minute with an acrobatic attempt. Rahul Bheke equalised for Bengaluru FC in the 39th minute, heading in from a corner. Samad Ali Mallick was given marching orders after he elbowed an opponent which was the turning point of the game. Sunil Chhetri scored a brace while Miku scored another as Bengaluru FC won 4-1 and lifted the inaugural Indian Super Cup.

== Kit ==
Supplier: PERF / Sponsors: Kingfisher Premium / Co-Sponsor: Shyam Steel

Home	Away	Third Kit

== Competitions ==
=== Overall ===
Competition	First match	Last match	Final Position
Calcutta Football League	13 August 2017	24 September 2017	Champions
I-League	28 November 2017	8 March 2018	4th
Super Cup	5 April 2018	20 April 2018	Runners Up

=== Overview ===
Competition	Record							
Competition	Pld	W	D	L	GF	GA	GD	Win %
CFL	9	7	2	0	28	7	+21	77.78
I League	18	8	7	3	32	19	+13	44.44
Super Cup	4	3	0	1	5	5	+0	75.00
Total	31	18	9	4	65	31	+34	58.06

Last updated: 20 April 2018
Source: Competitions

=== Calcutta Football League ===
==== Standings ====
Pos	Team	Pld	W	D	L	GF	GA	GD	Pts	Qualification or relegation
1	East Bengal (C)	9	7	2	0	28	7	+21	23	Champion
2	Mohun Bagan	9	7	2	0	20	5	+15	23	
3	Mohammedan	9	5	2	2	28	14	+14	17	
4	Peerless_{1} (S, U, B, S, U, B)	9	5	0	4	7	10	−3	15	
5	Tollygunge Agragami_{1}	9	4	1	4	5	13	−8	13	
6	Calcutta Customs	9	3	3	3	6	7	−1	12	
7	Rainbow_{1}	9	3	2	4	9	13	−4	11	
8	Pathachakra	9	3	1	5	16	12	+4	10	
9	Southern Samity (R)	4	0	1	3	0	9	−9	1	Relegation to Group B
10	Railway_{1} (R)	9	1	0	8	0	21	−21	3	Relegation to Group B

Source: Soccerway
(B) ?; (C) Champions; (R) Relegated; (S) ?; (U) ?

Note: _{1}=These teams got walkover against Southern Samity and they got 3 point each.

=== I-League ===
==== Table ====
Pos	Team	Pld	W	D	L	GF	GA	GD	Pts
2	NEROCA	18	9	5	4	20	13	+7	32
3	Mohun Bagan	18	8	7	3	28	14	+14	31
4	East Bengal	18	8	7	3	32	19	+13	31
5	Aizawl	18	6	6	6	21	18	+3	24
6	Shillong Lajong	18	6	4	8	17	25	−8	22

Source: i-league.org
Rules for classification: 1) points; 2) head-to-head points; 3) head-to-head goal difference; 4) goal difference; 5) number of goals scored; 6) drawing of lots

==== Result summary ====
Overall								Home						Away					
Pld	W	D	L	GF	GA	GD	Pts	W	D	L	GF	GA	GD	W	D	L	GF	GA	GD
18	8	7	3	32	19	+13	31	5	3	1	22	11	+11	3	4	2	10	8	+2

Last updated: 8 March 2018.
Source: i-league.org

==== Results by round ====
Round	1	2	3	4	5	6	7	8	9	10	11	12	13	14	15	16	17	18
Ground	H	A	H	H	A	H	A	A	A	A	H	H	H	A	A	H	A	H
Result	D	L	W	W	W	W	D	W	D	D	L	D	W	W	L	W	D	D
Position	4	6	4	3	2	1	1	2	2	3	3	4	3	3	3	2	4	4

Updated to match(es) played on 8 March 2018. Source: Soccrway
A = Away; H = Home; W = Win; D = Draw; L = Loss

=== Super Cup ===
==== Brackets ====
Round of 16
31 March
Aizawl (pen.)	2 (5)
Chennaiyin	2 (3)
5 April
East Bengal	2
Mumbai City	1
2 April
Minerva Punjab	0 (4)
Jamshedpur	0 (5)
3 April
FC Goa	3
ATK	1
1 April
Churchill Brothers	1
Mohun Bagan	2
4 April
Pune City	2
Shillong Lajong	3
1 April
Bengaluru FC	2
Gokulam Kerala	1
6 April
NEROCA	3
Kerala Blasters	2

Quarter-finals
8 April
Aizawl	0
East Bengal	1
12 April
Jamshedpur	1
FC Goa	5
11 April
Mohun Bagan	3
Shillong Lajong	1
13 April
Bengaluru FC	3
NEROCA	1

Semi-finals
16 April
East Bengal	1
FC Goa	0
17 April
Mohun Bagan	2
Bengaluru FC	4

Final
20 April
East Bengal	1
Bengaluru FC	4

==== Pre quarter-finals ====
5 April 2018
20:00

Mumbai City FC	1-2	East Bengal
Zakeer Mundampara (yellow card) 6'; Sehnaj Singh (yellow card) 9'; Achille Emaná 22'		Katsumi Yusa 26'; Mahmoud Amnah 73'

Kalinga Stadium, Bhubaneshwar
Attendance: 4354
Referee: Venkatesh R

==== Quarter-finals ====
8 April 2018
16:00

Aizawl F.C.	0-1	East Bengal
Hmingthanmawia (yellow card) 33'; C Lalrosanga (yellow card) 77'; Masih Saighani (yellow card) 81'		Khalid Aucho (yellow card) 62'; Laldanmawia Ralte 90+5' (pen.)

Kalinga Stadium, Bhubaneshwar
Attendance: 3286
Referee: C. R. Srikrishna

==== Semi-finals ====
16 April 2018
16:00

East Bengal	1-0	FC Goa
Gurwinder Singh (yellow card) 25'; Cavin Lobo (yellow card) 36'; Samad Ali Mallick (yellow card) 67'; Dudu Omagbemi 78'		Seriton Fernandes (yellow card) 23'; Edu Bedia (yellow card) (yellow-red card) 37' 82'

Kalinga Stadium, Bhubaneshwar
Attendance: 4200
Referee: Santosh Kumar

==== Final ====
20 April 2018
16:00

East Bengal	1-4	Bengaluru FC
Ansumana Kromah 28' (yellow card) 74'; Gurwinder Singh (yellow card) 44'; Khalid Aucho (yellow card) 45'; Samad Ali Mallick (red card) 45+2'; Mahmoud Amnah (yellow card) 74'		Gurpreet Singh Sandhu (yellow card) 8'; Rahul Bheke 39'; Sunil Chhetri 69' (pen.) 90'; Miku 71'; John Johnson (yellow card) 88'

Kalinga Stadium, Bhubaneshwar
Attendance: 9500
Referee: Ramaswamy Srikrishna

== Matches ==
Win Draw Loss

=== Calcutta Football League ===
==== Fixtures and results ====
13 August 2017 1	East Bengal	4–1	NBP Rainbow	East Bengal Ground
	V.P. Suhair 18' 43' 46'; Brandon Vanlalremdika 72'		Chattu Mondal 80'	Man of the Match: V.P. Suhair (East Bengal)

16 August 2017 2	East Bengal	2–0	Calcutta Customs	East Bengal Ground
	Carlyle Mitchell 76' 93'			Man of the Match: Carlyle Mitchell (East Bengal)

19 August 2017 3	East Bengal	5–1	Peerless	East Bengal Ground
	Willis Plaza 28'; Gabriel Fernandes 72'; Surabuddin Mollick 75' 76' 94'		Syed Rahim Nabi 40'	Man of the Match: Surabuddin Mollick (East Bengal)

23 August 2017 4	East Bengal	3–0	Southern Samity	East Bengal Ground
	Laldanmawia Ralte 7'; Samad Ali Mallick 57'; Mahmoud Amnah 74'

28 August 2017 5	East Bengal	3–0	Railway FC	East Bengal Ground
	Jobi Justin 3'; V.P. Suhair 68' 82'

7 September 2017 6	East Bengal	2–1	Pathachakra	East Bengal Ground
	Brandon Vanlalremdika 45'; Mahmoud Amnah 87' (pen.)		Jagannath 21'

16 September 2017 7	East Bengal	2–2	Mohammedan Sporting	Kalyani Stadium
	Mahmoud Amnah 3'; Willis Plaza 80'		Jiten Murmu; Aser Pierrick Dipanda

19 September 2017 8	East Bengal	5–0	Tollygunge Agragami	East Bengal Ground
	Willis Plaza 28' 51' 63'; Nikhil Poojari 82'; Laldanmawia Ralte 84'

24 September 2017 9^{(KD)}	East Bengal	2–2	Mohun Bagan	Kanchenjunga Stadium
	Laldanmawia Ralte 44'; Mahmoud Amnah 66' (pen.)		Carlyle Mitchell(o.g.) 3'; Ansumana Kromah 46' (pen.)

=== Preseason friendlies ===
==== Fixtures and results ====
25 October 2017 1	Bengaluru	1–1	East Bengal	Sree Kanteerava Stadium
	Miku 80'	Report	Surabuddin Mollick 9'

27 October 2017 2	Bengaluru	3–1	East Bengal	Sree Kanteerava Stadium
	Udanta Singh; Miku	Report	Willis Plaza

30 October 2017 3	Pune City	2–1	East Bengal	Balewadi Stadium
	Jonatan Lucca; Emiliano Alfaro	pre/1r95cu0mj8no31b0ezqiwiwhw9 Report	Mahmoud Amnah

3 November 2017 4	Goa	1–2	East Bengal	Bambolim Stadium
	Manvir 80'	Report	Brandon Vanlalremdika 8'; Charles 82'

10 November 2017 5	Jamshedpur	1–3	East Bengal	Jamshedpur Stadium
	Izu Azuka		Mahmoud Amnah; Yumnam Raju(o.g.); Surabuddin Mollick

=== I League ===
==== Fixtures and results ====
28 November 2017 1	East Bengal	2–2	Aizawl	Salt Lake Stadium
20:00 IST	Eduardo Ferreira 66'; Katsumi Yusa 72'; Brandon Vanlalremdika (yellow card) 78'	Report	Alfred Jaryan (yellow card) 19'; Lalrinzuala Khiangte (yellow card) 43'; Masih Saighani (yellow card) 45+1'; William Lalnunfela 74', 90+4'; H. Lalmuankima (yellow card) 78'; Kareem Omolaja (yellow card) 80'	Attendance: 16611; Referee: Santosh Kumar; Man of the Match: Katsumi Yusa(East Bengal)

3 December 2017 2^{(KD)}	Mohun Bagan	1–0	East Bengal	Salt Lake Stadium
14:00 IST	Aser Pierrick Dipanda (yellow card) 34'; Kingsley Obumneme 39'; Ricky Lallawmawma (yellow card) 45'	Report	Mehtab Singh (yellow card) 14'; Gurwinder Singh (yellow card) 37'	Attendance: 64360; Referee: C. R. Srikrishna; Man of the Match: Kingsley Obumneme (Mohun Bagan)

9 December 2017 3	East Bengal	5–1	Shillong Lajong	Barasat Stadium
17:30 IST	Mahmoud Amnah 14'; Eduardo Ferreira 19'; Laldanmawia Ralte 51', 62'; Katsumi Yusa 75' (pen.); Prakash Sarkar (yellow card) 86'	Report	Samuel Lalmuanpuia (yellow card) 82'; Samuel Lalmuanpuia 87'	Attendance: 10,023; Referee: Senthil Nathan; Man of the Match: Laldanmawia Ralte (East Bengal)

16 December 2017 4	East Bengal	3–2	Churchill Brothers	Barasat Stadium
17:30 IST	Laldanmawia Ralte 51' (yellow card) 54'; Willis Plaza 45+2', 90+6' (yellow card) 85'; Eduardo Ferreira (yellow card) 69'; Charles (yellow card) 81'	Report	Peter Omoduemuke 15' (yellow card) 55'; Nicholas Fernandes 60'; Ogba Kalu Nnanna (yellow card) 89'; Eric Obinna Chukwunyelu (yellow card) 90'	Attendance: 11,182; Referee: Ajit Kumar Meitei; Man of the Match: James Kithan (Churchill Brothers)

22 December 2017 5	Chennai City	1–2	East Bengal	Jawaharlal Nehru Stadium
17:30 IST	Alexander Romario Jesuraj 43'; S. Pandiyan (yellow card) 69'	Report	Katsumi Yusa 27'; Charles 31'; Salam Ranjan Singh (yellow card) 55'; Armand Bazie (yellow card) 90'	Attendance: 12758; Referee: Tejas Visvasrao Nagvenkar; Man of the Match: Uros Poljanec (Chennai City FC)

27 December 2017 6	East Bengal	1–0	Gokulam Kerala	Salt Lake Stadium
20:00 IST	Mohammed Rafique 44'	Report	Rohit Mirza (red card) 52'; Emmanuel Chigozie (yellow card) 85'	Attendance: 9983; Referee: Umesh Bora; Man of the Match: Mohammed Rafique (East Bengal)

30 December 2017 7	Neroca	1–1	East Bengal	Khuman Lampak Main Stadium
14:00 IST	Govin Singh (yellow card) 31'; Nedo Turkovic 89'; Aryn Williams (yellow card) 91'	Report	Katsumi Yusa 12'; Bazie Armand (yellow card) 61'; Eduardo Ferreira (yellow card) 93'	Attendance: 28243; Referee: Senthil Nathan S Man of the Match: Eduardo Ferreira (East Bengal)

2 January 2018 8	Indian Arrows	0–2	East Bengal	Ambedkar Stadium
14:00 IST	Abhishek Halder (yellow card) 12'	Report	Mahmoud Amnah 13'; Katsumi Yusa 16'; Arnab Mondal (red card)	Attendance: 5205; Referee: Umesh Bora; Man of the Match: Mahmoud Amnah (East Bengal)

8 January 2018 9	Churchill Brothers	1–1	East Bengal	Tilak Maidan Stadium
14:00 IST	Kalu Ogba (yellow card) 55'; Mechac Koffi 75'	Report	Jobi Justin 26'	Attendance: 3108; Referee: Rahul Kumar Gupta; Man of the Match: Mechac Koffi (Churchill Brothers)

16 January 2018 10	Aizawl	0–0	East Bengal	Rajiv Gandhi Stadium
14:00 IST	Masih Saighani (yellow card) 61'; Alfred Jaryan (yellow card) 64'	Report	Laldanmawia Ralte (yellow card) 10'; Lalramchullova (yellow card) 54'; Katsumi Yusa (yellow card) 61'	Attendance: 7280; Referee: Rosario Fernandes; Man of the Match: Avilash Paul (Aizawl FC)

21 January 2018 11^{(KD)}	East Bengal	0–2	Mohun Bagan	Salt Lake Stadium
14:00 IST	Armand Bazzie (yellow card) 18'	Report	Dicka 2' 35'; Kingshuk Debnath (yellow card) 17'	Attendance: 52951; Referee: C. R. Srikrishna; Man of the Match: Dicka (Mohun Bagan)

30 January 2018 12	East Bengal	2–2	Minerva Punjab	Barasat Stadium
13:55 IST	Katsumi Yusa (penalty missed) 47'; Jobi Justin 59'; Eduardo Ferreira (yellow card) 72'; Brandon Vanlalremdika 88'	Report	Sukhdev Singh 20'; Chencho Gyeltshen 33'; Souvik Das (yellow card) 68'; Guy Eric Dano (yellow card) 90+2'	Attendance: 11200; Referee: Tejas Visvasrao Nagvenkar; Man of the Match: Kiran Kumar Limbu (Minerva Punjab F.C.)

4 February 2018 13	East Bengal	1–0	Indian Arrows	Barasat Stadium
17:30 IST	Dudu Omagbemi 90+3'	Report		Attendance: 8692; Referee: Om Prakash Thakur; Man of the Match: Prabhsukhan Singh Gill (Indian Arrows)

13 February 2018 14	Minerva Punjab	0–1	East Bengal	Tau Devi Lal Stadium
14:00 IST	Amandeep Singh (yellow card) 45+1'; Bali Gagandeep (yellow card) 70'	Report	Cavin Lobo 60'; Mahmoud Amnah (yellow card) 77'; Ubaid CK (yellow card) 90+2'	Attendance: 8243; Referee: Ajit Kumar Meitei; Man of the Match: Mahmoud Amnah (East Bengal)

17 February 2018 15	Gokulam Kerala	2–1	East Bengal	EMS Stadium
14:00 IST	Kivi 51'; Irshad (yellow card) (yellow-red card) 55' 90+1'; Emanuel (yellow card) 70'; Salam Ranjan Singh(o.g.) 87'	Report	Katsumi Yusa (yellow card) 39' (goal) 45+4'(p); Arnab Mondal (yellow card) (yellow-red card) 90+1' 90+6'; Lalramchullova (yellow card) 90+1'	Attendance: 3257; Referee: Rahul Kumar Gupta; Man of the Match: Bilal Hussain Khan (Gokulam Kerala FC)

24 February 2018 16	East Bengal	7–1	Chennai City	Salt Lake Stadium
14:00 IST	Mahmoud Amnah 20'; Dharmaraj Ravanan(o.g.) 23'; Dudu Omagbemi 32' 49' 56' 61'; Eduardo Ferreira (yellow card) 36'; Gabriel Fernandes 84'		Mashoor Shereef 59'	Attendance: 8753; Referee: Crystal John; Man of the Match: Dudu Omagbemi(East Bengal)

5 March 2018 17	Shillong Lajong	2–2	East Bengal	Jawaharlal Nehru Stadium
17:30 IST	Aibanbha Dohling 49'; Samuel Lalmuanpuia 69'(p)		Dudu Omagbemi 20' 88'; Samad Ali Mallick (yellow card) 90+4'	Attendance: 5706; Referee: Umesh Bora; Man of the Match: Nidhin Lal (Shillong Lajong)

8 March 2018 18	East Bengal	1-1	Neroca	Salt Lake Stadium
15:00 IST	Lalramchullova (yellow card) 45'; Dudu Omagbemi 73' (yellow card) 78'		Ngasepam Tondonba (yellow card) 10'; Felix Chidi Odili 42'	Attendance: 26960; Referee: Rowan Arumughan; Man of the Match: Lalit Thapa (Neroca FC)

=== Indian Super Cup ===
==== Fixture and results ====
5 April 2018 R16	Mumbai City	1-2	East Bengal	Kalinga Stadium
20:00 IST	Zakeer Mundampara (yellow card) 6'; Sehnaj Singh (yellow card) 9'; Achille Emaná 22'		Katsumi Yusa 26'; Mahmoud Amnah 73'	Attendance: 4354; Referee: Venkatesh R Man of the Match: Mahmoud Amnah (East Bengal)

8 April 2018 QF	Aizawl	0-1	East Bengal	Kalinga Stadium
16:00 IST	Hmingthanmawia (yellow card) 33'; C Lalrosanga (yellow card) 77'; Masih Saighani (yellow card) 81'		Khalid Aucho (yellow card) 62'; Laldanmawia Ralte 90+5' (pen.)	Referee: C. R. Srikrishna; Man of the Match: Laldanmawia Ralte (East Bengal)

16 April 2018 SF	East Bengal	1-0	Goa	Kalinga Stadium
16:00 IST	Gurwinder Singh (yellow card) 25'; Cavin Lobo (yellow card) 36'; Samad Ali Mallick (yellow card) 67'; Dudu Omagbemi 78'		Seriton Fernandes (yellow card) 23'; Edu Bedia (yellow card) (yellow-red card) 37' 82'	Attendance: 4200; Referee: Santosh Kumar; Man of the Match: Laxmikant Kattimani (FC Goa)

20 April 2018 Final	East Bengal	1-4	Bengaluru	Kalinga Stadium
16:00 IST	Ansumana Kromah 28' (yellow card) 74'; Gurwinder Singh (yellow card) 44'; Khalid Aucho (yellow card) 45'; Samad Ali Mallick (red card) 45+2'; Mahmoud Amnah (yellow card) 74'		Gurpreet Singh Sandhu (yellow card) 8'; Rahul Bheke 39'; Sunil Chhetri 69' (pen.) 90'; Miku 71'; John Johnson (yellow card) 88'	Attendance: 9500; Referee: Ramaswamy Srikrishna; Man of the Match: Sunil Chhetri (Bengaluru FC)

== Statistics ==
=== Appearances ===
Players with no appearances not included in the list.

As of match played 20 April 2018

Sortable table
No.	Pos.	Nat.	Name	CFL		I League		Indian Super Cup		Total	
No.	Pos.	Nat.	Name	Apps	Starts	Apps	Starts	Apps	Starts	Apps	Starts
12	GK	(India)	Luis Barreto	9	9	8	8	0	0	17	17
32	GK	(India)	Mirshad Michu	0	0	3	3	0	0	3	3
1	GK	(India)	Ubaid CK	0	0	7	7	4	4	11	11
16	DF	(India)	Gurwinder Singh	7	7	3	3	4	4	14	14
4	DF	(India)	Lalramchullova	8	8	14	10	4	4	26	26
25	DF	(India)	Samad Ali Mallick	8	8	4	2	4	4	16	16
3	DF	(India)	Arnab Mondal	3	3	12	12	0	0	15	15
18	DF	(India)	Mehtab Singh	2	2	6	6	0	0	8	8
24	DF	(India)	Salam Ranjan Singh	0	0	16	14	0	0	16	14
29	DF	(India)	Deepak Kumar	0	0	4	3	1	0	5	3
14	DF	(Equatorial Guinea)	Eduardo Ferreira	–		17	17	4	4	21	21
23	DF	(India)	Tanmoy Ghosh	3	3	0	0	0	0	3	3
6	MF	(Syria)	Mahmoud Amnah	9	9	16	16	4	4	29	29
30	MF	(India)	Brandon Vanlalremdika	8	7	9	4	0	0	17	11
17	MF	(India)	Laldanmawia Ralte	9	9	14	13	4	4	27	27
8	MF	(India)	Mohammed Rafique	5	5	14	5	0	0	19	10
21	MF	(India)	Surabuddin Mollick	9	2	6	0	0	0	15	2
7	MF	(India)	Cavin Lobo	7	0	13	9	4	4	23	13
10	MF	(Japan)	Katsumi Yusa	–		18	18	4	4	22	22
27	MF	(India)	Nikhil Poojari	2	1	0	0	0	0	2	1
38	MF	(India)	Prakash Sarkar	5	2	9	9	0	0	14	14
11	MF	(India)	Gabriel Fernandes	7	2	2	0	1	0	11	2
40	MF	(Liberia)	Ansumana Kromah^{[B]}	–		7	3	3	1	10	4
5	MF	(Uganda)	Khalid Aucho	–		–		4	4	4	4
35	MF	(India)	Yami Longvah	2	0	3	3	0	0	5	3
19	FW	(India)	V P Suhair	5	5	0	0	0	0	5	5
22	FW	(India)	Jobi Justin	4	3	9	6	2	0	15	9
44	FW	(Nigeria)	Dudu Omagbemi	–		8	8	4	3	12	11
Players who have left/released by East Bengal mid-season
5	DF	(Trinidad and Tobago)	Carlyle Mitchell	6	6	–		–		6	6
13	MF	(Ivory Coast)	Armand Bazie	–		12	9	–		12	9
20	MF	(India)	Richard Costa	1	1	0	0	–		1	1
9	FW	(Trinidad and Tobago)	Willis Plaza	7	7	10	8	–		17	15
15	FW	(Brazil)	Charles	–		7	2	–		7	2

^{[B]} Played for Mohun Bagan in the 2017–18 CFL and 2017–18 I-League. Made 9 Appearances in 2017–18 CFL and 11 appearances in 2017–18 I-League for Mohun Bagan.

=== Goal scorers ===
Rank	No.	Pos.	Nat.	Name	CFL	I League	Super Cup	Total
1	44	FW	(Nigeria)	Dudu Omagbemi	–	8	1	9
2	6	MF	(Syria)	Mahmoud Amnah	4	3	1	8
3	10	MF	(Japan)	Katsumi Yusa	-	6	1	7
3	17	MF	(India)	Laldanmawia Ralte	3	3	1	7
3	9	FW	(Trinidad and Tobago)	Willis Plaza^{a}	5	2	–	7
6	19	FW	(India)	V P Suhair	5	-	0	5
7	22	FW	(India)	Jobi Justin	1	2	0	3
7	30	MF	(India)	Brandon Vanlalremdika	2	1	0	3
7	21	MF	(India)	Surabuddin Mollick	3	-	0	3
10	14	DF	(Equatorial Guinea)	Eduardo Ferreira	-	2	0	2
10	11	MF	(India)	Gabriel Fernandes	1	1	0	2
10	5	DF	(Trinidad and Tobago)	Carlyle Mitchell^{a}	2	–	–	2
13	15	FW	(Brazil)	Charles^{a}	–	1	–	1
13	8	MF	(India)	Mohammed Rafique	0	1	0	1
13	7	MF	(India)	Cavin Lobo	0	1	0	1
13	40	MF	(Liberia)	Ansumana Kromah	0	0	1	1
13	27	MF	(India)	Nikhil Poojari	1	–	–	1
13	25	DF	(India)	Samad Ali Mallick	1	0	0	1
				Own Goals	–	1	–	1
				TOTAL	28	32	5	65

^{a} Denotes Players who left East Bengal mid season.

==== Hat-tricks ====
Player	Against	Result	Date	Competition
(India) V P Suhair	Rainbow FC	4–1	13 August 2017	CFL 2017–18
(India) Surabuddin Mollick	Peerless	5–1	19 August 2017	CFL 2017–18
(Trinidad and Tobago) Willis Plaza	Tollygunge Agragami	5–0	19 September 2017	CFL 2017–18
(Nigeria) Dudu Omagbemi^{4}	Chennai City F.C.	7–1	24 February 2018	2017–18 I-League

^{4} Scored 4 goals in the match

=== Clean sheets ===
Correct as of matches played on 20 April 2018

No.	Player	CFL	I League	Super Cup	TOTAL
12	(India) Luis Barreto	4	3	0	7
32	(India) Mirshad Michu	–	0	0	0
1	(India) Ubaid CK	–	2	2	4

=== Disciplinary record ===
As of matches played 20 April 2018

No.	Pos.	Name	I League			Indian Super Cup			Total			Remarks
No.	Pos.	Name	Yellow card	(yellow card) (yellow-red card)	Red card	Yellow card	(yellow card) (yellow-red card)	Red card	Yellow card	(yellow card) (yellow-red card)	Red card	Remarks
30	MF	Brandon Vanlalremdika	1	0	0	0	0	0	1	0	0	
16	DF	Gurwinder Singh	1	0	0	2	0	0	3	0	0	
18	DF	Mehtab Singh	1	0	0	0	0	0	1	0	0	
38	MF	Prakash Sarkar	1	0	0	0	0	0	1	0	0	
17	MF	Laldanmawia Ralte	2	0	0	0	0	0	2	0	0	
14	DF	Eduardo Ferreira	4	0	0	0	0	0	4	0	0	Missed the match against Shillong Lajong on 5 March 2018.
9	FW	Willis Plaza	1	0	0	0	0	0	1	0	0	
15	FW	Charles do Vale de Souza	1	0	0	0	0	0	1	0	0	
24	DF	Salam Ranjan Singh	1	0	0	0	0	0	1	0	0	
13	MF	Armand Bazie	3	0	0	0	0	0	3	0	0	
10	MF	Katsumi Yusa	2	0	0	0	0	0	2	0	0	
4	DF	Lalramchullova	3	0	0	0	0	0	3	0	0	
6	MF	Mahmoud Amnah	1	0	0	2	0	0	3	0	0	
1	GK	Ubaid CK	1	0	0	0	0	0	1	0	0	
3	DF	Arnab Mondal	2	1	0	0	0	0	2	1	0	Missed the match against Chennai City F.C. on 24 February 2018.
25	DF	Samad Ali Mallick	1	0	0	1	0	1	2	0	1	
44	FW	Dudu Omagbemi	1	0	0	0	0	0	1	0	0	
5	MF	Khalid Aucho	0	0	0	2	0	0	2	0	0	
7	MF	Cavin Lobo	0	0	0	1	0	0	1	0	0	
40	MF	Ansumana Kromah	0	0	0	1	0	0	1	0	0	

== Honours ==
=== Titles won ===
2017–18 Calcutta Premier Division Champions (39th time Champions)
*8th consecutive Calcutta League title for East Bengal (2010–2017)

== See also ==
- 2017–18 in Indian football
- 2017 CFL Premier Division
- 2017–18 I-League
- 2018 Indian Super Cup
