= 2017 CFL Premier Division =

CFL Premier Division
- Season: 2017–18
- Champions: East Bengal (39th title)
- Matches: 41
- Goals: 127 (3.1 per match)

The 2017 Calcutta Football League Premier Division was the 119th season of the CFL Premier Division, a state league within the Indian state of West Bengal. The league is divided into two groups – Group A and Group B. The Championship title is awarded only to the Group A winner, while four teams from Group A are relegated to Group B at the end of the season and four teams from Group B are simultaneously promoted to Group A for the next season. The fixtures of Group A kicked off on 12 August 2017, and of Group B on 7 August 2017.

== Premier Division A ==
CFL Premier Division A
- Season: 2017–18
- Champions: East Bengal (8 times)
- Relegated: Railway FC; Southern Samity
- Matches: 41
- Goals: 127 (3.1 per match)
- Top goalscorer: (Cameroon) Aser Pierrick Dipanda (Mohammedan)(12 goals)
- Highest scoring: Mohammedan vs Peerless SC; 5–2 (24 August 2017) (7 goals)
- Longest winning run: East Bengal (7 matches)
- Longest unbeaten run: East Bengal; Mohun Bagan (9 matches)
- Longest winless run: Pathachakra F.C. (5 matches)
- Longest losing run: Railway FC (8 matches)

=== Standings ===
Pos	Team	Pld	W	D	L	GF	GA	GD	Pts	Qualification or relegation
1	East Bengal (C)	9	7	2	0	26	5	+21	23	Champion
2	Mohun Bagan	9	7	2	0	20	5	+15	23	
3	Mohammedan	9	5	2	2	28	14	+14	17	
4	Peerless SC_{1}	9	5	0	4	7	10	−3	15	
5	Tollygunge Agragami_{1}	9	4	1	4	5	13	−8	13	
6	Calcutta Customs	9	3	3	3	6	7	−1	12	
7	NBP Rainbow AC_{1}	9	3	2	4	9	13	−4	11	
8	Pathachakra	9	3	1	5	16	12	+4	10	
9	Southern Samity (R)	4	0	1	3	0	9	−9	1	Relegation to Premier Division B
10	Railway_{1} (R)	9	1	0	8	0	21	−21	3	Relegation to Premier Division B

Source: Soccerway
(C) Champions; (R) Relegated

Note: _{1}=These teams got walkover against Southern Samity and they got 3 point each.

=== Results ===
Home \ Away	CCU	KEB	MOH	MSC	PAT	PRL	RAI	RAC	SOU	TOL
Calcutta Customs	—	0–2	0–2	1–1	2–0	0–1	1-0	0–0	3-0	0–0
East Bengal		—	2–2	2–2	2–1	5–1	2–0	4–1	3–0	5-0
Mohun Bagan			—	2–1	5–2	2–1	2–0	1–1	3–0	2–0
Mohammedan				—	2–4	5-2	6–0	2–1	3–0	3–0
Pathachakra					—	1–5	3–0	0–1		5–0
Peerless SC						—	3–1	2–1	ABD	0–1
Railway							—		ABD	0–1
NBP Rainbow AC								—	ABD	1–2
Southern Samity									—	ABD
Tollygunge Agragami										—

Updated to match(es) played on 16 September 2017. Source: Soccerway

Home team won; Match drawn; Away team won; Match ABD

=== Statistics ===
==== Top scorers ====
As of 16 September 2017

Source: kolkatafootball.com

12 goals

- (Cameroon) Aser Pierrick Dipanda(MSC)

7 goals

- (Ivory Coast) Kamo Stephane Bayi (MOH)

6 goals

- (Liberia) Ansumana Kromah (MOH)

5 goals

- (India) Suhair V P(KEB)
- (Trinidad and Tobago) Willis Plaza (KEB)

4 goals

- (India) Sheikh Faiaz (Mohammedan)
- (India) Jiten Murmu(Mohammedan)
- (India) Azharuddin Mallick (MOH)
- (Syria) Mahmoud Amnah (KEB)
- (India) Laldanmawia Ralte (KEB)
- (Nigeria) Joel Sunday (PAT)
- (Liberia) Eric Brown (PAT)

3 goals

- (Trinidad and Tobago) Anthony Wolfe (TOL)
- (Ivory Coast) Leonce Dodoz Zikahi (PRL)

2 goals

- (India) Babun Das (PAT)
- (India) Shiltan Dsilva (MOH)
- (Trinidad and Tobago) Carlyle Mitchell (KEB)
- (Ivory Coast) Bazie Armand (RFC)
- (India) Anil Kisku (PRL)
- (India) Sukhwinder Sing (PRL)
- (India) Rajon Burman (CCU)
- (India) Nikhil Kadam (MOH)

1 goal

- (India) Syed Rahim Nabi (PRL)
- (India) Monotosh Chakladar (PAT)
- (India) Atinder Mani (MSC)
- (India) Dipendu Dowary (MSC)
- (India) Chattu Mondal (RFC)
- (India) Bijoy Mandi (SOU)
- (India) Gabriel Fernandes (KEB)
- (India) Nadong Bhutia (PAT)
- (India) Lalrindika Ralte (KEB)
- (India) Samad Ali Mallick (KEB)
- (Ivory Coast) Francis (PRL)
- (India) Jobby Justin (KEB)
- (India) Sumit Das (RFC)
- (India) Dhiman Sinha (CCU)
- (India) Brandon Vanlalremdika (KEB)
- (India) Manandeep Singh (MSC)
- (India) Prohlad Roy (MSC)
- (India) Arijit Singh (CCU)
- (Ivory Coast) Yao Kiosi Bernerd (RAC)
- (India) Satyam Sharma (MSC)
- (India) Nabin Hela (TOL)
- (Niger) Josef Olanrien (CCU)
- (Zimbabwe) Victor Kamhuka (PAT)

==== Hat-tricks ====
Player	For	Against	Result	Date	Ref
(Cameroon) Aser Pierrick Dipanda	Mohammedan	Peerless SC	5–2	21 August 2017	
(Cameroon) Aser Pierrick Dipanda ^{4}	Mohammedan	Railway FC	6–0	13 September 2017	
(India) Suhair V P	East Bengal	Rainbow AC	5–1	17 August 2017	
(Ivory Coast) Kamo Stephane Bayi ^{4}	Mohun Bagan	Pathachakra FC	5–2	19 August 2017	
(India) Surabuddin Mollick	East Bengal	Peerless SC	5–1		
(Trinidad and Tobago) Willis Plaza	East Bengal	Tollygunge Agragami	5–0	19 September 2017	

^{4} The player scored 4 goals

== Premier Division B ==
CFL Premier Division B
- Season: 2017–18
- Matches: 53
- Goals: 95 (1.79 per match)
- Highest scoring: West Bengal Police vs BNR; 3–2 (22 August 2017); BNR vs FCI; 1–4 (31 August 2017) (5 goals)
- Longest winning run: Kidderpore SC (3 matches)
- Longest unbeaten run: FCI; George Telegraph (7 matches)
- Longest winless run: Police AC (7 matches)
- Longest losing run: SAI; Kidderpore SC (3 matches)

=== Standings ===
Notes: After the results of the 10th round, the teams will be divided into two groups of top 6 and bottom 5. The top 6 teams are to play against each other in a single-leg format, called the championship round, while the bottom 5 teams play against each other in the same single-leg format called the relegation round. Each team carried forward their points and other records from the previous 10 matches into the championship or the relegation round.

Pos	Team	Pld	W	D	L	GF	GA	GD	Pts	Qualification or relegation
1	George Telegraph	14	6	8	0	16	7	+9	26	Promotion to Premier Division A
2	Food Corporation of India	14	7	5	2	19	9	+10	26	Promotion to Premier Division A
3	West Bengal Police FC	14	6	5	3	16	15	+1	23	Championship Round
4	Aryan	14	5	6	3	15	12	+3	21	Championship Round
5	United	14	2	10	2	11	9	+2	16	Championship Round
6	Kidderpore SC	14	3	8	3	11	10	+1	17	Championship Round
7	Bhowanipore FC	14	5	5	4	15	9	+6	20	Relegation Round
8	Kalighat M.S.	10	3	4	3	7	8	−1	13	Relegation Round
9	SAI	10	2	3	5	5	8	−3	9	Relegation Round
10	Police AC	10	1	5	4	8	11	−3	8	Relegation to First Division
11	Bengal Nagpur Railway	10	2	1	7	8	20	−12	7	Relegation to First Division

Source: Thif-live

=== Results ===
Home \ Away	ARN	BNR	BSC	FCI	GTL	KMS	KSC	PAC	SAI	USC	WBP
Aryan	—	2–0	1–1	0–2	2–2	1–1	2–0	1–0	ABD	0–2	0–0
Bengal Nagpur Railway		—	2–1	1–4	0–3	1–2	0–2	1–3	1–0	0–0	2–3
Bhowanipore			—	0–2	1–1	0–0	2–1	0–0	0–1	1-0	1–2
Food Corporation of India				—	0–0	2–1	0-1	1–0	1–0	0–0	1–1
George Telegraph					—	2–0	2–1	1–0	1–0	0–0	1–1
Kalighat M.S.						—	0–1	0–0	2–0	1–1	3–1
Kidderpore SC							—	3–1	0–0	0–0	0–1
Police A.C.								—	1–1	1–1	2–2
SAI Darjeeling									—	0–2	1–0
United										—	1–1
West Bengal Police											—

Source: Thif-live

Home team won; Match drawn; Away team won; Match ABD

==== Top scorers ====
As of 13 September 2017

Source: kolkatafootball.com

9 goals

- (India) MD. Amirul (FCI)

4 goals

- (India) Subhankar Das (GTL)

3 goals

- (India) Subhankar Sardar (KSC)

2 goals

- (India) Saikat Sarkar (KSC)
- (India) Rajib Swaw (GTL)
- (India) Sibra Narjary (USC)
- (India) Saika Shamim (WBP)
- (India) Suva Kumar (GTL)

1 goal

- (India) Kishore Mollick (WBP)
- (India) Krishanu Banerjee (BNR)
- (India) Abinash Nayek (BNR)
- (India) Rabi Das (BNR)
- (India) Safikul Ali Gayen (BNR)
- (India) Dhananjoy Yadav (ARN)
- (India) Rakesh Karmakar (FCI)
- (India) Amit Kundu (GTL)
- (India) Subrata Biswas (GTL)
- (India) mujafar (KSC)

==== Hat-tricks ====
Player	For	Against	Result	Date
(India) Md. Amirul	FCI	BNR	4–1	21 August 2017
