= 2021 CFL Premier Division =

123rd season of Calcutta Premier Division

CFL Premier Division A
- Season: 2021
- Dates: 17 August – 18 November
- Champions: Mohammedan (12th title)
- Matches: 41
- Goals: 123 (3 per match)
- Best player: Anurag Dhawa
- Top goalscorer: Santosh Baro
- Best goalkeeper: Kuldeep Singh
- Highest scoring: Tollygunge Agragami 2–6 Peerless

The 2021 Calcutta Football League Premier Division A was the 123rd season of the top state-level football league of West Bengal. It was held between mid-August and November 2021. Due to the COVID-19 pandemic, it was decided to cancel Calcutta League last season, but it was played this year.

== Changes from last season ==
=== Rules and regulations ===
- Owing to the COVID-19 pandemic in West Bengal, the tournament format is shortened by adopting a league-cum-knockout format. The 14 participating teams would be divided into two groups and each team would play against all the other teams in their respective groups once. The top three teams from each group would earn a direct quarter final berth. The remaining four teams from each group would play against each other once for the last two quarter final spots. The eight qualified teams would then play knockout matches to reach the final of Premier Division A. From similar reasons ATK Mohun Bagan and East Bengal have not participated.
- The IFA had also increased the number of overseas players a club could register from 4 to 6, but only 2 could be named in the starting eleven.
- The teams were exempted from relegation this season as the lower divisions of CFL were cancelled due to the pandemic.

=== Promoted clubs ===
- United
- Railway
- Tollygunge Agragami
- Kidderpore

=== Relegated clubs ===
- NBP Rainbow
- Kalighat Milan Sangha

== Teams ==
=== Managers and captains ===
Team	Head coach
Aryan	(India) Rajdeep Nandy
Bhawanipore	(India) Sankarlal Chakraborty
BSS	(India) Goutam Ghosh
Calcutta Customs	
George Telegraph	(India) Ranjan Bhattacharjee
Kidderpore	(India) Sanjib Pal
Mohammedan	(Russia) Andrey Chernyshov
Tollygunge Agragami	(India) Bimal Ghosh
Peerless	(India) Subrata Bhattacharya
Railway	(India) Souren Dutta
Southern Samity	(India) Biswajit Bhattacharya
United	(Belgium) Steven Herbots

=== Foreign players ===
Team	Player 1	Player 2	Player 3	Player 4
Aryan	(Cameroon) Aristide Vaillant	(Nigeria) Kareem Omolaja		
Bhawanipore	(Ivory Coast) Kamo Stephane Bayi	(Uganda) Henry Kisekka		
BSS	(Ivory Coast) Léonce Dodoz	(Ivory Coast) Seydou Kourouma		
Calcutta Customs	(Ivory Coast) Gatch Arthure Diomande	(Liberia) Varney Kallon		
George Telegraph	(Nigeria) Echezona Anyichie			
Kidderpore	(Nigeria) Ejiogu Chinedu Emmanuel	(Ghana) Stephen Abeiku		
Mohammedan	(Serbia) Nikola Stojanović	(Serbia) Stefan Ilić	(Trinidad and Tobago) Marcus Joseph	(Syria) Shaher Shaheen
Peerless	(Liberia) Ansumana Kromah	(Sierra Leone) Dixon Alusine	(Cameroon) Romaric Bettat	
Railway	(Ghana) Ben Quansah	(Cameroon) Rayden Gonzo	(Liberia) Kelvin Kollie	
Southern Samity	(Zimbabwe) Victor Kamhuka			
Tollygunge Agragami	(Nigeria) Christopher Chizoba			
United	(Zimbabwe) Dennis	(Zimbabwe) Matthew Tendai		

== Group stage ==
=== Group A ===
Pos	Team	Pld	W	D	L	GF	GA	GD	Pts	Qualification or relegation
1	Bhawanipore	6	4	2	0	14	7	+7	14	Qualified for Quarterfinals
2	BSS	6	4	1	1	13	7	+6	13	Qualified for Quarterfinals
3	United	6	4	1	1	11	5	+6	13	Qualified for Quarterfinals
4	Mohammedan	6	3	1	2	10	5	+5	10	Relegated to Elimination round
5	Railway	6	2	1	3	8	9	−1	7	Relegated to Elimination round
6	Southern Samity	6	1	0	5	7	12	−5	3	Relegated to Elimination round
7	East Bengal	6	0	0	6	0	18	−18	0	Relegated to Elimination round

Updated to match(es) played on 3 September 2021. Source: The Away End

Note: East Bengal withdrew from the league hence the oppositions were awarded walkover of 3 goals.

==== Fixtures and results ====
Home \ Away	MMD	BSS	BFC	RLY	EAB	USC	SSY
Mohammedan	—	0–1	—	2–0	—	2–2	—
BSS	—	—	—	3–1	—	1–3	—
Bhawanipore	2–0	2–2	—	2–2	3–0	2–1	3–2
Railway	—	—	—	—	—	0–1	—
East Bengal	0–3	0–3	—	0–3	—	0–3	0–3
United	—	—	—	—	—	—	—
Southern Samity	0–3	1–3	—	1–2	—	0–1	—

Updated to match(es) played on 5 September 2021. Source: The Away End
Legend: Blue = home team win; Yellow = draw; Red = away team win.

=== Group B ===
Pos	Team	Pld	W	D	L	GF	GA	GD	Pts	Qualification or relegation
1	Peerless	6	4	1	1	14	5	+9	13	Qualified for Quarterfinals
2	Calcutta Customs	6	4	1	1	13	4	+9	13	Qualified for Quarterfinals
3	George Telegraph	6	3	3	0	9	3	+6	12	Qualified for Quarterfinals
4	Aryan	6	2	3	1	9	3	+6	9	Relegated to Elimination round
5	Tollygunge Agragami	6	2	1	3	8	10	−2	7	Relegated to Elimination round
6	Kidderpore	6	1	1	4	6	16	−10	4	Relegated to Elimination round
7	ATK Mohun Bagan	6	0	0	6	0	18	−18	0	Relegated to Elimination round

Updated to match(es) played on 26 August 2021. Source: The Away End

Note: ATK Mohun Bagan withdrew from the league hence the oppositions were awarded walkover of 3 goals.

==== Fixtures and results ====
Home \ Away	PRL	ARN	TAG	AMB	CCU	GTL	KSC
Peerless	—	—	—	—	1–0	—	4–1
Aryan	0–0	—	0–0	3–0	0–1	1–1	5–1
Tollygunge Agragami	2–6	—	—	3–0	2–3	0–1	1–0
ATK Mohun Bagan	0–3	—	—	—	0–3	0–3	0–3
Calcutta Customs	—	—	—	—	—	—	—
George Telegraph	2–0	—	—	—	1–1	—	1–1
Kidderpore	—	—	—	—	0–5	—	—

Updated to match(es) played on 26 August 2021. Source: The Away End
Legend: Blue = home team win; Yellow = draw; Red = away team win.

== Elimination round ==
Play-off round 1
Mohammedan	w/o
ATK Mohun Bagan
Tollygunge Agragami	2; 5(p)
Southern Samity	2; 4(p)

Play-off round 2
Mohammedan	3
Tollygunge Agragami	1

Play-off round 1
Aryan	w/o
East Bengal
Railway	5
Kidderpore	0

Play-off round 2
Aryan	0; 2(p)
Railway	0; 4(p)

== Knockout stage ==
Quarter-finals
1 October 2021 – Kalyani
BSS	1
George Telegraph	2
5 October 2021 – Naihati Stadium
Peerless	0
Railway	4
2 October 2021 – Naihati Stadium
United	3
Calcutta Customs	2
9 October 2021 – Kalyani
Bhawanipore	0
Mohammedan	7

Semi-finals
8 October 2021 - Naihati Stadium
George Telegraph	0
Railway (a.e.t.)	1
12 October 2021 - Kalyani
United	0
Mohammedan	1

Final
18 November 2021 - Salt Lake Stadium
Railway	0
Mohammedan	1

== See also ==
- 2021–22 season in state football leagues of India
