= 2016–17 Indian Federation Cup group stage =

The 2016–17 Indian Federation Cup group stage took place between 7 May 2017 and 12 May 2017. Aizawl and East Bengal qualified from group A, whereas Mohun Bagan and Bengaluru FC qualified from group B.

== Group A ==
Pos	Team	Pld	W	D	L	GF	GA	GD	Pts	Qualification
1	Aizawl	3	2	1	0	5	3	+2	7	Advance to semi-finals
2	East Bengal	3	1	2	0	3	1	+2	5	Advance to semi-finals
3	Chennai City	3	1	0	2	5	6	−1	3	
4	Churchill Brothers	3	0	1	2	3	6	−3	1	

Source: AIFF

=== Fixtures and results ===
7 May 2017
16:00 IST

East Bengal	1–1	Churchill Brothers
Wedson 66'	Report	Kromah 81'

Barabati Stadium, Cuttack
7 May 2017
19:00 IST

Aizawl	3–2	Chennai City
Amnah 53'; Laldanmawia 62', 81'	Report	Charles 13'; Edwin 39'

Barabati Stadium, Cuttack

9 May 2017
16:00 IST

Chennai City	0–2	East Bengal
	Report	Robin Singh 45+1', 77' (pen.)

Barabati Stadium, Cuttack
9 May 2017
19:00 IST

Churchill Brothers	1–2	Aizawl
Kromah 84' (pen.)	Report	Lalramchullova 21' (pen.); Laldanmawia 90'

Barabati Stadium, Cuttack

11 May 2017
16:00 IST

Chennai City	3–1	Churchill Brothers
Ganesh 18'; Edwin 61'; Charles 79'	Report	Brandon 81'

Barabati Stadium, Cuttack
11 May 2017
19:00 IST

Aizawl	0–0	East Bengal
	Report

Barabati Stadium, Cuttack

== Group B ==
Pos	Team	Pld	W	D	L	GF	GA	GD	Pts	Qualification
1	Mohun Bagan	3	2	1	0	8	3	+5	7	Advance to semi-finals
2	Bengaluru FC	3	1	1	1	4	5	−1	4	Advance to semi-finals
3	Shillong Lajong	3	1	0	2	7	8	−1	3	
4	DSK Shivajians	3	1	0	2	4	7	−3	3	

Source: AIFF

=== Fixtures and results ===
8 May 2017
16:00 IST

Bengaluru FC	3–2	Shillong Lajong
Udanta 35'; Lyngdoh 46'; Khongjee 74' (o.g.)	Report	Kinowaki 72'; S.Lalmuanpuia 84' (pen.)

Barabati Stadium, Cuttack
8 May 2017
19:00 IST

Mohun Bagan	4–0	DSK Shivajians
B.Singh 24', 71'; Duffy 65'; Jeje 90+2'	Report

Barabati Stadium, Cuttack

10 May 2017
16:00 IST

DSK Shivajians	2–0	Bengaluru FC
Quero 71', 76'	Report

Barabati Stadium, Cuttack
10 May 2017
19:00 IST

Mohun Bagan	3–2	Shillong Lajong
Duffy 5'; Yusa 27'; Norde 43'	Report	Kotal 3'; Kinowaki 80'

Barabati Stadium, Cuttack

12 May 2017
16:00 IST

DSK Shivajians	2–3	Shillong Lajong
Narzary 64', 86'	Report	Deory 49'; Redeem 68'; S.Lalmuanpuia 90+2'

Barabati Stadium, Cuttack
12 May 2017
19:00 IST

Mohun Bagan	1–1	Bengaluru FC
Norde 50'	Report	Alwyn 11'

Barabati Stadium, Cuttack
