= Joby Justin =

Indian footballer (born 1993)

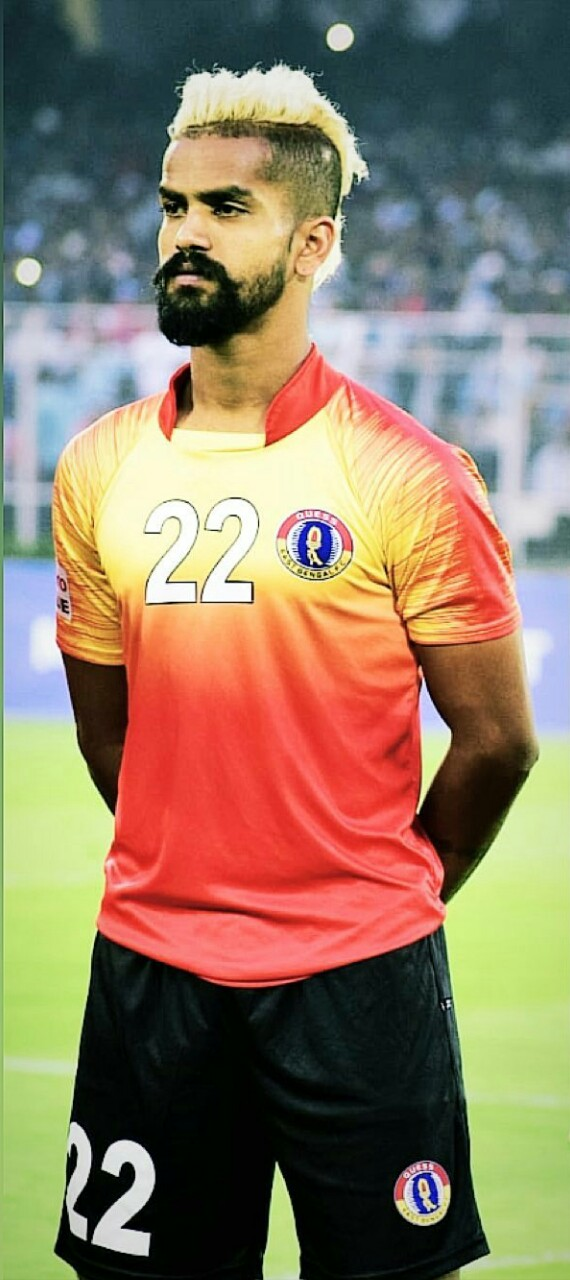
- Joby Justin with East Bengal

Personal information
- Date of birth: 10 November 1993 (age 33)
- Place of birth: Thiruvananthapuram, Kerala, India
- Positions: Striker; winger

Team information
- Current team: Gokulam Kerala
- Number: 22

Youth career
- St Mary's Club
- Kerala University
- Travancore Titanium
- Kerala State Football Team
- KSEB FC

Senior career*
Years	Team	Apps	(Gls)
2017–2019	East Bengal	39	(16)
2019–2020	ATK	10	(1)
2020–2021	Mohun Bagan	0	(0)
2021–2023	Chennaiyin	8	(0)
2023	Gokulam Kerala	9	(1)
2023	Bhawanipore	10	(8)
2023–2026	Diamond Harbour	26	(7)

International career
2019	India	3	(0)
- * Club domestic league appearances and goals

Joby Justin (born 10 November 1993) is an Indian professional footballer who plays as a forward for Gokulam Kerala.

== Career ==
Justin grew up playing football on the beaches of Vettucaud but did not take the game seriously until his eighth standard when he joined St Joseph's HSS. Playing for St Mary's Club, he was already being noticed in the city's football circles. After joining MG College, Justin continued to appear in tournaments including TNIE GOAL 2013.

After joining KSEB, he made the switch from the flanks as a wing back to the midfield. He then represented Kerala football team in the Santhosh Trophy where he started to play as a center forward.

=== East Bengal ===
==== 2017–2018 season ====
On 18 July 2017 East Bengal signed Justin along with goalkeeper Mirshad Michu for the 2017–18 I-League season. On 28 August 2018 Justin made his debut for the club in the 2017–18 Calcutta Premier Division match against Railways. He scored in the 3rd minute of the game to give the Red and Gold brigade an early lead and there by winning the game 3–0.

On 2 January 2018 Justin made his professional debut as he was included in the starting eleven against Indian Arrows in the 2017–18 I-League. An injury to Trinidad and Tobago striker Willis Plaza opened the doors for him to the first 11. He returned the trust shown in him by coach Khalid Jamil by scoring in the next two fixtures against Churchill Brothers and Minerva Punjab. He made a total of 9 appearances in the season.

==== 2018–2019 season ====
Justin extended his stay at the Kolkata club for another season. On 1 November 2018 He scored a brace against Shillong Lajong in a 1–3 away win. He improved significantly after Menendez took charge of East Bengal.

Justin was involved in 12 goals (eight goals and four assists), which counts for more than 50 per cent of East Bengal's total goals (23) scored in the season.

He scored in both derby matches.

On 26 February 2019, Justin was handed an interim suspension along with Aizawl’s Kareem Nurain for an incident during Eastbengal' home game against Aizawl FC. Justin was found guilty of spitting on Nurain after a second-half tackle, while the Nigerian was found guilty for fighting with East Bengal defender Borja Gomez.

On 5 March 2019 the AIFF's disciplinary committee imposed a fine of Rs 1 lakh on Justin, along with the six-match suspension.

=== ATK ===
On 3 April 2019, Justin joined Indian Super League club ATK on a three-year deal. He made 9 appearances and scored one goal for the club and won the league title that year.

=== ATK Mohun Bagan ===
On 3 August 2020, Justin signed a two-year deal for the newly merged club ATK Mohun Bagan FC for their upcoming ISL season. However he suffered an ACL injury during training and is ruled out of the competition.

=== Chennaiyin FC ===
In 2021, Justin signed a three-year deal with Chennaiyin FC for new ISL season. There he made 8 appearances for the club scoring none.

=== Diamond Harbour FC ===
After short spells in Gokulam Kerala and Bhawanipore, Justin joined Diamond Harbour FC under Kibu Vicuna in 2023. The club had a fantastic run with back to back promotions in national level competitions from I-League 3 to I-League. Justin made 26 appearances and scored 7 goals in total for the club regaining his form back.

== International career ==
In May 2019, Justin was named in the 37-men probables list for 2019 King's Cup by the newly appointed coach Igor Štimac. However he was dropped from the final squad.

In July 2019, Justin was named in the final squad for 2019 Intercontinental Cup. He made his debut in a 2–4 loss against Tajikistan, replacing Sunil Chhetri at the 88th minute of the game, playing the last 6 minutes of the game.

Justin got his first start for the National team in the following Intercontinental Cup match against DPR Korea, playing 54 minutes before getting substituted.

== Career statistics ==
=== Club ===
As of 28 July 2025

Club	Season	League			Cup		AFC		Others		Total	
Club	Season	Division	Apps	Goals	Apps	Goals	Apps	Goals	Apps	Goals	Apps	Goals
East Bengal	2017–18	I-League	9	2	2 (Note: Appearance(s) in Super Cup)	0	—		—		11	2
East Bengal	2018–19	I-League	17	9	0	0	—		—		17	9
East Bengal	Total		26	11	2	0	0	0	0	0	28	11
ATK	2019–20	Indian Super League	10	1	0	0	—		—		10	1
Mohun Bagan	2020–21	Indian Super League	0	0	0	0	—		—		0	0
Chennaiyin	2021–22	Indian Super League	3	0	0	0	—		—		3	0
Chennaiyin	2022–23	Indian Super League	5	0	0	0	—		2 (Note: Appearance(s) in Durand Cup)	0	7	0
Chennaiyin	Total		8	0	0	0	0	0	2	0	10	0
Gokulam Kerala	2022–23	I-League	9	1	4	0	—		—		13	1
Diamond Habour	2023–24	I-League 3	4	1	—		—		—		4	1
Diamond Habour	2024–25	I-League 3	8	2	—		—		—		8	2
Diamond Habour	2024–25	I-League 2	14	4	—		—		—		14	4
Diamond Habour	2025–26	I-League	0	0	0	0	—		2 (Note: 1 appearance in Durand Cup and 1 appearance in Calcutta Football League)	1	2	1
Diamond Habour	Total		26	7	0	0	0	0	2	1	28	8
Total			79	20	6	0	0	0	4	1	89	21

=== International ===
As of 16 July 2019

National team	Year	Apps	Goals
India	2019	3	0
Total		3	0

== Honours ==
=== Club ===
KSEB

- Kerala Premier League: 2016–17

East Bengal FC

- Calcutta Football League: 2017–18
- Super Cup: 2018 Runners-up

ATK

- Indian Super League : 2019–20

Diamond Harbour

- I-League 3 : 2024–25

=== Personal ===
- Quess EBFC Player of the Month (2): November 2018, December 2018
