= Armand Bazié =

Ivorian footballer (born 1992)

Personal information
- Full name: Armand Bazié
- Date of birth: 20 March 1992 (age 34)
- Place of birth: Ivory Coast
- Height: 1.85 m (6 ft 1 in)
- Position: Midfielder

Senior career*
Years	Team	Apps	(Gls)
2016–2017	Rainbow	11	(3)
2017–2018	East Bengal	12	(0)
2018	Minerva Punjab	4	(1)
2018	Mohammedan	11	(0)
2018–2020	Real Kashmir	34	(5)
2020–2021	Churchill Brothers	15	(0)
2021	Abu Salem	11	(0)
2021–2022	Aizawl		
2022–2024	Abu Salem		
2024–2025	Abu Muslim		
2026	Gokulam Kerala		
2026	Samaleswari		
- * Club domestic league appearances and goals

Armand Bazié (born March 20, 1992) is an Ivorian professional footballer who plays as a midfielder.

== Career ==
Known for his dogged displays in the middle of the park, Bazié began his career in India with Rainbow AC in 2017–18 Calcutta Premier Division. His good performance in the CFL caught the attention of East Bengal officials, and he was signed by East Bengal ahead of the 2017–18 I-League season.

For some problems (salary), East Bengal released Bazié in January 2018, after losing twice against arch-rivals Mohun Bagan in I-League.

After a fruitful short stint with Minerva Punjab, he returned to Kolkata and joined Mohammedan Sporting for the 2018–19 CFL.

In September 2018, Bazie signed with newly promoted I-League club Real Kashmir F.C. where he has played almost all matches in 2018–19 season and scored 6goals. His brilliant performance in season 2018–19 season earned him a contract for season 2019–20.

On 20 October 2020, Bazie signed with Goan team Churchill Brothers for 2020–21 season of I-League. Bazie was named captain of the team for entire season and Churchill Brothers finished runner up in I-League.

In April 2021, Bazie was signed by a Libyan Premier League team Abu Salem for second half of the season.

== Personal life ==
His brother, Kamo Stephane Bayi, is also a professional footballer. Both of them started their professional career in India.

== Career statistics ==
=== Club ===
As of 3 March 2022

Club	Season	League			Cup		Continental		Total	
Club	Season	Division	Apps	Goals	Apps	Goals	Apps	Goals	Apps	Goals
East Bengal	2017–18	I-League	12	0	0	0	—		12	0
Minerva Punjab	2017–18	I-League	4	1	1 (Note: Appearances in the Super Cup)	0	—		5	1
Real Kashmir	2018–19	I-League	19	3	1	0	—		20	3
Real Kashmir	2019–20	I-League	15	2	4 (Note: Appearances in the Durand Cup)	0	—		19	2
Churchill Brothers	2020–21	I-League	15	0	0	0	—		15	0
Aizawl	2021–22	I-League	0	0	0	0	—		0	0
Career total			65	6	6	0	0	0	71	6

== Honours ==
Minerva Punjab

- I-League: 2017–18

Churchill Brothers

- I-League: 2020–21
