= Lalramchullova =

Indian footballer (born 1996)

Personal information
- Full name: Lalramchullova Pautu
- Date of birth: 14 January 1995 (age 31)
- Place of birth: Mizoram, India
- Height: 1.65 m (5 ft 5 in)
- Position: Left back

Youth career
- Armed Veng
- 2012–2013: Kulikawn
- 2013–2014: Luangmual

Senior career*
Years	Team	Apps	(Gls)
2014–2017	Aizawl	30	(1)
2017–2019	East Bengal	32	(1)
2019–2020	Mohun Bagan	5	(0)
2020–2021	East Bengal	0	(0)
2021–2022	Mohammedan	12	(0)
- * Club domestic league appearances and goals as of 20:21, 23 April 2022 (UTC)

Lalramchullova Pautu (born 14 January 1996) is an Indian professional footballer who plays as a defender for Mohammedan in the I-League.

== Career ==
Born in Mizoram, Lalramchullova started his career with Aizawl. He made his professional debut for Aizawl in the I-League on 9 January 2016 against the reigning champions, Mohun Bagan. He came on as an 80th-minute substitute as Aizawl lost 3–1.

=== East Bengal ===
He joined East Bengal in 2017 and became a regular starter for the team. He spent two season with the red and gold brigade before moving on to join arch-rivals Mohun Bagan in 2019.

=== Mohun Bagan ===
He joined Mohun Bagan for a season in 2019, but failed to get much game time in their title winning campaign.

=== Back to East Bengal ===
On 13 April 2020, the East Bengal club announced the signing of Lalramchullova back from arch-rivals Mohun Bagan for the upcoming season.

== Career statistics ==
=== Club ===
As of 23 April 2022

Club	Season	League			Cup		Others		AFC		Total	
Club	Season	Division	Apps	Goals	Apps	Goals	Apps	Goals	Apps	Goals	Apps	Goals
Aizawl	2015–16	I-League	15	0	1 (Note: Appearances in Federation Cup)	0	—		—		16	0
Aizawl	2016–17	I-League	15	1	3	1	—		—		18	2
Aizawl	Aizawl total		30	1	4	1	0	0	0	0	34	2
East Bengal	2017–18	I-League	14	0	4 (Note: Appearance(s) in Super Cup)	0	8 (Note: Appearance(s) in Calcutta Football League)	0	—		26	0
East Bengal	2018–19	I-League	18	1	0	0	9	1	—		27	2
East Bengal	East Bengal total		32	1	4	0	17	1	0	0	53	2
Mohun Bagan	2019–20	I-League	5	0	0	0	13 (Note: Appearance(s) in Sheikh Kamal International Club Cup)	0	—		18	0
East Bengal	2020–21	Indian Super League	0	0	0	0	0	0	—		0	0
Mohammedan	2021–22	I-League	12	0	6 (Note: Appearance(s) in Durand Cup)	0	0	0	—		18	0
Career total			79	2	14	1	30	1	0	0	123	4

== Honours ==
=== Club ===
Aizawl FC

- I-League (1): 2016–17

East Bengal FC

- Calcutta Football League (1): 2017–18

Mohun Bagan

- I-League (1): 2019–20

Mohammedan Sporting

- Calcutta Football League (1): 2021
