= Alfred Ndyenge =

Namibian footballer (born 1983)

Personal information
- Date of birth: January 21, 1983 (age 43)
- Place of birth: Tsumeb, Namibia
- Position: Striker

Senior career*
Years	Team	Apps	(Gls)
–2006	Robber Chanties		
2006–2007	Alfreton Town FC		
2007–2008	FC Bolsover		
2008	Nordvärmlands FF	3	(0)
2009	Chief Santos		
2009–2010	FC Civics Windhoek	12	(3)
2010–2011	SK Windhoek	13	(4)
2011	Ramblers FC		
2012	Southern Samity		
2013–2014	Ramblers FC		
2014–2016	Chief Santos		

International career
2010–2011	Namibia	3	(0)
- * Club domestic league appearances and goals

Alfred Ndyenge (born 21 January 1983) is a Namibian former footballer.

== Early life ==
Ndyenge was born in Tsumeb and attended Chesterfield College in England, where he studied sports management.

== Career ==
Ndyenge started his career with Namibian side Robber Chanties. He played for Oshikoto Region. He helped the team achieve second place at the Namibian Newspaper Cup. In 2006, he signed for English side Alfreton Town FC. In 2007, he signed for English side FC Bolsover. In 2008, he signed for Swedish side Nordvärmlands FF. In 2009, he signed for Namibian side Chief Santos. After that, he signed for Namibian side FC Civics Windhoek. After that, he signed for Namibian side SK Windhoek. In 2011, he signed for Namibian side Ramblers FC. In 2012, he signed for Indian side Southern Samity. In 2013, he returned to Namibian side Ramblers FC. In 2014, he returned to Namivian side Chief Santos.

== Style of play ==
Ndyenge mainly operated as a striker. He could operate as a midfielder or winger. He was described as "athletic-built".

== Post-playing career ==
After retiring from professional football, Ndyenge founded a sportswear company. It was described as "gained popularity among local sportswear enthusiasts".

== Personal life ==
Ndyenge has been nicknamed "Alfie". He is known by that name in his hometown.
