= Samad Ali Mallick =

Indian footballer (born 1994)

Personal information
- Full name: Samad Ali Mallick
- Date of birth: 30 September 1994 (age 32)
- Place of birth: Gopalpur, West Bengal, India
- Height: 1.70 m (5 ft 7 in)
- Position: Right-back

Team information
- Current team: Bhawanipore
- Number: 25

Youth career
- NBP Rainbow

Senior career*
Years	Team	Apps	(Gls)
2015–2021	East Bengal	36	(0)
2021	RoundGlass Punjab	8	(0)
2021–2022	Sreenidi Deccan	3	(0)
2022–2025	Mohammedan	17	(0)
2025–	Bhawanipore	0	(0)

International career
2016	India U23		
- * Club domestic league appearances and goals as of 23:44, 3 January 2025 (UTC)

Samad Ali Mallick (Bengali: সামাদ আলী মল্লিক; born 30 September 1994) is an Indian professional footballer who plays as a defender for Bhawanipore.

== Career ==
Mallik started his career with then Calcutta Football League third division side, NBP Rainbow, before signing for East Bengal He played for East Bengal in the Calcutta Football League. He made his professional debut for the club on 10 January 2016 in the I-League against Sporting Goa. He started the match and played the full match as East Bengal won 3–1.

== Career statistics ==
=== Club ===
As of 2 May 2022

Club	Season	League			CFL		Cup		AFC		Total	
Club	Season	Division	Apps	Goals	Apps	Goals	Apps	Goals	Apps	Goals	Apps	Goals
East Bengal	2015–16	I-League	6	0	6	0	0	0	–		12	0
East Bengal	2016–17	I-League	0	0	4	0	1 (Note: Appearance(s) in Federation Cup)	0	–		5	0
East Bengal	2017–18	I-League	4	0	8	1	4 (Note: Appearance(s) in Super Cup)	0	–		16	1
East Bengal	2018–19	I-League	14	0	9	1	0	0	–		23	1
East Bengal	2019–20	I-League	12	0	7	0	2 (Note: Appearance(s) in Durand Cup)	1	–		21	1
East Bengal	2020–21	Indian Super League	0	0	–		0	0	–		0	0
East Bengal	East Bengal total		36	0	34	2	7	1	0	0	77	3
RoundGlass Punjab	2020–21	I-League	8	0	–		0	0	–		8	0
Sreenidi Deccan	2021–22	I-League	3	0	–		0	0	–		3	0
Mohammedan	2022–23	I-League	0	0	–		0	0	–		0	0
Career total			47	0	34	2	7	1	0	0	88	3

== Honours ==
India U23

- South Asian Games Silver medal: 2016

Mohammedan

- I-League: 2023–24
