= Kamo Stephane Bayi =

Ivorian footballer

Personal information
- Full name: Kamo Stephane Bayi
- Date of birth: 17 August 1996 (age 30)
- Place of birth: Ivory Coast
- Position: Striker

Youth career
- Akwa Starlets

Senior career*
Years	Team	Apps	(Gls)
2016	George Telegraph	16	(19)
2016	Salgaocar	12	(8)
2017	Aizawl	17	(6)
2017	Mohun Bagan		
2017–2018	Gokulam Kerala	3	(1)
2018	Mohammedan	11	(2)
2018–2019	Tollygunge Agragami	11	(2)
2019–2020	Bhawanipore	10	(3)
2020–2021	FS Stars		
2021	San Pédro		
2022	Eastern Railway		
2022–2023	Churchill Brothers	5	(2)
2023	NEROCA	12	(1)
2024–2025	Real Kashmir		
2025	Abu Muslim		
2026	JHR Royal City		
- * Club domestic league appearances and goals

Kamo Stephane Bayi (born August 17, 1996) is an Ivorian professional footballer who plays as a forward.

== Career ==
Bayi was born in the Ivory Coast, but started his career in Nigeria with Akwa Starlets. In 2016, he moved to India to play for Calcutta Football League side George Telegraph. After the Kolkata season was complete, Bayi moved to another Indian state, Goa, to play for Goa Professional League side Salgaocar.

=== Aizawl ===
On 2 January 2017, Bayi signed with Aizawl of the I-League. He made his debut for the club on 7 January in their league opener against East Bengal. He started and played the whole match, as Aizawl drew 1–1.

=== Mohun Bagan ===
In June 2017, Bayi signed for Mohun Bagan for the Calcutta Football League. He made his debut for the Mariners on 19 August 2017 in their 5–2 win against Pathachakra, in which he scored a hat-trick.

=== Gokulam Kerala ===
On 19 November 2017, it was announced that Kamo has signed for the new entrants of I-League, Gokulam Kerala for 2017–18 season.

== Personal life ==
His brother, Armand Bazié, is also a professional footballer. Both of them started their professional career in India.

== Career statistics ==
=== Club ===
As of 11 March 2023

Club	Season	League			League Cup		Domestic Cup		Continental		Total	
Club	Season	Division	Apps	Goals	Apps	Goals	Apps	Goals	Apps	Goals	Apps	Goals
Aizawl	2016–17	I-League	17	6	3 (Note: Appearance(s) in Federation Cup)	0	0	0	—		20	6
Mohun Bagan	2017–18	Calcutta Football League	8	7	0	0	0	0	—		8	7
Gokulam Kerala	2017–18	I-League	3	1	0	0	0	0	—		3	1
Churchill Brothers	2022–23	I-League	5	2	0	0	0	0	—		5	2
NEROCA	2022–23	I-League	12	1	0	0	0	0	—		12	1
Real Kashmir	2023–24	I-League	0	0	0	0	0	0	—		0	0
Career total			45	17	3	0	0	0	0	0	48	17

== Honours ==
Aizawl

- I-League: 2016–17
