= Comercial Futebol Clube (Ribeirão Preto) =

Brazilian association football club

Comercial-SP
- Full name: Comercial Futebol Clube
- Nicknames: Bafo; Leão do Norte
- Founded: October 10, 1911; 115 years ago
- Ground: Palma Travassos
- Capacity: 18,277
- President: Ademir Chiari
- Head coach: Fahel Júnior
- League: Campeonato Paulista Série A4
- 2025: Paulista Série A3, 16th of 16 (relegated)
- Website: www.comercial-fc.com.br
Home colors	Away colors	Third colors

Comercial Futebol Clube (SP), commonly referred to as Comercial de Ribeirão Preto or simply as Comercial, is a professional association football club based in the city of Ribeirão Preto, São Paulo, Brazil. The team participates in the Campeonato Paulista Série A4, the fourth tier of the São Paulo state football league.

The club's home colours are white and black and the team mascot is a lion.

== History ==
On October 10, 1911, some business owners from Ribeirão Preto founded Commercial Football Club and the club soon became very wealthy. The field from Estádio da Rua Tibiriçá was one of the first in Brazil to receive grass, because the club's supporters complained of the dust in the air during the games. In 1936, the club has experienced a financial crisis and the Football Department was closed. In 1956, Commercial merged with Paineiras and become Comercial Football Club, entering the second division from Campeonato Paulista that same year.

In 1958, Comercial won its first title, the Campeonato Paulista Second Level, beating Corinthians of Presidente Prudente in the final. The club was promoted to the following year's first level.

In 1978, the club competed in the Campeonato Brasileiro Série A for the first time. The club finished in the 42nd position.

In 1979, the club competed in the Campeonato Brasileiro Série A for the second time. The club finished in the 14th position, ahead of clubs like Grêmio, Fluminense and Botafogo (RJ).

=== Notable players ===
- Alex Muralha
- Belmácio Pousa Godinho
- Diego Ribas
- Émerson Leão
- Mauricinho
- Pedro Omar

== Current squad ==
Note: Flags indicate national team as defined under FIFA eligibility rules; some limited exceptions apply. Players may hold more than one non-FIFA nationality.

No.	Pos.	Nation	Player
—	GK	BRA	João Guilherme
—	GK	BRA	Marcelo Henrique
—	DF	BRA	Léo Carioca
—	DF	BRA	Dourado
—	DF	BRA	Everton Morelli
—	DF	BRA	Willian Luiz Antonio Bernardo da Silva
—	DF	BRA	Bruno Alves
—	DF	BRA	Luiz Eduardo
—	DF	BRA	Luanderson
—	MF	BRA	Gimenez
—	MF	BRA	Léo Japa
—	MF	BRA	Matheus Magagnin
—	MF	BRA	Lucas Sorriso
—	MF	BRA	Zé Artur
—	MF	BRA	Thiago Silva

No.	Pos.	Nation	Player
—	MF	BRA	Richard
—	MF	BRA	Marcos Rinaldi
—	MF	BRA	Matheus Rinaldi
—	MF	BRA	Patrick
—	MF	BRA	Vitor
—	MF	BRA	Mirray
—	MF	POL	Roger Guerreiro
—	FW	BRA	Edson
—	FW	BRA	Paulo Henrique
—	FW	BRA	Cassiano Bodini
—	FW	BRA	Igor Carioca
—	FW	BRA	Rodrigo Jesus
—	FW	BRA	Charles
—	FW	BRA	Felipe Napolitano
—	FW	BRA	Marques

== Honours ==
=== Official tournaments ===
State
Competitions	Titles	Seasons
Campeonato Paulista Série A2	1	1958

=== Others tournaments ===
==== International ====
- Carlos Joel Nelli Trophy (1): 1965

==== Inter-state ====
- Copa Ribeirão Preto (2): 1965, 1967

==== State ====
- Torneio José Ermirio de Moraes Filho (2): 1973, 1981

==== City ====
- Troféu Marechal Castelo Branco (1): 1970
- Taça Welson Gasparini (1): 1992
- Taça Prefeitura Municipal de Ribeirão Preto (1): 1918

=== Runners-up ===
- Copa Paulista (1): 2011
- Campeonato Paulista Série A2 (3): 1918, 1921, 1993
- Campeonato Paulista Série A3 (1): 2022
- Campeonato Paulista Série A4 (1): 2018

== Stadium ==
Comercial's home stadium is Estádio Dr. Francisco de Palma Travassos, nicknamed Jóia (Jewel), inaugurated in 1964, with a maximum capacity of 35,000 people.

The club also owns a training ground, named Centro de Treinamento Francisco de Palma Travassos.

== The derby ==
Comercial's rival is Botafogo (SP). The match between the two clubs is nicknamed Come-Fogo (truncation of Comercial and Botafogo). It is one of the oldest Brazilian derbies and some matches have had an attendance of over 30,000 people. Famous footballers, like Sócrates, Raí and Zé Mário played the derby. The derby is disputed not only in football, but also in basketball.

== Club colors ==
The club's official club colors are black and white. The club's home kit is all white.

== Mascot ==
Comercial's mascot is a lion, called Leão, which is the Portuguese word for lion.

== Nickname ==
The club is nicknamed Bafo, meaning Breath, and Leão do Norte, meaning Lion of the North.
