= Mirray =

Brazilian footballer

Personal information
- Full name: Mirray Leme Vieira
- Date of birth: 9 January 1994 (age 32)
- Place of birth: Jaboticabal, Brazil
- Height: 1.76 m (5 ft 9 in)
- Position: Midfielder

Youth career
- 2007–2015: São Paulo

Senior career*
Years	Team	Apps	(Gls)
2015	São Paulo	0	(0)
2015	→ Nacional-SP (loan)		
2015	→ São Bento (loan)		
2016	Vila Nova		
2016	Coimbra		
2017	Comercial-SP		
2018	Luverdense		
2019	Patrocinense		
2019	URT		
2020	Barretos		
2020–2021	Gama		
2021	Goytacaz		
- * Club domestic league appearances and goals

Mirray Leme Vieira (born 9 January 1994), simply known as Mirray, is a Brazilian former professional footballer who played as a midfielder.

== Career ==
Revealed in the youth sectors of São Paulo, the player expected to become a great player at this generation, with a contract with a termination fine of R$ 30 million. In 2013 he participated in the traditional Copa São Paulo de Futebol Jr., unfortunately being responsible for the elimination of São Paulo against Goiás in that edition. He suffered a serious knee injury while still in the youth categories, which made the situation change drastically, playing only for modest teams in Brazilian football.

In 2025, he revealed that the main reason for abandoning football was the successive delays in payments, a reality in lower divisions clubs.
