= Habib Kavuma =

Ugandan footballer (born 1991)

Personal information
- Date of birth: 4 September 1991 (age 35)
- Place of birth: Makindye, Uganda
- Height: 1.75 m (5 ft 9 in)
- Position: Defender

Team information
- Current team: SC Villa

Senior career*
Years	Team	Apps	(Gls)
2008–2011	Bunamwaya		
2011–2012	APR		
2012–2018	Kampala Capital City Authority		
2018–2022	SC Villa		
2022–	Southern Samity		

International career^{‡}
2009–	Uganda	22	(1)
- * Club domestic league appearances and goals as of 11:52, 12 August 2019 (UTC) ‡ National team caps and goals as of 11:52, 12 August 2019 (UTC)

Habib Kavuma (born 4 September 1991) is an Ugandan professional footballer who plays for Southern Samity, as a defender.

== Career ==
Born in Makindye, Kavuma has played club football in Uganda and Rwanda for Bunamwaya, APR, Kampala Capital City Authority and SC Villa. In July 2022, it was officially announced that Kavuma signed with CFL Premier Division side Southern Samity in India.

He made his international debut for Uganda in 2009.
