= Surabuddin Mollick =

Indian footballer (born 1992)

Personal information
- Date of birth: 4 May 1992 (age 34)
- Place of birth: Budge Budge, India
- Position: Midfielder

Youth career
- 2008–2009: Dempo

Senior career*
Years	Team	Apps	(Gls)
2012–2013	ONGC	15	(2)
2014–2015	Bhawanipore		
2015–2016	Churchill Brothers	8	(1)
2016–2018	East Bengal	27	(3)
2019–2020	Mohun Bagan	10	(0)
2020	Southern Samity		
- * Club domestic league appearances and goals

Surabuddin Mollick (Bengali: সুরবুদ্দিন মল্লিক; born 4 May 1992) is an Indian footballer who plays as a midfielder.

== Career ==
=== Early career ===
Mollick started his career with George Telegraph in the Calcutta Premier Division in 2008 before joining Mohammedan in 2009 and Mohun Bagan in 2010.

=== ONGC ===
Mollick then joined ONGC F.C. of the I-League in 2012, and made his debut for the club on 21 September 2012 against Kalighat MS in the 2012 Indian Federation Cup in which ONGC won 5–1. He then scored his first goal for the club on 16 November 2012 against reigning I-League champions Dempo S.C. at the Ambedkar Stadium in Delhi in the 12th minute as ONGC went on to win surprisingly 3–1 over the champions.

=== Bhawanipore ===
After ONGC were relegated from the I-League, Mollick returned to Kolkata to sign with Bhawanipore.

== I-League statistics ==
As of 29 May 2016

Club	Season	League			League Cup		Domestic Cup		Continental		Total	
Club	Season	Division	Apps	Goals	Apps	Goals	Apps	Goals	Apps	Goals	Apps	Goals
ONGC	2012–13	I-League	15	2	—	—	—	—	—	—	15	2
Career total			15	2	0	0	0	0	0	0	15	2
