= Sankarlal Chakraborty =

Indian footballer (born 1975)

Personal information
- Full name: Sankarlal Chakraborty
- Date of birth: 12 December 1975 (age 50)
- Place of birth: Kolkata, India
- Positions: Midfielder; defender

Youth career
- TFA

Senior career*
Years	Team	Apps	(Gls)
1996–1997	Mohun Bagan	32	(4)
1997–2003	East Bengal	204	(8)

Managerial career
- 2012–2014: IFA Academy (assistant)
- 2014–2018: Mohun Bagan (assistant)
- 2018–2019: Mohun Bagan
- 2019–2020: Bhawanipore
- 2020-2021: Mohammedan
- 2021-2022: Bhawanipore
- 2022–2023: Sudeva Delhi
- 2023–2024: Bengaluru United
- 2024-: Punjab FC (assistant)
- * Club domestic league appearances and goals

Sankarlal Chakraborty (born 12 December 1975) is an Indian professional football coach and former player.

== Playing career ==
Sankarlal Chakraborty is a Tata Football Academy graduate. He joined Mohun Bagan as a footballer in the year of 1996. He also played for East Bengal F.C. At his East Bengal career, he broke his leg while trying to tackle Chima Okorie during a Kolkata Derby in August 1997. He was a midfielder. His playing career ended in 2002–03 after getting injured heavily.

== Coaching career ==
=== IFA Academy ===
He took to coaching at the academy of the Indian Football Association in 2012.

=== Mohun Bagan ===
He had been pursuing his coaching career at Mohun Bagan since 2014, before getting promoted to head coach. He worked under Subhash Bhowmick and Sanjoy Sen as an assistant coach. He got the opportunity to manage Mohun Bagan as a head coach during Calcutta Football League in 2017. He takes over as a head coach for Mohun Bagan in I-League in place of Sanjoy Sen in 2018.

=== Sudeva Delhi ===
On 14 December 2022, Sudeva Delhi officially unveiled Chakraborty as their new head coach. After end of the season, the club relegated from I-League.

=== Bengaluru United ===
On 3 August 2023, Bengaluru United officially announced that they have signed Chakraborty as new head coach.

== Achievements ==
=== Player ===
East Bengal

- IFA Shield: 2002

=== Manager ===
Mohun Bagan

- Calcutta Football League: 2018–19

Punjab (R)

- Reliance Foundation Development League: 2023–24
