= Eduardo Ferreira =

Equatoguinean footballer (born 1983)

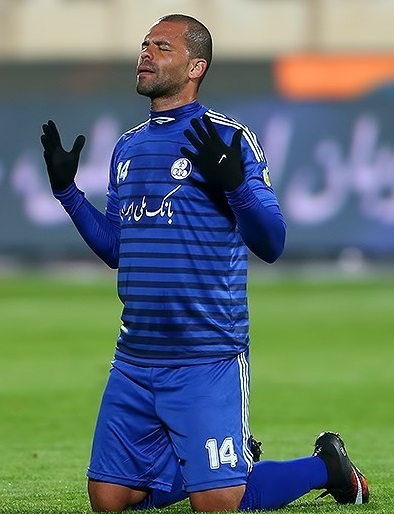

Personal information
- Full name: Eduardo Soares Ferreira
- Date of birth: 8 October 1983 (age 43)
- Place of birth: Rio de Janeiro, Brazil
- Height: 1.87 m (6 ft 2 in)
- Position: Centre-back

Youth career
- Fluminense
- Flamengo
- Guarani
- Corinthians

Senior career*
Years	Team	Apps	(Gls)
2005–2006	Primavera		
2006	Anapolina		
2007	Anápolis		
2007–2009	Ajax Cape Town	62	(7)
2009–2012	Mamelodi Sundowns	19	(1)
2012	América Cali	26	(0)
2013	Ratchaburi	11	
2013	CRB	18	(0)
2014	Mpumalanga Black Aces	14	(0)
2014–2015	Macaé	21	(1)
2015–2016	Esteghlal Khuzestan	11	(0)
2016	Pune City	11	(1)
2016−2017	Mohun Bagan	15	(0)
2017−2018	East Bengal	17	(2)
2018–2019	NEROCA	16	(2)

International career
2013	Equatorial Guinea	3	(0)
- * Club domestic league appearances and goals as of 22:55, 29 March 2019 (UTC)

Eduardo Soares Ferreira (born October 8, 1983) is a professional footballer who plays as a centre-back. Born in Brazil, he played for the Equatorial Guinea national team.

== Club career ==
After a stint with South African club Mamelodi Sundowns, Ferreira signed for Colombian second-tier club America Cali in January 2012. He injured himself in a match against Atlético Bucaramanga in May. In July 2013, he returned to the South African top tier with newly promoted club Black Aces after a stint with Thai club Ratchaburi.

In 2015, Ferreira signed for Iranian club Esteghlal Khuzestan from Brazilian club Macaé. In the only season he spent with the club, he won the Iran Professional League title with it. At the end of the season, he was told by the club that he was surplus to its requirements and he was free to leave the club in the summer. Subsequently, he moved to the Indian Super League and signed for Pune City for the 2016 season. In November, he scored his first goal for the club in a match against Atlético Kolkata.

On 6 December 2016, after the end of the Super League, Ferreira joined I-League club Mohun Bagan. In the following October, he switched to city rivals East Bengal as a replacement for the injured Carlyle Mitchell. He scored his first goal on 28 November, in a 2–2 draw against Aizawl FC.

In August 2018 he joined NEROCA FC.

== International career ==
Ferreira was naturalized in 2013 and made his international debut for Equatorial Guinea on 16 November 2013 against Spain as an 81st-minute substitute for Viera Ellong.
