= Victor Kamhuka =

Zimbabwean footballer (born 1990)

Personal information
- Date of birth: 2 April 1990 (age 36)
- Place of birth: Harare, Zimbabwe
- Height: 6 ft 4 in (1.93 m)
- Position: Defender

Team information
- Current team: Prime Bangkok
- Number: 42

Senior career*
| Years | Team | Apps | (Gls) |
| 2010 | Eagles | | |
| 2011–2021 | Black Aces | | |
| 2012–2013 | Black Leopards | 25 | (0) |
| 2013–2014 | Dynamos | 44 | (2) |
| 2015–2016 | How Mine | | |
| 2017–2018 | Pathachakra | 20 | (3) |
| 2018–2019 | MMC | 5 | (0) |
| 2019 | Bhawanipore | 10 | (0) |
| 2020 | Ayeyawady United | 25 | (1) |
| 2021 | PDRM FC | 20 | (0) |
| 2021 | Southern Samity | 10 | (0) |
| 2022 | Đông Á Thanh Hóa | 10 | (0) |
| 2023 | Pretoria Callies | 14 | (0) |
| 2024 | Samtse FC | 12 | (2) |
| 2025 | Delhi FC | 7 | (1) |
| 2025– | Prime Bangkok | 8 | (0) |

International career
| 2006 | Zimbabwe U-17 | 10 | (0) |
| 2008–2009 | Zimbabwe U-20 | 12 | (0) |
| 2011–2012 | Zimbabwe U-23 | 18 | (0) |
| 2021– | Zimbabwe | 1 | (0) |
- * Club domestic league appearances and goals

Victor Kamhuka (born 2 April 1990) is a Zimbabwean professional footballer who plays as a defender.

== Club career ==
=== Dynamos Harare ===
On 1 July 2013, Victor Kamkuka was signed by Dynamos Harare Zimbabwe, a first-division club in Zimbabwe as a defender and spent there 2013–17 and joined Premier Soccer League.

=== Pathachakra ===
In August 2017, Victor Kamhuka joined Calcutta Football League side Pathachakra. He played all the 9 League matches and scored one goal.

In August 2018, he returned to Pathachakra for 2018–19 CFL Season. He played all the 11 league matches for the club and scored two goals.

=== Manang Marshyangdi Club ===
In December 2018, Kamhuka joined Nepali club Manang Marshyangdi as their fourth foreign signing.

=== Southern Samity ===
In 2021, he moved to Calcutta Football League side Southern Samity.

=== Đông Á Thanh Hóa ===
In February 2022, Kamhuka joined Đông Á Thanh Hóa in V.League 1 for first haft of season. He played 10 games and 5 of them were clean-sheet games.

=== Pretoria Callies ===
In February 2023, Kamhuka joined Pretoria Callies in National First Division for a season. He played 14 games.

=== Sampse ===
In May 2024, Kamhuka joined Samtse FC in Bhutan Premier League for 3 months. He played 12 games and had 2 goals.

=== Delhi ===
In Jan 2025, Kamhuka joined Delhi FC in I-League. On 3 February, he scored his first goal for the club in 2-1 winning game - Delhi FC’s 72-days wait for a three-pointer ends in Mahilpur.

=== Prime Bangkok ===
In July 2025, Kamhuka joined Prime Bangkok in Thai League 3 for a season.

== International career ==
He made his debut for Zimbabwe national football team on 29 March 2021 in a 2021 Africa Cup of Nations qualifier against Zambia.
