= Charles (footballer, born 1993) =

Brazilian footballer

Personal information
- Full name: Charles do Vale de Souza
- Date of birth: 2 July 1994 (age 32)
- Place of birth: Franca, Brazil
- Height: 1.78 m (5 ft 10 in)
- Position: Forward

Team information
- Current team: Alondras
- Number: 9

Youth career
- 2008−2012: Olé Brasil
- 2012: Fluminense

Senior career*
| Years | Team | Apps | (Gls) |
| 2013−2014 | Comercial | | |
| 2014−2016 | Monte Azul | | |
| 2014−2015 | → Caxias do Sul (loan) | | |
| 2015−2016 | → Vejle BK (loan) | 9 | (0) |
| 2016−2017 | Alvarenga | 12 | (2) |
| 2016–2017 | → Chennai City (loan) | 18 | (4) |
| 2017 | East Bengal | 7 | (1) |
| 2018–2019 | Xuventú Sanxenxo | 15 | (1) |
| 2019 | Alondras | 15 | (1) |
| 2020– | Ribadumia | 31+ | (5+) |
- * Club domestic league appearances and goals as of 22:27, 26 January 2020 (UTC)

Charles do Vale de Souza (born 2 July 1994) is a Brazilian professional footballer who plays as a forward for Spanish club Ribadumia.

== Career ==
Born in São Paulo, Charles began his career with Campeonato Gaúcho side Caxias before moving to Denmark to play for Danish 1st Division side Vejle.

On 28 December 2016, Charles signed with Chennai City of India's I-League on loan from Portuguese side GDSC Alvarenga. He made his debut for the side on 8 January 2017 against Minerva Punjab. He started and played 82 minutes as Chennai City drew 0–0.He scored first goal against Aizawl FC From a penalty in the 89th minute He scored a total of four league goals and at the end of the season, he was awarded the club's player of the season award.

On 24 August 2017, Charles signed for East Bengal of the same league.

== Career statistics ==
As of 11 May 2017

| Club | Season | League | | | League Cup | | Domestic Cup | | Continental | | Total | |
| Club | Season | Division | Apps | Goals | Apps | Goals | Apps | Goals | Apps | Goals | Apps | Goals |
|---|---|---|---|---|---|---|---|---|---|---|---|---|
| Chennai City | 2016–17 | I-League | 18 | 4 | — | — | | | — | — | 18 | 4 |
| Career total | | | 18 | 4 | 0 | 0 | 0 | 0 | 0 | 0 | 18 | 4 |
