= Mahmoud Amnah =

Syrian footballer (born 1983)

Personal information
- Full name: Mahmoud Amnah
- Date of birth: 3 January 1983 (age 43)
- Place of birth: Aleppo, Syria
- Height: 1.77 m (5 ft 10 in)
- Position: Midfielder

Senior career*
Years	Team	Apps	(Gls)
2001–2003	Al-Hurriya	41	(10)
2003–2007	Al-Ittihad SC Aleppo	120	(30)
2009–2012	Rah Ahan	68	(6)
2012–2013	Sulaymaniyah	30	(5)
2013–2014	Sime Darby	24	(6)
2015–2016	Sporting Clube de Goa	28	(5)
2016–2017	Aizawl	20	(3)
2017–2018	East Bengal	40	(9)
2019	Minerva Punjab	11	(1)
2019–2020	Southern Samity	11	(2)

International career
2002–2011	Syria	80	(20)
- * Club domestic league appearances and goals as of 16:28, 24 February 2018 (UTC)

Mahmoud Amnah (Arabic: مَحْمُود آمِنَة; born 3 January 1983 in Aleppo) is a Syrian footballer who plays as a midfielder. He has earned 80 caps for the Syria national team between 2002 and 2011, scoring 20 goals. He last played for Calcutta Football League side Southern Samity.

He represented Minerva Punjab of India at the 2019 AFC Cup, scored a goal against Abahani Limited Dhaka of Bangladesh at the Bangabandhu National Stadium in Dhaka.

== International career ==
Amnah had been a regular for the Syria national football team from 2002 to 2011. He made 10 appearances for Syria during the qualifying rounds of the 2006 and the 2010 FIFA World Cup.

== Club career ==
- Played for the first team in the club horaya in 2001
- And in 2002 achieved a fourth place with Club el horaya
- And in 2003 he moved for the ittihad club in the most expensive deal in the history of the Syrian ball at this time Ittihad club is most famous club in Syria
- And in 2004 achieved a league and cup double with Syria's Al Ittihad.
- And in 2005 achieve the Cup of the Republic of Syria.
- And third place in 2006 and participated in the Asian Championship with the club.
- 2007 and the cup and Syrian participation in the Asian Club Championship.
- 2008 shared in Asian champion league
- in 2009 to 2012 played in Iranian super league with Rah Ahn team in Tehran
- 2012-2013 played with Iraqi super league in sulimanaya team in Kurdistan of Iraq

2013-2014 went to play in Malaysian super league With sime darby fc Achieve the fifth place in the league

- Number of games in the Syrian league 250 games
- Number of games in the Iranian league 80 games
- Number of games in Iraqi league 33 games
- Number of games in Malaysian league 24 games.

He played a pivotal role for East Bengal for their 8th consecutive CFL triumph. He was the best player of that season for the red and gold brigade.

== Career statistics ==
=== Club career statistics ===
Club performance			League		Cup		Continental		Total	
Season	Club	League	Apps	Goals	Apps	Goals	Apps	Goals	Apps	Goals
Iran			League		Hazfi Cup		Asia		Total	
2009-10	Rah Ahan	Persian Gulf Cup	22	2	1	0	-	-	23	2
2010-11	Rah Ahan	Persian Gulf Cup	29	1	1	0	-	-	30	1
2011-12	Rah Ahan	Persian Gulf Cup	17	0	1	0	-	-	17	0
Total	Iran		68	3	3	0	-	-	71	3
Career total			68	3	3	0	-	-	71	3

- Assist Goals

Season	Team	Assists
09–10	Rah Ahan	1
10–11	Rah Ahan	1
11–12	Rah Ahan	1

=== Goals for senior national team ===
Scores and results table. Syria's goal tally first:

#	Date	Venue	Opponent	Score	Result	Competition
1.	8 Oct 2004	Doha, Qatar	Qatar	1–0	2–1	International Friendly
2.	26 Jan 2005	Kuwait City, Kuwait	Kuwait	1–1	2–3	International Friendly
3.	4 Dec 2005	Al-Gharafa Stadium, Doha, Qatar	Bahrain	1–0	2–2	West Asian Games 2005
4.	10 Dec 2005	Qatar SC Stadium, Doha, Qatar	Iraq	1–0	2–2	West Asian Games 2005
5.	17 May 2008	Abbasiyyin Stadium, Damascus, Syria	Iraq	1–0	2–1	International Friendly

== Honours ==
Al-Ittihad

- Syrian Premier League: 2005
- Syrian Cup: 2005, 2006

Aizawl

- I-League: 2016–17

East Bengal

- Calcutta Football League: 2017

Syria

- WAFF Championship runner-up: 2004
- West Asian Games runner-up: 2005
- Nehru Cup runner-up: 2007

Individual

- East Bengal "Player of the Season Award": 2017
