= Willis Plaza =

Trinidad and Tobago footballer

Personal information
- Full name: Willis Deon Plaza
- Date of birth: 3 August 1987 (age 39)
- Place of birth: Mount Hope, Trinidad and Tobago
- Position: Forward

Senior career*
Years	Team	Apps	(Gls)
2010–2012	San Juan Jabloteh		
2012	Navibank Sài Gòn	12	(5)
2012–2013	Sông Lam Nghệ An	18	(4)
2014	Central FC		
2014–2015	Visé	6	(3)
2015–2016	Central FC		
2016	Alianza		
2016	San Juan Jabloteh		
2017–2018	East Bengal	24	(11)
2018	Mohammedan		
2018–2020	Churchill Brothers	35	(29)
2020	→ Bashundhara Kings (loan)		
2020–2021	Mohammedan		
2021	Delhi		
2021–2022	Aizawl	11	(2)
2022–2023	Bhawanipore		

International career
2012–	Trinidad and Tobago	23	(7)
- * Club domestic league appearances and goals

Willis Deon Plaza (born 3 August 1987) is a Trinidadian professional footballer who plays as a forward.

== Club career ==
=== Early years ===
In his early career, Plaza played club football in Trinidad and Vietnam for San Juan Jabloteh, Navibank Sài Gòn and Sông Lam Nghệ An, Central FC. In July 2014 he signed for Belgian club Visé.

In December 2015, Plaza signed a deal to join Salvadoran Primera División side Alianza in January 2016. In 2016, he returned to San Juan Jabloteh.

=== East Bengal ===
In January 2017, Plaza signed for Indian I-League club East Bengal. On 14 January, he scored his first goal for the club, scoring the winning goal in the 80th minute of a 2–1 victory against DSK Shivajians.

On 4 July 2017, it was announced that the club had retained Plaza for the upcoming season. In January 2018, he was released by the club.

=== Mohammedan/Churchill Brothers ===
It was announced that Willis would sign for Mohammedan from 8 February 2018. He then moved to Churchill Brothers in March 2018. He won the golden boot of the 2018–19 I-League season, with 21 goals.

He scored a brace for Churchill in their Indian Super Cup qualifier against Delhi Dynamos and helped his side to advance in to the final round of the tournament. Later he was included in Churchill's squad for remaining matches of the Goa Professional League.

He was retained by Churchill Brothers for the 2019 season. In April 2019 he moved on loan to Bashundhara Kings.

In July 2020, he returned to Mohammedan.

=== Delhi FC ===
In August 2021, he signed with Minerva Delhi FC and appeared in the 130th edition of Durand Cup. Plaza later appeared in the 2021 I-League Qualifiers, in which they finished on third position.

=== Aizawl ===
On 25 November 2021, Plaza moved to Aizawl FC, ahead of the 2021–22 I-League season.

=== Bhawanipore ===
He signed for Bhawanipore in June 2022. He helped his team winning Naihati Gold Cup with scoring a brace in their 4–0 win against United Sports.

== International career ==
He made his international debut for Trinidad and Tobago on 22 January 2012.

== Personal life ==
Plaza has said that his ancestors lived in the southern part of the Indian city of Kolkata. During his school days, Plaza played cricket and was a friend of West Indian international Sunil Narine. In an interview, he said that Narine was his close friend and both of them idolised Brian Lara. He also said that he started playing football on the advice of his coach.

== Career statistics ==
=== International ===
Trinidad and Tobago national team
Year	Apps	Goals
2012	6	4
2013	3	1
2014	2	0
2015	7	0
2016	3	2
Total	21	7

Statistics accurate as of match played 3 June 2016

=== International goals ===
As of match played 3 June 2016. Trinidad & Tobago score listed first, score column indicates score after each Plaza goal.

International goals by date, venue, cap, opponent, score, result and competition
No.	Date	Venue	Cap	Opponent	Score	Result	Competition
1	29 February 2012	Sir Vivian Richards Stadium, Antigua, Antigua and Barbuda	2	Antigua and Barbuda	4–0	4–0	Friendly
2	10 October 2012	Warner Park Sporting Complex, Basseterre, Saint Kitts and Nevis	3	French Guiana	4–1	4–1	2012 Caribbean Cup
3	14 October 2012	Warner Park Sporting Complex, Basseterre, Saint Kitts and Nevis	5	Anguilla	8–0	10–0	2012 Caribbean Cup
4	14 October 2012	Warner Park Sporting Complex, Basseterre, Saint Kitts and Nevis	5	Anguilla	9–0	10–0	2012 Caribbean Cup
5	5 September 2013	King Fahd International Stadium, Riyadh, Saudi Arabia	8	United Arab Emirates	1–3	3–3	Friendly
6	3 June 2016	Qinhuangdao Olympic Sports Center Stadium, Qinhuangdao, China	23	China	1–3	2–4	Friendly
7	3 June 2016	Qinhuangdao Olympic Sports Center Stadium, Qinhuangdao, China	23	China	2–3	2–4	Friendly

== Honours ==
Bhawanipore

- Naihati Gold Cup: 2022
- CFL Premier Division A runner-up: 2022

Individual

- I-League Golden Boot: 2018–19 (with 21 goals)
