= Southern Samity =

Indian association football club

- Full name: Southern Samity Football Club
- Founded: 1945; 81 years ago
- Ground: Rabindra Sarobar Stadium
- Capacity: 22,000
- President: Asraf Ali Shaikh
- Head coach: Sujata Kar
- League: Calcutta Football League
| Home colours | Away colours |

Southern Samity (Bengali: সাদার্ন সমিতি) is an Indian professional multi-sports club from Kolkata. Founded in 1945, the club was initially based in Siliguri. Its football section competes in the Calcutta Football League, and previously participated in the I-League 2nd Division, then second tier of Indian football league system.

== History ==
=== Formation and journey ===
Southern Samity was founded in the city of Kolkata in 1945, during the British rule in India. During that time they were involved in various sporting and cultural activities. In 1959, the club got their affiliation from the Indian Football Association (IFA), but the club got their footsteps in Indian football long after their foundation. From 2007 to 2008 onwards, Frontlink International took charge of the club's football department, which boosted the growth highly.

=== Present years ===
In the year of 2008–09, they emerged as the champions of Calcutta Premier Division B and were promoted to the Calcutta Premier Division A. In 2011, Southern Samity created history as they became the first club after Behala Youth in 1975 to reach the prestigious IFA Shield semi-final on debut. In 2011–12 CFL season, the club was managed by Shabbir Ali. They also reached to the quarter-final of the 2012 IFA Shield. Southern Samity participated in the 2013 I-League 2nd Division and moved to the final round, where they achieved sixth position. In 2015, they played in the Calcutta Premier Division Group A.

In 2016, Southern Samity appointed Amit Sen as their new head coach and participated in the 2016–17 I-League 2nd Division, where they achieved success and qualified for the final round. They finished the season as runners-up with 17 points from 10 matches, behind champions NEROCA FC.

In 2020, Southern Samity reached the quarter-finals of the IFA Shield before losing 0–1 to I-League side Real Kashmir. Besides football, the club along with state football governing body IFA, and Kalighat MS have joined the fight against COVID-19 pandemic in West Bengal from May 2021 by providing free vaccinations to people.

On 1 July 2021, Southern Samity appointed Biswajit Bhattacharya as their new head coach. The club then roped in Ugandan trio Hamdan Nsubuga, Peter Mutebi and Habib Kavuma. They began their 2021–22 Calcutta Premier Division campaign with a 3–0 defeat against Mohammedan Sporting. On 23 August, Southern Samity was deducted six points by IFA and also handed two losses which includes their forfeited match against United Sports, and were relegated to the Premier Division B. In June 2023, the Indian Football Association (IFA) announced the merger of both Premier Division A and B of the Calcutta Football League, ahead of its 125th edition, in which Southern Samity was placed within Group-I.

== Stadium ==
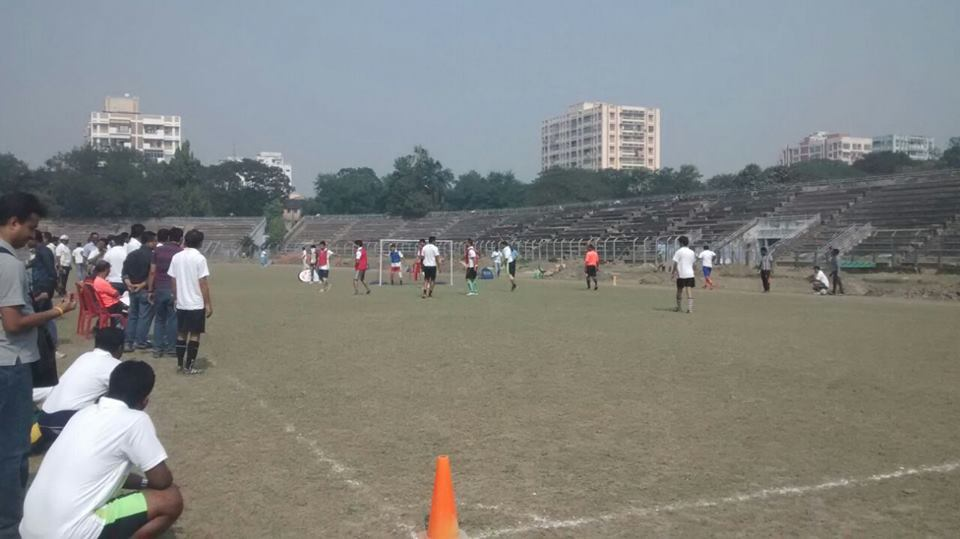
Rabindra Sarobar Stadium before renovation

Southern Samity used Rabindra Sarobar Stadium in Lake Gardens, Kolkata, as their home ground for matches of both the I-League 2nd Division and Calcutta Football League. Opened in 1961, the stadium is also known as Lake Stadium and has a capacity of 22,000 spectators.

== Team management ==
| Position | Name |
|---|---|
| Chairperson | (India) Jinia Roy Chowdhury |
| President | (India) Asraf Ali Shaikh |
| Senior vice president | (India) Pranab Mukhapadhyay |
| Vice presidents | (India) Tirthankar Bagchi, (India) Sanjay Bose (India) Lalit Sharma |
| Head coach | (India) Sujata Kar |
| Team manager | (India) Amit Sen |
| General secretary | (India) Sourav Pal |

== Notable players ==
Past and present internationals

The foreign players below had youth/senior international cap(s) for their respective countries. Players whose name is listed, represented their countries before or after playing for Southern Samity.

- (Nigeria) Echezona Anyichie (2011–2012)
- (Namibia) Alfred Ndyenge (2011–2012)
- (Australia) Matthew Mayora (2012)
- (Saint Lucia) Sherwin Emmanuel (2012–2013)
- (Liberia) Teah Dennis Jr. (2017–2018)
- (Zimbabwe) Victor Kamhuka (2017, 2021–)
- (Syria) Mahmoud Al Amnah (2019–2020)
- (Uganda) Habib Kavuma (2022–)

Noted Indian player(s)

- (India) Deepak Mondal (2017) – recipient of both the Arjuna Award and AIFF Player of the Year.

== Honours ==
=== League ===
- I-League 2nd Division
  - Runners-up (1): 2016–17
- Calcutta Premier Division B
  - Champions (1): 2009
  - Runners-up (1): 2018–19
- CFL Second Division
  - Champions (1): 2007–08

=== Cup ===
- Kalinga Cup
  - Champions (1): 2013
- Jananayak Karpuri Thakur Cup
  - Champions (1): 2014
- Naihati Gold Cup
  - Champions (1): 2021
- Domjur Gold Cup
  - Champions (1): 2010
- Netaji–Subhash Trophy
  - Champions (1): 2010
- Darjeeling Gold Cup
  - Runners-up (1): 2010
- ONGC Gold Cup
  - Runners-up (1): 2010–11

=== Women ===
- Calcutta Women's Football League
  - Runners-up (1): 2021–22

== Other departments ==
=== Southern Samity Women ===
The club has its women's football section, that competes in the Calcutta Women's Football League. In the 2021–22 league season, they achieved success with runner-up finish.

== See also ==
- List of football clubs in Kolkata
- Football in Kolkata
