= Ansumana Kromah =

Liberian footballer (born 1993)

Personal information
- Full name: Ghanefo Ansumana Agogo Kromah
- Date of birth: 24 December 1993 (age 32)
- Place of birth: Monrovia, Liberia
- Height: 1.75 m (5 ft 9 in)
- Position: Forward

Team information
- Current team: TRAU FC
- Number: 10

Senior career*
Years	Team	Apps	(Gls)
- Kiawu FC
- LISCR FC
- Zelor FC
- Barrack Young Controllers
2014–2015	Watanga FC		
2016–2017	Peerless	10	(11)
2016–2017	Churchill Brothers	13	(6)
2017–2018	Mohun Bagan	8	(2)
2018	East Bengal	7	(0)
2018	Peerless	10	(13)
2018–2019	Aizawl	17	(9)
2020	East Bengal	8	(1)
2020	Bhawanipore		
2021	Garhwal	9	(5)
2021–2022	Peerless	8	(6)
2022	Three Star Club	11	(6)
2022–2023	Tollygunge Agragami	6	(5)
2022–2023	Churchill Brothers		
2023	Bodoland		
2024	NEROCA	10	(6)
- * Club domestic league appearances and goals

Ghanefo Ansumana Agogo Kromah (born 24 December 1993), known simply as Ansumana Kromah, is a Liberian professional footballer who plays as a forward.

== Career ==
Kromah made his professional debut in India, playing for Peerless SC in Calcutta Football League. He then made his top-tier league appearance for Churchill Brothers in the I-League against Minerva Punjab. He came on as a substitute in the 72nd minute. He rejoined Quess East Bengal on 22 January 2020.

Later, he joined Bhawanipore FC and represented the club at the 2019–20 I-League 2nd Division.

On 5 January 2022, he moved to Nepali Martyr's Memorial A-Division League side Three Star Club.

== Personal life ==
Kromah hails from a very poor family consisting of seven brothers and one sister. Earning money by playing football has helped him to take care of his family.

Kromah is married to an Indian Bengali girl named Puja Dutta whom he had met through Facebook. He considers her as his lucky charm as he got an offer to play for Mohun Bagan 10 days after meeting her.

In July 2024, Kromah suffered a brain stroke in Kolkata.

== Career statistics ==
As of 24 March 2024

Appearances and goals by club, season and competition
Club	Season	League			National cup (Note: Includes Federation Cup, Super Cup)		Continental		Total	
Club	Season	Division	Apps	Goals	Apps	Goals	Apps	Goals	Apps	Goals
Churchill Brothers	2016–17	I-League	13	6	3	2	—	—	16	8
Mohun Bagan	2017–18	I-League	8	2	0	0	—	—	8	2
East Bengal	2019–20	I-League	7	0	0	0	—	—	7	0
Aizawl	2018–19	I-League	16	9	0	0	—	—	16	9
East Bengal	2019–20	I-League	8	1	0	0	—	—	8	1
Churchill Brothers	2022–23	I-League	0	0	4	5	—	—	4	5
Bodoland	2023-24	Durand Cup	0	0	3	0	—	—	3	0
NEROCA	2023–24	I-League	10	6	0	0	—	—	10	6
TRAU FC	2025-26	Durand Cup	0	0	3	0	—	—	3	0
Career total			65	24	13	7	0	0	75	31
