= Rainbow AC =

Indian association football club based in Kolkata

- Full name: New Barrackpore Rainbow Athletic Club
- Short name: NBPRAC
- Founded: 1956; 70 years ago
- Ground: Amal Dutta Stadium, Dumdum
- Capacity: 15,000
- Owner: Aditya Group
- Head coach: Aditya Chatterjee
- League: CFL Premier Division
- Website: Official website
Home colours	Away colours

NBP Rainbow Athletic Club (Bengali: রেইনবো অ্যাথলেটিক ক্লাব) is an Indian professional football club based in Kolkata, West Bengal, that competes in the Calcutta Premier Division.

The club was formerly known as Rainbow Athletic Club or simply Rainbow, and as NBP Rainbow Athletic Club due to sponsorship ties. In 2018, Rainbow AC participated in the I-League 2nd Division, the second tier of the Indian football league system. In 2020, the club was acquired by the Indian conglomerate Aditya Group, and officially renamed as Aditya School of Sports Rainbow Athletic Club, abbreviated as ASOS Rainbow AC.

== History ==
The team was founded in 1956 as Baranagore Rainbow Club by football enthusiast Pradip Roy and his associates. It was later renamed NBP Rainbow AC. The club has a rivalry with East Bengal Club, Mohun Bagan, Mohammedan Sporting, and Peerless SC.

Rainbow participates in the Calcutta Football League Premier Division.

In the 2019–20 season, the team was managed by Jahar Das. In 2020, the club entered into a partnership with Indian conglomerate Aditya Group. It was announced that the new entity would have former India international Debjit Ghosh as its technical director.

In June 2023, the IFA announced the merger of both Premier Division A and B of the Calcutta Football League ahead of its 125th edition, in which Rainbow was placed in Group B.

== Logo history ==
ASOS Rainbow AC first logo

== Kit manufacturers and shirt sponsors ==
Period	Kit manufacturer	Shirt sponsor
2018—2022	Nike	New Barrackpore Co-operative Homes Ltd
2022	Vamos	KREAMZ

== Players ==
Note: Flags indicate national team as defined under FIFA eligibility rules; some limited exceptions apply. Players may hold more than one non-FIFA nationality.

No.	Pos.	Nation	Player
1	GK	IND	Hemanta Ghosh
22	GK	IND	Shilton Paul
—	GK	IND	Satyabrata Manna
—	GK	IND	Pranup Limboo
—	GK	IND	Frevino Fernandes
—	DF	IND	Sourav Dasgupta (Captain)
—	DF	IND	Ramdinmawia Hnamte
—	DF	IND	Md Alamgir Hussain
—	DF	IND	Sagar Raihan Raza
—	DF	IND	Sujit Sadhu
—	DF	IND	Pramode Pradhan
—	DF	IND	Bijoy Das
—	DF	IND	Shambhu Bera
—	DF	IND	Urjay Bramha
15	DF	IND	Tanchok Hang Subba
16	DF	IND	Asish Chettri
—	DF	IND	Tania Raji
—	DF	IND	Enjamul Hoque

No.	Pos.	Nation	Player
—	MF	IND	Debayan Saha
6	MF	IND	SK Asif Ahmed
—	MF	IND	Jagannath Sana (8)
19	MF	IND	Pankaj Moullah
—	MF	IND	Shubhankar Sana
—	FW	IND	Suraj Mahato
11	FW	IND	Joydeep Gogoi
—	FW	IND	Anil Kisku
—	FW	IND	Farsad Abdusamad N
—	FW	IND	Arkabikash Tudu
—	FW	IND	Pritam Sarkar
—	MF	IND	Saptak Sherpa
—	MF	IND	Firoj Ali
—	FW	IND	Cho Tshering Lepcha
—	FW	IND	Rajesh Das
—	FW	IND	Denzil Ivan Mascarenhas
—	FW	IND	Raunak Paul

== Records ==
Season	Div.	Tms.	Pos.	Attendance/G	Federation Cup/Super Cup	Calcutta Football League
2018–19	I-League 2	16	4th, group C	–	DNP	5th

Key

- Tms. = Number of teams
- Pos. = Position in league
- Attendance/G = Average league attendance

== Honours ==
- CFL Premier Division B
  - Runners-up (2): 2016, 2022

== See also ==
- Football in Kolkata
- List of football clubs in Kolkata
