= Bhawanipore Club =

Association football club in Kolkata, India

Bhawanipore ভবানীপুর
- Full name: Bhawanipore Club
- Nickname: The Yellow Army
- Short name: BFC
- Founded: 1910; 116 years ago
- Ground: Salt Lake Stadium; Rabindra Sarobar Stadium
- Capacity: 85,000; 22,000
- Owner: Sangbad Pratidin
- Head coach: Saheed Sunkanmi Ramon
- League: CFL Premier Division
Home colours	Away colours

Bhawanipore Club, also known as সংবাদ প্রতিদিন ভবানীপুর ক্লাব for sponsorship reasons, is an Indian professional football club based in Bhowanipore, Kolkata, West Bengal. The club was established in 1910, and competed in the I-League 2nd Division, then second tier of the Indian football league system. Bhawanipore is currently competing in the CFL Premier Division.

== History ==
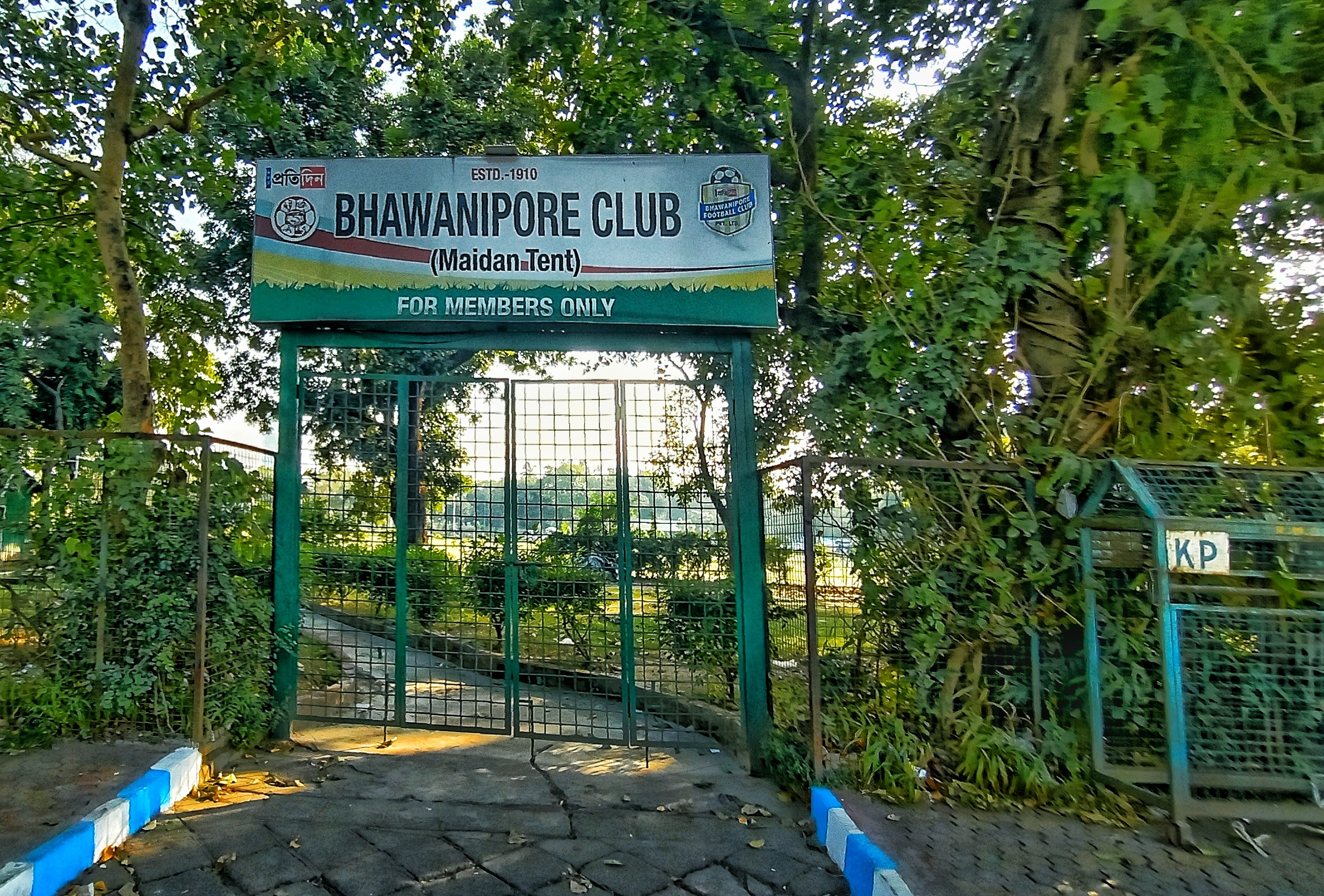
Main entrance of the Bhawanipore Football Club tent in Kolkata Maidan, West Bengal.

Bhawanipore Football Club was founded in 1910 by Nani Mitra in Bhowanipore, Kolkata. After the independence of India, Robi Das became the first ever footballer from Bhawanipore who represented India in men's tournament at the 1948 Summer Olympics in London. At that time Indo-Pak footballer Taj Mohammad Sr. appeared with the club. The club in 1948, reached the final of IFA Shield and finished as runner-up after a 2–1 defeat to Mohun Bagan. In January 2012, they were officially certified by the All India Football Federation to participate in the I-League 2nd Division, the second tier of football in India. After playing 6 games during the season Bhawanipore ended in 6th place out of 7 in Group C and thus failed to move to the Final half. They have also participated in domestic tournaments such as IFA Shield, and Durand Cup. In the 1960s, Bhawanipore have gone through rivalries with two of India's most successful clubs Mohun Bagan and East Bengal in CFL. Notable Bengali footballers Asim Moulick and Parimal Dey appeared with the club in 1971.

In 2013, Bhawanipore clinched the Bordoloi Trophy, defeating Aizawl 1–0. They achieved third place in the 2013 I-League 2nd Division. In next season, the club participated in 2014 I-League 2nd Division and moved to the final round of I-League qualifiers, and achieved second place with 17 points in 8 matches. In May 2018, they officially announced that legendary defender Subrata Bhattacharya was appointed as new head coach.

In the 2019–20 I-League 2nd Division, Bhawanipore participated and made it to the final round of I-League qualifiers. Sankarlal Chakraborty was appointed as head coach and they signed who foreign players; Liberian Ansumana Kromah and Ghanaian Philip Adjah. Due to the COVID-19 pandemic in India, usual final round format was scrapped off. It was decided that the final round of the league will be rescheduled into a new format and all the non-reserve teams from the preliminary stage will automatically progress to this round. It was officially named as I-League Qualifiers. The teams from the preliminary round were scheduled to play in a round-robin format in two venues, at the Salt Lake Stadium in Kolkata and Kalyani Stadium in Kalyani, near Kolkata to advance to the 2020–21 I-League. Bhawanipore finished on the second position of the league table at the end of I-League qualifiers, with 9 points in 4 matches. In 2022 Calcutta Premier Division, Bhawanipore as group champion, qualified to "super six" round and finished as runner-up, behind Mohammedan Sporting. In June 2023, the Indian Football Association made an announcement that the merger of both Premier Division A and B of the Calcutta Football League have done ahead of its 125th edition, in which Bhawanipore was allowed to compete in Group II. The club later qualified for CFL "Super Six" round. They gained I-League 3 spot in August 2023, to compete in the inaugural edition.

Bhawanipore finished 3rd in the Super Six stage of the 2024–25 CFL Premier Division and qualified for the 2025–26 I-League 3.

== Management and sponsorship ==
In 2012, Sangbad Pratidin became a premium sponsor of the club and they were also affiliated with Mohun Bagan AC. Sangbad Pratidin Bhawanipore Football Club Private Limited was incorporated on 22 December 2011.

== Kit manufacturers and shirt sponsors ==
Period	Kit manufacturer	Shirt sponsor
2012	Cosco	Sangbad Pratidin

== Rivalry ==
Bhawanipore has the rivalries with other two Calcutta Football League sides Kalighat Milan Sangha and Tollygunge Agragami FC, which is often referred to as the "South Kolkata Derby".

=== South Kolkata Derby ===
Opponent	Played	Wins	Draws	Losses
Bhawanipore	5	5	0	0
Tollygunge Agragami	6	0	6	0
Kalighat Milan Sangha	7	1	6	0
Total	18	1	16	1

== Season statistics ==
Season	Div.	Tms.	Pos.	Attendance/G	Federation Cup/Super Cup	AFC Champions League	AFC Cup
2012–13	IL2	23	G6th	-	DNP	DNP	DNP
2013–14	IL2	26	3	-	GStage	DNP	DNP
2014–15	IL2	11	2	-	DNP	DNP	DNP
2019–20	IL2	18	2	–	DNP	DNP	DNP
2023–24	IL3	25	G2nd	–	DNP	DNP	DNP

Key

- Tms. = Number of teams
- Pos. = Position in league
- Attendance/G = Average league attendance

== Coaching history ==
Name	Nationality	Years	Note
Robson Mattos de Oliviera	Brazil	2012	
Dulal Biswas	India	2012–2013	
Carlton Chapman	India	2013–2014	
Debjit Ghosh	India	2014–2015	
Subrata Bhattacharya	India	2017–2018	
Sankarlal Chakraborty	India	2019–2021	
Ranjan Chaudhuri	India	2023–2024	
Saheed Sunkanmi Ramon	India; Nigeria	2024–present	
Abhishek Goswami	india	2024-25	Futsal team

== Honours ==
=== Football ===
League

- I-League 2nd Division
  - Runners-up (2): 2014–15, 2019–20
  - Third place (1): 2012–13
- CFL Premier Division
  - Runners-up (4): 1952, 2016–17, 2017–18, 2022

Cup

- Cooch Behar Cup
  - Champions (3): 1923, 1927, 1929
- Ogilvie Cup
  - Winners (1): 1944
- Bordoloi Trophy
  - Winners (1): 2013
- IFA Shield
  - Runners-up (1): 1948
- Naihati Gold Cup
  - Winners (1): 2022
- Biju Patnaik Memorial Trophy
  - Winners (1): 2011

Youth

- LaLiga U-14 Youth Football Tournament
  - Champions (1): 2024
- IFA U-15 State Football League
  - Champions (1): 2025

=== Cricket ===
- CAB First Division Championship
  - Winners (4): 2018–19, 2019–20, 2021–22, 2023–24
- J. C. Mukherjee T-20 Championship
  - Winners (2): 2021, 2023, 2024 (joint-winners with Mohun Bagan)
- N. C. Chatterjee T-20 Championship
  - Winners (1): 2024 (joint-winners with Taltala Ekata Sangha)
- P. Sen Memorial Trophy
  - Runners-up (1): 2023
- CAB First Division One-Day Meet
  - Champions (1): 2024

=== Futsal ===
- AIFF Futsal Club Championship
  - Runners-up (1): 2024–25
- IFA Futsal Championship
  - Champions (1): 2024–25

== Notable players ==
=== Foreign internationals ===
The foreign players below had senior/youth international cap(s) for their respective countries. Players whose name is listed, represented their countries before or after playing for Bhawanipore FC.

- (Namibia) Richard Gariseb (2012–2014)
- (United States) (Afghanistan) Mohammad Mashriqi (2012–2014)
- (Nigeria) Orok Essien (2016–2017)
- (Zimbabwe) Victor Kamhuka (2019–2020)
- (Ghana) William Opoku (2020)
- (Ivory Coast) Arthur Kouassi K'gnan (2020)
- (Uganda) Henry Kisekka (2021–2022)
- (Nigeria) Echezona Anyichie (2021–2022)
- (Trinidad and Tobago) Willis Plaza (2022–2023)

=== Other notable player(s) ===
- (Brazil) José Ramirez Barreto (2012–2014) – NFL Golden Boot winner in 2000–01.

== Other departments ==
=== Youth football and academy ===
Bhawanipore FC operates several youth teams (U-13, U-15 and U-18) and academy. Under-19 team of the club previously took part in Youth I-League, competed in "Kolkata zone" in 2014. In April 2024, the club entered into a partnership with La Liga Academy for grassroots development in youth football. In July, club's academy team named Bhawanipore Pro India Academy, took part in LaLiga U-14 Youth Football Tournament held at the University of Putra, Malaysia, and became undefeated champions.

=== Men's cricket ===
Bhawanipore FC's men's cricket (named 'Bhawanipore Club') section is under the jurisdiction of the Cricket Association of Bengal (CAB), and competes in First Division League, J. C. Mukherjee T-20 Trophy and other regional tournaments. Club's cricket section is currently headquartered in 1, Nepal Bhattacharjee Street, Kolkata. Noted Indian international cricketers Rishi Dhawan, Jitesh Sharma, and other players like Chirag Jani have appeared with Bhawanipore in P. Sen Trophy. In 2023 edition of P. Sen Memorial Trophy, the club reached final, lost to Mohun Bagan at the end. Bhawanipore also participates in CAB T-20 Trophy.

In 2023–24 season, the club won treble, by winning CAB First Division Championship, J. C. Mukherjee T-20 Championship and the CAB One-day meet.

=== Men's hockey ===
Bhawanipore Club runs men's field hockey section. Noted India international Jaswant Singh Rajput appeared with the club in domestic leagues.

=== Tennis ===
Lawn tennis is a sport practiced at the Bhawanipore Club, and it is an affiliated member club of the Bengal Tennis Association (BTA).

=== Futsal ===
The club operates a futsal division, with its men's team competing in both the IFA Futsal Championship and AIFF Club Futsal Championship 2024-25 under head coach Abhishek Goswami who is AFC Futsal level 2 coach. In 2025, they secured the title by defeating United Kolkata Sports Club in the final, thereby earning qualification for the AIFF Futsal Club Championship 2024–25, scheduled to be held in August 2025 at the Manoj Sarkar Indoor Stadium, Rudrapur, Uttarakhand. Bhawanipore appointed Abhishek Goswami as their head coach. A qualified professional holding the AFC Futsal Level 2 License, his expertise and guidance were instrumental in leading Bhawanipore FC to victory in the prestigious IFA Futsal Championship 2024–25.

== Affiliated clubs ==
The following club is affiliated (reciprocal) with Bhawanipore FC:

- (India) Mohun Bagan AC

== See also ==
- Football in Kolkata
- List of football clubs in Kolkata
- Sangbad Pratidin
