= 2016–17 Aizawl FC season =

Indian football club season

Aizawl
2016–17 season
- Chairman: Robert Romawia Royte
- Manager: Khalid Jamil
- Stadium: Rajiv Gandhi Stadium
- I-League: 1st
- Federation Cup: Semi-finals
- Durand Cup: Semi-finals
- Mizoram Premier League: Semi-finals
- Top goalscorer: League: Kamo Stephane Bayi (7); All: Kamo Stephane Bayi (7)
- Highest home attendance: 11,000 vs Mohun Bagan (22 April 2017)
- Lowest home attendance: 4,725 vs Churchill Brothers (10 February 2017)
- Average home league attendance: 6,943
Home colours	Away colours

The 2016–17 season is the 33rd season in the history of Aizawl Football Club and their second in the I-League, India's top flight professional football league. The season began on 1 August 2016 and will conclude in May 2017. The club ended the I-League campaign as the champions after they were reinstated into the league after they were relegated the previous season. The club will also participate in the Federation Cup while they also made it to the semi-finals of the Mizoram Premier League and the Durand Cup.

Due to I-League regulations, despite finishing the season in 9th, over bottom placed DSK Shivajians, Aizawl were still relegated from the league in 2015–16. However, due to the withdrawal of the Goan clubs, Dempo, Salgaocar, and Sporting Goa, the club were reinstated into the league. The club brought in Khalid Jamil as the head coach who replaced caretaker Jahar Das. Jamil brought with him two of his former players from his previous club Mumbai in Ashutosh Mehta and Jayesh Rane. He also had the club sign goalkeeper Albino Gomes on loan from Mumbai City. In the foreigners department, the club retained Alfred Jaryan while also signing former Syria international Mahmoud Amnah as well as defender Kingsley Obumneme and forward Kamo Stephane Bayi.

The club started the season by participating in the Durand Cup and Mizoram Premier League, the top football league in their home state of Mizoram. Jamil, as well as the new player signings, were not with the club during these tournaments. The club made it to the semi-finals of the Durand Cup before being eliminated by Army Green. Aizawl then finished the regular season of the Mizoram Premier League in third place, qualifying for the league semi-finals. They took on Chanmari, losing both legs of the tie 4–1 and 2–1 respectively. Once Jamil and the new players arrived, the club prepared for the I-League season. Aizawl started the season strong, winning three of their opening five matches in January. The club then won four of their six matches in February and four of their last seven matches to win the title. The title was confirmed on the final game of the season against Shillong Lajong in a 1–1 draw.

== Background ==
Aizawl earned the promotion to 2015–16 I-League by winning 2015 I-League 2nd Division. In spite of spirited performances, Aizawl ended up at the bottom of table and were scheduled to be relegated. However, due to withdrawal of Goan clubs, Aizawl given another opportunity to play in I-League.

=== Squad changes ===
==== In ====
No.	Position	Player	Previous club	Date	Ref
4	DF	(India) Lalrinzuala Khiangte	(India) Zo United	24 June 2016	
37	DF	(India) Lalhriatrenga		24 June 2016	
	FW	(Ghana) Bright Middleton Mends	(Ghana) New Edubiase United	21 July 2016	
14	MF	(Nigeria) Benjamin Eniwo Onome		2 October 2016	
3	DF	(Nigeria) Kingsley Obumneme	(India) Dinthar	22 December 2016	
5	DF	(India) Zohmingliana Ralte	(India) DSK Shivajians	22 December 2016	
9	FW	(India) T. Lalnunpuia	(India) Rangdajied United	22 December 2016	
17	MF	(India) Laldanmawia Ralte	(India) Chanmari West	22 December 2016	
18	MF	(India) H. Lalmuankima	(India) Chanmari	22 December 2016	
32	FW	(Ivory Coast) Kamo Stephane Bayi	(India) George Telegraph	2 January 2017	
6	MF	(Syria) Mahmoud Amnah	(India) Sporting Clube de Goa	12 January 2017	

==== Out ====
No.	Position	Player	New club	Date	Ref
1	GK	(India) Soram Anganba	(India) NorthEast United	June 2016	
	DF	(India) Ricky Lallawmawma	(India) DSK Shivajians	June 2016	
	DF	(Nigeria) Emmanuel Chigozie		June 2016	
	DF	(India) Lalchhawnkima	(India) Mumbai FC	June 2016	
	MF	(Japan) Yuta Kinowaki	(India) Shillong Lajong	June 2016	
	MF	(India) David Lalrinmuana	(India) Mumbai City	June 2016	
	FW	(Nigeria) Joel Sunday	(India) Tollygunge Agragami	June 2016	
	MF	(Japan) Atsushi Yonezawa	(India) Minerva Punjab	June 2016	
	FW	(Ghana) Bright Middleton Mends		19 December 2016	
14	MF	(Nigeria) Benjamin Eniwo Onome		19 December 2016	

==== Loan in ====
No.	Position	Player	Club	Start date	Ref
23	MF	(India) V Laltanpuia	(India) Mizoram Police	December 2016	
1	GK	(India) Albino Gomes	(India) Mumbai City	2 January 2017	
14	MF	(India) Jayesh Rane	(India) Chennaiyin	2 January 2017	
36	DF	(India) Ashutosh Mehta	(India) Mumbai City	2 January 2017	

== Durand Cup ==
Aizawl were drawn in Group B with Indian Air Force, Dempo, Army Red, NEROCA, and Real Kashmir. With three wins, a draw and a loss, Aizawl topped the group and qualified for the semi-finals. However, they lost to eventual champions Army Green in penalty shoot-out, after the game ended 3–3 after the extra time.

Group B

Pos	Team	Pld	W	D	L	GF	GA	GD	Pts	Qualification
1	Aizawl	5	3	1	1	6	3	+3	10	Advance to Semi-finals
2	NEROCA	5	2	3	0	7	4	+3	9	Advance to Semi-finals
3	Dempo	5	2	1	2	13	6	+7	7	
4	Army Red	5	1	3	1	7	7	0	6	
5	Indian Air Force	5	0	3	2	4	6	−2	3	
6	Real Kashmir	5	0	3	2	12	6	+6	3	

Updated to match(es) played on 8 September 2016. Source:

29 August 2016	Aizawl	3–1	Dempo	Delhi
15:30	Mends 18', 30'; Vanlalduatsanga 61'		88'	Stadium: Harbaksh Stadium

2 September 2016	Aizawl	1–0	Indian Air Force	Delhi
14:00	Mends 35'			Stadium: Ambedkar Stadium

3 September 2016	Aizawl	0–1	NEROCA	Delhi
18:45			11' David Lalbiakzara	Stadium: Ambedkar Stadium

5 September 2016	Aizawl	1–0	Army Red	Delhi
17:45	Mends 52'			Stadium: Ambedkar Stadium

8 September 2016	Aizawl	1–1	Real Kashmir	Delhi
			William 6'	Stadium: Ambedkar Stadium

=== Semi-final ===
9 September 2016	Aizawl	3–3 (a.e.t.) (2–4 p)	Army Green	Delhi
19:00	Bright Mends 73', 97'; Lalramchullova 78' (pen.)		Bikash Budhathoki 23'; Bikram Adhikari 83'; Herojit Singh 91'	Stadium: Ambedkar Stadium

== Mizoram Premier League ==
After participating in the Durand Cup Aizawl returned to Mizoram to take part in the fifth season of the Mizoram Premier League, the top football league in the state. Aizawl opened their campaign on 15 September 2016 against Zo United at the AR Lammual Stadium. They took the lead early in the third minute through a penalty won by foreign import Bright Middleton and converted by Lalramchullova. Brandon Vanlalremdika doubled Aizawl's advantage right before halftime through a volley from outside the box and William Lalnunfela finished Zo United off in the 82nd minute as Aizawl won 3–0. Aizawl succumbed to their first defeat of the season in their second match against Chanmari. Former Aizawl player Malsawmfela scored the only goal of the match as Aizawl fell 1–0. Two days later, Aizawl suffered their second consecutive defeat when they lost 1–0 to Bethlehem VT. Lalrammuanpuia scored the only goal of the match for Bethlehem VT. Following the two defeats, Aizawl looked to turn things around against Chhinga Veng. Despite going down early in the fourth minute through Vanlallawma, late goals from Lalramchullova and Lalnuntluanga helped Aizawl comeback to win 2–1. The side then ended the month with a 0–0 draw against bottom placed Dinthar.

=== Matches ===
15 September 2016 3	Aizawl	3–0	Zo United	Mizoram
19:00 IST	Lalramchullova 3' (pen.); Vanlalremdika 45'; Lalnunfela 82'	Report		Stadium: AR Lammual Stadium

20 September 2016 1	Chanmari	1–0	Aizawl	Mizoram
19:00 IST	Malsawmfela 81'	Report		Stadium: AR Lammual Stadium

22 September 2016 4	Aizawl	0–1	Bethlehem VT	Mizoram
14:30 IST		Report	Lalrammuanpuia	Stadium: AR Lammual Stadium

26 September 2016 5	Chhinga Veng	1–2	Aizawl	Mizoram
19:00 IST	Vanlallawma 4'	Report	Lalramchullova 78'; Lalnuntluanga 90'	Stadium: AR Lammual Stadium

29 September 2016 6	Dinthar	0–0	Aizawl	Mizoram
19:00 IST		Report		Stadium: AR Lammual Stadium

3 October 2016 2	Aizawl	2–1	Ramhlun North	Mizoram
19:00 IST	Bright Mends 10', 76'		Chhuanpuia 43'	Stadium: AR Lammual Stadium

6 October 2016 7	Aizawl	0–1	Chanmari West	Mizoram
12:00 IST			Lalthakima 68' (o.g.)	Stadium: AR Lammual Stadium

25 October 2016 8	Aizawl	1–0	Chhinga Veng	Mizoram
19:00 IST	Riky Lallawmawma 45'			Stadium: AR Lammual Stadium

27 October 2016 9	Ramhlun North	1–0	Aizawl	Mizoram
19:00 IST	Francis 14'			Stadium: AR Lammual Stadium

4 November 2016 10	Chanmari West	0–1	Aizawl	Mizoram
19:00 IST			William 76'	Stadium: AR Lammual Stadium

11 November 2016 11	Zo United	1–2	Aizawl	Mizoram
15:00 IST	Lalnunsanga 53'		Bright Mends 10'; Rohmingthanga 37'	Stadium: AR Lammual Stadium

15 November 2016 12	Aizawl	2–2	Dinthar	Mizoram
15:00 IST	Lalthakima 18'; Lalramchullova 35'		Michael Lalremruata 1'; Cho Tsering Lepcha 87'	Stadium: AR Lammual Stadium

18 November 2016 13	Bethlehem VT	0–0	Aizawl	Mizoram
19:00 IST				Stadium: AR Lammual Stadium

25 November 2016 14	Aizawl	2–1	Chanmari	Mizoram
19:00 IST	Bright Mends 6'; F.Lalremsanga 45+1'		Malsawmfela 56' (pen.)	Stadium: AR Lammual Stadium

=== Table ===
Pos	Team	Pld	W	D	L	GF	GA	GD	Pts	Qualification or relegation
1	BVT	14	8	3	3	15	12	+3	27	Advance to Semi-finals
2	Chanmari	14	7	5	2	24	13	+11	26	Advance to Semi-finals
3	Aizawl	14	7	3	4	15	10	+5	24	Advance to Semi-finals
4	Chanmari West	14	6	3	5	20	15	+5	21	Advance to Semi-finals
5	Chhinga Veng	14	4	4	6	18	19	−1	16	

Updated to match(es) played on 26 November 2016. Source:
Rules for classification: 1) Points; 2) Goal difference; 3) Goals scored

=== Semi-finals ===
Leg 1

2 December 2016	Chanmari	4–1	Aizawl	Aizawl
19:00 IST	Chhangte 3'; Zote 11'; Rohmingthanga 22' (o.g.); Lalrinchhana 49'	Report	Hnamte 21'	Stadium: Lammual

Leg 2

9 December 2016	Aizawl	1–2 (2–6 agg.)	Chanmari	Aizawl
19:00 IST	Jonathan Lalhriatkima 50'	Report	Malsawmfela 41' (pen.); Leonce Dodoz 57'	Stadium: Lammual

== I-League ==
Before I-League, Aizawl hired former Indian international and Mumbai F.C. coach, Khalid Jamil.

=== January ===
Aizawl began their I-League campaign against the title-contenders East Bengal F.C. on 7 January 2017. Aizawl took the lead towards the end of the first half with Gurwinder Singh's own goal, however Ivan Bukenya's last minute strike salvaged a point for the hosts. In the first home game of the season, against I-League debutant Minerva Punjab F.C., Aizawl seemed to be heading for another draw until Loveday Enyinnaya's own goal in the stoppage time earned them a win.

==== Matches ====
7 January 2017 Round 1	East Bengal	1–1	Aizawl	Kolkata
16:30 IST	Ivan Bukenya 89'	Report; Report	Kamo 46' (yellow card) 90+'; Lalruatthara (yellow card) 73'	Stadium: Barasat Stadium; Attendance: 12700; Man of the Match: Kingsley Obumneme (Aizawl FC)

13 January 2017 Round 2	Aizawl	1–0	Minerva Punjab	Aizawl
13:30 IST	Kingsley (yellow card) 85'; Loveday 90+4' (o.g.)	Report; Report		Stadium: Rajiv Gandhi Stadium; Attendance: 5113; Man of the Match: Mahmoud Amnah (Aizawl FC)

17 January 2017 Round 3	Aizawl	2–1	Shillong Lajong	Aizawl
13:30 IST	Lalruatthara (yellow card) 20' (goal) 32'; Kingsley (yellow card) 54'; Rane 64'	Report; Report	Kinowaki 85'	Stadium: Rajiv Gandhi Stadium; Attendance: 5315; Man of the Match: Mahmoud Amnah (Aizawl FC)

22 January 2017 Round 4	Mumbai	0–1	Aizawl	Mumbai
19:05 IST		Report; Report	Rane (yellow card) 38'; Khiangte (yellow card) 52'; Ashutosh (yellow card) 57'; Amnah 80'	Stadium: Cooperage Ground; Attendance: 3426; Man of the Match: Jayesh Rane (Aizawl FC

28 January 2017 Round 5	Chennai City	2–0	Aizawl	Chennai
19:05 IST	Tank 53'; Carles 90+4'	Report; Report	Kingsley (yellow card) 90+5'; Lalruatthara (yellow card) 90+5'	Stadium: Jawaharlal Nehru Stadium; Attendance: 5434; Referee: Santhosh Kumar; Man of the Match: Marcos Thank (Chennai City)

1 February 2017 Round 6	Aizawl	1–0	DSK Shivajians	Aizawl
14:05 IST	Laldanmawia (yellow card) 8'; Z.Ralte (yellow card) 53'; Brandon 89'	Report; Report		Stadium: Rajiv Gandhi Stadium; Attendance: 7585; Referee: R Srikrishna; Man of the Match: Alfred Jaryan (Aizawl FC)

4 February 2017 Round 7	Mohun Bagan	3–2	Aizawl	Kolkata
19:05 IST	Duffy 2', 86'; Jeje 63'	Report; Report	Rane 41'; Lalruatthara (yellow card) 68'; Mehta 70'; Jaryan (yellow card) 83'	Stadium: Rabindra Sarobar Stadium; Attendance: 5222; Referee: Ajithkumar Meitei; Man of the Match: Prabir Das (Mohun Bagan)

10 February 2017 Round 8	Aizawl	3–1	Churchill Brothers	Aizawl
19:05 IST	Lalramchullova 62'; Kamo 69'; Nongkam 77' (o.g.)	Report; Report	Kromah 33'	Stadium: Rajiv Gandhi Stadium; Attendance: 4725; Referee: Om Prakash Thakur; Man of the Match: Kingsley Obumneme (Aizawl FC)

15 February 2017 Round 9	Aizawl	1–1	Bengaluru	Aizawl
14:05 IST	Mehta (yellow card) 23'; Brandon 40'; Lalruatthara (yellow card) 53'	Report; Report	Jhingan (yellow card) 21'; Chhetri 45'	Stadium: Rajiv Gandhi Stadium; Attendance: 6,750; Referee: Rowan Arumughan; Man of the Match: Albino Gomes (Aizawl)

20 February 2017 Round 10	Aizawl	1–0	East Bengal	Aizawl
14:05 IST	Lalramchullova (yellow card) 55'; Laldanmawia Ralte 58'	Report; Report		Stadium: Rajiv Gandhi Stadium; Attendance: 7000; Referee: Umesh Bora; Man of the Match: Laldanmawia Ralte (Aizawl FC)

25 February 2017 Round 11	Aizawl	1–0	Chennai City	Aizawl
14:05 IST	Brandon 53'; Amnah (yellow card) 67'; Jaryan (yellow card) 80'	Report; Report		Stadium: Rajiv Gandhi Stadium; Attendance: 7500; Referee: Pranjal Banerjee; Man of the Match: Brandon Vanlalremdika (Aizawl FC)

4 March 2017 Round 12	Aizawl	2–0	Mumbai	Aizawl
14:05 IST	Kamo 65', 78'	Report; Report		Stadium: Rajiv Gandhi Stadium; Attendance: 7500; Referee: Ajitkumar Meitei; Man of the Match: Kamo Stephane Bayi (Aizawl FC)

7 March 2017 Round 13	DSK Shivajians	0–1	Aizawl	Pune
19:05 IST		Report; Report	Laldanmawia 85'; Kingsley (yellow card) 90+3'	Stadium: Balewadi Stadium; Attendance: 1107; Referee: Senthilnathan S Man of the Match: Laldanmawia Ralte (Aizawl FC)

11 March 2017 Round 14	Minerva Punjab	2–2	Aizawl	Ludhiana
16:35 IST	Loveday 61'; Omolaja 83'	Report; Report	Amnah 45'; Mehta (yellow card) 51'; Kamo 56'; Albino (yellow card) 75'	Stadium: Guru Nanak Stadium; Attendance: 1500; Referee: Venkatesh R Man of the Match: Kareem Omolaja (Minerva Punjab)

9 April 2017 Round 15	Bengaluru FC	1–0	Aizawl	Bengaluru
16:35 IST	Juanan (yellow card) 42'; Jugovic (yellow card) 63' (goal) 90+4'; Rodrigues (yellow card) 76'	Report; Report	Z. Ralte (yellow card) 43'; Obumneme (yellow card) 87'; Jaryan (yellow card) 90+3'	Stadium: Sree Kanteerava Stadium; Attendance: 6,834; Referee: Venkatesh R Man of the Match: Jayesh Rane (Aizawl)

15 April 2017 Round 16	Churchill Brothers	1–3	Aizawl	Vasco
16:35 IST	D'Souza 69'	Report; Report	Kamo 7', 46'; Rane (yellow card) 55'; Laldanmawia 85'; Amnah (yellow card) 87'	Stadium: Tilak Maidan Stadium; Attendance: 1736; Referee: Ranjit Bakshi; Man of the Match: Kamo Stephane Bayi (Aizawl FC)

22 April 2017 Round 17	Aizawl	1–0	Mohun Bagan	Aizawl
14:05 IST	Jaryan (yellow card) 52'; Mehta 69'; Z.Ralte (yellow card) 83'	Report; Report		Stadium: Rajiv Gandhi Stadium; Attendance: 11000; Referee: Rahul Kumar Gupta; Man of the Match: Zohmingliana Ralte (Aizawl FC)

30 April 2017 Round 18	Shillong Lajong	1–1	Aizawl	Shillong
19:05 IST	Dipanda (yellow card) 9'	Report; Report	Z.Ralte (yellow card) 16'; Kingsley (yellow card) 24'; W.Lalnunfela (yellow card) 61' (goal) 68'	Stadium: Jawaharlal Nehru Stadium; Attendance: 23700; Referee: Pranjal Banerjee; Man of the Match: Kamo Stephane Bayi (Aizawl FC)

=== League table ===
Pos	Team	Pld	W	D	L	GF	GA	GD	Pts	Qualification or relegation
1	Aizawl (C)	18	11	4	3	24	14	+10	37	Qualification to Champions League qualifier
2	Mohun Bagan	18	10	6	2	27	12	+15	36	
3	East Bengal	18	10	3	5	33	15	+18	33	
4	Bengaluru	18	8	6	4	30	15	+15	30	Qualification to AFC Cup qualifying play-off (Note: Bengaluru qualified for the 2018 AFC Cup by winning the 2016–17 Federation Cup.)
5	Shillong Lajong	18	7	5	6	24	23	+1	26	

Source: IndiaFooty.com
Rules for classification: 1) points; 2) head-to-head points; 3) head-to-head goal difference; 4) goal difference; 5) number of goals scored; 6) drawing of lots
(C) Champions

== Federation Cup ==
=== Group stage ===
Aizawl were drawn with East Bengal, Chennai City and Churchill Brothers in Group A. Aizawl took on Chennai City in the opening game. Aizawl were trailing by 2 goals at the end of the first half, but came back strongly in the second half to score 3 goals and win the game. Aizawl took an early lead in the second game against Churchill Brothers, but in the closing minutes Churchill Brothers earned a penalty and converted. Aizawl fought back to score the winner in the 90th minute and secured a spot in the semi-finals. In the dead-rubber game against East Bengal neither team managed a goal and split a point each and Aizawl topped the group.

Group A

Pos	Team	Pld	W	D	L	GF	GA	GD	Pts	Qualification
1	Aizawl	3	2	1	0	5	3	+2	7	Advance to semi-finals
2	East Bengal	3	1	2	0	3	1	+2	5	Advance to semi-finals
3	Chennai City	3	1	0	2	5	6	−1	3	
4	Churchill Brothers	3	0	1	2	3	6	−3	1	

Source: AIFF

7 May 2017	Aizawl	3–2	Chennai City	Cuttack
19:00 IST	Kingsley (yellow card) 17'; Lalramchullova (yellow card) 36'; Amnah 53'; Laldanmawia 62', 81'; Albino Gomes (yellow card) 90+2'	Report	Charles 13'; Edwin 39'	Stadium: Barabati Stadium; Man of the Match: Laldanmawia Ralte (Aizawl FC)

9 May 2017	Churchill Brothers	1–2	Aizawl	Cuttack
19:00 IST	Kromah 84' (pen.)		Lalramchullova 21' (pen.); Laldanmawia 90'	Stadium: Barabati Stadium; Man of the Match: Lalruatthara (Aizawl FC)

11 May 2017	Aizawl	0–0	East Bengal	Cuttack
19:00 IST		Report		Stadium: Barabati Stadium; Man of the Match: Bikash Jairu (East Bengal)

=== Semi-finals ===
In the semi-final, Aizawl faced Group B runner-up, Bengaluru FC. Aizawl conceded the lead in the 8th minute when Alwyn George was fouled inside the box and Bengaluru were awarded the penalty and Cameron Watson successfully converted the penalty. Bengaluru had more scoring opportunities but could not extend their lead. Aizawl were given the penalty seconds before the final whistle, but Amrinder Singh saved Lalramchullova and ended Aizawl's Federation Cup campaign.

14 May 2017	Aizawl	0–1	Bengaluru	Cuttack
19:00 IST	Amnah (yellow card) 52'; Lalruatthara (yellow card) 59'	Report	Watson 8' (pen.)	Stadium: Barabati Stadium; Man of the Match: John Johnson (Bengaluru FC)

== Aftermath ==
End of the season awards by I-League, Khalid Jamil won the Syed Abdul Rahim Best Coach award and Alfred Jaryan won the Best Midfielder award.

== Technical staff ==
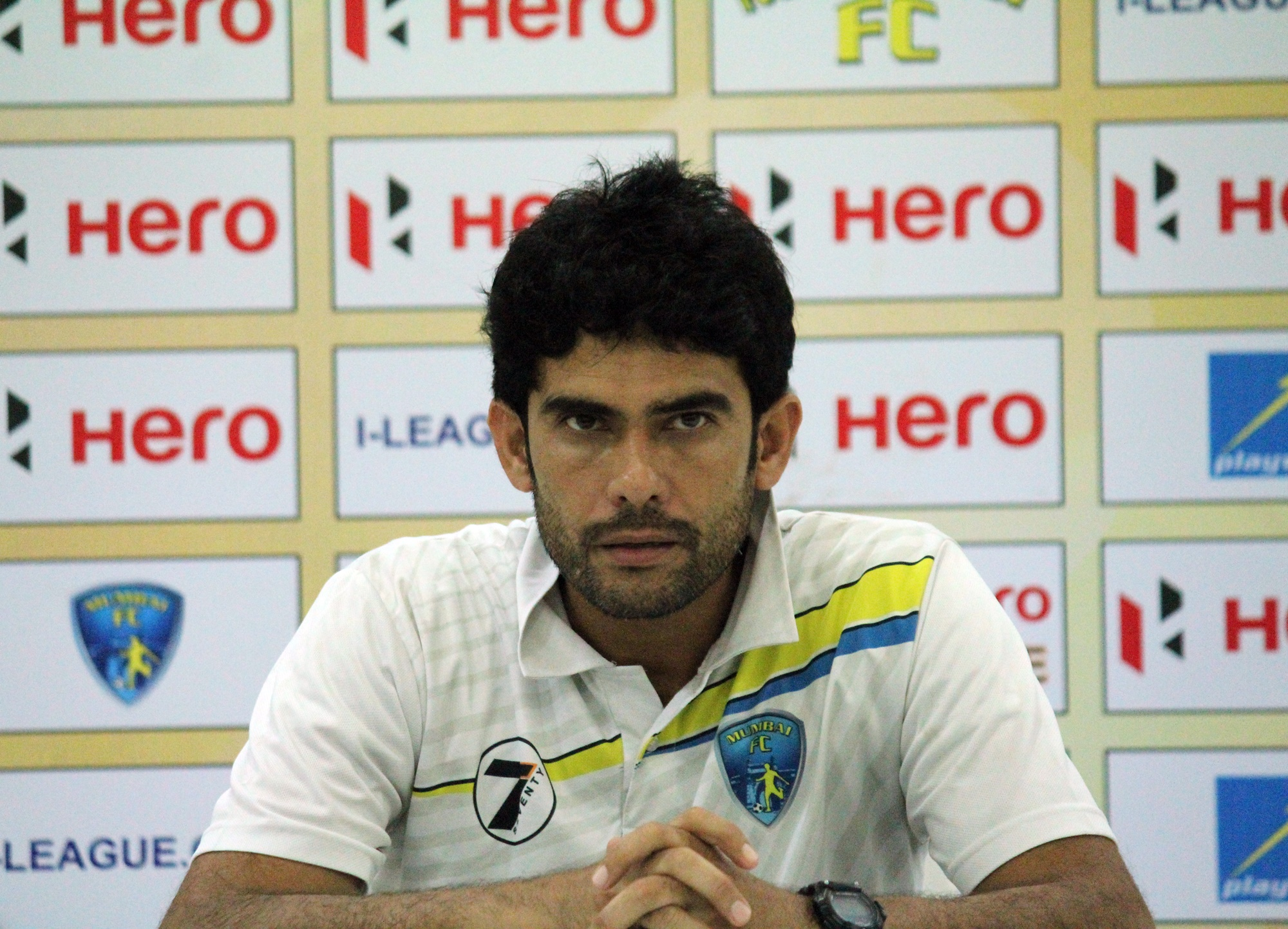
Khalid Jamil, Aizawl F.C's head coach

Position	Name
Team Manager	(India) Hmingthana Zadeng
Head coach	(India) Khalid Jamil
Assistant coach	(India) Abdul Azim Siddique

== Player statistics ==
=== Appearances and goals ===
No.	Pos	Nat	Player	Total		I-League		Federation Cup	
No.	Pos	Nat	Player	Apps	Goals	Apps	Goals	Apps	Goals
Goalkeepers
1	GK	(India) IND	Albino Gomes	21	0	18+0	0	3+0	0
21	GK	(India) IND	Zothanmawia	0	0	0+0	0	0+0	0
22	GK	(India) IND	Lalawmpuia	1	0	0+0	0	1+0	0
Defenders
3	DF	(Nigeria) NGR	Kingsley Obumneme	20	0	17+0	0	3+0	0
4	DF	(India) IND	Lalrinzuala Khiangte	11	0	5+5	0	1+0	0
5	DF	(India) IND	Zohmingliana Ralte	21	1	18+0	1	3+0	0
12	DF	(India) IND	Lalramhmunmawia	0	0	0+0	0	0+0	0
24	DF	(India) IND	Lalthakima	5	0	1+3	0	1+0	0
27	DF	(India) IND	Lalramchullova	18	2	11+4	1	3+0	1
29	DF	(India) IND	C Lallawmzuala	1	0	0+0	0	1+0	0
36	DF	(India) IND	Ashutosh Mehta	19	1	13+3	1	0+3	0
37	DF	(India) IND	Lalhriatrenga	1	0	0+0	0	1+0	0
39	DF	(India) IND	Lalruatthara	14	1	10+1	1	3+0	0
Midfielders
6	MF	(Syria) SYR	Mahmoud Amnah	19	3	15+1	2	3+0	1
7	MF	(India) IND	Lalnuntluanga	1	0	0+0	0	1+0	0
8	MF	(India) IND	H. Lalbiakthanga	5	0	2+1	0	0+2	0
10	MF	(India) IND	Rohmingthanga	0	0	0+0	0	0+0	0
11	MF	(India) IND	Albert Zohmingmawia	9	0	6+2	0	1+0	0
16	MF	(India) IND	Jayesh Rane	21	2	18+0	2	3+0	0
17	MF	(India) IND	Laldanmawia Ralte	19	6	10+5	3	3+1	3
18	MF	(India) IND	H. Lalmuankima	13	0	6+4	0	2+1	0
20	MF	(Liberia) LBR	Alfred Jaryan	20	0	17+0	0	3+0	0
23	MF	(India) IND	V Laltanpuia	12	0	3+9	0	0+0	0
28	MF	(India) IND	Rochharzela	0	0	0+0	0	0+0	0
30	MF	(India) IND	Brandon Vanlalremdika	17	3	11+3	3	2+1	0
Forwards
9	FW	(India) IND	T. Lalnunpuia	4	0	0+3	0	1+0	0
13	FW	(India) IND	Jonathan Lalrawngbawla	3	0	0+1	0	1+1	0
19	FW	(India) IND	Vanlalduatsanga	0	0	0+0	0	0+0	0
32	FW	(Ivory Coast) CIV	Kamo Stephane Bayi	20	7	17+0	7	3+0	0
49	FW	(India) IND	William Lalnunfela	11	1	0+8	1	1+2	0

- Source: soccerway

Updated: 14 May 2017

=== Top scorers ===
Rank	No.	Pos	Nat	Player	I-League	Federation Cup	Total
1	32	FW	(Ivory Coast)	Kamo Stephane Bayi	7	0	7
2	17	MF	(India)	Laldanmawia Ralte	3	3	6
3	6	MF	(Syria)	Mahmoud Amnah	2	1	3
3	30	MF	(India)	Brandon Vanlalremdika	3	0	3
5	27	DF	(India)	Lalramchullova	1	1	2
5	16	MF	(India)	Jayesh Rane	2	0	2
6	5	DF	(India)	Zohmingliana Ralte	1	0	1
6	36	DF	(India)	Ashutosh Mehta	1	0	1
6	39	DF	(India)	Lalruatthara	1	0	1
6	49	FW	(India)	William Lalnunfela	1	0	1
TOTALS					22	5	27

Source: soccerway
Updated: 14 May 2017

=== Clean sheets ===
Rank	No.	Pos	Nat	Player	I-League	Federation Cup	Total
1	1	GK	(India)	Albino Gomes	8	0	8
2	1	GK	(India)	Lalawmpuia	0	1	1
TOTALS					8	1	9

Source: soccerway
Updated: 14 May 2017

=== Disciplinary record ===
Rank	No.	Pos	Nat	Player	I-League		Federation Cup		Total		Notes
Rank	No.	Pos	Nat	Player	Yellow card	Red card	Yellow card	Red card	Yellow card	Red card	Notes
1	3	DF	(Nigeria)	Kingsley Obumneme	6	0	1	0	7	0	Missed a game, against Minerva Punjab (4 yellow cards) (11 March 2017)
2	39	MF	(India)	Lalruatthara	5	0	1	0	5	0	Missed a game, against Churchill Brothers (4 yellow cards) (10 February 2017)
3	20	MF	(Liberia)	Alfred Jaryan	4	0	0	0	4	0	Missed a game, against Shillong Lajong (4 yellow cards) (30 April 2017)
3	36	MF	(India)	Ashutosh Mehta	4	0	0	0	4	0	Missed a game, against Shillong Lajong (4 yellow cards) (30 April 2017)
5	5	DF	(India)	Zohmingliana Ralte	3	0	0	0	3	0	
5	6	DF	(Syria)	Mahmoud Amnah	2	0	1	0	3	0	
7	1	GK	(India)	Albino Gomes	1	0	1	0	2	0	
7	5	DF	(India)	Lalrinzuala Khiangte	2	0	0	0	2	0	
7	16	FW	(India)	Jayesh Rane	2	0	0	0	2	0	
7	27	DF	(India)	Lalramchullova	1	0	1	0	2	0	
11	17	MF	(India)	Laldanmawia Ralte	1	0	0	0	1	0	
11	32	FW	(Ivory Coast)	Kamo Stephane Bayi	1	0	0	0	1	0	
11	49	FW	(India)	William Lalnunfela	1	0	0	0	1	0	
TOTALS					33	0	5	0	38	0	

Source: soccerway
Updated: 14 May 2017

== See also ==
- 2016–17 in Indian football
