= 2016–17 East Bengal FC season =

Indian football club season

East Bengal
2016–17 season
- President: Dr Pranab Dasgupta
- Head-Coach: (England) Trevor James Morgan (until 17 April 2017) (India) Mridul Banerjee (until 19 April 2017) (India) Ranjan Chowdhury (Note: Caretaker manager under Technical-Director Monoranjan Bhattacharya.) (from 20 April 2017)
- Stadium: Salt Lake Stadium; Barasat Stadium; East Bengal Ground
- I-League: 3rd
- Calcutta Football League: Champions
- Federation Cup: Semi-finals
- Bordoloi Trophy: Runners-up
- Top goalscorer: League: Willis Plaza (9); All: Willis Plaza; Wedson Anselme (9 each)
- Highest home attendance: 29067
- Lowest home attendance: 6000
- Average home league attendance: 15427
Home colours	Away colours

The 2016–17 season was the East Bengal FC's 97th season in existence. The club had already won the Calcutta Football League and became the runners of 2016 Bordoloi Trophy.

== Pre-Season Overview ==
The club signed Calum Angus, an English defender to strengthen the defence for the Calcutta League. The Red and Gold Brigade are hoping to seal the CFL championship and set a hepta record. With the help of recent performances, the club clinched the 74th spot in the Asian Football Confederation club ranking, the highest among all Indian football clubs.

== Season Overview ==
=== August ===
The club started their Calcutta Football League campaign by beating Bhawanipore by 2–1. Then they went on winning all the matches in the league.

=== September ===
Maintaining their winning streak of August, East Bengal went on to win all the matches in the league to win the Calcutta Football League for a record consecutive 7 times, bettering their own record of 1970–75. Mohun Bagan decided not to play the Kolkata Derby and East Bengal got a walk over which ensured the hepta league win.
East Bengal were crowned champions for a record 38th time in history and for the 7th consecutive season. This is also the 3rd time that they have won the league without dropping a single point.

=== October ===
The club went to play the 2016 Bordoloi Trophy. The team draw set East Bengal in Group B on the fixture of this tour. Due to the absence of almost all the main and first team players of the club (all out on loan in different clubs of Indian Super League), the junior and reserve bench players had taken part in it. The club brought Oluwaunmi Somide Adeleja on loan for the tournament. East Bengal started off well by defeating Bangladesh club Bongobi Agragami by 6–0. The club kept its winning streak by defeating United Sikkim F.C. by a comfortable margin of 2–0 and then ASEB SC by 3–0. Then the club went into the semis where they defeated Shillong Lajong F.C. by 1–0 to enter into the final. East Bengal FC played the final against Three Star Club (Nepal) where they lost 1–2 in extra time. The brilliant performance of the junior players throughout the tournament came to an end with the defeat in final match. But the fight of the junior brigade was appreciated wholeheartedly by the supporters of the club.

=== January ===
The club roped in Haitian Wedson Anselme from Sheikh Jamal Dhanmondi Club Bangladesh and Willis Plaza from Trinidad and Tobago to strengthen the forward line along with Robin Singh, Jackichand Singh, Thongkhosiem Haokip, Rowllin Borges and Romeo Fernandes to strengthen the squad. East Bengal also brought Ivan Bukenya from Uganda to fortify their defence.
The team played against Aizawl F.C. in the 2016-17 I-League opener, but drew the match on the dying minutes thanks to a late equalizer from Ivan Bukenya. Then they went to Pune to play DSK Shivajians where the forward line sparkled and East Bengal won 2–1. Then they defeated Churchill Brothers S.C. by 2–0. Then on 22 January 2017, East Bengal faced the defending champions Bengaluru FC. The defending champions went ahead early by a goal from C.K. Vineeth but East Bengal rallied from behind to win it 2–1 with the goals scored by Ivan Bukenya and Robin Singh. East Bengal continued their winning streak and won 6 games on the trot to lead the league table. They face their arch Rivals Mohun Bagan on 12 February at Siliguri.

=== February ===
The month of February didn't start too well for the Red and Gold brigade. Draws against arch rival Mohun Bagan and Shillong Lajong F.C. and then a 1–0 loss away to Aizawl F.C. halted the victory march. The team looked out of shape and confidence when they faced Bengaluru FC away on 25 February at Sree Kanteerava Stadium. However, East Bengal turned all predictions aside and won the match 3–1 thanks to a brace from Robin Singh and a wonder strike from Wedson Anselme. With 7 matches to go, East Bengal currently sits at the top of the table for now.

=== March ===
By the time March came, East Bengal started bottling, like they always do. East Bengal were leading at the beginning of the March, but ended the season in the third position.

== Transfers ==
=== In ===
No.	Pos.	Name	Signed from	Month	Ref.
10	FW	(Haiti) Wedson Anselme	Free Agent	December	
9	FW	(Trinidad and Tobago) Willis Plaza	Free Agent	January	
4	DF	(Uganda) Ivan Bukenya	Free Agent	December	
11	FW	(India) Jackichand Singh	(India) Salgaocar	December	
24	FW	(India) Robin Singh (footballer)	Free Agent	January	
15	FW	(Australia) Chris Payne	Free Agent	January	

=== Out ===
Pos.	Name	Sold to	Month	Ref.
DF	(India) Harmanjot Khabra	(India) Bengaluru FC	N/A	
MF	(South Korea) Do Dong-Hyun		N/A	

== Kit ==
Supplier: Shiv Naresh / Sponsors: Kingfisher Premium, Peerless

Home	Away

=== First-team squad ===
As of 15 January 2017.

Note: Flags indicate national team as defined under FIFA eligibility rules; some limited exceptions apply. Players may hold more than one non-FIFA nationality.

No.	Pos.	Nation	Player
1	GK	IND	Subhasish Roy Chowdhury
2	DF	IND	Robin Gurung (on loan from NorthEast United)
3	DF	IND	Arnab Mondal
4	DF	UGA	Ivan Bukenya
5	DF	IND	Rahul Bheke
6	FW	AUS	Chris Payne
8	MF	IND	Mohammed Rafique
9	FW	TTO	Willis Plaza
10	FW	HAI	Wedson Anselme
11	MF	IND	Jackichand Singh
12	MF	IND	Rowllin Borges
13	GK	IND	Rehenesh TP (on loan from NorthEast United)
14	MF	IND	Mehtab Hossain
16	DF	IND	Gurwinder Singh

No.	Pos.	Nation	Player
17	DF	IND	Narayan Das
18	MF	IND	David Lalrinmuana
19	DF	IND	Robert Lalthlamuana
20	MF	IND	Lalrindika Ralte
21	FW	IND	Thongkhosiem Haokip
22	DF	IND	Mehtab Singh
23	MF	IND	Bikash Jairu
24	FW	IND	Robin Singh (on loan from FC Goa)
25	MF	IND	Cavin Lobo
27	MF	IND	Nikhil Poojari
28	MF	IND	Romeo Fernandes (on loan from Goa)
30	GK	IND	Luis Barreto
31	GK	IND	Dibyendu Sarkar
34	MF	IND	Abhinas Ruidas
50	DF	IND	Anwar Ali

== Technical Staff ==
Position	Name
Head coach	(England) Trevor Morgan
1st Assistant Coach	(England) Warren Hackett
Goalkeeper coach	(India) Abhijit Mondal
Club Doctor	(India) Dr. Shantiranjan Dasgupta
Team Media Officer	(India) Gautam Roy

== Competitions ==
=== Overall ===
Competition	First match	Last match	Final position
Calcutta Football League	4 August 2016	18 September 2016	Champions
Bordoloi Trophy	22 September 2016	30 September 2016	Runners-up
I-League	7 January 2017	29 April 2017	3rd
Federation Cup	7 May 2017	14 May 2017	Semi-finals

=== Overview ===
Competition	Record							
Competition	Pld	W	D	L	GF	GA	GD	Win %
Calcutta Football League	10	10	0	0	19	6	+13	100.00
Bordoloi Trophy	5	4	0	1	13	2	+11	80.00
I-League	18	10	3	5	33	15	+18	55.56
Federation Cup	4	1	2	1	3	3	+0	25.00
Total	37	25	5	7	68	26	+42	67.57

Last updated: 1 May 2017
Source: Competitions

=== Calcutta Football League ===
==== Table ====
Pos	Team	Pld	W	D	L	GF	GA	GD	Pts	Qualification or relegation
1	East Bengal (Note: East Bengal were awarded 3 points in the match against Mohun Bagan as Mohun Bagan refused to field a team for the match citing inadequate time for practice. The result of the match was declared by IFA to be 3–0 in favour of East Bengal.) (C)	10	10	0	0	19	6	+13	30	Champion
2	Mohammedan	10	6	2	2	13	7	+6	20	
3	Mohun Bagan	10	6	1	3	20	7	+13	19	
4	Southern Samity	10	4	3	3	11	8	+3	15	
5	Peerless SC	10	3	5	2	12	11	+1	14	

Source: Soccerway
(C) Champions

==== Fixtures & results ====
Win Draw Loss

4 August 2016 1	East Bengal	2–1	Bhawanipore	Kalyani
14:00 IST	Jiten Murmu 21'; Lalrindika Ralte 53'	Report	Orok Essien 32'	Stadium: Kalyani Stadium

7 August 2016 2	East Bengal	2–0	Peerless	Kalyani
14:00 IST	Rahul Bheke 18'; Arnab Mondal 30'	Report		Stadium: Kalyani Stadium

12 August 2016 3	East Bengal	2–1	Army XI	Kolkata
17:00 IST	Rafique 48'; Jiten Murmu 58'	Report	Alwyn 78'	Stadium: Barasat Stadium

16 August 2016 4	East Bengal	4–3	United	Kolkata
17:00 IST	Lalrindika Ralte 48', 89'; Do Dong-Hyun 73' (pen.); Arnab Mondal 79'	Report	Monotosh Chakladar 16'; Bello Razaq 53' (pen.); V.P. Suhair 63'	Stadium: Barasat Stadium

21 August 2016 5	East Bengal	1–0	Tollygunge Agragami	Kolkata
17:00 IST	Calum Angus 73'	Report		Stadium: Barasat Stadium

27 August 2016 6	East Bengal	2–1	Southern Samity	Kolkata
17:00 IST	Jiten Murmu 35'; Do Dong-Hyun 45+2'	Report	Basanta Singh 72' (pen.)	Stadium: Barasat Stadium

1 September 2016 7	East Bengal	1–0	George Telegraph	Kolkata
17:00 IST	Do Dong-Hyun 74'	Report		Stadium: Barasat Stadium

7 September 2016 8^{(KD)}	East Bengal	3–0	Mohun Bagan	Kalyani
14:00 IST		Report		Stadium: Kalyani Stadium
Note: Walkover given by Mohun Bagan.

15 September 2016 9	East Bengal	1–0	Mohammedan Sporting	Kalyani
14:00 IST	Do Dong-Hyun 72' (pen.)	Report		Stadium: Kalyani Stadium

18 September 2016 10	East Bengal	1–0	Aryan	Kolkata
14:00 IST	Adelaja 22'	Report		Stadium: Barasat Stadium

=== Bordoloi Trophy ===
==== Group B ====
Pos	Team	Pld	W	D	L	GF	GA	GD	Pts	Qualification
1	(India) East Bengal	3	3	0	0	11	0	+11	9	Knock-out Stage
2	(India) United Sikkim	3	1	1	1	2	3	−1	4	Knock-out Stage
3	(India) Assam State Electricity Board	3	1	1	1	2	4	−2	4	
4	(Bangladesh) Bongobi Agragami	3	0	0	3	0	8	−8	0	

First match(es) will be played: 20 September 2016. Source: kolkatafootball.com

==== Knock-out Stage ====
Semi-Finals
(Nepal) Three Star Club	4
(India) United Sikkim F.C.	1
(India) East Bengal	1
(India) Shillong Lajong	0

Final
(Nepal) Three Star Club (aet)	2
(India) East Bengal	1

==== Fixtures & results ====
Win Draw Loss

22 September 2016 Group Stage	East Bengal	6–0	Bongobi Agragami	Guwahati
19:00 IST	Adelaja 6'; Do-dong 34', 67' (pen.); Jiten Murmu 49'; Prohlad 62'; Nikhil Poojari 85'	Report		Stadium: Nehru Stadium

24 September 2016 Group Stage	East Bengal	2–0	United Sikkim	Guwahati
19:00 IST	Jiten Murmu 73'; Adelaja 84'	Report		Stadium: Nehru Stadium

26 September 2016 Group Stage	East Bengal	3–0	Assam State Electricity Board	Guwahati
19:00 IST	Do-dong 6'; Prohlad 12'; Yami Longvah 68'	Report		Stadium: Nehru Stadium

28 September 2016 Semi-final	East Bengal	1–0	Shillong Lajong	Guwahati
19:00 IST	Adelaja 17'	Report		Stadium: Nehru Stadium

30 September 2016 Final	Three Star Club	2–1 (a.e.t.)	East Bengal	Guwahati
19:00 IST	Devendra 90+2'; Bimal 99'	Report	Adelaja 82'	Stadium: Nehru Stadium

=== I-League ===
==== Table ====
Pos	Team	Pld	W	D	L	GF	GA	GD	Pts	Qualification or relegation
1	Aizawl (C)	18	11	4	3	24	14	+10	37	Qualification to Champions League qualifier
2	Mohun Bagan	18	10	6	2	27	12	+15	36	
3	East Bengal	18	10	3	5	33	15	+18	33	
4	Bengaluru	18	8	6	4	30	15	+15	30	Qualification to AFC Cup qualifying play-off (Note: Bengaluru qualified for the 2018 AFC Cup by winning the 2016–17 Federation Cup.)
5	Shillong Lajong	18	7	5	6	24	23	+1	26	

Source: IndiaFooty.com
Rules for classification: 1) points; 2) head-to-head points; 3) head-to-head goal difference; 4) goal difference; 5) number of goals scored; 6) drawing of lots
(C) Champions

==== Fixtures & results ====
Win Draw Loss

7 January 2017 1	East Bengal	1–1	Aizawl	Kolkata
16:30 IST	Rahul Bheke (yellow card) 34'; Ivan Bukenya 90'	Report	Gurwinder Singh(o.g.) 45+1'; Lalruatthara (yellow card) 73'; Kamo Stephane Bayi (yellow card) 90+4'	Stadium: Barasat Stadium; Referee: Om Prakash Thakur

14 January 2017 2	DSK Shivajians	1–2	East Bengal	Pune
19:00 IST	Soram Anganba (yellow card) 13'; Nirmal Chhetri (yellow card) 45'; Gouramangi Singh 64'	Report	Wedson Anselme 20' (pen.); Lalrindika Ralte (yellow card) 53'; Robin Gurung (yellow card) 64'; Willis Plaza 80'; Mehtab Hossain (yellow card) 90+1'	Stadium: Balewadi Stadium; Referee: R. Venkatesh

18 January 2017 3	Churchill Brothers	0–2	East Bengal	Vasco da Gama
16:30 IST		Report	Thongkhosiem Haokip 31'; Mehtab Hossain (yellow card) 34'; Narayan Das (yellow card) 42'; Ivan Bukenya 45+1'; Nikhil Poojari (yellow card) 48'	Stadium: Tilak Maidan Stadium; Referee: C.R. Srikrishna

22 January 2017 4	East Bengal	2–1	Bengaluru	Kolkata
14:35 IST	Ivan Bukenya 28'; Mehtab Hossain (yellow card) 31'; Lalrindika Ralte (yellow card) 34'; Robin Singh 79'	Report	C.K. Vineeth 22'; Sunil Chhetri (yellow card) 31'; Sena Ralte (yellow card) 78'	Stadium: Barasat Stadium; Referee: Ajit Meitei

29 January 2017 5	Minerva Punjab	0–5	East Bengal	Ludhiana
14:35 IST		Report	Wedson Anselme 8', 63' (pen.), 66'; Willis Plaza 40'; Robin Singh 65'	Stadium: Guru Nanak Stadium; Referee: Umesh Bora

1 February 2017 6	East Bengal	2–0	Mumbai	Kolkata
19:05 IST	Willis Plaza 10', 17'; Mehtab Hossain (yellow card) 90+4'	Report	Pratik Chaudhari (yellow card) 77'; Steven Dias (yellow card) 83'; Shilton D'Silva (yellow card) 87'	Stadium: Barasat Stadium; Referee: A. Rowan

5 February 2017 7	East Bengal	3–0	Chennai City	Kolkata
19:05 IST	Robin Singh (yellow card) 38'; Wedson Anselme 50'; Willis Plaza 75'; Lalrindika Ralte 90+6' (pen.)	Report		Stadium: Barasat Stadium; Referee: Rahul Kumar Gupta

12 February 2017 8^{(KD)}	East Bengal	0–0	Mohun Bagan	Siliguri
14:35 IST	Lalrindika Ralte (yellow card) 44'; Mehtab Hossain (yellow card) 67'	Report		Stadium: Kanchenjunga Stadium; Attendance: 29067; Referee: C.R. Srikrishna

15 February 2017 9	East Bengal	1–1	Shillong Lajong	Siliguri
14:35 IST	Gurwinder Singh (yellow card) 35'; Willis Plaza 45'; Narayan Das (yellow card) 86'	Report	Lalmuanpiua 20'; Chinglensana Singh (yellow card) 60'; Nim Dorjee Tamang (yellow card) 88'	Stadium: Kanchenjunga Stadium; Referee: Santosh Kumar

20 February 2017 10	Aizawl	1–0	East Bengal	Aizawl
14:05 IST	Lalramchullova (yellow card) 55'; Laldanmawia Ralte 58'	Report	Ivan Bukenya (yellow card) 55'; Lalrindika Ralte (yellow card) 56'; Arnab Mondal (yellow card) 87'	Stadium: Rajiv Gandhi Stadium; Referee: Umesh Bora

25 February 2017 11	Bengaluru	1–3	East Bengal	Bengaluru
19:05 IST	Harmanjot Khabra (yellow card) 66'; Sunil Chhetri (yellow card) 69'; C.K. Vineeth 85' (yellow card) 88'	Report	Wedson Anselme 23'; Robin Singh 54', 59'	Stadium: Sree Kanteerava Stadium; Referee: R. Venkatesh

4 March 2017 12	Shillong Lajong	1–2	East Bengal	Shillong
14:35 IST	Samuel Lalmuanpuia (yellow card) 54'; Aser Pierrick Dipanda 64'; Chinglensana Singh (yellow card) 79'	Report	Chris Payne 9', 33'; Gurwinder Singh (yellow card) 54'; Robert Lalthlamuana (yellow card) 69'	Stadium: Jawaharlal Nehru Stadium; Referee: Om Prakash Thakur

7 March 2017 13	East Bengal	1–2	Churchill Brothers	Kolkata
14:35 IST	Ivan Bukenya (yellow card) 36'; Chris Payne 67'; Robin Singh (yellow card) 70'	Report	Anthony Wolfe 9'; Ansumana Kromah 34'; Rowilson Rodrigues (yellow card) 61'; Bektur Talgat Uulu (yellow card) 90+2'	Stadium: Barasat Stadium; Referee: Santosh Kumar

12 March 2017 14	Chennai City	2–1	East Bengal	Chennai
19:05 IST	Nanda Kumar 57'; Denson Devadas (yellow card) 77'; K Prasanth 90+2'	Report	Willis Plaza 42'	Stadium: Jawaharlal Nehru Stadium; Referee: Tejas Nagvenkar

9 April 2017 15^{(KD)}	Mohun Bagan	2-1	East Bengal	Siliguri
19:05 IST	Raju Gaikwad (yellow card) 17'; Sony Norde 35'; Azharuddin Mallick 43' (yellow card) 43'	Report	Willis Plaza (red card) 66'; Gurwinder Singh (yellow card) 71'; Chris Payne (yellow card) 75'; Rowllin Borges 90+2'	Stadium: Kanchenjunga Stadium; Referee: A. Rowan

16 April 2017 16	East Bengal	0-1	DSK Shivajians	Kolkata
14:35 IST	Robin Singh (yellow card) 57'	Report	Jerry 29' (yellow card) 62'; Jerry Lalrinzuala (yellow card) 38'	Stadium: Barasat Stadium; Referee: Palmson M. Raj

23 April 2017 17	East Bengal	3-1	Minerva Punjab	Kolkata
14:30 IST	Narayan Das (yellow card) 8'; Wedson Anselme 31'; Robin Singh 52' (pen.); Bikash Jairu 90'	Report	Arshdeep Singh (yellow card) 22'; Krishna Pandit 90+4'	Stadium: Barasat Stadium; Referee: Ajit Mettei

29 April 2017 18	Mumbai	0-4	East Bengal	Mumbai
19:05 IST	Densill Theobald (yellow card) 90'	Report	Bikash Jairu 7'; Willis Plaza 40', 68'; Wedson Anselme 62'	Stadium: Cooperage Ground; Referee: C.R. Srikrishna

=== Federation Cup ===
Group A
Pos	Team	Pld	W	D	L	GF	GA	GD	Pts	Qualification
1	Aizawl	3	2	1	0	5	3	+2	7	Advance to semi-finals
2	East Bengal	3	1	2	0	3	1	+2	5	Advance to semi-finals
3	Chennai City	3	1	0	2	5	6	−1	3	
4	Churchill Brothers	3	0	1	2	3	6	−3	1	

Source: AIFF

==== Knock-out Stage ====
Semi-Finals
Aizawl	0
Bengaluru FC	1
Mohun Bagan	2
East Bengal	0

Final
Bengaluru FC	2
Mohun Bagan	0

==== Fixtures & results ====
Win Draw Loss

7 May 2017 Group Stage	East Bengal	1–1	Churchill Brothers	Cuttack
16:00 IST	Ivan Bukenya (yellow card) 13'; Gurwinder Singh (yellow card) 44'; Wedson Anselme 66'	Report	Ansumana Kromah (yellow card) 38' (goal) 81'	Stadium: Barabati Stadium

9 May 2017 Group Stage	Chennai City	0–2	East Bengal	Cuttack
16:00 IST	Mehtab Hossain (yellow card) 18'; Robin Singh 45+1', 77' (pen.) (yellow card) 45+3'; Willis Plaza (yellow card) 45+2'; Gurwinder Singh (yellow card) 52'; Narayan Das (yellow card) 57'	Report	Debabrata (yellow card) 72'; Dharmaraj Ravanan (yellow card) 76'	Stadium: Barabati Stadium

11 May 2017 Group Stage	Aizawl	0–0	East Bengal	Cuttack
19:00 IST		Report		Stadium: Barabati Stadium; Referee: A. Rowan

14 May 2017 Semi-final	Mohun Bagan	2–0	East Bengal	Cuttack
16:00 IST	Duffy 35'; Sehnaj Singh (yellow card) 74'; B.Singh 84'	Report	Gurwinder Singh (yellow card) 40'	Stadium: Barabati Stadium; Referee: Santhosh Kumar

== Statistics ==
=== Appearances ===
Players with no appearances are not included in the list.
As of end of 2016-17 season.

No.	Pos.	Nat.	Name	CFL		I League		Fed Cup		Bordoloi		Total	
No.	Pos.	Nat.	Name	Apps	Starts	Apps	Starts	Apps	Starts	Apps	Starts	Apps	Starts
Goalkeepers
13	GK	(India)	TP Rehnesh	–		15	15	1	0	–		16	15
1	GK	(India)	Subhasish Roy Chowdhury	–		3	3	4	4	–		7	7
30	GK	(India)	Luis Barreto	5	5	0	0	0	0	2	2	7	7
31	GK	(India)	Dibyendu Sarkar	4	4	0	0	–		4	3	8	7
Defenders
4	DF	(Uganda)	Ivan Bukenya	–		18	17	2	2	–		20	19
5	DF	(India)	Rahul Bheke	6	6	15	15	4	4	–		25	25
4	DF	(England)	Callum Angus	8	7	–				4	4	12	11
16	DF	(India)	Gurwinder Singh	4	4	14	13	3	3	–		21	20
17	DF	(India)	Narayan Das	6	6	13	12	4	4	–		23	22
19	DF	(India)	Robert Lalthlamuana	6	3	7	5	0	0	–		13	8
50	DF	(India)	Anwar Ali	–		5	4	0	0	–		5	4
3	DF	(India)	Arnab Mondal	7	7	4	2	2	2	–		13	11
2	DF	(India)	Robin Gurung	–		5	3	0	0	–		5	3
25	DF	(India)	Samad Ali Mallick	4	3	0	0	1	1	5	5	10	9
28	DF	(India)	Kaushik Sarkar	2	1	–				1	1	3	2
29	DF	(India)	Deepak Singh	1	0	–				5	5	6	5
-	DF	(India)	Aspreet Singh	–		–				5	5	5	5
22	DF	(India)	Mehtab Singh	–		0	0	0	0	0	0	0	0
Midfielders
14	MF	(India)	Mehtab Hossain	8	8	16	15	3	3	–		27	26
10	MF	(Haiti)	Wedson Anselme	–		15	14	4	4	–		19	18
27	MF	(India)	Nikhil Poojari	4	1	14	14	2	1	2	2	22	18
20	MF	(India)	Lalrindika Ralte	8	8	13	9	2	0	–		23	17
12	MF	(India)	Rowlin Borges	–		12	10	4	4	–		16	14
28	MF	(India)	Romeo Fernandes	–		8	2	1	0	–		9	2
11	MF	(India)	Jackichand Singh	–		7	3	0	0	–		7	3
27	MF	(India)	Prohlad Roy	4	1	–				5	5	9	6
34	MF	(India)	Abhinash Ruidas	9	7	7	4	0	0	–		16	11
8	MF	(India)	Mohammed Rafique	7	7	5	3	3	2	–		15	12
23	MF	(India)	Bikash Jairu	6	2	4	2	4	4	–		14	8
7	MF	(India)	Cavin Lobo	0	0	2	2	2	1	–		4	3
21	MF	(South Korea)	Do Dong-Hyun	9	6	–				5	5	14	11
-	MF	(India)	Yami Longvah	–						4	4	4	4
-	MF	(India)	Prakash Sarkar	–						3	3	3	3
-	MF	(India)	Lalruatkima	–						2	1	2	1
18	MF	(India)	David Lalrinmuana	–		1	0	–				1	0
Forwards
9	FW	(Trinidad and Tobago)	Willis Plaza	–		14	12	4	4	–		18	16
26	FW	(India)	Jiten Murmu	8	8	–				5	5	13	13
22	FW	(Nigeria)	Adilaja Somide	7	5	–				5	5	12	10
24	FW	(India)	Robin Singh	–		14	9	4	1	–		18	10
21	FW	(India)	Thongkhosiem Haokip	–		8	3	0	0	–		8	3
6	FW	(Australia)	Chris Payne	–		7	6	–				7	6
15	FW	(Kyrgyzstan)	Ildar Amirov	–		2	1	–				2	1

=== Goal Scorers ===
Goals for East Bengal in 2016–17 season
Rank	No.	Pos.	Nat.	Name	CFL	Bordoloi	I League	Fed Cup	Total
1	9	FW	(Trinidad and Tobago)	Willis Plaza			9	0	9
1	10	FW	(Haiti)	Wedson Anselme			8	1	9
1	21	FW	(South Korea)	Do Dong-Hyun	4	3			7
4	24	FW	(India)	Robin Singh			5	2	7
5	22	FW	(Nigeria)	Adilaja Somide	1	4			5
6	26	FW	(India)	Jiten Murmu	3	2			5
6	20	MF	(India)	Lalrindika Ralte	3		1	0	4
8	4	DF	(Uganda)	Ivan Bukenya			3	0	3
8	6	FW	(Australia)	Chris Payne			3		3
10	3	DF	(India)	Arnab Mondal	2		0	0	2
10	23	MF	(India)	Bikash Jairu	0		2	0	2
10	33	MF	(India)	Prohlad Roy	0	2			2
13	4	DF	(England)	Calum Angus	1				1
13	5	DF	(India)	Rahul Bheke	1		0	0	1
13	8	MF	(India)	Mohammed Rafique	1		0	0	1
13	12	MF	(India)	Rowlin Borges			1	0	1
13	21	FW	(India)	Thongkhosiem Haokip			1	0	1
13	27	MF	(India)	Nikhil Poojari	0	1	0	0	1
13		MF	(India)	Yami Longvah		1			1
Own Goals					0	0	0	0	0
TOTAL					16	13	33	3	65

== See also ==
- 2016–17 in Indian football
