= 2016 Bordoloi Trophy =

Tournament details
- Country: India
- Dates: 18 – 30 September 2016
- Teams: 8

Final positions
- Champions: Three Star Club (1st title)
- Runner-up: East Bengal
- Third place: Shillong Lajong; United Sikkim

Tournament statistics
- Matches played: 15
- Goals scored: 46 (3.07 per match)
- Top goal scorer(s): Kayode Ajayi Martin (Three Star Club); Adeleja (East Bengal)

Awards
- Best player: Calum James Angus (East Bengal)
- All statistics correct as of 28 September 2016. Live telecast on Prag News

The 2016 Bordoloi Trophy was the 64th season of the Bordoloi Trophy, which was hosted in the state of Assam. The tournament is also known as the Bharat Ratna Lokapriya Gopinath Bordoloi Trophy and commenced on 18 September and concluded with the final on 30 September 2016. Eight teams will participate in the tournament, with two of the teams being from Nepal and Bangladesh respectively.

Three Star Club from Nepal won the title after defeating East Bengal 2–1 in the final. Defender Bijaya Dhimal was adjudged best player of the tournament while Bimal Magar walked away with the "Man of the Match" in the final. East Bengal’s Dibyendu Sarkar was named the best goal keeper while Kayode Ajayi Martin of Three Star Club and Adeleja of East Bengal received the highest scorer’s trophy.

== Teams ==
| Teams | Country |
|---|---|
| Bongobi Agragami | Bangladesh |
| Assam State Electricity Board | India |
| Barak Flamingoz | India |
| East Bengal | India |
| Oil India | India |
| Shillong Lajong | India |
| United Sikkim | India |
| Three Star Club | Nepal |

== Venues ==
The Nehru Stadium in Guwahati, Assam was announced as the venue for the tournament.

| Guwahati, Assam | 2016 Bordoloi Trophy (Assam) |
| Nehru Stadium | 2016 Bordoloi Trophy (Assam) |
| Capacity: 15,000 | 2016 Bordoloi Trophy (Assam) |
| Nehru Stadium Guwahati | 2016 Bordoloi Trophy (Assam) |

== Group stage ==
=== Group A ===
| Pos | Team | Pld | W | D | L | GF | GA | GD | Pts | Qualification |
|---|---|---|---|---|---|---|---|---|---|---|
| 1 | (Nepal) Three Star Club | 3 | 1 | 2 | 0 | 8 | 3 | +5 | 5 | Knock-out Stage |
| 2 | (India) Shillong Lajong | 3 | 1 | 2 | 0 | 7 | 2 | +5 | 5 | Knock-out Stage |
| 3 | Oil India | 3 | 1 | 2 | 0 | 5 | 2 | +3 | 5 | |
| 4 | (India) Barak Flamingoz | 3 | 0 | 0 | 3 | 1 | 14 | −13 | 0 | |

Updated to match(es) played on 18 September 2016. Source: kolkatafootball.com
18 September 2016
19:00 IST

| Shillong Lajong (India) | 1–1 | Oil India |
|---|---|---|
| Issac 79' | Report | F.Wary 13' |

Nehru Stadium, Guwahati

19 September 2016
19:00 IST

| Three Star Club (Nepal) | 6–1 | (India) Barak Flamingoz |
|---|---|---|
| Martin 4'; Bijaya 22'; Nirajan 39'; Chemjong 51'; Sunil 73'; Bikram 83' | Report | Awang 43' |

Nehru Stadium, Guwahati

22 September 2016
19:00 IST

| Shillong Lajong (India) | 5–0 | (India) Barak Flamingoz |
|---|---|---|
| Milan 1', 23'; Issac 55' (pen.), 75'; Samuel 90+2' | Report |

Nehru Stadium, Guwahati

23 September 2016
19:00 IST

| Three Star Club (Nepal) | 1–1 | Oil India |
|---|---|---|
| Gurung 89' | Report | Rana 8' |

Nehru Stadium, Guwahati

25 September 2016
16:00 IST

| Barak Flamingoz (India) | 0–3 | Oil India |
|---|---|---|
| | Report | Jayanta 6'; Mintu 50', 78' |

Nehru Stadium, Guwahati

25 September 2016
19:00 IST

| Shillong Lajong (India) | 1–1 | (Nepal) Three Star Club |
|---|---|---|
| Milan 27' | Report | Nirajan 60' |

Nehru Stadium, Guwahati

=== Group B ===
| Pos | Team | Pld | W | D | L | GF | GA | GD | Pts | Qualification |
|---|---|---|---|---|---|---|---|---|---|---|
| 1 | (India) East Bengal | 3 | 3 | 0 | 0 | 11 | 0 | +11 | 9 | Knock-out Stage |
| 2 | (India) United Sikkim | 3 | 1 | 1 | 1 | 2 | 3 | −1 | 4 | Knock-out Stage |
| 3 | (India) Assam State Electricity Board | 3 | 1 | 1 | 1 | 2 | 4 | −2 | 4 | |
| 4 | (Bangladesh) Bongobi Agragami | 3 | 0 | 0 | 3 | 0 | 8 | −8 | 0 | |

First match(es) will be played: 20 September 2016. Source: kolkatafootball.com
20 September 2016
19:00 IST

| United Sikkim (India) | 1–1 | (India) Assam State Electricity Board |
|---|---|---|
| Sonam 59' | Report | Sanjoy 43' |

Nehru Stadium, Guwahati

22 September 2016
19:00 IST

| East Bengal (India) | 6–0 | (Bangladesh) Bongobi Agragami |
|---|---|---|
| Adelaja 6'; Do-dong 34', 67' (pen.); Jiten 49'; Prohlad 62'; Nikhil 85' | Report |

Nehru Stadium, Guwahati

24 September 2016
16:00 IST

| Assam State Electricity Board (India) | 1–0 | (Bangladesh) Bongobi Agragami |
|---|---|---|
| Narzary 73' | Report |

Nehru Stadium, Guwahati

24 September 2016
19:00 IST

| East Bengal (India) | 2–0 | (India) United Sikkim |
|---|---|---|
| Jiten 73'; Adelaja 84' | Report |

Nehru Stadium, Guwahati

26 September 2016
19:00 IST

| East Bengal (India) | 3–0 | (India) Assam State Electricity Board |
|---|---|---|
| Do-dong 6'; Prohlad 12'; Longvah 68' | Report |

Nehru Stadium, Guwahati

27 September 2016
19:00 IST

| United Sikkim (India) | 1–0 | (Bangladesh) Bongobi Agragami |
|---|---|---|
| Nema Lepcha 3' | Report |

Nehru Stadium, Guwahati

== Knock-out Stage ==
Semi-Finals
(Nepal) Three Star Club | 4
(India) United Sikkim F.C. | 1
(India) East Bengal | 1
(India) Shillong Lajong | 0

Final
(Nepal) Three Star Club (aet) | 2
(India) East Bengal | 1

=== Semi-finals ===
28 September 2016
16:00 IST

| Three Star Club (Nepal) | 4–1 | United Sikkim F.C. (India) |
|---|---|---|
| Martin 66', 94'; Bijaya 100'; Gurung 105' | Report | T.Lepcha 89' |

Nehru Stadium, Guwahati

28 September 2016
19:00 IST

| East Bengal (India) | 1–0 | (India) Shillong Lajong |
|---|---|---|
| Adelaja 17' | Report |

Nehru Stadium, Guwahati

=== Final ===
30 September 2016
19:00 IST

| Three Star Club (Nepal) | 2–1 (a.e.t.) | (India) East Bengal |
|---|---|---|
| Devendra 90+2'; Bimal 99' | Report | Adelaja 82' |

Nehru Stadium, Guwahati
