= 2018 CFL Premier Division =

CFL Premier Division
- Season: 2018–19
- Champions: Mohun Bagan (30th title)
- Matches: 117
- Goals: 275 (2.35 per match)

The 2018 Calcutta Football League Premier Division was the 121st season of the CFL Premier Division, a state association football league within the Indian state of West Bengal. The league is divided into two groups – Division A and Division B. The Championship title is awarded only to the Division A winner, while four teams from Division A are relegated to Division B at the end of the season and four teams from Division B are simultaneously promoted to Division A for the next season. The fixtures of Division A and Division B started on 3 and 5 August 2018, respectively.

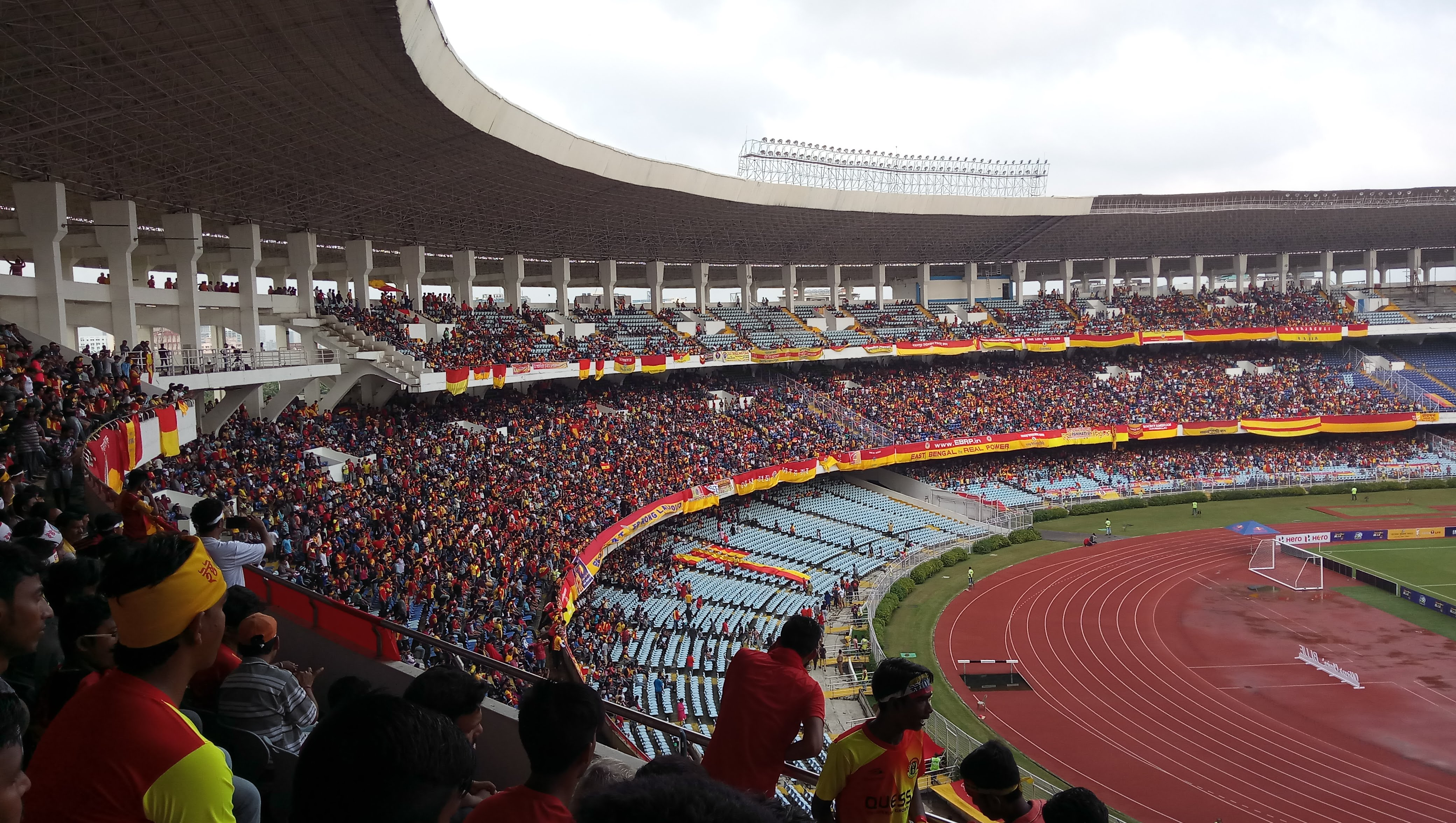
The Kolkata Derby of the 2018 CFL season on September 2.

== Premier Division A ==
CFL Premier Division A
- Season: 2018
- Champions: Mohun Bagan
- Relegated: FCI; WBP; Tollygunge Agragami; Pathachakra
- Matches: 66
- Goals: 165 (2.5 per match)
- Top goalscorer: (Liberia) Ansumana Kromah (Peerless SC) (11 goals)
- Biggest home win: Mohun Bagan 5–0 WBP; Mohun Bagan 5–0 FCI
- Highest scoring: Aryan 3–3 Pathachakra
- Longest winning run: East Bengal (5 matches)
- Longest unbeaten run: Mohun Bagan (11 matches)
- Longest winless run: WBP (9 matches)
- Longest losing run: Tollygunge Agragami (4 matches)
- Highest attendance: 65,322 (Mohun Bagan vs East Bengal FC)

=== Standings ===
Pos	Team	Pld	W	D	L	GF	GA	GD	Pts	Qualification or relegation
1	Mohun Bagan (C)	11	9	2	0	27	6	+21	29	Champion
2	Peerless SC	11	8	1	2	20	8	+12	25	
3	East Bengal	11	7	2	2	19	7	+12	23	
4	Mohammedan	11	6	1	4	12	8	+4	19	Qualified for I-League 2nd Division
5	Rainbow	11	5	2	4	15	13	+2	17	Qualified for I-League 2nd Division
6	George Telegraph	11	4	3	4	12	13	−1	15	
7	Calcutta Customs	11	3	5	3	13	12	+1	14	
8	Aryan	11	4	2	5	11	14	−3	14	
9	Pathachakra	11	3	4	4	15	17	−2	13	Relegation to Premier Division B
10	Tollygunge Agragami	11	2	2	7	12	21	−9	8	Relegation to Premier Division B
11	FCI	11	0	4	7	5	20	−15	4	Relegation to Premier Division B
12	West Bengal Police	11	0	2	9	4	26	−22	2	Relegation to Premier Division B

Updated to match(es) played on 26 September 2018. Source:
(C) Champions

=== Results ===
Home \ Away	ARN	CCU	EB	FCI	GT	MSC	MB	PAT	PRL	RAC	TA	WBP
Aryan	—	1–1	0–3	1–0	0–3	1–0	0–2	3–3	0–1	0–1	1–0	4–0
Calcutta Customs		—	0–0	1–1	0–1	0–1	0–2	3–1	3–1	2–2	2–2	1–0
East Bengal			—	1–0	2–1	1–2	2–2	3–0	1–2	1–0	3–0	2–0
FCI				—	1–1	0–1	0–5	1–1	0–2	0–1	1–5	1–1
George Telegraph					—	0–0	0–1	2–2	1–3	0–3	2–1	1–0
Mohammedan						—	1–2	3–0	0–1	1–0	1–2	2–1
Mohun Bagan							—	1–0	1–1	3–2	3–0	5–0
Pathachakra								—	1–0	1–1	2–0	4–0
Peerless SC									—	3–1	3–0	3–0
Rainbow										—	2–1	2–1
Tollygunge Agragami											—	1–1
West Bengal Police												—

Legend: Blue = home team win; Yellow = draw; Red = away team win.

==== Managers and foreigners ====
Club	Head coach	Foreigner 1	Foreigner 2	Foreigner 3	Foreigner 4
Aryan	(India) Debashish Nandy	(Ivory Coast) Seidu Mady	(Nigeria) Bello Razaq	(Ivory Coast) Gatch Arthure Diomande	(Nigeria) Emmanuel Chigozie
Calcutta Customs	(India) Rajeev Dey	(Nigeria) Samuel Kane	(Ghana) John Ampong	(Nigeria) Eze Stanley Ifeanyi	—
East Bengal	(India) Bastob Roy	(Syria) Mahmoud Amnah	(Senegal) Kassim Aidara	(Costa Rica) Jhonny Acosta	—
FCI (Eastern Zone)	(India) Sudeep Chakraborty	—	—	—	—
George Telegraph	(India) Ranjan Bhattacharya	(Nigeria) Echezona Anyichie	(Japan) Reo Nakamura	(Nigeria) Justice Morgan	(Nigeria) Stephen Harry
Mohammedan	(India) Sudeep Sarkar	(Ivory Coast) Lancine Touré	(Ivory Coast) Bazie Armand	(Nigeria) Olariche Princewill Emeka	(Ghana) Philip Adjah
Mohun Bagan	(India) Sankarlal Chakraborty	(Cameroon) Aser Pierrick Dipanda	(Nigeria) Eze Kingsley	(Uganda) Henry Kisekka	(Japan) Yuta Kinowaki
Pathachakra	(India) Anjan Nath	(Zimbabwe) Victor Kamhuka	(Croatia) Anto Pejic	(Japan) Futa Nakamura	(Ghana) Bright Middleton Mends
Peerless	(India) Tapan Chakraborty	(Liberia) Ansumana Kromah	(Trinidad and Tobago) Anthony Wolfe	(Nigeria) Chika Wali	—
Rainbow	(India) Tarit Ghosh	(Nigeria) Joel Sunday	(Nigeria) Penn Orji	(Ghana) Godwin Quashiga	(Ivory Coast) Guy Eric Dano
Tollygunge Agragami	(India) Bimal Ghosh	(Nigeria) Daniel Bedemi	(Nigeria) Richard Agwu Somtochukwu	(Ivory Coast) Lago Dagbo Bei	(Ivory Coast) Kamo Stephane Bayi
West Bengal Police	(India) Sahadeb Bhowmick	—	—	—	—

=== Stadiums ===
Stadium	Capacity
Mohun Bagan/CCFC Ground	22,000
East Bengal/Aryan Ground	23,500
Mohammedan/Howrah Union Ground	15,000
Vivekananda Yubabharati Krirangan	85,000
Barasat Stadium	22,000
Kalyani Stadium	20,000
Gayespur Stadium	12,000

=== Attendance ===
==== Derby attendance ====
- Mohun Bagan vs East Bengal FC— 65,322
- Mohun Bagan vs Mohammedan SC— 12,317
- East Bengal Club vs Mohammedan SC— 12,557

=== Statistics ===
- Goal by Indians- 58 goals
- Goal by Foreigners- 92 goals

==== Top scorers ====
As of 19 September 2018

Source: kolkatafootball.com

11 goals

- (Liberia) Ansumana Kromah (Peerless SC)

10 goals

- (Cameroon) Aser Pierrick Dipanda (Mohun Bagan)

6 goals

- (Nigeria) Joel Sunday (Rainbow)
- (Uganda) Henry Kisekka (Mohun Bagan)
- (Ghana) Bright Middleton Mends (Pathachakra)

5 goals

- (Ghana) John Ampong (Calcutta Customs)
- (Nigeria) Stephen Harry (George Telegraph)
- (Trinidad and Tobago) Anthony Wolfe (Peerless SC)
- (Nigeria) Justice Morgan (George Telegraph)
- (Nigeria) Emmanuel Chinedu (Aryan)

4 goals

- (Ivory Coast) Kamo Stephane Bayi (Tollygunge Agragami)
- (Ivory Coast) Gatch Arthure Diomande (Aryan)
- (Ghana) Philip Adjah (Mohammedan)
- (India) Jobby Justin (East Bengal)

3 goals

- (Nigeria) Emmanuel Chigozie (Aryan)
- (Nigeria) Eze Stanley Ifeanyi (Calcutta Customs)
- (India) Laldanmawia Ralte (East Bengal)
- (Nigeria) Princewell Emeka (Mohammedan)
- (Senegal) Kassim Aidara (East Bengal)
- (Ivory Coast) Lago Dagbo Bei (Tollygunge Agragami)

2 goals

- (India) Poltu Das (Rainbow)
- (Croatia) Anto Pejić (Pathachakra)
- (India) Azharuddin Mallick (Mohun Bagan)
- (India) Gopal Poddar (FCI)
- (India) Sk. Samim (West Bengal Police)
- (India) Narohari Srestha (Peerless SC)
- (India) Ashim Biswas (Tollygunge Agragami)
- (Zimbabwe) Victor Kamhuka (Pathachakra)
- (India) Bubai Das (Pathachakra)
- (India) Ujjal Howladar (Aryan)
- (Costa Rica) Jhonny Acosta (East Bengal)
- (India) Brandon Vanlalremdika (East Bengal)
- (India) Tirthankar Sarkar (Mohun Bagan)
- (India) Pintu Mahata (Mohun Bagan)

1 goal

- (India) Prosenjit Chakroborty (Mohammedan)
- (India) Lalrindika Ralte (East Bengal)
- (India) Abhishek Ambekar (Mohun Bagan)
- (India) Abhijit Sarkar (Rainbow)
- (India) Lakshmikant Mandi (Peerless SC)
- (India) Sumit Das (Mohammedan)
- (India) Nirmal Singh Bisht (Calcutta Customs)
- (Syria) Mahmoud Amnah (East Bengal)
- (India) William Lalnunfela (Mohun Bagan)
- (Nigeria) Penn Orji (Rainbow)
- (Ivory Coast) Guy Eric Dano (Rainbow)
- (India) Semboi Haokip (West Bengal Police)
- (India) Samad Ali Mallick (East Bengal)
- (India) Britto PM (Mohun Bagan)
- (India) Deep Halder (FCI)
- (Nigeria) Daniel Bedemi (Tollygunge Agragami)
- (India) Subho Kumar (George Telegraph)
- (India) Lalramchullova (East Bengal)
- (India) Amit Roy (Calcutta Customs)
- (India) Tonmoy Ghosh (Mohammedan)
- (India) Dipendu Dowary (Mohammedan)
- (India) Shilton D'Silva (Mohun Bagan)
- (India) Mehtab Singh (East Bengal)
- (India) Koushik Sarkar (East Bengal)
- (India) Ram Malik (Calcutta Customs)
- (India) Mrinmoy Samanta (FCI)
- (India) Khokon Das (Rainbow)
- (India) Govin Singh (Tollygunge Agragami)
- (India) Lalchhawnkima (Mohun Bagan)
- (Nigeria) Echezona Anyichie (George Telegraph)
- (India) Hira Mondal (Peerless SC)
- (India) Somananda Singh (Pathachakra)
- (India) Kunal Ghosh (Aryan)
- (India) Dipankar Podder (Pathachakra)
- (India) Sujoy Dutta (Rainbow)

==== Own goals ====
As of 19 September 2018

Source: kolkatafootball.com

- (India) Sandeep Debnath (WBP)

==== Clean sheets ====
As of 19 September 2018

Source: kolkatafootball.com

6 clean sheets

- (India) Rakshit Dagar (East Bengal)
- (India) Laltu Mondol (George Telegraph)

4 clean sheets

- (India) Priyant Singh (Mohammedan)
- (India) Sandeep Paul (Peerless)
- (India) Souvik Santra (Aryan)
- (India) Sankar Roy (Mohun Bagan)
- (India) Laltu Mondol (George Telegraph)

3 clean sheets

- (India) Shilton Paul (Mohun Bagan)
- (India) Dibyendu Sarkar (Rainbow)

2 clean sheets

- (India) Suvam Sen (Calcutta Customs)
- (India) Ubaid CK (East Bengal)

1 clean sheets

- (India) Arindam Ghosh (Pathachakra)
- (India) Arup Debnath (Mohammedan)
- (India) Abhijit Das (Pathachakra)

==== Hat-tricks ====
Player	For	Against	Result	Date	Ref
(Liberia) Ansumana Kromah	Peerless	George Telegraph	3–1	20 August 2018	
(Cameroon) Aser Pierrick Dipanda	Mohun Bagan	West Bengal Police	5–0	25 August 2018	
(Cameroon) Aser Pierrick Dipanda	Mohun Bagan	FCI	5–0	5 September 2018	

==== Fastest goals ====
Player	For	Against	Timing
(Nigeria) Stephen Harry	George Telegraph	Calcutta Customs	1 minute 10 seconds
(Cameroon) Aser Pierrick Dipanda	Mohun Bagan	West Bengal Police	1 minute 32 seconds
(Ghana) Philip Adjah	Mohammedan	Tollygunge Agragami	1 minute 35 Seconds

== Previous Division B ==
CFL Premier Division B
- Season: 2018–19
- Matches: 51
- Goals: 110 (2.16 per match)
- Highest scoring: Kalighat MS 4–0 v RLY
- Longest unbeaten run: Bhowanipore; BSS (5 matches)
- Longest winless run: Taltala (5 matches)
- All statistics correct as of 9 September 2018.

=== Standings ===
Pos	Team	Pld	W	D	L	GF	GA	GD	Pts	Qualification or relegation
1	Kalighat M.S.	13	8	3	2	28	10	+18	27	Promotion to Premier Division A
2	Southern Samity	13	7	4	2	19	10	+9	25	Promotion to Premier Division A
3	Bhowanipore	13	6	5	2	13	7	+6	23	Promotion to Premier Division A
4	BSS Sporting Club	13	6	3	4	17	14	+3	21	Promotion to Premier Division A
5	SAI	13	4	4	5	11	11	0	16	Championship Round
6	Railways FC	13	2	3	8	3	22	−19	9	Championship Round
7	Kidderpore SC	8	2	2	4	9	11	−2	8	Relegation Round
8	United	8	2	2	4	5	7	−2	8	Relegation Round
9	Taltala Dipti Sangha	8	0	2	6	5	18	−13	2	Relegation to First Division
10	Army XI (Note: Army XI withdrew from the competition due to some uncited reasons.)	0	0	0	0	0	0	0	0	Relegation to First Division

Notes:

Notes: 1.After the completion of the single round robin, the teams will be divided into two groups of top 6 and bottom 4. The top 6 teams will play against each other in a single-leg format, called the championship round, while the bottom 4 teams play against each other in the same single-leg format called the relegation round. Each team carries forward their points and other records from the previous 1st round matches into the championship or the relegation round. Overall 4 teams are promoted.

=== Results ===
Home \ Away	Army XI	BSS S.C.	BSC	KMS	KSC	RLY	SAI	SOU	TDS	USC
Army XI	—									
BSS S.C.		—	1–1	3–0			1–0	0–0	1–0	
Bhowanipore		1–1	—		2–0	2–0	1–0		0–0	
Kalighat MS		0–3		—	2–0	4–0	0–0	1–3		
Kidderpore SC			0–2	0–2	—		0–0	1–2	3–1	0–1
Railways FC			0–2	0–4		—		0–0	0–0	1–0
SAI Darjeeling		0–1	0–1	0–0	0–0		—	1–0		1–1
Southern Samity		0–0		3–1	2–1	0–0	0–1	—		0–0
Taltala Dipti Sangha		0–1	0–0		1–3	0–0			—	1–2
United					1–0	0–1	1–1	0–0	2–1	—

Updated to match(es) played on 9 September 2018. Source:
Legend: Blue = home team win; Yellow = draw; Red = away team win.
