= 2016–17 I-League =

10th season of the I-League

I-League
- Season: 2016–17
- Dates: 7 January - 30 April 2017
- Champions: Aizawl; 1st I-League title 1st Indian title
- Relegated: Mumbai
- AFC Champions League: Aizawl
- AFC Cup: Bengaluru
- Matches: 90
- Goals: 225 (2.5 per match)
- Top goalscorer: Aser Pierrick Dipanda (11 goals)
- Best goalkeeper: Debjit Majumder; Albino Gomes (8 clean sheets)
- Biggest home win: Bengaluru 7–0 DSK Shivajians (22 April 2017)
- Biggest away win: Minerva Punjab 0–5 East Bengal (29 January 2017)
- Highest scoring: Churchill Brothers 4–5 Minerva Punjab (19 February 2017)
- Longest winning run: East Bengal (6 games)
- Longest unbeaten run: East Bengal; Mohun Bagan (9 games)
- Longest winless run: Mumbai (16 games)
- Longest losing run: Mumbai (6 games)
- Highest attendance: 29,067; East Bengal vs Mohun Bagan (12 February 2017)
- Lowest attendance: 300; Minerva Punjab vs Chennai City (8 April 2017)
- Total attendance: 470,941
- Average attendance: 5,233

The 2016–17 I-League was the 10th season of the I-League, the top Indian professional league for association football clubs, since its establishment in 2007. The season began on 7 January 2017 and concluded on 30 April 2017.

Aizawl won their first title on the final day after securing a draw against Shillong Lajong on 30 April 2017. Defending champions Bengaluru finished in the fourth place. Dempo had entered the league after being promoted from the I-League 2nd Division but withdrew from the league along with Salgaocar and Sporting Goa. Aizawl were reinstated into the league after being relegated while Churchill Brothers, Chennai City, and Minerva Punjab were granted direct-entry into the I-League.

== Teams ==
Locations of the 2016–17 I-League teams

Ten teams are competing in the league. The majority of the teams from the previous season as well as recently promoted Dempo were originally supposed to compete this season. Dempo were promoted to the I-League on 30 May 2016, defeating Minerva Academy 3–1. Aizawl were relegated from the I-League the previous season, despite finishing above last place DSK Shivajians who were exempt from relegation. However, on 27 September 2016, the All India Football Federation (AIFF) announced that Aizawl would be reinstated into the I-League for the 2016–17 season.

Throughout the summer of 2016, the three Goan I-League clubs – Dempo, Salgaocar, and Sporting Goa – had been indecisive over their participation in the league. On 24 June 2016 it was first announced that Salgaocar and Sporting Goa would withdraw from the I-League following their displeasure over the proposed roadmap for Indian football for the 2017–18 season, with Dempo also threatening to do so next. However, in September 2015 it was revealed that despite withdrawing Sporting Goa and Dempo still submitted their AFC Licensing documents needed for I-League play. It was then revealed on 10 November that both Sporting Goa and Dempo were given national licenses for the I-League. Despite this though, however, on 22 November 2016 it was officially announced by Sporting Goa that they would withdraw from the I-League for good.

As well as dealing with the Goan clubs potential exit from the league, the AIFF have also worked on providing direct-entry for certain clubs into the I-League for this season. On 26 October 2016 it was revealed that both Minerva Academy and FC Bardez had submitted documents for direct-entry into the I-League. However, on 23 November, it was announced that the AIFF would be issuing new tenders for a direct-entry side in the league after none of the three sides which applied fulfilled the financial criteria.

On 8 December 2016, after Dempo confirmed their exit from the league, the AIFF reinstated Churchill Brothers into the I-League. Finally, on 11 December 2016, the AIFF granted direct-entry to both Chennai City and Minerva Punjab to bring the number of teams in the league to ten.

=== Stadiums and locations ===
Note: Table lists in alphabetical order.

Team	Location	Stadium	Capacity
Aizawl	Aizawl, Mizoram	Rajiv Gandhi Stadium	5,000
Bengaluru	Bangalore, Karnataka	Sree Kanteerava Stadium	24,000
Chennai City	Chennai, Tamil Nadu	Jawaharlal Nehru Stadium	40,000
Churchill Brothers	Vasco da Gama, Goa	Tilak Maidan Stadium	12,000
DSK Shivajians	Pune, Maharashtra	Balewadi Stadium	12,000
East Bengal	Kolkata, West Bengal	Barasat Stadium	22,000
Minerva Punjab	Ludhiana, Punjab	Guru Nanak Stadium	15,000
Mohun Bagan	Kolkata, West Bengal	Rabindra Sarobar Stadium	22,000
Mumbai	Mumbai, Maharashtra	Cooperage Ground	5,000
Shillong Lajong	Shillong, Meghalaya	Jawaharlal Nehru Stadium	30,000

=== Personnel and kits ===
Team	Head coach	Kit manufacturer	Shirt sponsor
Aizawl	(India) Khalid Jamil	Vamos	NE Consultancy Services
Bengaluru	(Spain) Albert Roca	Puma	JSW Group
Chennai City	(India) V Soundararajan	Classic Polo	Baako
Churchill Brothers	(India) Derrick Pereira	Strikke Sports	Churchill Group
DSK Shivajians	(England) Dave Rogers	Nivia	DSK Group
East Bengal	(India) Mridul Banerjee	Shiv Naresh	Kingfisher
Minerva Punjab	(India) Surinder Singh	T10 Sports	Indian Armed Forces
Mohun Bagan	(India) Sanjoy Sen	Shiv Naresh	None
Mumbai	(Spain) Oscar Bruzon	Nivia	Playwin
Shillong Lajong	(India) Thangboi Singto	Adidas	Gionee

=== Managerial changes ===
Team	Outgoing manager	Manner of departure	Date of vacancy	Position in table	Incoming manager	Date of appointment
Bengaluru	(England) Ashley Westwood	End of Contract	1 June 2016	Pre-season	(Spain) Albert Roca	6 July 2016
DSK Shivajians	(India) Derrick Pereira	Resigned	8 June 2016	Pre-season	(England) Dave Rogers	14 June 2016
Mumbai	(India) Khalid Jamil	Resigned	15 June 2016	Pre-season	(India) Santosh Kashyap	22 June 2016
Aizawl	(India) K. Malsawmkima	Assistant coach	20 December 2016	Pre-season	(India) Khalid Jamil	20 December 2016
Chennai City	(India) Robin Charles Raja	Sacked	7 February 2017	10th	(India) V Soundararajan	9 February 2017
Churchill Brothers	(India) Alfred Fernandes	Assistant coach	17 February 2017	10th	(India) Derrick Pereira	17 February 2017
Mumbai	(India) Santosh Kashyap	Sacked	18 March 2017	10th	(Spain) Óscar Bruzón	19 March 2017
East Bengal	(England) Trevor Morgan	Resigned	17 April 2017	3rd	(India) Mridul Banerjee	18 April 2017

=== Foreign players ===
A team can register up to four foreign players, of which one should compulsorily be a national of an Asian Country.

Club	Player 1	Player 2	Player 3	Asian Player
Aizawl	(Ivory Coast) Kamo Stephane Bayi	(Liberia) Alfred Jaryan	(Nigeria) Kingsley Obumneme	(Syria) Mahmoud Amnah
Bengaluru	(England) John Johnson	(Serbia) Marjan Jugović	(Spain) Juanan	(Australia) Cameron Watson
Chennai City	(Brazil) Charles	(Brazil) Marcos Thank	(Nigeria) Echezona Anyichie	
Churchill Brothers	(Liberia) Ansumana Kromah	(Trinidad and Tobago) Anthony Wolfe		(Kyrgyzstan) Bektur Talgat Uulu
DSK Shivajians	(Bosnia and Herzegovina) Saša Kolunija	(Republic of Ireland) Shane McFaul	(Spain) Juan Quero	(North Korea) Kim Song-yong
East Bengal	(Haiti) Wedson Anselme	(Trinidad and Tobago) Willis Plaza	(Uganda) Ivan Bukenya	(Australia) Chris Payne
Minerva Punjab	(Nigeria) Victor Amobi	(Nigeria) Loveday Enyinnaya	(Nigeria) Kareem Omolaja	(South Korea) Sang-Min Kim
Mohun Bagan	(Equatorial Guinea) Eduardo Ferreira	(Haiti) Sony Norde	(Scotland) Darryl Duffy	(Japan) Katsumi Yusa
Mumbai	(Trinidad and Tobago) Densill Theobald			(Afghanistan) Djelaludin Sharityar
Shillong Lajong	(Brazil) Fábio Pena	(Cameroon) Aser Pierrick Dipanda	(Romania) Dan Ignat	(Japan) Yuta Kinowaki

== Results ==
=== League table ===
Pos	Team	Pld	W	D	L	GF	GA	GD	Pts	Qualification or relegation
1	Aizawl (C)	18	11	4	3	24	14	+10	37	Qualification to Champions League qualifier
2	Mohun Bagan	18	10	6	2	27	12	+15	36	
3	East Bengal	18	10	3	5	33	15	+18	33	
4	Bengaluru	18	8	6	4	30	15	+15	30	Qualification to AFC Cup qualifying play-off (Note: Bengaluru qualified for the 2018 AFC Cup by winning the 2016–17 Federation Cup.)
5	Shillong Lajong	18	7	5	6	24	23	+1	26	
6	Churchill Brothers	18	5	5	8	24	26	−2	20	
7	DSK Shivajians	18	4	6	8	22	30	−8	18	
8	Chennai City	18	4	5	9	15	29	−14	17	
9	Minerva Punjab	18	2	7	9	17	33	−16	13 (Note: Minerva Punjab ahead of Mumbai on head-to-head record; Minerva Punjab–Mumbai 2–1, Mumbai–Minerva Punjab 0–0)	
10	Mumbai (R)	18	2	7	9	9	28	−19	13	Relegation to I-League 2nd Division

Source: IndiaFooty.com
Rules for classification: 1) points; 2) head-to-head points; 3) head-to-head goal difference; 4) goal difference; 5) number of goals scored; 6) drawing of lots
(C) Champions; (R) Relegated

=== Results table ===
Home \ Away	AFC	BFC	CCFC	CB	DSK	EB	MP	MB	MFC	SLFC
Aizawl		1–1	1–0	3–1	1–0	1–0	1–0	1–0	2–0	2–1
Bengaluru	1–0		2–0	3–0	7–0	1–3	1–1	0–0	3–0	3–0
Chennai City	2–0	1–1		1–1	1–1	2–1	0–0	1–2	2–1	1–4
Churchill Brothers	1–3	2–1	6–1		3–0	0–2	4–5	2–1	1–2	0–0
DSK Shivajians	0–1	2–2	2–0	1–1		1–2	4–4	0–0	5–0	2–3
East Bengal	1–1	2–1	3–0	1–2	0–1		3–1	0–0	2–0	1–1
Minerva Punjab	2–2	0–1	0–2	0–0	0–0	0–5		0–1	2–1	1–2
Mohun Bagan	3–2	3–0	2–1	1–0	3–1	2–1	4–0		2–2	2–0
Mumbai	0–1	0–0	0–0	0–0	1–0	0–4	0–0	0–0		1–1
Shillong Lajong	1–1	0–2	2–0	1–0	1–2	1–2	2–1	1–1	3–1	

Source: I-League
Legend: Blue = home team win; Yellow = draw; Red = away team win.

== Season statistics ==
As of 30 April 2017

=== Top scorers ===
Rank	Player	Club	Goals
1	(Cameroon) Aser Pierrick Dipanda	Shillong Lajong	11
2	(Trinidad and Tobago) Willis Plaza	East Bengal	9
3	(Haiti) Wedson Anselme	East Bengal	8
3	(Scotland) Darryl Duffy	Mohun Bagan	8
5	(India) Sunil Chhetri	Bengaluru	7
5	(India) C.K. Vineeth	Bengaluru	7
7	(Ivory Coast) Kamo Stephane Bayi	Aizawl FC	6
7	(Liberia) Ansumana Kromah	Churchill Brothers	6
9	(Kyrgyzstan) Bektur Talgat Uulu	Churchill Brothers	5
9	(India) Jeje Lalpekhlua	Mohun Bagan	5
9	(India) Robin Singh	East Bengal	5

=== Top Indian scorers ===
Rank	Player	Club	Goals
1	C.K. Vineeth	Bengaluru	7
1	Sunil Chettri	Bengaluru	7
3	Jeje Lalpekhlua	Mohun Bagan	5
3	Robin Singh	East Bengal	5
5	Holicharan Narzary	DSK Shivajians	4
5	Balwant Singh	Mohun Bagan	4
7	Karan Sawhney	Mumbai	3
7	Udanta Singh	Bengaluru	3
7	Chesterpoul Lyngdoh	Churchill Brothers	3
7	Brandon Vanlalremdika	Aizawl	3
7	Laldanmawia Ralte	Aizawl	3
7	Samuel Lalmuanpuia	Shillong Lajong	3
7	Brandon Fernandes	Churchill Brothers	3

=== Hat-tricks ===
Player	For	Against	Result	Date	Ref
(India) C.K. Vineeth	Bengaluru	Mumbai	3–0	18 January 2017	
(Haiti) Wedson Anselme	East Bengal	Minerva Punjab	5–0	29 January 2017	
(Kyrgyzstan) Bektur Talgat Uulu ^{4}	Churchill Brothers	Chennai City	6–1	22 April 2017	

^{4} Player scored 4 goals.

=== Fair play ===
Churchill Brothers led the fair play table at the end of the season.

Rank	Team	Total Points
1	Churchill Brothers	8.07
2	Chennai City	7.91
3	Shillong Lajong	7.79
4	Bengaluru	7.76
4	DSK Shivajians	7.76
6	Aizawl	7.74
7	East Bengal	7.73
8	Minerva Punjab	7.69
9	Mumbai	7.63
10	Mohun Bagan	7.49

== Attendance ==
As of 30 April 2017

=== Average home attendances ===
Team	GP	Cumulative	High	Low	Mean
East Bengal	9	88,537	29,067	2,351	9,726
Bengaluru	9	78,771	12,642	5,311	8,752
Mohun Bagan	9	71,199	23,859	3,256	7,911
Aizawl	9	62,488	11,000	4,725	6,943
Shillong Lajong	9	56,200	23,700	3,200	6,244
Chennai City	9	26,538	5,434	1,123	2,949
Minerva Punjab	9	24,814	5,169	300	2,757
Churchill Brothers	9	23,044	3,927	1,736	2,560
Mumbai	9	19,319	3,624	838	2,145
DSK Shivajians	9	10,051	1,547	648	1,118
Total	90	470,941	29,067	300	5,233

=== Highest attendances ===
Rank	Home team	Score	Away team	Attendance	Date	Stadium
1	East Bengal	0–0	Mohun Bagan	29,067	12 February 2017	Kanchenjunga Stadium
2	Mohun Bagan	2–1	East Bengal	23,859	9 April 2017	Kanchenjunga Stadium
3	Shillong Lajong	1–1	Aizawl	23,700	30 April 2017	JLN Stadium
4	East Bengal	1–1	Aizawl	12,700	7 January 2017	Barasat Stadium
5	Bengaluru	1–3	East Bengal	12,642	25 February 2017	Sree Kanteerava Stadium

== Awards ==
=== Hero of the Match ===
Round	Hero of the Matches				
1	(Nigeria) Kingsley Obumneme	(India) Udanta Singh	(India) Thoi Singh	(India) Kingsley Fernandes	(India) Karanjit Singh
2	(Syria) Mahmoud Amnah	(Scotland) Darryl Duffy	(Trinidad and Tobago) Willis Plaza	(India) Karanjit Singh	(India) Adil Khan
3	(Syria) Mahmoud Amnah	(India) Jeje Lalpekhlua	(India) Milan Singh	(India) Lalrindika Ralte	(India) C.K. Vineeth
4	(India) Rupert Nongrum	(India) Jerry Mawihmingthanga	(Brazil) Marcos Thank	(Uganda) Ivan Bukenya	(India) Jayesh Rane
5	(Bosnia and Herzegovina) Saša Kolunija	(India) Chesterpoul Lyngdoh	(Cameroon) Aser Pierrick Dipanda	(Brazil) Marcos Thank	(Haiti) Wedson Anselme
6	(Cameroon) Aser Pierrick Dipanda	(Liberia) Alfred Jaryan	(India) Rowilson Rodrigues	(Trinidad and Tobago) Willis Plaza	(Japan) Katsumi Yusa
7	(India) Anirudh Thapa	(India) Prabir Das	(India) Vishal Kaith	(Haiti) Wedson Anselme	(India) Holicharan Narzary
8	(Nigeria) Kingsley Obumneme	(Brazil) Charles	(Republic of Ireland) Shane McFaul	(India) Sunil Chhetri	(India) Rehenesh TP
9	(India) Brandon Fernandes	(India) Albino Gomes	(India) Laxmikant Kattimani	(India) Vishal Kaith	(India) Vinit Rai
10	(Trinidad and Tobago) Anthony Wolfe	(Cameroon) Aser Pierrick Dipanda	(Trinidad and Tobago) Densil Theobald	(India) Balwant Singh	(India) Laldanmawia Ralte
11	(India) Brandon Vanlalremdika	(India) Robin Singh	(Trinidad and Tobago) Anthony Wolfe	(India) Arnab Das Sharma	(India) Vishal Kaith
12	(Cameroon) Aser Pierrick Dipanda	(India) Chesterpoul Lyngdoh	(Ivory Coast) Kamo Stephane Bayi	(India) Lenny Rodrigues	(India) Nanda Kumar
13	(India) Nim Dorjee Tamang	(India) Laldanmawia Ralte	(India) Naveen Kumar	(India) Daniel Lalhlimpuia	(Haiti) Sony Norde
14	(Nigeria) Kareem Omolaja	(India) Holicharan Narzary	(India) Arindam Bhattacharya	(India) Vishal Kaith	(India) Karanjit Singh
15	(India) Michael Soosairaj	(India) Milan Singh	(India) Laxmikant Kattimani	(India) Jayesh Rane	(Haiti) Sony Norde
16	(Australia) Cameron Watson	(Ivory Coast) Kamo Stephane Bayi	(India) Krishna Pandit	(India) Jerry Mawihmingthanga	(India) Karanjit Singh
17	(India) Zohmingliana Ralte	(Kyrgyzstan) Bektur Talgat Uulu	(India) Sunil Chhetri	(India) Rowllin Borges	(India) Isaac Vanlalsawma
18	(India) Mandar Rao Desai	(India) Bikash Jairu	(North Korea) Kim Song-yong	(Ivory Coast) Kamo Stephane Bayi	(Haiti) Sony Norde

=== Season awards ===
Hero I-League 2016–17 awards were voted by coaches and captains of the participating teams.

Award	Recipient
Hero of the League	Sunil Chhetri (Bengaluru)
Best Goalkeeper	Debjit Majumder (Mohun Bagan)
Jarnail Singh Best Defender	Anas Edathodika (Mohun Bagan)
Best Midfielder	Alfred Jaryan (Aizawl)
Best Striker	Aser Pierrick Dipanda (Shillong Lajong)
Emerging Player	Jerry Lalrinzuala (DSK Shivajians)
Syed Abdul Rahim Best Coach	Khalid Jamil (Aizawl)
Best Organizers	DSK Shivajians; Bengaluru
Fairplay award	Churchill Brothers
Best referee	Pranjal Banerjee

== See also ==
- 2016–17 I-League 2nd Division
- 2016–17 Indian Women's League season
- 2016–17 Aizawl F.C. season
- 2016–17 Bengaluru FC season
- 2016–17 Mohun Bagan A.C. season
- 2016–17 East Bengal F.C. season
- 2016–17 Mumbai F.C. season
