= 2016–17 Mumbai FC season =

Indian football club season

Mumbai
2016–17 season
- Chairman: Amit Goenka
- Manager: Santosh Kashyap
- Stadium: Cooperage Ground, Mumbai, Maharashtra
- Top goalscorer: League: 3 Goals Karan Sawhney; All: 3 Goals Karan Sawhney
- Highest home attendance: 3624
- Lowest home attendance: 3126
Home colours	Away colours

The 2016–17 season was Mumbai F.C.'s eighth season in the I-League since its establishment in 2007. Mumbai were relegated to I-League 2nd division at the end of the season.

== Background ==
The club narrowly avoided relegation last season finishing with 19 from their 16 outings with four wins, seven draws and five losses. Following the disappointing campaign the club also parted company with former player and long-time head coach Khalid Jamil.

=== Transfers ===
Keepers Sanjiban Ghosh and Pawan Kumar(Mohun Bagan) headed for the exit. They are joined by defenders Srikanth Ramu, Thiyam Chingkheinganba and Ashutosh Mehta who has joined Aizawl FC. Midfielders Malemngamba Meetei (to NEROCA FC), Taisuke Matsugae, Eric Brown, Asif Kottayil, Darren Caldeira(to Bengaluru FC and later Chennai City FC and Arata Izumi ( NEROCA FC) have moved on. The frontline will also have a new look to it with the departures of Rohit Mirza, Ryuki Kozawa, Jayesh Rane and Cletus Paul.

==== In ====
No.	Position	Player	Previous club	Date	Ref
	FW	(India) Farukh Choudhary	Kerala Blasters		
	DF	(India) Reagan Singh	NorthEast United		
	DF	(India) Lalchhawnkima	Delhi Dynamos		
	DF	(India) Munmun Lugun	Mumbai City FC		
	FW	(India) Victorino Fernandes	Sporting Goa		
	FW	(India) Pratik Chowdhary	Kerala Blasters		
	FW	(India) Asheer Akhtar	Free Agent		
	FW	(India) Mehrajuddin Wadoo	Free agent		
	FW	(India) Chinta Chandrashekhar Rao	Free Agent		
	FW	(India) Laxmikant Kattimani	Dempo FC		
	FW	(India) Pratesh Shirodkar	FC Goa		
	FW	(India) Sukhdev Patil			
	FW	(India) Victorino Fernandes	Sporting Clube de Goa		
	FW	(India) Nikhil Kadam	DSK Shivajians		
	FW	(Brazil) Alex Willian	Free Agent		
	FW	(Brazil) Anderson Silva			
	FW	(Trinidad and Tobago) Densill Theobald			

== Competitions ==
=== Overall ===
Competition	Started round	Current position	Final position	First match	Last match
I-League	—	—	—	8 January 2017	—
Federation Cup	—	—	—	—	—

=== I-League ===
==== Matches ====
8 January 2017 Match 1	Mumbai	1–0	DSK Shivajians	Mumbai
19:00 IST	Singh 21'	Report		Stadium: Cooperage Ground; Attendance: 3,200

15 January 2017 Match 2	Churchill Brothers	v	Mumbai	Goa
16:30 IST		Report		Stadium: Tilak Maidan

==== Table ====
Pos	Team	Pld	W	D	L	GF	GA	GD	Pts	Qualification or relegation
6	Churchill Brothers	18	5	5	8	24	26	−2	20	
7	DSK Shivajians	18	4	6	8	22	30	−8	18	
8	Chennai City	18	4	5	9	15	29	−14	17	
9	Minerva Punjab	18	2	7	9	17	33	−16	13 (Note: Minerva Punjab ahead of Mumbai on head-to-head record; Minerva Punjab–Mumbai 2–1, Mumbai–Minerva Punjab 0–0)	
10	Mumbai (R)	18	2	7	9	9	28	−19	13	Relegation to I-League 2nd Division

Source: IndiaFooty.com
Rules for classification: 1) points; 2) head-to-head points; 3) head-to-head goal difference; 4) goal difference; 5) number of goals scored; 6) drawing of lots
(R) Relegated

==== Results summary ====
Overall								Home						Away					
Pld	W	D	L	GF	GA	GD	Pts	W	D	L	GF	GA	GD	W	D	L	GF	GA	GD
1	1	0	0	1	0	+1	3	1	0	0	1	0	+1	0	0	0	0	0	0

Last updated: 7 January 2017.
Source: soccerway

Round	1	2	3	4	5	6	7	8	9	10	11	12	13	14	15	16	17	18
Ground	H	A																
Result	W	W	L	L	L	L	L	L										
Position	3																	

Source: soccerway
A = Away; H = Home; W = Win; D = Draw; L = Loss

== See also ==
- 2016–17 in Indian football
