= V. Laltanpuia =

Indian footballer

V Laltanpuia
Personal information
- Full name: V Laltanpuia
- Date of birth: 20 September 1985 (age 41)
- Place of birth: Mizoram, India
- Position: Midfielder

Team information
- Current team: Aizawl (On loan from Mizoram Police)
- Number: 23

Senior career*
| Years | Team | Apps | (Gls) |
- United Sikkim
- Aizawl
| 2014– | Mizoram Police | | |
| 2017– | → Aizawl (loan) | 12 | (0) |
- * Club domestic league appearances and goals as of 30 April 2017

V Laltanpuia (born 20 September 1985) is an Indian professional footballer who plays as a midfielder for Aizawl in the I-League on loan from Mizoram Police.

== Career ==
Born in Mizoram, Laltanpuia has played for United Sikkim in the I-League 2nd Division before joining Aizawl for their second division campaign. After helping Aizawl gain promotion to the I-League he left the club to join Mizoram Police of the Mizoram Premier League. He captained the side in the league. While playing for Mizoram Police, Laltanpuia represented his state of Mizoram in the Santosh Trophy in 2012, 2013, 2014, and 2016. He was part of the Mizoram squad to win their first ever Santosh Trophy when they defeated Railways in the final 3–0.

=== Aizawl (loan) ===
On 31 December 2016, before the 2016–17 I-League season, it was announced that Laltanpuia would be loaned back to his old club, Aizawl, for the campaign. He made his debut back for the club on 4 February 2017 against Mohun Bagan. He started the match and played 79 minutes as Aizawl were defeated 3–2.

== Career statistics ==
As of 30 April 2017

| Club | Season | League | | | League Cup | | Domestic Cup | | Continental | | Total | |
| Club | Season | Division | Apps | Goals | Apps | Goals | Apps | Goals | Apps | Goals | Apps | Goals |
|---|---|---|---|---|---|---|---|---|---|---|---|---|
| Aizawl | 2016–17 | I-League | 12 | 0 | — | — | 0 | 0 | — | — | 12 | 0 |
| Career total | | | 12 | 0 | 0 | 0 | 0 | 0 | 0 | 0 | 12 | 0 |
