= Marcos Thank =

Brazilian footballer

Personal information
- Full name: Marcos Vinícius Costa Guedes
- Date of birth: 16 December 1992 (age 33)
- Place of birth: Brazil
- Position: Striker

Team information
- Current team: Chennai City FC
- Number: 10

Senior career*
Years	Team	Apps	(Gls)
2011–2013	–		
2014	–		
2015	–		
2016	GDSC Alvarenga		
2017–	Chennai City FC	4	(2)
- * Club domestic league appearances and goals as of 8 January 2017

Marcos Vinícius Costa Guedes (born 16 December 1992), better known as Marcos Thank, is a Brazilian footballer who was signed for I-league club Chennai City FC.

== Club career ==
=== Chennai City ===
In December 2016, Thank was signed by new I-League entrant, Chennai City F.C. He made his debut against Minerva Punjab, when he was substituted on 82nd minute. He scored his first goal for the club on 21 January 2017 in a home game against Mohun Bagan and also became the club's first ever goalscorer.

== Career statistics ==
As of 8 January 2017

Club	Season	League			League Cup		Domestic Cup		Continental		Total	
Club	Season	Division	Apps	Goals	Apps	Goals	Apps	Goals	Apps	Goals	Apps	Goals
Chennai City	2016–17	I-League	3	1	—	—	0	0	—	—	1	0
Career total			1	0	0	0	0	0	0	0	1	0
