= Zohmingliana Ralte =

Indian footballer (born 1990)

Zotea Ralte
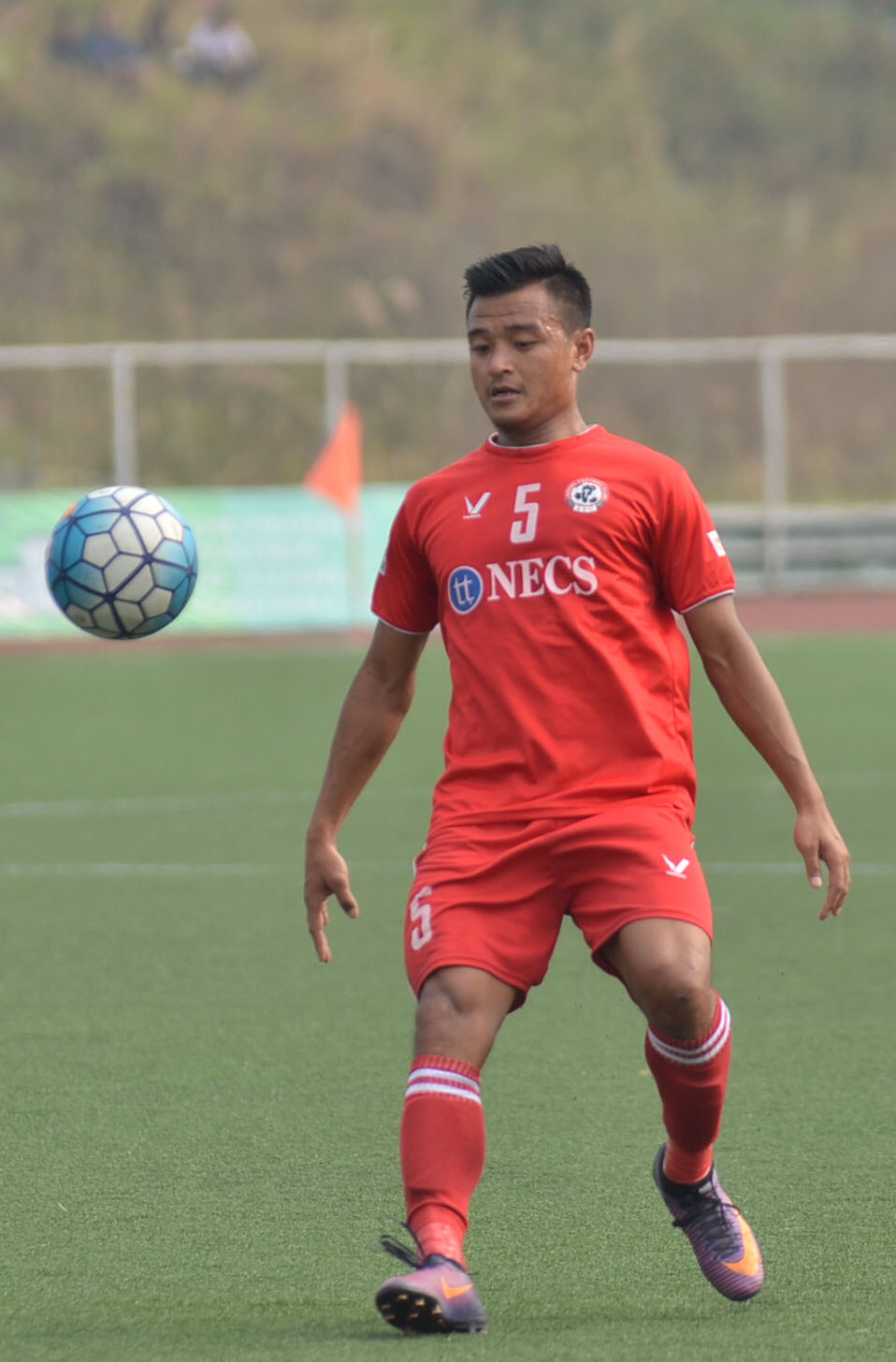

Personal information
- Full name: Zohmingliana Ralte
- Date of birth: 2 October 1990 (age 36)
- Place of birth: Aizawl, Mizoram
- Height: 1.78 m (5 ft 10 in)
- Position: Defender

Youth career
- 2005–2006: Mohun Bagan
- 2007–2008: Rangdajied United
- 2008–2009: Shillong Lajong

Senior career*
Years	Team	Apps	(Gls)
2009–2012	Shillong Lajong		
2012–2015	Pune	27	(1)
2015	→ NorthEast United FC (loan)	2	(0)
2016	DSK Shivajians	12	(0)
2017	Aizawl	18	(1)
2017−2018	Bengaluru	0	(0)
2018–2021	Chennaiyin	3	(0)
- * Club domestic league appearances and goals

Zohmingliana Ralte (born 2 October 1990), commonly known by his nickname Zotea, is an Indian professional footballer who last played as a defender for Chennaiyin FC in the Indian Super League.

== Career ==
=== Early career ===
Born in Aizawl, Mizoram, Ralte began his career at the academy of Mohun Bagan in 2005 before leaving the academy after one year due to being homesick. He then joined the Rangdajied United youth team in 2007 before joining Shillong Lajong in 2008. While with Shillong Lajong Ralte played in the I-League and I-League 2nd Division.

=== Pune ===
On 30 July 2012 it was announced that Ralte had signed with Pune F.C. of the I-League on a two-year deal. He made his league debut for Pune on 5 January 2013 against United Sikkim when he came on as a 92nd-minute substitute for James Moga. Ralte scored his first ever professional goal on 24 May 2015 as he headed in Arata Izumi's deflected corner in the sixth minute, in what proved to be the only goal in a 1–0 victory over his former club Shillong Lajong.

=== NorthEast United FC ===
In July 2015 Ralte was drafted to play for NorthEast United FC in the 2015 Indian Super League.

=== DSK Shivajians ===
Ralte signed for DSK Shivajians for one season.

=== Aizawl FC ===
In December 2016, Ralte signed for his home side Aizawl F.C. for 2016-17 I-League season. He was the captain of Aizawl and guided them to lift the maiden I-League trophy. Ralte scored a crucial goal against Mohun Bagan which was known to be the title winning goal of the season.

=== Bengaluru FC ===
On July 23, 2017, Ralte was drafted to Bengaluru FC.

== Honours ==
=== Club ===
Aizawl FC

- I-League(1): 2016–17
