= Yuta Kinowaki =

Japanese footballer

Personal information
- Date of birth: 22 January 1991 (age 35)
- Place of birth: Japan
- Height: 1.78 m (5 ft 10 in)
- Position: Midfielder

Youth career
- Kyoto Sanga

Senior career*
Years	Team	Apps	(Gls)
2013–2014	Energetyk Gryfino	15	(0)
2014	Daugavpils	21	(0)
2015	Kyoto Sanga	3	(1)
2015–2016	Aizawl	15	(2)
2016−2017	Shillong Lajong	18	(2)
2017−2019	Mohun Bagan	20	(1)
Total		92	(6)
- * Club domestic league appearances and goals

Yuta Kinowaki (木脇 悠太, Kinowaki Yūta; born 22 January 1991) is a Japanese former professional footballer who played as a midfielder.

== Career ==
Kinowaki, after spending his youth with Kyoto Sanga, moved to Poland to play with Energetyk Gryfino. After a season in Poland, Kinowaki moved to Latvia to play for Virslīga side BFC Daugavpils. After a season with Daugavpils, Kinowaki moved to India and signed for newly promoted I-League club, Aizawl.

Kinowaki made his debut for Aizawl in the I-League on 9 January 2016 against the reigning champions, Mohun Bagan. He played the full match as Aizawl lost 3–1. After missing a home game against Bengaluru, he scored a goal against DSK Shivaijans, his first goal for Aizawl.

In August 2017 he joined Mohun Bagan as their second Asian player. On 4 December 2017, Kinowaki made his debut for Mohun Bagan against arch-rivals East Bengal in the I-league. He suffered a shoulder injury in his second match against Churchill Brothers and eventually had to leave the stadium in an ambulance. He was ruled out for a month after dislocating a collarbone.

== Statistics ==
As of 30 April 2017

Club	Season	League			League Cup		Domestic Cup		International		Total	
Club	Season	Division	Apps	Goals	Apps	Goals	Apps	Goals	Apps	Goals	Apps	Goals
BFC Daugavpils	2014	Latvian Higher League	21	0	—	—	0	0	—	—	21	0
Kyoto Shiko S.C.	2015	KSL2	3	1	—	—	—	—	—	—	3	1
Aizawl	2015–16	I-League	15	2	—	—	5	0	—	—	20	2
Shillong Lajong	2016–17	I-League	18	2	—	—	3	2	—	—	21	5
Mohun Bagan	2017-18	I-League	2	0	-	-	-	-	-	-		
Career total			57	4	0	0	8	2	0	0	65	8

== Honours ==
Mohun Bagan

- Calcutta Football League: 2018–19
