= Do Dong-hyun =

South Korean footballer (born 1993)

Personal information
- Full name: Do Dong-hyun
- Date of birth: 20 November 1993 (age 32)
- Place of birth: South Korea
- Height: 1.73 m (5 ft 8 in)
- Positions: Left winger; attacking midfielder

Team information
- Current team: Melaka
- Number: 88

Youth career
- 2006–2012: Gyeongnam

Senior career*
Years	Team	Apps	(Gls)
2012–2013	Brisbane Roar	32	(4)
2013–2014	FC Gifu	38	(6)
2014–2015	NorthEast United	18	(2)
2015–2016	East Bengal	38	(20)
2016–2017	UiTM	28	(14)
2017–2018	Kelantan	24	(4)
2018–2019	Terengganu II	32	(12)
2019–2025	Gyeongnam	124	(28)
2022–2023	→ Jinju Citizen (loan)	24	(6)
2026–	Melaka	2	(0)

International career^{‡}
2011–2013	South Korea U20	6	(4)
- * Club domestic league appearances and goals as of 7 January 2026 ‡ National team caps and goals as of 1 November 2011

- Korean name
- Hangul: 도동현
- RR: Do Donghyeon
- MR: To Tonghyŏn

Do Dong-hyun (Korean: 도동현; [to.doŋ.çʌn]; born 20 November 1993) is a South Korean professional footballer who plays mainly as left winger but can also play as an attacking midfielder.

== Club career ==
=== Brisbane Roar ===
Do signed a three-year deal with Australian A-League club Brisbane Roar on 17 July 2012, making him the youngest player to occupy a Visa spot in the A-League. He never made as a club starter during his season debut and only made 3 appearances as a substitute. For some bitter reason, Do could not continue with the side and was released from the club in July 2013.

=== FC Gifu ===
On 17 July 2013, Do signed for J2 League team FC Gifu, where he made 5 appearances for the team.

=== NorthEast United ===
Dong-Hyun was drafted by NorthEast United in the Inaugural Indian Super League draft on 21 August 2014.

=== East Bengal ===
On 27 June 2015, Do signed a one-year contract with an I-League Kolkata based club East Bengal for the 2015–16 I-League season. The club is under newly appointed East Bengal coach Biswajit Bhattacharya.

Do started the season in the 2015 Calcutta Football League where he scored 12 goals in 10 appearances, helping his team to clinch the title, including a brace in the 4–0 derby win over Mohun Bagan where he scored 2 goals both from a free kick.

He made his I-League debut for East Bengal on 10 January 2016 and recorded an assist in East Bengal's 3–1 win over Sporting Club de Goa. He also played an important role in the return league of 2015–16 I-League in the match against arch rivals Mohun Bagan as he scored two goals one from a spot-kick and the other one by dancing past two defenders at Kanchenjunga Stadium of Siliguri.

On 17 November 2016 it was announced that Do had been released by East Bengal after failing to impress head coach Trevor Morgan.

=== UiTM ===
On 11 January 2017, Do signed a one-year contract with Malaysian Liga Premier side UiTM. He made his Liga Premier debut in a 1–1 draw against Kuala Lumpur on 3 February 2017. Do made 29 appearances and 16 goals during his debut season with UiTM. On 24 November 2017, Do had already been offered a contract extension to stay with the club but he has refused.

=== Kelantan ===
On 23 November 2017, Do signed a two-year contract with the Malaysian Malaysia Super League side Kelantan. Do made his league debut for Kelantan in 2–1 defeat to Melaka United on 3 February 2018. On 6 February 2018, Do scored his first goal for Kelantan in a 1–1 draw against Terengganu. Do scored a hat trick in 3–2 win over Perak on 24 February 2018 at Sultan Muhammad IV Stadium.

=== Terengganu ===
After being frozen out of the Kelantan first team as a result of new head coach Fajr Ibrahim reshuffling of the team, Do signed with rivals Terengganu F.C. II until the end of the 2018 season.

=== Gyeongnam FC ===
In 2019, Dong-hyun joined K League 1 side Gyeongnam FC.

=== Jinju Citizen FC ===
In 2022 season, he joined K4 League side Jinju Citizen FC for his military service as a social service agent.

== International career ==
Do made 2 appearances for South Korea U20 in 2012 AFC U-19 Championship qualification. His debut was in 1–0 defeat against Thailand U20 on 31 October 2011. Do scored a hat trick in an 18–0 win over Guam U20 on 2 November 2011.

== Career statistics ==
=== Club ===
As of match played 27 June 2018.

Appearances and goals by club, season and competition
Club	Season	League			Cup (Note: Appearances and goals in Calcutta Football League with East Bengal)		League Cup (Note: Appearances and goals in Malaysia Cup with UiTM and Kelantan)		Continental		Total	
Club	Season	Division	Apps	Goals	Apps	Goals	Apps	Goals	Apps	Goals	Apps	Goals
Brisbane Roar	2012–13	A-League	3	0	0	0	0	0	–		3	0
Brisbane Roar	Total		3	0	0	0	0	0	–		3	0
FC Gifu	2013	J2 League	2	0	0	0	0	0	–		2	0
FC Gifu	2014	J2 League	3	0	0	0	0	0	–		3	0
FC Gifu	Total		5	0	0	0	0	0	–		5	0
NorthEast United	2014	Indian Super League	8	0	0	0	0	0	–		8	0
NorthEast United	Total		8	0	0	0	0	0	–		8	0
East Bengal	2015–16	CFL Premier A	10	12	-	-	-	-	-		10	12
East Bengal	2015–16	I-League	13	3	2	1	0	0	–		15	4
East Bengal	2016	CFL Premier A	9	4	-	-	0	0	–		9	4
East Bengal	Total		32	19	2	1	0	0	–		34	20
UiTM	2017	Malaysia Premier League	22	13	2	1	5	2	–		29	16
UiTM	Total		22	13	2	1	5	2	–		29	16
Kelantan	2018	Malaysia Super League	6	4	1	0	0	0	–		7	4
Kelantan	Total		6	4	1	0	0	0	–		7	4
Terengganu	2018	Malaysia Super League	4	0	0	0	0	0	–		4	0
Terengganu	Total		4	0	0	0	0	0	–		4	0
Career Total			80	36	23	17	5	2	–	–	108	55

== Honours ==
Individual

- East Bengal "Player of the Season Award": 2016
