= Bijaya Dhimal =

Nepalese footballer

Bijay Dhimal
Personal information
- Full name: Bijay Dhimal
- Date of birth: 4 October 1986 (age 40)
- Height: 5 ft 7 in (1.70 m)
- Position: Defender

Team information
- Current team: Three Star Club
- Number: 5

Senior career*
Years	Team	Apps	(Gls)
2004–2005	Machhindra F.C.		
2005–2009	Jawalakhel Youth Club		
2009–2019	Three Star Club		

International career
2013–2016	Nepal National Team		(0)
- * Club domestic league appearances and goals

Bijay Dhimal (Nepali: बिजय धिमाल; born 4 October 1986) is a defender playing for Three Star Club in Martyr's Memorial A-Division League.

== Domestic career ==
In domestic league Dhimal played for Machhindra F.C., Jawalakhel Youth Club and Three Star Club.

== International career ==
Dhimal was a hardworking and a successful Martyr's Memorial A-Division League player resulting in his being called up to the national team ni 2013. His debut match was at the 2013 AFC Challenge Cup qualification. He also played friendly matches against Bahrain national football team and Kuwait national football team on 2013.
