= Bektur Talgat Uulu =

Kyrgyz footballer

Bektur Talgat
Personal information
- Full name: Bektur Talgat Uulu
- Date of birth: 9 September 1994 (age 32)
- Place of birth: Bishkek, Kyrgyzstan
- Height: 1.78 m (5 ft 10 in)
- Position: Defensive midfielder

Team information
- Current team: RANS Nusantara
- Number: 14

Youth career
- Abdysh-Ata Kant
- 2014: Astana 1964

Senior career*
Years	Team	Apps	(Gls)
2014–2016	Abdysh-Ata Kant		
2016	Alga Bishkek		
2017	Churchill Brothers	16	(4)
2017–2018	Sur	8	(0)
2018	Churchill Brothers	10	(0)
2018	Aizawl	5	(0)
2019	Alga Bishkek	1	(0)
2019–2020	United Victory	6	(0)
2020–2021	Alga Bishkek	19	(1)
2021–2022	PSM Makassar	7	(0)
2022–2023	NEROCA	0	(0)
2024	FC Alay Osh	0	(0)
2024–	RANS Nusantara	9	(0)

International career^{‡}
2014–2016	Kyrgyzstan U21	6	(0)
- * Club domestic league appearances and goals as of 25 February 2025 ‡ National team caps and goals as of 18 January 2017

Bektur Talgat Uulu (born 9 September 1994) is a Kyrgyz professional footballer who plays as a midfielder for Liga 2 club RANS Nusantara.

== Club career ==
In January 2017, Uulu signed for Churchill Brothers.

Uulu made his professional debut in India, playing for Churchill Brothers in the I-League against East Bengal. He came on as a halftime substitute for Kingsley Fernandes but could not prevent his side from losing 2–0. On 22 April 2017 he scored four goals in a match against Chennai City.

In August 2017, Uulu signed a one-year contract with Sur of the Oman First Division League.

In January 2018 he returned to Churchill Brothers. He played a total of 10 matches in the 2017–18 I-League season. Later he was included in Churchill's squad for remaining matches of Goa Professional League. He scored his first goal of the 2017–18 season in a 10–0 win against FC Bardez.

In October 2018, he joined Aizawl FC.

=== NEROCA ===
In August 2022, Uulu returned to India after three years with I-League club NEROCA. On 18 August, he made his debut for the club in the Imphal Derby against TRAU in the Durand Cup, which ended in a 3–1 win.

== International career ==
He was called 2 times for the Kyrgyzstan national football team. But as of January 2019, he hasn't played in any official matches.

== Career statistics ==
=== Club ===
As of 25 February 2025

Club	Season	League			Cup		Continental		Total	
Club	Season	Division	Apps	Goals	Apps	Goals	Apps	Goals	Apps	Goals
Churchill Brothers	2016–17	I-League	16	4	3 (Note: Appearance(s) in Federation Cup)	0	—		19	4
Churchill Brothers	2017–18	I-League	10	0	2 (Note: Appearance(s) in Super Cup)	0	—		12	0
Churchill Brothers	Churchill Brothers total		26	4	5	0	0	0	31	4
Aizawl	2018–19	I-League	5	0	0	0	—		5	0
Alga Bishkek	2019	Kyrgyz Premier League	1	0	0	0	—		1	0
Alga Bishkek	2020	Kyrgyz Premier League	9	1	1 (Note: Appearance(s) in Kyrgyzstan Cup)	0	—		10	1
Alga Bishkek	2021	Kyrgyz Premier League	10	0	2	0	—		12	0
Alga Bishkek	Alga Bishkek total		20	1	3	0	0	0	23	1
PSM Makassar	2021–22	Liga 1	7	0	0	0	—		7	0
NEROCA	2022–23	I-League	0	0	2 (Note: Appearance(s) in Durand Cup)	0	—		2	0
RANS Nusantara	2024–25	Liga 2	9	0	0	0	—		9	0
Career total			67	5	10	0	0	0	77	5
