= 2016–17 in Indian football =

Football in India
- Season: 2016–17

Men's football
- I-League: Aizawl
- I-League 2nd Div.: NEROCA
- Federation Cup: Bengaluru

Women's football
- IWL: Eastern Sporting Union

The 2016–17 season is the 129th competitive association football season in India.

== Promotion and relegation ==
League	Promoted to	Relegated from
Indian Super League	No promotion/relegation	
I-League	Dempo (Note: Dempo were promoted but withdrew from 2016–17 I-League)	
I-League 2nd Division	Based on invitation	

== Indian Super League ==
Atlético de Kolkata won the title second time after defeating the Kerala Blasters in a penalty shootout, 4–3, during the final. The match had ended 1–1 after ninety minutes and extra time.

Pos	Team	Pld	W	D	L	GF	GA	GD	Pts	Qualification
1	Mumbai City	14	6	5	3	16	8	+8	23	Advance to ISL Play-offs
2	Kerala Blasters	14	6	4	4	12	14	−2	22	Advance to ISL Play-offs
3	Delhi Dynamos	14	5	6	3	27	17	+10	21	Advance to ISL Play-offs
4	Atlético de Kolkata (C)	14	4	8	2	16	14	+2	20	Advance to ISL Play-offs
5	NorthEast United	14	5	3	6	14	14	0	18	
6	Pune City	14	4	4	6	13	16	−3	16	
7	Chennaiyin	14	3	6	5	20	25	−5	15	
8	Goa	14	4	2	8	15	25	−10	14	

Source: Indian Super League
Rules for classification: 1) points; 2) head-to-head points; 3) head-to-head goal difference; 4) goal difference; 5) number of goals scored; 6) play-off match
(C) Champions

=== Finals ===
Semi-Finals
1	Mumbai City	2	0	2
4	Atlético de Kolkata	3	0	3
2	Kerala Blasters	1	1	2 (3)
3	Delhi Dynamos	0	2	2 (0)

Final
4	Atlético de Kolkata	1 (4)
2	Kerala Blasters	1 (3)

== I-League ==
Pos	Team	Pld	W	D	L	GF	GA	GD	Pts	Qualification or relegation
1	Aizawl (C)	18	11	4	3	24	14	+10	37	Qualification to Champions League qualifier
2	Mohun Bagan	18	10	6	2	27	12	+15	36	
3	East Bengal	18	10	3	5	33	15	+18	33	
4	Bengaluru	18	8	6	4	30	15	+15	30	Qualification to AFC Cup qualifying play-off (Note: Bengaluru qualified for the 2018 AFC Cup by winning the 2016–17 Federation Cup.)
5	Shillong Lajong	18	7	5	6	24	23	+1	26	
6	Churchill Brothers	18	5	5	8	24	26	−2	20	
7	DSK Shivajians	18	4	6	8	22	30	−8	18	
8	Chennai City	18	4	5	9	15	29	−14	17	
9	Minerva Punjab	18	2	7	9	17	33	−16	13 (Note: Minerva Punjab ahead of Mumbai on head-to-head record; Minerva Punjab–Mumbai 2–1, Mumbai–Minerva Punjab 0–0)	
10	Mumbai (R)	18	2	7	9	9	28	−19	13	Relegation to I-League 2nd Division

Source: IndiaFooty.com
Rules for classification: 1) points; 2) head-to-head points; 3) head-to-head goal difference; 4) goal difference; 5) number of goals scored; 6) drawing of lots
(C) Champions; (R) Relegated

=== Head coaching changes ===
Team	Outgoing coach	Manner of departure	Date of vacancy	Position in table	Incoming coach	Date of appointment
Indian Super League
Mumbai City	(France) Nicolas Anelka	Contract finished	20 December 2015	Pre-season	(Costa Rica) Alexandre Guimarães	19 April 2016
Pune City	(England) David Platt	Contract finished	20 December 2015	Pre-season	(Spain) Antonio López Habas	25 April 2016
Atlético de Kolkata	(Spain) Antonio López Habas	Contract finished	20 December 2015	Pre-season	(Spain) José Francisco Molina	5 May 2016
NorthEast United	(Venezuela) César Farías	Contract finished	20 December 2015	Pre-season	(Brazil) Sérgio Farias	13 May 2016
Kerala Blasters	(Republic of Ireland) Terry Phelan	Contract finished	20 December 2015	Pre-season	(England) Steve Coppell	21 June 2016
Delhi Dynamos	(Brazil) Roberto Carlos	Contract finished	20 December 2015	Pre-season	(Italy) Gianluca Zambrotta	5 July 2016
NorthEast United	(Brazil) Sérgio Farias	Moved to Suphanburi	9 July 2016	Pre-season	(Portugal) Nelo Vingada	16 July 2016
I-League
Bengaluru FC	(England) Ashley Westwood	End of Contract	1 June 2016	Pre-season	(Spain) Albert Roca	6 July 2016
DSK Shivajians	(India) Derrick Pereira	Resigned	8 June 2016	Pre-season	(England) Dave Rogers	14 June 2016
Mumbai	(India) Khalid Jamil	Resigned	15 June 2016	Pre-season	(India) Santosh Kashyap	22 June 2016
Aizawl	(India) K. Malsawmkima	Assistant coach	20 December 2016	Pre-season	(India) Khalid Jamil	20 December 2016
Chennai City	(India) Robin Charles Raja	Sacked	7 February 2017	10th	(India) V Soundararajan	9 February 2017
Churchill Brothers	(India) Alfred Fernandes	Assistant coach	17 February 2017	10th	(India) Derrick Pereira	17 February 2017
Mumbai	(India) Santosh Kashyap	Sacked	18 March 2017	10th	(Spain) Óscar Bruzón	19 March 2017
East Bengal	(England) Trevor Morgan	Resigned	17 April 2017	3rd	(India) Mridul Banerjee	18 April 2017
