= Robin Charles Raja =

Indian footballer and coach

Personal information
- Date of birth: 30 July 1966 (age 60)
- Place of birth: Tamil Nadu, India

Managerial career
- Years: Team
- Chennai Customs
- Hindustan Eagles
- Chennai
- Tamil Nadu
- 2016–2017: Chennai City
- 2017–: Chennai F.C.

Robin Charles Raja (born 30 July 1966) is an Indian football manager and a former player. He is the coach of Chennai FC, which competes in the CFA Senior Division league.

== Coaching career ==
Born in Tamil Nadu, Raja has served as the head coach of various local state clubs in the CFA Senior Division. He won the league with both Chennai Customs and Hindustan Eagles in 2010 and 2012 respectively. He also coached Chennai FC in the league in 2016. Raja has also coached Tamil Nadu in the Santosh Trophy. During the 2016 edition of the tournament, Raja lead his state side to the semi-finals of the tournament. His side lost 1–0.

=== Chennai City ===
Raja was named the head coach of Chennai City in December 2016 after the club were granted direct-entry into the I-League. He was sacked in January 2017 after "due to unsatisfactory results" with the team lying on the bottom of the table then, following just one win after the first seven games.

== Statistics ==
=== Managerial statistics ===
As of 8 February 2017.

| Team | From | To | Record | | | | |
| Team | From | To | G | W | D | L | Win % |
|---|---|---|---|---|---|---|---|
| Chennai City | 13 December 2016 | 8 February 2017 | 7 | 1 | 1 | 5 | 14.29 |
| Total | | | 7 | 1 | 1 | 5 | 14.29 |

=== Personal life ===
Robin Charles Raja is married to Angela Lincy Vasanthakumari. His wife is also a sportsperson. She won the high jump for women and set a national record of 1.72m, at the National Games in Thiruvananthapuram, Kerala, in the year 1987. She was 15 years old when she set this record. Angela Lincy is from Nazareth, Tamil Nadu. Also, she is an alumna of St. Johns Girls Higher Secondary School, Nazareth. They have a daughter, who is also a sportsperson, her name is Abhisheka Shannon, she is a squash player and she is a national champion at the junior level.
