= V. Soundararajan =

Indian footballer and manager

Personal information
- Position: Midfielder

Managerial career
- Years: Team
- 2017–2018: Chennai City

V Soundararajan is an Indian association football manager and former player, who last managed I-League club Chennai City FC.

== Playing career ==
Soundarajan played for Tamil Nadu football team and Railways football team as a midfielder.

== Coaching career ==
Soundararajan is an AFC Professional coaching licence holder. He began his coaching career with India national under-19 football team in 2006. In 2017, Soundararajan was appointed the manager of I-League debutant Chennai City F.C.
