= Oluwaunmi Somide =

Nigerian footballer (born 1991)

Oluwawunmi Somide
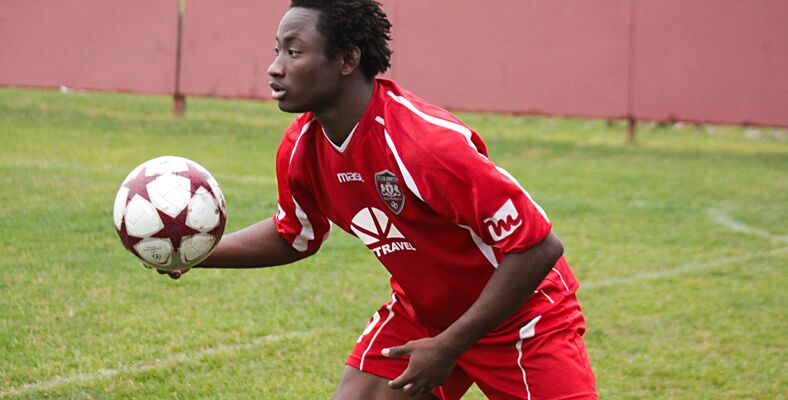

Personal information
- Full name: Oluwawunmi Somide Adelaja
- Date of birth: 16 May 1991 (age 35)
- Place of birth: Abeokuta, Nigeria
- Height: 1.70 m (5 ft 7 in)
- Position: Striker

Youth career
- 2005–2007: Pepsi Football Academy
- 2007–2008: Ebedei

Senior career*
Years	Team	Apps	(Gls)
2008–2012	FC Olimpia Bălţi	74	(34)
2013–2014	United Sikkim	15	(9)
2014	Mohammedan	27	(15)
2015	Tollygunge Agragami	11	(4)
2015	Guwahati FC (Loan)	7	(5)
2016	East Bengal	12	(6)
2017	Chennai City	0	(0)
2017	Gokulam Kerala	14	(3)
2018–2019	Manang Marshyangdi Club	17	(8)
2019–2020	Macchindra Club	11	(6)
2021	Biratnagar City	6	(2)
- * Club domestic league appearances and goals

Oluwawunmi Somide Adelaja (born 16 May 1991) is a Nigerian professional footballer who plays as a forward.

== Career ==
=== Nigeria ===
Somide began his professional footballing career in 2005 with Nigerian club Pepsi Football Academy. In 2007, he moved to Ebedei, with whom he played till 2008.

=== Moldova ===
He first moved out of Nigeria in 2008 to Moldova, where he signed a long-term contract with FC Olimpia Bălţi. He made his Moldovan National Division debut on 28 May 2008 in a 1–0 win against Sheriff Tiraspol and scored his first goal in that match. He made 74 appearances and 34 goals from 2008 till 2012 in the Moldovan National Division 1.

=== India ===
In 2013, he moved to India, where he signed a short-term contract with Jwalandeep United Sikkim F.C.. He made his Durand Cup debut on 14 September 2013 in a 3–1 victory against Assam Regiment centre, and he scored 2 goals in that match. In 2014, he signed a one-year contract with Mohammedan S.C. in the I-League 2nd division and he made his debut in a 2–0 victory against United SC. In 2015, he signed a six-month contract with Guwahati F.C. In 2016, he signed a four-month contract with East Bengal in the Calcutta Football League. His debut was against Peerless S.C. His team won the match 2–0. He also helped his club win the Calcutta football League cup 2015–16.

=== Nepal ===
Oluwawunmi Somide Adelaja joined Biratnagar City for the inaugural season of Nepal Super League 2021. He scored 5 goals in 6 games.

== Honours ==
Gokulam Kerala

- AWES Cup runner-up: 2017
