= Bright Middleton Mends =

Ghanaian footballer

Bright Mends
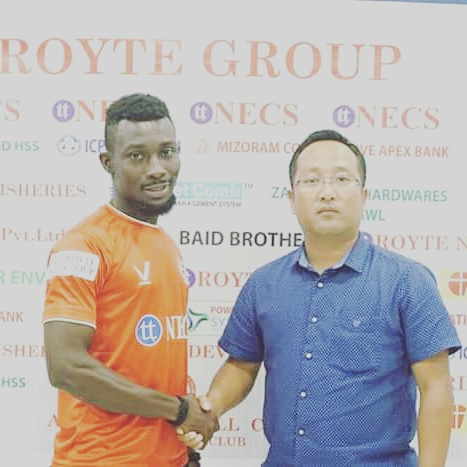

Personal information
- Full name: Bright Middleton Mends
- Date of birth: 24 November 1992 (age 33)
- Height: 5 ft 8 in (1.73 m)
- Position: Forward

Senior career*
Years	Team	Apps	(Gls)
2007–2009	Hawas Football Club	40	(23)
2009–2010	Welfare Stars Football Club	18	(11)
2010–2014	New Edubiase United	45	(18)
2016	Aizawl F.C.	30	(16)
2017	Gokulam Kerala F.C.	6	(4)
2018	Pathachakra F.C.	7	(6)
2019	BSS Sporting Club	11	(5)
2020	United SC		
- * Club domestic league appearances and goals

Bright Middleton Mends is a Ghanaian football player who last played as a forward for United SC. He was awarded the most promising player for New Edubiase United in the Ghana Premier League. He later moved on to sign for Aizawl F.C. in 2016.
