= List of 2019–20 I-League season roster changes =

This is a list of all roster changes that occurred prior to the 2019–20 season.

== Player movement and other transactions ==
=== Team changes ===
Date	Name	Previous club	New club	Transfer Type
25 March 2019	(India) Samuel Lalmuanpuia	(India) Shillong Lajong	(India) Punjab	Loan
27 March 2019	(Trinidad and Tobago) Robert Primus	(Belarus) Slutsk	(India) Churchill Brothers	Free
29 March 2019	(Nigeria) Kareem Omolaja	(India) Aizawl	(India) Punjab	Loan
31 May 2019	(India) Yami Longvah	(India) TRAU	(India) East Bengal	Loan Return
31 May 2019	(India) Mehtab Singh	(India) Gokulam Kerala	(India) East Bengal	Loan Return
31 May 2019	(Italy) Mauro Boerchio	(India) Chennai City	(India) NEROCA	Loan Return
31 May 2019	(India) Hitova Ayemi	(India) Fateh Hyderabad	(India) Punjab	Loan Return
31 May 2019	(India) Deepak K	(India) Gokulam Kerala	(India) East Bengal	Loan Return
31 May 2019	(India) V.P. Suhair	(India) Gokulam Kerala	(India) East Bengal	Loan Return
9 June 2019	(Japan) Katsumi Yusa	(India) NEROCA	(India) Chennai City	Free
9 June 2019	(Cameroon) Aser Pierrick Dipanda	(India) Mohun Bagan	(India) Southern Samity	Free
9 June 2019	(India) Naorem Tondomba Singh	(India) NEROCA	(India) East Bengal	Free
9 June 2019	(India) Dhanachandra Singh	(India) Jamshedpur	(India) Mohun Bagan	Free
9 June 2019	(India) Ashutosh Mehta	(India) Pune City	(India) Mohun Bagan	Undisclosed
9 June 2019	(India) Surabuddin Mollick	(India) East Bengal	(India) Mohun Bagan	Undisclosed
9 June 2019	(India) Koushik Sarkar	(India) East Bengal	(India) Mohun Bagan	Undisclosed
9 June 2019	(India) Dibyendu Sarkar	(India) Rainbow	(India) Mohun Bagan	Undisclosed
9 June 2019	(India) Babun Das	(India) Pathachakra	(India) Mohun Bagan	Undisclosed
9 June 2019	(India) Boithang Haokip	(India) Bengaluru	(India) East Bengal	Undisclosed
9 June 2019	(Spain) Fran Morante	(Spain) Inter de Madrid	(India) Mohun Bagan	Free
9 June 2019	(India) Pintu Mahato	(India) Mohun Bagan	(India) East Bengal	Free
9 June 2019	(India) Debjit Majumder	(India) ATK	(India) East Bengal	Loan
9 June 2019	(India) V.P. Suhair	(India) East Bengal	(India) Mohun Bagan	Undisclosed
9 June 2019	(India) Abhishek Ambekar	(India) Mohun Bagan	(India) East Bengal	Free
14 June 2019	(India) Lalthuammawia Ralte	(India) Goa	(India) East Bengal	Loan
14 June 2019	(India) Lalkhawpuimawia	(India) Aizawl	(India) Churchill Brothers	Undisclosed
14 June 2019	(India) Glan Martins	(India) SC Goa	(India) Churchill Brothers	Undisclosed
14 June 2019	(India) Joseph Clemente	(India) SC Goa	(India) Churchill Brothers	Undisclosed
14 June 2019	(India) Quan Gomes	(India) SC Goa	(India) Churchill Brothers	Undisclosed
14 June 2019	(India) Schubert Pereira	(India) SC Goa	(India) Vasco	Undisclosed
17 June 2019	(England) Kallum Higginbotham	(Scotland) Dunfermline	(India) Real Kashmir	Free
19 June 2019	(Spain) Salva Chamorro	(Greece) Doxa Drama	(India) Mohun Bagan	Free
19 June 2019	(India) Nongdamba Naorem	(India) Kerala Blasters	(India) Mohun Bagan	Loan
20 June 2019	(India) Sheikh Faiaz	(India) Kerala Blasters	(India) Mohun Bagan	Undisclosed
27 June 2019	(India) Malemngamba Meetei	(India) NEROCA	(India) Gokulam Kerala	Undisclosed
30 June 2019	(India) Samuel Lalmuanpuia	(India) Punjab	(India) Shillong Lajong	Loan Return
30 June 2019	(Nigeria) Kareem Omolaja	(India) Punjab	(India) Aizawl	Loan return
1 July 2019	(India) Syed Suhail Pasha	(India) Chennaiyin B	(India) Chennai City	Free
1 July 2019	(India) Vineeth Kumar Velmurugan	(India) Chennai City U18	(India) Chennai City	-
1 July 2019	(India) Bishorjit Singh	(India) NEROCA	(India) TRAU	Free
1 July 2019	(India) Novin Gurung	(India) Shillong Lajong	(India) Real Kashmir	Undisclosed
1 July 2019	(India) Asheer Akhtar	(India) Bengaluru FC	(India) East Bengal	Free
1 July 2019	(India) Ronaldo Oliveira	(India) Salgaocar	(India) East Bengal	13 Th.€
1 July 2019	(India) Phurba Lachenpa	(India) Shillong Lajong	(India) Real Kashmir	Undisclosed
1 July 2019	(India) Asifullah Khan	(India) Jamshedpur	(India) Real Kashmir	Free
1 July 2019	(India) Chesterpoul Lyngdoh	(India) Churchill Brothers	(India) Real Kashmir	Free
1 July 2019	(India) Sagolsem Bikash Singh	(India) Quess East Bengal U18	(India) East Bengal	-
1 July 2019	(India) Huidrom Naocha Singh	(India) NEROCA	(India) Gokulam Kerala	Free
1 July 2019	(India) G. Sanju	(India) Gokulam Kerala B	(India) Gokulam Kerala	-
1 July 2019	(India) Muthu Irulandi Mayakkannan	(India) Gokulam Kerala B	(India) Gokulam Kerala	-
1 July 2019	(India) Shibil Muhammed	(India) Gokulam Kerala B	(India) Gokulam Kerala	-
1 July 2019	(India) Rahul KP	(India) Gokulam Kerala B	(India) Gokulam Kerala	-
1 July 2019	(India) Myron Mendes	(India) Bengaluru	(India) Gokulam Kerala	Free
1 July 2019	(India) Mohammed Tajuddin	N/A	(India) TRAU	-
1 July 2019	(India) Soraisham Dinesh Singh	N/A	(India) TRAU	-
1 July 2019	(India) Konsam Phalguni Singh	N/A	(India) TRAU	-
1 July 2019	(India) Wahengbam Angousana Luwang	N/A	(India) TRAU	-
1 July 2019	(India) Subha Ghosh	(India) Mohun Bagan AC U18	(India) Mohun Bagan	Free
1 July 2019	(India) Deep Saha	(India) Mohun Bagan AC U18	(India) Mohun Bagan	Free
1 July 2019	(India) Bedashwor Singh	(India) Chennaiyin	(India) TRAU	Free
1 July 2019	(India) Sukhdev Singh	N/A	(India) Mohun Bagan	Free
5 July 2019	(Nigeria) Danjuma Ademola Kuti	(United Arab Emirates) Al-Fujairah	(India) Punjab	Undisclosed
8 July 2019	(India) Gurpreet Singh	(India) Aizawl	(India) TRAU	Free
13 July 2019	(India) Biaklian Paite	(India) NEROCA	(India) TRAU	Free
18 July 2019	(The Gambia) Dawda Ceesay	(India) Mohun Bagan	(India) Punjab	Free
19 July 2019	(India) Abhijit Sarkar	(India) Chennaiyin	(India) East Bengal	Loan
21 July 2019	(Uganda) Henry Kisekka	N/A	(India) Gokulam Kerala	-
24 July 2019	(India) Lalramchullova	(India) East Bengal	(India) Mohun Bagan	Undisclosed
29 July 2019	(Brazil) Bruno Pelissari	(Brazil) Votuporanguense	(India) Gokulam Kerala	Free
31 July 2019	(Trinidad and Tobago) Willis Plaza	(Bangladesh) Brothers Union	(India) Churchill Brothers	Loan return
31 July 2019	(India) Dalraj Singh	(India) Mohun Bagan	(India) Real Kashmir	Undisclosed
31 July 2019	(India) Sebastian Thangmuansang	(India) NEROCA	(India) Gokulam Kerala	Free
31 July 2019	(India) Jimmy Maibam Singh	(India) Chhinga Veng	(India) TRAU	Free
31 July 2019	(India) Robinson Singh	(India) Bengaluru	(India) TRAU	Free
31 July 2019	(India) Mohammad Abdul Salam	(India) NEROCA	(India) Real Kashmir	Free
31 July 2019	(India) Arjun Jayaraj	(India) Gokulam Kerala	(India) Kerala Blasters	Free
31 July 2019	(India) Altamash Sayed	(India) Bengaluru	(India) Real Kashmir	Free
1 August 2019	(India) Ubaid CK	(India) NEROCA	(India) Gokulam Kerala	Free
1 August 2019	(India) Abhinas Ruidas	(India) Mohun Bagan	(India) NEROCA	Free
1 August 2019	(India) Vicky Baskaran	(India) Churchill Brothers	(India) Gokulam Kerala	Free
2 August 2019	(India) Sanju Pradhan	(India) Odisha	(India) Punjab	Free
6 August 2019	(Spain) Marcos	(Spain) Atlético Baleares	(India) East Bengal	Free
8 August 2019	(Nigeria) Orok Essien	N/A	(India) Punjab	-
9 August 2019	(Brazil) Sérgio Barboza	(Laos) Master 7	(India) Punjab	Free
9 August 2019	(India) Sukhdev Patil	(India) Odisha	(India) Churchill Brothers	Free
10 August 2019	(Trinidad and Tobago) Daneil Cyrus	(Saudi Arabia) Al-Orobah	(India) Mohun Bagan	Undisclosed
13 August 2019	(India) Beikhokhei Beingaichho	N/A	(India) Punjab	-
13 August 2019	(India) Bali Gagandeep	(Spain) East Bengal	(India) Punjab	Free
20 August 2019	(India) Lalmuanzova	(India) Chhinga Veng	(India) Gokulam Kerala	Free
20 August 2019	(India) Lalliansanga	(India) Chhinga Veng	(India) Gokulam Kerala	Free
23 August 2019	(Spain) Fito	(Spain) Cartagena	(India) Chennai City	Free
23 August 2019	(Spain) Juan Mera	(Spain) Leioa	(India) East Bengal	Free
27 August 2019	(India) Vinod Pandey	(India) ONGC	(India) Mohun Bagan	Free
30 August 2019	(Spain) Julen Colinas	(Spain) UCAM Murcia	(India) Mohun Bagan	Free
31 August 2019	(Brazil) Danilo Quipapá	(Brazil) Central	(India) Punjab	Free
31 August 2019	(Liberia) Teah Dennis Jr.	(India) Southern Samity	(India) Punjab	Free
31 August 2019	(India) Denechandra Meitei	(India) NEROCA	(India) TRAU	Free
1 September 2019	(India) Kivi Zhimomi	(India) NorthEast United	(India) Churchill Brothers	Loan
1 September 2019	(India) Loken Meitei	(India) Kerala Blasters	(India) TRAU	Free
1 September 2019	(India) Jayananda Singh	N/A	(India) Punjab	-
2 September 2019	(India) Lalrinchhana Tochhawng	(India) Aizawl	(India) Punjab	Free
2 September 2019	(India) Abhinas Ruidas	(India) NEROCA	(India) TRAU	Free
'3 September 2019	(Uganda) Isaac Isinde	(Uganda) Kirinya–Jinja	(India) TRAU	Free
3 September 2019	(India) Deepak Devrani	(India) Punjab	(India) TRAU	Free
3 September 2019	(Ghana) Abednego Tetteh	(India) Real Kashmir	(India) TRAU	Free
3 September 2019	(India) Tanmoy Ghosh	(India) South United	(India) TRAU	Free
4 September 2019	(Trinidad and Tobago) Taryk Sampson	(Trinidad and Tobago) Central	(India) NEROCA	Free
4 September 2019	(Trinidad and Tobago) Marvin Phillip	(Trinidad and Tobago) FC Santa Rosa	(India) NEROCA	Free
4 September 2019	(India) Abhishek Das	(India) Gokulam Kerala	(India) TRAU	Free
4 September 2019	(Nigeria) Oguchi Uche	(Nigeria) Heartland	(India) TRAU	Free
4 September 2019	(India) Ramandeep Singh	N/A	(India) TRAU	-
4 September 2019	(India) Rahul Das	(India) Lonestar Kashmir	(India) TRAU	Free
4 September 2019	(India) Shayan Roy	(India) Odisha	(India) TRAU	Free
4 September 2019	(Mali) Boubacar Diarra	(Saudi Arabia) Narjan	(India) NEROCA	Free
4 September 2019	(Mali) Ousmane Diawara	(Sweden) IFK Stocksund	(India) NEROCA	Free
5 September 2019	(Brazil) Marcel	(Iraq) Erbil	(India) TRAU	Free
5 September 2019	(Togo) Gaty Kouami	N/A	(India) NEROCA	-
5 September 2019	(Togo) Sekle Yawo Zico	N/A	(India) NEROCA	-
6 September 2019	(Spain) Joaquín García	(Hong Kong) King Fung	(India) Churchill Brothers	Free
6 September 2019	(Ghana) Kalif Alhassan	(India) Punjab	(India) Churchill Brothers	Free
6 September 2019	(Trinidad and Tobago) Radanfah Abu Bakr	N/A	(India) Churchill Brothers	-
6 September 2019	(Trinidad and Tobago) Robert Primus	(India) Punjab	(India) Churchill Brothers	Undisclosed
18 September 2019	(India) Dharmaraj Ravanan	(India) Real Kashmir	(India) Gokulam Kerala	Free
20 September 2019	(Pakistan) Kashif Siddiqi	(England) Oxford United	(India) Real Kashmir	Loan
26 September 2019	(India) Imanuel Lalthazuala	(India) Chhinga Veng	(India) Punjab	Free
28 September 2019	(India) Zodingliana Ralte	(India) Goa B	(India) NEROCA	Free
28 September 2019	(India) Siam Hanghal	(India) Odisha	(India) NEROCA	Free
29 September 2019	(Trinidad and Tobago) Nathaniel García	(Trinidad and Tobago) Point Fortin	(India) Gokulam Kerala	Free
1 October 2019	(Cameroon) Aser Pierrick Dipanda	(India) Southern Samity	(India) Punjab	Free
1 October 2019	(India) Yumnam Raju	(India) Jamshedpur	(India) Punjab	Free
1 October 2019	(India) Prosenjit Chakraborty	(India) Chennaiyin	(India) Punjab	Free
31 October 2019	(Nigeria) Danjuma Ademola Kuti	(India) Aryan	(India) Punjab	Free
31 October 2019	(India) James Kithan	(India) Peerless	(India) Churchill Brothers	End of Loan
2 November 2019	(Afghanistan) Zohib Islam Amiri	(Maldives) New Radiant	(India) Gokulam Kerala	Free
14 November 2019	(The Gambia) Dawda Ceesay	(India) Punjab	(India) Churchill Brothers	Free
15 November 2019	(India) William Lalnunfela	N/A	(India) Aizawl	Free
15 November 2019	(Nigeria) Kingsley Obumneme	N/A	(India) Aizawl	Free
17 November 2019	(India) Jithin MS	(India) Kerala Blasters	(India) Gokulam Kerala	Undisclosed
26 November 2019	(England) Jay Hart	(Bhutan) Thimpu City	(India) Punjab Kerala	Free
28 November 2019	(Mali) Abdoulaye Kanouté	(Lebanon) Shabab Sahel	(India) Aizawl	Free
1 December 2019	(India) Bikash Yumnam	(India) Punjab	(India) Indian Arrows	Loan
1 December 2019	(India) Manvir Singh	(India) Kerala Blasters	(India) Indian Arrows	Loan
1 December 2019	(India) Ayush Adhikari	(India) Punjab	(India) Indian Arrows	Loan
5 December 2019	(India) Khwetelhi Thopi	N/A	(India) TRAU	-
8 December 2019	(Mali) Amadou Alou Sissoko	N/A	(India) Aizawl	Free
14 December 2019	(Ghana) Joseph Adjei	(Bahrain) Malkiya Club	(India) Aizawl	Free
14 December 2019	(Nigeria) Joseph Olaleye	N/A	(India) TRAU	Free
17 December 2019	(Senegal) Baba Diawara	N/A	(India) Mohun Bagan	-
21 December 2019	(Tajikistan) Komron Tursunov	(Tajikistan) Istiklol	(India) Mohun Bagan	Free
1 January 2020	(India) Zothanmawia	(India) Chhinga Veng	(India) Aizawl	Free
1 January 2020	(India) Malsawmzuala	(India) Chhinga Veng	(India) Aizawl	Free
1 January 2020	(India) Ramhlunchhunga	Unknown	(India) Aizawl	Free
1 January 2020	(India) Lalthlahlova	(India) Aizawl	(India) Aizawl	Free
1 January 2020	(India) Lovepreet Singh	(India) Kerala Blasters	(India) Indian Arrows	Loan
1 January 2020	(India) Varun Mathur	(India) FC Goa B	(India) Chennai City	Free
1 January 2020	(India) Nicholas Fernandes	N/A	(India) Gokulam Kerala	-
1 January 2020	(India) Akash Sangwan	N/A	(India) Churchill Brothers	Free
1 January 2020	(India) Nitesh Aswani	N/A	(India) South United	Free
1 January 2020	(India) Monotosh Chakladar	(India) Peerless	(India) East Bengal	-
1 January 2020	(India) Nirmal Chhetri	N/A	(India) Punjab	-
1 January 2019	(India) Nikhil Raj	(India) Kickstart FC	(India) Punjab	Loan
1 January 2019	(India) Sena Ralte	N/A	(India) Real Kashmir	Loan
5 January 2020	(India) Tarif Akhand	(India) Hyderabad	(India) Chennai City	Loan
7 January 2020	(India) Imran Khan	(India) Goa	(India) NEROCA	Loan
8 January 2020	(India) Abhash Thapa	(India) Hyderabad	(India) East Bengal	Loan
13 January 2020	(India) Pritam Singh	N/A	(India) NEROCA	-
14 January 2020	(India) Edmund Lalrindika	(India) Bengaluru	(India) East Bengal	Loan
14 January 2020	(India) Alwyn George	N/A	(India) Punjab	-
14 January 2020	(Brazil) Valci Júnior	(Malaysia) Perlis	(India) Punjab	Free
14 January 2020	(India) Anuj Kumar	(India) Hyderabad	(India) Indian Arrows	Loan
15 January 2020	(Ghana) William Opoku	(India) BSS Sporting	(India) Aizawl	Free
15 January 2020	(Nigeria) Justice Morgan	(India) George Telegraph	(India) Aizawl	Free
17 January 2020	(Nigeria) Joël Ayeni	(India) George Telegraph	(India) TRAU	Free
15 January 2020	(Argentina) Matías Verón	(Argentina) Juventud Unida de Río Cuarto	(India) TRAU	Free
22 January 2020	(Liberia) Ansumana Kromah	(India) Peerless	(India) East Bengal	Free
23 January 2020	(Serbia) Jan Muzangu	(Switzerland) FC Basel U21	(India) Chennai City	Loan
23 January 2020	(Nigeria) Daniel Bartholomew	Unknown	(India) Gokulam Kerala	-
23 January 2020	(Nigeria) Lucky Emmanuel	Unknown	(India) Gokulam Kerala	-
23 January 2020	(Ghana) Philip Adjah Teteh	(India) Calcutta Customs	(India) Gokulam Kerala	-
23 January 2020	(Portugal) Sócrates Pedro	(Portugal) Lusitano	(India) Churchill Brothers	-
25 January 2020	(India) Anuj Kumar	(India) Hyderabad	(India) Indian Arrows	Loan
28 January 2020	(India) Govin Singh	(India) Southern Samity	(India) NEROCA	-
1 February 2020	(India) Subhash Singh	(India) Real Kashmir	(India) NEROCA	Free
1 February 2020	(India) Robin Singh	(India) Hyderabad	(India) Real Kashmir	Loan
1 February 2020	(India) Rohit Mirza	N/A	(India) Chennai City	-
1 February 2020	(India) Jedidi Haokip	N/A	(India) TRAU	-
2 February 2020	(India) Avilash Paul	(India) ATK	(India) Mohun Bagan	Loan
5 February 2020	(Nigeria) Kingsley Obumneme	(India) Aizawl	(India) Punjab	Free
10 February 2020	(Rwanda) Atuheire Kipson	(Cambodia) Nagaworld	(India) Gokulam Kerala	Free
12 February 2020	(Hungary) Attila Busai	N/A	(India) NEROCA	
12 February 2020	(Spain) Víctor Pérez	(Lithuania) Žalgiris	(India) East Bengal	
28 February 2020	(Moldova) Petru Leucă	N/A	(India) TRAU	
2 March 2020	(Costa Rica) Jhonny Acosta	(India) Universidad de Costa Rica	(India) East Bengal	

=== Unannounced signings ===
The following players have appeared either in a match or on the bench for an I-League club without being announced as signed.

Name	Previous club	ISL club	Notes

=== Released players ===
This list includes players who were released from their club and who have yet to sign with another I-League club or who have left the league.

Date	Name	Released by	New club (Non-I-League)	Transfer Type
11 March 2019	(Mexico) Enrique Esqueda	(India) Quess East Bengal	N/A	Free Agent
26 March 2019	(Spain) Juan Quero	(India) Punjab	N/A	Free Agent
31 March 2019	(India) Sinivasan Pandiyan	(India) Chennai City	(India) Chennaiyin	Loan return
11 April 2019	(Brazil) Guilherme Batata	(India) Gokulam Kerala	(Indonesia) Sleman	Free
29 April 2019	(Trinidad and Tobago) Willis Plaza	(India) Churchill Brothers	(Bangladesh) Brothers Union	Loan
1 May 2019	(Egypt) Omar Elhussieny	(India) Mohun Bagan	N/A	Free Agent
1 May 2019	(Ivory Coast) Lancine Touré	(India) Punjab	(Bangladesh) Bashundhara Kings	Undisclosed
19 May 2019	(Lebanon) Hussein Eldor	(India) Churchill Brothers	(Malaysia) Perak	Free Agent
31 May 2019	(India) Boris Singh	(India) Indian Arrows	(India) ATK	Loan return
31 May 2019	(India) Abhijit Sarkar	(India) Indian Arrows	(India) Chennaiyin	Loan return
31 May 2019	(India) Deepak Tangri	(India) Indian Arrows	(India) Chennaiyin	Loan return
31 May 2019	(India) Rahim Ali	(India) Indian Arrows	(India) Chennaiyin	Loan return
31 May 2019	(India) Aniket Jadhav	(India) Indian Arrows	(India) Jamshedpur	Loan return
31 May 2019	(India) Amarjit Singh	(India) Indian Arrows	(India) Jamshedpur	Loan return
31 May 2019	(India) Bilal Khan	(India) Churchill Brothers	(India) Kerala Blasters	Free
31 May 2019	(India) Anwar Ali	(India) Indian Arrows	(India) Mumbai City	Loan return
31 May 2019	(India) Wayne Vaz	(India) Indian Arrows	(India) Pune City	Loan return
31 May 2019	(Spain) Toni Dovale	(India) Quess East Bengal	(Cyprus) Nea Salamis	Loan return
31 May 2019	(India) Cavin Lobo	(India) Churchill Brothers	(India) ATK	Loan return
31 May 2019	(India) Sheikh Faiaz	(India) Churchill Brothers	(India) ATK	Loan return
31 May 2019	(India) Imran Khan	(India) Gokulam Kerala	(India) Goa	Loan return
31 May 2019	(India) Siam Hanghal	(India) Quess East Bengal	(India) Odisha	Loan return
31 May 2019	(India) Bikramjeet Singh	(India) Mohun Bagan	(India) Mumbai City	Loan return
31 May 2019	(India) H. Lalmuankima	(India) Gokulam Kerala	(India) ATK	Loan return
31 May 2019	(India) Gaurav Bora	(India) Chennai City	(India) Pune City	Loan return
31 May 2019	(Equatorial Guinea) Eduardo Ferreira	(India) NEROCA	(India) ATK	Loan return
31 May 2019	(Bhutan) Chencho Gyeltshen	(India) NEROCA	(India) Bengaluru	Loan return
31 May 2019	(India) Lalramzauva Khiangte	(India) Pune City B	(India) Mohun Bagan	Loan return
9 June 2019	(India) Jobby Justin	(India) Quess East Bengal	(India) ATK	Free
9 June 2019	(India) Lovepreet Singh	(India) Indian Arrows	(India) Kerala Blasters	Free
9 June 2019	(India) Sourav Das	(India) Mohun Bagan	(India) Mumbai City	Free
9 June 2019	(India) Prabhsukhan Singh Gill	(India) Indian Arrows	(India) Bengaluru	Free
9 June 2019	(India) Suresh Singh Wangjam	(India) Indian Arrows	(India) Bengaluru	Free
9 June 2019	(India) Edwin Sydney Vanspaul	(India) Chennai City	(India) Chennaiyin	Free
9 June 2019	(India) Lalengmawia	(India) Indian Arrows	(India) NorthEast United	Free
9 June 2019	(India) Michael Regin	(India) Chennai City	(India) ATK	Undisclosed
9 June 2019	(India) Kingshuk Debnath	(India) Quess East Bengal	(India) Bhawanipore	Free
10 June 2019	(India) Hmingthanmawia	(India) Aizawl	(India) Mumbai City	Undisclosed
12 June 2019	(India) Surchandra Singh	(India) Real Kashmir	(India) Mumbai City	Free
20 June 2019	(India) Rahul Kannoly Praveen	(India) Indian Arrows	(India) Kerala Blasters	Free
20 June 2019	(India) Imran Khan	(India) Goa	(India) Mohun Bagan	Loan
1 July 2019	(Nigeria) Felix Chidi Odili	(India) NEROCA	(India) Rainbow	Free
1 July 2019	(Ivory Coast) Léonce Dodoz	(India) Aizawl	(India) Bhawanipore	Undisclosed
1 July 2019	(Liberia) Ansumana Kromah	(India) Aizawl	(India) Peerless SC	Free
1 July 2019	(Trinidad and Tobago) Anthony Wolfe	(India) Churchill Brothers	(India) Peerless SC	Free
1 July 2019	(Liberia) Varney Kallon	(India) NEROCA	(India) Peerless SC	Free
1 July 2019	(Syria) Mahmoud Amnah	(India) Punjab	(India) Southern Samity	Free
1 July 2019	(Japan) Yuta Kinowaki	(India) Mohun Bagan	N/A	Free Agent
1 July 2019	(India) Mainak Akuli	(India) Mohun Bagan	N/A	Free Agent
1 July 2019	(Nigeria) Kingsley Obumneme	(India) Mohun Bagan	N/A	Free agent
1 July 2019	(India) Ricardo Cardozo	(India) Mohun Bagan	N/A	Free Agent
1 July 2019	(India) William Lalnunfela	(India) Mohun Bagan	N/A	Free Agent
1 July 2019	(India) Dipankar Das	(India) Mohun Bagan	N/A	Free agent
1 July 2019	(Colombia) Jorge Caceido	(India) Pune City	(Spain) Real Avilés	Free
1 July 2019	(India) Asheer Akhtar	(India) Punjab	(India) Quess East Bengal	Free
1 July 2019	(India) Asifullah Khan	(India) Jamshedpur	(India) Real Kashmir	Free
1 July 2019	(India) Ninthoinganba Meetei	(India) Indian Arrows	(India) NorthEast United	Free
1 July 2019	(India) Jagpreet Singh	(India) Punjab	N/A	Free Agent
1 July 2019	(Ukraine) Roland Bilala	(India) Punjab	N/A	Free Agent
3 July 2019	(India) Shibinraj Kunniyil	(India) Gokulam Kerala	(India) Kerala Blasters	Free
12 July 2019	(Uganda) Khalid Aucho	(India) Churchill Brothers	(Egypt) Misr Lel Makkasa	500 Th.€
16 July 2019	(Nigeria) Kareem Omolaja	(India) Aizawl	(India) Mohammedan	Free
17 July 2019	(Nigeria) Danjuma Ademola Kuti	(United Arab Emirates) Al-Fujairah	(India) Aryan	Loan
20 July 2019	(Nigeria) Ejiogu Emmanuel	(India) Gokulam Kerala	(India) Aryan	Free
31 July 2019	(India) Arjun Jayaraj	(India) Gokulam Kerala	(India) Kerala Blasters	Free
4 June 2019	(India) Salam Ranjan Singh	(India) Quess East Bengal	(India) ATK	Free
27 July 2019	(Australia) Aryn Williams	(India) NEROCA	(Indonesia) Persebaya Surabaya	Free
31 August 2019	(India) Sandeep Singh	(India) TRAU	(India) ATK	Loan return
31 July 2019	(India) Robinson Singh	(India) Bengaluru	(India) TRAU	Free
31 July 2019	(India) Altamash Sayed	(India) Bengaluru	(India) Real Kashmir	Free
2 August 2019	(India) Sanju Pradhan	(India) Odisha	(India) Punjab	Free
7 August 2019	(India) Darren Caldeira	(India) Mohun Bagan	(India) Kerala Blasters	Free
9 August 2019	(India) Sukhdev Patil	(India) Mumbai City	(India) Churchill Brothers	Free
13 August 2019	(Ivory Coast) Lorougnon Remi	(India) Churchill Brothers	(Lebanon) Shabab El-Bourj	Free
23 August 2019	(Slovakia) Jozef Kapláň	(India) Chennai City	(Slovakia) OSK Besenova	Free
31 May 2019	(India) Anwar Ali	(India) Indian Arrows	(India) Mumbai City	Loan Return
1 September 2019	(India) Ghani Ahmmed Nigam	(India) Gokulam	(India) Hyderabad	Free
1 September 2019	(India) Abhash Thapa	(India) Real Kashmir	(India) Hyderabad	Free
1 September 2019	(India) Tarif Akhand	(India) Chennai City	(India) Hyderabad	Free
1 September 2019	(India) Laldanmawia Ralte	(India) Quess East Bengal	(India) Hyderabad	Free
1 September 2019	(India) Ashish Rai	(India) Indian Arrows	(India) Hyderabad	Free
4 September 2019	(Ghana) David Addo	(India) Gokulam Kerala	(India) BSS Sporting	Free
7 September 2019	(India) Amey Ranawade	(India) Mohun Bagan	(India) Goa	Free
9 September 2019	(Spain) Néstor Gordillo	(India) Chennai City	(India) Hyderabad	Free
24 October 2019	(India) Umesh Harijan	(India) Churchill Brothers	(India) South United	Free
1 December 2019	(Nigeria) Orok Essien	(India) Punjab	N/A	Free Agent
1 December 2019	(Spain) Joaquín García	(India) Churchill Brothers	N/A	Free Agent
17 December 2019	(Spain) Salva Chamorro	(India) Mohun Bagan	N/A	Free Agent
21 December 2019	(Spain) Julen Colinas	(India) Mohun Bagan	N/A	Free Agent
1 January 2019	(India) Subhonil Ghosh	(India) East Bengal	(India) Garhwal	Loan
1 January 2019	(India) Tamal Naskar	(India) Indian Arrows	(India) Chennaiyin B	Loan
6 January 2019	(India) Imran Khan	(India) Mohun Bagan	(India) FC Goa	End Of Loan
7 January 2019	(Spain) Pedro Manzi	(India) Chennai City	(Japan) Albirex Niigata	125k €
14 January 2020	(India) Kunzang Bhutia	(India) Churchill Brothers	(India) Hyderabad	Free
14 January 2020	(England) Jay Hart	(India) Punjab	(India) Punjab B	-
21 January 2020	(Brazil) Marcel	(India) TRAU	(Brazil) Jacuipense	Undisclosed
21 January 2020	(Spain) Salva Chamorro	(India) Mohun Bagan	(Spain) Mar Menor FC	Free
1 February 2020	(India) Dibyendu Sarkar	(India) Mohun Bagan	(India) Bhawanipore	Free
1 February 2020	(India) Ronaldo Oliveira	(India) East Bengal	(India) Kerala Blasters B	Free
7 February 2020	(Spain) Joaquín García	(India) Churchill Brothers	(Spain) Lorca	Free
