= 2018–19 Mohun Bagan FC season =

Indian football club season

Mohun Bagan
2018–19 season
- President: Swapan Sadhan Bose
- Head coach: Sankarlal Chakraborty (until 6 January 2018); Khalid Jamil (from 7 January 2018)
- Stadium: Mohun Bagan Ground; Salt Lake Stadium
- I-League: 5th
- Calcutta Football League: Champions
- Super Cup: Walkover
- Top goalscorer: League: Dipanda Dicka (8 goals); All: Dipanda Dicka (18 goals)
- Highest home attendance: 62628
- Lowest home attendance: 3388
- Average home league attendance: 27270
Home colours	Away colours

The 2018–19 Mohun Bagan FC season was the club's 12th season in I-League and 129th season since its establishment in 1889. They finished 5th in the I-League and were crowned Champions in the Calcutta Football League.

== Sponsors ==
As of 7 July 2018

Sponsors Type	Sponsor's Name
Sponsor	—
Co-Sponsor	M.P Birla Cement, Ripley
Kit Sponsor	Shiv Naresh

== Players ==
Current Squad
Squad No.	Name	Nationality	Position
Goalkeepers
1	Shankar Roy	(India)	GK
22	Shilton Paul	(India)	GK
31	Ricardo Cardozo	(India)	GK
—	Mainak Akuli	(India)	GK
Defenders
3	Kingsley Obumneme (C)	(Nigeria)	DF
4	Dalraj Singh	(India)	DF
5	Gurjinder Kumar	(India)	DF
14	Arijit Bagui	(India)	DF
18	Abhishek Ambekar	(India)	DF
19	Lalchhawnkima	(India)	DF
28	Bikramjeet Singh	(India)	DF
37	Amey Ranawade	(India)	DF
Midfielders
7	Yuta Kinowaki	(Japan)	MF
8	Sourav Das	(India)	MF
11	William Lalnunfela	(India)	MF
15	Darren Caldeira	(India)	MF
21	Omar Elhussieny	(Egypt)	MF
23	Mehtab Hossain	(India)	MF
25	Tirthankar Sarkar	(India)	MF
26	Shilton D'Silva	(India)	MF
27	Pintu Mahata	(India)	MF
33	Britto PM	(India)	MF
34	Abhinas Ruidas	(India)	MF
47	Sheikh Faiaz (on loan from ATK)	(India)	MF
50	Sony Norde (VC)	(Haiti)	MF
—	Dipankar Das	(India)	MF
—	Lalramzauva Khiangte	(India)	MF
Forwards
9	Dipanda Dicka	(Cameroon)	FW
10	Henry Kisekka	(Uganda)	FW
35	Azharuddin Mallick	(India)	FW

Last updated: 9 January 2019

== Technical staff ==
Position	Name
Chief coach	(India) Khalid Jamil
Assistant coach	(India) Naseem Ali
Goalkeeping coach	(India) Arpan Dey
Physical Trainer	(India) Samiran Nag
Physiotherapist	(India) Soumya Bhattacharjee
Club Doctor	(India) Dr. Protim Roy
Team Manager	—

Last updated: 7 January 2019

== Competitions ==
=== Overall ===
Competition	First match	Last match	Current Position	Final Position
I-League	27 October 2018	8 March 2019	—	5th
Super Cup	Withdrew			
IFA Shield	7 July 2018	19 July 2018	—	2nd
Calcutta Football League	4 August 2018	18 September 2018	—	1st

Updated to match played 12 January 2019
Source: Competitions

=== Overview ===
Competition	Record							
Competition	G	W	D	L	GF	GA	GD	Win %
I-League	20	8	5	7	27	28	−1	40.00
Super Cup	0	0	0	0	0	0	+0	—
CFL	11	9	2	0	27	6	+21	81.82
Total	31	17	7	7	54	34	+20	54.84

Updated to match played March 2019
Source: Competitions

=== I-League ===
Pos	Team	Pld	W	D	L	GF	GA	GD	Pts
3	Real Kashmir	20	10	7	3	25	14	+11	37 (Note: The game between Minerva Punjab and Real Kashmir was rescheduled, but eventually it was not played and both teams were awarded a point.)
4	Churchill Brothers	20	9	7	4	35	23	+12	34
5	Mohun Bagan	20	8	5	7	27	28	−1	29
6	NEROCA	20	7	5	8	27	26	+1	26
7	Aizawl	20	6	6	8	27	28	−1	24

Source: I-league
Rules for classification: 1) points; 2) head-to-head points; 3) head-to-head goal difference; 4) goal difference; 5) number of goals scored; 6) drawing of lots
Notes:

Results summary

Overall								Home						Away					
Pld	W	D	L	GF	GA	GD	Pts	W	D	L	GF	GA	GD	W	D	L	GF	GA	GD
20	8	5	7	27	28	−1	29	3	3	4	12	15	−3	5	2	3	15	13	+2

Last updated: 12 January 2019.

Results by round

Round	1	2	3	4	5	6	7	8	9	10	11	12	13	14	15	16	17	18	19	20
Ground	A	H	A	A	H	H	A	A	H	A	H	H	H	H	H	A	A	A	H	A
Result	D	D	W	W	L	D	L	W	W	L	L	W	W	L	D	D	W	L	L	W

A = Away; H = Home; W = Win; D = Draw; L = Loss

Last updated: 12 January 2019.
Source: Competitions

=== Calcutta Football League ===
Pos	Team	Pld	W	D	L	GF	GA	GD	Pts	Qualification or relegation
1	Mohun Bagan (C)	11	9	2	0	27	6	+21	29	Champion
2	Peerless SC	11	8	1	2	20	8	+12	25	
3	East Bengal	11	7	2	2	19	7	+12	23	
4	Mohammedan	11	6	1	4	12	8	+4	19	Qualified for I-League 2nd Division
5	Rainbow	11	5	2	4	15	13	+2	17	Qualified for I-League 2nd Division

Updated to match(es) played on 26 September 2018. Source:
(C) Champions

== Matches ==
=== Calcutta Football League ===
4 August 2018 1	Mohun Bagan	1–0	Pathachakra	Kolkata
16:30 IST	Kisekka 76'	Report	Lalkamal (yellow card) 47'	Stadium: Mohun Bagan Ground; Referee: Debasish Mandi

7 August 2018 2	Mohun Bagan	3–2	Rainbow	Kolkata
16:30 IST	Dicka 49'; Ambekar 68'; Azharuddin 73'; Kingsley (yellow card) 37'	Report	Sarkar 39'; Sunday 83'	Stadium: Mohun Bagan Ground; Referee: Tanmoy Dhar

12 August 2018 3	Mohun Bagan	1–0	George Telegraph	Kolkata
16:30 IST	Dicka 73'	Report	Shaw (yellow card) 59'; Eche (yellow card) 75'	Stadium: Mohun Bagan Ground; Referee: Nipen Haldar

16 August 2018 4	Mohun Bagan	1–1	Peerless SC	Kolkata
16:30 IST	Kisekka 73'	Report	Kromah 90+1'	Stadium: Mohun Bagan Ground; Referee: Dipu Roy

19 August 2018 5	Mohun Bagan	3–0	Tollygunge Agragami	Kolkata
16:30 IST	Dicka 29'; Azharuddin 35'; William 85'; Kingsley (yellow card) 90+4'	Report		Stadium: Mohun Bagan Ground; Referee: Pranjal Banerjee

25 August 2018 6	Mohun Bagan	5–0	West Bengal Police FC	Kolkata
16:30 IST	Dicka 2', 52', 90+5'; Britto 33'; Kisekka 90+2'	Report	Soumava (yellow card) 24'; Naskar (yellow card) 33'; Pradip (yellow card) 38'; Subrata (yellow card) 41'; Mahendar (yellow card) 62'	Stadium: Mohun Bagan Ground; Referee: Pratick Mondal

29 August 2018 7	Mohun Bagan	2–0	Aryan FC	Kalyani
14:00 IST	D'Silva 9'; Dicka 84'	Report	Roy (yellow card) 54'	Stadium: Kalyani Stadium; Referee: Subhankar Kharmi

2 September 2018 8	East Bengal	2–2	Mohun Bagan	Kolkata
16:30 IST	Acosta 45+1'; Ralte 62'; Amnah (yellow card) 57'	Report	Mahata 19'; Kisekka 29'; Shilton (yellow card) 57'	Stadium: Salt Lake Stadium; Attendance: 66,182; Referee: Pranjal Banerjee

5 September 2018 9	Mohun Bagan	5–0	FCI	Kolkata
16:30 IST	Dicka 45+4', 62', 68'; Sarkar 75'; Kimkima 84'; Kingsley (yellow card) 20'	Report	Dey (red card) 72'	Stadium: Mohun Bagan Ground; Referee: Mithun Kundu

12 September 2018 10	Mohun Bagan	2–0	Calcutta Customs	Kolkata
16:30 IST	Kisekka 3', 44'	Report		Stadium: Mohun Bagan Ground; Referee: Robin Biswas

18 September 2018 11	Mohammedan	1–2	Mohun Bagan	Kolkata
16:30 IST	Adjah 76'; L. Hembram (yellow card) 12'; Farooq (yellow card) 49'	Report	Sarkar 82'; Mahata 89'	Stadium: Salt Lake Stadium; Referee: Tanmoy Dhar

=== I-League ===
27 October 2018 1	Gokulam	1–1	Mohun Bagan	Kozhikode
17:00 IST	Jayaraj 71'; Salman K (yellow card) 21'; Deepak (yellow card) 39'; Batata (yellow card) 70'	Report	Kisekka 41'	Stadium: EMS Stadium; Attendance: 28,437; Referee: Maria J. Arokia

3 November 2018 2	Mohun Bagan	2–2	Aizawl	Kolkata
17:00 IST	Kimkima 44'; Norde 69'; Kisekka (yellow card) 15'	Report	Lalkhawpuimawia 29'; David 90+3'; Bektur (yellow card) 22'; Jaryan (yellow card) 31'	Stadium: Salt Lake Stadium; Attendance: 18,785; Referee: Priyobarta Singh

10 November 2018 3	Indian Arrows	0–2	Mohun Bagan	Cuttack
17:00 IST	Kiyam (yellow card) 40'	Report	Dicka 30', 45+1'	Stadium: Barabati Stadium; Attendance: 4,520; Referee: Rahul K. Gupta

20 November 2018 4	Real Kashmir	0–1	Mohun Bagan	Srinagar
14:00 IST	Katebe (yellow card) 7'	Report	Dipanda 70'; Kinowaki (yellow card) 90+3'	Stadium: TRC Turf Ground; Attendance: 12,760; Referee: A.K. Meitei

25 November 2018 5	Mohun Bagan	0–3	Churchill Brothers	Kolkata
17:00 IST	Kingsley (yellow card) 71'	Report	Ceesay 21'; Plaza 51', 55'; Vaz (yellow card) 53'; Eldor (yellow card) 77'	Stadium: Salt Lake Stadium; Attendance: 22,387; Referee: Venkatesh R.

1 December 2018 6	Mohun Bagan	1–1	Chennai City	Kolkata
17:00 IST	Norde 50'; Das (yellow card) 70'	Report	Nestor 81', (yellow card) 90+2'	Stadium: Salt Lake Stadium; Attendance: 21,985; Referee: Maria J. Arokia

16 December 2018 7	East Bengal	3–2	Mohun Bagan	Kolkata
17:00 IST	Ralte 17', 63'; Justin 44'; Acosta (yellow card) 48'; Manoj (yellow card) 53'	Report	Azharuddin 13'; Dicka 75'; Kingsley (yellow card) 12' (yellow-red card) 59'; Shilton (yellow card) 18'; Kinowaki (yellow card) 25'; Gurjinder (yellow card) 76'; Ambekar (yellow card) 82'	Stadium: Salt Lake Stadium; Attendance: 64,867; Referee: Venkatesh R.

19 December 2018 8	Minerva Punjab	0–1	Mohun Bagan	Panchkula
14:00 IST	Das (yellow card) 38'; Opoku (yellow card) 49'; Njoku (yellow card) 90+4'	Report	Kisekka 79'	Stadium: Tau Devi Lal Stadium; Attendance: 5,157; Referee: Rabichandra Singh

23 December 2018 9	Mohun Bagan	2–0	Shillong Lajong	Kolkata
17:00 IST	Kinowaki 48'; Kisekka 60'	Report	Dohling (yellow card) 45'	Stadium: Salt Lake Stadium; Attendance: 14,436; Referee: Umesh Bora

28 December 2018 10	NEROCA	2–1	Mohun Bagan	Imphal
14:00 IST	Eduardo 24'; Williams 69'; Naorem (yellow card) 45'; Malemn (yellow card) 72'	Report	Kisekka 63'; Kimkima (yellow card) 57'	Stadium: Khuman Lampak Stadium; Attendance: 20,232; Referee: Tejas Nagvenkar

6 January 2019 11	Mohun Bagan	1–2	Real Kashmir	Kolkata
14:00 IST	Norde 42'; Faiaz (yellow card) 45+1'; Kingsley (yellow card) 60'	Report	Robertson 33' (74); Armand (yellow card) 34'; Thapa (yellow card) 41'; Katebe (yellow card) 90+3'	Stadium: Salt Lake Stadium; Attendance: 11,356; Referee: Crystal John

9 January 2019 12	Mohun Bagan	2–0	Minerva Punjab	Kolkata
14:00 IST	Elhussieny 30' (pen.); Dicka 69'; Caldeira (yellow card) 49'; Kinowaki (yellow card) 90+2'; Mehtab (yellow card) 90+3'	Report	Touré (yellow card) 29'; Amandeep (yellow card) 55'	Stadium: Salt Lake Stadium; Attendance: 9,185; Referee: C.R. Srikrishna

12 January 2019 13	Mohun Bagan	1–0	NEROCA	Kolkata
14:00 IST	Norde 78'; Caldeira (yellow card) 78'	Report	Eduardo (yellow card) 81'	Stadium: Salt Lake Stadium; Attendance: 8,780; Referee: Umesh Bora

27 January 2019 14	Mohun Bagan	0-2	East Bengal	Kolkata
17:00 IST	Omar Nabil Rashad Elhussieny (yellow card) 22'; Darren Dominic Caldeira (yellow card) 73'; Sony Norde (yellow card) 83'	Report	Jaime Santos Colado 35'; Lalram Chullova (yellow card) 47'; Jobby Justin 75', (yellow card) 76'	Stadium: Salt Lake Stadium; Attendance: 62,628

30 January 2019 15	Mohun Bagan	2-2	Gokulam Kerala FC	Kolkata
17:00 IST	Shilton Sydney Dsilva 18'; Dicka 60'; Kingsley (yellow card) 79'; Mehtab Hossain (yellow card) 82'	Report	Lalchhawnkima 21' (o.g); Marcus Leric Jr Joseph 24', (yellow card) 58'; Mudde Musa (yellow card) 89'; Arnab Das Sarma (yellow card) 90+2'	Stadium: Salt Lake Stadium

09 February 2019 16	Churchill Brothers	1-1	Mohun Bagan	Goa
17:00 IST	Vigneshwaran Baskaran (yellow card) 50'; Khalid Aucho (yellow card) 72'; Dawda Ceesay (yellow card) 73'; Anthony Anton Wolfe 78'	Report	Dicka 39'; Bikramjit Singh (yellow card) 42'; Sony Norde (yellow card) 44'; Arijit Bagui (yellow card) 70'; Mehtab Hossain (yellow card) 77'	Stadium: Tilak Maidan

16 February 2019 17	Aizawl FC	1-2	Mohun Bagan	Aizawl
14:00 IST	Ghanefo Ansumana Kromah 38'; Zikahi Leonce Dodoz (yellow card) 74'; Govin Singh Moirangthem (yellow card) 77'	Report	Gurjinder Kumar (yellow card) 13'; Kisekka 22'; Bikramjeet Singh 78'; Abinash Ruidas (yellow card) 90+4'	Stadium: Rajiv Gandhi Stadium

24 February 2019 18	Chennai City FC	3-1	Mohun Bagan	Chennai
17:00 IST	Nestor Jesus G (yellow card) 8', (goal) 8'; Sandro R 15'; Pedro Javier M 23', (yellow card) 73'; Mashoor Shereef Thangalakath (red card) 45'; Regin M (yellow card) 60'	Report	William Lalnunfela 37'; Omar Nabil Rashad Elhussieny (yellow card) 45+1'; Bikramjit Singh (yellow card) 55'; Shilton Paul (red card) 78'	Stadium: Jawaharlal Nehru Stadium

28 February 2019 19	Mohun Bagan	1-3	Indian Arrows	Kolkata
17:00 IST	Azharuddin Mallick 17', (yellow card) 54'	Report	Abhijit Sarkar 28'; Asish Rai (yellow card) 45'; Amarjit Singh Kiyamh (yellow card) 68'; Rahul Kannoly Praveen 74'; Rohit Danu 90+4'	Stadium: Salt Lake Stadium

08 March 2019 20	Shillong Lajong	2-3	Mohun Bagan	Shillong
17:00 IST	Phurba Tempa Lachenpa (yellow card) 3'; Phrangki Buam 45+1', 53'	Report	Dicka 4'; Sony Norde 78'; Britto PM 88'	Stadium: Jawaharlal Nehru Stadium

== Statistics ==
=== Goal scorers ===
Rank	No.	Pos.	Player	I-League	Super Cup	CFL	Total
1	9	FW	(Cameroon) Aser Pierrick Dipanda	8	-	10	18
2	10	FW	(Uganda) Henry Kisekka	5	-	6	11
3	50	MF	(Haiti) Sony Norde	5	-	-	5
4	35	FW	(India) Azharuddin Mallick	2	-	2	4
5	48	DF	(India) Lalchhawnkima	1	-	1	2
5	25	MF	(India) Tirthankar Sarkar	-	-	2	2
5	27	MF	(India) Pintu Mahata	-	-	2	2
5	26	MF	(India) Shilton D'Silva	1	-	1	2
5	33	MF	(India) Britto PM	1	-	1	2
5	11	MF	(India) William Lalnunfela	1	-	1	2
6	18	DF	(India) Abhishek Ambekar	-	-	1	1
6	7	MF	(Japan) Yuta Kinowaki	1	-	-	1
6	11	MF	(India) Bikramjeet Singh	1	-	-	1
6	21	MF	(Egypt) Omar Elhussieny	1	-	-	1
Total				27	-	27	54

Updated to match played 8 March 2019
Source: Competitions

=== Disciplinary record ===
Rank	No.	Pos.	Player	I-League			Super Cup			CFL			Total		
Rank	No.	Pos.	Player	Booked	(yellow card) (yellow-red card)	Sent off (straight red)	Booked	(yellow card) (yellow-red card)	Sent off (straight red)	Booked	(yellow card) (yellow-red card)	Sent off (straight red)	Booked	(yellow card) (yellow-red card)	Sent off (straight red)
1	3	DF	(Nigeria) Kingsley Obumneme	2	1	0				3	0	0	5	1	0
2	7	DF	(Japan) Yuta Kinowaki	3	0	0				0	0	0	3	0	0
3	22	GK	(India) Shilton Paul	1	0	0				1	0	0	2	0	0
4	15	MF	(India) Darren Caldeira	2	0	0				0	0	0	2	0	0
5	5	DF	(India) Gurjinder Kumar	1	0	0				0	0	0	1	0	0
5	18	DF	(India) Abhishek Ambekar	1	0	0				0	0	0	1	0	0
6	23	MF	(India) Mehtab Hossain	1	0	0				0	0	0	1	0	0
6	47	MF	(India) Sheikh Faiaz	1	0	0				0	0	0	1	0	0
7	10	FW	(Uganda) Henry Kisekka	1	0	0				0	0	0	1	0	0

Updated to match played 12 January 2019
Source: Competitions
