= 2016–17 Mohun Bagan FC season =

Indian football club season

Mohun Bagan
2016–17 season
- President: Swapan Sadhan Bose
- Head coach: Sanjoy Sen
- Stadium: Mohun Bagan Ground; Rabindra Sarobar Stadium
- I-League: Runners-up
- Calcutta Football League: 3rd
- AFC Cup: Group stage
- Federation Cup: Runners-up
- Top goalscorer: League: Duffy (7); All: Duffy (15)
- Highest home attendance: 23,859 (Mohun Bagan vs East Bengal); 9 April 2017
- Lowest home attendance: 1,298 (Mohun Bagan vs Bengaluru FC); 17 May 2017
- Average home league attendance: 8,118
Home colours	Away colours

The 2016–17 Mohun Bagan FC season was the club's 10th season in I-League and 127th season since its establishment in 1889. They finished third in the Calcutta Football League and runners-up in the I-League. Mohun Bagan finished third in group stage of the AFC Cup and ended the season as runners-up of Federation Cup.

== Transfers ==
=== In ===
==== Pre-season ====
No.	Pos.	Name	Signed from	Ref.
31	GK	(India) Monotosh Ghosh	(India) Shillong Lajong	
42	GK	(India) Agiapal Singh	(India) Tata Football Academy	
42	GK	(India) Shibinraj K	(India) Indian Air Force	
4	DF	(India) Ashim Dey	(India) Aryan	
17	DF	(India) Deepak Devrani	(India) FC Pune City	
18	DF	(India) Avinabo Bag	(India) East Bengal	
19	DF	(India) Tonmoy Ghosh	(India) Mohammedan	
20	DF	(India) Chinta Chandrashekar Rao	(India) Sporting Goa	
23	DF	(Afghanistan) Haroon Fakruddin	(India) DSK Shivajians	
25	DF	(India) Bikramjeet Singh	(India) Mohammedan	
~~2~~	DF	(England) Danny Seaborne	(Scotland) Partick Thistle	
5	MF	(India) Dhananjoy Yadav	(India) Aryan	
8	MF	(India) Babul Biswas	(India) George Telegraph	
11	MF	(India) Thangjam Singh	(India) Mumbai City FC	
13	MF	(India) Sourav Das	(India) Tata Football Academy	
26	MF	(India) Amandeep Singh	(India) Minerva FC	
27	MF	(India) Tapan Maity	(India) Southern Samity	
29	MF	(India) Raynier Fernandes	Air India	
34	MF	(India) C.L.Ruata	(India) Mohun Bagan SAIL Academy	
2	FW	(Nigeria) Daniel Bedemi	(India) Bhawanipore	
9	FW	(Scotland) Darryl Duffy	(India) Salgaocar	
15	FW	(India) Ajay Singh	(India) Mohammedan	
28	FW	(India) Simranjit Singh	(India) Minerva FC	

==== Mid-season ====
No.	Pos.	Name	Signed from	Ref.
1	GK	(India) Pawan Kumar	(India) Chennaiyin	
14	DF	(Equatorial Guinea) Eduardo Ferreira	(India) FC Pune City	
17	DF	(India) Subhasish Bose	(India) Sporting Goa	
45	DF	(India) Anas Edathodika	(India) Delhi Dynamos	
27	MF	(India) Pintu Mahata	(India) Mohun Bagan SAIL Academy	
28	MF	(India) Sehnaj Singh	(India) East Bengal	

=== Out ===
==== Pre-season ====
No.	Pos.	Name	Sold to	Ref.
~~22~~	GK	(India) Vinay Singh	(India) Mohammedan	
~~2~~	DF	(England) Danny Seaborne	Released	
~~2~~	DF	(Brazil) Luciano Sabrosa	Released	
~~39~~	DF	(India) Suman Hazra	Released	
~~8~~	MF	(India) Lalkamal Bhowmick	(India) Bhawanipore	
~~17~~	MF	(India) Ram Malik	(India) Bhawanipore	
~~25~~	MF	(India) Tirthankar Sarkar	(India) Bhawanipore	
~~27~~	MF	(India) Adarsh Tamang	Released	
~~34~~	MF	(India) Manish Bhargav	(India) Bhawanipore	
~~13~~	FW	(Trinidad and Tobago) Cornell Glen	(India) Ozone F.C.	

==== Mid-season ====
No.	Pos.	Name	Sold to	Ref.
~~1~~	GK	(India) Arnab Das Sharma	(India) Minerva Punjab	
~~31~~	GK	(India) Monotosh Ghosh	Released	
~~42~~	GK	(India) Agiapal Singh	Released	
~~4~~	DF	(India) Ashim Dey	Released	
~~5~~	DF	(India) Dhanachandra Singh	Released	
~~17~~	DF	(India) Deepak Devrani	(India) Minerva Punjab	
~~18~~	DF	(India) Avinabo Bag	Released	
~~19~~	DF	(India) Tonmoy Ghosh	Released	
~~20~~	DF	(India) Chinta Chandrashekar Rao	(India) Mumbai	
~~23~~	DF	(Afghanistan) Haroon Fakruddin	(India) Chennai City	
~~28~~	DF	(India) Abhishek Das	(India) Minerva Punjab	
~~5~~	MF	(India) Dhananjoy Yadav	Released	
~~8~~	MF	(India) Babul Biswas	Released	
~~11~~	MF	(India) Thangjam Singh	Released	
~~20~~	MF	(India) Brandon Fernandes	Churchill Brothers	
~~26~~	MF	(India) Amandeep Singh	Released	
~~27~~	MF	(India) Tapan Maity	Released	
~~34~~	MF	(India) C.L.Ruata	Released	
~~42~~	MF	(India) Lenny Rodrigues	(India) Bengaluru FC	
~~2~~	FW	(Nigeria) Daniel Bedemi	Released	
~~15~~	FW	(India) Ajay Singh	Released	
~~28~~	FW	(India) Simranjit Singh	(India) Minerva Punjab	

== Kits ==
Supplier: Shiv Naresh / Sponsors: Legion

Home	Away	Goalkeeper

== Pre-season ==
=== Overview ===
June

On 14 June 2016 Mohun Bagan announced that they would be fielding a junior side in the Calcutta Football League which would be mentored by assistant coach Sankarlal Chakraborty. The club officials also announced that they would not be fielding a side in the exhibition matches of the Calcutta Football League against East Bengal and Mohammedan due to disagreement with the IFA over television broadcast rights sharing and match-day ticket distribution.

Mohun Bagan confirmed the signing of former Salgaocar striker Darryl Duffy on 30 June 2016, striking a 1-year deal with the Scottish forward.

July

Mohun Bagan started their training for the season on 6 July 2016 under the guidance of assistant coach Sankarlal Chakraborty.

On 18 July 2016, Bagan's new striker, Darryl Duffy arrived in Kolkata and joined practice the following day. Mohun Bagan played their first practice match of the season against Peerless on 19 July 2016, where they went down 2–0 against their opponents.

On 22 July 2016, the Mariners played their second practice match of the season against a weak CFC and demolished their opponents 8–0. Star striker Darryl Duffy scored a brace and also found the back of the net for the first time in Green and Maroon colours, while other scorers included the lights of Kean Lewis, Tapan Maity (brace), Pankaj Moula, Babul Biswas, Ajay Singh.

Mohun Bagan played their 3rd practice match of the season on 27 July 2016, against Kalyani XI, at their home ground. The Mariners won 2–0 courtesy goals from Darryl Duffy and new recruit Simranjit Singh.

August

Mohun Bagan played their 4th and final practice match of the season on 2 August 2016, against premier division side Railway F.C. Darryl Duffy and Raju Gaikwad scored to give the Mariners a comfortable 2–0 victory.

On 4 August 2016, Mohun Bagan announced the signing of their second foreign recruit, English defender Danny Seaborne.

=== Matches ===
19 July 2016 Practice Match	Mohun Bagan	0–2	Peerless	Kolkata
08:30 IST		Report	Arghya 8', 34'	Stadium: Mohun Bagan Ground

22 July 2016 Practice Match	Mohun Bagan	8–0	CFC	Kolkata
08:30 IST	Duffy 26', 33'; Kean 29'; Maity 48'; Moula 52'; Babul 56'; A.Singh 60'; Tonmoy 76'	Report		Stadium: Mohun Bagan Ground

27 July 2016 Practice Match	Mohun Bagan	2–0	Kalyani XI	Kolkata
08:30 IST	Duffy 45'; Simranjit 58'	Report		Stadium: Mohun Bagan Ground

2 August 2016 Practice Match	Mohun Bagan	2–0	Railway F.C.	Kolkata
08:30 IST	Duffy 80'; Raju 83'	Report		Stadium: Mohun Bagan Ground

== Competitions ==
=== Calcutta Football League ===
==== Overview ====
August

Mohun Bagan played their first match of the season in the Calcutta Football League tie against Aryan. The Mariners got off to a brilliant start in the season as they demolished their opponents 5–1, courtesy a hat-trick from Darryl Duffy and goals each from Prabir Das and Azharuddin Mallick.

On 9 August 2016, Mohun Bagan announced the signing of midfielder Thangjam Singh from ISL team Mumbai City FC.

Mohun Bagan continued their winning run in the Calcutta football league, when they demolished George Telegraph 4–0 in their 2nd game of the season. Prabir Das was the star performer of the match scoring 2 goals while Darryl Duffy and Thangjam Singh scored the other two goals.

On 14 August 2016, the Mariners won their third consecutive match of the season propelling them to the top of the Calcutta football league standings. Bagan defeated Southern Samity courtesy the solo goal of new recruit Ajay Singh. On 16 August 2016, Mohun Bagan announced the signing of Haroon Fakruddin in place of English defender Danny Seaborne who left the club on basis of a mutual understanding.

On 17 August 2016, Mohun Bagan announced the signing of their third foreigner for the Calcutta football league as they finalised a deal with Nigerian striker Daniel Bedemi.

Mohun Bagan won their 4th consecutive match of the season on 18 August 2016, when they defeated Bhawanipore 1–0, courtesy a brilliant goal from Thangjam Singh.

The Mariners dropped their first points of the season, when they were held to a goalless draw by Peerless on 22 August 2016 in their 5th match of the season. This draw put them in 2nd position, 2 points behind arch rivals East Bengal.

Mohun Bagan were level 1–2 against Tollygunge Agragami before the match got abandoned in the 93rd minute due to crowd trouble. Mohun Bagan were denied 3 apparently legitimate goals by the assistant referee due to offside. The decisive finish by Azharuddin Mallick in the 93rd minute was ruled out due to offside by the assistant referee. This goal could have given Mohun Bagan a 2–1 lead and a possible 3 points from the match. This decision by the referee sparked controversy and a packed gallery at the Mohun Bagan ground erupted into protest. Despite much effort by the club officials and police force thereof, the match could not be restarted and was declared abandoned.

On 31 August 2016, the Indian Football Association announced a replay of the abandoned Mohun Bagan and Tollygunge Agragami match, but kept the decisions on the date, time and venue of the match as pending.

September

On 2 September 2016, Mohun Bagan finally returned to winning ways, when they defeated United 3–1 courtesy a brace from Daniel Bedemi and a solitary goal from Darryl Duffy.

On 7 Sepeteber 2016, Mohun Bagan refused to take the field in the scheduled Kolkata Derby and gave arch-rivals East Bengal a walkover, citing lack of opportunities of pre-match practice at the Kalyani Stadium. Mohun Bagan had requested the IFA to postpone the match by at least one day. The association however did not heed to this request and hence Bagan did not field a team in the match.

On 10 September 2016, Mohun Bagan came up with a brilliant performance against a depleted Army XI side, where they defeated the army men by 6–0. Daniel Bedemi stood out, scoring 4 of the goals by himself, while Darryl Duffy and Azharuddin Mallick added to Bagan's tally.

Mohun Bagan lost their first match of the season against Tollygunge Agragami on 15 September 2016. The Mariners failed to equalize after a 32nd minute Joel Sunday strike, as they went down 0–2 to the minnows.

On 18 September 2016, Mohun Bagan lost their final match of the league by 1–5 against city rivals Mohammedan. This loss meant that the Green and Maroon Brigade slipped to 3rd position in the league, while Mohammedan finished runners-up after eight long years.

Om 20 September 2016, along expected lines, the IFA announced East Bengal the winners of the abandoned derby with a score of 3–0 in their favour. The association also announced further actions against Mohun Bagan stating that it would decide after the conclusion of the league, whether to deduct another 2 points from Mohun Bagan's tally for not informing of not playing the derby. The parent body also issued show-causes to two Mohun Bagan officials for derogatory remarks against the association.

==== Matches ====
6 August 2016 1	Mohun Bagan	5–1	Aryan	Kolkata
17:30 IST	Prabir 14'; Duffy 62', 66', 73'; Azhar 77'; Tonmoy (yellow card) 19'; Maity (yellow card) 36'	Report	Kazeem 89'	Stadium: Mohun Bagan Ground; Referee: Prabir Dhar

10 August 2016 2	Mohun Bagan	4–0	George Telegraph	Kolkata
17:30 IST	Prabir 18', 37'; Duffy 61'; T.Singh 86'; Raju (yellow card) 78'	Report		Stadium: Mohun Bagan Ground; Referee: Uttam Sarkar

14 August 2016 3	Mohun Bagan	1–0	Southern Samity	Kolkata
17:30 IST	A.Singh 80'; Prabir (yellow card) 19'; Balmuchu (yellow card) 86'	Report		Stadium: Mohun Bagan Ground; Referee: Pranjal Banerjee

18 August 2016 4	Mohun Bagan	1–0	Bhawanipore	Kolkata
17:30 IST	T.Singh 7'; Fakruddin (yellow card) 68'	Report		Stadium: Mohun Bagan Ground; Referee: Ajit Dutta

22 August 2016 5	Mohun Bagan	0–0	Peerless	Kolkata
17:30 IST		Report		Stadium: Mohun Bagan Ground; Referee: Tanmoy Dhar

2 September 2016 7	Mohun Bagan	3–1	United	Kolkata
17:30 IST	Bedemi 19', 57'; Duffy 36'	Report	Tudu 22'	Stadium: Mohun Bagan Ground; Referee: Debasish Mandi

7 September 2016 8	Mohun Bagan	0–3	East Bengal	Kalyani
15:00 IST		Report		Stadium: Kalyani Stadium; Referee: Pranjal Banerjee

10 September 2016 9	Mohun Bagan	6–0	Army XI	Kolkata
17:30 IST	Bedemi 13', 53', 66', 90+3'; Duffy 60'; Azhar 79'; Tonmoy (yellow card) 77'	Report		Stadium: Mohun Bagan Ground; Referee: Arabinda Bera

15 September 2016 6	Mohun Bagan	0–1	Tollygunge Agragami	Kolkata
17:30 IST		Report	Sunday 32'	Stadium: Mohun Bagan Ground; Referee: Pranjal Banerjee

18 September 2016 10	Mohun Bagan	0–1	Mohammedan	Kalyani
14:30 IST		Report	Dedoz 61'	Stadium: Kalyani Stadium; Referee: Prabir Dhar

==== Table ====
Pos	Team	Pld	W	D	L	GF	GA	GD	Pts	Qualification or relegation
1	East Bengal (Note: East Bengal were awarded 3 points in the match against Mohun Bagan as Mohun Bagan refused to field a team for the match citing inadequate time for practice. The result of the match was declared by IFA to be 3–0 in favour of East Bengal.) (C)	10	10	0	0	19	6	+13	30	Champion
2	Mohammedan	10	6	2	2	13	7	+6	20	
3	Mohun Bagan	10	6	1	3	20	7	+13	19	
4	Southern Samity	10	4	3	3	11	8	+3	15	
5	Peerless SC	10	3	5	2	12	11	+1	14	
6	Army XI	10	4	2	4	14	16	−2	14	
7	Tollygunge Agragami	10	3	4	3	10	11	−1	13	
8	United (R)	10	3	2	5	15	15	0	11	Relegation to Premier Division B
9	Aryan (R)	10	2	3	5	7	14	−7	9	Relegation to Premier Division B
10	Bhawanipore (R)	10	1	3	6	11	14	−3	6	Relegation to Premier Division B
11	George Telegraph (R)	10	0	1	9	6	29	−23	1	Relegation to Premier Division B

Source: Soccerway
(C) Champions; (R) Relegated

=== I-League ===
==== Season overview ====
January

Mohun Bagan started off their I-League campaign on 8 January 2017 with a hard fought 1–0 win against a weak Churchill Brothers side. Balwant Singh was the lone scorer for the Mariners. Mohun Bagan continued their winning run into the 2nd match of the league, when they defeated Shillong Lajong 2–0 at home, owing to a brace from Scottish striker Darryl Duffy. The Mariners bulldozed league newcomers Minerva Punjab by a 4–0 margin, as star player, Sony Norde made his first appearance of the season. Darryl Duffy and Jeje Lalpekhlua netted in a brace each in Bagan's thumping victory over the Punjab-based side. Mohun Bagan continued their winning run in the season for the 4th consecutive match when they edged past newcomers Chennai City 2–1 in an away encounter with goals from Jeje Lalpekhlua and Sony Norde. Mohun Bagan played out their first draw against DSK Shivajians in the 5th round of the league, with the scoreline remaining at 0–0 post 90 minutes, owing to a lackluster performance from the Green and Maroon strike force.

Mohun Bagan returned to winning ways as they got their AFC Cup campaign running with a 2–1 away victory over Sri Lankan side Colombo, with Kean Lewis and Sehnaj Singh finding the back of the net for the Mariners.

February

The Mariners returned to winning ways in the I-League as they managed a hard fought 3–2 win against Aizawl at home. Darryl Duffy scored the fastest goal of the league, putting the Mariners in the lead just 70 minutes into the match. He later scored the 3rd for the team and his second of the night as he converted from the spot. Jeje Lalpekhlua scored the second goal for the Mariners aiding the victory.

Mohun Bagan continued their winning run in the AFC Cup as they defeated Colombo 2–1 in the home leg encounter at the Rabindra Sarobar Stadium. Sony Norde scored his first goal of the competition and then went onto assist Darryl Duffy for the latter's first goal of the tournament. In the late stages of the match, Colombo pulled one back, but it was too little too late, and Mohun Bagan progressed to the next round 4–2 on aggregate.

Mohun Bagan were up against arch rivals East Bengal in the 8th round of the league on 12 February. In a match marred by ultra-defensive play on both sides the Mariners shared points with their bitter rivals as the scoreline read 0–0. In the next match, the Mariners were held to a goalless draw at the Cooperage Football Stadium in an away encounter against Mumbai. Mohun Bagan finally returned to winning ways in their next match at home against DSK Shivajians when they defeated the latter 3–1 courtesy a brace from Balwant Singh, while Katsumi Yusa netted his first of the season from the spot.

The Mariners returned to the AFC Cup campaign with a 1–1 draw in an away encounter against Club Valencia. Darryl Duffy put the Green and Maroon brigade ahead in the 6th minute, while Club Valencia restored parity through a spot-kick in the 71st minute. In the return leg encounter Mohun Bagan thrashed Club Valencia 4–1, to go through to the group stage on a 5–2 aggregate. Jeje Lalpekhlua found his scoring boots as he netted in a brace, while Sony Norde scored one of the other goals.

March

The Mariners fell to their first defeat of the season when they lost 2–1 to Churchill Brothers in an away encounter. Prabir Das gave the Green and Maroon brigade the lead, only to be nullified twice in the second half. Mohun Bagan failed to return to winning ways in their home encounter against Mumbai where they played out a 2–2 draw courtesy goals from Pritam Kotal and Balwant Singh. The Mariners were up against Bengaluru FC in an I-League away encounter next, where they played out a respectable goalless draw after being brought down to 10 men, courtesy a double yellow card to Subhasish Bose.

They were up against the same opponents in the group stage encounter of the AFC Cup 3 days later at the same venue. This time around, Mohun Bagan went down 2–1 to their opponents even after taking a 1st half lead, courtesy a spot kick strike from skipper Katsumi Yusa.

April

The Green and Maroon brigade came out recharged after the international break, as they drubbed Bengaluru FC 3–0 at home, to come back strongly in the title race. The skipper Katsumi Yusa scored a brace, while the other goal was scored by Darryl Duffy.

Mohun Bagan took their winning ways into the AFC Cup group stage where they sailed past Bangladeshi club Dhaka Abahani 3–1 to register their first win in the group stage. Jeje Lalpekhlua, Balwant Singh and Sony Norde found the back of the net to give the Mariners a crucial 3 points.

On 9 April 2017, Mohun Bagan were once again up against arch-rivals East Bengal in the I-League. It was the Haitian, Sony Norde who opened the scoring for Bagan in the 36th minute, while 7 minutes later youngstar Azharuddin Mallick came up with a pitch of a strike to make it 2–0 for the Mariners. In the 2nd half, East Bengal made the job even more difficult for themselves as Willis Plaza was given the marching orders by the referee for an off the ball push on Anas Edathodika. In the late stages of injury time East Bengal did manage to pull one goal back, through Rowllin Borges, but it proved too little too late.

==== Matches ====
8 January 2017 1	Mohun Bagan	1–0	Churchill Brothers	Barasat
19:00 IST	Balwant 28'; Sehnaj (yellow card) 43'; S.Bose (yellow card) 55' (yellow-red card) 64'	Report		Stadium: Barasat Stadium; Attendance: 10,228; Referee: A.Meetei

13 January 2017 2	Mohun Bagan	2–0	Shillong Lajong	Kolkata
19:00 IST	Duffy 21', 77'; Pronay (yellow card) 84'	Report	Z.Ralte (yellow card) 54'	Stadium: Rabindra Sarobar Stadium; Attendance: 4,555; Referee: R. Arumughan

17 January 2017 3	Mohun Bagan	4–0	Minerva Punjab	Kolkata
16:30 IST	Duffy 16', 32'; Jeje 28', 77'; Eduardo (yellow card) 75'	Report	Manandeep (yellow card) 69'	Stadium: Rabindra Sarobar Stadium; Attendance: 7,551; Referee: O.Thakur

21 January 2017 4	Chennai City	1–2	Mohun Bagan	Chennai
19:00 IST	Thank 52'; Raju (yellow card) 16'; Fakruddin (yellow card) 44'	Report	Jeje 57'; Norde 77'	Stadium: Jawaharlal Nehru Stadium; Attendance: 3,500; Referee: R. Arumughan

24 January 2017 5	DSK Shivajians	0–0	Mohun Bagan	Pune
19:00 IST	Jerry (yellow card) 16'; Sairuat Kima (yellow card) 69'	Report	Pronay (yellow card) 63'	Stadium: Balewadi Sports Complex; Attendance: 1,547; Referee: P.Singh

4 February 2017 7	Mohun Bagan	3–2	Aizawl	Kolkata
19:00 IST	Duffy 2', 86' (pen.), (yellow card) 86'; Jeje 63'; S.Bose (yellow card) 57'; Prabir (yellow card) 68'	Report	Rane 41'; A.Mehta 70'; Lalruatthara (yellow card) 68'; Alfred (yellow card) 83'	Stadium: Rabindra Sarobar Stadium; Attendance: 5,222; Referee: A.Meetei

12 February 2017 8	East Bengal	0–0	Mohun Bagan	Siliguri
16:30 IST	Ralte (yellow card) 44'; Mehtab (yellow card) 67'	Report		Stadium: Kanchenjunga Stadium; Attendance: 29,067; Referee: C.R.Srikrishna

15 February 2017 9	Mumbai	0–0	Mohun Bagan	Mumbai
19:00 IST	Sharityar (yellow card) 58'; Alex (yellow card) 87'	Report	Balwant (yellow card) 60'	Stadium: Cooperage Football Stadium; Attendance: 3,126; Referee: T.Nagvenkar

18 February 2017 10	Mohun Bagan	3–1	DSK Shivajians	Kolkata
16:30 IST	Balwant 42', 44', (yellow card) 16'; Katsumi 88' (pen.); Pronay (yellow card) 72'; Prabir (yellow card) 74'	Report	Milan 33', (yellow card) 21'; Sairuat Kima (yellow card) 65'; Gouramangi (yellow card) 88'	Stadium: Rabindra Sarobar Stadium; Attendance: 3,856; Referee: R.Venkatesh

4 March 2017 12	Churchill Brothers	2–1	Mohun Bagan	Vasco
19:00 IST	Wolfe 65'; Chesterpoul 75'; Brandon (yellow card) 88'	Report	Prabir 24'; Katsumi (yellow card) 38'; Prabir (yellow card) 74'; Duffy (yellow card) 90+5'	Stadium: Tilak Maidan; Attendance: 3,927; Referee: R.Venkatesh

8 March 2017 13	Mohun Bagan	2–2	Mumbai	Kolkata
16:30 IST	Kotal 12'; Balwant Singh 89'	Report	Thoi 21'; Victorino 22'; Theobald (yellow card) 60'	Stadium: Rabindra Sarobar Stadium; Attendance: 3,256; Referee: R.Saha

11 March 2017 14	Bengaluru FC	0–0	Mohun Bagan	Bengaluru
19:00 IST	Nishu (yellow card) 27'; Jugović (yellow card) 84'; Watson (yellow card) 87'	Report	S.Bose (yellow card) 9' (yellow-red card) 68'; Katsumi (yellow card) 83'; Kotal (yellow card) 90+2'	Stadium: Sree Kanteerava Stadium; Attendance: 10,124; Referee: C.R.Srikrishna

1 April 2017 6	Mohun Bagan	3–0	Bengaluru FC	Kolkata
19:00 IST	Katsumi 14', 53'; Duffy 25'	Report	Khabra (yellow card) 81'	Stadium: Rabindra Sarobar Stadium; Attendance: 6,420; Referee: M.V.Santosh Kumar
Note: The match originally scheduled for 1 February 2017; Postponed due to 2017 AFC Champions League and 2017 AFC Cup qualifiers.

9 April 2017 15	Mohun Bagan	2–1	East Bengal	Siliguri
19:00 IST	Norde 36'; Azhar 43', (yellow card) 44'; Raju (yellow card) 17'	Report	Borges 90+2'; Plaza (red card) 66'; Gurwinder (yellow card) 71'; Payne (yellow card) 76'	Stadium: Kanchenjunga Stadium; Attendance: 23,859; Referee: R. Arumughan

12 April 2017 11	Shillong Lajong	1–1	Mohun Bagan	Shillong
19:00 IST	Dipanda 78' (pen.); Shadap (yellow card) 55'	Report	Jeje 75'; Sehnaj (yellow card) 55'	Stadium: Jawaharlal Nehru Stadium; Attendance: 6,400; Referee: O.P.Thakur
Note: The match originally scheduled for 25 February 2017; Postponed due to 2017 AFC Cup qualifiers.

15 April 2017 16	Minerva Punjab	0–1	Mohun Bagan	Ludhiana
19:00 IST	Pandit (yellow card) 62'	Report	Norde 84', (yellow card) 84'; Sehnaj (yellow card) 43'	Stadium: Guru Nanak Stadium; Attendance: 5,169; Referee: A.Meetei

22 April 2017 17	Aizawl	1–0	Mohun Bagan	Aizawl
14:00 IST	Jaryan (yellow card) 52'; Mehta (yellow card) 69'; Z.Ralte 83'	Report	Duffy (yellow card) 60'; Eduardo (yellow card) 86'; Balwant (yellow card) 90+3'	Stadium: Rajiv Gandhi Stadium; Referee: Rahul Kumar Gupta

30 April 2017 18	Mohun Bagan	2–1	Chennai City FC	Kolkata
19:00 IST	Sehnaj (yellow card) 35'; Katsumi 45+2'; Balwant (yellow card) 63'; Duffy 77'; Debjit (red card) 79'; Souvik (yellow card) 89'	Report	Nandakumar 31'; W.Vaz (yellow card) 76'	Stadium: Rabindra Sarobar Stadium; Attendance: 6,252; Referee: Tejas Viswasrao Nagvenkar

==== Table ====
Pos	Team	Pld	W	D	L	GF	GA	GD	Pts	Qualification or relegation
1	Aizawl (C)	18	11	4	3	24	14	+10	37	Qualification to Champions League qualifier
2	Mohun Bagan	18	10	6	2	27	12	+15	36	
3	East Bengal	18	10	3	5	33	15	+18	33	
4	Bengaluru	18	8	6	4	30	15	+15	30	Qualification to AFC Cup qualifying play-off (Note: Bengaluru qualified for the 2018 AFC Cup by winning the 2016–17 Federation Cup.)
5	Shillong Lajong	18	7	5	6	24	23	+1	26	

Source: IndiaFooty.com
Rules for classification: 1) points; 2) head-to-head points; 3) head-to-head goal difference; 4) goal difference; 5) number of goals scored; 6) drawing of lots
(C) Champions

==== Results by round ====
Round	1	2	3	4	5	6	7	8	9	10	11	12	13	14	15	16	17	18
Ground	H	H	H	A	A	H	H	A	A	H	A	A	H	A	H	A	A	A
Result	W	W	W	W	D	W	W	D	D	W	D	L	D	D	W	W	L	W
Position	2	2	2	1	2	3	2	2	2	2	1	3	3	3	2	1	2	2

Updated to match(es) played on 15 April 2017. Source: Matches
A = Away; H = Home; W = Win; D = Draw; L = Loss

=== AFC Cup ===
==== Preliminary round ====
31 January 2017 Leg 1	Colombo (Sri Lanka)	1–2	(India) Mohun Bagan	Colombo
15:30 SLST	Olofin 30'; Meera (yellow card) 32'; Jean Yapo (yellow card) 57'; Mohamed (yellow card) 90'	Report	Kean 13'; Sehnaj 70'; Bikramjeet (yellow card) 68'	Stadium: Race Course Ground; Attendance: 3,800; Referee: Yu Ming Hsun (Chinese Taipei)

7 February 2017 Leg 2	Mohun Bagan (India)	2–1 (4–2 agg.)	(Sri Lanka) Colombo	Kolkata
19:00 IST	Norde 28'; Duffy 56'	Report	Jean Yapo 88'	Stadium: Rabindra Sarobar Stadium; Attendance: 3,156; Referee: Ahmed Al-Ali (Jordan)

==== Play-off round ====
21 February 2017 Leg 1	Club Valencia (Maldives)	1–1	(India) Mohun Bagan	Malé
16:00 MVT	Omodu 71' (pen.); Saleem (yellow card) 33'; Visam (yellow card) 90+1'	Report	Duffy 6'	Stadium: National Football Stadium; Attendance: 850; Referee: Aziz Asimov (Uzbekistan)

28 February 2017 Leg 2	Mohun Bagan (India)	4–1 (5–2 agg.)	(Maldives) Club Valencia	Kolkata
16:00 IST	Jeje 2' (pen.), 81'; Nihan 45' (o.g.); Norde 87'; Anas (yellow card) 90+1'	Report	Omodu 52'	Stadium: Rabindra Sarobar Stadium; Attendance: 4,250; Referee: Võ Minh Trí (Vietnam)

==== Group stage ====
===== Table =====
Pos	Team	Pld	W	D	L	GF	GA	GD	Pts	Qualification	BFC	MAZ	MOH	ABD
1	(India) Bengaluru	6	4	0	2	7	6	+1	12 (Note: Head-to-head results: Maziya 0–1 Bengaluru, Bengaluru 1–0 Maziya.)	Inter-zone play-off semi-finals	—	1–0	2–1	2–0
2	(Maldives) Maziya	6	4	0	2	10	4	+6	12		0–1	—	5–2	2–0
3	(India) Mohun Bagan	6	2	1	3	10	11	−1	7		3–1	0–1	—	3–1
4	(Bangladesh) Abahani Limited Dhaka	6	1	1	4	4	10	−6	4		2–0	0–2	1–1	—

Source: AFC

===== Matches =====
14 March 2017	Bengaluru FC (India)	2–1	(India) Mohun Bagan	Bengaluru
19:00 IST	Jhingan 51' (yellow card) 36'; Chhetri 57'; Watson (yellow card) 58'; John Johnson (yellow card) 69'; Khabra (yellow card) 90+3'	Report	Katsumi 36' (pen.); Norde (yellow card) 74'	Stadium: Sree Kanteerava Stadium; Attendance: 3,692; Referee: Shukri Al-Hunfush (Saudi Arabia)

4 April 2017	Mohun Bagan (India)	3–1	(Bangladesh) Dhaka Abahani	Kolkata
19:00 IST	Jeje 45+1'; Balwant 48'; Norde 87'	Report	Brown 21'; Hasan (yellow card) 15'; Yeasin (yellow card) 89'	Stadium: Rabindra Sarobar Stadium; Attendance: 2,128; Referee: Mohammad Abu Loum (Jordan)

18 April 2017	Mohun Bagan (India)	0–1	(Maldives) Maziya	Kolkata
19:00 IST	Bikramjit (yellow card) 55'	Report	Umair 34'; Kovačević (yellow card) 83' (yellow-red card) 85'	Stadium: Rabindra Sarobar Stadium; Attendance: 1,842; Referee: Võ Minh Trí (Vietnam)

3 May 2017	Maziya (Maldives)	5–2	(India) Mohun Bagan	Malé
16:00 MVT	Habeeb 13'; Umair 27'; Rakić 45', 60'; Abdulla 55' (pen.)	Report	Debnath 48'; Lalpekhlua 78' (pen.)	Stadium: National Football Stadium; Attendance: 200; Referee: Dmitry Mashentsev (Kyrgyzstan)

17 May 2017	Mohun Bagan (India)	3–1	(India) Bengaluru FC	Kolkata
19:00 IST	Lalpekhlua 9'; Lewis 74'; Bi. Singh 80'	Report	Doungel 52'; Gill (yellow card) 87'	Stadium: Rabindra Sarobar Stadium; Attendance: 1,298; Referee: Ammar Mahfoodh (Bahrain)

31 May 2017	Dhaka Abahani (Bangladesh)	1–1	(India) Mohun Bagan	Dhaka
19:45 BDT	Onuoha 8'; Miah (yellow card) 63'	Report	Yusa (yellow card) 19' (goal) 83' (pen.); Bikramjit (yellow card) 46'	Stadium: Bangabandhu National Stadium; Attendance: 800; Referee: Sukhbir Singh (Singapore)

=== Federation Cup ===
==== Group stage ====
Group B

Pos	Team	Pld	W	D	L	GF	GA	GD	Pts	Qualification
1	Mohun Bagan	3	2	1	0	8	3	+5	7	Advance to semi-finals
2	Bengaluru FC	3	1	1	1	4	5	−1	4	Advance to semi-finals
3	Shillong Lajong	3	1	0	2	7	8	−1	3	
4	DSK Shivajians	3	1	0	2	4	7	−3	3	

Source: AIFF

==== Semifinal ====
14 May 2017	Mohun Bagan	2–0	East Bengal	Cuttack
19:00 IST	Duffy 35'; B.Singh 84'	Report		Stadium: Barabati Stadium; Man of the Match: Debjit Majumder (Mohun Bagan)

==== Final ====
21 May 2017	Bengaluru FC	2–0 (a.e.t.)	Mohun Bagan	Cuttack
19:00 IST	Khabra (yellow card) 10'; Lyngdoh (yellow card) 13'; Vineeth 107', 119'	Report	Norde (yellow card) 10'; Sehnaj (yellow card) 79'; Kotal (yellow card) 100'	Stadium: Barabati Stadium; Referee: C.R. Srikrishna; Man of the Match: Amrinder Singh (Bengaluru FC)

== Squad ==
Squad No.	Name	Nationality	Position	Date of birth (age)
Goalkeepers
1	Pawan Kumar	(India)	GK	1 July 1990 (age 36)
22	Shilton Pal	(India)	GK	20 December 1987 (age 38)
24	Debjit Majumder	(India)	GK	6 March 1988 (age 38)
42	Shibinraj K	(India)	GK	20 March 1993 (age 33)
Defenders
2	Sarthak Golui	(India)	DF	3 November 1997 (age 29)
3	Raju Gaikwad	(India)	DF	25 August 1990 (age 36)
4	Kingshuk Debnath	(India)	DF	8 May 1985 (age 41)
14	Eduardo Ferreira	(Equatorial Guinea)	DF	8 October 1983 (age 43)
17	Subhasish Bose	(India)	DF	18 August 1995 (age 31)
20	Pritam Kotal	(India)	DF	9 August 1993 (age 33)
21	Sanjay Balmuchu	(India)	DF	5 January 1992 (age 34)
25	Bikramjeet Singh	(India)	DF	6 May 1993 (age 33)
26	Shouvik Ghosh (loaned from North East United)	(India)	DF	5 November 1992 (age 34)
33	Prabir Das	(India)	DF	20 December 1993 (age 32)
45	Anas Edathodika	(India)	DF	15 February 1987 (age 39)
Midfielders
6	Bikramjit Singh	(India)	MF	15 October 1992 (age 34)
8	Kean Lewis	(India)	MF	19 September 1992 (age 34)
10	Katsumi Yusa (captain)	(Japan)	MF	2 August 1988 (age 38)
11	Pronay Halder	(India)	MF	25 February 1993 (age 33)
13	Sourav Das	(India)	MF	20 June 1996 (age 30)
16	Sony Norde	(Haiti)	MF	27 July 1989 (age 37)
23	Souvik Chakraborty	(India)	MF	12 July 1991 (age 35)
27	Pintu Mahata	(India)	MF	—
28	Sehnaj Singh	(India)	MF	29 July 1993 (age 33)
29	Raynier Fernandes	(India)	MF	19 February 1996 (age 30)
30	Pankaj Moula	(India)	MF	20 December 1992 (age 33)
32	Robinson Singh	(India)	MF	3 February 1997 (age 29)
Forwards
9	Darryl Duffy	(Scotland)	FW	16 April 1984 (age 42)
12	Jeje Lalpekhlua	(India)	FW	7 January 1991 (age 35)
15	Balwant Singh	(India)	FW	15 December 1986 (age 39)
35	Azharuddin Mallick	(India)	FW	11 July 1997 (age 29)

Last updated: 1 April 2017
Source: mohunbaganac.com

== Technical Staff ==
Position	Name
Chief coach	(India) Sanjoy Sen
Assistant coach	(India) Sankarlal Chakraborty
Goalkeeping coach	(India) Arpan Dey
Physical Trainer	(Brazil) Djair Miranda Garcia
Physiotherapist	(India) Abhinandan Chatterjee
Club Doctor	(India) Dr. Protim Ray
Team Manager	(India) Satyajit Chatterjee

Source: mohunbaganac.com

== Player statistics ==
=== Appearances and goals ===
No.	Pos	Nat	Player	Total		CFL		I-League		AFC Cup	
No.	Pos	Nat	Player	Apps	Goals	Apps	Goals	Apps	Goals	Apps	Goals
1	GK	(India) IND	Pawan Kumar	0	0	0+0	0	0+0	0	0+0	0
22	GK	(India) IND	Shilton Pal	7	0	0+0	0	1+2	0	4+0	0
24	GK	(India) IND	Debjit Majumder	15	0	0+0	0	13+0	0	2+0	0
42	GK	(India) IND	Shibinraj K	0	0	0+0	0	0+0	0	0+0	0
~~1~~	GK	(India) IND	Arnab Das Sharma	9	0	9+0	0	0+0	0	0+0	0
~~31~~	GK	(India) IND	Monotosh Ghosh	0	0	0+0	0	0+0	0	0+0	0
~~42~~	GK	(India) IND	Agiapal Singh	0	0	0+0	0	0+0	0	0+0	0
2	DF	(India) IND	Sarthak Golui	8	0	6+0	0	0+0	0	2+0	0
3	DF	(India) IND	Raju Gaikwad	10	0	7+0	0	2+0	0	1+0	0
4	DF	(India) IND	Kingshuk Debnath	4	0	0+0	0	3+0	0	1+0	0
14	DF	(Equatorial Guinea) GEQ	Eduardo Ferreira	15	0	0+0	0	11+0	0	4+0	0
17	DF	(India) IND	Subhasish Bose	14	0	0+0	0	10+0	0	3+1	0
20	DF	(India) IND	Pritam Kotal	16	1	0+0	0	14+0	1	2+0	0
21	DF	(India) IND	Sanjay Balmuchu	6	0	6+0	0	0+0	0	0+0	0
25	DF	(India) IND	Bikramjeet Singh	12	0	2+4	0	2+1	0	2+1	0
26	DF	(India) IND	Shouvik Ghosh (loaned from North East United)	5	0	0+0	0	2+0	0	3+0	0
33	DF	(India) IND	Prabir Das	22	4	6+0	3	2+9	1	3+2	0
45	DF	(India) IND	Anas Edathodika	18	0	0+0	0	12+1	0	5+0	0
~~4~~	DF	(India) IND	Ashim Dey	4	0	3+1	0	0+0	0	0+0	0
~~17~~	DF	(India) IND	Deepak Devrani	1	0	1+0	0	0+0	0	0+0	0
~~18~~	DF	(India) IND	Avinabo Bag	0	0	0+0	0	0+0	0	0+0	0
~~19~~	DF	(India) IND	Tonmoy Ghosh	8	0	7+1	0	0+0	0	0+0	0
~~20~~	DF	(India) IND	Chinta Chandrashekar Rao	5	0	4+1	0	0+0	0	0+0	0
~~23~~	DF	(Afghanistan) AFG	Haroon Fakruddin	4	0	0+4	0	0+0	0	0+0	0
6	MF	(India) IND	Bikramjit Singh	14	0	0+0	0	3+6	0	5+0	0
8	MF	(India) IND	Kean Lewis	2	1	0+0	0	1+0	0	1+0	1
10	MF	(Japan) JPN	Katsumi Yusa	20	4	0+0	0	14+0	3	5+1	1
11	MF	(India) IND	Pronay Halder	10	0	0+0	0	6+3	0	1+0	0
13	MF	(India) IND	Sourav Das	4	0	0+2	0	0+0	0	0+2	0
16	MF	(Haiti) HAI	Sony Norde	15	5	0+0	0	11+0	2	4+0	3
23	MF	(India) IND	Souvik Chakraborty	15	0	0+0	0	9+2	0	3+1	0
27	MF	(India) IND	Pintu Mahata	1	0	0+0	0	0+1	0	0+0	0
28	MF	(India) IND	Sehnaj Singh	12	1	0+0	0	7+1	0	3+1	1
29	MF	(India) IND	Raynier Fernandes	5	0	1+1	0	1+0	0	1+1	0
30	MF	(India) IND	Pankaj Moula	7	0	6+0	0	0+0	0	0+1	0
32	MF	(India) IND	Robinson Singh	6	0	4+1	0	0+0	0	0+1	0
~~5~~	MF	(India) IND	Dhananjoy Yadav	0	0	0+0	0	0+0	0	0+0	0
~~8~~	MF	(India) IND	Babul Biswas	0	0	0+0	0	0+0	0	0+0	0
~~11~~	MF	(India) IND	Thangjam Singh	8	2	7+1	2	0+0	0	0+0	0
~~26~~	MF	(India) IND	Amandeep Singh	2	0	1+1	0	0+0	0	0+0	0
~~27~~	MF	(India) IND	Tapan Maity	8	0	7+1	0	0+0	0	0+0	0
9	FW	(Scotland) SCO	Darryl Duffy	25	15	9+0	6	13+0	7	3+0	2
12	FW	(India) IND	Jeje Lalpekhlua	17	7	0+0	0	7+5	4	4+1	3
15	FW	(India) IND	Balwant Singh	18	5	0+0	0	6+6	4	4+2	1
35	FW	(India) IND	Azharuddin Mallick	14	3	9+0	2	3+0	1	0+2	0
~~2~~	FW	(Nigeria) NGR	Daniel Bedemi	5	6	4+1	6	0+0	0	0+0	0
~~15~~	FW	(India) IND	Ajay Singh	7	1	0+7	1	0+0	0	0+0	0
~~28~~	FW	(India) IND	Simranjit Singh	0	0	0+0	0	0+0	0	0+0	0

- Source: mohunbaganac.com

Last Updated: 9 April 2017
Apps: (Matches Started)+(Substitute Appearances)

=== Top scorers ===
Rank	No.	Pos	Nat	Player	I-League	AFC	Federation Cup	Total
1	9	FW	(Scotland)	Darryl Duffy	8	2	3	13
2	11	FW	(India)	Jeje Lalpekhlua	5	4	1	10
3	15	FW	(India)	Balwant Singh	4	1	3	8
3	16	MF	(Haiti)	Sony Norde	3	3	2	8
5	10	MF	(Japan)	Katsumi Yusa	4	2	1	7
6	8	MF	(India)	Kean Lewis	0	2	0	2
7	4	DF	(India)	Kingshuk Debnath	0	1	0	1
7	6	MF	(India)	Bikramjit Singh	0	1	0	1
7	20	DF	(India)	Pritam Kotal	1	0	0	1
7	28	MF	(India)	Sehnaj Singh	0	1	0	1
7	33	DF	(India)	Prabir Das	1	0	0	1
7	35	FW	(India)	Azharuddin Mallick	1	0	0	1
TOTALS					27	17	10	54

Source: soccerway
Updated: 31 May 2017

=== Disciplinary record ===
No.	Pos.	Nat.	Player	CFL			I-League			AFC Cup			Total			Notes
No.	Pos.	Nat.	Player	Yellow card	(yellow card) (yellow-red card)	Red card	Yellow card	(yellow card) (yellow-red card)	Red card	Yellow card	(yellow card) (yellow-red card)	Red card	Yellow card	(yellow card) (yellow-red card)	Red card	Notes
17	DF	(India)	Subhasish Bose	0	0	0	1	2	0	0	0	0	1	2	0	Missed Match: vs Shillong Lajong (13 January 2017); Missed Match: vs Bengaluru FC (1 April 2017)
33	DF	(India)	Prabir Das	1	0	0	3	0	0	0	0	0	4	0	0	
11	MF	(India)	Pronay Halder	0	0	0	3	0	0	0	0	0	3	0	0	
9	FW	(Scotland)	Darryl Duffy	0	0	0	2	0	0	0	0	0	2	0	0	
15	FW	(India)	Balwant Singh	0	0	0	2	0	0	0	0	0	2	0	0	
10	MF	(Japan)	Katsumi Yusa	0	0	0	2	0	0	0	0	0	2	0	0	
3	DF	(India)	Raju Gaikwad	1	0	0	1	0	0	0	0	0	2	0	0	
~~19~~	DF	(India)	Tonmoy Ghosh	2	0	0	0	0	0	0	0	0	2	0	0	Missed Match: vs Tollygunge Agragami (15 September 2016)
35	FW	(India)	Azharuddin Mallick	0	0	0	1	0	0	0	0	0	1	0	0	
16	MF	(Haiti)	Sony Norde	0	0	0	0	0	0	1	0	0	1	0	0	
28	MF	(India)	Sehnaj Singh	0	0	0	1	0	0	0	0	0	1	0	0	
14	DF	(Equatorial Guinea)	Eduardo Ferreira	0	0	0	1	0	0	0	0	0	1	0	0	
20	DF	(India)	Pritam Kotal	0	0	0	1	0	0	0	0	0	1	0	0	
21	DF	(India)	Sanjay Balmuchu	1	0	0	0	0	0	0	0	0	1	0	0	
25	DF	(India)	Bikramjeet Singh	0	0	0	0	0	0	1	0	0	1	0	0	
45	DF	(India)	Anas Edathodika	0	0	0	0	0	0	1	0	0	1	0	0	
~~27~~	MF	(India)	Tapan Maity	1	0	0	0	0	0	0	0	0	1	0	0	
~~23~~	DF	(Afghanistan)	Haroon Fakruddin	1	0	0	0	0	0	0	0	0	1	0	0	

Last updated: 9 April 2017
Source: Matches
