= Jason Hart =

Jason Hart may refer to:

- Jason Hart (baseball) (born 1977), American baseball player
- Jason Hart (basketball) (born 1978), American basketball player
- Jason Hart, fictional character, appearing as the superhero Protector
- Jay Hart (footballer) (born 1990), English footballer
- Jason Hart (jockey), Scottish jockey
- Jason Hart (racing driver) (born 1976), American racing driver
