= Ademollo =

Ademollo is an Italian surname. Notable people with the surname include:

- Carlo Ademollo (1824–1911), Italian painter, nephew of Luigi
- Luigi Ademollo (1764–1849), Italian painter

== See also ==
- Ademola
