= Lalchhawnkima =

Indian footballer

Personal information
- Date of birth: 31 May 1991 (age 35)
- Place of birth: Champhai, Mizoram, India
- Height: 1.80 m (5 ft 11 in)
- Position: Centre-back

Team information
- Current team: Aizawl
- Number: 13

Youth career
- Mizoram

Senior career*
Years	Team	Apps	(Gls)
2014–2015	Royal Wahingdoh	20	(0)
2015	→ ATK (loan)	0	(0)
2016	Aizawl	12	(1)
2016	Delhi Dynamos	12	(0)
2017	Mumbai	6	(0)
2017–2018	Mumbai City		
2018	→ Aizawl (loan)	4	(0)
2018–2020	Mohun Bagan	15	(1)
2021–2022	Real Kashmir	12	(1)
2022–2023	Aizawl	20	(1)
2023	Bhawanipore		
2023–	Aizawl	16	(0)
- * Club domestic league appearances and goals

Lalchhawnkima (born 31 May 1991) is an Indian professional footballer who plays as a defender for I-League club Aizawl.

== Career ==
Born in Mizoram, Lalchhawnkima played his youth football with his home state, Mizoram.

=== Royal Wahingdoh ===
He then joined Royal Wahingdoh and participated in the Shillong Premier League and the I-League 2nd Division with the Shillong side. Lalchhawnkima made his professional debut for Royal Wahingdoh on 28 December 2014 in the Federation Cup against Mumbai.

=== Atletico de Kolkata ===
In July 2015 Lalchhawnkima was drafted to play for Atlético de Kolkata in the 2015 Indian Super League. In pre season in Spain it was reported that Lalchhawnkima had contracted a hamstring injury, which sidelined him the whole 2015 ISL season.

=== Aizawl ===
On 5 January 2016, Lalchhawnkima signed for newly promoted side Aizawl FC for 1 season. He played important role in defence in whole I-League season for Aizawl FC.

=== Delhi Dynamos ===
On 24 July 2016, Delhi Dynamos has announced that Lalchhawnkima has signed on dotted lines for the third season of Hero ISL.

=== Mumbai FC ===
Lalchhawnkima signed for Mumbai FC for the I-League 2016–17 season.

=== Mumbai City FC ===
On 23 July 2017, Kima has been picked up by Mumbai City FC for 2017-18 Hero ISL season.

== Career statistics ==
=== Club ===
As of 5 April 2024

Club	Season	League			Cup		AFC		Total	
Club	Season	Division	Apps	Goals	Apps	Goals	Apps	Goals	Apps	Goals
Royal Wahingdoh	2014–15	I-League	20	0	1 (Note: Appearance(s) in Federation Cup)	0	—		21	0
ATK (loan)	2015	Indian Super League	0	0	0	0	—		0	0
Aizawl	2015–16	I-League	12	1	1	0	—		13	1
Delhi Dynamos	2016	Indian Super League	12	0	0	0	—		12	0
Mumbai	2016–17	I-League	6	0	0	0	—		6	0
Mumbai City	2017–18	Indian Super League	0	0	0	0	—		0	0
Aizawl (loan)	2017–18	I-League	4	0	2 (Note: Appearance(s) in Super Cup)	0	—		6	0
Mohun Bagan	2018–19	I-League	15	1	0	0	—		15	1
Mohun Bagan	2019–20	I-League	0	0	3 (Note: Appearance(s) in Durand Cup)	0	—		3	0
Mohun Bagan	Mohun Bagan total		15	1	3	0	0	0	18	1
Real Kashmir	2021–22	I-League	12	1	0	0	—		12	1
Aizawl	2022–23	I-League	20	1	4	0	—		24	1
Aizawl	2023–24	I-League	16	0	0	0	—		16	0
Career total			117	4	11	0	0	0	128	4

== Honours ==
=== Club ===
Mohun Bagan

- Calcutta Football League (1): 2018–19

Real Kashmir

- IFA Shield: 2021
