= Ademola =

- Gender: Male
- Language: Yoruba

Origin
- Meaning: The crown or royalty along with prestige and wealth
- Region of origin: South western Nigeria

Adémọ́lá audio is both a given name and a surname of Yoruba origin, meaning "the crown or royalty along with prestige and wealth". Notable people with the name include:

== Given name ==
- Ademola Adebise, Nigerian bank executive, former managing director of Wema Bank Plc
- Ademola Adeleke (born 1960), Nigerian politician, businessman, governor of Osun State
- Ayoade Ademola Adeseun (born 1953), Nigerian politician who was elected Senator for Oyo Central in 2011
- Ademola Adeshina (born 1964), Nigeria international football midfielder
- Fatiu Ademola Akesode (1940–2001), Nigerian professor of paediatrics, former vice chancellor of Lagos State University
- Ademola Bankole (born 1969), Nigerian professional footballer born in Lagos
- Oba Saheed Ademola Elegushi (born 1976), Nigerian monarch, the 21st Elegushi of the Ikate-Elegushi Kingdom
- Danjuma Ademola Kuti (born 1998), Nigerian professional footballer
- Ademola Lookman (born 1997), English professional footballer
- Ademola Olugebefola (born 1941), American visual artist, designer, businessperson
- Ademola Okulaja (born 1975), German professional basketball player
- Ademola Rasaq Seriki (born 1959), Lagos Island born Nigerian politician, teacher, businessman, accountant and public administrator

== Surname ==
- Adetokunbo Ademola (1906–1993), Nigerian jurist and son of the paramount ruler of Abeokuta, Western Nigeria
- Allwell Ademola (1982–2025), Nigerian actress
- Felix Ademola (born 1974), Nigerian footballer
- Frances Ademola, Ghanaian artist, gallerist and former broadcaster
- Hezekiah Ademola Oluwafemi (1919–1983), Nigerian academic, Vice Chancellor of Obafemi Awolowo University from 1966 to 1974
- Kofoworola Ademola (1913–2002), Nigerian educationist, president of the National Council of Women's Societies in Nigeria
- Ladapo Ademola (1872–1962), also known as Ademola II, the Alake of Abeokuta from 1920 to 1962
- Moses Ademola (born 1989), English professional footballer
- Muyiwa Ademola (born 1971), Nigerian actor
- Omo-Oba Adenrele Ademola (born 1916), Nigerian princess and nurse
