= Chinta Chandrashekar Rao =

Indian footballer (born 1988)

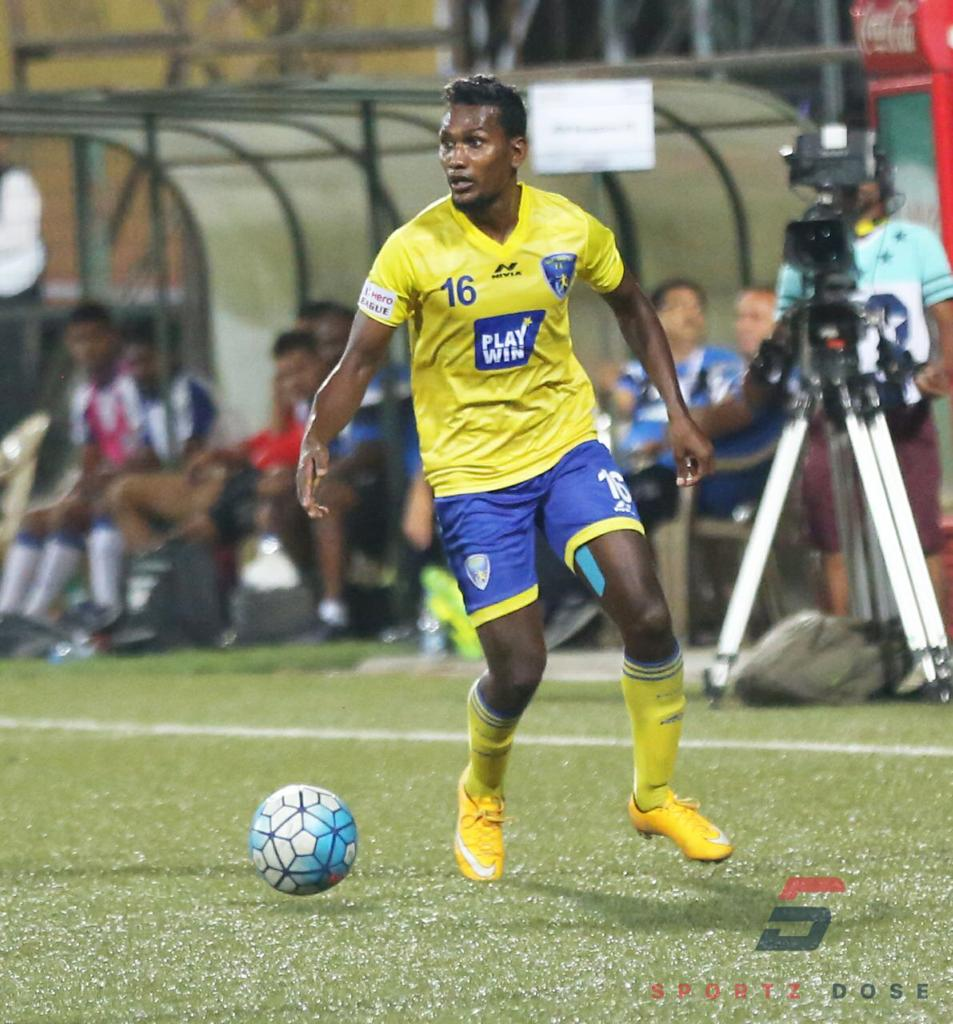

Personal information
- Full name: Chinta Chandrashekar Rao
- Date of birth: 25 September 1988 (age 38)
- Positions: Defensive midfielder; defender

Team information
- Current team: Malappuram (assistant coach)

Youth career
- 2004–2006: Tata Football Academy

Senior career*
Years	Team	Apps	(Gls)
2010–2011	Salgaocar	32	(2)
2011–2013	Chirag United Kerala	38	(4)
2012–2013	Prayag United	42	(4)
2013–2014	Mumbai Tigers	32	(4)
2014–2017	Sporting Goa (loan)	118	(8)
2017–2018	Mumbai FC	32	(4)
2018–2019	Ozone	34	(4)
2019–2020	George Telegraph	38	(4)

International career
2003–2004	India u17	12	(2)

Managerial career
- 2019–2022: Bangalore Eagles FC
- 2022–2026: Sporting Bengaluru
- 2026: Kerala Blasters (assistant coach)
- 2026–: Malappuram (assistant coach)
- * Club domestic league appearances and goals

Chinta Chandrashekar Rao (born September 25, 1988) is an Indian football coach and former professional footballer. He is currently serving as an assistant coach for the Super League Kerala club Malappuram. He also won back-to-back promotion from the I-League 3 and the I-League 2 for Sporting Club Bengaluru.

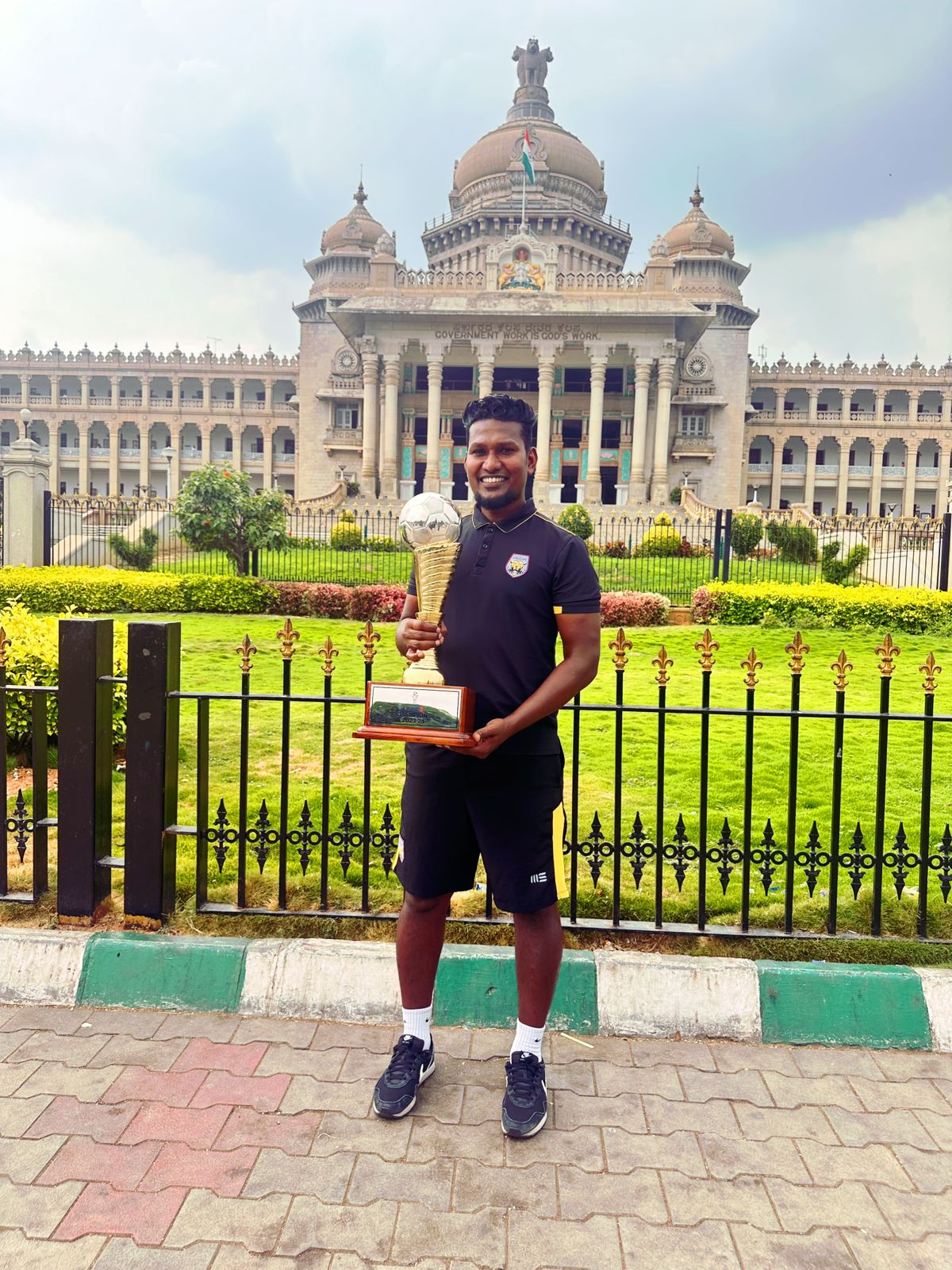
Chinta Rao with the I-League 2 Trophy in Bengaluru

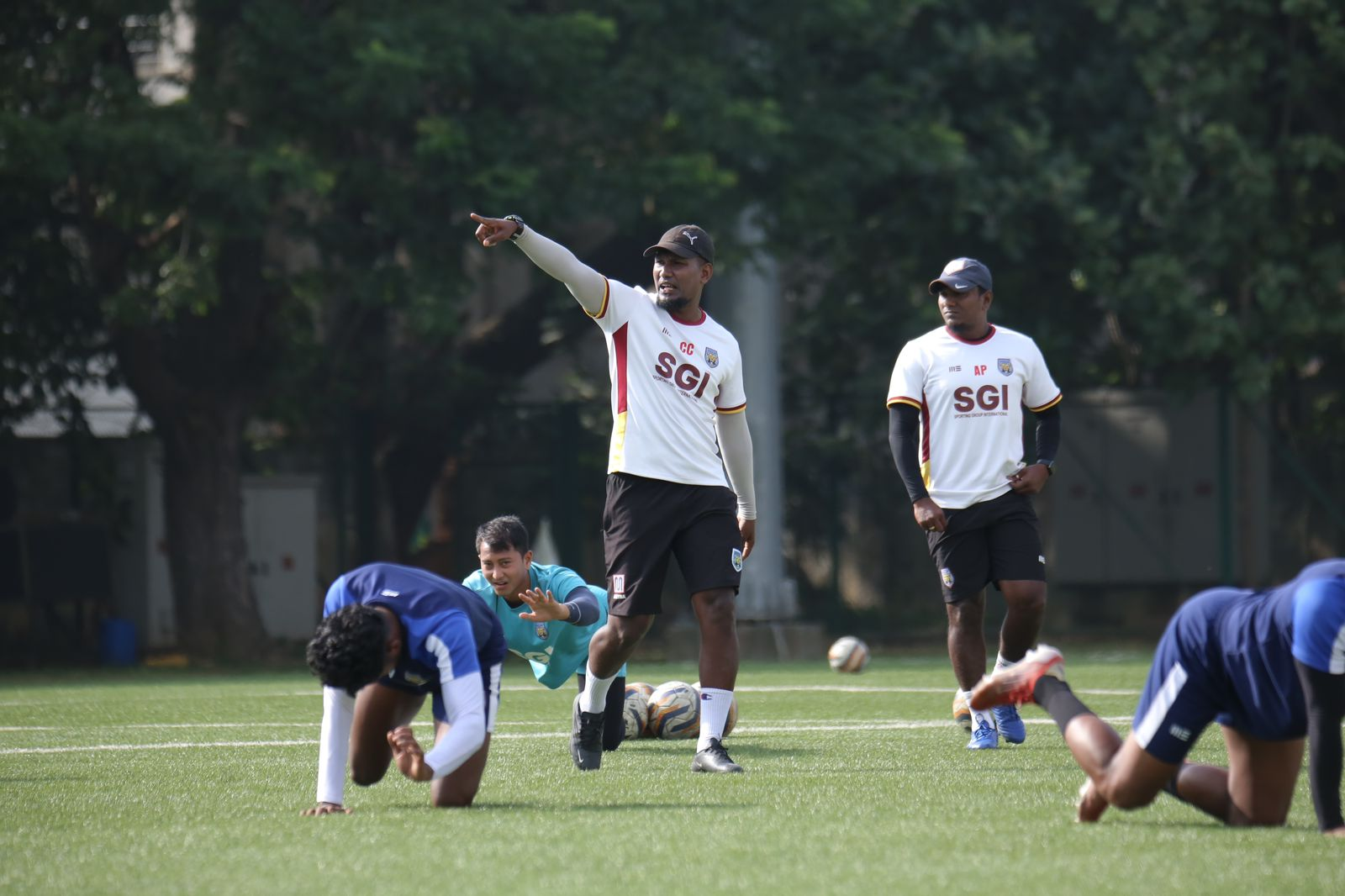
Chinta Rao during training session with Sporting Club Bengaluru
