= Shankar Roy =

Bangladeshi musician and write

- শঙ্কর রায়
- Occupations: musician and writer

Shankar Roy is a Bangladeshi musician and writer. In recognition of his contribution to music, the government of Bangladesh awarded him the country's second highest civilian award Ekushey Padak in 2020.

== Books ==
Some of his books on music includes:

- Shreshtha Sangeet Songroho
- Rabindra Sangeet Swaralipi
- Shreshtha Sangeet Swaralipi
- Shersto Adhunik Ganer Swaralipi
- Prathomik Ragmala
- rag Minoti
