= Amandeep Singh (footballer) =

Indian footballer

Amandeep singh
Personal information
- Full name: Amandeep Singh
- Date of birth: 8 March 1988 (age 38)
- Place of birth: India
- Position: Goalkeeper

Team information
- Current team: Punjab FC
- Number: 16

Senior career*
Years	Team	Apps	(Gls)
- Tollygunge Agragami
- JCT
2012–	Churchill Brothers	5	(0)
- * Club domestic league appearances and goals

Amandeep Singh (born 8 March 1988) is an Indian footballer who plays as a goalkeeper for Punjab FC in the I-League.

== Career ==
=== Churchill Brothers ===
Singh made his debut for Churchill Brothers S.C. on 22 September 2012 during a Federation Cup match against Mohammedan at the Kanchenjunga Stadium in Siliguri, West Bengal in which he started the match as Churchill Brothers won the match 1–5.

== Career statistics ==
=== Club ===
Statistics accurate as of 12 May 2013

Club	Season	League		Federation Cup		Durand Cup		AFC		Total	
Club	Season	Apps	Goals	Apps	Goals	Apps	Goals	Apps	Goals	Apps	Goals
Churchill Brothers	2012–13	5	0	2	0	0	0	2	0	9	0
Career total		5	0	2	0	0	0	2	0	9	0
