= Bikramjeet Singh =

Indian footballer (born 1993)

Bikramjit Singh
Personal information
- Date of birth: 5 May 1993 (age 33)
- Place of birth: Hoshiarpur, Punjab, India
- Height: 1.80 m (5 ft 11 in)
- Position: Defender

Team information
- Current team: Diamond Harbour
- Number: 25

Youth career
- Paldi Football Academy

Senior career*
Years	Team	Apps	(Gls)
2011–2012	Pailan Arrows	7	(0)
2012–2013	→ DSK Shivajians (loan)		
2014–2015	Bharat	2	(0)
2015–2016	Mohammedan	4	(0)
2016–2018	Mohan Bagan	3	(0)
2018–2019	Mumbai City	0	(0)
2019	→ Mohan Bagan (loan)	3	(1)
2019–2020	Mohan Bagan	0	(0)
2020–2021	Bhawanipore	1	(0)
2021	Doaba United		
2021–2022	Friends United		
2022	FC Areacode		
2022–	Diamond Harbour	1	(0)

International career^{‡}
2010–2011	India U19	5	(0)
2015–	India U23	7	(0)
- * Club domestic league appearances and goals as of 18:30, 15 July 2023 (UTC) ‡ National team caps and goals as of 08:53, 1 April 2015 (UTC)

Bikramjit Singh (born 6 May 1993) is an Indian professional footballer who plays as a defender for Calcutta Football League club Diamond Harbour.

== Career ==
After graduating from Paldi Football Academy, Bikramjeet Singh joined I-League developmental side Pailan Arrows for the 2011–12 season. For the 2012–13 season, he went out on loan to second division side DSK Shivajians, playing in the I-League 2nd Division.

=== Bharat ===
In December 2014, Bikramjeet joined newly founded I-League team Bharat FC.

== International ==
Bikramjeet made his Indian U23 debut against Uzbekistan U23 on 27 March 2015 in a 2016 AFC U-23 qualifier in the Bangabandhu National Stadium in Bangladesh.

== Career statistics ==
=== Club ===
As of 16 October 2020

Club	Season	League			National Cup		League Cup		AFC		Total	
Club	Season	Division	Apps	Goals	Apps	Goals	Apps	Goals	Apps	Goals	Apps	Goals
Pailan Arrows	2011–12	I-League	7	0	0	0	–		–		7	0
Bharat	2014–15	I-League	2	0	0	0	–		–		2	0
Mohammedan	2015–16	I-League 2nd Division	4	0	–		–		–		4	0
Mohan Bagan	2016–17	I-League	3	0	2 (Note: Appearance(s) in Federation Cup)	0	–		7 (Note: Appearance(s) in AFC Cup)	0	12	0
Mohan Bagan	2017–18	I-League	0	0	0	0	–		–		0	0
Mohan Bagan	Total		3	0	2	0	0	0	7	0	12	0
Mumbai City	2018–19	Indian Super League	0	0	0	0	–		–		0	0
Mohan Bagan (loan)	2018–19	I-League	3	1	0	0	–		–		3	1
Bhawanipore	2019–20	I-League 2nd Division	1	0	–		–		–		1	0
Career total			20	1	2	0	0	0	7	0	29	1

== Honours ==
Bhawanipore

- Naihati Gold Cup: 2022
- CFL Premier Division A runner-up: 2022
