= Omar Elhussieny =

Egyptian footballer (born 1985)

Personal information
- Full name: Omar Nabil Rashad Elhussieny
- Date of birth: 3 November 1985 (age 40)
- Place of birth: Giza, Egypt
- Height: 1.75 m (5 ft 9 in)
- Position: Attacking midfielder

Youth career
- Eastern Company

Senior career*
Years	Team	Apps	(Gls)
2010–12	Eastern Company	0	(0)
2012–2014	Kahrabaa Ismailia SC	0	(0)
2014–2015	FC Levadia Tallinn	73	(22)
2016	Persela Lamongan	10	(9)
2016	Paide Linnameeskond	19	(15)
2017–2018	Zejtun Corinthians	13	(13)
2018–2019	Mohun Bagan	18	(1)
- * Club domestic league appearances and goals as of 1 August 2018

Omar Elhussieny (born 3 November 1985) is an Egyptian former professional footballer who played as an attacking midfielder and could also play as a striker or a winger.

Elhussieny won all trophies in Estonia being crowned with FC Levadia Tallinn in 2014 with the titles of Meistriliiga, Estonian Cup and Estonian Super Cup.

== Career ==
Elhussieny featured for Levadia in edition of UEFA Champions League scoring 1 goal and assisting twice in 5 appearances.

On 5 October 2018, Elhussieny switched to Mohun Bagan. On 4 March 2019, Elhussieny released from Mohun Bagan.
