= Ricardo Cardozo =

Indian footballer

Personal information
- Date of birth: 14 January 1993 (age 33)
- Place of birth: Taleigao Bardez, Goa, India

Team information
- Current team: Mohun Bagan
- Number: 31

Ricardo Cardozo (born 14 January 1993) is an Indian footballer who plays as a goalkeeper for Mohun Bagan in the I-League.

== Career statistics ==
Club	Season	League			Federation Cup		Durand Cup		AFC		Total	
Club	Season	Division	Apps	Goals	Apps	Goals	Apps	Goals	Apps	Goals	Apps	Goals
Dempo S.C.	2008–09 I-League	I-League	1	0	0	0	0	0	0	0	0	0
Sporting Clube de Goa	2009–10 I-League	I-League	1	0	0	0	0	0	0	0	0	0
Bengaluru FC	2013	Indian Super League	3	0	0	0	0	0	0	0	0	0
Bengaluru FC	2014	Indian Super League	2	0	0	0	0	0	0	0	0	0
Bengaluru FC	2015	Indian Super League	6	0	0	0	0	0	0	0	0	0
Mumbai City FC	2016	Indian Super League	2	0	0	0	0	0	0	0	0	0
Churchill Brothers S.C.	2017	Indian Super League	3	0	0	0	0	0	0	0	0	0
Mohun Bagan A.C.	2017–18 I-League	I-League	0	0	0	0	0	0	0	0	0	0
Career total			18	0	0	0	0	0	0	0	0	0

== Honours ==
Mohun Bagan

- Calcutta Football League (1): 2018–19

India U20 (Goa India)

- Lusofonia Games Gold medal: 2014
