= Danjuma Ademola Kuti =

Nigerian footballer (born 1998)

Ademola Kuti
Personal information
- Full name: Danjuma Ademola Kuti
- Date of birth: June 25, 1998 (age 28)
- Place of birth: Lagos, Nigeria
- Height: 1.93 m (6 ft 4 in)
- Position: Forward

Team information
- Current team: S.V.Transvaal

Senior career*
Years	Team	Apps	(Gls)
2017	Lobi Stars F.C.	3	(01)
2018–2019	Fujairah	22	(18)
2019–2020	Punjab F.C.	14	(02)
2020–	Accra Hearts of Oak		
- * Club domestic league appearances and goals

Danjuma Ademola Kuti (born June 25, 1998) is a Nigerian professional footballer who plays as a forward for S.V. Transvaal, a Surinamese Professional Football AssociationClub.

== Sources ==
- Maradona declares interest in Nigerian striker, Danjuma Ademola
- Nigerian Striker Wanted By Maradona | INNONEWS.COM.NG
- Hearts of Oak complete signing of Niger international Danjuma Kuti
- Hearts of Oak targets six players for second round; Check them - Kickgh.com
- https://www.srherald.com/sport/2025/11/23/transvaal-strikt-nigeriaanse-spits/
