= Jay Hart (footballer) =

English professional footballer

Personal information
- Full name: Jason Stewart Hart
- Date of birth: 5 September 1990 (age 36)
- Place of birth: Oswaldtwistle, England
- Position: Forward

Youth career
- Blackburn Rovers

Senior career*
Years	Team	Apps	(Gls)
2009-2011	Rossendale United		
2011	Radcliffe Borough	8	(0)
- Church Town
- Colne
- Padiham
2014–2015	Clitheroe		
2015–2016	Colne		(34)
- Ramsbottom United
- Nelson
- Padiham
2017–2018	Northwich Victoria		
2018	Padiham		
2018–2019	Longridge Town		(30)
2019	Thimphu City	9	(19)
2019–2020	Punjab	5	(0)
2020–2021	Doncaster Rovers	4	(3)
2021	St Albans Saints	8	(1)
2022	Caroline Springs George Cross	21	(15)
2023	Sydenham Park SC	20	(8)
- * Club domestic league appearances and goals

Jason Stewart Hart (born 5 September 1990) is an English professional footballer who plays as a forward.

== Career ==
Hart came through the youth ranks at local club Blackburn Rovers, though would depart without first-team experience and would subsequently take a football break. After a trial with Accrington Stanley, Hart would return with Rossendale United before featuring in the Accrington Combination League with Church Town. A move to Colne would follow, where he'd score over twenty goals in the 2012–13 North West Counties Football League Premier Division. Hart had a stint with Padiham after leaving Colne, prior to signing with Clitheroe in 2014. He spent one season with the Northern Premier League Division One North club, before being sacked.

In 2015, Hart rejoined Colne for a second spell. Thirty-four goals would follow in the 2015–16 NWCFL as Colne won the title and promotion to the Northern Premier League division that he played in for Clitheroe. In June 2016, Hart secured a contract across the competition with recently relegated Ramsbottom United. Upon leaving Ramsbottom, Hart appeared for Nelson and, for a second time, Padiham. October 2017 saw Hart head to Northwich Victoria of the NWCFL. However, the forward would return to Padiham in the succeeding March. He would be on the move again within months, penning terms with Longridge Town.

Hart, after thirty goals for Longridge, switched England for Bhutan in June 2019, as he joined Premier League side Thimphu City; managed by fellow Englishman Josh Shepherd. He scored on his competitive debut against Druk Star, with another goal following in his second match versus Paro. Hart scored twenty goals and assisted nine more for Thimphu City. Hart departed at the end of 2019, subsequently joining I-League team Punjab. He departed Punjab in January 2020 after five appearances. Soon after, Hart signed with Australian Victorian State League Division 2 outfit Doncaster Rovers. On 9 May 2021, Hart debuted for NPL side St Albans Saints.

== Personal life ==
In April 2015, Hart was dismissed by Clitheroe F.C. after he was recorded having sex with a woman in the away dugout while wearing their training kit after a league match. The video was circulated widely across social media. Anne Barker, chairwoman of Clitheroe, said Hart brought the club into disrepute and he was dismissed following the incident.

He separated from his partner and moved overseas shortly after the incident.

In May 2025, Hart was deported from Australia following multiple convictions for assault, and allegations that he had used domestic violence and coercive control against multiple women. Some of the women started an online petition calling for Hart's visa to be revoked.

== Honours ==
Colne

- North West Counties Football League Premier Division: 2015–16

Longridge Town

- North West Counties Football League Division One North: 2018–19
