= List of SC Delhi players =

Sporting Club Delhi (earlier Hyderabad FC) is a professional association football club based in Delhi, India, that plays in Indian Super League. The club was formed in 2019 and played its first competitive match on 25 October 2019 and lost to ATK 5–0.

== List of players ==
The list includes all the players registered under an Hyderabad FC contract. Some players might not have featured in a professional game for the club.

Name	Nat	Pos^{[NB]}	Hyderabad FC career	Apps	Goals	Ref
Kamaljit Singh	(India)	Goalkeeper	2019–2020	12	0	
Laxmikant Kattimani	(India)	Goalkeeper	2019–present	6	0	
Anuj Kumar	(India)	Goalkeeper	2019–present	0	0	
Matt Kilgallon	(England)	Defender	2019–present	17	1	
Rafa	(Spain)	Defender	2019–present	6	0	
Gurtej Singh	(India)	Defender	2019–present	13	0	
Tarif Akhand	(India)	Defender	2019–present	1	0	
Sahil Panwar	(India)	Defender	2019–present	12	0	
Dimple Bhagat	(India)	Defender	2019–present	2	0	
Souvik Chakrabarti	(India)	Defender	2020–present	10	1	
Ashish Rai	(India)	Defender	2019–2022	48	0	
Adil Khan	(India)	Midfielder	2019–present	14	0	
Robin Singh	(India)	Midfielder	2019–2020	7	1	
Rohit Kumar	(India)	Midfielder	2019–2020	9	1	
Marko Stanković	(Austria)	Midfielder	2019–2020	15	2	
Deependra Negi	(India)	Midfielder	2019–present	0	0	
Mohammad Yasir	(India)	Midfielder	2019–present	15	1	
Abhash Thapa	(India)	Midfielder	2019–2020	0	0	
Hitesh Sharma	(India)	Midfielder	2020–present	0	0	
Sahil Tavora	(India)	Midfielder	2019–present	2	0	
Néstor Gordillo	(Spain)	Midfielder	2019–present	9	1	
Abhishek Halder	(India)	Midfielder	2019–present	8	0	
Marcelinho	(Brazil)	Forward	2019–2020	17	7	
Laldanmawia Ralte	(India)	Forward	2019–present	5	0	
Ghani Nigam	(India)	Forward	2019–present	5	0	
Nikhil Poojari	(India)	Forward	2019–present	18	0	
Giles Barnes	(Jamaica)	Forward	2019–present	12	0	
Bobô	(Brazil)	Forward	2019–present	13	5	
Liston Colaco	(India)	Forward	2020–present	4	2	
Subrata Pal	(India)	Goalkeeper	2020–present	0	0	
Lalbiakhlua Jongte	(India)	Goalkeeper	2020–present	0	0	
Rohit Danu	(India)	Forward	2020–present	0	0	
Akash Mishra	(India)	Defender	2020–present	0	0	
Halicharan Narzary	(India)	Forward	2020–present	0	0	
Chinglensana Singh	(India)	Defender	2020–present	0	0	
Joel Chianese	(Australia)	Forward	2020–present	0	0	
João Victor	(Brazil)	Midfielder	2020–present	0	0	
Lluís Sastre	(Spain)	Midfielder	2020–present	0	0	
Aridane Santana	(Spain)	Forward	2020–present	0	0	
Odei Onaindia	(Spain)	Defender	2020–present	0	0	
Francisco Sandaza	(Spain)	Forward	2020–present	0	0	

== List of overseas players ==
The list includes all the overseas players registered under an Hyderabad FC contract. Some players might not have featured in a professional game for the club.

Name	Nat	Pos^{[NB]}	Hyderabad FC career	Apps	Goals	Ref
Matt Kilgallon	(England)	Defender	2019–present	17	1	
Rafa	(Spain)	Defender	2019–present	6	0	
Marko Stanković	(Austria)	Midfielder	2019–2020	15	2	
Néstor Gordillo	(Spain)	Midfielder	2019–present	9	1	
Marcelinho	(Brazil)	Forward	2019–2020	17	7	
Giles Barnes	(Jamaica)	Forward	2019–present	12	0	
Bobô	(Brazil)	Forward	2019–present	13	5	
Joel Chianese	(Australia)	Forward	2020–present	0	0	
João Victor	(Brazil)	Midfielder	2020–present	0	0	
Lluís Sastre	(Spain)	Midfielder	2020–present	0	0	
Aridane Santana	(Spain)	Forward	2020–present	0	0	
Odei Onaindia	(Spain)	Defender	2020–present	0	0	
Francisco Sandaza	(Spain)	Forward	2020–present	0	0	
Roland Alberg	(Suriname)	Midfielder	2020–present	0	0	
