= 2019–20 Hyderabad FC season =

2019–20 season of Hyderabad FC

Hyderabad
2019–20 season
- Head coach: Phil Brown (until 10 January 2020); Mehrajuddin Wadoo (interim, until 16 January 2020); Xavier Gurri Lopez (interim, from 24 January 2020)
- Stadium: G.M.C. Balayogi Athletic Stadium
- Indian Super League: 10th
- Top goalscorer: League: Marcelinho (7); All: Marcelinho (7)
- Highest home attendance: 12,114 (vs. Kerala Blasters, 2 November 2019, ISL)
- Lowest home attendance: 3,000 (vs. Chennaiyin, 10 January 2020, ISL)
- Average home league attendance: 7,299
- Biggest win: 5–1 (vs. NorthEast United, 20 February 2020, ISL)
- Biggest defeat: 0–5 (vs. ATK, 25 October 2019, ISL)
Home colours	Away colours
- All statistics correct as of 20 February 2020.

The 2019–20 Hyderabad FC season was the first ever competitive season in the club's history and the inaugural season in the Indian Super League.

== Background ==
The Hyderabad FC replaced the FC Pune City in 2019 and will debut in the 2019–20 Indian Super League. FC Pune City was dissolved after the 2018–19 season due to prolonged financial and technical troubles. The franchise was taken over by Vijay Madduri, a Hyderabad-based entrepreneur, and Varun Tripuraneni, the former CEO of the Kerala Blasters. The owners decided to move the franchise to their home city of Hyderabad. The club was announced on 27 August 2019. The Hyderabad FC will be the first club from Hyderabad to feature in the Indian Super League.

The club officially unveiled their logo on 21 September and the home jersey for their maiden season on 29 September. The Hyderabad FC will play their home matches at G.M.C. Balayogi Athletic Stadium which has a capacity of 30,000.

== Kits ==
Home	Away

== Management team ==
Role	Name
Head Coach	(Spain) Xavier Gurri Lopez
Assistant Coach	(India) Mehrajuddin Wadoo
Head Performance Analyst	(India) Joy Gabriel

== Players ==
No.	Name	Nationality	Position	Date of birth	Signed Year	Previous club
Goalkeepers
1	Kamaljit Singh	(India)	GK	28 December 1995 (aged 23)	2019	(India) Pune City
33	Laxmikant Kattimani	(India)	GK	3 May 1989 (aged 30)	2019	(India) FC Goa
40	Kunzang Bhutia	(India)	GK	3 January 1994 (aged 25)	2020	(India) Churchill Brothers
Defenders
3	Sahil Panwar	(India)	DF	15 December 1999 (aged 19)	2019	(India) Pune City
4	Rafa	(Spain)	DF	9 April 1985 (aged 34)	2019	(Spain) Rayo Majadahonda
5	Adil Khan	(India)	DF	7 July 1988 (aged 31)	2019	(India) Pune City
6	Matthew Kilgallon	(England)	DF	8 January 1984 (aged 35)	2019	(Scotland) Hamilton Academical
13	Gurtej Singh	(India)	DF	18 December 1989 (aged 29)	2019	(India) Pune City
25	Dimple Bhagat	(India)	DF	12 December 1998 (aged 20)	2019	(India) Gokulam Kerala
36	Souvik Chakrabarti	(India)	DF	12 July 1991 (aged 28)	2020	(India) Mumbai City
44	Ashish Rai	(India)	DF	2 February 1999 (aged 20)	2019	(India) Pune City
Midfielders
8	Sahil Tavora	(India)	MF	19 October 1995 (aged 24)	2019	(India) Mumbai City
11	Abhishek Halder	(India)	MF	5 October 1999 (aged 20)	2019	(India) Pune City
12	Deependra Negi	(India)	MF	20 November 1998 (aged 20)	2019	(India) Kerala Blasters
14	Néstor Gordillo	(Spain)	MF	22 August 1989 (aged 30)	2019	(India) Chennai City
15	Marko Stanković	(Austria)	MF	17 February 1986 (aged 33)	2019	(India) Pune City
16	Shankar Sampingiraj	(India)	MF	14 December 1994 (aged 24)	2019	(India) Pune City
19	Rohit Kumar	(India)	MF	1 April 1997 (aged 22)	2019	(India) Pune City
20	Ajay Chhetri	(India)	MF	1 July 1999 (aged 20)	2020	(India) Bengaluru
22	Ghani Ahmmed Nigam	(India)	MF	1 May 1988 (aged 31)	2019	(India) Gokulam Kerala
26	Hitesh Sharma	(India)	MF	25 December 1997 (aged 21)	2020	(India) ATK
27	Nikhil Poojari	(India)	MF	3 September 1995 (aged 24)	2019	(India) Pune City
32	Mohammad Yasir	(India)	MF	14 April 1998 (aged 21)	2019	(India) Pune City
Forwards
7	Giles Barnes	(Jamaica)	FW	5 August 1988 (aged 31)	2019	(United States) Colorado Rapids
9	Bobô	(Brazil)	FW	9 January 1985 (aged 34)	2019	(Turkey) Alanyaspor
10	Marcelinho ^{(C)}	(Brazil)	FW	5 July 1987 (aged 32)	2019	(India) Pune City
28	Liston Colaco	(India)	FW	12 November 1998 (aged 20)	2020	(India) Goa

Last updated: 4 February 2020.
Source: Indian Super League

== New contracts ==
No.	Position	Player	Date	Until	Source
5	DF	(India) Adil Khan	23 January 2020	31 May 2023	
11	DF	(India) Abhishek Halder	28 January 2020	31 May 2022	
32	MF	(India) Mohammad Yasir	17 February 2020	31 May 2023	
44	DF	(India) Ashish Rai	17 February 2020	31 May 2023	
27	MF	(India) Nikhil Poojari	20 April 2020	31 May 2023	
25	DF	(India) Dimple Bhagat	2 May 2020	31 May 2022	
33	GK	(India) Laxmikant Kattimani	30 May 2020	31 May 2021	

== Transfers ==
=== In ===
No.	Pos.	Player	From	Date	Until	Fee	Source
Winter
28	FW	(India) Liston Colaco	(India) Goa	14 January 2020	31 May 2022	Free transfer	
40	GK	(India) Kunzang Bhutia	(India) Churchill Brothers	14 January 2020		Free transfer	
36	DF	(India) Souvik Chakrabarti	(India) Mumbai City	28 January 2020	31 May 2023	Free transfer	
26	MF	(India) Hitesh Sharma	(India) ATK	31 January 2020	31 May 2021	Free transfer	

=== Loan in ===
No.	Pos.	Player	From	Date	Until	Fee	Source
Winter
20	MF	(India) Ajay Chhetri	(India) Bengaluru	7 January 2020	31 May 2020	Undisclosed	

=== Loan out ===
No.	Pos.	Player	To	Date	Until	Fee	Source
Winter
34	DF	(India) Tarif Akhand	(India) Chennai City	5 January 2020	31 May 2020	Undisclosed	
	DF	(India) Abhash Thapa	(India) East Bengal	8 January 2020	31 May 2020	Undisclosed	
21	GK	(India) Anuj Kumar	(India) Indian Arrows	14 January 2020	31 May 2020	Undisclosed	
17	MF	(India) Laldanmawia Ralte	(India) Real Kashmir	31 January 2020	31 May 2020	Undisclosed	
23	FW	(India) Robin Singh	(India) Real Kashmir	31 January 2020	31 May 2020	Undisclosed	
	DF	(India) Keenan Almeida	(India) Mumbai City	31 January 2020	31 May 2020	Undisclosed	

== Pre-season and friendlies ==
The Hyderabad FC played a pre-season friendly against an I-League club Real Kashmir FC on 4 October 2019. They drew the match 1–1 with Laldanmawia Ralte scoring the solitary goal for the Hyderabad. The hat-trick from Robin Singh in their next friendly guided the Hyderabad to a 4–2 win over the Velsao with Rafa scoring the fourth goal. The Hyderabad ended their pre-season tour on a winning note as Robin's brace and goal apiece from Marcelinho and Abhishek Halder helped them defeat the Minerva Punjab 4–0 in their last friendly match on 18 October.

4 October 2019 Friendly	Hyderabad	1–1	Real Kashmir	Goa
	Ralte	Report

9 October 2019 Friendly	Hyderabad	4–2	Velsao	Goa
	R Singh 3'; Rafa	Report

18 October 2019 Friendly	Hyderabad	4–0	Minerva Punjab	Goa
	R Singh 2'; Marcelinho; Halder	Report

== Competitions ==
=== Indian Super League ===
Phil Brown was appointed as the head coach of the Hyderabad FC who previously managed FC Pune City. He hired Neil McDonald and Mehrajuddin Wadoo as his assistant coaches and Aidan Davison as the goalkeeping coach.

The Hyderabad FC announced their squad on 8 October for their first competitive season. Despite being named in the squad, Néstor Gordillo will not be available until late December owing to the ban handed to him by All India Football Federation (AIFF).

The Hyderabad FC made their debut in the Indian Super League against the ATK in an away match at Kolkata on 25 October. The Hyderabad registered their heaviest defeat of the debut season in their first ever competitive match with a 5–0 loss against the ATK.

On 2 November, the Hyderabad came from behind to register a 2–1 win against the Kerala Blasters. This was their first ever competitive win in their third match of this season.

On 11 January, after loss against the Chennaiyin and after losing nine out of twelve league games, manager Phil Brown was sacked by Hyderabad. The current assistant coach, Wadoo, took charge as interim head coach. Former Bengaluru coach Albert Roca was appointed Hyderabad new head coach on two season deal starting from 2020 to 2021 season while taking up the advisory role to the new coaching staff for the remainder of the season. On 23 January, Roca appointed Xavier Gurri Lopez as the interim coach until the end of the season.

On 20 February, the Hyderabad finished the league stage with a 5–1 win against the NorthEast United which also snapped their 14-match win-less streak and recorded their first away win in any competition. They ended their campaign with a last place finish as they registered two wins and four draws in 18 matches in their debut season and were eventually not qualified for the playoff stage.

==== League table ====
Pos	Team	Pld	W	D	L	GF	GA	GD	Pts
6	Odisha	18	7	4	7	28	31	−3	25
7	Kerala Blasters	18	4	7	7	29	32	−3	19
8	Jamshedpur	18	4	6	8	22	35	−13	18
9	NorthEast United	18	2	8	8	16	30	−14	14
10	Hyderabad	18	2	4	12	21	39	−18	10

Source: Indian Super League
Rules for classification: 1) points; 2) head-to-head points; 3) head-to-head goal difference; 4) head-to-head goals scored; 5) goal difference; 5) number of goals scored; 6) fair play ranking; 6) drawing of lots

==== Results by matchday ====
Matchday	1	2	3	4	5	6	7	8	9	10	11	12	13	14	15	16	17	18
Ground	A	A	H	H	A	H	H	A	H	A	A	H	H	H	A	A	H	A
Result	L	L	W	L	L	D	L	L	D	L	L	L	L	D	L	L	D	W
Position	10	10	9	9	10	10	10	10	10	10	10	10	10	10	10	10	10	10

Updated to match(es) played on 20 February 2020. Source: soccerway
A = Away; H = Home; W = Win; D = Draw; L = Loss

==== Fixtures ====
League stage

25 October 2019 1	ATK	5–0	Hyderabad	Kolkata
19:30 IST (UTC+05:30)	Williams 25', 44'; Krishna 27'; Soosairaj (yellow card) 81'; García 88', 90+4'	Report	Panwar (yellow card) 42'; R Singh (yellow card) 60'; Marcelinho (yellow card) 87'	Stadium: Salt Lake Stadium; Attendance: 26,240; Referee: Bora; Man of the Match: Williams (ATK)

29 October 2019 2	Jamshedpur	3–1	Hyderabad	Jamshedpur
19:30 IST (UTC+05:30)	Choudhary 34'; Jadhav 62'; Castel 75'	Report	Stanković (yellow card) 12'; Marcelinho 45+1'	Stadium: JRD Tata Sports Complex; Attendance: 20,539; Referee: Nagvenkar; Man of the Match: Choudhary (Jamshedpur)

2 November 2019 3	Hyderabad	2–1	Kerala Blasters	Hyderabad
19:30 IST (UTC+05:30)	Halder (yellow card) 45+1'; Stanković 54' (pen.) (yellow card) 65'; G Singh (yellow card) 78'; Marcelinho 81' (yellow card) 83'	Report	Rahul 34'; Gning (yellow card) 80'; Rodrigues (yellow card) 90+1'	Stadium: G. M. C. Balayogi Athletic Stadium; Attendance: 12,114; Referee: Venkatesh; Man of the Match: Marcelinho (Hyderabad)

6 November 2019 4	Hyderabad	0–1	NorthEast United	Hyderabad
19:30 IST (UTC+05:30)	G Singh (yellow card) 13'; Halder (yellow card) 76'; Sampingiraj (yellow card) 85'; Kilgallon (yellow card) 89'; K Singh (yellow card) 90+5'	Report	Vaz (yellow card) 85'; Barreiro 86' (pen.); Singh (yellow card) 90+2'; Chowdhury (yellow card) 90+4'	Stadium: G. M. C. Balayogi Athletic Stadium; Attendance: 8,190; Referee: Thakur; Man of the Match: Barreiro (NorthEast)

25 November 2019 5	Chennaiyin	2–1	Hyderabad	Chennai
19:30 IST (UTC+05:30)	Thapa (yellow card) 48'; Firțulescu (yellow card) 84'; Schembri 90+2' (yellow card) 90+2'; Valskis 90+6' (yellow card) 90+7'	Report	Bobô (yellow card) 61'; G Singh (yellow card) 84'; Kilgallon 90+5'	Stadium: Jawaharlal Nehru Stadium; Attendance: 7,500; Referee: Metei; Man of the Match: Thapa (Chennaiyin)

29 November 2019 6	Hyderabad	1–1	Bengaluru	Hyderabad
19:30 IST (UTC+05:30)	Yasir (yellow card) 27'; Panwar (red card) 56'; Marcelinho (yellow card) 60'; G Singh (yellow card) 82'; R Singh (yellow card) 87' (goal) 90+2'	Report	Chhetri 2'; Serrán (yellow card) 37'; Paartalu (yellow card) 47'; Delgado (yellow card) 59'	Stadium: G. M. C. Balayogi Athletic Stadium; Attendance: 8,172; Referee: Metei; Man of the Match: R Singh (Hyderabad)

8 December 2019 7	Hyderabad	0–1	Goa	Hyderabad
19:30 IST (UTC+05:30)	K Singh (yellow card) 41'; Marcelinho (yellow card) 76'	Report	Fernandes (yellow card) 49'; Singh (yellow card) 50'; Singh 68'; Nawaz (yellow card) 73'; Boumous (yellow card) 90+1'	Stadium: G. M. C. Balayogi Athletic Stadium; Attendance: 6,123; Referee: Baksi; Man of the Match: Singh (Goa)

11 December 2019 8	Odisha	3–2	Hyderabad	Pune
19:30 IST (UTC+05:30)	Rai (yellow card) 11' (yellow-red card) 64'; Delgado 27'; Hernández 41'; Sarangi (yellow card) 55'; Guedes 71' (pen.); Tébar (yellow card) 90+2'	Report	Bobô 65' (pen.); R Kumar 89'	Stadium: Shree Shiv Chhatrapati Sports Complex; Attendance: 3,500; Referee: Alkhudhayr; Man of the Match: Mawihmingthanga (Odisha)

21 December 2019 9	Hyderabad	2–2	ATK	Hyderabad
19:30 IST (UTC+05:30)	Barnes (yellow card) 9'; Bobô 39', 85'; R Singh (yellow card) 86'; Khan (yellow card) 89'	Report	Krishna 15' (pen.), 90'; Rathi (yellow card) 45+2'; Singh (yellow card) 64'	Stadium: G. M. C. Balayogi Athletic Stadium; Attendance: 3,100; Referee: Senthil; Man of the Match: Bobô (Hyderabad)

29 December 2019 10	Mumbai City	2–1	Hyderabad	Mumbai
19:30 IST (UTC+05:30)	Sougou 6', 78'; Golui (yellow card) 24' (yellow-red card) 68'; Chaudhari (yellow card) 51'; Kevyn (yellow card) 70'; Carlos (yellow card) 77'	Report	Bobô 81'	Stadium: Mumbai Football Arena; Attendance: 5,500; Referee: C. R. Srikrishna; Man of the Match: Sougou (Mumbai)

5 January 2020 11	Kerala Blasters	5–1	Hyderabad	Kochi
19:30 IST (UTC+05:30)	Ogbeche 33', 74'; Drobarov 39'; Bouli 45' (yellow card) 45+1'; Zuiverloon (yellow card) 58'; Singh 59'; Samad (yellow card) 87'	Report	Bobô 14'; Stanković (yellow card) 44'; Halder (yellow card) 62'	Stadium: Jawaharlal Nehru Stadium; Attendance: 9,856; Referee: John; Man of the Match: Ogbeche (Kerala)

10 January 2020 12	Hyderabad	1–3	Chennaiyin	Hyderabad
19:30 IST (UTC+05:30)	Stanković (yellow card) 17'; Marcelinho 88' (yellow card) 90+1'	Report	Crivellaro 40'; Valskis 43', 65'; Singh (yellow card) 51'	Stadium: G. M. C. Balayogi Athletic Stadium; Attendance: 3,000; Referee: Baksi; Man of the Match: Valskis (Chennaiyin)

15 January 2020 13	Hyderabad	1–2	Odisha	Hyderabad
19:30 IST (UTC+05:30)	Marcelinho 1'; Bhagat (yellow card) 15' (yellow-red card) 45+2'	Report	Santana 15', 45+4'; Rai (yellow card) 42'; Hernández (yellow card) 49'; Dorronsoro (yellow card) 90+2'	Stadium: G. M. C. Balayogi Athletic Stadium; Attendance: 7,000; Referee: Venkatesh; Man of the Match: Santana (Odisha)

24 January 2020 14	Hyderabad	1–1	Mumbai City	Hyderabad
19:30 IST (UTC+05:30)	Poojari (yellow card) 42'; Stanković 90+4' (pen.)	Report	Das (yellow card) 34'; Larbi 43' (pen.); Kevyn (yellow card) 73'; Chaudhari (yellow card) 78'	Stadium: G. M. C. Balayogi Athletic Stadium; Attendance: 8,000; Referee: Sherzod; Man of the Match: Khan (Hyderabad)

30 January 2020 15	Bengaluru	1–0	Hyderabad	Bengaluru
19:30 IST (UTC+05:30)	Kumar 7' (yellow card) 25'; Delgado (yellow card) 27'; Khabra (yellow card) 28'; Juanan (yellow card) 78'	Report	Barnes (yellow card) 45+2'; Yasir (yellow card) 59'; Khan (yellow card) 70'; Kilgallon (yellow card) 90+4'	Stadium: Sree Kanteerava Stadium; Attendance: 9,834; Referee: Nagvenkar; Man of the Match: Kumar (Bengaluru)

5 February 2020 16	Goa	4–1	Hyderabad	Margao
19:30 IST (UTC+05:30)	Boumous 19', 50'; Jahouh (yellow card) 63'; Coro 68', 87' (pen.)	Report	Rai (yellow card) 23'; Marcelinho 64'; Kilgallon (yellow card) 66'; Chakrabarti (yellow card) 85'	Stadium: Fatorda Stadium; Attendance: 10,212; Referee: Gupta; Man of the Match: Boumous (Goa)

12 February 2020 17	Hyderabad	1–1	Jamshedpur	Hyderabad
19:30 IST (UTC+05:30)	Gordillo 39'; Marcelinho (yellow card) 81'; Halder (yellow card) 90'; Panwar (yellow card) 90+5'; Stanković (yellow card) 90+6'	Report	Amin (yellow card) 45'; Passi 90+3' (yellow card) 90+6'	Stadium: G. M. C. Balayogi Athletic Stadium; Attendance: 10,000; Referee: Saha; Man of the Match: Colaco (Hyderabad)

20 February 2020 18	NorthEast United	1–5	Hyderabad	Guwahati
19:30 IST (UTC+05:30)	Keogh 35'; Gallego (yellow card) 58'; Cháves (yellow card) 78'; Nongrum 90+3'	Report	Colaco 4', 40'; Marcelinho 13', 88'; Poojari (yellow card) 33'; Panwar (yellow card) 45+2'; Yasir 55'	Stadium: Indira Gandhi Athletic Stadium; Referee: Mondal; Man of the Match: Colaco (Hyderabad)

== Player statistics ==
=== Appearances and goals ===
No.	Pos.	Player	ISL	
No.	Pos.	Player	Apps	Goals
1	GK	(India) Kamaljit Singh	12	0
3	DF	(India) Sahil Panwar	9 (3)	0
4	DF	(Spain) Rafa	6	0
5	DF	(India) Adil Khan	14	0
6	DF	(England) Matthew Kilgallon	17	1
7	FW	(Jamaica) Giles Barnes	5 (7)	0
8	MF	(India) Sahil Tavora	1 (1)	0
9	FW	(Brazil) Bobô	13	5
10	FW	(Brazil) Marcelinho	17	7
11	MF	(India) Abhishek Halder	3 (5)	0
12	MF	(India) Deependra Negi	0	0
13	DF	(India) Gurtej Singh	11 (2)	0
14	MF	(Spain) Néstor Gordillo	7 (2)	1
15	MF	(Austria) Marko Stanković	13 (2)	2
16	MF	(India) Shankar Sampingiraj	3 (2)	0
19	MF	(India) Rohit Kumar	8 (1)	1
20	MF	(India) Ajay Chhetri	0 (2)	0
22	MF	(India) Ghani Ahmmed Nigam	1 (4)	0
25	DF	(India) Dimple Bhagat	1 (1)	0
26	MF	(India) Hitesh Sharma	0	0
27	MF	(India) Nikhil Poojari	18	0
28	FW	(India) Liston Colaco	2 (2)	2
32	MF	(India) Mohammad Yasir	10 (5)	1
33	GK	(India) Laxmikant Kattimani	6	0
36	DF	(India) Souvik Chakrabarti	2 (1)	0
40	GK	(India) Kunzang Bhutia	0	0
44	DF	(India) Ashish Rai	11 (3)	0
Players have left the club
17	MF	(India) Laldanmawia Ralte	3 (2)	0
21	GK	(India) Anuj Kumar	0	0
23	FW	(India) Robin Singh	5 (4)	1
34	DF	(India) Tarif Akhand	0 (1)	0
	DF	(India) Keenan Almeida	0	0
	DF	(India) Abhash Thapa	0	0

Last updated: 20 February 2020.
Source: Competitions

=== Top scorers ===
Rank	No.	Pos	Player	ISL
1	10	FW	(Brazil) Marcelinho	7
2	9	FW	(Brazil) Bobô	5
3	15	MF	(Austria) Marko Stanković	2
3	28	FW	(India) Liston Colaco	2
5	6	DF	(England) Matthew Kilgallon	1
5	14	MF	(Spain) Néstor Gordillo	1
5	19	MF	(India) Rohit Kumar	1
5	23	FW	(India) Robin Singh	1
5	32	MF	(India) Mohammad Yasir	1
Own goals				0
Total				21

Last updated: 20 February 2020.
Source: Competitions

=== Top assists ===
Rank	No.	Pos	Player	ISL
1	10	FW	(Brazil) Marcelinho	2
2	11	MF	(India) Abhishek Halder	1
2	13	MF	(India) Gurtej Singh	1
2	14	MF	(Spain) Néstor Gordillo	1
2	15	MF	(Austria) Marko Stanković	1
2	19	MF	(India) Rohit Kumar	1
2	44	DF	(India) Ashish Rai	1
Total				8

Last updated: 20 February 2020.
Source: Competitions

=== Clean sheets ===
Rank	No.	Pos	Player	ISL
Total				0

Last updated: 20 February 2020.
Source: Competitions

=== Discipline ===
No.	Pos	Player	ISL		
No.	Pos	Player	Booked	(yellow card) (yellow-red card)	Sent off (straight red)
1	GK	(India) Kamaljit Singh	2	0	0
3	DF	(India) Sahil Panwar	3	0	1
5	DF	(India) Adil Khan	2	0	0
6	DF	(England) Matthew Kilgallon	3	0	0
7	FW	(Jamaica) Giles Barnes	2	0	0
9	FW	(Brazil) Bobô	1	0	0
10	FW	(Brazil) Marcelinho	6	0	0
11	MF	(India) Abhishek Halder	4	0	0
13	DF	(India) Gurtej Singh	4	0	0
15	MF	(Austria) Marko Stanković	5	0	0
16	MF	(India) Shankar Sampingiraj	1	0	0
23	FW	(India) Robin Singh	3	0	0
25	DF	(India) Dimple Bhagat	0	1	0
27	MF	(India) Nikhil Poojari	2	0	0
32	MF	(India) Mohammad Yasir	2	0	0
36	DF	(India) Souvik Chakrabarti	1	0	0
44	DF	(India) Ashish Rai	1	0	0
TOTALS			42	1	1

Last updated: 20 February 2020.
Source: Competitions

=== Summary ===
Competition	P	W	D	L	GF	GA	CS	Booked	(yellow card) (yellow-red card)	Sent off (straight red)
Indian Super League	18	2	4	12	21	39	0	42	1	1

Last updated: 20 February 2020.
Source: Competitions

== Awards ==
No.	Pos.	Player	Award	Source
10	FW	(Brazil) Marcelinho	ISL Fans' Goal of the Week (Week 3)	
