= 2018–19 FC Pune City season =

Last season in existence of FC Pune City

FC Pune City
2018–19 season
- Manager: (England) Phil Brown
- Stadium: Balewadi Sports Complex
- ISL: 7th of 10
- Super Cup: Round of 16

The 2018–19 FC Pune City season is the club's fifth season since its establishment in 2014 and their fifth season in the Indian Super League. This was the club's last season in the Indian Super League.

== Background ==
=== Transfers ===
==== Contract Extension ====
No.	Position	Player	Date	Ref
9	FW	(Uruguay) Emiliano Alfaro	11 June 2018	
10	FW	(Brazil) Marcelinho	13 June 2018	
5	MF	(India) Adil Khan	25 June 2018	
17	MF	(India) Rohit Kumar	29 June 2018	
20	FW	(Brazil) Diego Carlos	4 July 2018	
15	MF	(Austria) Marko Stanković	4 July 2018	
3	DF	(India) Gurtej Singh	19 July 2018	
1	GK	(India) Kamaljit Singh	19 July 2018	
31	DF	(India) Lalchhuanmawia	19 July 2018	

==== In ====
No.	Position	Player	Previous club	Transfer fee	Date	Ref
11	MF	(India) Gabriel Fernandes	East Bengal	Free agent	9 July 2018	
16	MF	(India) Shankar Sampingiraj	ATK	Free agent	9 July 2018	
–	FW	(India) Robin Singh	ATK	Free agent	23 July 2018	
27	MF	(India) Nikhil Poojari	East Bengal	Free agent	26 July 2018	
–	MF	(India) Alwyn George	Bengaluru FC	Free agent	26 July 2018	
32	DF	(India) Keenan Almeida	Chennaiyin	Free agent	30 July 2018	
–	FW	(Canada) Iain Hume	Kerala Blasters	Free agent	2 August 2018	
21	DF	(Uruguay) Martín Díaz	NorthEast United	Free agent	17 August 2018	
–	DF	(England) Matt Mills	(England) Barnsley	Free agent	21 August 2018	
–	MF	(Spain) Jonathan Vila	(Spain) Recreativo	Free agent	23 August 2018	
–	DF	(India) Ashutosh Mehta	(India) ATK	Free agent	23 August 2018	

==== Out ====
No.	Position	Player	Outgoing club	Ref
19	MF	(India) Kean Lewis	(India) Bengaluru FC	
7	MF	(Brazil) Jonatan Lucca	(Portugal) C.F. Os Belenenses	
	DF	(India) Sebastian Thangmuansang	(India) NEROCA	
4	MF	(Spain) Rafa	(Spain) CF Rayo Majadahonda	
6	MF	(Spain) Marcos Tébar	(India) Delhi Dynamos	
11	FW	(India) Ajay Singh	(India) Gokulam Kerala	
23	FW	(India) Jewel Raja	(India) Mohammedan	
21	DF	(Spain) Lolo	unattached	

== Pre-season and friendlies ==
FC Pune City kicked -off their pre-season preparations by participating in the second edition of the AWES Cup in Goa from 29 August 2018.

In the last edition of AWES Cup, FC Pune City Reserves squad went up to semifinals before losing to Dempo Sports Club 1–0. But this time around, the club has decided to participate in the event with their entire first team squad. FC Pune City is placed along with Dempo SC, Salgaocar FC and FC Goa in Group A.

29 August 2018 AWES Cup 2018	Salgaocar	2–0	FC Pune City	Vasco da Gama, Goa, India
16:00 IST	Ronaldo Olivera 23'; Devendra Murgaokar 60'	Report		Stadium: Tilak Maidan Stadium

30 August 2018 Friendly	Indian Arrows	1–1	FC Pune City	Old Goa, India
15:30 IST		Source		Stadium: Dempo S.C. training ground

6 September 2018 AWES Cup 2018	FC Pune City	3–3	FC Goa(R)	Vasco da Gama, Goa, India
16:00 IST	Matt Mills 15'; Diego Carlos 36'; Emiliano Alfaro 90+2'	Report	Hayden Fernandes (?); Opa Ralte (?)	Stadium: Tilak Maidan Stadium

9 September 2018 AWES Cup 2018	Dempo	3–1	FC Pune City	Vasco da Gama, Goa, India
16:00 IST	Velito Cruz 56'; Jessel Carneiro; Latesh 68'	Report	Jakob Vanlalhimpuia	Stadium: Tilak Maidan Stadium

16 September 2018 Friendly	Churchill Brothers	1–2	FC Pune City	Old Goa, India
	Willis Plaza	Report	Emiliano Alfaro	Stadium: Dempo S.C. training ground

17 September 2018 Friendly	Gokulam Kerala	2–3	FC Pune City	Old Goa, India
	Erisa	Report	Abhishek Halder; R.Singh; Marko Stanković (pen.)	Stadium: Dempo S.C. training ground

26 September 2018 Friendly	Pune City FC	1–1	Chennai City
IST	Goal	Report	Néstor Gordillo

== Players ==
As of 31 August 2018

=== Appearances and goals ===
No.	Pos	Nat	Player	Total		ISL		Super Cup	
No.	Pos	Nat	Player	Apps	Goals	Apps	Goals	Apps	Goals
Goalkeepers
1	GK	(India) IND	Kamaljit Singh	0	0	0	0	0	0
13	GK	(India) IND	Vishal Kaith	0	0	0	0	0	0
24	GK	(India) IND	Anuj Kumar	0	0	0	0	0	0
Defenders
18	DF	(India) IND	Ashutosh Mehta	0	0	0	0	0	0
3	DF	(India) IND	Gurtej Singh	0	0	0	0	0	0
36	DF	(India) IND	Sahil Panwar	0	0	0	0	0	0
4	DF	(England) ENG	Matt Mills	0	0	0	0	0	0
16	DF	(India) IND	Sarthak Golui	0	0	0	0	0	0
2	DF	(India) IND	Nim Dorjee Tamang	0	0	0	0	0	0
31	DF	(India) IND	Lalchhuanmawia	0	0	0	0	0	0
21	DF	(Uruguay) URU	Martín Díaz	0	0	0	0	0	0
	DF	(India) IND	Keenan Almeida	0	0	0	0	0	0
Midfielders
6	MF	(Spain) ESP	Jonathan Vila	0	0	0	0	0	0
8	MF	(India) IND	Shankar Sampingiraj	0	0	0	0	0	0
19	MF	(India) IND	Rohit Kumar	0	0	0	0	0	0
5	MF	(India) IND	Adil Khan	0	0	0	0	0	0
15	MF	(Austria) AUT	Marko Stanković	0	0	0	0	0	0
28	MF	(India) IND	Abhishek Halder	0	0	0	0	0	0
12	MF	(India) IND	Alwyn George	0	0	0	0	0	0
11	MF	(India) IND	Nikhil Poojari	0	0	0	0	0	0
	MF	(India) IND	Abhijit Sarkar	0	0	0	0	0	0
Forwards
23	FW	(India) IND	Robin Singh	0	0	0	0	0	0
10	FW	(Brazil) BRA	Marcelinho	0	0	0	0	0	0
20	FW	(Brazil) BRA	Diego Carlos	0	0	0	0	0	0
25	FW	(India) IND	Jakob Vanlalhimpuia	0	0	0	0	0	0
	FW	(India) IND	Gabriel Fernandes	0	0	0	0	0	0
	MF	(Canada) CAN	Iain Hume	0	0	0	0	0	0

- Source: soccerway

== Competitions ==
=== Indian Super League ===
==== Table ====
Pos	Team	Pld	W	D	L	GF	GA	GD	Pts
5	Jamshedpur	18	6	9	3	29	21	+8	27
6	ATK	18	6	6	6	18	22	−4	24
7	Pune City	18	6	4	8	24	30	−6	22
8	Delhi Dynamos	18	4	6	8	23	27	−4	18
9	Kerala Blasters	18	2	9	7	18	28	−10	15

Source: Indian Super League
Rules for classification: 1) points; 2) head-to-head points; 3) head-to-head goal difference; 4) head-to-head goals scored; 5) goal difference; 5) number of goals scored; 6) fair play ranking; 6) drawing of lots

==== League stage ====
22 October 2018 3	FC Pune City	0–3	Bengaluru FC	Pune
19:30 IST	Kuruniyan (yellow card) 10'; Panwar (yellow card) 59'		Chhetri 41', 43'; Khabra (yellow card) 47'; Miku 64'	Stadium: Shree Shiv Chhatrapati Sports Complex; Attendance: 8,193; Referee: Pranjal Banerjee; Man of the Match: Sunil Chhetri (Bengaluru FC)

== Technical staff ==
Position	Name
Manager	(England) Phil Brown
Assistant Coach	(Spain) Gonzalo Yarza
Technical Director	(India) Pradhyum Reddy
Assistant Coach	TBD
Goalkeeping Coach	(Turkey) Ali Uzunhasanoglu
Team Physiotherapists	TBD
Team Physiotherapists	(India) Sumedh Desai
Team Doctor	(India)
Team Operations Manager	(India) Ankur Paliwal
Team Masseur	(India) Ramkishan Singh
Kit Manager	(India)
Youth Team – Head Coach	(India) Anshul Katiyar
Youth Team – Assistant Coach	(India)
