= 2017–18 FC Pune City season =

4th season in existence of FC Pune City

FC Pune City
2017–18 season
- Head Coach: Ranko Popović
- Stadium: Balewadi Sports Complex
- ISL: TBD
- Top goalscorer: League: Emiliano Alfaro; All: Emiliano Alfaro
- Highest home attendance: 9,881 vs Chennaiyin (3 December 2017)
- Lowest home attendance: 7,112 vs Delhi Dynamos (22 November 2017)
- Average home league attendance: 8,668
- All statistics correct as of 10 December 2017.

The 2017–18 FC Pune City season will be the club's fourth season since its establishment in 2014 and their fourth season in the Indian Super League.This will be the first season for coach Ranko Popović with the club. He replaced Antonio López Habas middle of the pre–season.

== Background ==
Pune City finished sixth in 2016 ISL season and failed to qualify for the semifinals.

== Player movement ==
Due to the Indian Super League regulation each club was allowed to retain a maximum of two Indian players over the age of twenty-one (21) and 3 under-21 players from previous squad. Pune City retained goalkeeper Vishal Kaith and an under-21 forward Ashique Kuruniyan. On 10 July Pune City announced signing of Uruguayan striker Emiliano Alfaro.

In ISL players draft held on 23 July 2017, Pune City picked 14 players to the squad. Pune City picked goalkeeper Kamaljit Singh and added defenders Adil Khan, Lalchhuanmawia, Nim Dorjee Tamang, Harpreet Singh, Wayne Vaz, Gurtej Singh and Pawan Kumar from draft. Pune City added midfielders Kean Lewis, Jewel Raja, Isaac Vanmalsawma and Rohit Kumar to the squad and also picked forwards Baljit Sahni and Ajay Singh from draft.

On 4 August Pune City announce signing of Spanish midfielder Marcos Tébar. The club announced signing of Brazilian forward Marcelinho on 21 August. On 23 August Pune City announced their next signing Spanish defender Rafa Lopez Gomez. On 24 August Pune city announced signing of midfielder Jonatan Lucca. The club then announced signing Croatian defender Damir Grgic on 29 August. Pune City on 8 September announced their seventh foreigner as Brazilian forward Diego Carlos. Pune City signed their last foreigner Argentinian midfielder Robertino Pugliara on 12 August.

=== In ===
Position	Player	Old club	Date	Ref
FW	(Uruguay) Emiliano Alfaro	(United Arab Emirates) Al-Fujairah	10 July 2017	
DF	(India) Adil Khan	(India) Churchill Brothers	23 July 2017	
MF	(India) Kean Lewis	(India) Mohun Bagan	23 July 2017	
DF	(India) Lalchhuanmawia	(India) Bengaluru	23 July 2017	
MF	(India) Jewel Raja	(India) Minerva Punjab	23 July 2017	
DF	(India) Nim Dorjee Tamang	(India) Shillong Lajong	23 July 2017	
MF	(India) Isaac Vanmalsawma	(India) Shillong Lajong	23 July 2017	
DF	(India) Harpreet Singh	(India) Sporting Clube de Goa	23 July 2017	
DF	(India) Wayne Vaz	(India) Chennai City	23 July 2017	
GK	(India) Kamaljit Singh	(India) Minerva Punjab	23 July 2017	
FW	(India) Baljit Sahni	(India) Mumbai	23 July 2017	
MF	(India) Rohit Kumar	(India) DSK Shivajians	23 July 2017	
FW	(India) Ajay Singh	(India) Southern Samity	23 July 2017	
DF	(India) Gurtej Singh	(India) Fateh Hyderabad	23 July 2017	
DF	(India) Pawan Kumar	(India) Delhi United	23 July 2017	
MF	(Spain) Marcos Tébar	(Spain) Reus Deportiu	4 August 2017	
FW	(Brazil) Marcelinho	(Brazil) Avaí	21 August 2017	
DF	(Spain) Rafa Gomez	(Spain) Real Valladolid	23 August 2017	
MF	(Brazil) Jonatan Lucca	(Israel) Bnei Sakhnin	24 August 2017	
DF	(Croatia) Damir Grgic	(Slovenia) Rudar Velenje	29 August 2017	
FW	(Brazil) Diego Carlos	(Brazil) São Bento	8 September 2017	
MF	(Argentina) Robertino Pugliara	(Indonesia) Persipura Jayapura	12 September 2017	

=== Out ===
Pos.	Player	New Club	Date	Ref
GK	(Armenia) Apoula Edel	Released	1 January 2017	
MF	(India) Manish Maithani	Released	1 January 2017	
FW	(Mali) Dramane Traoré	Released	1 January 2017	
FW	(Mexico) Aníbal Zurdo	(Spain) Atletico Pinto	1 January 2017	
DF	(Equatorial Guinea) Eduardo Ferreira	Mohun Bagan	4 January 2017	
FW	(India) Arata Izumi	NEROCA	9 January 2017	
MF	(Spain) Bruno Herrero	(Spain) San Fernando	19 January 2017	
MF	(Spain) Pitu	(Spain) Llagostera	24 January 2017	
FW	(Senegal) Momar Ndoye	(Spain) Arandina	26 January 2017	
MF	(Spain) Jesús Tato	(Spain) La Roda	14 February 2017	
MF	(Mali) Mohamed Sissoko	(Italy) Ternana Calcio	17 February 2017	
GK	(India) Arindam Bhattacharya	Mumbai City	23 July 2017	
DF	(India) Yumnam Raju	Jamshedpur	23 July 2017	
DF	(India) Narayan Das	Goa	23 July 2017	
MF	(India) Francis Fernandes	Chennaiyin	23 July 2017	
MF	(India) Sanju Pradhan	Mumbai City	23 July 2017	
MF	(India) Lenny Rodrigues	Bengaluru	23 July 2017	
MF	(Argentina) Gustavo Oberman	(Argentina) Argentino de Quilmes	1 August 2017	
DF	(India) Gouramangi Singh	NEROCA	17 October 2017	
DF	(India) Dharmaraj Ravanan	Chennai City	23 October 2017	

== Pre-season and friendlies ==
Pune City stayed at Pune for pre-season. The club played their first friendly against DSK Shivajians U18 on 30 September and won 3–0. Goals scored by Kean Lewis, Adil Khan and Gaurav Bora. Then in next friendly against Chanmari Pune City won 5–0 on 16 October. Jonatan Lucca, Emiliano Alfaro, Rohit, Ajay Singh and Isaac scored a goal each for the club. Pune City Played East Bengal on 30 October and won 2–1. Lucca and Alfaro scored for Pune City. Mahmoud Amnah scored for East Bengal from penalty. Pune City played their next friendly against Mohun Bagan and won it 4–1. Alfaro scored brace, while Ajay Singh and Isaac scored a goal each for Pune City. Dipanda pulled one back for Mohun Bagan. Pune City played a 2–2 draw against Chennaiyin in their last friendly. Marcelinho and Diego Carlos scored for Pune City. Baoringdao Bodo scored the first goal for Chennaiyin and the second goal was an own goal.

30 September 2017 Friendly	Pune City	3–0	DSK Shivajians U18	Pune
9:30 IST	Kean 30'; Adil 49'; Gaurav Bora 68'			Stadium: Shree Shiv Chhatrapati Sports Complex

16 October 2017 Friendly	Pune City	5–0	Chanmari	Pune
19:00 IST	Lucca 9'; Alfaro 25'; Rohit 40'; Ajay 51'; Isaac 72'	Report		Stadium: Shree Shiv Chhatrapati Sports Complex

30 October 2017 Friendly	Pune City	2–1	East Bengal	Pune
IST	Lucca; Alfaro	Report	Amnah (pen.)	Stadium: Shree Shiv Chhatrapati Sports Complex

6 November 2017 Friendly	Pune City	4–1	Mohun Bagan	Pune
19:00 IST	Alfaro (pen.); Ajay; Isaac	Report	Dipanda	Stadium: Shree Shiv Chhatrapati Sports Complex

12 November 2017 Friendly	Pune City	2–2	Chennaiyin	Pune
IST	Marcelinho; Carlos	Report	Bodo; Gurtej (o.g.)	Stadium: Shree Shiv Chhatrapati Sports Complex

== Indian Super League ==
=== November ===
Pune City started with 2–3 loss against Delhi Dynamos in their first match of the 2017–18 Indian Super League season at home on 22 November. Paulinho Dias opened the scoring for Delhi in the 46th minute, while Lallianzuala Chhangte and Matías Mirabaje netted in the 54th and 65th minute, respectively. Emiliano Alfaro scored Pune’s first goal of the match in the 67th minute and Marcos Tebar netted their second in injury–time.

=== Table ===
Pos	Team	Pld	W	D	L	GF	GA	GD	Pts	Qualification or relegation
2	Chennaiyin (Note: Qualified for 2019 AFC Cup qualifying play-offs) (C)	18	9	5	4	24	19	+5	32	Qualification for ISL play-offs
3	Goa	18	9	3	6	42	28	+14	30	Qualification for ISL play-offs
4	Pune City	18	9	3	6	30	21	+9	30	Qualification for ISL play-offs
5	Jamshedpur	18	7	5	6	16	18	−2	26	
6	Kerala Blasters	18	6	7	5	20	22	−2	25	

Source: Indian Super League
Rules for classification: 1) points; 2) head-to-head points; 3) head-to-head goal difference; 4) head-to-head goals scored; 5) goal difference; 5) number of goals scored; 6) fair play ranking; 6) drawing of lots
(C) Champions

=== Matches ===
22 November 2017 1	Pune City	2–3	Delhi Dynamos	Pune, India
20:00 IST	Alfaro 67'; Marcelinho (yellow card) 87'; Tebar 90'	Report	Paulinho 46'; Changte 54'; Mirabaje 65' (yellow card) 79'; Cichero (yellow card) 88'	Stadium: Balewadi Stadium; Attendance: 7,912; Man of the Match: Lallianzuala Chhangte (Delhi Dynamos)

26 November 2017 2	ATK	1–4	Pune City	Kolkata
17:30 IST	Lyngdoh (yellow card) 27'; Bipin 50'; Kuqi (yellow card) 73'	Report	Marcelinho 13', 60'; Sahni (yellow card) 48'; Rohit 51'; Alfaro 80'; Grgič (yellow card) 87'	Stadium: Salt Lake Stadium; Attendance: 32816; Man of the Match: Marcelinho (Pune City)

29 November 2017 3	Pune City	2–1	Mumbai City	Pune
20:00 IST	Tebar (yellow card) 47'; Alfaro 74', 90'	Report	Balwant 15'; Sehnaj (yellow card) 45'	Stadium: Shree Shiv Chhatrapati Sports Complex; Attendance: 8,211; Man of the Match: Gerson Vieira (Mumbai City)

3 December 2017 4	Pune City	0–1	Chennaiyin	Pune
17:30 IST	Adil (yellow card) 54'	Report	Calderón (yellow card) 18'; Sereno (yellow card) 50' (goal) 81'; Dhanpal (yellow card) 60'; Anirudh (yellow card) 78'	Stadium: Shree Shiv Chhatrapati Sports Complex; Attendance: 9,881; Man of the Match: Jerry Lalrinzuala (Chennaiyin)

10 December 2017 5	Jamshedpur	0–1	Pune City	Jamshedpur
17:30 IST	Azuka (yellow card) 26'; Mehtab (yellow card) 55'	Report	Alfaro (yellow card) 26'; Adil 30'; Marcelinho (yellow card) 57'; Carlos (yellow card) 70'; Lalchhuanmawia (yellow card) 72' (yellow-red card) 81'	Stadium: JRD Tata Sports Complex; Attendance: 23,913; Man of the Match: Souvik Chakrabarti (Jamshedpur)

14 December 2017 6	Pune City	1–3	Bengaluru	Pune
20:00 IST	Adil 35'; Sahni (yellow card) 45' (yellow-red card) 56'; Ashique (yellow card) 67'	Report	Chhetri (yellow card) 28' (goal) 90+6'; Miku 64', 79'	Stadium: Shree Shiv Chhatrapati Sports Complex; Attendance: 9968; Man of the Match: Miku (Bengaluru)

23 December 2017 7	Goa	0–2	Pune City	Margao
17:30 IST	Jahouh (yellow card) 25'; Arana (yellow card) 83'	Report	Alfaro 72'; Lucca 84'	Stadium: Fatorda Stadium; Attendance: 18,600; Man of the Match: Adil Khan (Pune City)

30 December 2017 8	Pune City	5–0	NorthEast United	Pune
20:00 IST	Ashique 8'; Marcelinho 27', 45', 86' (yellow card) 87'; Adil 88'	Report		Stadium: Shree Shiv Chhatrapati Sports Complex; Attendance: 8762; Man of the Match: Marcelinho (Pune City)

4 January 2018 9	Kerala Blasters	1–1	Pune City	Kochi
20:00 IST				Stadium: Jawaharlal Nehru Stadium

13 January 2018 10	Chennaiyin	0–1	Pune City	Chennai
20:00 IST				Stadium: Jawaharlal Nehru Stadium

20 January 2018 11	Pune City	3–0	ATK	Pune
20:00 IST				Stadium: Shree Shiv Chhatrapati Sports Complex

24 January 2018 12	Pune City	2–1	Jamshedpur	Pune
20:00 IST				Stadium: Shree Shiv Chhatrapati Sports Complex

== Technical staff ==
As of September 2017

Position	Name
Head coach	(Serbia) Ranko Popovic
Assistant coach	(Serbia) Vladica Grujic
Assistant coach / Head of Football (Youth)	(Scotland) Pradhyum Reddy
Assistant coach	(Croatia) Ivica Barbaric
Goalkeeping coach	(Turkey) Ali Uzunhasanoglu
Team physiotherapists	(India) Vasant Bandi
Team physiotherapists	(India) Siddharth Parab
Team doctor	(India) Ajit Mapari
Team Operations Manager	(India) Ankur Paliwal
Youth Team – Head Coach	(India) Anshul Katiyar
Youth Team – Assistant Coach	(India) Mohan Dass

== Players statistics ==
=== Top scorers ===
Rank	No.	Pos	Nat	Player	ISL
1	9	FW	(Uruguay)	Emiliano Alfaro	6
1	10	FW	(Brazil)	Marcelinho	6
3	5	DF	(India)	Adil Khan	4
4	17	MF	(India)	Rohit Kumar	2
5	3	DF	(India)	Gurtej Singh	1
5	6	MF	(Spain)	Marcos Tebar	1
5	7	MF	(Brazil)	Jonatan Lucca	1
5	22	MF	(India)	Ashique Kuruniyan	1
5	20	MF	(Brazil)	Diego Carlos	1
TOTALS					23

Source: soccerway
Updated: 24 January 2018

=== Clean sheets ===
Rank	No.	Pos	Nat	Player	ISL
1	13	GK	(India)	Vishal Kaith	5
1	1	GK	(India)	Kamaljit Singh	0
TOTALS					5

Source: soccerway
Updated: 24 January 2018

=== Disciplinary record ===
Rank	No.	Pos	Nat	Player	ISL		Notes
Rank	No.	Pos	Nat	Player	Yellow card	Red card	Notes
1	12	MF	(India)	Baljit Sahni	1	1	Missed a game against Goa (red card). (23 December 2017)
2	31	DF	(India)	Lalchhuanmawia	0	1	Missed a game against Bengaluru (red card). (14 December 2017)
3	10	FW	(Brazil)	Marcelinho	4	0	Missed a game against Chennai
4	5	DF	(India)	Adil Khan	1	0	
4	6	MF	(Spain)	Marcos Tebar	1	0	
4	9	FW	(Uruguay)	Emiliano Alfaro	1	0	
4	20	FW	(Brazil)	Diego Carlos	1	0	
4	22	MF	(India)	Ashique Kuruniyan	1	0	
4	49	DF	(Croatia)	Damir Grgič	1	0	
TOTALS					10	2	

Source: soccerway
Updated: 30 December 2017

== See also ==
- 2017–18 in Indian football
