= Tomasz Tchórz =

Polish football manager (born 1992)

Personal information
- Date of birth: 28 April 1992 (age 34)
- Place of birth: Lublin, Poland

Team information
- Current team: SC Delhi (manager)

Managerial career
- Years: Team
- 2024–2025: Kerala Blasters (interim)
- 2025–: SC Delhi

Tomasz Tchórz (born 28 April 1992) is a Polish professional football manager who manages Indian Super League club SC Delhi.

== Early life ==
Tchórz was born on 28 April 1992. Born in Lublin, Poland, he is a native of Izbica, Poland.

== Career ==
During the summer of 2018, Tchórz was appointed as an assistant manager of Lithuanian side Riteriai. The same year, he was hired in the same role at Polish side Wisła Płock. Following his stint there, he joined Indian side Mohun Bagan as an assistant in 2019.

In 2022, Tchórz was appointed manager of Indian side Kerala Blasters' youth sides. Indian news website The Bridge wrote in 2024 that he was "instrumental in developing key players like Mohammed Aimen... Vibin Mohanan, and Sachin Suresh" while managing the club.

Ahead of the 2025–26 season, Tchórz became manager of Indian Super League side SC Delhi.
