= Anuj Kumar (footballer) =

Indian footballer

Personal information
- Full name: Anuj Kumar
- Date of birth: 24 July 1998 (age 28)
- Place of birth: Eka, Uttar Pradesh, India
- Height: 1.87 m (6 ft 2 in)
- Position: Goalkeeper

Team information
- Current team: Churchill Brothers
- Number: 25

Youth career
- 2013–2015: AIFF Elite Academy
- 2015–2016: Pune
- 2016: Pune City

Senior career*
Years	Team	Apps	(Gls)
2017–2019	Pune City	0	(0)
2019–2024	Hyderabad	3	(0)
2020	→ Indian Arrows (loan)	0	(0)
2020–2021	→ Real Kashmir (loan)	2	(0)
2021–2022	→ Aizawl (loan)	10	(0)
2024–2026	Odisha	4	(0)
2026–	Churchill Brothers	0	(0)
- * Club domestic league appearances and goals as of 19:30, 16 May 2026 (UTC)

Anuj Kumar (born 24 July 1998) is an Indian professional footballer who plays as a goalkeeper for Indian Super League club Churchill Brothers.

== Club career ==
=== Early life and youth career ===
Born in Eka, Uttar Pradesh, Anuj started playing school football after his family moved to Delhi. Later, he joined Bhaichung Bhutia Football Schools and the AIFF Elite Academy.

In 2015, he joined Pune FC and played Youth League with Pune FC Academy team.

=== Pune City ===
After Pune FC dissolved in 2016, Anuj joined Indian Super League club Pune City. He won the 2017 IFA Shield with Pune City U19. He made the match-winning save against AIFF Elite Academy in semi-final penalty shoot-out.

Anuj was included in the Pune City senior team squad for the 2017–18 and 2018–19 ISL seasons, but didn't make any appearances.

=== Hyderabad ===
In 2019, Anuj joined newly formed Hyderabad ahead of the 2019–20 Indian Super League, later loaned out to Indian Arrows in mid-season transfer window. On 30 September 2020, he signed a two-year extension with the club. On 9 November 2022, he made his ISL debut as a substitute for Laxmikant Kattimani in a 0–1 away win against Jamshedpur.

==== Loan to Real Kashmir ====
On 2 November 2020, he was loaned out to Real Kashmir. On 5 March 2021, Anuj made his I-League debut against Churchill Brothers.

==== Loan to Aizwal ====
On 21 August 2021, Anuj joined I-League side Aizawl on a season-long loan deal. He made 10 appearances for the club in 2021–22 I-League.

=== Odisha ===
On 5 February 2024, Odisha announced the signing of Anuj on a two-year contract.

== International career ==
Anuj was a part of India under-16s which won the 2013 SAFF U-16 Championship.

== Honours ==
India U16

- SAFF U-16 Championship: 2013<

ref name="sfu16"/>
