= Tarif Akhand =

Indian footballer (born 1998)

Personal information
- Date of birth: 11 June 1998 (age 28)
- Place of birth: West Bengal, India
- Height: 1.74 m (5 ft 8 1/2 in)
- Position: Defender

Team information
- Current team: RoundGlass Punjab

Youth career
- Pune

Senior career*
Years	Team	Apps	(Gls)
2017–2019	Chennai City	13	(0)
2018	→ Pune City B (loan)	7	(0)
2019–2020	Hyderabad	1	(0)
2020	→ Chennai City (loan)	4	(0)
2021	Chennai City	9	(0)
2021	Kenkre	6	(0)
2021–2022	Rajasthan United	8	(0)
2022–	RoundGlass Punjab	0	(0)
- * Club domestic league appearances and goals as of 17:19, 26 April 2022 (UTC)

Tarif Akhand (Bengali: তারিফ আখন্দ; born 11 June 1998) is an Indian professional footballer who plays as a defender for I-League club RoundGlass Punjab.

== Club career ==
Akhand began his career in the youth system of I-League club Pune. He soon left the club to join Chennai City. He made his professional debut for the club in the I-League on 2 January 2018 against Mohun Bagan. He started and played the whole match as Chennai City won 2–1.

After the 2017–18 I-League concluded, Akhand was loaned to Pune City Reserves in the I-League 2nd Division.

=== Hyderabad ===
Prior to the 2019–20 season, it was announced that Akhand had signed with Hyderabad of the Indian Super League. He made his club debut on 2 November 2019 against Kerala Blasters. Akhand came on as an 88th-minute substitute for Robin Singh as Hyderabad won 2–1.

On 5 January 2020, Akhand was loaned out to Chennai City. He made his debut for the club four days later on 9 January against Gokulam Kerala. He started and played just 38 minutes as Chennai City won 3–2.

=== Rajasthan United ===
On 16 December 2021, Akhand agreed to join Rajasthan United on a season-long deal.

On 21 March 2022, he made his debut for the club against Churchill Brothers, in a 2–0 win.

== Career statistics ==
=== Club ===
As of 26 April 2022

Club	Season	League			Cup		AFC		Total	
Club	Season	Division	Apps	Goals	Apps	Goals	Apps	Goals	Apps	Goals
Chennai City	2017–18	I-League	8	0	0	0	—		8	0
Chennai City	2018–19	I-League	5	0	3 (Note: Appearance(s) in Super Cup)	0	—		8	0
Chennai City	Chennai City total		13	0	3	0	0	0	16	0
Pune City B (loan)	2017–18	I-League 2nd Division	7	0	0	0	—		7	0
Hyderabad	2019–20	Indian Super League	1	0	0	0	—		1	0
Chennai City (loan)	2019–20	I-League	4	0	0	0	—		4	0
Chennai City	2020–21	I-League	9	0	0	0	—		9	0
Kenkre	2021	I-League 2nd Division	6	0	0	0	—		6	0
Rajasthan; United	2021–22	I-League	8	0	0	0	—		8	0
RoundGlass; Punjab	2022–23	I-League	0	0	0	0	—		0	0
Career total			48	0	3	0	0	0	51	0

== Honours ==
Chennai City

- I-League: 2018–19
