= Rohit Kumar (footballer) =

Indian footballer (born 1997)

Personal information
- Date of birth: 1 April 1997 (age 29)
- Place of birth: New Delhi, India
- Height: 1.85 m (6 ft 1 in)
- Position: Midfielder

Team information
- Current team: East Bengal

Youth career
- Bhaichung Bhutia Football Schools
- DSK Shivajians LFC Academy

Senior career*
Years	Team	Apps	(Gls)
2016–2017	DSK Shivajians	6	(0)
2017–2019	Pune City	21	(2)
2019–2020	Hyderabad	9	(1)
2020–2021	Kerala Blasters	11	(0)
2021–2024	Bengaluru	41	(3)
2024–2026	Odisha	27	(0)
2026–	East Bengal	0	(0)

International career^{‡}
2015	India U19	2	(0)
2023	India	12	(0)
Medal record
Men's football
Representing India
SAFF Championship
Winner	2023 India
- * Club domestic league appearances and goals as of 21:23, 21 May 2026 (UTC) ‡ National team caps and goals as of 16:40, 14 June 2023 (UTC)

Rohit Kumar (born 1 April 1997) is an Indian professional footballer who plays as a midfielder for Indian Super League club East Bengal.

== Club career ==
=== Early career ===
Born in Delhi, Kumar represented and captained Delhi in the B.C. Roy Trophy in 2013. He soon joined the academy of DSK Shivajians. He also played for the DSK Shivajians B side in local league matches.

=== DSK Shivajians ===
In August 2016 it was announced that Kumar was called up to the DSK Shivajians senior side for the 2016 Durand Cup. He scored his first goal for the senior side nine minutes into his debut in the club's first match of the Durand Cup on 28 August 2016 against Sporting Goa. His goal was the first as DSK Shivajians won 2–1. He then scored a brace in the side's next match against Gangtok Himalayan as DSK Shivajians once again won 2–1. He then scored again in the very next match against Indian Navy. His 36th-minute goal was the equalizer for DSK Shivajians as they drew the match 3–3.

Kumar then made his professional debut for the club in the I-League on 14 January 2017 against East Bengal. He came on as an 87th-minute substitute for Gouramangi Singh as DSK Shivajians were defeated 2–1.

=== FC Pune City ===
Rohit made his professional debut for FC Pune City in the Indian Super League on 22 November 2017 against Delhi Dynamos FC. The very next match against ATK on 26 November 2017 in Kolkata he scored his first ISL goal for the club, which resulted in FC Pune City winning the match 4–1. His second goal also came against ATK in the 77th minute at the home ground of FC Pune City at the Shree Shiv Chhatrapati Sports Complex.

=== Hyderabad FC ===
He was signed by Hyderabad FC in 2019. He played in 9 matches and scored a goal during his only season at the club.

=== Kerala Blasters FC ===
On 26 August 2020, Kerala Blasters FC announced signing of Rohit from Hyderabad. He went on to play 11 matches for Kerala Blasters in the following season.

=== Bengaluru FC ===
On 29 July 2021, Bengaluru FC announced the signing of Rohit on a two-year contract. He has committed to the club until the conclusion of the 2024–25 season.

== International career ==
Kumar has represented the India under-19s.

On 14 March 2023, Kumar was called up to the Indian senior squad for the first time. He made his debut against Kyrgyzstan on 28 March, replacing Anirudh Thapa after 67 minutes in a 2–0 victory.

== Career statistics ==
=== Club ===
As of 14 March 2024

Club	Season	League			Cup		AFC		Total	
Club	Season	Division	Apps	Goals	Apps	Goals	Apps	Goals	Apps	Goals
DSK Shivajians	2016–17	I-League	6	0	3 (Note: Appearance(s) in Federation Cup)	0	—		9	0
Pune City	2017–18	Indian Super League	14	2	1 (Note: Appearance(s) in Super Cup)	0	—		15	2
Pune City	2018–19	Indian Super League	7	0	2	0	—		9	0
Pune City	Pune City total		21	2	3	0	0	0	24	2
Hyderabad	2019–20	Indian Super League	9	1	0	0	—		9	1
Kerala Blasters	2020–21	Indian Super League	11	0	0	0	—		11	0
Bengaluru	2021–22	Indian Super League	9	0	0	0	2 (Note: Appearance(s) in AFC Cup)	0	11	0
Bengaluru	2022–23	Indian Super League	19	3	11 (Note: Appearance(s) in Durand Cup)	0	—		30	3
Bengaluru	2023–24	Indian Super League	13	0	2	0	—		15	0
Bengaluru	Bengaluru total		41	3	13	0	2	0	56	3
Odisha	2024–25	Indian Super League	0	0	0	0	—		0	0
Career total			88	6	19	0	2	0	109	6

=== International ===
As of 4 July 2023

National team	Year	Apps	Goals
India	2023	12	0
Total		12	0

== Honours ==
Bengaluru

- Durand Cup: 2022

India

- SAFF Championship: 2023
- Tri-Nation Series: 2023
- Intercontinental Cup: 2023
