= Gurtej Singh =

Indian footballer (born 1989)

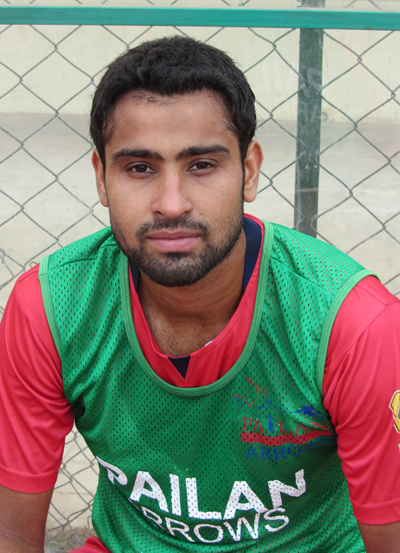
- Singh with Pailan Arrows in 2012

Personal information
- Date of birth: 18 December 1989 (age 36)
- Place of birth: Punjab, India
- Height: 1.81 m (5 ft 11 1/2 in)
- Position: Centre-back

Team information
- Current team: Delhi
- Number: 3

Senior career*
| Years | Team | Apps | (Gls) |
| 2010–2011 | JCT | | |
| 2011–2012 | Pailan Arrows | | |
| 2012–2013 | Churchill Brothers | 3 | (0) |
| 2013–2015 | Bengaluru | 5 | (0) |
| 2016–2017 | Fateh Hyderabad | 16 | (0) |
| 2017–2019 | Pune City | 29 | (1) |
| 2019–2020 | Hyderabad | 13 | (0) |
| 2020–2021 | East Bengal | 0 | (0) |
| 2021 | → Mohammedan (loan) | 6 | (0) |
| 2021–2022 | RoundGlass Punjab | 3 | (0) |
| 2023– | Delhi | 11 | (0) |
- * Club domestic league appearances and goals as of 22:02, 26 May 2023 (UTC)

Gurtej Singh "Nanna" (born 18 December 1989) is an Indian professional footballer who plays as a defender for I-League club Delhi.

== Personal life ==
Born and brought up in Ropar (now known as Rupnagar) in Punjab, Gurtej took interest in football in the sixth grade, thanks to his father. A fan of Jagatjit Cotton & Textile Football Club (JCT), Gurtej's father took him to the stadiums. Singh would attend matches of JCT and enjoyed watching Baichung Bhutia and I.M. Vijayan play.

Representing his school, Gurtej played at the Challenge Cup tournament in Sector 42 of Chandigarh, aged 15. At the tournament were kids from Football Academy, Mahilpur, a renowned centre of learning which has produced several well-known players. At the end of one of the matches in the competition, Gurtej was approached by coach Hassan Ali for trials in what was to be the start of his professional football career. Now Gurtej works in Ace Pipeline.

== Career ==
=== Early career ===
Born in Punjab, Singh started his professional career with JCT FC of the I-League where he scored one goal for the club on 15 May 2011 in a league match against Chirag United in which he found the net in the 59th minute to give JCT their equalizer and a final 2–2 draw. After spending the season with JCT's first team, after the club disbanded at the end of the 2010–11 season, Singh signed with the Pailan Arrows.

=== Churchill Brothers ===
After spending one season with Pailan Arrows, Singh signed for former I-League champions, Churchill Brothers. He then made his debut for the club on 17 November 2012 in a league match against East Bengal at the Fatorda Stadium in which he came on in the 81st minute for Tomba Singh as Churchill Brothers lost the match 0–3.

Singh then made his international club debut on 1 May 2013 in the AFC Cup against Semen Padang in which he came on in the 49th minute for Steven Dias as Churchill Brothers lost the match 1–3.

=== Bengaluru FC ===
On 8 July 2013 it was confirmed that Singh had signed for new direct-entry I-League side Bengaluru FC. In 2015, he was released by Bengaluru FC.

=== Fateh Hyderabad AFC ===
After Bengaluru FC, he joined Fateh Hyderabad Associated Football Club which plays in I-League 2nd Division tournament based at Hyderabad, Telangana, India.

Singh was the captain at Fateh Hyderabad.

=== FC Pune City ===
On 23 July 2017, Singh was picked up by FC Pune City for 2017–18 ISL season.

Singh made his debut for Pune City in their opening fixture against Delhi Dynamos, which Pune lost 2–3.

Singh was a first team regular at FC Pune City. Playing in the centre-back position, Singh was vital in the defensive unit of Pune, making 109 clearances in the 18 matches played. His first goal for Pune City came on 24 January 2018 during their home fixture against Jamshedpur FC. Singh's equaliser from a corner in the 62nd minute helped Pune win the match 2–1.

Pune made it to the semi-finals, their best performance since the inception of the tournament, where they were knocked out by Bengaluru FC.

== Career statistics ==
=== Club ===
As of 26 May 2023

| Club | Season | League | | | Cup | | AFC | | Total | |
| Club | Season | Division | Apps | Goals | Apps | Goals | Apps | Goals | Apps | Goals |
|---|---|---|---|---|---|---|---|---|---|---|
| Churchill Brothers | 2012–13 | I-League | 3 | 0 | 0 | 0 | 1 (Note: Appearance(s) in AFC Cup) | 0 | 4 | 0 |
| Bengaluru | 2013–14 | I-League | 3 | 0 | 0 | 0 | — | | 3 | 0 |
| Bengaluru | 2014–15 | I-League | 2 | 0 | 0 | 0 | 4 | 0 | 6 | 0 |
| Bengaluru | Bengaluru total | | 5 | 0 | 0 | 0 | 4 | 0 | 9 | 0 |
| Fateh Hyderabad | 2016–17 | I-League 2nd Division | 16 | 0 | 0 | 0 | — | | 16 | 0 |
| Pune City | 2017–18 | Indian Super League | 18 | 1 | 1 (Note: Appearance(s) in Super Cup) | 0 | — | | 19 | 1 |
| Pune City | 2018–19 | Indian Super League | 11 | 0 | 2 | 0 | — | | 13 | 0 |
| Pune City | Pune City total | | 29 | 1 | 3 | 0 | 0 | 0 | 32 | 1 |
| Hyderabad | 2019–20 | Indian Super League | 13 | 0 | 0 | 0 | — | | 13 | 0 |
| East Bengal | 2020–21 | Indian Super League | 0 | 0 | 0 | 0 | — | | 0 | 0 |
| Mohammedan (loan) | 2020–21 | I-League | 6 | 0 | 0 | 0 | — | | 6 | 0 |
| RoundGlass Punjab | 2021–22 | I-League | 3 | 0 | 0 | 0 | — | | 3 | 0 |
| Delhi | 2022–23 | I-League 2 | 11 | 0 | 0 | 0 | — | | 11 | 0 |
| Delhi | 2023–24 | I-League | 0 | 0 | 0 | 0 | — | | 0 | 0 |
| Delhi | Delhi total | | 11 | 0 | 0 | 0 | 0 | 0 | 11 | 0 |
| Career total | | | 86 | 1 | 3 | 0 | 5 | 0 | 94 | 1 |

== Honours ==
Churchill Brothers

- I-League: 2012–13

Bengaluru

- I-League: 2013–14
- Federation Cup: 2014–15
