= Xavi Gurri =

Spanish football player/manager

Personal information
- Full name: Xavier Gurri López
- Date of birth: 18 April 1970 (age 56)
- Place of birth: Montornès del Vallès, Spain
- Position: Defender

Youth career
- –1988: Granollers

Senior career*
Years	Team	Apps	(Gls)
1988–1992	Granollers	98	(0)
1992	Manlleu		
1992–1993	Palafrugell	25	(1)
1993–1996	Girona	100	(0)
1996–1997	Mataró	17	(0)
1997–2000	Granollers	73	(2)

Managerial career
- 2000–2003: Espanyol (youth)
- 2003–2004: Granollers (youth)
- 2005–2007: Canovelles
- 2007–2008: Gramenet B
- 2008–2009: Mollet
- 2009: Sant Celoni
- 2009–2010: Cornellà (youth)
- 2010–2011: Canovelles
- 2011: Granollers
- 2011–2012: Gramenet
- 2012–2013: Mollet
- 2014–2016: Al Wahda (assistant)
- 2018: Honka U17
- 2018–2019: Egypt (assistant)
- 2019: Honka U17
- 2020: Hyderabad (assistant)
- 2020: Hyderabad (interim)
- 2021–2022: Monterrey (assistant)
- 2023: Monterrey U23
- * Club domestic league appearances and goals

Xavier "Xavi" Gurri López (born 18 April 1970) is a Spanish retired footballer who played as a defender, and the current manager of Mexican club CF Monterrey's under-20 team.

== Playing career ==
Born in Montornès del Vallès, Barcelona, Catalonia, Gurri never player in any higher than Segunda División B during his entire career, representing mainly EC Granollers and Girona FC. He retired in 2000 with Granollers.

== Coaching career ==
After retiring, Gurri took up coaching, working at RCD Espanyol and Granollers' youth setups. His first senior experience came with UE Canovelles in 2005, and he subsequently managed UDA Gramenet's reserves, CF Mollet, and CE Sant Celoni before returning to youth football with UE Cornellà.

Gurri then worked for former sides Canovelles, Granollers, Gramenet and Mollet before moving abroad in 2014, joining Javier Aguirre's staff at Al Wahda FC. In 2018, he also had a brief stint coaching the under-17 squad of Finnish side FC Honka before reuniting with Aguirre in the Egypt national team.

In 2019, Gurri returned to Honka's under-17s, but left in the end of the year to work as an assistant manager of Indian Super League side Hyderabad FC. In January 2020, he was named interim manager of the latter club after the sacking of Phil Brown.

Ahead of the 2020–21 campaign, Gurri was named Albert Roca's assistant.
