= Mohammad Yasir =

Indian footballer

Personal information
- Full name: Mohammad Yasir
- Date of birth: 14 April 1998 (age 28)
- Place of birth: Imphal, Manipur, India
- Height: 1.69 m (5 ft 7 in)
- Position: Winger

Team information
- Current team: Kerala Blasters

Youth career
- 2015–2016: Pune
- 2016–2017: Pune City

Senior career*
Years	Team	Apps	(Gls)
2017–2018	Goa	0	(0)
2017–2018	Goa B	7	(1)
2018–2019	Pune City	1	(0)
2019–2024	Hyderabad	80	(6)
2024	→ Goa (loan)	7	(2)
2024–2026	Goa	33	(3)
2026–	Kerala Blasters	0	(0)

International career^{‡}
2021–2023	India	13	(0)
Medal record
Men's football
Representing India
SAFF Championship
Winner	2021 Maldives
- * Club domestic league appearances and goals as of 16:54, 18 May 2026 (UTC) ‡ National team caps and goals as of 17:23, 23 March 2022 (UTC)

Mohammed Yasir (born 22 April 1998) is an Indian professional footballer who plays as a winger for Indian Super League club Kerala Blasters.

== Club career ==
Born in Manipur, Yasir began his career representing his home state in the National School Games in 2014. In 2015, Yasir joined the Pune academy and then the Pune City academy in 2016. While with Pune City, he captained the under-19 side which won the IFA Shield in June 2017.

=== Goa ===
On 23 July 2017, Yasir was selected in the 14th round of the 2017–18 ISL Players Draft by Goa for the 2017–18 Indian Super League where he managed to get only to bench on 2 occasions. Yasir made his debut for the Goa Reserves in a 1–0 loss to Salgaocar in first match of inaugural AWES Cup. He represented the reserves for most of the season in Goa Professional League and I-League 2nd Division. Yasir made his professional debut for the club on 16 April 2018 in their Super Cup semi-final match against East Bengal. He came on as an 82nd-minute substitute as Goa lost 1–0.

=== Pune City ===
On 7 December 2018, Yasir returned to Pune City and made his debut in Indian Super League as he started the last match for Pune City against Mumbai City.

=== Hyderabad ===
Yasir made his debut for Hyderabad against Jamshedpur in a 3–1 loss. He won the emerging player award in the home game against Northeast United.

=== Goa ===
On 13 January 2024, Yasir returned to Goa on a loan spell. In March 2024, Yasir terminated his contract with Hyderabad, after being granted a provisional release by the player status committee of the AIFF, and signed permanently with FC Goa. He made seven league appearances for the club on loan.

== International career ==
On 25 March 2021, Yasir made his international debut for India against Oman in a friendly match, which ended as 1–1.

== Career statistics ==
=== Club ===
As of 18 May 2026

Club	Season	League			Cup		AFC		Other		Total	
Club	Season	Division	Apps	Goals	Apps	Goals	Apps	Goals	Apps	Goals	Apps	Goals
Goa	2017–18	Indian Super League	0	0	1 (Note: Appearance(s) in Super Cup)	0	—		—		1	0
Goa B	2017–18	I-League 2	7	1	—		—		13 (Note: 11 Appearances in Goa Professional League and 2 Appearances in AWES Cup)	5	20	6
Pune City	2018–19	Indian Super League	1	0	2	0	—		—		3	0
Hyderabad	2019–20	Indian Super League	15	1	—		—		—		15	1
Hyderabad	2020–21	Indian Super League	18	0	—		—		—		18	0
Hyderabad	2021–22	Indian Super League	16	1	—		—		—		16	1
Hyderabad	2022–23	Indian Super League	20	3	8 (Note: Appearance(s) in Durand Cup)	0	—		1 (Note: Appearance in Indian club qualifiers for 2023–24 AFC competitions)	0	29	3
Hyderabad	2023–24	Indian Super League	11	1	3	0	—		—		14	1
Hyderabad	Total		80	6	11	0	0	0	1	0	92	6
Goa (loan)	2023–24	Indian Super League	7	2	2	0	—		—		9	2
Goa	2023–24	Indian Super League	4	0	0	0	—		—		4	0
Goa	2024–25	Indian Super League	19	2	2	0	—		—		21	2
Goa	2025–26	Indian Super League	10	1	3	1	1	0	—		14	2
Goa	Total		33	3	5	1	1	0	0	0	39	4
Kerala Blasters	2026–27	Indian Super League	0	0	0	0	—		—		0	0
Career total			128	12	21	1	1	0	14	5	164	18

=== International ===
As of 22 March 2023

National team	Year	Apps	Goals
India	2021	8	0
India	2022	4	0
India	2023	1	0
Total		13	0

== Honours ==
India

- SAFF Championship: 2021
- Tri-Nation Series: 2023

Hyderabad FC

- Indian Super League: 2021–22
