= Damir Grgić (Croatian footballer) =

Croatian footballer

Personal information
- Date of birth: 18 May 1992 (age 34)
- Place of birth: Gladbeck, Germany
- Height: 1.94 m (6 ft 4 in)
- Position: Centre-back

Team information
- Current team: TuS Koblenz
- Number: 14

Youth career
- 2001-2010: Karlovac
- 2010–2011: Bochum B

Senior career*
Years	Team	Apps	(Gls)
2012–2013	SVL Flavia Solva	17	(9)
2013	SV Heiligenkreuz	15	(8)
2014	Austria Klagenfurt	11	(0)
2014	USV Mettersdorf	13	(4)
2015	Malchower SV	15	(2)
2015–2017	Rudar Velenje	40	(1)
2017	Pune City	3	(0)
2018	Aluminij	19	(2)
2019–2020	Inter Zaprešić	33	(1)
2021	Kastrioti	7	(0)
2022–	TuS Koblenz	58	(4)
- * Club domestic league appearances and goals as of 18 May 2024

Damir Grgić (born May 18, 1992) is a Croatian footballer who plays as a centre-back for TuS Koblenz in the German fifth-tier Oberliga Rheinland-Pfalz/Saar.

== Career ==
Grgić had spells in the NOFV Oberliga with Malchower SV and in Austria with four different teams. He joined TuS Koblenz in summer 2022 after stints in the top flights of Slovenia, India, Croatia and Albania.
