= Marcelinho (footballer, born June 1987) =

Brazilian footballer

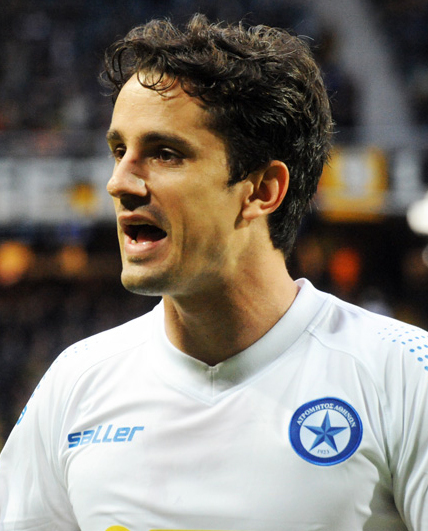
- Marcelinho with Atromitos in 2015

Personal information
- Full name: Marcelo Leite Pereira
- Date of birth: 22 June 1987 (age 39)
- Place of birth: Rio de Janeiro, Brazil
- Height: 1.73 m (5 ft 8 in)
- Positions: Winger; attacking midfielder

Youth career
- 2005: Flamengo

Senior career*
Years	Team	Apps	(Gls)
2006	Atlético Madrid B	2	(0)
2007–2008	Getafe B	8	(0)
2007	Vitória	4	(0)
2008	Tombense	0	(0)
2008	→ Ipatinga (loan)	10	(2)
2008–2009	Kalamata	14	(6)
2009–2013	Skoda Xanthi	103	(13)
2013–2014	Baniyas	11	(3)
2014–2015	Catania	9	(1)
2015–2016	Atromitos	25	(4)
2016	Anápolis	9	(1)
2016	Delhi Dynamos	15	(10)
2017	Avaí	0	(0)
2017–2019	Pune City	33	(16)
2019–2020	Hyderabad	17	(7)
2020–2021	Odisha	8	(0)
2021	→ Mohun Bagan (loan)	8	(2)
2021	Taubaté	2	(0)
2021	Rodos	1	(0)
2021–2022	Rajasthan United	0	(0)
2022	→ NorthEast United (loan)	8	(1)
2022	Sampaio Corrêa	0	(0)
Total		287	(66)
- * Club domestic league appearances and goals

Marcelo Leite Pereira (born 22 June 1987), known as Marcelinho, is a Brazilian former professional footballer who played as a winger or an attacking midfielder.

Having started his professional career with Spanish club Atlético Madrid B, Marcelinho has played for Brazilian, Spanish, Greek, Emirati and Indian clubs. He amassed more than 100 caps with Greek club Skoda Xanthi. His Major Club career success came in India at ISL as he finished 2016 Indian Super League as the league's top scorer and won the Golden Boot with Delhi Dyanamos. Then he went on to play for Pune City in the ISL in 2017–18 and 2018–19 season.

== Club career ==
Born in Rio de Janeiro, Marcelinho started his senior professional career at the age of 18 with the reserves of Atlético Madrid, followed by a stint with Getafe CF B. In 2008, he signed a contract with Kalamata. After a few months there he signed a contract with Skoda Xanthi and he stayed there for four years and then he signed with Baniyas in UAE, for a fee of €600,000. At Skoda Xanthi, Marcelinho played 115 games( 17 goals, 14 assists) in all competitions.

In March 2014 Sky Sport reported that Marcelinho had signed a one-year contract (with an option for two additional years) with Catania. Eventually, on 12 July 2014, it was officially announced that Marcelinho signed a one-year contract with Catania on a free transfer.

On 18 January 2015, he signed with Atromitos F.C. on a 1 1/2-year contract. On 30 July 2015, in a game for UEFA Europa League preliminary round against AIK, he was the man of the match having one assist, a goal and a drawn penalty, in a victorious 3–1 away win. On 4 February 2016, he mutually agreed with the club to rescind his contract.

On 25 August 2016, Marcelinho switched to the Indian Super League with Delhi Dynamos FC. Head coach Gianluca Zambrotta said that his experience would help the team. On 6 October, he made his first team debut, scoring a brace in a 3–1 victory against Chennaiyin FC. On 27 November, he scored a hat-trick in a 5–1 routing of FC Goa. He also scored found the net in a 2–1 victory against Kerala Blasters in the semi-finals. He ended the season as the league's top scorer with 10 goals and subsequently won the Golden Boot.

On 16 January 2017, Marcelinho signed with Brazilian top tier club Avaí FC. In August, he returned to the Indian Super League with FC Pune City. On 26 November, he scored a brace in a 4–1 victory against ATK. On 30 December, he scored a hat-trick against NorthEast United FC as his side won by 5–0.

On 2 September 2020, Marcelinho joined ISL club Odisha FC for the 2020–21 Indian Super League.

On 26 January 2021, He swapped club with Brad Inman and joined ATK Mohun Bagan FC on loan till the end of 2020–21 Indian Super League season. He scored his first goal in debut for ATK Mohun Bagan.

On 23 April 2021, Marcelinho joined Esporte Clube Taubaté that competes in the Campeonato Paulista Série A2, the second tier of the São Paulo State league.

On 6 January 2022, Marcelinho joined NorthEast United from Rajasthan United on loan deal till the end of 2021–22 Indian Super League season. He made his debut against Chennaiyin on 21 January, which ended in a 2–1 loss as a substitute for Laldanmawia Ralte in the 64th minute of the game.

== Style of play ==
Mainly a left winger, Marcelinho can also play on the right wing. Since his youth days, he has been playing as a winger or as a second striker. In an interview, he said that he considered "a wide position to be his favourite on the pitch" because it gave him space to run.

== Personal life ==
He is married to Juliana. They parent Giovanna (born 15 November 2013) and Enrico (born 6 December 2017).

== Career statistics ==
As of 25 February 2022

Appearances and goals by club, season and competition
Club	Season	League			Cup		Other		Total	
Club	Season	Division	Apps	Goals	Apps	Goals	Apps	Goals	Apps	Goals
Atlético Madrid B	2006–07	Segunda División B	3	0	—		—		3	0
Skoda Xanthi	2009–10	Super League Greece	19	2		1	—		19	3
Skoda Xanthi	2010–11	Super League Greece	26	5	1	0	—		27	5
Skoda Xanthi	2011–12	Super League Greece	29	3	2	1	—		31	4
Skoda Xanthi	2012–13	Super League Greece	26	3	2	0	—		28	3
Skoda Xanthi	2013–14	Super League Greece	4	0	0	0	4 (Note: Appearances in UEFA Europa League)	2	8	2
Skoda Xanthi	Total		107	13	5	2	4	2	116	16
Baniyas	2013–14	UAE Arabian Gulf League	11	3	4	0	—		15	3
Catania	2014–15	Serie B	9	1	1	0	—		10	1
Atromitos	2014–15	Super League Greece	14	4	0	0	—		14	4
Atromitos	2015–16	Super League Greece	11	0	2	0	4	2	17	2
Atromitos	Total		45	8	2	0	4	2	51	10
Anápolis	2016	Série D	0	0	0	0	9 (Note: Appearances in Campeonato Goiano)	1	9	1
Delhi Dynamos	2016	Indian Super League	15	10	—		—		15	10
Avaí	2017	Série A	0	0	0	0	5 (Note: Appearances in Primeira Liga (Brazil) and Campeonato Catarinense)	0	5	0
Pune City	2017–18	Indian Super League	17	8	1	1	—		18	9
Pune City	2018–19	Indian Super League	14	6	1	1	—		15	7
Hyderabad	2019–20	Indian Super League	17	7	—		—		17	7
Odisha	2020–21	Indian Super League	8	0	—		—		8	0
Mohun Bagan (loan)	2020–21	Indian Super League	8	2	—		—		8	2
Taubaté	2021	Série A2	2	0	—		—		2	0
Rodos	2021–22	Super League Greece 2	1	0	—		—		1	0
Rajasthan United	2021–22	I-League	0	0	—		—		0	0
NorthEast United (loan)	2021–22	Indian Super League	8	1	—		—		8	1
Career total			242	55	14	4	22	5	278	64

== Honours ==
Individual

- Indian Super League Golden Boot: 2016
