= Jonatan Lucca =

Brazilian footballer (born 1994)

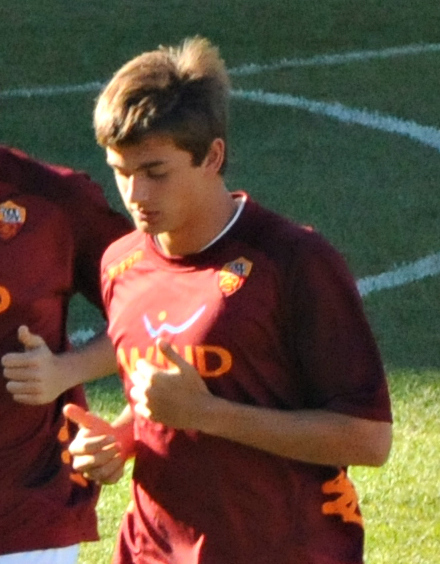
- Lucca with Roma in 2012

Personal information
- Full name: Jonatan Lucca
- Date of birth: 2 June 1994 (age 32)
- Place of birth: Santa Maria, Rio Grande do Sul, Brazil
- Height: 1.84 m (6 ft 0 in)
- Position: Midfielder

Team information
- Current team: Brusque

Youth career
- Santo Ângelo
- 2012: Internacional
- 2012–2015: Roma

Senior career*
Years	Team	Apps	(Gls)
2012–2015	Roma	0	(0)
2014	→ Athletico Paranaense (loan)	14	(3)
2015–2016	Athletico Paranaense	11	(0)
2015	→ Guaratinguetá (loan)	13	(2)
2015	→ FC Goa (loan)	16	(3)
2016	Kelantan	8	(0)
2016	Pune City	14	(0)
2017	Bnei Sakhnin	0	(0)
2017–2018	Pune City	20	(2)
2018–2020	B-SAD	34	(3)
2020–2022	Farense	55	(1)
2023	Stabæk	17	(0)
2023–2025	AVS	32	(3)
2025	Pakhtakor	8	(0)
2026–	Brusque	13	(0)
- * Club domestic league appearances and goals as of 2 October 2026

Jonatan Lucca (born 2 June 1994) is a Brazilian professional footballer who plays as a midfielder, for Série C club Brusque.

== Career ==
=== A.S. Roma ===
Lucca was signed by Italian team Roma from Brazilian side Internacional in July 2012 under Czech manager Zdenek Zeman. While he never appeared during the season in the league, he was a fairly regular substitute for the Italian side during the 2012–13, being named on the bench during 13 Serie A games. Failing to gain any game time, he was loaned out to Brazilian side Athletico Paranaense during 2014.

=== Athletico Paranaense ===
Lucca made his senior debut in the Paraná state league in the Campeonato Paranaense in 2014, where he made four appearances before he was signed on a permanent basis by Athletico Paranaense in July 2015. He continued to play in Paraná in 2015 where he made five appearances. He was one of thirteen of Athletico's players loaned out to Brazilian third-division side Guaratinguetá in the Campeonato Brasileiro Série C, where he finally made his senior professional league debut, and went on to make three appearances.

=== Asia ===
Lucca was loaned out to Indian Super League club FC Goa under Zico for the 2015 Indian Super League.

He was seen at Kuala Lumpur International Airport and later was confirmed to be Kelantan new signing. On 2 June, his contract was terminated by Kelantan and the announcement was made by KAFA president after head coach Velizar Popov does not have plans for the duo Jonatan Lucca and Dramane Traore in the second half of the season.

On 24 August 2017, Lucca returned to Indian Super League with FC Pune City after a brief stint with Israeli club Bnei Sakhnin. On 23 November, he made his debut, starting in a 2–3 defeat against Delhi Dynamos FC. One month later, he scored his first goal in a 2-0 victory against FC Goa. On 11 March, he scored a free kick goal against Bengaluru FC but his side lost 3-1 on aggregate.

=== Portugal ===
On 6 June 2018, Lucca moved to Portuguese club B-SAD on a three-year contract. In January 2020 he moved on to Farense, contesting the 2020–21 Primeira Liga.

=== Norway ===
After some months without a club, Lucca signed for Norwegian Eliteserien club Stabæk.

=== Return to Portugal ===
On 30 August 2023, recently founded Liga Portugal 2 club AVS SAD announced the signing of Lucca on a season-long contract. He made his debut three days later, coming off the bench for Ricardo Dias in the 68th minute of a 2–1 away win at União de Leiria.

=== Pakhtakor ===
On 12 January 2025, Lucca signed a one-year contract with Uzbekistan Super League club Pakhtakor. On 7 July 2025, Pakhtakor announced that they had ended their contract with Lucca by mutual consent.

== Personal life ==
Lucca's brother, Cristian Lucca, is also a professional footballer.

== Honours ==
Roma

- Coppa Italia runner-up: 2012–13

Goa

- Indian Super League runner-up: 2015
