= Néstor Gordillo =

Spanish footballer

Personal information
- Full name: Néstor Jesús Gordillo Benítez
- Date of birth: 22 August 1989 (age 37)
- Place of birth: Las Palmas, Spain
- Height: 1.70 m (5 ft 7 in)
- Position: Attacking midfielder

Team information
- Current team: Arucas

Youth career
- Unión Viera
- 2007–2008: Tenerife

Senior career*
Years	Team	Apps	(Gls)
2008–2009	Tenerife C	?	(7)
2008–2009	Tenerife B	1	(0)
2009–2011	Huracán	49	(6)
2011	Azuqueca	13	(2)
2011–2012	Las Palmas C	?	(9)
2011–2013	Las Palmas B	60	(23)
2013–2014	Vecindario	20	(4)
2014–2016	Guijuelo	34	(5)
2015	→ Las Palmas B (loan)	15	(6)
2016	Atlético Madrid B	20	(8)
2016–2017	Guijuelo	30	(0)
2017–2018	Cornellà	22	(1)
2018–2019	Chennai City	22	(9)
2019–2020	Hyderabad	9	(1)
2021	KKS 1925 Kalisz	20	(10)
2021	Arka Gdynia	5	(0)
2022–2025	KKS 1925 Kalisz	108	(32)
2025–	Arucas	0	(0)
- * Club domestic league appearances and goals as of 15:18, 12 June 2025 (UTC)

Néstor Jesús Gordillo Benítez (born 22 August 1989) is a Spanish professional footballer who plays as attacking midfielder for Tercera Federación club Arucas.

== Club career ==
Born in Las Palmas, Gordillo finished his graduation from the youth academy of CD Tenerife. After making his debut with CD Tenerife C in 2008, he went on to represent lower division clubs namely CD Tenerife B, AD Huracán, CD Azuqueca, UD Las Palmas C, UD Las Palmas Atlético and UD Vecindario.

On 31 January 2014, Gordillo signed for Segunda División B club CD Guijuelo. On 23 March, he scored his first goal for the club in a 3–1 victory over SD Noja. On 28 January 2015, he returned to his former club UD Las Palmas Atlético on a loan deal for the remainder of the season.

On 4 January 2016, Gordillo switched to Tercera División side Atlético Madrid B. In the summer of 2016, a visa problem prevented him from signing for Indian Super League club ATK. He resigned for CD Guijuelo on 19 July. He was released at the end of the season. On 1 September 2017, he moved to fellow league club UE Cornellà.

On 13 June 2018, Gordillo moved abroad for the first time in his career and joined Indian I-League club Chennai City. On 26 October, he made his debut, assisting Pedro Manzi twice in a 4–1 triumph over Indian Arrows. On 1 November, he scored his first goal for the club in a 2–2 draw against Churchill Brothers.

On 1 October 2019, he moved to Hyderabad FC on a 2 year deal.

On 30 January 2021, Gordillo joined Polish third division club KKS 1925 Kalisz.

== Honours ==
Chennai City FC

- I-League: 2018–19

Individual

- Polish Cup top scorer: 2022–23
