= Kamaljit Singh =

Indian footballer

Personal information
- Full name: Kamaljit Singh
- Date of birth: 28 December 1995 (age 30)
- Place of birth: Gurdaspur, Punjab, India
- Height: 1.85 m (6 ft 1 in)
- Position: Goalkeeper

Team information
- Current team: Sreenidi Deccan

Youth career
- AIFF Elite Academy

Senior career*
Years	Team	Apps	(Gls)
2014–2016	Sporting Goa	0	(0)
2017	Minerva Punjab	2	(0)
2017–2019	Pune City	17	(0)
2019–2020	Hyderabad	12	(0)
2020–2022	Odisha	15	(0)
2022–2024	East Bengal	18	(0)
2024–2025	Odisha	0	(0)
2025	→ Kerala Blasters (loan)	1	(0)
2026–	Sreenidi Deccan	0	(0)

International career
2011–2015	India U19		
2014	India U23		
- * Club domestic league appearances and goals as of 12:35, 7 March 2026 (UTC)

Kamaljit Singh (born 28 December 1995) is an Indian professional footballer who plays as a goalkeeper for Indian Super League club Sreenidi Deccan.

== Career ==
Singh started his career with the AIFF Academy before signing for Sporting Clube de Goa in 2014. He made his debut for the side on 29 October 2014 against United in the Durand Cup. He played the full 90 minutes in goal as Sporting Goa won the match 3–2. He then made his official professional debut for the Goan club on 6 November 2014 during the Durand Cup semi-finals against Pune. He once again played the full-match in goal as Sporting Goa fell 1–2.

== International ==
Singh has represented the India U19 team during the Weifang Cup in 2011. Singh was also called up to the India U23 team for their 2014 Asian Games training camp. He was eventually named in the final roster for the Asian Games. Singh was also named on the bench for two matches against the United Arab Emirates U23 and Jordan U23 but he did not see any time during the tournament.

== Career statistics ==
=== Club ===
As of 25 February 2023

Club	Season	League			Cup		AFC		Total	
Club	Season	Division	Apps	Goals	Apps	Goals	Apps	Goals	Apps	Goals
Sporting Goa	2014–15	I-League	0	0	0	0	—		0	0
Sporting Goa	2015–16	I-League	0	0	0	0	—		0	0
Sporting Goa	Sporting Goa total		0	0	0	0	0	0	0	0
Minerva Punjab	2016–17	I-League	2	0	0	0	—		2	0
Pune City	2017–18	Indian Super League	3	0	0	0	—		3	0
Pune City	2017–18	Indian Super League	14	0	2 (Note: Appearance(s) in Super Cup)	0	—		16	0
Pune City	Pune City total		17	0	2	0	0	0	19	0
Hyderabad	2019–20	Indian Super League	12	0	0	0	—		12	0
Odisha	2020–21	Indian Super League	3	0	0	0	—		3	0
Odisha	2021–22	Indian Super League	12	0	0	0	—		12	0
Odisha	Odisha total		15	0	0	0	0	0	15	0
East Bengal	2022–23	Indian Super League	17	0	4 (Note: Appearance(s) in Durand Cup)	0	—		21	0
Career total			63	0	6	0	0	0	69	0

== Honours ==
India

- SAFF Championship runner-up: 2018
- King's Cup third place: 2019

India U23

- South Asian Games Silver medal: 2016
