= Abhishek Halder =

Indian footballer (born 1999)

Personal information
- Full name: Abhishek Halder
- Date of birth: 5 October 1999 (age 27)
- Place of birth: West Bengal, India
- Height: 1.76 m (5 ft 9 1/2 in)
- Position: Midfielder

Team information
- Current team: Forca Kochi

Youth career
- AIFF Academy

Senior career*
Years	Team	Apps	(Gls)
2017–2018	Indian Arrows	4	(0)
2018–2019	Pune City	2	(0)
2018	→ Pune City B (loan)	7	(0)
2019–2021	Hyderabad	12	(0)
2020	→ Hyderabad B (loan)	2	(1)
2021–2024	Mohammedan	20	(0)
2024–2025	Bengaluru United		
2025	Sribhumi		
2025–	Forca Kochi		

International career
2017	India U20	5	(1)
- * Club domestic league appearances and goals

Abhishek Halder (Bengali: অভিষেক হালদার; born 5 October 1999) is an Indian professional footballer who plays as a midfielder for the Super League Kerala club Forca Kochi.

== Career ==
Halder began his career as part of the FC Pune City Academy set up. In November 2017, Halder was selected to play for the Indian Arrows, an All India Football Federation-owned team that would consist of India under-20 players to give them playing time. He made his professional debut for the side on 18 December 2017 against Minerva Punjab. He started and played the whole match as Indian Arrows and lost 1–0.

=== Mohammedan ===
In December 2021, Mohammedan added Halder to their roster ahead of the 2021–22 I-League season. On 3 March, he made his debut for the club against Aizawl on the league's return after the COVID-19 breakout, in a 2–0 win.

In June 2022, Halder signed a new two-year deal with Mohammedan. He scored his first goal for the club on 21 August against Jamshedpur in the Durand Cup, which ended in a dominating 3–0 win. He played a 1–2 with Marcus Joseph to finish with a volley chipping over the keeper to double the lead.

== Career statistics ==
=== Club ===
As of 11 March 2023

Club	Season	League			Cup		AFC		Total	
Club	Season	Division	Apps	Goals	Apps	Goals	Apps	Goals	Apps	Goals
Indian Arrows	2017–18	I-League	4	0	0	0	—		4	0
Pune City	2018–19	Indian Super League	2	0	1 (Note: Appearance(s) in Super Cup)	0	—		3	0
Pune City B (loan)	2017–18	I-League 2nd Division	7	0	0	0	—		7	0
Hyderabad	2019–20	Indian Super League	8	0	0	0	—		8	0
Hyderabad	2020–21	Indian Super League	4	0	0	0	—		4	0
Hyderabad	Hyderabad total		12	0	0	0	0	0	12	0
Hyderabad B (loan)	2020	I-League 2nd Division	2	1	0	0	—		2	1
Mohammedan	2021–22	I-League	8	0	0	0	—		8	0
Mohammedan	2022–23	I-League	12	0	5 (Note: Appearance(s) in Durand Cup)	1	—		17	1
Mohammedan	Mohammedan total		20	0	5	1	0	0	25	1
Career total			47	1	6	1	0	0	53	2
