= Sahil Panwar =

Indian footballer (born 1999)

Personal information
- Full name: Sahil Panwar
- Date of birth: 15 December 1999 (age 26)
- Place of birth: Dehradun, Uttarakhand, India
- Height: 1.79 m (5 ft 10 1/2 in)
- Position: Left back

Youth career
- 2014–2016: Pune
- 2016–2018: Pune City

Senior career*
Years	Team	Apps	(Gls)
2018–2019	Pune City	22	(0)
2019–2021	Hyderabad	15	(0)
2021–2024	Odisha	33	(0)
2024–2025	Mumbai City	19	(0)
2026–	Mumbai City (Note: The club had initially released Panwar at the end of his previous contract, but later announced he had re-signed with the club. Both stints were independent of each other.)	5	(0)

International career^{‡}
2017–2018	India U20	5	(0)
- * Club domestic league appearances and goals as of 16:50, 18 April 2026 (UTC) ‡ National team caps and goals as of 05:38, 21 January 2018 (UTC)

Sahil Panwar (born 16 December 1999) is an Indian professional footballer who plays as a defender for Indian Super League club Mumbai City.

== Career ==
Born in Dehradun, Uttarakhand, Panwar was discovered by Pune while playing for his college, Maharana Pratap Sports College, during the Subroto Cup in 2014. While with the Pune F.C. Academy, Panwar captained the under-18 side.

=== Pune City ===
After the Pune F.C. Academy, He was sold to Indian Super League side Pune City, Panwar joined their academy. After spending time with the academy, Panwar was promoted to the first-team squad in December 2017. He made his professional debut for the club on 13 January 2018 against Chennaiyin. He started and played the whole match as Pune City were defeated 1–0.

=== Hyderabad ===
After Pune city FC got dissolved, Sahil Panwar joined newly formed franchise Hyderabad FC.

=== Odisha ===
On 14 May 2021, Sahil Panwar joined Odisha FC on a two-year contract, after Odisha agreed to pay an undisclosed transfer fee to Hyderabad FC.

=== Mumbai City FC ===
On 15 July 2024, Sahil signed for Mumbai City FC on a one-year contract. He made his debut on 13 September 2024 away against Mohun Bagan Super Giant, playing the full 90 minutes at left-back in an eventual 2–2 draw.

== International ==
Panwar has represented India at the under-20 level and was the captain of the side during the 2017 SAFF U-18 Championship.

== Personal life ==
Sahil married his longtime girlfriend Manasi Gurung in 2022.

== Career statistics ==
As of 22 February 2023

Club	Season	League			Cup		Continental		Total	
Club	Season	Division	Apps	Goals	Apps	Goals	Apps	Goals	Apps	Goals
Pune City	2017–18	Indian Super League	11	0	1 (Note: Appearance(s) in Super Cup)	0	—		12	0
Pune City	2018–19	Indian Super League	11	0	0	0	—		11	0
Pune City	Pune City total		22	0	1	0			23	0
Hyderabad	2019–20	Indian Super League	12	0	—		—		12	0
Hyderabad	2020–21	Indian Super League	3	0	—		—		3	0
Hyderabad	Hyderabad total		15	0	—		—		15	0
Odisha	2021–22	Indian Super League	13	0	—		—		13	0
Odisha	2022–23	Indian Super League	18	0	4 (Note: Appearance(s) in Durand Cup)	0	1 (Note: Appearance in playoff for AFC Cup)	0	23	0
Odisha	Odisha total		31	0	4	0	1	0	36	0
Career total			68	0	5	0	1	0	74	0
