= Marcos Tébar =

Spanish footballer (born 1986)

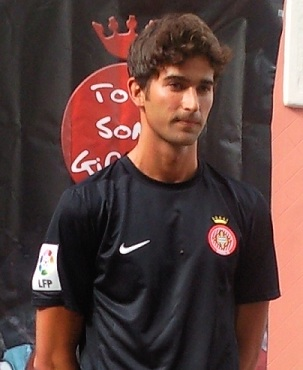
- Tébar as a Girona player

Personal information
- Full name: Marcos Tébar Ramiro
- Date of birth: 7 February 1986 (age 40)
- Place of birth: Madrid, Spain
- Height: 1.85 m (6 ft 1 in)
- Position: Midfielder

Youth career
- 1995–1998: Escuela Fútbol A.F.E
- 1998–2003: Real Madrid

Senior career*
Years	Team	Apps	(Gls)
2003–2005	Real Madrid C		
2003–2010	Real Madrid B	94	(4)
2006	→ Rayo Vallecano (loan)	17	(1)
2009–2010	Real Madrid	1	(0)
2010	→ Girona (loan)	9	(0)
2010–2013	Girona	114	(4)
2013–2014	Almería	25	(0)
2014–2015	Brentford	4	(0)
2016	Llagostera	20	(0)
2016	Delhi Dynamos	12	(0)
2017	Reus	9	(0)
2017–2018	Pune City	17	(1)
2018–2020	Odisha (Note: Delhi Dynamos changed its name to Odisha FC in 2019.)	30	(1)
Total		352	(11)

International career
2001–2002	Spain U16	5	(0)
2002–2003	Spain U17	7	(0)
Medal record
Representing Spain
Men's football
FIFA U-17 World Cup
Runner-up	2003 Finland
UEFA European Under-17 Championship
Runner-up	2003 Portugal
- * Club domestic league appearances and goals

Marcos Tébar Ramiro (born 7 February 1986) is a Spanish former professional footballer who played as a midfielder. A product of Real Madrid's academy, he made one senior appearance for the club before departing in 2010 for spells with Girona and UD Almería. He also had spells in England and India, before retiring in 2020.

== Club career ==
=== Real Madrid ===
Tébar was born in Madrid. A defensive midfielder, he signed for Spanish giants Real Madrid in 1998, at the age of 12. At just 16, Tébar was included in the first team squad for a friendly versus Sevilla in September 2002, and replaced Albert Celades during the first half of a 0–1 loss. He made his senior debuts with the C-team in 2003–04, in the Tercera División, also appearing with the reserves in the same campaign.

Tébar was called up for the main squad in November 2005 by Vanderlei Luxemburgo, for a La Liga match against Real Zaragoza. He remained unused in the eventual 1–0 win, and was also on the bench in a match against Getafe CF on 3 December, before being assigned back to Castilla. On 15 January 2006 Tébar made his debut as a professional, coming on as a second-half substitute in a 1–3 loss at CD Castellón in the Segunda División.

On 18 January 2006 Tébar joined city neighbours Rayo Vallecano on loan until June. He returned to Los Merengues in June, after appearing in 17 matches during the campaign and scoring his first senior goal on 19 March, netting the first of a 2–1 home win against Universidad de Las Palmas CF.

After returning from Rayo, Tébar appeared regularly with the B-side in the following three seasons, scoring his first professional goal on 9 September 2006, but in a 1–3 loss at Deportivo Alavés. On 30 May 2009, he was called up for the main squad by manager Juande Ramos, along with Javier Velayos and Gary Kagelmacher, for the final game of 2008–09 against CA Osasuna. He made his debut in the main category of Spanish football on the following day, replacing Kagelmacher in the 58th minute of an eventual 1–2 loss at the Estadio Reyno de Navarra.

In January 2010 Tébar moved to Girona FC on loan until June. In the summer, he started pre-season with Real Madrid under new boss José Mourinho, but left the club in August.

=== Girona ===
On 25 January 2010, Tébar joined Girona FC of the Segunda División on loan until June. He made his debut for the club late in the month, starting and playing the full 90 minutes of a 1–4 loss at FC Cartagena.

On 13 August Tébar returned to the Catalans on a permanent basis for three years, being sold for a mere €100. He was an essential midfield unit during his spell with the side, scoring his first goal on 1 September 2012 in a 1–0 home win over SD Ponferradina.

=== Almería ===
On 9 July 2013 Tébar joined UD Almería, recently returned to the top flight. He played his first game in the competition in four years on 19 August, starting in a 2–3 home loss to Villarreal CF.

On 9 June 2014 Tébar rescinded his link with the Andalusians, despite contributing with 29 appearances (16 starts, 1466 minutes of action).

=== Brentford ===
On 25 June 2014, Tébar signed for English Championship side Brentford on a two-year contract, with the option for a third. He made his debut for the club on the opening day of the 2014–15 season, as a half-time substitute for Moses Odubajo in a 1–1 draw with Charlton Athletic. He made five further appearances, starting three times, before falling behind Toumani Diagouraga and Jon Toral in the pecking order in late September. A thigh injury kept him out of the first team squad in November and December, before a brief return to the bench in January 2015. Manager Mark Warburton made Tébar available for loan in mid-March, but was concerned with the player's lack of match fitness putting off prospective takers. He made just six appearances during the 2014–15 season.

Tébar appeared in Brentford's 2015–16 pre-season matches, but missed the beginning of the season with a hamstring injury. Despite not being match fit, a high amount of injuries at the club saw him win his first call into a squad for the first time in 9 months when he was an unused substitute during a 2–1 victory over Preston North End on 19 September. Tébar's contract was terminated on 19 December 2015.

=== Later years ===
On 20 December 2015, Tébar joined Segunda División side UE Llagostera on a contract effective from the beginning of the January 2016 transfer window.

On 31 August 2016, Tébar signed with Indian Super League franchise Delhi Dynamos FC. On 31 January 2017, he joined Spanish second tier club CF Reus Deportiu before returning to India with FC Pune City on 4 August 2017. On 22 November, he made his debut in a 3–2 defeat against Delhi Dynamos FC, scoring a goal in the dying minutes of the match. On 10 August 2018, he resigned for Delhi Dynamos.

Tebar joined Odisha FC and captained the side in Indian Super League.

== International career ==
Tébar was capped for Spain at U16 and U17 level. Coming through in the same generation as Cesc Fàbregas and David Silva, Tébar was included the U17 squad for the U17 World Cup and the U17 European Championship in the summer of 2003, winning runners-up medals in both tournaments.

== Career statistics ==
As of match played on 14 December 2017

Club	Season	League			Cup		Other		Total	
Club	Season	Division	Apps	Goals	Apps	Goals	Apps	Goals	Apps	Goals
Real Madrid B	2003–04	Segunda División B	1	0	—		—		1	0
Real Madrid B	2004–05	Segunda División B	3	0	—		—		3	0
Real Madrid B	2005–06	Segunda División	1	0	—		—		1	0
Real Madrid B	2006–07	Segunda División	31	2	—		—		31	2
Real Madrid B	2007–08	Segunda División B	17	1	—		—		17	1
Real Madrid B	2008–09	Segunda División B	34	1	—		—		34	1
Real Madrid B	2009–10	Segunda División B	7	0	—		—		7	0
Real Madrid B	Total		94	4	—		—		94	4
Rayo Vallecano (loan)	2005–06	Segunda División B	17	1	0	0	—		17	1
Real Madrid	2005–06	La Liga	0	0	0	0	0	0	0	0
Real Madrid	2008–09	La Liga	1	0	0	0	0	0	1	0
Real Madrid	Total		1	0	0	0	0	0	1	0
Girona	2009–10	Segunda División	9	0	0	0	—		9	0
Girona	2010–11	Segunda División	35	0	1	0	—		36	0
Girona	2011–12	Segunda División	35	0	1	0	—		36	0
Girona	2012–13	Segunda División	35	4	1	0	4 (Note: Appearances in Promotion Play-offs)	0	40	4
Girona	Total		114	4	3	0	4	0	121	4
Almería	2013–14	La Liga	25	0	4	0	—		29	0
Brentford	2014–15	Championship	4	0	2	0	—		6	0
Brentford	2015–16	Championship	0	0	0	0	—		0	0
Brentford	Total		4	0	2	0	—		6	0
Llagostera	2015–16	Segunda División	20	0	0	0	—		20	0
Delhi Dynamos	2016	Indian Super League	12	0	—		—		12	0
Reus	2016–17	Segunda División	9	0	0	0	—		9	0
FC Pune City	2017–18	Indian Super League	6	1	—		—		6	1
Career total			285	10	9	0	0	0	294	10

== Honours ==
Spain U17

- FIFA U-17 World Cup: Runner-up 2003
- UEFA European Under-17 Championship: Runner-up 2003
