= Marko Stanković =

Austrian footballer

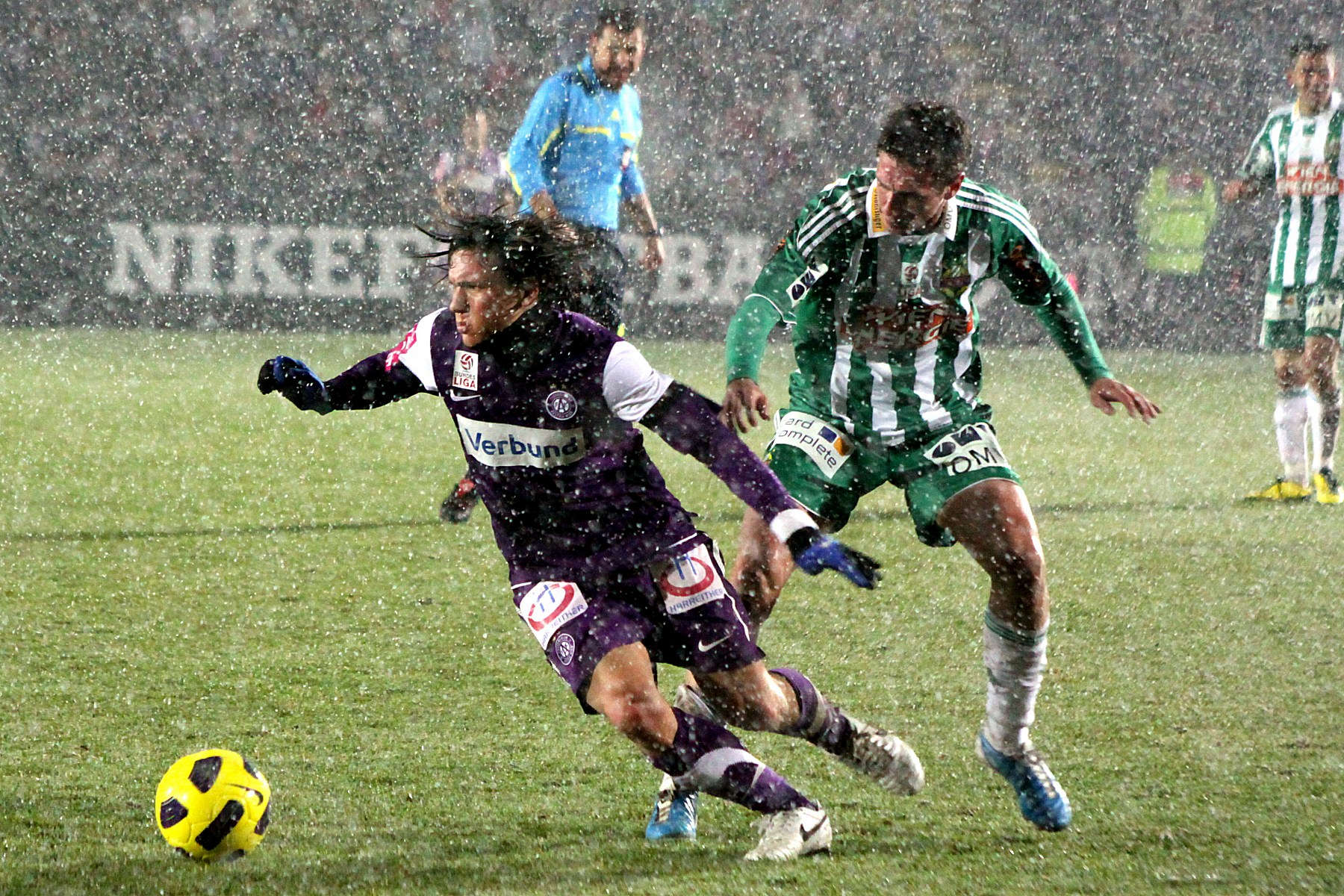
- Stanković (left) with Austria Wien in 2010

Personal information
- Date of birth: 17 February 1986 (age 40)
- Place of birth: Leoben, Austria
- Height: 1.77 m (5 ft 10 in)
- Position: Midfielder

Youth career
- 1991–2007: DSV Leoben
- 2005: → ASK Voitsberg (loan)

Senior career*
Years	Team	Apps	(Gls)
2003–2007	DSV Leoben	95	(12)
2007–2008	Sturm Graz	53	(10)
2009–2010	Triestina	22	(0)
2010–2014	Austria Wien	94	(16)
2014–2017	Sturm Graz	45	(6)
2017–2018	SV Ried	9	(2)
2018–2019	FC Pune City	23	(2)
2019–2020	Hyderabad FC	15	(2)
2020–2022	SV Lebring	15	(3)
Total		371	(53)

International career
2004–2008	Austria U21	20	(6)
2008	Austria	1	(0)
- * Club domestic league appearances and goals

Marko Stanković (German pronunciation: [ˈmarko ˈstaŋkɔvɪtʃ]; born 17 February 1986) is an Austrian former professional footballer who played as a central midfielder. He also represented the Austria national team on one occasion in 2008.

== Club career ==
Born in Krems, Austria, Marko Stankovic started his career at DSV Leoben before moving to the Austrian top division side, Sturm Graz.

He played in the UEFA Champions League for Austria Wien in the 2013–14 season and also recorded an assist against Zenit Saint Petersburg.

=== Indian Super League ===
Stankovic signed for Indian Super League side FC Pune City in January 2018 as a mid-season replacement for Robertino Pugliara and played 10 matches in the 2017-18 campaign. The Austrian notched up two goals and three assists for the Stallions in 13 outings last term.

Later he moved to another Indian side Hyderabad FC.

=== Later career ===
In 2020, Stanković has announced his retirement at the age of 33. but later he came back in action with Landesliga Steiermark outfit SV Lebring in the same year.

== International career ==
Stanković appeared for the Austria U21 national team in 20 times between 2004 and 2008 and notched up 6 goals.

He made his international debut for the Austria senior national team on 20 November 2008 against Turkey.

== Personal life ==
Stanković is the son of the former football professional and current coach Dejan Stanković.

== Honours ==
Austria Wien

- Austrian Football Bundesliga: 2012–13
- Austrian Cup runner-up: 2012–13

Austria U17

- U17 European Championship third place: 2003

Individual

- 2007: Player of the Year in the Red Zac Erste Liga: 2006–07
