= Adil Khan (footballer) =

Indian footballer

Personal information
- Full name: Adil Ahmad Khan
- Date of birth: 7 July 1988 (age 38)
- Place of birth: Verna, Goa, India
- Height: 1.77 m (5 ft 9 1/2 in)
- Positions: Centre-back; defensive midfielder

Team information
- Current team: Kannur Warriors FC
- Number: 6

Youth career
- 2003–2008: SESA

Senior career*
Years	Team	Apps	(Gls)
2008–2013	Sporting Goa	74	(12)
2013–2014	Mohun Bagan	7	(0)
2014	Delhi Dynamos	7	(0)
2014–2015	Bharat		
2016	Lonestar Kashmir	10	(1)
2016	Dempo	18	(5)
2017	Churchill Brothers	18	(2)
2017–2019	Pune City	35	(6)
2019–2022	Hyderabad	19	(0)
2021	→ Goa (loan)	7	(0)
2021–2022	→ East Bengal (loan)	14	(0)
2023	Ambernath United Atlanta	4	(3)
2023	Sporting Goa		
2024–	Kannur Warriors		

International career
2012–	India	13	(1)
- * Club domestic league appearances and goals

Adil Ahmad Khan (born 7 July 1988) is an Indian professional footballer who plays as a defender or defensive midfielder for Kannur Warriors FC and the India national team.

== Club career ==
=== Sporting Goa ===
A product of the Sesa Football Academy, Adil Khan started his football career in SESA in 2003 where he played for 5 years before moving to Sporting Goa in 2008. He would spend 5 years at Sporting, playing for them in various positions, primarily in full back and centre midfield, first in the I-League 2nd Division and later in the I-League for 5 years and scoring 12 goals.

=== Mohun Bagan ===
Khan signed for century-old Kolkata-based club Mohun Bagan on a one-year deal for the 2013–14 season. He made his debut for Bagan in the I-League on 22 October 2013 against Bengaluru at the Bangalore Football Stadium as Bagan drew the match 1–1. He would go on to make only 6 more appearances and was used primarily as a squad player.

=== Delhi Dynamos ===
Adil Khan represented Delhi Dynamos in the 2014 Indian Super League where he played as a right back and appeared in 7 matches but could not help his team qualify for the semi-finals.

=== Bharat ===
He joined the newly formed I-League team Bharat for the 2014–15 season but prior to the season beginning, endured a season-ending injury. Initially, he chose not to have an operation but the result was missing out on the entire season where his team finished last and was later disbanded. He would eventually undergo surgery in the off-season.

=== Lonestar Kashmir ===
After recovering from the injury he sustained while with Bharat, Khan signed with I-League 2 side Lonestar Kashmir on a 3-month deal to play in the 2015–16 season. He would feature for his team in the group stage and later in the final round but could only help his team finish 6th and last in the final round after qualifying form the group.

=== Dempo ===
After finishing the season with Lonestar Kashmir, he signed a short-term deal with Dempo to play in the Goa Professional League, a state level tournament. His team however, did not participate in the top-tier I-League during the season.

=== Churchill Brothers ===
Adil signed for the newly re-instated I-League club Churchill Brothers for the 2016–17 I-League season. He re-invented himself as a centre back and appeared 18 times for Churchill in a fairly successful season as a starting centre back as his team finished 6th.

=== Pune City ===
Khan signed for two years with Pune City, where he primarily played as a centre back across the 2017–18 season and 2018–19 season.

=== Hyderabad ===
Adil signed for Hyderabad in September 2019 for the 2019–20 season. In January 2020, Hyderabad FC extended his contract for three years.

==== Goa (loan) ====
On 22 January 2021, Adil Khan joined Goa on loan for the duration of the 2020–21 season. He made his debut for Goa on 29 January against SC East Bengal.

==== SC East Bengal (loan) ====
In 2021, He joined SC East Bengal on loan for the duration of the 2021–22 season.

== International career ==
Khan made his senior international debut against Azerbaijan for India on 27 February 2012. He Scored the only goal for India in 1–1 draw against Bangladesh in the 2022 World Cup Qualifiers, at Salt Lake Stadium.

== Personal life ==
On 23 April 2019, he married his girlfriend and Star Sports anchor Khuri Irani. She mainly presents Indian Super League.

== Career statistics ==
=== Club ===
As of 5 March 2022

Club	Season	League			Cup		AFC		Total	
Club	Season	Division	Apps	Goals	Apps	Goals	Apps	Goals	Apps	Goals
Sporting Goa	2012–13	I-League	12	0	0	0	—		12	0
Mohun Bagan	2013–14	I-League	7	0	0	0	—		7	0
Delhi Dynamos	2014	Indian Super League	7	0	0	0	—		7	0
Lonestar Kashmir	2015–16	I-League 2nd Division	10	1	0	0	—		10	1
Churchill Brothers	2016–17	I-League	18	2	3 (Note: Appearance(s) in Federation Cup)	0	—		21	2
Pune City	2017–18	Indian Super League	18	4	0	0	—		18	4
Pune City	2018–19	Indian Super League	17	2	2 (Note: Appearance(s) in Super Cup)	0	—		19	2
Pune City	Pune City total		35	6	2	0	0	0	37	6
Hyderabad	2019–20	Indian Super League	14	0	0	0	—		14	0
Hyderabad	2020–21	Indian Super League	5	0	0	0	—		5	0
Hyderabad	Hyderabad total		19	0	0	0	0	0	19	0
Goa (loan)	2020–21	Indian Super League	7	0	0	0	3 (Note: Appearance(s) in AFC Champions League)	0	10	0
East Bengal (loan)	2021–22	Indian Super League	14	0	0	0	—		14	0
Career total			129	14	5	0	3	0	137	14

=== International ===
As of matches played till 7 June 2021

National team	Year	Apps	Goals
India	2012	3	0
India	2019	8	1
India	2021	2	0
Total		13	1

==== International goals ====
Scores and results list India's goal tally first

No.	Date	Venue	Cap	Opponent	Score	Result	Competition	Ref.
1.	15 October 2019	Salt Lake Stadium, Kolkata, India	9	Bangladesh	1–1	1–1	2022 FIFA World Cup qualification	

== Honours ==
India

- King's Cup third place: 2019
