= Nikhil Poojary =

Indian footballer

Personal information
- Full name: Nikhil Chandra Shekhar Poojary
- Date of birth: 3 September 1995 (age 31)
- Place of birth: Mangaluru, Karnataka, India
- Height: 1.77 m (5 ft 10 in)
- Positions: Right-back; winger

Team information
- Current team: Bengaluru
- Number: 27

Youth career
- Ryan FC
- Dodsal
- Mumbai

Senior career*
Years	Team	Apps	(Gls)
2016–2018	East Bengal	14	(0)
2018–2019	Pune City	9	(1)
2019–2024	Hyderabad	79	(1)
2024–	Bengaluru	27	(0)

International career^{‡}
2017–2018	India U23	5	(0)
2017–	India	33	(1)
Medal record
Men's football
Representing India
SAFF Championship
Winner	2023 India
Runner-up	2018 Bangladesh
- * Club domestic league appearances and goals as of 23:43, 7 February 2024 (UTC) ‡ National team caps and goals as of 22:00, 9 June 2026 (UTC)

Nikhil Chandra Shekhar Poojary (born 3 September 1995) is an Indian professional footballer who plays as a right-back or winger for Indian Super League club Bengaluru and the India national team.

== Club career ==
Born in Mangalore, Karnataka Poojary started his career with Ryan FC in Mumbai. While with Ryan FC, Poojary was selected to play for the Maharashtra under-19 side in the school games nationals. Poojary soon joined the youth side of Mumbai before signing with Kolkata giants East Bengal in 2015.

Poojary made his first-team debut for East Bengal on 4 August 2016 in their opening Calcutta Football League fixture against Bhawanipore. He came on as a 78th-minute substitute for Jiten Murmu as East Bengal won 2–1. Poojary scored his first goal for the club on 23 September 2016 during the group stage match of the Bordoloi Trophy against Bongobi Agragami of Bangladesh. His strike in the 87th minute was the last goal in a 6–0 victory.

On September 19, 2024, Poojary made his 100th appearance in Indian Super League, making him 48th overall and 38th Indian player to achieve this mark.

=== Bengaluru FC ===
After leaving Hyderabad he joined another Indian Super League side Bengaluru FC.

== International career ==
He scored his first international goal against Maldives in the 2018 SAFF Championship.

== Career statistics ==
=== Club ===
As of 21 March 2024

Club	Season	League			Cup		AFC		Other		Total	
Club	Season	Division	Apps	Goals	Apps	Goals	Apps	Goals	Apps	Goals	Apps	Goals
East Bengal	2016–17	I-League	14	0	2 (Note: Appearances in Federation Cup)	0	—		6 (Note: 4 Appearances in Calcutta Football League and 2 Appearances in Bordoloi Trophy)	1 (Note: Goal in Calcutta Football League)	22	1
East Bengal	2017–18	I-League	0	0	0	0	—		2 (Note: Appearances in Calcutta Football League)	1	2	1
East Bengal	Total		14	0	2	0	0	0	8	2	24	2
Pune City	2018–19	Indian Super League	9	1	2 (Note: Appearances in Super Cup)	0	—		—		11	1
Hyderabad	2019–20	Indian Super League	18	0	0	0	—		—		18	0
Hyderabad	2020–21	Indian Super League	10	0	0	0	—		—		10	0
Hyderabad	2021–22	Indian Super League	19	1	0	0	—		—		19	1
Hyderabad	2022–23	Indian Super League	21	0	7 (Note: 5 Appearances in Durand Cup and 2 Appearances in Super Cup)	0	—		—		29	0
Hyderabad	2023–24	Indian Super League	11	0	0	0	—		—		11	0
Hyderabad	Total		79	1	7	0	0	0	0	0	86	1
Bengaluru	2023–24	Indian Super League	7	0	0	0	—		—		7	0
Career total			109	2	11	0	0	0	8	2	128	3

=== International ===
As of 9 June 2026

National team	Year	Apps	Goals
India	2017	2	0
India	2018	5	1
India	2019	1	0
India	2023	13	0
India	2024	8	0
India	2025	0	0
India	2026	4	0
Total		33	1

==== International goals ====
Scores and results list India's goal tally first

No.	Date	Venue	Cap	Opponent	Score	Result	Competition	Ref.
1	9 September 2018	Bangabandhu National Stadium, Dhaka, Bangladesh	4	Maldives	1–0	2–0	2018 SAFF Championship	

== Honours ==
India

- SAFF Championship: 2023
- Tri-Nation Series: 2017
- Intercontinental Cup: 2023

Hyderabad

- Indian Super League: 2021–22
