= SC Delhi =

Association football club in India

Sporting Club Delhi
- Full name: Sporting Club Delhi
- Nickname: The Phoenix
- Short name: SCD
- Founded: 27 August 2019; 7 years ago (as Hyderabad FC); 6 October 2025; 13 months ago (as SC Delhi)
- Stadium: Jawaharlal Nehru Stadium
- Capacity: 60,254
- Owners: Jindal Football Pvt. Ltd.
- Head coach: Tomasz Tchórz
- League: Indian Super League
- 2025–26: Indian Super League, 12th of 14
- Website: scdelhi.in
Home colours	Away colours	Third colours

Sporting Club Delhi is an Indian professional football club based in New Delhi. The club competes in the Indian Super League (ISL), the top flight of Indian football. It was formerly based in Hyderabad, Telangana as Hyderabad FC and played their home matches at the G. M. C. Balayogi Athletic Stadium, Gachibowli. It was founded on 27 August 2019, and began their first professional season from 2019–20. Ahead the 2025–26 ISL the club rebranded as Sporting Club Delhi, and relocated to its base in New Delhi. The club is owned and operated by Delhi-based B. C. Jindal Group.

On 16 June 2020, German club Borussia Dortmund entered a grassroots development partnership with Hyderabad. They played their inaugural match on 25 October 2019, suffering a 0–5 defeat to ATK. The club completed their first season in the ISL in the 10th place, failing to qualify for the playoffs. The club won their first and only ISL title in the 2021–22 ISL season, defeating Kerala Blasters 3–1 on penalties in the final.

== History ==
=== Formation ===
In February 2019, it was reported that Indian Super League side FC Pune City were struggling financially and that their owners were looking to sell the club. The club reportedly were behind on paying players and had also attempted to discuss merging with local rivals Mumbai City. After the 2018–19 season, Pune City released all their players and participated in the Super Cup using academy players.

On 26 August 2019, it was reported that Pune City had disbanded and that the former Kerala Blasters CEO Varun Tripuraneni had bought a majority stake in the club. Neither then Pune City CEO Gaurav Modwel or Tripuraneni confirmed the reports. However, the next day, on 27 August 2019, it was announced that Hyderabad FC would replace Pune City for the 2019–20 season, with Tripuraneni and businessman Vijay Madduri buying the ownership rights to the team. The club's branding and first kits were then revealed prior to their first season on 29 September 2019.

On 2 September 2024, Jindal Football Pvt. Ltd., under the ambit of the BC Jindal Group, announced the acquisition of the sporting license of the club. In October 2025, the club announced shifting its base from Hyderabad to New Delhi. The club is also rebranded as Sporting Club Delhi. The rebranded club played its first match in the 2025–26 AIFF Super Cup.

=== As Hyderabad ===
==== Inaugural season ====
On 29 August 2019, it was announced that Phil Brown, the last head coach of Pune City, would be the first head coach for Hyderabad. In late September, just before the start of the 2019–20 season, it was revealed that Hyderabad had signed almost every player from Pune City's final squad.

The club played their first ever match on 25 October 2019 against ATK at the Salt Lake Stadium. They were defeated 0–5 in a match which Brown described as "not our usual standards". Hyderabad then succumbed to defeat again in their second match against Jamshedpur. Marcelinho scored the first goal for the club's history but could not prevent his side's 1–3 defeat. The club finally earned their first victory in their third match on 2 November 2019 against the Kerala Blasters. This was also Hyderabad's first home match. Goals from Marko Stanković and Marcelinho helped Hyderabad to a 2–1 victory.

On 11 January 2020, with the club in last place in the table, with just one victory and two draws from 12 matches, Brown and the club decided to part ways. Former India international Mehrajuddin Wadoo took over as caretaker for one match before assistant coach Xavier Gurri López became interim coach for the rest of the season. The club finished their season with a 5–1 victory over NorthEast United on 20 February 2020. Overall, the club finished the season in last place and failed to qualify for the ISL playoffs.

==== 2020–21 season ====
Ahead of the 2020–21 Indian Super League season, Hyderabad appointed Manolo Márquez as their head coach after Albert Roca mutually parted ways with the club when he was approached by FC Barcelona to become their fitness coach.

Hyderabad FC began their second competitive season on 23 November with a win against Odisha FC. After struggling early in the season, the team made a decent comeback, as they had an unbeaten run which lasted for 12 matches. They managed to get 29 points from 20 games, which includes six wins, three losses and eleven draws. Their last game against FC Goa became crucial for them as they needed a win to qualify into the playoffs. After having a goalless draw against Goa, Hyderabad narrowly missed the play-offs as they finished 5th in the league table.

==== 2021–22 season ====
In their third season of the Indian Super League, Hyderabad FC won their maiden cup title on March 20, 2022, in Margao, Goa. They beat Kerala Blasters 3-1 on penalties after the match finished 1-1 after extra time.

Hyderabad FC goalkeeper Laxmikant Kattimani saved four penalties in the shootout, including one that was retaken after being saved initially.

==== 2022–23 season ====
In their fourth season of the Indian Super League, Hyderabad FC finished 2nd in the table to directly qualify for the Semi-Final and avoiding Knockout match. They went on to lose to ATK Mohun Bagan in a 2 legged semifinal.

==== 2023–24 season ====
Ahead of the 2023–24 Indian Super League season, Hyderabad appointed Conor Nestor as their first team coach who will become their head coach once he acquires his UEFA Pro License, after Manolo Márquez mutually parted ways with the club. Until then, Thangboi Singto will act as the head coach and Shameel Chembakath will act as his assistant.

The club also confirmed the departures of Odei Onaindia, Borja Herrera, Akash Mishra, Joel Chianese, Halicharan Narzary and Javier Siverio. Afterwards, Jonathan Moya, Joe Knowles, Petteri Pennanen and Felipe Amorim became the high-profile incomings.

On 3 May 2023, Mohun Bagan SG were confirmed 2023–24 AFC Cup preliminary round slot after a 3–1 win via penalties over Hyderabad FC. In their 3rd appearance in the Durand Cup group stages, they finished second in group E, behind Chennaiyin FC, and above Delhi FC and Tribhuvan Army. They beat Tribhuvan Army 3–0, lost to Chennaiyin 1-3 and drew with Delhi FC 1-1 in their campaign. They finished 5th out of the six 2nd placed teams and hence, couldn't qualify for the knockout stage.

=== As Sporting Delhi ===
==== 2025–26 season ====
When Delhi-based BC Jindal Group acquired the team ahead of the previous season, they wanted to move the club North to reduce logistical challenges. Hence, after the Durand Cup, and prior to the Super Cup on 6 October 2025, the club announced it would be relocating to New Delhi. Their new name Sporting Club Delhi was revealed on the same day.

On 15 February 2026, Sporting Club Delhi played its first Indian Super League match against Bengaluru FC, which they lost 2-0.

== Crest ==
=== Previous ===
Former club crest (2019–2025)

The team colours and logo for Hyderabad were unveiled on 21 September 2019. The club colours were yellow and black. According to the club, the logo was titled "Reliving Hyderabad's Football Legacy" and was meant to represent Hyderabad and the city's heritage. The logo featured the minarets from the Charminar in the city and Koh-i-Noor diamonds. According to Hyderabad co-owner Vijay Madduri, the logo was "inspired from the city's history". Madduri hoped that HFC would be "a great boost for the sport in the region" and could give "a boost to the legacy that is already present in the city's history and roots."

=== Rebranded ===
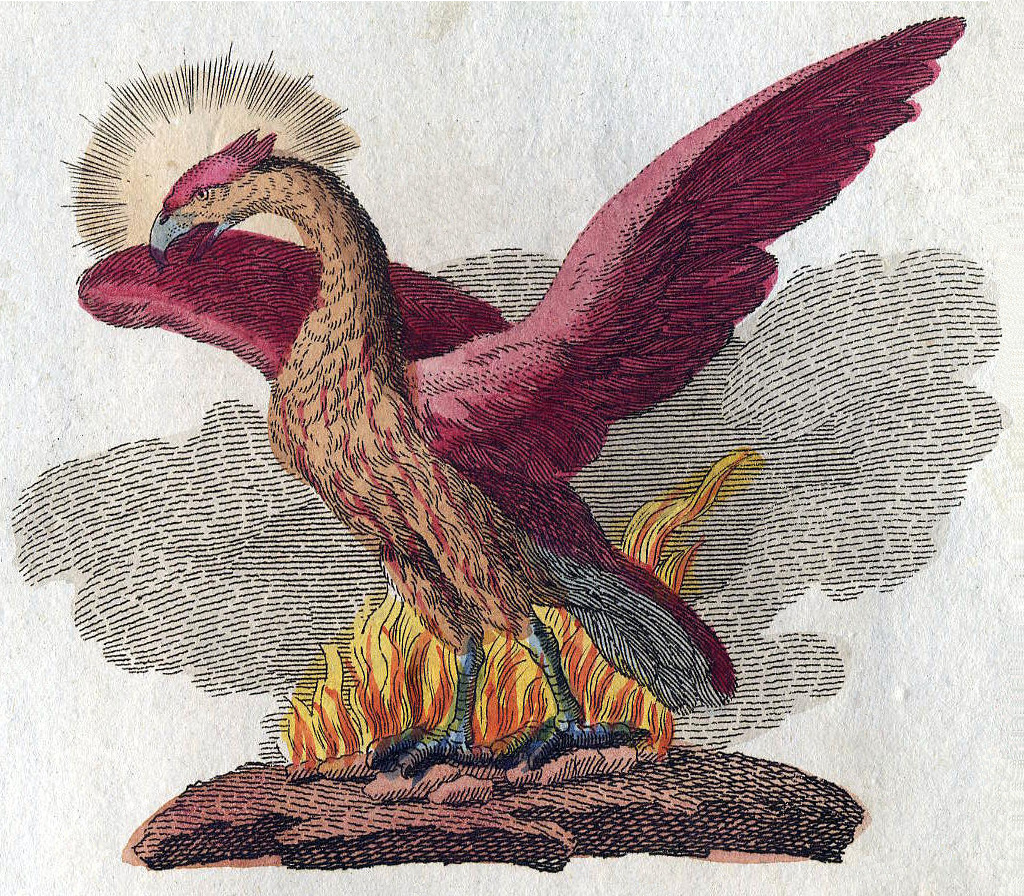
An 18th century artist's depiction of phoenix rising from fire.

As Hyderabad FC rebranded to Sporting Club Delhi, the club launched its crest on 18 October 2025. The new logo consists of a stylized Phoenix, a mythical bird that rises from the flames. Dhruv Sood, the club's CEO, said that the new identity will highlight "Delhi rising from the ashes in the absence of professional football in the city and the region." He also added, "With this move, the capital city, which once had a thriving football culture and stood at the heart of Indian football, will return to the top-tier of Indian football leagues with its own club."

== Kit manufacturers and shirt sponsors ==
Period	Kit manufacturer	Shirt sponsor	Back sponsor
2019–20	Reyaur		Jai Raj Steel
2020–21	T10 Sports	Andslite	Polyhose
2021–22	Hummel	DafaNews	Polyhose
2022–23	Hummel	Stake News	Spartek
2023–24	Hummel	Stake News	
2024–25	Hummel		Jindal
2025–26	SIX5SIX	Universal Sompo	
2026–27	SIX5SIX		

== Stadium ==
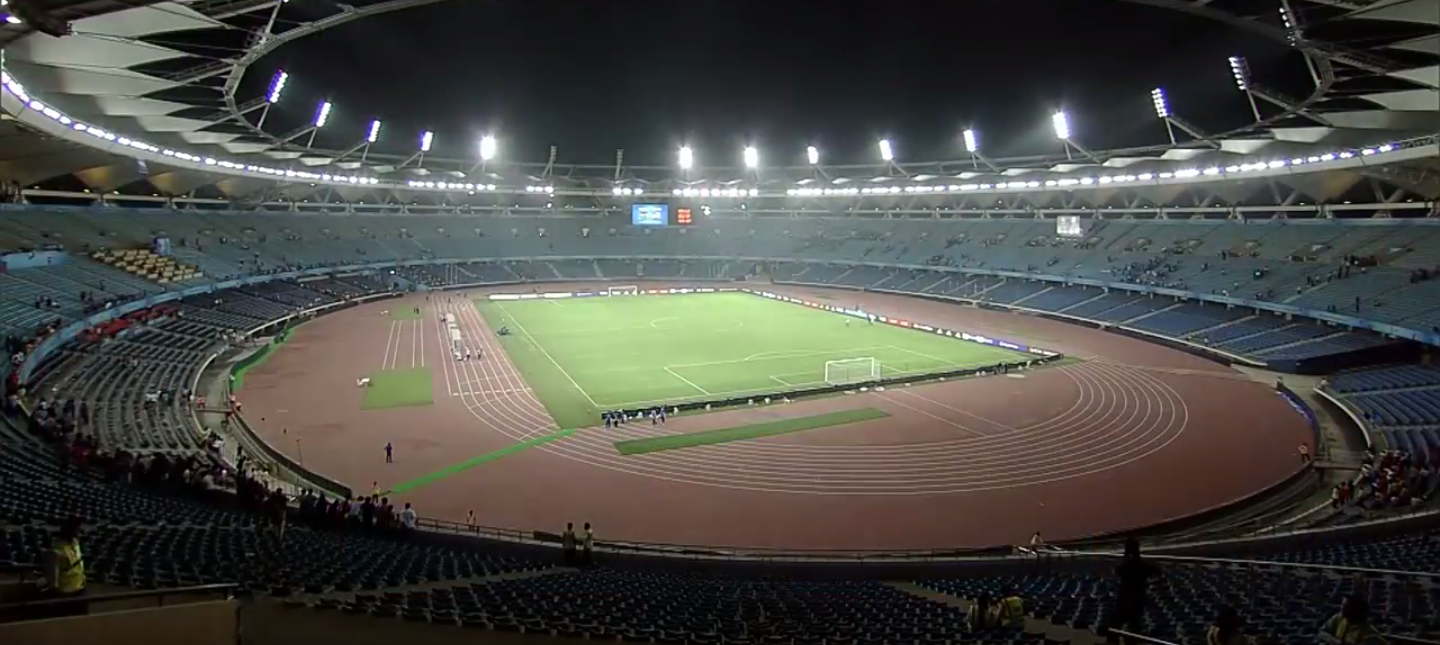
Jawaharlal Nehru Stadium, New Delhi in 2017

The club played their home matches as Hyderabad FC at the G. M. C. Balayogi Athletic Stadium, located in the Hyderabad suburb of Gachibowli. As the club rebranded as Sporting Club Delhi, it changed its base to New Delhi. It has explored the option of sharing Jawaharlal Nehru Stadium with Punjab FC for the 2026–27 season, along with making Ambedkar Stadium as their home ground in the long run.

== Supporters ==
In a very short period, as Hyderabad FC managed to get local support. In their first home match against Kerala Blasters, more than 14,000 people came to support the club, which they won by 2-1. Deccan Legion was active fan group of Hyderabad FC. However, as time passed by the local support reduced, even after the club was crowned as the Indian Super League cup winners in 2021–22 season. The average attendance fell to 7,195 in the 2023–24 season.

== Ownership ==
The founding owners of Hyderabad FC were Vijay Madduri and Varun Tripuraneni. Madduri, then the chief executive officer of the Hyderabad-based company Incessant Technologies, said that he was looking forward to his "significant role in developing football in the state, reviving its past glory". Tripuraneni is the former CEO of the Kerala Blasters, another Indian Super League side. In August 2019, it was announced that Hyderabad would replace a financially struggled Pune City for the 2019–20 season, with Tripuraneni and Madduri buying the ownership rights of the disbanded club. During the club's announcement, Tripuraneni said "It is a proud moment for me, to be co-owner of Hyderabad FC. Hyderabad is a city with great football culture. I look forward to working with key stakeholders and building a strong foundation for the club, which will eventually contribute to society and do the city proud. Our immediate task is to prepare for the new season".

In October 2019, the club announced prominent Telugu actor Rana Daggubati as a new stakeholder, becaming co-owner along with Madduri and Tripuraneni. On 2 September 2024, Jindal Football Pvt. Ltd. under the ambit of the Delhi-based B.C. Jindal Group, announced the acquisition of the sporting license. This marks the BC Jindal Group's first venture into the Indian sports ecosystem. In October 2025, the club announced shifting its base and rebranding as Sporting Club Delhi.

== Players ==
=== First-team squad ===
As of August 2026

Note: Flags indicate national team as defined under FIFA eligibility rules; some limited exceptions apply. Players may hold more than one non-FIFA nationality.

No.	Pos.	Nation	Player
4	MF	IND	Lalrinliana Hnamte
5	DF	IND	Mohammed Kaif
6	DF	IND	Ashutosh Mehta
7	FW	BRA	Rodriguinho
8	MF	BDI	David Richard Ndayishimiye
9	FW	IND	Alan Saji
10	MF	COL	Juan Peña
11	FW	IND	Joseph Sunny
13	DF	IND	Lamgoulen Hangshing (captain)
15	DF	IND	Clarence Fernandes
16	MF	IND	Kharon Subba
19	FW	IND	Augustine Lalrochana
20	GK	IND	Nora Fernandes

No.	Pos.	Nation	Player
21	GK	IND	Tajamul Islam
23	FW	IND	Mohammed Aimen
24	MF	IND	Mohammed Azhar
25	DF	IND	Yanglem Sanatomba Singh
27	FW	IND	Sourav K
28	DF	COL	Duván Viáfara
30	MF	IND	Thokchom Diamond Singh
31	GK	IND	Vishal Yadav
41	DF	IND	Manoj Mohammed
66	DF	IND	Akshat Mehra
80	FW	IND	KS Shikhar
99	FW	CPV	Carlos Fortes

=== Out on loan ===
Note: Flags indicate national team as defined under FIFA eligibility rules; some limited exceptions apply. Players may hold more than one non-FIFA nationality.

No.	Pos.	Nation	Player

== Personnel ==
=== Technical staff ===
As of August 2026

Position	Name
Head coach	(Poland) Tomasz Tchórz
Assistant coach	(India) Suraj Pillai
Goalkeeping coach	(India) Luis Mario Aguiar
Head of analysis	(India) Shrivatsa Joglekar
Strength & conditioning coach	(India) Pushpendra Singh Kushwaha
Kit manager	(India) Prashant Naidu

== Records and statistics ==
=== Head coaches ===
As of October 2025

Including Hyderabad FC:

Name	Nationality	From	To	P	W	D	L	GF	GA	Win%
Phil Brown	England	29 August 2019	11 January 2020	12	1	2	9	12	29	8.33
Mehrajuddin Wadoo (caretaker)	India	11 January 2020	24 January 2020	1	0	1	0	1	2	0.00
Xavier Gurri López (interim)	Spain	24 January 2020	1 June 2020	5	1	2	2	8	8	20.00
Albert Roca	Spain	1 June 2020	29 August 2020	0	0	0	0	0	0	—
Manolo Márquez	Spain	31 August 2020	31 May 2023	57	27	18	12	95	53	47.37
Thangboi Singto	India	7 July 2023	18 December 2024	30	2	6	22	19	59	6.67
Shameel Chembakath	India	18 December 2024	31 May 2025	13	2	5	6	15	27	15.38
Tomasz Tchórz	Poland	18 October 2025	present	3	0	1	2	3	9	0.00

=== Team records ===
As of 31 December 2022

==== Most appearances ====
As Hyderabad FC:

Rank	Player	Appearances
1	(India) Mohammad Yasir	74
2	(India) Nikhil Poojary	64
3	(India) Akash Mishra	57
4	(India) Chinglensana Singh	54
4	(Brazil) João Victor	54
6	(India) Laxmikant Kattimani	51
7	(India) Asish Rai	48
8	(India) Sahil Tavora	45
8	(Australia) Joel Chianese	45
10	(India) Halicharan Narzary	43

==== Most goals ====
As Hyderabad FC:

Rank	Player	Goals
1	(Nigeria) Bartholomew Ogbeche	28
2	(Spain) Javier Siverio	12
2	(Brazil) João Victor	12

== Honours ==
- Indian Super League
  - Champions (1): 2021–22 (as Hyderabad FC)

== Affiliated clubs ==
As Hyderabad FC:

- (Germany) Borussia Dortmund (2020–2025)
- (Spain) Marbella FC (2020–2025)

== See also ==
- SC Delhi Reserves and Academy
- Delhi Football League
