= 2022–23 Hyderabad FC season =

2022–23 season of Hyderabad FC

Hyderabad
2022–23 season
- Head coach: Manolo Márquez
- Stadium: G. M. C. Balayogi Athletic Stadium
- ISL: League: 2nd Playoffs: Semi finals
- Durand Cup: Semi-finals
- AIFF Super Cup: Group Stage
- Top goalscorer: League: Bartholomew Ogbeche (8); All: Bartholomew Ogbeche (13)
Home colours	Away colours
- All statistics correct as of 15 February 2023.

The 2022–23 Hyderabad FC season is the club's fourth competitive season since its inception in 2019 and fourth consecutive season in the Indian Super League. The season covers from 1 June 2022 to 31 May 2023.

== Kits ==
Home	Away

== Management team ==
As of 5 August 2022

Role	Name
Head coach	(Spain) Manolo Márquez
Assistant coach	(Argentina) Benito Montalvo
Assistant coach	(India) Shameel Chembakath
Goalkeeping coach	(Spain) Asier Rey
Head of Performance Analysis	(India) Joy Gabriel M
Fitness coach	(Spain) Jose Carlos Barroso

== Players ==
Players and squad numbers last updated on 15 February 2023. Appearances include all competitions.
Note: Flags indicate national team as has been defined under FIFA eligibility rules. Players may hold more than one non-FIFA nationality.

No.	Pos.	Player	Nationality	Date of birth (age)	Signed in	Contract ends	Signed from	Apps	Goals
Goalkeepers
1	GK	Gurmeet Singh	(India)	3 December 1999 (aged 22)	2021	2024	(India) NorthEast United	13	0
13	GK	Lalbiakhlua Jongte	(India)	23 July 2002 (aged 19)	2020	2023	(India) Indian Arrows	3	0
23	GK	Anuj Kumar	(India)	24 July 1998 (aged 23)	2019	2023	(India) Pune City	3	0
25	GK	Laxmikant Kattimani	(India)	3 May 1989 (aged 33)	2019	2024	(India) Goa	51	0
40	GK	Aman Kumar Sahani	(India)	8 May 2004 (aged 18)	2022	2024	(India) Hyderabad Reserves	0	0
	GK	Manas Dubey	(India)	8 October 2001 (aged 20)	2020	2023	(India) Hyderabad Reserves	0	0
Defenders
2	DF	Reagan Singh	(India)	1 April 1991 (aged 31)	2022	2023	(India) Chennaiyin	8	0
4	DF	Chinglensana Singh	(India)	27 November 1996 (aged 25)	2020	2025	(India) Goa	56	2
16	DF	Odei Onaindia	(Spain)	7 December 1989 (aged 32)	2022	2023	(Spain) CD Mirandés	44	1
26	DF	Borja Herrera	(Spain)	8 January 1993 (aged 29)	2022	2023	(Spain) UD Tamaraceite	25	5
29	DF	Nim Dorjee Tamang	(India)	30 October 1995 (aged 26)	2021	2024	(India) NorthEast United	24	1
31	DF	Akash Mishra	(India)	27 November 2001 (aged 20)	2020	2025	(India) Indian Arrows	64	3
41	DF	Manoj Mohammed	(India)	8 January 1999 (aged 23)	2022	2025	(India) Mohammedan	6	0
43	DF	Soyal Joshy	(India)	23 April 2002 (aged 20)	2022	2025	(India) Golden Threads	1	0
	DF	Adil Khan	(India)	7 July 1988 (aged 33)	2019	2023	(India) Pune City	19	0
Midfielders
8	MF	João Victor ^{(C)}	(Brazil)	7 November 1988 (aged 33)	2020	2024	(Greece) OFI Crete	56	12
10	MF	Mohammad Yasir	(India)	14 April 1998 (aged 24)	2019	2025	(India) Pune City	72	5
14	MF	Sahil Tavora	(India)	19 October 1995 (aged 26)	2019	2024	(India) Mumbai City	53	1
17	MF	Lalchungnunga Chhangte	(India)	24 January 2001 (aged 21)	2022	2025	(India) Hyderabad Reserves	8	0
18	MF	Hitesh Sharma	(India)	25 December 1997 (aged 24)	2020	2024	(India) ATK	46	1
19	MF	Halicharan Narzary	(India)	10 May 1994 (aged 28)	2020	2023	(India) Kerala Blasters	48	9
27	MF	Nikhil Poojari	(India)	3 September 1995 (aged 26)	2019	2023	(India) Pune City	71	1
77	MF	Abdul Rabeeh	(India)	23 January 2001 (aged 21)	2021	2026	(India) Luca	21	0
88	MF	Mark Zothanpuia	(India)	22 April 2002 (aged 20)	2020	2024	(India) Hyderabad Reserves	7	0
Forwards
7	FW	Joel Chianese	(Australia)	15 February 1990 (aged 32)	2020	2023	(Australia) Perth Glory	53	10
12	FW	Aaren D'Silva	(India)	12 December 1997 (aged 24)	2021	2024	(India) Goa	25	1
20	FW	Bartholomew Ogbeche	(Nigeria)	1 October 1984 (aged 37)	2021	2023	(India) Mumbai City	45	33
24	FW	Rohit Danu	(India)	10 July 2002 (aged 19)	2020	2023	(India) Indian Arrows	33	2
99	FW	Javier Siverio	(Spain)	14 November 1997 (aged 24)	2021	2023	(Spain) Las Palmas B	49	13
	FW	Ishan Dey	(India)	1 July 2000 (aged 21)	2020	2022	(India) Hyderabad Reserves	0	0
	FW	Lalawmpuia	(India)	24 October 1999 (aged 22)	2020	2023	(India) Goa	2	0

== New contracts ==
No.	Position	Player	Date	Until	Source
31	DF	(India) Akash Mishra	21 June 2022	31 May 2025	
14	MF	(India) Sahil Tavora	28 June 2022	31 May 2024	
25	GK	(India) Laxmikant Kattimani	1 July 2022	31 May 2024	
19	MF	(India) Halicharan Narzary	5 July 2022	31 May 2023	
7	FW	(Australia) Joel Chianese	11 July 2022	31 May 2023	
20	FW	(Nigeria) Bartholomew Ogbeche	5 August 2022	31 May 2023	
99	FW	(Spain) Javier Siverio	7 August 2022	31 May 2023	
8	MF	(Brazil) João Victor	20 December 2022	31 May 2024	
10	MF	(India) Mohammad Yasir	21 December 2022	31 May 2025	
18	MF	(India) Hitesh Sharma	21 December 2022	31 May 2024	
77	MF	(India) Abdul Rabeeh	24 January 2023	31 May 2026	

== Transfers ==
=== In ===
Date	No.	Pos.	Player	From	Fee	Source
Summer
15 July 2022	44	DF	(India) Alex Saji	(India) Gokulam Kerala	Free transfer	
20 July 2022	41	DF	(India) Manoj Mohammed	(India) Mohammedan	Free transfer	
21 July 2022	16	DF	(Spain) Odei Onaindia	(Spain) CD Mirandés	Free transfer	
23 July 2022	43	DF	(India) Soyal Joshy	(India) Golden Threads	Free transfer	
27 July 2022		FW	(India) Ramhlunchhunga	(India) Aizawl	Free transfer	
29 July 2022	26	DF	(Spain) Borja Herrera	(Spain) UD Tamaraceite	Free transfer	
Winter
31 December 2022		DF	(India) Sajad Hussain Parray	(India) Indian Arrows	Free transfer	

=== Out ===
Date	No.	Pos.	Player	To	Fee	Source
Summer
1 June 2022	5	DF	(Spain) Juanan	Unattached	Free transfer	
1 June 2022	6	DF	(Mauritania) Khassa Camara	(Greece) Chania	Free transfer	
1 June 2022	22	DF	(India) Nikhil Prabhu	(India) Odisha	Undisclosed	
1 June 2022		DF	(India) Dimple Bhagat	Unattached	Free transfer	
1 June 2022		GK	(India) Subrata Pal	Unattached	Free transfer	
20 June 2022	44	DF	(India) Asish Rai	(India) ATK Mohun Bagan	Undisclosed	
2 August 2022	23	MF	(India) Souvik Chakrabarti	(India) East Bengal	Undisclosed	
3 August 2022	9	FW	(India) Aniket Jadhav	(India) East Bengal	Undisclosed	
3 August 2022	33	DF	(India) Pritam Kumar Singh	(India) East Bengal	Free transfer	

=== Loan in ===
No.	Pos.	Player	From	Date	Until	Fee	Source
Summer
	DF	(India) Reagan Singh	(India) Chennaiyin	31 August 2022	31 May 2023	Undisclosed	

=== Loan out ===
No.	Pos.	Player	To	Date	Until	Fee	Source
Summer
32	DF	(India) Amritpal Singh	(India) Rajasthan United	5 August 2022	31 May 2023	Undisclosed	
	FW	(India) Ramhlunchhunga	(India) Sreenidi Deccan	16 August 2022	31 May 2023	Undisclosed	
Winter
	DF	(India) Sajad Hussain Parray	(India) Gokulam Kerala	31 December 2022	31 May 2023	Undisclosed	
11	MF	(India) Sweden Fernandes	(India) NEROCA	3 January 2023	31 May 2023	Undisclosed	
44	DF	(India) Alex Saji	(India) NorthEast United	4 January 2023	31 May 2023	Undisclosed	

== Pre-season ==
13 August 2022 Friendly	Hyderabad	2–1	SC Bengaluru	Hyderabad
17:00 IST	Siverio 70', 82'	Report

17 August 2022 Friendly	Hyderabad	8–0	Hyderabad XI	Hyderabad
17:00 IST	Borja Herrera; D'Silva; Chhangte; Narzary; Ogbeche; Victor (pen.); Yasir; Siverio	Report

23 September 2022 Friendly	Hyderabad	3–1	Goa	Salvador do Mundo
18:00 IST	D'Silva; Chianese; Siverio (red card); Poojari	Report	Guarrotxena

26 September 2022 Friendly	Hyderabad	4–1	Sesa	Salvador do Mundo
18:00 IST	Siverio; D'Silva; Chianese 2'	Report

2 October 2022 Friendly	Sreenidhi Deccan	2–2	Hyderabad	Aziznagar
09:00 IST		Report	Singh	Stadium: Deccan Arena

11 November 2022 Friendly	Hyderabad	2–1	Sreenidhi Deccan	Hyderabad
09:00 IST	Chianese 2'	Report	Khongreiwoshi

17 December 2022 Friendly	Hyderabad	4–1	Sreenidhi Deccan	Hyderabad
09:00 IST	Danu; D'Silva; Mohammed; Chhangte	Report	Velmurugan

== Competitions ==
=== Durand Cup ===
Hyderabad FC participated in the 131st edition of the Durand Cup. Hyderabad were drawn in Group C alongside Army Red, Chennaiyin, NEROCA and TRAU. The fixtures for the Group C were released on 21 July 2022.

==== Group stage ====
Pos	Team	Pld	W	D	L	GF	GA	GD	Pts	Qualification	HYD	CHE	ARR	NER	TRA
1	Hyderabad	4	3	0	1	8	2	+6	9	Qualify for the Knockout stage	—	3–1	—	—	—
2	Chennaiyin	4	2	1	1	9	6	+3	7	Qualify for the Knockout stage	—	—	2–2	—	—
3	Army Red	4	1	2	1	4	4	0	5		1–0	—	—	0–0	—
4	NEROCA (H)	4	1	1	2	3	6	−3	4		0–3	0–2	—	—	3–1
5	TRAU (H)	4	1	0	3	4	10	−6	3		0–2	1–4	2–1	—	—

Source: Sportstar
Rules for classification: 1) points; 2) head-to-head points; 3) head-to-head goal difference; 4) goal difference; 5) number of goals scored; 6) drawing of lots
(H) Hosts

22 August 2022 1	TRAU	0–2	Hyderabad	Imphal
15:00 IST	Singh (yellow card) 60'; Singh (yellow card) 67'	Report	D'Silva (yellow card) 9'; Jongte (yellow card) 11'; Narzary 27'; Herrera 53'; Singh (yellow card) 55'	Stadium: Khuman Lampak Main Stadium; Man of the Match: Sharma (Hyderabad)

26 August 2022 2	Hyderabad	3–1	Chennaiyin	Imphal
15:00 IST	Yasir (yellow card) 39'; Victor 56' (pen.); Ogbeche 64', 74'	Report	Bag (yellow card) 35'; Thapa 42'; Diagne (red card) 54'	Stadium: Khuman Lampak Main Stadium; Man of the Match: Victor (Hyderabad)

30 August 2022 3	NEROCA	0–3	Hyderabad	Imphal
18:00 IST		Report	Chianese 3'; Ogbeche 17', 82'	Stadium: Khuman Lampak Main Stadium; Man of the Match: Sharma (Hyderabad)

3 September 2022 4	Army Red	1–0	Hyderabad	Imphal
15:00 IST	Meitei 33'; Sunil (yellow card) 37'	Report	Mohammed (yellow card) 32'; Victor (yellow card) 90+10'	Stadium: Khuman Lampak Main Stadium; Man of the Match: Thakuri (Army Red)

==== Knockout stage ====
12 September 2022 Quarter-final	Hyderabad	3–1	Rajasthan United	Kolkata
18:00 IST	Ogbeche 6'; Mishra 45+1'; Siverio 68'; Onaindia (yellow card) 80'	Report	Cháves 29' (pen.); Mambetaliev (yellow card) 49'	Stadium: Kishore Bharati Krirangan; Man of the Match: Mishra (Hyderabad)

15 September 2022 Semi-final	Bengaluru	1–0	Hyderabad	Kolkata
18:00 IST	Shrivas (yellow card) 17'; Onaindia 31' (o.g.); Kumar (yellow card) 38'; Singh (yellow card) 48'	Report	Victor (yellow card) 90'	Stadium: Vivekananda Yuba Bharati Krirangan; Man of the Match: Shrivas (Bengaluru)

=== Indian Super League ===
The fixtures for the league stage were announced on 1 September 2022.

==== League table ====
Pos	Team	Pld	W	D	L	GF	GA	GD	Pts	Qualification
1	Mumbai City (C)	20	14	4	2	54	21	+33	46	ISL Cup Semi-finals, Playoffs for 2023–24 ACL group stage and 2023–24 ACL group stage (Note: Qualified via winning the Indian club qualifiers for 2023–24 AFC competitions) (Note: It was announced by AIFF that 2022-23 will be the last season in which the defending Cup Winners will wear the Champions badge. Starting from 2023-24 season it will be the defending League Shield Winners that will wear the Champions badge hereafter.)
2	Hyderabad	20	13	3	4	36	16	+20	42	ISL Cup Semi-finals
3	ATK Mohun Bagan (W)	20	10	4	6	24	17	+7	34 (Note: Head-to-head points: ATK Mohun Bagan 3, Bengaluru 3. Head-to-head goal difference: ATK Mohun Bagan 0, Bengaluru 0. Head-to-head goal scored: ATK Mohun Bagan 4, Bengaluru 4. Goal difference: ATK Mohun Bagan +7, Bengaluru +4.)	ISL Cup Knockouts, Playoffs for 2023–24 AFC Cup qualifiers (Note: Qualified via winning the 2023 Indian Super League playoffs) and 2023–24 AFC Cup qualifiers (Note: Qualified via winning the Indian club qualifiers for 2023–24 AFC competitions) (Note: It was announced by AIFF that 2022-23 will be the last season in which the reigning Cup Winners will wear the Champions badge. Starting from 2023-24 season it will be the reigning League Shield Winners that will wear the Champions badge thereafter.)
4	Bengaluru	20	11	1	8	27	23	+4	34	ISL Cup Knockouts
5	Kerala Blasters	20	10	1	9	28	28	0	31	ISL Cup Knockouts

Source: Indian Super League
Rules for classification: 1) points; 2) head-to-head points; 3) head-to-head goal difference; 4) head-to-head goals scored; 5) goal difference; 6) number of goals scored; 7) fair play ranking; 8) drawing of lots
(C) Champions; (W) ISL Cup winners

==== Results by matchday ====
Matchday	1	2	3	4	5	6	7	8	9	10	11	12	13	14	15	16	17	18	19	20
Ground	H	A	H	H	H	A	H	A	A	H	A	H	A	H	A	A	A	H	H	A
Result	D	W	W	W	W	W	L	L	W	W	W	W	W	D	W	D	L	W	L	W
Position	5	1	1	1	1	1	1	2	2	2	2	2	2	2	2	2	2	2	2	2

Updated to match(es) played on 1 March 2023. Source: soccerway
A = Away; H = Home; W = Win; D = Draw; L = Loss

==== Matches ====
9 October 2022 1	Hyderabad	3–3	Mumbai City	Pune
19:30 IST	Victor 45+2' (pen.), 77'; Narzary 51'; Onaindia (yellow card) 68'	Report	Singh 23' (o.g.); Fall (yellow card) 28'; Díaz (yellow card) 45+1'; Stewart 68' (yellow card) 87'; Noguera 85'	Stadium: Shree Shiv Chhatrapati Sports Complex; Attendance: 2,127; Referee: Tejas Nagvenkar; Man of the Match: Victor (Hyderabad)

13 October 2022 2	NorthEast United	0–3	Hyderabad	Guwahati
19:30 IST	Irshad (yellow card) 12'; Gaztañaga (yellow card) 37'	Report	Ogbeche 13'; Singh (yellow card) 59'; Narzary 69'; Herrera 73'; Sharma (yellow card) 75'	Stadium: Indira Gandhi Athletic Stadium; Attendance: 8,627; Referee: Pratik Mondal; Man of the Match: Narzary (Hyderabad)

22 October 2022 3	Hyderabad	1–0	Bengaluru	Hyderabad
19:30 IST	Ogbeche 83'; Mishra (yellow card) 86'	Report	Hernández (yellow card) 84'	Stadium: G. M. C. Balayogi Athletic Stadium; Attendance: 10,543; Referee: Umesh Bora; Man of the Match: Ogbeche (Hyderabad)

29 October 2022 4	Hyderabad	1–0	Goa	Hyderabad
17:30 IST	Siverio 10'; Tavora (yellow card) 82'	Report	Tlang (yellow card) 36'	Stadium: G. M. C. Balayogi Athletic Stadium; Attendance: 9,638; Referee: Crystal John; Man of the Match: Siverio (Hyderabad)

5 November 2022 5	Hyderabad	1–0	Odisha	Hyderabad
17:30 IST	Yasir 8'	Report		Stadium: G. M. C. Balayogi Athletic Stadium; Attendance: 10,126; Referee: R Venkatesh; Man of the Match: Poojari (Hyderabad)

9 November 2022 6	Jamshedpur	0–1	Hyderabad	Jamshedpur
19:30 IST	Sawyer (yellow card) 45+4'; Hartley (yellow card) 90+1'	Report	Mishra (yellow card) 34'; Yasir 48' (yellow card) 87'; Kumar (yellow card) 84'; Victor (yellow card) 90+5'	Stadium: JRD Tata Sports Complex; Attendance: 20,189; Referee: Pratik Mondal; Man of the Match: Onaindia (Hyderabad)

19 November 2022 7	Hyderabad	0–1	Kerala Blasters	Hyderabad
19:30 IST	Singh (yellow card) 77'; Siverio (yellow card) 90'	Report	Diamantakos 18'; Singh (yellow card) 69'; Mandal (yellow card) 88'; Rahul (yellow card) 90'; Gill (yellow card) 90+3'	Stadium: G. M. C. Balayogi Athletic Stadium; Attendance: 11,834; Referee: Pranjal Banerjee; Man of the Match: Kalyuzhnyi (Kerala Blasters)

26 November 2022 8	ATK Mohun Bagan	1–0	Hyderabad	Kolkata
19:30 IST	Boumous 11'; Kotal (yellow card) 18'; McHugh (yellow card) 84'; Hamill (yellow card) 85'	Report	Singh (yellow card) 11'; Sharma (yellow card) 41'; Onaindia (yellow card) 85'; Siverio (yellow card) 90+9'	Stadium: Vivekananda Yuba Bharati Krirangan; Attendance: 26,493; Referee: Harish Kundu; Man of the Match: Bose (ATK Mohun Bagan)

3 December 2022 9	Chennaiyin	1–3	Hyderabad	Chennai
17:30 IST	Kumar (yellow card) 49' (yellow-red card) 72'; Slišković 79'	Report	Narzary 66'; Singh 75'; Herrera 86'; Mishra (yellow card) 90+2'	Stadium: Jawaharlal Nehru Stadium; Attendance: 8,207; Referee: Rahul Kumar Gupta; Man of the Match: Singh (Hyderabad)

9 December 2022 10	Hyderabad	2–0	East Bengal	Hyderabad
19:30 IST	Yasir 38'; Siverio 85'	Report	Lalrinzuala (yellow card) 15'	Stadium: G. M. C. Balayogi Athletic Stadium; Attendance: 5,196; Referee: Senthil Nathan S Man of the Match: Yasir (Hyderabad)

23 December 2022 11	Bengaluru	0–3	Hyderabad	Bengaluru
19:30 IST	Jhingan (yellow card) 16'	Report	Ogbeche 26'; Jhingan 44' (o.g.); Singh (yellow card) 82'; Chianese 90'	Stadium: Sree Kanteerava Stadium; Attendance: 8,117; Referee: L Priyabotra Singh; Man of the Match: Ogbeche (Hyderabad)

29 December 2022 12	Hyderabad	6–1	NorthEast United	Hyderabad
19:30 IST	Siverio 8', 73'; Herrera 24'; Onaindia 30'; Chianese 77'; Bora 80' (o.g.)	Report	Evans 36'; Zoherliana (yellow card) 55'; Philippoteaux (yellow card) 90+3'	Stadium: G. M. C. Balayogi Athletic Stadium; Attendance: 5,907; Referee: I Jamal Mohamed; Man of the Match: Siverio (Hyderabad)

5 January 2023 13	Goa	1–3	Hyderabad	Margao
19:30 IST	Tlang 54'	Report	Ogbeche 21', 79', 90'; Herrera (yellow card) 27'; Chianese (yellow card) 42'; Tavora (yellow card) 69'	Stadium: Fatorda Stadium; Attendance: 8,327; Referee: Pranjal Banerjee; Man of the Match: Ogbeche (Hyderabad)

12 January 2023 14	Hyderabad	1–1	Chennaiyin	Hyderabad
19:30 IST	Ogbeche 87' (pen.); D'Silva (yellow card) 90+2'	Report	Slišković 57'; Mitra (yellow card) 87'	Stadium: G. M. C. Balayogi Athletic Stadium; Attendance: 6,427; Referee: Umesh Bora; Man of the Match: Düker (Chennaiyin)

20 January 2023 15	East Bengal	0–2	Hyderabad	Kolkata
19:30 IST	Rakip (yellow card) 13'; Vadakkepeedika (yellow card) 83'	Report	Siverio 9'; D'Silva 90+2'	Stadium: Vivekananda Yuba Bharati Krirangan; Attendance: 3,251; Referee: A Rowan; Man of the Match: Tamang (Hyderabad)

4 February 2023 16	Mumbai City	1–1	Hyderabad	Mumbai
17:30 IST	Griffiths (yellow card) 12'; Díaz 23' (pen.) (yellow card) 43'; Stalin (yellow card) 43'	Report	Poojari (yellow card) 22'; Sharma 65'; Mishra (yellow card) 86'	Stadium: Mumbai Football Arena; Attendance: 5,588; Referee: Harish Kundu; Man of the Match: Mishra (Hyderabad)

10 February 2023 17	Odisha	3–1	Hyderabad	Bhubaneswar
19:30 IST	Vanlalruatfela 33'; Meitei (yellow card) 51'; Tamang 73' (o.g.); Maurício 90+4' (yellow card) 90+5'	Report	Tamang 45'	Stadium: Kalinga Stadium; Attendance: 6,217; Referee: Aditya Purkayastha; Man of the Match: Vanlalruatfela (Odisha)

14 February 2023 18	Hyderabad	1–0	ATK Mohun Bagan	Hyderabad
19:30 IST	Ogbeche 86'; Chianese (yellow card) 90+5'	Report	Damjanović (yellow card) 21'	Stadium: G. M. C. Balayogi Athletic Stadium; Attendance: 4,873; Referee: CR Srikrishna; Man of the Match: Ogbeche (Hyderabad)

18 February 2023 19	Hyderabad	2–3	Jamshedpur	Hyderabad
17:30 IST	Ogbeche 12', 79'	Report	Das 22'; Emmanuel-Thomas 26' (pen.); Chukwu 29'; Sabiá (red card) 55'; Doungel (yellow card) 87'	Stadium: G. M. C. Balayogi Athletic Stadium; Attendance: 5,276; Referee: Pranjal Benarjee; Man of the Match: Sawyer (Jamshedpur)

26 February 2023 20	Kerala Blasters	0–1	Hyderabad	Kochi
19:30 IST	Mohanan (yellow card) 41'; Kalyuzhnyi (yellow card) 50'; Ruivah (yellow card) 81'; Lešković (yellow card) 84'	Report	Poojari (yellow card) 17'; Herrera 29'	Stadium: Jawaharlal Nehru Stadium; Attendance: 25,743; Referee: R Venkatesh; Man of the Match: Chianese (Hyderabad)

==== Playoffs ====
===== Semi-finals =====
9 March 2023 First leg	Hyderabad	0-0	ATK Mohun Bagan	Hyderabad
19:30 IST		Report		Stadium: G. M. C. Balayogi Athletic Stadium; Attendance: 12926; Referee: Harish Kundu; Man of the Match: Damjanović (ATK Mohun Bagan)

13 March 2023 Second leg	ATK Mohun Bagan	0-0 (a.e.t.) (4–3 p)	Hyderabad	Kolkata
19:30 IST		Report		Stadium: Vivekananda Yuba Bharati Krirangan; Attendance: 52507; Referee: CR Srikrishna; Man of the Match: Kaith (ATK Mohun Bagan)
	Penalties
	Petratos (penalty scored); Gallego (penalty scored); Singh (penalty scored); Hamill (penalty missed); Kotal (penalty scored)		(penalty scored) Victor; (penalty missed) Siverio; (penalty missed) Ogbeche; (penalty scored) Danu; (penalty scored) Reagan

=== Group B ===
Pos	Team	Pld	W	D	L	GF	GA	GD	Pts	Qualification	OFC	HYD	EAB	AIZ
1	Odisha	3	2	1	0	6	2	+4	7	Advance to knockout stage	—	—	1–1	—
2	Hyderabad	3	1	1	1	6	6	0	4		1–2	—	—	2–1
3	East Bengal	3	0	3	0	6	6	0	3		—	3–3	—	2–2
4	Aizawl	3	0	1	2	3	7	−4	1		0–3	—	—	—

Source: AIFF
Rules for classification: 1) points; 2) head-to-head points; 3) head-to-head goal difference; 4) goal difference; 5) number of goals scored; 6) drawing of lots

9 April 2023 1	Hyderabad	2–1	Aizawl	Manjeri
17.00 IST	Chianese 17'; Mohammed (yellow card) 36'; Victor 51' (pen.)	Report	Lalramsanga (yellow card) 11'; Lalchhawnkima (yellow card) 90'; Veras 90+6'	Stadium: Payyanad Stadium; Attendance: 452; Referee: Harish Kundu; Man of the Match: Joel Chianese (Hyderabad)

13 April 2023 Group Stage	East Bengal	3–3	Hyderabad	Manjeri
20:30 IST	Mahesh 4', 45'; Suhair 17'; Jervis (yellow card) 42'; Singh (yellow card) 73'	Report; Report; Match Summary	Siverio 11', 71' (yellow card) 90'; Rabeeh 83'	Stadium: Payyanad Stadium; Attendance: 3,772; Referee: Rowan Arumughan; Man of the Match: Javier Siverio (Odisha)

17 April 2023 3	Hyderabad	1–2	Odisha	Manjeri
20:30 IST	Siverio 11'; Poojari (yellow card) 39'; Sana (yellow card) 45+3'; Gurmeet (red card) 90+6'	Report	Maurício 55'; Panwar (yellow card) 57'; Rodríguez 86'	Stadium: Payyanad Stadium; Attendance: 1,860; Referee: Pranjal Banerjee; Man of the Match: Diego Maurício (Odisha)

=== Indian Additional Club Qualifiers For AFC Cup ===
3 May 2023	Hyderabad	1–1 (a.e.t.) (1–3 p)	ATK Mohun Bagan	Kozhikode, Kerala
19.00 IST	Reagan (yellow card) 10'; Chinglensana (yellow card) 23'; Chianese 44'; Tavora (yellow card) 61'; João MJT (yellow card) 112'; Mishra (yellow card) 120'	Report	Boumous (yellow card) 6'; Petratos 20', (yellow card) 23'; Damjanović (yellow card) 100'	Stadium: EMS Stadium; Attendance: 750; Referee: Venkatesh R Man of the Match: Carl McHugh (ATK Mohun Bagan)
	Penalties
	João MJT (penalty scored); (penalty missed) Tavora; (penalty missed) Chianese; (penalty missed) Odei		(penalty scored) D. Petratos; (penalty missed) McHugh; (penalty scored) Liston; (penalty scored) Kiyan

== Player statistics ==
=== Appearances and goals ===
No.	Pos.	Player	Indian Super League		Durand Cup	
No.	Pos.	Player	Apps	Goals	Apps	Goals
1	GK	(India) Gurmeet Singh	12	0	0	0
2	DF	(India) Reagan Singh	2 (5)	0	0 (1)	0
4	DF	(India) Chinglensana Singh	12	1	4 (1)	0
7	FW	(Australia) Joel Chianese	9 (9)	2	2 (2)	1
8	MF	(Brazil) João Victor	10 (2)	2	2 (4)	1
10	MF	(India) Mohammad Yasir	18	3	3 (2)	0
11	MF	(India) Sweden Fernandes	0	0	2 (1)	0
12	FW	(India) Aaren D'Silva	0 (14)	1	2	0
13	GK	(India) Lalbiakhlua Jongte	1	0	2	0
14	MF	(India) Sahil Tavora	3 (16)	0	1 (2)	0
16	DF	(Spain) Odei Onaindia	19	1	4 (1)	0
17	MF	(India) Lalchungnunga Chhangte	0 (2)	0	4 (2)	0
18	MF	(India) Hitesh Sharma	17	1	4	0
19	MF	(India) Halicharan Narzary	15 (2)	3	4 (2)	1
20	FW	(Nigeria) Bartholomew Ogbeche	17 (2)	10	3 (3)	5
23	GK	(India) Anuj Kumar	1 (1)	0	1	0
24	FW	(India) Rohit Danu	5 (6)	0	0	0
25	GK	(India) Laxmikant Kattimani	6	0	3	0
26	DF	(Spain) Borja Herrera	12 (8)	4	4 (1)	1
27	MF	(India) Nikhil Poojari	19	0	3 (2)	0
29	DF	(India) Nim Dorjee Tamang	9 (2)	1	3 (1)	0
31	DF	(India) Akash Mishra	17	0	4	1
40	GK	(India) Aman Kumar Sahani	0	0	0	0
41	DF	(India) Manoj Mohammed	3	0	3	0
43	DF	(India) Soyal Joshy	0	0	1	0
44	DF	(India) Alex Saji	0	0	2	0
77	MF	(India) Abdul Rabeeh	1 (15)	0	1 (1)	0
88	MF	(India) Mark Zothanpuia	0 (2)	0	2	0
99	FW	(Spain) Javier Siverio	12 (8)	5	2 (4)	1

Last updated: 1 March 2023.
Source: Competitions

=== Top scorers ===
Rank	No.	Pos	Player	Indian Super League	Durand Cup	Total
1	20	FW	(Nigeria) Bartholomew Ogbeche	10	5	15
2	99	FW	(Spain) Javier Siverio	5	1	6
3	26	DF	(Spain) Borja Herrera	4	1	5
4	19	MF	(India) Halicharan Narzary	3	1	4
5	7	FW	(Australia) Joel Chianese	2	1	3
5	8	MF	(Brazil) João Victor	2	1	3
5	10	MF	(India) Mohammad Yasir	3	0	3
8	4	DF	(India) Chinglensana Singh	1	0	1
8	12	FW	(India) Aaren D'Silva	1	0	1
8	16	DF	(Spain) Odei Onaindia	1	0	1
8	18	MF	(India) Hitesh Sharma	1	0	1
8	29	DF	(India) Nim Dorjee Tamang	1	0	1
8	31	DF	(India) Akash Mishra	0	1	1
Own goals				2	0	2
Total				36	11	47

Last updated: 1 March 2023.
Source: Competitions

=== Top assists ===
Rank	No.	Pos	Player	Indian Super League	Durand Cup	Total
1	26	DF	(Spain) Borja Herrera	5	3	8
2	19	MF	(India) Halicharan Narzary	6	1	7
3	10	MF	(India) Mohammad Yasir	4	2	6
4	77	MF	(India) Abdul Rabeeh	3	0	3
5	20	FW	(Nigeria) Bartholomew Ogbeche	2	0	2
6	16	DF	(Spain) Odei Onaindia	1	0	1
6	17	MF	(India) Lalchungnunga Chhangte	0	1	1
6	18	MF	(India) Hitesh Sharma	1	0	1
6	27	MF	(India) Nikhil Poojari	1	0	1
Total				23	7	30

Last updated: 1 March 2023.
Source: Competitions

=== Clean sheets ===
Rank	No.	Pos	Player	Indian Super League	Durand Cup	Total
1	1	GK	(India) Gurmeet Singh	5	0	5
2	25	GK	(India) Laxmikant Kattimani	4	1	5
3	13	GK	(India) Lalbiakhlua Jongte	0	1	1
3	23	GK	(India) Anuj Kumar	1	0	1
Total				10	2	12

Last updated: 1 March 2023.
Source: Competitions

=== Discipline ===
No.	Pos	Player	Indian Super League			Durand Cup			Total		
No.	Pos	Player	Booked	(yellow card) (yellow-red card)	Sent off (straight red)	Booked	(yellow card) (yellow-red card)	Sent off (straight red)	Booked	(yellow card) (yellow-red card)	Sent off (straight red)
1	GK	(India) Gurmeet Singh	1	0	0	0	0	0	1	0	0
4	DF	(India) Chinglensana Singh	3	0	0	1	0	0	4	0	0
7	FW	(Australia) Joel Chianese	2	0	0	0	0	0	2	0	0
8	MF	(Brazil) João Victor	1	0	0	2	0	0	3	0	0
10	MF	(India) Mohammad Yasir	1	0	0	1	0	0	2	0	0
12	FW	(India) Aaren D'Silva	1	0	0	1	0	0	2	0	0
13	GK	(India) Lalbiakhlua Jongte	0	0	0	1	0	0	1	0	0
14	MF	(India) Sahil Tavora	2	0	0	0	0	0	2	0	0
16	DF	(Spain) Odei Onaindia	2	0	0	1	0	0	3	0	0
18	MF	(India) Hitesh Sharma	2	0	0	0	0	0	2	0	0
23	GK	(India) Anuj Kumar	1	0	0	0	0	0	1	0	0
26	DF	(Spain) Borja Herrera	1	0	0	0	0	0	1	0	0
27	MF	(India) Nikhil Poojari	2	0	0	0	0	0	2	0	0
31	DF	(India) Akash Mishra	4	0	0	0	0	0	4	0	0
41	DF	(India) Manoj Mohammed	0	0	0	1	0	0	1	0	0
99	FW	(Spain) Javier Siverio	2	0	0	0	0	0	2	0	0
TOTALS			25	0	0	8	0	0	33	0	0

Last updated: 1 March 2023.
Source: Competitions

=== Summary ===
Competition	P	W	D	L	GF	GA	CS	Booked	(yellow card) (yellow-red card)	Sent off (straight red)
Indian Super League	20	13	3	4	36	16	10	25	0	0
Durand Cup	6	4	0	2	11	4	2	8	0	0

Last updated: 1 March 2023.
Source: Competitions
