= 2021–22 Hyderabad FC season =

2021–22 season of Hyderabad FC

Hyderabad
2021–22 season
- Head coach: Manolo Márquez
- Stadium: GMC Athletic Stadium
- Indian Super League: 2nd
- ISL Playoffs: Winners
- Top goalscorer: League: Bartholomew Ogbeche (18); All: Bartholomew Ogbeche (18)
- Biggest win: 6–1 (vs. Odisha, 28 December 2021, ISL)
- Biggest defeat: 0–3 (vs. Jamshedpur, 1 March 2022, ISL)
Home colours	Away colours
- All statistics correct as of 20 March 2022.

The 2021–22 Hyderabad FC season was the club's third competitive season since its inception in 2019. The season covered from 1 June 2021 to 31 May 2022.

== Kits ==
Home	Away

== Management team ==
As of 8 January 2022

Role	Name
Head coach	(Spain) Manolo Márquez
Assistant coach	(India) Thangboi Singto
Assistant coach	(Argentina) Benito Montalvo
Goalkeeping coach	(Spain) Marc Gamon
Fitness coach	(Spain) Alberto Linan

== Players ==
Players and squad numbers last updated on 20 March 2022. Appearances include all competitions.
Note: Flags indicate national team as has been defined under FIFA eligibility rules. Players may hold more than one non-FIFA nationality.

No.	Pos.	Player	Nationality	Date of birth (Age)	Signed in	Contract ends	Signed from	Apps	Goals
Goalkeepers
1	GK	Gurmeet Singh	(India)	3 December 1999 (aged 21)	2021	2024	(India) NorthEast United	1	0
13	GK	Lalbiakhlua Jongte	(India)	23 July 2002 (aged 18)	2020	2023	(India) Indian Arrows	0	0
25	GK	Laxmikant Kattimani	(India)	3 May 1989 (aged 32)	2019	2022	(India) Goa	42	0
Defenders
4	DF	Chinglensana Singh	(India)	27 November 1996 (aged 24)	2020	2025	(India) Goa	39	1
5	DF	Juanan	(Spain)	27 April 1987 (aged 34)	2021	2022	(India) Bengaluru	21	0
6	DF	Khassa Camara	(Mauritania)	22 October 1992 (aged 28)	2022	2022	(India) NorthEast United	7	1
29	DF	Nim Dorjee Tamang	(India)	30 October 1995 (aged 25)	2021	2024	(India) NorthEast United	9	0
31	DF	Akash Mishra	(India)	27 November 2001 (aged 19)	2020	2023	(India) Indian Arrows	43	2
32	DF	Amritpal Singh	(India)	9 January 2001 (aged 20)	2022	2022	(India) Hyderabad Reserves	1	0
33	DF	Pritam Kumar Singh	(India)	10 December 1995 (aged 25)	2021	2022	(India) East Bengal	2	0
44	DF	Asish Rai	(India)	2 February 1999 (aged 22)	2019	2023	(India) Pune City	48	0
	DF	Dimple Bhagat	(India)	12 December 1998 (aged 22)	2019	2022	(India) Gokulam Kerala	2	0
Midfielders
8	MF	João Victor ^{(C)}	(Brazil)	7 November 1988 (aged 32)	2020	2023	(Greece) OFI Crete	38	9
10	MF	Mohammad Yasir	(India)	14 April 1998 (aged 23)	2019	2023	(India) Pune City	49	2
14	MF	Sahil Tavora	(India)	19 October 1995 (aged 25)	2019	2022	(India) Mumbai City	31	1
17	MF	Seityasen Singh	(India)	12 March 1992 (aged 29)	2021	2022	(India) Kerala Blasters	3	0
18	MF	Hitesh Sharma	(India)	25 December 1997 (aged 23)	2020	2023	(India) ATK	25	0
19	MF	Halicharan Narzary	(India)	10 May 1994 (aged 27)	2020	2022	(India) Kerala Blasters	25	5
23	MF	Souvik Chakrabarti	(India)	12 July 1991 (aged 29)	2020	2023	(India) Mumbai City	26	0
27	MF	Nikhil Poojari	(India)	3 September 1995 (aged 25)	2019	2023	(India) Pune City	47	1
77	MF	Abdul Rabeeh	(India)	23 January 2001 (aged 20)	2021	2022	(India) Luca	3	0
88	MF	Mark Zothanpuia	(India)	22 April 2002 (aged 19)	2020	2024	(India) Hyderabad Reserves	3	0
Forwards
7	FW	Joel Chianese	(Australia)	15 February 1990 (aged 31)	2020	2022	(Australia) Perth Glory	31	7
9	FW	Aniket Jadhav	(India)	13 July 2000 (aged 20)	2021	2024	(India) Jamshedpur	20	2
12	FW	Aaren D'Silva	(India)	12 December 1997 (aged 23)	2021	2024	(India) Goa	9	0
20	FW	Bartholomew Ogbeche	(Nigeria)	1 October 1984 (aged 36)	2021	2022	(India) Mumbai City	20	18
24	FW	Rohit Danu	(India)	10 July 2002 (aged 18)	2020	2023	(India) Indian Arrows	22	2
99	FW	Javier Siverio	(Spain)	14 November 1997 (aged 23)	2021	2022	(Spain) Las Palmas B	23	7
	FW	Ishan Dey	(India)	1 July 2000 (aged 20)	2020	2022	(India) Hyderabad Reserves	0	0

== New contracts ==
No.	Position	Player	Date	Until	Source
8	MF	(Brazil) João Victor	16 July 2021	31 May 2023	
4	DF	(India) Chinglensana Singh	5 August 2021	31 May 2025	

== Transfers ==
=== In ===
Date	No.	Pos.	Player	From	Fee	Source
Summer
18 June 2021	12	FW	(India) Aaren D'Silva	(India) Goa	Free transfer	
22 June 2021	77	MF	(India) Abdul Rabeeh	(India) Luca	Free transfer	
8 July 2021	20	FW	(Nigeria) Bartholomew Ogbeche	(India) Mumbai City	Free transfer	
12 July 2021	11	MF	(Spain) Edu García	(India) ATK Mohun Bagan	Free transfer	
21 July 2021	9	FW	(India) Aniket Jadhav	(India) Jamshedpur	Free transfer	
26 July 2021	5	DF	(Spain) Juanan	(India) Bengaluru	Free transfer	
30 July 2021	1	GK	(India) Gurmeet Singh	(India) NorthEast United	Free transfer	
30 July 2021	29	DF	(India) Nim Dorjee Tamang	(India) NorthEast United	Undisclosed	
18 August 2021	33	DF	(India) Pritam Kumar Singh	(India) East Bengal	Free transfer	
30 August 2021	99	FW	(Spain) Javier Siverio	(India) Las Palmas B	Free transfer	
11 September 2021		GK	(India) Abhinav Mulagada	(India) ATK Mohun Bagan	Free transfer	
Winter
12 February 2022	6	DF	(Mauritania) Khassa Camara	(India) NorthEast United	Free transfer	

=== Out ===
Date	No.	Pos.	Player	To	Fee	Source
Summer
1 June 2021	6	FW	(Spain) Lluís Sastre	(Spain) SD Huesca B	Free transfer	
1 June 2021	9	FW	(Spain) Aridane Santana	(Spain) UD Logroñés	Free transfer	
1 June 2021	12	FW	(India) Liston Colaco	(India) ATK Mohun Bagan	Undisclosed	
1 June 2021	16	DF	(Spain) Odei Onaindia	(Spain) CD Mirandés	Free transfer	
1 June 2021	17	MF	(India) Laldanmawia Ralte	(India) NorthEast United	Free transfer	
1 June 2021	21	FW	(Spain) Francisco Sandaza	(Spain) Extremadura UD	Free transfer	
1 June 2021	29	DF	(India) Kynsailang Khongsit	(India) Bengaluru United	Free transfer	
1 June 2021	36	DF	(India) Sahil Panwar	(India) Odisha	Undisclosed	
1 June 2021		MF	(India) Deependra Negi	(India) Garhwal	Free transfer	
1 June 2021		MF	(India) Abhishek Halder	(India) Mohammedan	Undisclosed	
Winter
12 February 2022	11	MF	(Spain) Edu García	(China) Sichuan Jiuniu	Free transfer	

=== Loan in ===
No.	Pos.	Player	From	Date	Until	Fee	Source
Winter
17	MF	(India) Seityasen Singh	(India) Kerala Blasters	29 December 2021	31 May 2022	Undisclosed	

=== Loan out ===
No.	Pos.	Player	To	Date	Until	Fee	Source
Summer
34	MF	(India) Sweden Fernandes	(India) NEROCA	3 July 2021	31 May 2022	Undisclosed	
20	FW	(India) Lalawmpuia	(India) Sudeva	28 July 2021	31 May 2022	Undisclosed	
	GK	(India) Anuj Kumar	(India) Aizawl	21 August 2021	31 May 2022	Undisclosed	
	GK	(India) Adil Khan	(India) East Bengal	31 August 2021	31 May 2022	Undisclosed	
99	GK	(India) Manas Dubey	(India) TRAU	22 September 2021	31 May 2022	Undisclosed	
Winter
22	DF	(India) Nikhil Prabhu	(India) Odisha	30 December 2021	31 May 2022	Undisclosed	
	GK	(India) Subrata Pal	(India) ATK Mohun Bagan	28 January 2022	31 May 2022	Undisclosed	

== Pre-season ==
28 August 2021 Friendly	Hyderabad	2–0	Sreenidi Deccan	Kolkata
17:00 IST	Zothanpuia; Chhangte	Report

24 September 2021 Friendly	Hyderabad	4–1	Kenkre	Mumbai
19:00 IST	Siverio 2'; Ogbeche; D'Silva	Report	Fernandes

2 October 2021 Friendly	Hyderabad	4–2	Salgaocar	Goa
19:00 IST	Siverio; Danu; Ogbeche; D'Silva	Report

8 October 2021 Friendly	Hyderabad	2–1	Churchill Brothers	Goa
19:00 IST	Tamang; Chianese	Report

15 October 2021 Friendly	Hyderabad	2–1	Gokulam Kerala	Goa
16:00 IST	Tamang; Chianese	Report	Sourav

31 October 2021 Friendly	Mumbai City	2–1	Hyderabad	Goa
16:00 IST	Angulo; Singh	Report	Ogbeche

8 November 2021 Friendly	NorthEast United	1–1	Hyderabad	Goa
16:00 IST	Coureur	Report	Narzary

16 November 2021 Friendly	Odisha	2–1	Hyderabad	Navelim, Goa
16:00 IST	Lalruatthara; Vanlalruatfela	Report	Siverio

== Competitions ==
=== Durand Cup ===
Hyderabad FC made their debut in 130th edition of the Durand Cup. Hyderabad were drawn in Group D alongside Assam Rifles, Army Red and Gokulam Kerala.

==== Group stage ====
Pos	Team	Pld	W	D	L	GF	GA	GD	Pts	Qualification
1	Gokulam Kerala	3	2	1	0	10	4	+6	7	Knockout stage
2	Army Red	3	2	1	0	8	4	+4	7	Knockout stage
3	Hyderabad	3	1	0	2	6	3	+3	3	
4	Assam Rifles	3	0	0	3	3	16	−13	0	

Rules for classification: 1) points; 2) head-to-head points; 3) head-to-head goal difference; 4) goal difference; 5) number of goals scored; 6) drawing of lots

12 September 2021 1	Assam Rifles	0–5	Hyderabad	Kolkata
15:00 IST		Report	Rabeeh 7'; Chhangte 18', 89'; Rohlupia 21'; Kabrabam 27'	Stadium: Mohun Bagan Ground; Man of the Match: Chhangte (Hyderabad)

16 September 2021 2	Gokulam Kerala	1–0	Hyderabad	Kalyani
15:00 IST	Osumanu 46'; Benny (yellow card) (yellow-red card) 48'; Mukhammad (yellow card) 57'	Report		Stadium: Kalyani Stadium; Man of the Match: Sharif Mukhammad (Gokulam Kerala)

19 September 2021 3	Army Red	2–1	Hyderabad	Kolkata
15:00 IST	Shil 33', 70'	Report	Dutta 35'	Stadium: Salt Lake Stadium; Man of the Match: Liton Shil (Army Red)

=== Indian Super League ===
==== League stage ====
The fixtures for the first 10 rounds were announced on 13 September 2021. Hyderabad started their season with a narrow 0-1 loss to the Chennaiyin. They later went on an eight-match unbeaten streak including a 2-2 draw against the ATK Mohun Bagan to climb to the top of the league table for the first time in their history. The fixtures for the later 10 rounds were announced on 21 December 2021. Hyderabad lost to Kerala Blasters in the fight for the top position of league table with the lone goal in the match scored by Álvaro Vázquez for Kerala Blasters. Hyderabad finished third in the league table at halfway-stage.

Hyderabad had a good run of results in their next eight rounds including six wins and once again climbed to the top of the table. They also became first team to qualify for the playoffs with two games to spare after their 2-1 win against the Kerala Blasters. Hyderabad lost to Jamshedpur with many of their first-team players missing the match due to Covid-19. This loss put them out of contention for the league winners' shield. They won their final league match against the defending champions, Mumbai City finishing second in the league stage.

===== League table =====
Pos	Team	Pld	W	D	L	GF	GA	GD	Pts	Qualification
1	Jamshedpur (L)	20	13	4	3	42	21	+21	43	Qualification to ISL playoffs and Playoffs for 2023–24 AFC Champions League group stage
2	Hyderabad (Note: Hyderabad qualified for Playoffs for 2023–24 AFC Cup qualifying playoffs by winning the ISL playoffs) (C)	20	11	5	4	43	23	+20	38	Qualification to ISL playoffs and Playoffs for 2023–24 AFC Cup qualifying playoffs
3	ATK Mohun Bagan	20	10	7	3	37	26	+11	37	Qualification to ISL playoffs
4	Kerala Blasters	20	9	7	4	34	24	+10	34	Qualification to ISL playoffs
5	Mumbai City	20	9	4	7	36	31	+5	31	

Source: Indian Super League
Rules for classification: 1) points; 2) head-to-head points; 3) head-to-head goal difference; 4) head-to-head goals scored; 5) goal difference; 6) number of goals scored; 7) fair play ranking; 8) drawing of lots
(C) Champions; (L) League Winners' Shield Winners

===== Results by matchday =====
Matchday	1	2	3	4	5	6	7	8	9	10	11	12	13	14	15	16	17	18	19	20
Ground	H	A	A	H	H	A	H	H	A	A	A	A	A	A	H	A	H	H	H	H
Result	L	W	D	W	W	D	D	W	D	L	D	W	W	W	L	W	W	W	L	W
Position	8	5	6	4	3	2	2	2	1	3	3	1	1	1	1	1	1	1	3	2

Updated to match(es) played on 7 March 2022. Source: soccerway
A = Away; H = Home; W = Win; D = Draw; L = Loss

===== Matches =====
23 November 2021 1	Hyderabad	0–1	Chennaiyin	Bambolim
19:30 IST		Report	Ali (yellow card) 59'; Das (yellow card) 64'; Koman 66' (pen.)	Stadium: GMC Athletic Stadium; Referee: Pranjal Banerjee; Man of the Match: Koman (Chennaiyin)

27 November 2021 2	Mumbai City	1–3	Hyderabad	Margao
21:30 IST	Jahouh 6' (yellow card) 55'; Catatau (yellow card) 90+2'	Report	Victor 13' (pen.); Sharma (yellow card) 46'; Singh (yellow card) 48'; Ogbeche 53'; Danu 82'	Stadium: Fatorda Stadium; Referee: Pratik Mondal; Man of the Match: Victor (Hyderabad)

2 December 2021 3	Jamshedpur	1–1	Hyderabad	Bambolim
19:30 IST	Stewart 41' (yellow card) 77'; Halder (yellow card) 77'; Renthlei (yellow card) 89'	Report	Ogbeche 54'; Victor (yellow card) 80'	Stadium: GMC Athletic Stadium; Referee: Pratik Mondal; Man of the Match: Stewart (Jamshedpur)

8 December 2021 4	Hyderabad	1–0	Bengaluru	Bambolim
19:30 IST	Ogbeche 7'; Jadhav (yellow card) 85'	Report	Singh (yellow card) 29'; Wangjam (yellow card) 39'	Stadium: GMC Athletic Stadium; Referee: Harish Kundu; Man of the Match: Chakrabarti (Hyderabad)

13 December 2021 5	Hyderabad	5–1	NorthEast United	Bambolim
19:30 IST	Singh 12'; Ogbeche 27', 78'; Tavora (yellow card) 82'; Jadhav 90'; Kattimani (yellow card) 90'; Siverio 90+4'	Report	Flottmann (yellow card) 6'; Ralte 43'; Santana (yellow card) 81'; Shereef (yellow card) 90+2'	Stadium: GMC Athletic Stadium; Referee: Ashwin; Man of the Match: Rai (Hyderabad)

18 December 2021 6	Goa	1–1	Hyderabad	Bambolim
21:30 IST	Fernandes (yellow card) 28'; Cabrera 62'; Noguera (yellow card) 69'; Pereira (yellow card) 80'	Report	Danu (yellow card) 26'; Chianese (yellow card) 34' (goal) 54'; Victor (yellow card) 42'; Rai (yellow card) 52'; Ogbeche (yellow card) 88'	Stadium: GMC Athletic Stadium; Referee: R Venkatesh; Man of the Match: Cabrera (Goa)

23 December 2021 7	Hyderabad	1–1	East Bengal	Bambolim
19:30 IST	Ogbeche 35'; Juanan (yellow card) 90+4'	Report	Dervišević 20'; Singh (yellow card) 90+2'	Stadium: GMC Athletic Stadium; Referee: Aditya Purkayastha; Man of the Match: Hnamte (East Bengal)

28 December 2021 8	Hyderabad	6–1	Odisha	Bambolim
19:30 IST	Sailung 8' (o.g.); Ogbeche 39', 60' (yellow card) 44'; García 54'; Siverio 72'; Victor 86' (pen.)	Report	Rodas (yellow card) 8'; Juanan 16' (o.g.); Krasniqi (yellow card) 54'	Stadium: GMC Athletic Stadium; Referee: Ashwin; Man of the Match: Ogbeche (Hyderabad)

5 January 2022 9	ATK Mohun Bagan	2–2	Hyderabad	Margao
19:30 IST	Williams 1' (yellow card) 53'; Mehta (yellow card) 39'; Boumous (yellow card) 59'; Rai 64' (o.g.)	Report	Ogbeche 18' (yellow card) 29'; Rai (yellow card) 58'; Siverio 90+1'	Stadium: Fatorda Stadium; Referee: Rahul Kumar Gupta; Man of the Match: Rai (Hyderabad)

9 January 2022 10	Kerala Blasters	1–0	Hyderabad	Vasco
19:30 IST	Khabra (yellow card) 7'; Vázquez 42'; Singh (yellow card) 64'; Carneiro (yellow card) 83'; Gill (yellow card) 90+2'	Report	Ogbeche (yellow card) 10'; Tavora (yellow card) 66'; Siverio (yellow card) 74'; Danu (yellow card) 83'; Juanan (yellow card) 85'	Stadium: Tilak Maidan Stadium; Referee: Pranjal Benarjee; Man of the Match: Vázquez (Kerala Blasters)

13 January 2022 11	Chennaiyin	1–1	Hyderabad	Margao
19:30 IST	Dhot 13'; Damjanović (yellow card) 72'	Report	Jadhav (yellow card) 37'; Siverio 45+4'; Victor (yellow card) 85'	Stadium: Fatorda Stadium; Referee: Rahul Kumar Gupta; Man of the Match: Majumder (Chennaiyin)

24 January 2022 12	East Bengal	0–4	Hyderabad	Vasco
19:30 IST	Mukherjee (yellow card) 26'	Report	Ogbeche 21', 44', 74'; Rai (yellow card) 38'; Jadhav 45+1'	Stadium: Tilak Maidan Stadium; Referee: Rahul Kumar Gupta; Man of the Match: Ogbeche (Hyderabad)

27 January 2022 13	Odisha	2–3	Hyderabad	Vasco
19:30 IST	Hernández (yellow card) 39'; Mawihmingthanga 45'; Krasniqi (yellow card) 71'; Jonathas 84'	Report	Chakrabarti (yellow card) 10'; Chianese 52' (yellow card) 90+2'; Victor 70'; Mishra 73'	Stadium: Tilak Maidan Stadium; Referee: C. R. Srikrishna; Man of the Match: Mishra (Hyderabad)

31 January 2022 14	NorthEast United	0–5	Hyderabad	Margao
19:30 IST	Sahanek (yellow card) 26'; Khan (yellow card) 45+1'; Kumar (yellow card) 59'; Marcelinho (yellow card) 74'; Diallo (yellow card) 90+4'	Report	Ogbeche 3', 60'; Mishra 45+3'; Poojari 84'; García 88'	Stadium: Fatorda Stadium; Referee: R Venkatesh; Man of the Match: Ogbeche (Hyderabad)

8 February 2022 15	Hyderabad	1–2	ATK Mohun Bagan	Bambolim
19:30 IST	Chianese 67'; Tavora (yellow card) 80'; Rai (yellow card) 81'	Report	Das (yellow card) 12'; Colaco 56'; Singh 59'; Boumous (yellow card) 68'	Stadium: GMC Athletic Stadium; Referee: Harish Kundu; Man of the Match: Colaco (ATK Mohun Bagan)

11 February 2022 16	Bengaluru	1–2	Hyderabad	Bambolim
19:30 IST	Siverio 16'; Victor 30'; Juanan (yellow card) 64'	Report	Bhat (yellow card) 27'; Shrivas (yellow card) 43'; Singh (yellow card) 82'; Chhetri 87'	Stadium: GMC Athletic Stadium; Referee: Tejas Nagvenkar; Man of the Match: Victor (Hyderabad)
Note: The match was initially scheduled for 1 March 2022 but moved to 11 February 2022 in the revised calendar.

19 February 2022 17	Hyderabad	3–2	Goa	Bambolim
21:30 IST	Singh (yellow card) 18'; Ogbeche 25', 41'; Chakrabarti (yellow card) 45+1'; Mishra (yellow card) 58'; Victor 70'	Report	Chote (yellow card) 15'; Ortiz 35'; Murgaonkar 73'; Bedia (yellow card) 84'	Stadium: GMC Athletic Stadium; Referee: A Rowan; Man of the Match: Ogbeche (Hyderabad)
Note: The match was initially scheduled for 14 February 2022 but moved to 19 February 2022 in the revised calendar.

23 February 2022 18	Hyderabad	2–1	Kerala Blasters	Margao
19:30 IST	Juanan (yellow card) 25'; Ogbeche 28'; Chakrabarti (yellow card) 45+1'; Siverio 87'	Report	Praveen (yellow card) 83'; Barretto 90+5'; Khabra (yellow card) 90+6'	Stadium: Fatorda Stadium; Referee: Harish Kundu; Man of the Match: Juanan (Hyderabad)
Note: The match was initially scheduled for 19 February 2022 but moved to 23 February 2022 in the revised calendar.

1 March 2022 19	Hyderabad	0–3	Jamshedpur	Bambolim
19:30 IST	Yasir (yellow card) 37'; Jadhav (yellow card) 45+2'; Poojari (yellow card) 68'; Siverio (yellow card) 79'	Report	Singh 5' (o.g.); Hartley 28'; Chukwu 65'; Rahman (red card) 68'	Stadium: GMC Athletic Stadium; Referee: R Venkatesh; Man of the Match: Lima (Jamshedpur)
Note: The match was initially scheduled for 17 January 2022 but postponed to 1 March 2022 due to an insufficient amount of available players in the Jamshedpur squad as a result of COVID-19 and recent injuries.

5 March 2022 20	Hyderabad	2–1	Mumbai City	Margao
19:30 IST	Danu 14'; Chianese 41'	Report	Fall 76'	Stadium: Fatorda Stadium; Referee: Harish Kundu; Man of the Match: Chakrabarti (Hyderabad)
Note: The match was initially scheduled for 24 February 2022 but moved to 5 March 2022 in the revised calendar.

==== Playoffs ====
The fixtures for the playoff were confirmed on 7 March 2022 with the Hyderabad playing against the ATK Mohun Bagan over the two legs in the semifinals. Hyderabad started slowly in the first leg and went trailing 0-1 with Roy Krishna giving the lead for the ATK Mohun Bagan. Bartholomew Ogbeche equalized just before the half-time for the Hyderabad and the dominant second half saw the Hyderabad winning the match 3-1 with the second-half goals coming from Mohammad Yasir and Javier Siverio. This gave them a two-goal lead going into the second leg. They advanced 3-2 on aggregate despite losing 0-1 in the second leg with Krishna scoring the only goal of the match for ATK Mohun Bagan. This meant that the Hyderabad reached the final for the first-time in their history.

In the final at Fatorda, Hyderabad tied 1-1 against the Kerala Blasters at the end of the regular time as the match went into extra-time. No goals from the either team in extra-time forced the match to penalty shootout. Laxmikant Kattimani saved three penalties in the shoot-out as Hyderabad defeated Kerala Blasters 3-1 on penalties to lift the ISL trophy for the first-time. Halicharan Narzary scored the winning penalty for the Hyderabad while Kattimani was adjudged hero of the match for his saves in the shootout.

===== Semi-finals =====
12 March 2022 First leg	Hyderabad	3–1	ATK Mohun Bagan	Bambolim
19:30 IST	Ogbeche 45+3'; Yasir 58'; Siverio 64'	Report	Krishna 18'	Stadium: GMC Athletic Stadium; Referee: Rahul Kumar Gupta; Man of the Match: Ogbeche (Hyderabad)

16 March 2022 Second leg	ATK Mohun Bagan	1–0 (2–3 agg.)	Hyderabad	Bambolim
19:30 IST	Singh (yellow card) 59'; Krishna 79'	Report	Ogbeche (yellow card) 43'; Mishra (yellow card) 59'	Stadium: GMC Athletic Stadium; Referee: R Venkatesh; Man of the Match: Kattimani (Hyderabad)

===== Final =====
20 March 2022 Final	Hyderabad	1–1 (a.e.t.) (3–1 p)	Kerala Blasters	Margao
19:30 IST	Tavora 88'	Report	Singh (yellow card) 4'; Praveen 68'; Díaz (yellow card) 81'	Stadium: Fatorda Stadium; Attendance: 11550; Referee: Crystal John; Man of the Match: Kattimani (Hyderabad)
	Penalties
	Victor (penalty scored); Siverio (penalty missed); Camara (penalty scored); Narzary (penalty scored)		Lešković (penalty missed); Kumar (penalty missed); Adhikari (penalty scored); Singh (penalty missed)

== Player statistics ==
=== Appearances and goals ===
No.	Pos.	Player	ISL	
No.	Pos.	Player	Apps	Goals
1	GK	(India) Gurmeet Singh	1	0
4	DF	(India) Chinglensana Singh	21	1
5	DF	(Spain) Juanan	20 (1)	0
6	DF	(Mauritania) Khassa Camara	2 (5)	1
7	FW	(Australia) Joel Chianese	12 (7)	4
8	MF	(Brazil) João Victor	21	6
9	FW	(India) Aniket Jadhav	15 (5)	2
10	MF	(India) Mohammad Yasir	9 (7)	1
12	FW	(India) Aaren D'Silva	0 (9)	0
13	GK	(India) Lalbiakhlua Jongte	0	0
14	MF	(India) Sahil Tavora	0 (19)	1
17	MF	(India) Seityasen Singh	0 (3)	0
18	MF	(India) Hitesh Sharma	10	0
19	MF	(India) Halicharan Narzary	1 (4)	1
20	FW	(Nigeria) Bartholomew Ogbeche	20	18
23	MF	(India) Souvik Chakrabarti	14 (2)	0
24	FW	(India) Rohit Danu	8 (9)	2
25	GK	(India) Laxmikant Kattimani	22	0
27	MF	(India) Nikhil Poojari	16 (3)	1
29	DF	(India) Nim Dorjee Tamang	8 (1)	0
31	DF	(India) Akash Mishra	22 (1)	2
32	DF	(India) Amritpal Singh	0 (1)	0
33	DF	(India) Pritam Kumar Singh	0 (2)	0
44	DF	(India) Asish Rai	15 (1)	0
77	MF	(India) Abdul Rabeeh	1 (2)	0
88	MF	(India) Mark Zothanpuia	0 (3)	0
99	FW	(Spain) Javier Siverio	8 (15)	7
	DF	(India) Dimple Bhagat	0	0
	FW	(India) Ishan Dey	0	0
Players have left the club
11	MF	(Spain) Edu García	7 (4)	2
22	DF	(India) Nikhil Prabhu	0	0
	GK	(India) Subrata Pal	0	0

Last updated: 20 March 2022.
Source: Competitions

=== Top scorers ===
Rank	No.	Pos	Player	ISL
1	20	FW	(Nigeria) Bartholomew Ogbeche	18
2	99	FW	(Spain) Javier Siverio	7
3	8	MF	(Brazil) João Victor	6
4	7	FW	(Australia) Joel Chianese	4
5	9	FW	(India) Aniket Jadhav	2
5	11	MF	(Spain) Edu García	2
5	24	FW	(India) Rohit Danu	2
5	31	DF	(India) Akash Mishra	2
9	4	DF	(India) Chinglensana Singh	1
9	6	DF	(Mauritania) Khassa Camara	1
9	10	MF	(India) Mohammad Yasir	1
9	14	MF	(India) Sahil Tavora	1
9	19	MF	(India) Halicharan Narzary	1
9	27	MF	(India) Nikhil Poojari	1
Own goals				1
Total				50

Last updated: 20 March 2022.
Source: Competitions

=== Top assists ===
Rank	No.	Pos	Player	ISL
1	5	DF	(Spain) Juanan	3
1	7	FW	(Australia) Joel Chianese	3
1	9	FW	(India) Aniket Jadhav	3
1	10	MF	(India) Mohammad Yasir	3
1	31	DF	(India) Akash Mishra	3
1	44	DF	(India) Asish Rai	3
7	18	MF	(India) Hitesh Sharma	2
7	23	MF	(India) Souvik Chakrabarti	2
7	27	MF	(India) Nikhil Poojari	2
10	8	MF	(Brazil) João Victor	1
10	11	MF	(Spain) Edu García	1
10	12	FW	(India) Aaren D'Silva	1
10	14	MF	(India) Sahil Tavora	1
10	20	FW	(Nigeria) Bartholomew Ogbeche	1
10	24	FW	(India) Rohit Danu	1
10	99	FW	(Spain) Javier Siverio	1
Total				31

Last updated: 20 March 2022.
Source: Competitions

=== Clean sheets ===
Rank	No.	Pos	Player	ISL
1	25	GK	(India) Laxmikant Kattimani	3
Total				3

Last updated: 20 March 2022.
Source: Competitions

=== Discipline ===
No.	Pos	Player	ISL		
No.	Pos	Player	Yellow card	(yellow card) (yellow-red card)	Red card
4	DF	(India) Chinglensana Singh	2	0	0
5	DF	(Spain) Juanan	4	0	0
7	FW	(Australia) Joel Chianese	2	0	0
8	MF	(Brazil) João Victor	3	0	0
9	FW	(India) Aniket Jadhav	3	0	0
10	MF	(India) Mohammad Yasir	1	0	0
14	MF	(India) Sahil Tavora	3	0	0
18	MF	(India) Hitesh Sharma	1	0	0
20	FW	(Nigeria) Bartholomew Ogbeche	5	0	0
23	MF	(India) Souvik Chakrabarti	3	0	0
24	FW	(India) Rohit Danu	2	0	0
25	GK	(India) Laxmikant Kattimani	1	0	0
27	MF	(India) Nikhil Poojari	1	0	0
31	DF	(India) Akash Mishra	2	0	0
44	DF	(India) Asish Rai	4	0	0
99	FW	(Spain) Javier Siverio	2	0	0
TOTALS			39	0	0

Last updated: 20 March 2022.
Source: Competitions

=== Summary ===
Competition	P	W	D	L	GF	GA	CS	Yellow card	(yellow card) (yellow-red card)	Red card
Indian Super League	23	13	5	5	50	27	3	39	0	0

Last updated: 20 March 2022.
Source: Competitions

== Awards ==
=== Players ===
No.	Pos.	Player	Award	Source
20	FW	(Nigeria) Bartholomew Ogbeche	ISL Hero of the Month (January)	
20	FW	(Nigeria) Bartholomew Ogbeche	Indian Super League Golden Boot	
20	FW	(Nigeria) Bartholomew Ogbeche	FPAI Foreign Player of the Year	
20	FW	(India) Akash Mishra	FPAI Young Player of the Year (Men)	

=== Manager ===
Manager	Award	Source
(Spain) Manolo Márquez	FPAI Coach of the Year	
