= 2020–21 Hyderabad FC season =

2020–21 season of Hyderabad FC

Hyderabad
2020–21 season
- Head coach: Albert Roca (until 29 August 2020); Manolo Márquez (from 31 August 2020)
- Stadium: Tilak Maidan Stadium
- Indian Super League: 5th
- Top goalscorer: League: Aridane Santana (10); All: Aridane Santana (10)
- Biggest win: 4–0 (vs. Kerala Blasters, 16 February 2021, ISL)
- Biggest defeat: 0–2 (vs. Mumbai City, 20 December 2020, ISL) (vs. Kerala Blasters, 27 December 2020, ISL)
| Home colours | Away colours | Third colours |
- All statistics correct as of 23 February 2021.

The 2020–21 Hyderabad FC season was the club's second competitive season since its inception in 2019. The season covered the period from 1 June 2020 to 31 May 2021.

The Hyderabad finished fifth in the Indian Super League following the draw against the Goa in their last league stage match and hence missing out narrowly on the ISL playoffs.

== Background ==
In the view of ongoing COVID-19 pandemic, the entire season of Indian Super League was decided to be played in the empty stadiums in Goa. The tournament was scheduled to be played at three venues, Nehru Stadium in Fatorda, Tilak Maidan Stadium in Vasco da Gama and G.M.C Stadium in Bambolim.

On 29 August, Albert Roca parted ways with the Hyderabad to join the F.C. Barcelona as fitness coach under Ronald Koeman. On 31 August, Manolo Márquez took charge as new head coach of the Hyderabad.

== Kits ==
| Home | Away | Third |

== Management team ==
| Role | Name |
|---|---|
| Head coach | (Spain) Manolo Márquez |
| Assistant coach | (Spain) Xavier Gurri López |
| Assistant coach | (India) Thangboi Singto |
| Head of Performance Analysis | (India) Joy Gabriel M |
| Goalkeeping coach | (Spain) Marc Gamon |
| Fitness coach | (Spain) Jose Carlos Barroso |

== Players ==
| No. | Pos. | Player | Nationality | Date of birth (age) | Since | Ends | Apps | Goals |
|---|---|---|---|---|---|---|---|---|
| 3 | MF | Roland Alberg | (Suriname) | 6 August 1990 (aged 29) | 2020 | 2021 | 8 | 1 |
| 4 | DF | Chinglensana Singh | (India) | 27 November 1996 (aged 23) | 2020 | 2022 | 18 | 0 |
| 6 | MF | Lluís Sastre | (Spain) | 26 March 1986 (aged 34) | 2020 | 2021 | 12 | 0 |
| 8 | MF | João Victor | (Brazil) | 7 November 1988 (aged 31) | 2020 | 2021 | 17 | 3 |
| 9 | FW | Aridane Santana ^{(C)} | (Spain) | 31 March 1987 (aged 33) | 2020 | 2021 | 18 | 10 |
| 10 | MF | Mohammad Yasir | (India) | 14 April 1998 (aged 22) | 2019 | 2023 | 33 | 1 |
| 11 | MF | Abhishek Halder | (India) | 5 October 1999 (aged 20) | 2019 | 2022 | 12 | 0 |
| 12 | FW | Liston Colaco | (India) | 12 November 1998 (aged 21) | 2020 | 2022 | 23 | 4 |
| 13 | GK | Lalbiakhlua Jongte | (India) | 23 July 2002 (aged 17) | 2020 | 2023 | 0 | 0 |
| 14 | MF | Sahil Tavora | (India) | 19 October 1995 (aged 24) | 2019 | 2022 | 12 | 0 |
| 15 | DF | Dimple Bhagat | (India) | 12 December 1998 (aged 21) | 2019 | 2022 | 2 | 0 |
| 16 | DF | Odei Onaindia | (Spain) | 7 December 1989 (aged 30) | 2020 | 2021 | 20 | 0 |
| 17 | MF | Laldanmawia Ralte | (India) | 19 December 1992 (aged 27) | 2019 | 2021 | 7 | 0 |
| 18 | MF | Hitesh Sharma | (India) | 25 December 1997 (aged 22) | 2020 | 2023 | 15 | 0 |
| 19 | MF | Halicharan Narzary | (India) | 10 May 1994 (aged 26) | 2020 | 2022 | 20 | 4 |
| 20 | FW | Lalawmpuia | (India) | 24 October 1999 (aged 20) | 2020 | 2023 | 2 | 0 |
| 21 | FW | Francisco Sandaza | (Spain) | 30 November 1984 (aged 35) | 2020 | 2021 | 11 | 4 |
| 22 | DF | Nikhil Prabhu | (India) | 2 October 2000 (aged 19) | 2020 | 2023 | 0 | 0 |
| 23 | DF | Souvik Chakrabarti | (India) | 12 July 1991 (aged 28) | 2020 | 2023 | 10 | 0 |
| 24 | FW | Rohit Danu | (India) | 10 July 2002 (aged 17) | 2020 | 2023 | 5 | 0 |
| 25 | GK | Laxmikant Kattimani | (India) | 3 May 1989 (aged 31) | 2019 | 2022 | 20 | 0 |
| 27 | MF | Nikhil Poojari | (India) | 3 September 1995 (aged 24) | 2019 | 2023 | 28 | 0 |
| 29 | DF | Kynsailang Khongsit | (India) | 11 December 2000 (aged 19) | 2020 | 2021 | 0 | 0 |
| 31 | DF | Akash Mishra | (India) | 27 November 2001 (aged 18) | 2020 | 2023 | 20 | 0 |
| 34 | MF | Sweden Fernandes | (India) | 18 February 2000 (aged 20) | 2020 | 2023 | 0 | 0 |
| 35 | MF | Mark Zothanpuia | (India) | 22 April 2002 (aged 18) | 2020 | 2024 | 0 | 0 |
| 36 | DF | Sahil Panwar | (India) | 15 December 1999 (aged 20) | 2019 | 2022 | 15 | 0 |
| 44 | DF | Asish Rai | (India) | 2 February 1999 (aged 21) | 2019 | 2023 | 32 | 0 |
| 55 | GK | Sankar Roy | (India) | 9 May 1995 (aged 25) | 2021 | 2021 | 0 | 0 |
| 70 | FW | Ishan Dey | (India) | 1 July 2000 (aged 19) | 2020 | 2022 | 0 | 0 |
| 99 | GK | Manas Dubey | (India) | 8 October 2001 (aged 18) | 2020 | 2023 | 0 | 0 |
| | MF | Deependra Negi | (India) | 20 November 1998 (aged 21) | 2019 | 2021 | 0 | 0 |

Last updated: 23 April 2021.
Source: Indian Super League

== New contracts ==
| No. | Position | Player | Date | Until | Source |
|---|---|---|---|---|---|
| | GK | (India) Anuj Kumar | 30 September 2020 | 31 May 2023 | |
| 22 | DF | (India) Nikhil Prabhu | 30 September 2020 | 31 May 2022 | |
| 99 | GK | (India) Manas Dubey | 26 October 2020 | 31 May 2023 | |
| 35 | MF | (India) Mark Zothanpuia | 26 October 2020 | 31 May 2024 | |
| 70 | FW | (India) Ishan Dey | 26 October 2020 | 31 May 2022 | |
| 29 | DF | (India) Kynsailang Khongsit | 26 October 2020 | 31 May 2021 | |
| 18 | MF | (India) Hitesh Sharma | 10 March 2021 | 31 May 2023 | |
| 7 | FW | (Australia) Joel Chianese | 12 April 2021 | 31 May 2022 | |
| 25 | GK | (India) Laxmikant Kattimani | 23 April 2021 | 31 May 2022 | |

| Coach | Date | Until | Source |
|---|---|---|---|
| (Spain) Manolo Márquez | 10 February 2021 | 31 May 2023 | |

== Transfers ==
=== In ===
| Date | No. | Pos. | Player | From | Fee | Source |
Summer
| 4 June 2020 | 1 | GK | (India) Subrata Pal | (India) Jamshedpur | Free transfer | |
| 13 August 2020 | 19 | MF | (India) Halicharan Narzary | (India) Kerala Blasters | Free transfer | |
| 28 August 2020 | 43 | MF | (Brazil) João Victor | (Greece) OFI Crete | Free transfer | |
| 3 September 2020 | 7 | FW | (Australia) Joel Chianese | (Australia) Perth Glory | Free transfer | |
| 5 September 2020 | 4 | DF | (India) Chinglensana Singh | (India) Goa | Free transfer | |
| 8 September 2020 | 6 | MF | (Spain) Lluís Sastre | (Cyprus) AEK Larnaca | Free transfer | |
| 14 September 2020 | 20 | FW | (India) Lalawmpuia | (India) Goa | Free transfer | |
| 14 September 2020 | 34 | MF | (India) Sweden Fernandes | (India) Goa | Free transfer | |
| 17 September 2020 | 9 | FW | (Spain) Aridane Santana | (Spain) Cultural Leonesa | Free transfer | |
| 19 September 2020 | 16 | DF | (Spain) Odei Onaindia | (Spain) Mirandés | Free transfer | |
| 21 September 2020 | 21 | FW | (Spain) Francisco Sandaza | (Spain) Alcorcón | Free transfer | |
| 14 October 2020 | | MF | (India) Koustav Dutta | (India) RF Youth Sports | Free transfer | |
| 16 October 2020 | 24 | FW | (India) Rohit Danu | (India) Indian Arrows | Undisclosed | |
| 16 October 2020 | 31 | DF | (India) Akash Mishra | (India) Indian Arrows | Undisclosed | |
| 16 October 2020 | 13 | GK | (India) Lalbiakhlua Jongte | (India) Indian Arrows | Free transfer | |

=== Out ===
| Date | No. | Pos. | Player | To | Fee | Source |
Summer
| 1 June 2020 | 1 | GK | (India) Kamaljit Singh | (India) Odisha | Free transfer | |
| 1 June 2020 | 4 | DF | (Spain) Rafa | Unattached | | |
| 1 June 2020 | 6 | DF | (England) Matthew Kilgallon | (England) Buxton | Free transfer | |
| 1 June 2020 | 7 | FW | (Jamaica) Giles Barnes | Unattached | | |
| 1 June 2020 | 9 | FW | (Brazil) Bobô | (Brazil) Oeste | Free transfer | |
| 1 June 2020 | 10 | FW | (Brazil) Marcelinho | (India) Odisha | Free transfer | |
| 1 June 2020 | 13 | DF | (India) Gurtej Singh | (India) East Bengal | Free transfer | |
| 1 June 2020 | 15 | MF | (Austria) Marko Stanković | Retired | | |
| 1 June 2020 | 16 | MF | (India) Shankar Sampingiraj | (India) Chennai City | | |
| 1 June 2020 | 19 | MF | (India) Rohit Kumar | (India) Kerala Blasters | Free transfer | |
| 1 June 2020 | 22 | MF | (India) Gani Nigam | (India) Mohammedan | Free transfer | |
| 1 June 2020 | 23 | FW | (India) Robin Singh | Unattached | | |
| 1 June 2020 | 34 | DF | (India) Tarif Akhand | (India) Chennai City | Free transfer | |
| 1 June 2020 | 40 | GK | (India) Kunzang Bhutia | (India) Bengaluru United | Free transfer | |
| 1 June 2020 | | MF | (India) Faheem Ali | (India) Kerala United | Free transfer | |
| 1 June 2020 | | DF | (India) Keenan Almeida | (India) Churchill Brothers | Free transfer | |
| 1 June 2020 | | DF | (India) Abhash Thapa | (India) Real Kashmir | Free transfer | |
Winter
| 31 January 2021 | | MF | (Spain) Néstor Gordillo | (Poland) Kalisz | Free transfer | |

=== Loan in ===
| No. | Pos. | Player | From | Date | Until | Fee | Source |
Winter
| 3 | MF | (Suriname) Roland Alberg | (Netherlands) Roda JC Kerkrade | 28 December 2020 | 31 May 2021 | Undisclosed | |
| | GK | (India) Sankar Roy | (India) East Bengal | 26 January 2021 | 31 May 2021 | Undisclosed | |

=== Loan out ===
| No. | Pos. | Player | To | Date | Until | Fee | Source |
Summer
| | GK | (India) Anuj Kumar | (India) Real Kashmir | 2 November 2020 | 31 May 2021 | Undisclosed | |
Winter
| 5 | DF | (India) Adil Khan | (India) Goa | 22 January 2021 | 31 May 2021 | Undisclosed | |
| 1 | GK | (India) Subrata Pal | (India) East Bengal | 26 January 2021 | 31 May 2021 | Undisclosed | |
| 7 | FW | (Australia) Joel Chianese | (Australia) Perth Glory | 12 April 2021 | End of season | Undisclosed | |

== Pre-season ==
| 25 October 2020 Friendly | Hyderabad | 0–2 | Kerala Blasters | Parra |
| 16:00 | | Report | Rahul 2' |

| 7 November 2020 Friendly | Bengaluru | 1–1 | Hyderabad | Ella |
| 16:00 | Muirang | Report | Santana (pen.) | Stadium: Dempo SC Ground |

| 11 November 2020 Friendly | Hyderabad | 4–2 | Goa | Panaji |
| 16:00 | Lalawmpuia; Halder 2'; Danu | Report | Chote; Fernandes | Stadium: Don Bosco Ground |

| 14 November 2020 Friendly | NorthEast United | 2–1 | Hyderabad | Candolim |
| 16:00 | Appiah; Machado | Report | Santana | Stadium: Candolim Panchayat Ground |

== Competitions ==
=== Indian Super League ===
==== League table ====
| Pos | Team | Pld | W | D | L | GF | GA | GD | Pts | Qualification |
|---|---|---|---|---|---|---|---|---|---|---|
| 3 | NorthEast United | 20 | 8 | 9 | 3 | 31 | 25 | +6 | 33 | Qualification to ISL playoffs |
| 4 | Goa | 20 | 7 | 10 | 3 | 31 | 23 | +8 | 31 | Qualification to ISL playoffs |
| 5 | Hyderabad | 20 | 6 | 11 | 3 | 27 | 19 | +8 | 29 | |
| 6 | Jamshedpur | 20 | 7 | 6 | 7 | 21 | 22 | −1 | 27 | |
| 7 | Bengaluru | 20 | 5 | 7 | 8 | 26 | 28 | −2 | 22 | |

Source: Indian Super League
Rules for classification: 1) points; 2) head-to-head points; 3) head-to-head goal difference; 4) head-to-head goals scored; 5) goal difference; 6) number of goals scored; 7) fair play ranking; 8) drawing of lots

==== Results by matchday ====
| Matchday | 1 | 2 | 3 | 4 | 5 | 6 | 7 | 8 | 9 | 10 | 11 | 12 | 13 | 14 | 15 | 16 | 17 | 18 | 19 | 20 |
|---|---|---|---|---|---|---|---|---|---|---|---|---|---|---|---|---|---|---|---|---|
| Ground | A | A | H | A | H | H | A | H | A | A | A | H | A | H | H | H | A | H | H | A |
| Result | W | D | D | D | W | L | L | L | W | W | D | D | D | D | W | D | D | W | D | D |
| Position | 3 | 3 | 4 | 6 | 5 | 6 | 8 | 8 | 6 | 3 | 4 | 4 | 4 | 4 | 3 | 4 | 5 | 3 | 5 | 5 |

Updated to match(es) played on 28 February 2021. Source: soccerway
A = Away; H = Home; W = Win; D = Draw; L = Loss

==== Matches ====
| 23 November 2020 1 | Odisha | 0–1 | Hyderabad | Bambolim |
| 19:30 IST (UTC+05:30) | Taylor (yellow card) 34'; Bora (yellow card) 60'; Antonay (yellow card) 70'; Meher (yellow card) 79'; Sarangi (yellow card) 82' | Report | Santana 35' (pen.) (yellow card) 84' | Stadium: GMC Stadium; Attendance: 0 Referee: Tejas Nagvenkar; Man of the Match: Santana (Hyderabad) |

| 28 November 2020 2 | Bengaluru | 0–0 | Hyderabad | Margao |
| 19:30 IST (UTC+05:30) | Paartalu (yellow card) 23'; Khabra (yellow card) 83' | Report | | Stadium: Fatorda Stadium; Attendance: 0 Referee: Mb Santhosh Kumar; Man of the Match: Singh (Hyderabad) |

| 2 December 2020 3 | Hyderabad | 1–1 | Jamshedpur | Vasco |
| 19:30 IST (UTC+05:30) | Santana 50' | Report | Eze (yellow card) 50' (goal) 85'; Jadhav (yellow card) 63'; Hartley (yellow card) 87' | Stadium: Tilak Maidan Stadium; Attendance: 0 Referee: Raktim Saha; Man of the Match: Yasir (Hyderabad) |

| 11 December 2020 4 | ATK Mohun Bagan | 1–1 | Hyderabad | Margao |
| 19:30 IST (UTC+05:30) | Rathi (yellow card) 39'; Das (yellow card) 45+3'; Bhattacharya (yellow card) 45+5'; Singh 54' | Report | Chakrabarti (yellow card) 16'; Victor (yellow card) 45+5' (goal) 65' (pen.) | Stadium: Fatorda Stadium; Attendance: 0 Referee: Harish Kundu; Man of the Match: Colaco (Hyderabad) |

| 15 December 2020 5 | Hyderabad | 3–2 | East Bengal | Vasco |
| 19:30 IST (UTC+05:30) | Santana 56', 56'; Narzary 68' | Report | Maghoma 26', 81'; Irshad (yellow card) 49'; Steinmann (yellow card) 74'; Ambekar (yellow card) 83'; Das (yellow card) 90+3'; Holloway (yellow card) 90+4' | Stadium: Tilak Maidan Stadium; Attendance: 0 Referee: L Ajitkumar Meitei; Man of the Match: Santana (Hyderabad) |

| 20 December 2020 6 | Hyderabad | 0–2 | Mumbai City | Vasco |
| 17:00 IST (UTC+05:30) | Santana (yellow card) 18'; Colaco (yellow card) 84' | Report | Dakshinamurthy 38' (yellow card) 69'; Le Fondre 52'; Singh (yellow card) 84'; Borges (yellow card) 90+1' | Stadium: Tilak Maidan Stadium; Attendance: 0 Referee: L Ajitkumar Meitei; Man of the Match: Jahouh (Mumbai City) |

| 27 December 2020 7 | Kerala Blasters | 2–0 | Hyderabad | Bambolim |
| 19:30 IST (UTC+05:30) | Samad (yellow card) 20'; Nediyodath 29'; Thounaojam (yellow card) 32'; Pereyra (yellow card) 86'; Murray 88' | Report | Ralte (yellow card) 90+2' | Stadium: GMC Stadium; Attendance: 0 Referee: Ranjit Baksi; Man of the Match: Thounaojam (Kerala Blasters) |

| 30 December 2020 8 | Hyderabad | 1–2 | Goa | Vasco |
| 19:30 IST (UTC+05:30) | Santana 58'; Chakrabarti (yellow card) 59'; Mishra (yellow card) 63'; Sastre (yellow card) 68' | Report | Pandita 87'; Angulo 90+1' | Stadium: Tilak Maidan Stadium; Attendance: 0 Referee: CR Srikrishna; Man of the Match: Angulo (Goa) |

| 4 January 2021 9 | Chennaiyin | 1–4 | Hyderabad | Bambolim |
| 19:30 IST (UTC+05:30) | Ali (yellow card) 42'; Thapa 67'; Chhangte (yellow card) 87'; Memo (yellow card) 89' | Report | Chianese 50'; Narzary 53', 79'; Victor 74' | Stadium: GMC Stadium; Attendance: 0 Referee: Mb Santhosh Kumar; Man of the Match: Narzary (Hyderabad) |

| 8 January 2021 10 | NorthEast United | 2–4 | Hyderabad | Vasco |
| 19:30 IST (UTC+05:30) | Shereef (yellow card) 6'; Machado (yellow card) 40'; Gallego 45' (pen.); Lambot 45+1' | Report | Santana 3'; Chianese 36'; Rai (yellow card) 41'; Narzary (yellow card) 44'; Mishra (yellow card) 63'; Colaco 85', 90+3'; Onaindia (yellow card) 88' | Stadium: Tilak Maidan Stadium; Attendance: 0 Referee: Rahul Kumar Gupta; Man of the Match: Chianese (Hyderabad) |

| 16 January 2021 11 | Mumbai City | 0–0 | Hyderabad | Bambolim |
| 19:30 IST (UTC+05:30) | Santana (yellow card) 69'; Singh (yellow card) 83'; Le Fondre (yellow card) 85' | Report | Singh (yellow card) 35' | Stadium: GMC Stadium; Attendance: 0 Referee: A Rowan; Man of the Match: Sharma (Hyderabad) |

| 19 January 2021 12 | Hyderabad | 1–1 | Odisha | Margao |
| 19:30 IST (UTC+05:30) | Narzary 13' | Report | Alexander 51' (yellow card) 90+4'; Dhot (yellow card) 53'; Onwu (yellow card) 56'; Rai (yellow card) 82' | Stadium: Fatorda Stadium; Attendance: 0 Referee: Mb Santosh Kumar; Man of the Match: Alexander (Odisha) |

| 24 January 2021 13 | Jamshedpur | 0–0 | Hyderabad | Vasco |
| 17:00 IST (UTC+05:30) | Hartley (yellow card) 49'; Lourenco (yellow card) 75' | Report | Sharma (yellow card) 23' | Stadium: Tilak Maidan Stadium; Attendance: 0 Referee: Rahul Kumar Gupta; Man of the Match: Santana (Hyderabad) |

| 28 January 2021 14 | Hyderabad | 2–2 | Bengaluru | Vasco |
| 19:30 IST (UTC+05:30) | Santana 86'; Sandaza 90+1'; Danu (yellow card) 90+2' | Report | Chhetri 9'; González (yellow card) 16'; Shrivas (yellow card) 54'; Augustine 61'; Paartalu (yellow card) 82' | Stadium: Tilak Maidan Stadium; Attendance: 0 Referee: Pranjal Banerjee; Man of the Match: Santana (Hyderabad) |

| 31 January 2021 15 | Hyderabad | 2–0 | Chennaiyin | Vasco |
| 17:00 IST (UTC+05:30) | Sandaza 28'; Santana (yellow card) 66'; Chianese 83'; Alberg (yellow card) 90+6' | Report | Singh (yellow card) 11'; Memo (yellow card) 59'; Tangri (yellow card) 87' | Stadium: Tilak Maidan Stadium; Attendance: 0 Referee: A Rowan; Man of the Match: Rai (Hyderabad) |

| 7 February 2021 16 | Hyderabad | 0–0 | NorthEast United | Vasco |
| 19:30 IST (UTC+05:30) | Sandaza (yellow card) 20'; Mishra (yellow card) 84' | Report | | Stadium: Tilak Maidan Stadium; Attendance: 0 Referee: Harish Kundu; Man of the Match: Lalengmawia (NorthEast United) |

| 12 February 2021 17 | East Bengal | 1–1 | Hyderabad | Vasco |
| 19:30 IST (UTC+05:30) | Gaikwad (yellow card) 56'; Enobakhare 59'; Pal (yellow card) 88' | Report | Victor (yellow card) 54'; Santana 90+2'; Yasir (red card) 90+4' | Stadium: Tilak Maidan Stadium; Attendance: 0 Referee: L Ajitkumar Meitei; Man of the Match: Mishra (Hyderabad) |

| 16 February 2021 18 | Hyderabad | 4–0 | Kerala Blasters | Vasco |
| 19:30 IST (UTC+05:30) | Sandaza 58', 63' (pen.); Santana 86'; Victor 90+1' | Report | Singh (yellow card) 45+1'; Gomes (yellow card) 62'; Meitei (yellow card) 68'; Nhamoinesu (yellow card) 79' | Stadium: Tilak Maidan Stadium; Attendance: 0 Referee: L Ajitkumar Meitei; Man of the Match: Santana (Hyderabad) |

| 22 February 2021 19 | Hyderabad | 2–2 | ATK Mohun Bagan | Vasco |
| 19:30 IST (UTC+05:30) | Singh (red card) 5'; Santana 8' (yellow card) 70'; Chianese (yellow card) 45+1'; Alberg 75'; Kattimani (yellow card) 86' | Report | Singh (yellow card) 14' (goal) 57'; Jhingan (yellow card) 55'; Bose (yellow card) 62'; Thatal (yellow card) 82'; Kotal 90+3' | Stadium: Tilak Maidan Stadium; Attendance: 0 Referee: L Ajitkumar Meitei; Man of the Match: Santana (Hyderabad) |

| 28 February 2021 20 | Goa | 0–0 | Hyderabad | Margao |
| 17:00 IST (UTC+05:30) | Donachie (yellow card) 33'; Bedia (yellow card) 55'; Tlang (yellow card) 57'; Noguera (yellow card) 83' (yellow-red card) 87'; González (yellow card) 90+8' | Report | Chakrabarti (yellow card) 42'; João Victor (yellow card) 64'; Sastre (red card) 86' | Stadium: Fatorda Stadium; Attendance: 0 Referee: Banerjee Pranjal; Man of the Match: Khan (Goa) |

== Player statistics ==
=== Appearances and goals ===
| No. | Pos. | Player | ISL | |
| No. | Pos. | Player | Apps | Goals |
|---|---|---|---|---|
| 3 | MF | (Suriname) Roland Alberg | 1 (7) | 1 |
| 4 | DF | (India) Chinglensana Singh | 18 | 0 |
| 6 | MF | (Spain) Lluís Sastre | 9 (3) | 0 |
| 7 | FW | (Australia) Joel Chianese | 11 (1) | 3 |
| 8 | MF | (Brazil) João Victor | 17 | 3 |
| 9 | FW | (Spain) Aridane Santana | 18 | 10 |
| 10 | MF | (India) Mohammad Yasir | 13 (5) | 0 |
| 11 | MF | (India) Abhishek Halder | 0 (4) | 0 |
| 12 | FW | (India) Liston Colaco | 9 (10) | 2 |
| 13 | GK | (India) Lalbiakhlua Jongte | 0 | 0 |
| 14 | MF | (India) Sahil Tavora | 0 (10) | 0 |
| 15 | DF | (India) Dimple Bhagat | 0 | 0 |
| 16 | DF | (Spain) Odei Onaindia | 20 | 0 |
| 17 | MF | (India) Laldanmawia Ralte | 0 (2) | 0 |
| 18 | MF | (India) Hitesh Sharma | 13 (2) | 0 |
| 19 | MF | (India) Halicharan Narzary | 18 (2) | 4 |
| 20 | FW | (India) Lalawmpuia | 0 (2) | 0 |
| 21 | FW | (Spain) Francisco Sandaza | 4 (6) | 4 |
| 22 | DF | (India) Nikhil Prabhu | 0 | 0 |
| 23 | DF | (India) Souvik Chakrabarti | 4 (3) | 0 |
| 24 | FW | (India) Rohit Danu | 0 (6) | 0 |
| 25 | GK | (India) Laxmikant Kattimani | 14 | 0 |
| 27 | MF | (India) Nikhil Poojari | 7 (3) | 0 |
| 29 | DF | (India) Kynsailang Khongsit | 0 | 0 |
| 31 | DF | (India) Akash Mishra | 20 | 0 |
| 34 | MF | (India) Sweden Fernandes | 0 | 0 |
| 35 | MF | (India) Mark Zothanpuia | 0 | 0 |
| 36 | DF | (India) Sahil Panwar | 0 (3) | 0 |
| 44 | DF | (India) Asish Rai | 18 | 0 |
| 55 | GK | (India) Sankar Roy | 0 | 0 |
| 70 | FW | (India) Ishan Dey | 0 | 0 |
| 99 | GK | (India) Manas Dubey | 0 | 0 |
Players have left the club
| 1 | GK | (India) Subrata Pal | 6 | 0 |
| 5 | DF | (India) Adil Khan | 0 (5) | 0 |

Last updated: 3 March 2021.
Source: Competitions

=== Top scorers ===
| Rank | No. | Pos | Player | ISL |
|---|---|---|---|---|
| 1 | 9 | FW | (Spain) Aridane Santana | 10 |
| 2 | 19 | MF | (India) Halicharan Narzary | 4 |
| 2 | 21 | FW | (Spain) Francisco Sandaza | 4 |
| 4 | 7 | FW | (Australia) Joel Chianese | 3 |
| 4 | 8 | MF | (Brazil) João Victor | 3 |
| 6 | 12 | FW | (India) Liston Colaco | 2 |
| 7 | 3 | MF | (India) Roland Alberg | 1 |
| Own goals | | | | 0 |
| Total | | | | 27 |

Last updated: 3 March 2021.
Source: Competitions

=== Top assists ===
| Rank | No. | Pos | Player | ISL |
|---|---|---|---|---|
| 1 | 12 | FW | (India) Liston Colaco | 3 |
| 2 | 8 | MF | (Brazil) João Victor | 2 |
| 2 | 9 | FW | (Spain) Aridane Santana | 2 |
| 2 | 10 | MF | (India) Mohammad Yasir | 2 |
| 2 | 21 | FW | (Spain) Francisco Sandaza | 2 |
| 2 | 44 | DF | (India) Asish Rai | 2 |
| 7 | 3 | MF | (Suriname) Roland Alberg | 1 |
| 7 | 6 | MF | (Spain) Lluís Sastre | 1 |
| 7 | 7 | FW | (Australia) Joel Chianese | 1 |
| 7 | 31 | DF | (India) Akash Mishra | 1 |
| Total | | | | 17 |

Last updated: 3 March 2021.
Source: Competitions

=== Clean sheets ===
| Rank | No. | Pos | Player | ISL |
|---|---|---|---|---|
| 1 | 25 | GK | (India) Laxmikant Kattimani | 6 |
| 2 | 1 | GK | (India) Subrata Pal | 2 |
| Total | | | | 8 |

Last updated: 3 March 2021.
Source: Competitions

=== Discipline ===
| No. | Pos | Player | ISL | | |
| No. | Pos | Player | Booked | (yellow card) (yellow-red card) | Sent off (straight red) |
|---|---|---|---|---|---|
| 3 | MF | (Suriname) Roland Alberg | 1 | 0 | 0 |
| 4 | DF | (India) Chinglensana Singh | 1 | 0 | 1 |
| 6 | FW | (Spain) Lluís Sastre | 1 | 0 | 1 |
| 7 | FW | (Australia) Joel Chianese | 1 | 0 | 0 |
| 8 | FW | (Brazil) João Victor | 3 | 0 | 0 |
| 9 | FW | (Spain) Aridane Santana | 4 | 0 | 0 |
| 10 | MF | (India) Mohammad Yasir | 0 | 0 | 1 |
| 12 | FW | (India) Liston Colaco | 1 | 0 | 0 |
| 16 | DF | (Spain) Odei Onaindia | 1 | 0 | 0 |
| 17 | MF | (India) Laldanmawia Ralte | 1 | 0 | 0 |
| 18 | MF | (India) Hitesh Sharma | 1 | 0 | 0 |
| 19 | MF | (India) Halicharan Narzary | 1 | 0 | 0 |
| 21 | FW | (Spain) Francisco Sandaza | 1 | 0 | 0 |
| 23 | DF | (India) Souvik Chakrabarti | 3 | 0 | 0 |
| 24 | FW | (India) Rohit Danu | 1 | 0 | 0 |
| 25 | GK | (India) Laxmikant Kattimani | 1 | 0 | 0 |
| 31 | DF | (India) Akash Mishra | 3 | 0 | 0 |
| 44 | DF | (India) Asish Rai | 1 | 0 | 0 |
| TOTALS | | | 26 | 0 | 3 |

Last updated: 3 March 2021.
Source: Competitions

=== Summary ===
| Competition | P | W | D | L | GF | GA | CS | Booked | (yellow card) (yellow-red card) | Sent off (straight red) |
|---|---|---|---|---|---|---|---|---|---|---|
| Indian Super League | 20 | 6 | 11 | 3 | 27 | 19 | 8 | 26 | 0 | 3 |

Last updated: 3 March 2021.
Source: Competitions

== Awards ==
=== Players ===
| No. | Pos. | Player | Award | Source |
|---|---|---|---|---|
| 9 | FW | (Spain) Aridane Santana | HFC's Player of the Month (February) | |
| 16 | DF | (Spain) Odei Onaindia | HFC's Player of the Month (January) | |
| 31 | DF | (India) Akash Mishra | HFC's Player of the Month (December) | |
| 31 | DF | (India) Akash Mishra | ISL Emerging Player of the Month (January) | |
