= Akash Mishra =

Indian footballer (born 2001)

Personal information
- Date of birth: 27 November 2001 (age 24)
- Place of birth: Balrampur, Uttar Pradesh, India
- Height: 1.78 m (5 ft 10 in)
- Position: Left-back

Team information
- Current team: Mumbai City
- Number: 31

Youth career
- -2018: U Dream Football Academy

Senior career*
Years	Team	Apps	(Gls)
2018–2020	Indian Arrows	23	(0)
2020–2023	Hyderabad	68	(3)
2023–	Mumbai City	27	(1)

International career^{‡}
2018–2021	India U20	10	(2)
2021–	India U23	3	(0)
2021–	India	37	(1)
Medal record
Men's football
Representing India
SAFF Championship
Winner	2023 India
- * Club domestic league appearances and goals as of 19:00, 8 December 2023 (UTC) ‡ National team caps and goals as of 22:00, 6 October 2026 (UTC)

Akash Mishra (Hindi: आकाश मिश्रा; born 27 November 2001) is an Indian professional footballer who plays as a left-back for Indian Super League club Mumbai City, which he captains, and the India national team.

== Early career ==
Born in Uttar Pradesh, and was selected for Guru Gobind Singh Sports College, Lucknow as an trainee athlete when he was in 6th standard in school. Akash began his football career by joining the U Dream Football Academy in 2015. He stayed at the U Dream Football Academy in Germany for three-years, and returned to India in 2018, when Indian Arrows came calling for Akash after he made it to the India U18 team.

== Club career ==
=== Indian Arrows ===
Akash penned his first professional contract with I-League club Indian Arrows. He made his professional debut in the 2018–19 I-League season against Shillong Lajong FC on 13 January 2019 as a substitute for Rohit Danu, which ended in a 0–3 victory for Indian Arrows. He made it to the lineup for the first time against NEROCA FC on 1 February, which ended in a 2–3 defeat for the Arrows. Akash played his last match of the season on 24 February 2019 against Real Kashmir FC, which ended in a thrilling 2–2 draw. He stayed at the club for the 2019–20 I-League season, and played his first of the season against Gokulam Kerala on 6 December 2019, which Indian Arrows lost 0–1. Akash played his last match for the club against TRAU FC on 8 March 2020, which ended 0–1 to TRAU. After the 2019–20 I-League season, after making 23 appearances over two seasons for the club, Akash left Indian Arrows for the Indian Super League club Hyderabad FC.

=== Hyderabad ===
==== 2020–21 ISL season: Debut and breakthrough ====
On 16 October 2020, it was announced that Hyderabad FC have signed Akash Mishra, along with Rohit Danu and Biaka Jongte under a three-year contract. He made his debut on 23 November 2020 in Hyderabad's opening match of the season against Odisha, which ended 0–1 to Hyderabad. Mishra had an impressive spell with the club, and was one of the developmental players to clock most number of minutes during the season. After his standout performance in the month of January in 2021, he was awarded with the Emerging Player of the Month award by the Indian Super League jury. He gradually developed into one of the most important players in the team, and won his first ever Hero of the Match award in the match against SC East Bengal on 12 February 2021, which ended in a 1–1 draw. Akash had a tremendous debut season, as he appeared in every match for Hyderabad in the 2020–21 Indian Super League, and was ranked second for the most number of tackles made by a defender that season with 80 tackles in his name, and was also ranked second in terms of most number of interceptions by a player that season with a figure of 55 interceptions, and 48 clearances, and 37 blocks in his name in his debut ISL campaign.

On 21 June 2022, Hyderabad announced that Akash Mishra has penned a new three-year contract extension till the end of the 2024–25 season. However, during his stay in Japan, the possibility of joining J2 League side Machida Zelvia came out but he was retained by Hyderabad and appeared in pre-season training ahead of the 2022 Durand Cup kickoff.

Following a strong 2022-23 ISL campaign, Mishra won the 2022–23 AIFF Emerging Player of the Year award.

=== Mumbai City ===
==== 2023-24 season ====
On 19 June 2023, Akash left Hyderabad to join Mumbai City, for a record transfer fee for an Indian player of Rs. 3 crore. As part of the deal, left-back Vignesh Dakshinamurthy went to Hyderabad FC on a permanent transfer as well.

Akash made his debut for The Islanders in the 2023–24 AFC Champions League against Uzbek club Nassahi Mazandaran on 18 September 2023, ending in a 0–2 loss. He made his ISL debut for the club on 24 September 2023, away against Northeast United, ending in a 1–2 victory for Mumbai City. His first ISL goal for the club came away against Bengaluru, with a spectacular long-range strike from outside the area on his weaker foot, the second goal in an eventual 0–4 victory.

Two matches later, against Mohun Bagan on 20 December 2023, Akash was sent off for a rash challenge on Manvir Singh in the 13th minute. His red card was the first out of a remarkable seven red cards throughout the course of the match, as Mumbai City eventually won 2–1, thanks to a deflected Bipin Singh winner in the 73rd minute. After the match, it was confirmed that he was given a 3-match ban due to his sending-off.

After serving his ban, Akash returned to the team, playing the full 90 minutes at left-back away against East Bengal in an eventual 1–0 win for The Islanders. Mumbai went on to lose the ISL Shield on the final day, losing 2–1 away to Mohun Bagan.

In the ISL playoffs, Akash started the first leg away against Goa on 24 April, but was forced to be substituted in the 13th minute due to injury. Mumbai went on to win the playoff 2-3 following a late comeback. Mumbai City later confirmed that Akash had suffered an anterior cruciate ligament injury which required surgery to repair, which would rule him out for the rest of the 2024 calendar year. On 31 May, Akash confirmed via social media that his ACL surgery had been completed, and had "gone well".

==== 2025-26 season ====
Following 551 days out with his ACL injury, Mishra returned to action in the 2025–26 Super Cup, starting in the club's opening match against SC Delhi. Mumbai went on to win the match 4–1. However, Mumbai City lost 2–1 in the semifinals against Goa.

Mishra played all 13 of Mumbai City's games in the shortened 2025-26 season, registering two assists as the club finished third.

==== 2026-27 season ====
Ahead of the 2026-27 season, following the departure of Lallianzuala Chhangte, Mumbai City announced Mishra had been appointed as the new club captain. His captaincy debut came in an away game against Churchill Brothers, which ended in a 2–1 loss.

== International career ==
=== Youth ===
Akash was a part of India national under-20 football team, that won the 2019 SAFF U-18 Championship in Bangladesh. He played seven matches in the tournament, and scored two goals along the way. After the SAFF U-18 Championship, Akash was again called up for the under-18 team to compete in the 2019 Granatkin Memorial tournament. He scored a goal in the last group stage match of India against Bulgaria on 9 June 2019, which helped India to clinch a 1–1 draw. Akash appeared in all three matches for India in the tournament, and registered one goal in his name.

=== Senior ===
Akash was included in the 35-member list of probables for the India national team's back-to-back friendlies against Oman and the UAE. On 25 March 2021, he made his senior international debut in a friendly match against Oman, along with 9 other debutants, which ended in a 1–1 draw. He was then called up for the Indian squad to play their rest of the matches in the 2022 FIFA World Cup qualifiers against Qatar, Bangladesh and Afghanistan respectively. In March 2022, he was included in the national squad ahead of India's two friendly matches against Bahrain and Belarus. On March 31, 2026, he scored his first international goal in a 2–1 win against Hongkong in AFC Asian Cup Qualifications.

== Style of play ==
Akash is a left-back, who is praised by many for his prolific display down the flanks. He is known for his positioning on the pitch, and is also known for his crosses down the wings. His coach at Hyderabad, Manolo Marquez, praised him, after he made his debut for the club in the post-match conference by adding, "I think he [Akash] is a very quiet player. He has a very good mentality, and for me, he will be one of the best left-backs in India soon. I think he is a very good left-back." Akash is considered to be one of the best young talents in Indian football.

== Personal life ==
Akash was born on 27 November 2001 in Balrampur in Uttar Pradesh. In an interview with The New Indian Express, he told that he used to play cricket in his early childhood, but left the sport to play football, after seeing his elder cousin brother play the sport.

== Career statistics ==
=== Club ===
As of 24 April 2024

Appearances and goals by club, season and competition
Club	Season	League			National cup		League cup		Continental		Total	
Club	Season	Division	Apps	Goals	Apps	Goals	Apps	Goals	Apps	Goals	Apps	Goals
Indian Arrows	2018–19	I-League	7	0	0	0	—		—		7	0
Indian Arrows	2019–20	I-League	16	0	0	0	—		—		16	0
Indian Arrows	Total		23	0	0	0	0	0	0	0	23	0
Hyderabad	2020–21	Indian Super League	20	0	0	0	—		—		20	0
Hyderabad	2021–22	Indian Super League	23	2	0	0	—		—		23	2
Hyderabad	2022–23	Indian Super League	19	0	2 (Note: Appearance(s) in Super Cup)	0	4 (Note: Appearance(s) in Durand Cup)	1	1 (Note: Appearance(s) in play-offs for AFC Cup)	0	26	1
Hyderabad	Total		62	2	2	0	4	1	1	0	69	3
Mumbai City	2023–24	Indian Super League	20	1	—		2	0	6 (Note: Appearance(s) in AFC Champions League)	0	28	1
Career total			105	3	2	0	6	1	7	0	120	4

=== International ===
As of 6 October 2026

National team	Year	Apps	Goals
India	2021	4	0
India	2022	7	0
India	2023	13	0
India	2024	4	0
India	2025	1	0
India	2026	8	1
Total		37	1

List of international goals scored by Akash Mishra
No.	Date	Venue	Opponent	Score	Result	Competition
1	31 March 2026	Jawaharlal Nehru Stadium, Kochi, India	Hong Kong	2–0	2–1	2027 AFC Asian Cup qualification

== Honours ==
Hyderabad

- Indian Super League: 2021–22

India

- Tri-Nation Series: 2023
- Intercontinental Cup: 2023
