= Rohit Danu =

Indian footballer (born 2002)

Personal information
- Date of birth: 10 July 2002 (age 24)
- Place of birth: Bageshwar, Uttarakhand, India
- Height: 1.73 m (5 ft 8 in)
- Position: Winger

Team information
- Current team: East Bengal

Youth career
- 2015–2017: AIFF Elite Academy

Senior career*
Years	Team	Apps	(Gls)
2018–2020	Indian Arrows	42	(4)
2020–2023	Hyderabad	48	(6)
2023–2025	Bengaluru	26	(2)
2025–2026	Inter Kashi	24	(4)
2026–	East Bengal	9	(2)

International career^{‡}
2017–2018	India U16	22	(8)
2018–2019	India U17	2	(0)
2019–2022	India U20	8	(2)
2019–2023	India U23	6	(0)
- * Club domestic league appearances and goals as of 10:11, 21 May 2026 (UTC) ‡ National team caps and goals as of 22:33, 24 September 2023 (UTC)

Rohit Danu (Hindi: रोहित दानू; born 10 July 2002) is an Indian professional footballer who plays as a forward for Indian Super League club East Bengal.

== Club career ==
=== Early career ===
Danu joined the AIFF Elite Academy in 2015 under Bibiano Fernandes, where he was picked to represent India in various youth levels. At the age of 15, he would have been the youngest player of India national U17 team which played 2017 FIFA U-17 World Cup. Danu, the youngest member in the Indian camp, joined the team after the Portuguese manager Luís Norton de Matos became impressed with his dribbling ability and maturity at such a young age. However, Danu suffered an ankle injury after joining the squad and the manager decided against naming him in the final 21-man squad.

Due to injury, Danu was not even registered for the 2018 AFC U-16 Championship qualifiers. But later, after India qualifying to 2018 AFC U-16 Championship, he was part of the u16 team, playing friendlies in exposure trips. However, Danu could not make it to final squad of 2018 AFC U-16 Championship because the rule says that to play 2018 AFC U-16 Championship, a player must be born after 1 January 2002 and registered in the qualifiers. If not registered for qualifiers, the player must born after 1 September 2002. Unfortunately birth date of Rohit Danu is 10 July 2002. Since he was not registered in the qualifiers due to injury, he was not eligible for the 2018 AFC U-16 Championship.

=== Indian Arrows ===
On 5 January 2019, at the age of 16 years, 5 months and 27 days, Rohit Danu has beaten his fellow team-mate Jitendra Singh's record of being the youngest ever goal scorer in the I-League and Indian top flight overall . The 16-year-old scored in the 14th minute against Aizawl FC at the Rajiv Gandhi Stadium.

=== Hyderabad ===
On 16 October 2020, Danu joined Indian Super League club Hyderabad on a three-year deal, making it his first ever professional contract with a top-tier club. On 15 December 2020, he made his ISL debut for Hyderabad against East Bengal. He came on as a 77th-minute substitute for the Hitesh Sharma as Hyderabad won the match for 3–2. On 27 November 2021, Danu scored his first ever ISL goal in a 3–1 victory against Mumbai City.

=== Bengaluru ===
On 7 July 2023, Bengaluru FC announced the signing of Danu on a 3-year deal. On 31 January 2026, Bengaluru announced Danu had left the club.

=== Inter Kashi ===
After his departure from Bengaluru, it was announced on 2 January 2026 that newly promoted ISL club Inter Kashi had signed Danu.

== Career statistics ==
=== Club ===
As of 2 November 2024

Club	Season	League			Cup		AFC		Total	
Club	Season	Division	Apps	Goals	Apps	Goals	Apps	Goals	Apps	Goals
Indian Arrows	2018–19	I-League	14	4	1 (Note: Appearance(s) in Super Cup)	0	–		15	4
Indian Arrows	2019–20	I-League	7	0	0	0	–		7	0
Indian Arrows	Total		21	4	1	0	0	0	22	4
Hyderabad	2020–21	Indian Super League	5	0	0	0	–		5	0
Hyderabad	2021–22	Indian Super League	17	2	0	0	–		17	2
Hyderabad	2022–23	Indian Super League	13	0	3	0	1 (Note: Appearance(s) in Qualifier for AFC Cup qualifying play-off)	0	17	0
Hyderabad	Total		35	2	3	0	1	0	39	2
Bengaluru	2023–24	Indian Super League	9	0	2	0	–		11	0
Bengaluru	2024–25	Indian Super League	5	0	0	0	–		5	0
Bengaluru	Total		14	0	2	0	0	0	16	0
Inter Kashi	2025–26	Indian Super League	6	1	0	0	–		0	0
Career total			76	7	6	0	1	0	77	6

=== International ===
As of match played 8 June 2019

National team	Year	Apps	Goals
India U16	2018	-	-
India U19	2019	5	1
Total		5	1

== Honours ==
Hyderabad

- Indian Super League: 2021–22
