= Nim Dorjee Tamang =

Indian footballer

Personal information
- Full name: Nim Dorjee Tamang
- Date of birth: 30 October 1995 (age 31)
- Place of birth: Melli, Sikkim, India
- Height: 1.78 m (5 ft 10 in)
- Positions: Centre-back; right-back

Team information
- Current team: Goa
- Number: 30

Youth career
- 2009–2010: Indian Air Force
- 2010–2014: Shillong Lajong

Senior career*
Years	Team	Apps	(Gls)
2014–2017	Shillong Lajong	45	(1)
2017–2019	Pune City	6	(0)
2019–2021	NorthEast United	12	(0)
2021–2024	Hyderabad	28	(1)
2024–	Goa	0	(0)

International career
2013	India U19	2	(0)
- * Club domestic league appearances and goals as of 18:54, 21 December 2023 (UTC)

Nim Dorjee Tamang (born 30 October 1995) is an Indian professional footballer who plays as a defender for Indian Super League club Goa.

== Club career ==
Born in Melli, Sikkim, Tamang started playing football with the Namchi Sports Hostel before joining the Air Force Academy from 2009 to 2010. After making appearances with the India under-16 side, Tamang joined Shillong Lajong's youth team.

Tamang was given a place in Shillong Lajong's first-team squad for the 2014–15 season. He made his professional debut in the Federation Cup against Pune on 29 December 2014. He started the match as Shillong Lajong were defeated 1–3. A month later, on 18 January 2015, Tamang made his competitive league debut in the I-League against Royal Wahingdoh. He started the match but couldn't prevent Shillong Lajong from losing 1–2.

On 12 April 2015, Tamang scored his first competitive goal for Shillong Lajong in a 1–1 draw against Royal Wahingdoh in the I-League.

On 10 July 2015, Tamang was up for selection in the 2015 Indian Super League draft but was ultimately not selected and thus he stayed with Shillong Lajong. Prior to the 2016–17 season, Tamang was named Shillong Lajong captain.

=== Pune City ===
On 23 July 2017, Tamang was selected in the 2017–18 ISL Players Draft in the 6th round by Pune City. He would end up missing the 2017–18 season due to injuries.

Tamang made his return to football on 3 October 2018 in Pune City's opening match against Delhi Dynamos. He started at right-back as Pune City drew the match 1–1.

=== NorthEast United ===
On 2 August 2019, Tamang joined fellow Indian Super League side NorthEast United. He made his debut for the club on 27 November 2019 against Mumbai City. He started at center-back as NorthEast United drew the match 2–2.

=== Hyderabad ===
On 30 July 2021, Tamang joined Hyderabad on a three-year deal.

== International career ==
Tamang has played for India at both the under-17 and under-20 levels. He also played for India's under-19 during the 2014 AFC U-19 Championship qualifiers.

== Career statistics ==
=== Club ===
As of 14 January 2024

Club	Season	League			League Cup		National Cup		AFC		Total	
Club	Season	Division	Apps	Goals	Apps	Goals	Apps	Goals	Apps	Goals	Apps	Goals
Shillong Lajong	2014–15	I-League	18	1	—		—		—		18	1
Shillong Lajong	2015–16	I-League	9	0	—		—		—		9	0
Shillong Lajong	2016–17	I-League	18	0	1 (Note: Appearance(s) in Federation Cup)	0	—		—		19	0
Shillong Lajong	Total		45	1	1	0	0	0	—		46	1
Pune City	2017–18	Indian Super League	0	0	—		—		—		0	0
Pune City	2018–19	Indian Super League	6	0	—		—		—		6	0
Pune City	Total		6	0	0	0	0	0	—		6	0
NorthEast United	2019–20	Indian Super League	5	0	—		—		—		5	0
NorthEast United	2020–21	Indian Super League	7	0	—		—		—		7	0
NorthEast United	Total		12	0	0	0	0	0	—		12	0
Hyderabad	2021–22	Indian Super League	9	0	—		—		—		9	0
Hyderabad	2022–23	Indian Super League	11	1	—		4 (Note: Appearance(s) in Durand Cup)	0	1 (Note: Appearance in Indian club qualifiers for 2023–24 AFC competitions)	0	16	1
Hyderabad	2023–24	Indian Super League	8	0	2 (Note: Appearance(s) in Super Cup)	1	3	0	—		13	1
Hyderabad	Total		28	1	2	1	7	0	1	0	38	2
Career total			91	2	3	1	7	0	1	0	102	3
