= Gurmeet Singh Chahal =

Indian footballer (born 1999)

Gurmeet Singh
Personal information
- Full name: Gurmeet Singh Chahal
- Date of birth: 3 December 1999 (age 26)
- Place of birth: Narwana, Haryana, India
- Height: 1.86 m (6 ft 1 in)
- Position: Goalkeeper

Team information
- Current team: NorthEast United
- Number: 24

Youth career
- NorthEast United

Senior career*
Years	Team	Apps	(Gls)
2018–2021	NorthEast United	9	(0)
2021–2024	Hyderabad	28	(0)
2024–	NorthEast United	28	(0)

International career
2023	India U23	1	(0)
Medal record
Representing India
SAFF Championship
Winner	2023 India
- * Club domestic league appearances and goals as of 21:58, 9 April 2025 (UTC)

Gurmeet Singh Chahal (born 3 December 1999) is an Indian professional footballer who plays as a goalkeeper for Indian Super League club NorthEast United.

== Club career ==
=== NorthEast United FC ===
Singh made his professional debut for Indian Super League side NorthEast United on 1 March 2019 against Kerala Blasters on the last matchday. He came on as a 71st-minute substitute for injured Pawan Kumar as NorthEast United drew the match 0–0. He made his first start in a 2–1 loss against Chennaiyin FC in quarterfinals of Super Cup.

On 11 June 2019, he extended his contract for another season. But he made no appearance in the season. In 2020–21 ISL, he made his first appearance coming as a half time substitute for injured Subhasish Roy Chowdhury in a 1–1 draw against FC Goa conceding no goal during his time in goal. He got a run of gametime due to Chowdhury's injury and started in seven games keeping two cleansheets and returned to bench upon Chowdhury's return.

=== Hyderabad FC ===
On 30 July 2021, Singh joined Hyderabad on a three-year deal. He made his debut and only appearance of the season in a 3–0 loss to Jamshedpur FC where he started the game.

He was on the bench in the 2022 Indian Super League final where Hyderabad defeated Kerala Blasters 3–1 on penalties. This was young Gurmeet and Hyderabad's first ever major trophy.

The following season, he missed the Durand Cup and opening seven games of the league due to an injury but became the first choice keeper upon his return due to Laxmikant Kattimani's knee injury which ruled the latter out for rest of the season. He started his first game of the season in a 1–0 loss to Mohun Bagan.

In the league stage, he kept five cleansheets and conceded only nine goals in twelve games with Hyderabad finishing second in the league. In the semi-finals, both legs against Mohun Bagan ended in goalless draws with Hyderabad losing 4–3 on penalties. On 17 April, he received his first professional career red card in the final seconds of the last group stage game of Super Cup against Odisha FC where he tried to deny Diego Mauricio a clear goal opportunity in a 2–1 loss.

=== Return to NorthEast United ===
In March 2024, due to Hyderabad failing to pay his salary for multiple months, was given permission to terminate his Hyderabad contract. After getting clearance for his termination, he re-joined NorthEast United on a 4.5-year-deal, valid until the end of the 2027–28 season. Gurmeet made his second debut for NorthEast on 7 March 2024, starting in a 1–0 loss to Punjab FC.

== International career ==
In May 2023, he received his maiden national call up ahead of 2023 Intercontinental Cup and 2023 SAFF Championship after injuries to Vishal Kaith and Phurba Lachenpa.

He remained as the third choice behind Gurpreet Singh Sandhu and Amrinder Singh and was on the bench in all the matches as India went to win both the tournaments. He was selected for 2022 Asian Games. He made his India U23 debut in the first match against China U23 which ended in a 5–1 loss.

Despite the loss he was praised for his performance as he managed to save a penalty from Zhu Chenjie.

== Career statistics ==
=== Club ===
As of 7 March 2024

Club	Season	League			Cup		Continental		Total	
Club	Season	Division	Apps	Goals	Apps	Goals	Apps	Goals	Apps	Goals
NorthEast United	2018–19	Indian Super League	1	0	1 (Note: Appearance(s) in Super Cup)	0	—		2	0
NorthEast United	2019–20	Indian Super League	0	0	0	0	—		0	0
NorthEast United	2020–21	Indian Super League	8	0	0	0	—		8	0
NorthEast United	Total		9	0	1	0	0	0	10	0
Hyderabad	2021–22	Indian Super League	1	0	0	0	—		1	0
Hyderabad	2022–23	Indian Super League	14	0	2	0	—		16	0
Hyderabad	2023–24	Indian Super League	13	0	2 (Note: Appearance(s) in Durand Cup)	0	—		15	0
Hyderabad	Total		28	0	4	0	0	0	32	0
NorthEast United	2023–24	Indian Super League	1	0	0	0	—		1	0
Career total			38	0	5	0	0	0	43	0

== Honours ==
Hyderabad

- Indian Super League: 2021–22

NorthEast United

- Durand Cup: 2024, 2025

India

- SAFF Championship: 2023
- Intercontinental Cup: 2023

Individual

- Durand Cup Golden Glove: 2024, 2025
