= Aziznagar =

Coordinates: 28°57′N 79°08′E

Aziznagar Aziz Nagar
- Village
- Interactive map of Aziznagar
- Country: India
- State: Telangana
- District: Ranga Reddy
- City: Hyderabad

Government
  - Type: Gram Panchayat
  - Body: Telangana Rashtra Samithi

Languages
  - Official: Telugu
- Time zone: UTC+5:30 (IST)
- Vehicle registration: TS07
- Planning agency: Panchayat
- Civic agency: Mandal Office
- Website: telangana.gov.in

Aziznagar is a village in the Moinabad mandal, Ranga Reddy District, Hyderabad, Telangana, India. It is approximately 6.8 km from the Mandal Main Town Moinabad. This village is considered as an urban village as it west side of the city Hyderabad and is a highly developing area which has several universities/colleges like Vidya Jyothi Institute of Technology.
