= Dimple Bhagat =

Indian footballer (born 1998)

Personal information
- Date of birth: 12 December 1998 (age 27)
- Place of birth: Jammu and Kashmir, India
- Position: Left back

Team information
- Current team: TRAU

Youth career
- 2014–2018: Pune City

Senior career*
Years	Team	Apps	(Gls)
2018–2020	Gokulam Kerala	4	(0)
2020–2022	Hyderabad	2	(0)
2023	Downtown Heroes	0	(0)
2023–	TRAU	0	(0)
- * Club domestic league appearances and goals as of 16:04, 16 May 2020 (UTC)

Dimple Bhagat (born 12 December 1998) is an Indian professional footballer who plays as a defender for I-League club TRAU.

== Club career ==
Born in Jammu and Kashmir, Bhagat began his career in the Pune academy before the academy was bought by Indian Super League side Pune City.

In 2018, Dimple left the Pune City academy to join I-League side Gokulam Kerala. He made his professional debut on 15 December 2018 in the league against Real Kashmir. He started and played the full match as Gokulam Kerala drew 1–1. He played three more matches for Gokulam Kerala before leaving the club.

In January 2020, Bhagat signed with Indian Super League side Hyderabad. He made his debut for the club on 15 January 2020 in the league against Odisha. He started the match but was sent off 2 minutes into first-half stoppage time, which earned Odisha a penalty which they converted and soon won the match 2–1.

== Career statistics ==
=== Club ===
As of 30 January 2020

Club	Season	League			Cup		Continental		Total	
Club	Season	Division	Apps	Goals	Apps	Goals	Apps	Goals	Apps	Goals
Gokulam Kerala	2018–19	I-League	4	0	0	0	—		4	0
Hyderabad	2019–20	Indian Super League	2	0	0	0	—		2	0
Hyderabad	2020–21	Indian Super League	0	0	0	0	—		0	0
Hyderabad	2021–22	Indian Super League	0	0	0	0	—		0	0
Hyderabad	Hyderabad total		2	0	0	0	0	0	2	0
TRAU	2023–24	I-League	0	0	0	0	—		0	0
Career total			6	0	0	0	0	0	6	0
