= Vidya Jyothi Institute of Technology =

Institute in Hyderabad, India

Coordinates: 17°20′43″N 78°19′25″E

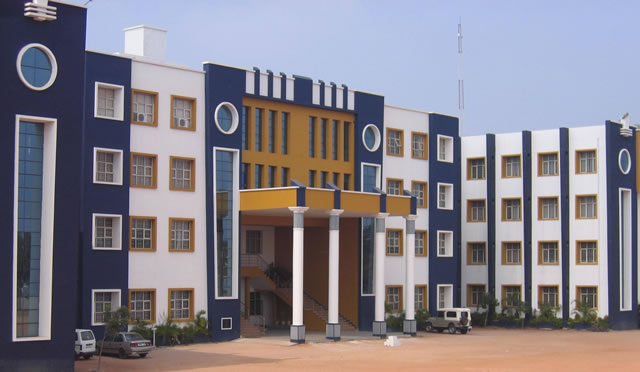
- Main Building
- Motto: Education through Freedom
- Type: Education Institution
- Established: 1999
- Location: Hyderabad, Telangana, India
- Website: vjit.ac.in

Vidya Jyothi Institute of Technology (VJIT) is a college in Hyderabad, India, established in 1998 by A.P. Jithender Reddy and V. Purushottam Reddy. It is located on the way to Chilkur Balaji Temple from Mrugavani National Park.

Vidya Jyothi Educational Society created by a group of committed academics and enterprising educationists. VJIT quickly won confidence of the parent community and students to become one of the select destinations for future engineers.

== Infrastructure ==
The campus consists of seven blocks. The main block is the newest with three sub-blocks named the Central "C", South "S" and North "N" blocks. The "E" block is exclusively for the first-years. This is to keep them safe from ragging. The institute follows a strict anti-ragging policy and thus shields the freshers from any such incidents.

The South "S-Block" is for the Artificial Intelligence and Information Technology departments and B-Block for Engineering Workshop. The North "N-Block" is for Computer Science Engineering and Electrical and Electronics Engineering departments. The central "C-block" is exclusively for administration. It consists of Seminar halls, Principal's office, Secretary's office and other offices of the college administration.

Vidya Jyothi Institute of technology ranks number six among all the colleges in the Hyderabad city, excluding the Universities.

== Ranking ==
University rankings

Engineering – India
- NIRF (2024): 201-300

Vidya Jyothi Institute of Technology was ranked in the 201-300 band among top engineering institutes in India by National Institutional Ranking Framework (NIRF) in 2024.

== Transport facilities ==
The college has adequate transport facilities connecting it to different locations in the city. The college has buses covering the following destinations, among others:

- Ameerpet
- Dilshukhnagar
- Kukatpally
- Secunderabad
- Uppal
- Sangareddy
- Patancheru
- vikarabad

== Student societies ==
=== Developers Student Society ===
Inaugurated : 06.01.2018

Developer Student Society aims in promoting excellence and competence in the field of Competitive Programming, Web and Open Source Contribution. It is to conduct workshops, Tech Talks, Hackathon and Capture the Flags at Institution.

The student representatives/facilitators for the Developer Student Society from institution are mentored by Open Source contributors globally and Google trainers via programs :- AppliedCSwithAndroid, Developer Student Club, Google Developers Group, Women Techmakers. Also to participate in Codejam, Google Summer of Code (remote summer internship), APAC.

=== Artificial Intelligence & Machine Learning Club ===
Inaugurated : 06.10.2018

AIML CLUB Club is the platform created to nurture AI, ML, DL related learning, activities and publications among CSE/IT students’ community of VJIT.

=== LeadingIndia@VJIT ===
It is a Research group in collaboration with leadingIndia.ai initiative by AICTE, Bennett University – Noida, City College London. This group has taken initiative to establish and conduct Artificial Intelligence; Machine Learning & Deep Learning based Research Activities, Student Club, Paper Publications, Blogs, and Workshops etc. The focus will be on development and strengthening systems thinking, problem solving, Analysis, Design, Research, and Develop computer systems and their applications and to provide Machine Learning practitioners and researchers with the infrastructure and tools to accelerate Deep Learning.

== Events ==
The college has hosted/is hosting following events:

=== Technical events ===
- Prometheus-2018 (CSE & IT ) Treasure Hunt Augmented Reality Game by Y.M Rohit
- Prometheus-2017
- Vidya (Technical symposium)
- Cyberveda2k8 (Technical fest). The convener is Sainath Gupta.
- Cyrix (Technical fest). The convener is Sagar Patke.
- Verve '11 (Technical fest). The convener is B. Srinivasulu Reddy supported by student coordinators Dinesh Kumar (EEE Dept.), Tushar (ECE Dept.), Pranav Phalgun (CSE Dept.), Madhusudhan (Mech Dept.), and Phalaksh (IT Dept.).
- Phoenix'12(Technical cum Cultural fest). The Convener is R.K.Singh Supported by Chief Student Coordinator Dinesh Kumar of EEE Dept.

=== Cultural events ===
- Phoenix (college annual day and cultural fest) on 03-04 March

== Voluntary activities ==
The students take part in voluntary activities.

=== VRN (We Are Neurons) ===
This is a student driven organization and platform for the students from all undergraduate disciplines coming together out of a common interest of being better in terms of having practical knowledge and how to improve their better interpersonal skills and cultural manoeuvre.

=== Avashah ===
Hands That Help is the brainchild of VJIT students. It involves voluntary activities like teaching to the poor in the government schools, charity works and other activities to develop the underprivileged.

=== Street Readers ===
Society for students was started by students of VJIT in 2007 to help in building careers of students. Now this organisation is widely spread across 89 colleges in Hyderabad.
