= Kynsailang Khongsit =

Indian footballer

Personal information
- Full name: Kynsailang Khongsit
- Date of birth: 11 December 2000 (age 25)
- Place of birth: Shillong, Meghalaya, India
- Position: Right back

Team information
- Current team: Rajasthan United
- Number: 6

Youth career
- –2017: Royal Wahingdoh

Senior career*
Years	Team	Apps	(Gls)
2017–2020	Shillong Lajong	22	(0)
2020	Hyderabad B	6	(1)
2020–2021	Hyderabad		
2021–2022	Bengaluru United	3	(0)
2022–2023	Mumbai Kenkre	34	(1)
2023–2025	Shillong Lajong	44	(0)
2025–	Rajasthan United	1	(0)
- * Club domestic league appearances and goals ‡ National team caps and goals as of 23:34, 1 March 2026 (UTC)

Kynsailang Khongsit (born 11 December 2000) is an Indian professional footballer who plays as a defender for Indian Football League club Rajasthan United.

== Career ==
Born in Shillong, Meghalaya, Khongsit was part of the youth side of Royal Wahingdoh before moving to I-League club Shillong Lajong in the summer of 2017. While with Wahingdoh, Khongsit was part of their squad for the I-League U18 and was sent abroad to Spain for training.

=== Shillong Lajong ===
On 6 August 2017, he was announced as part of the Shillong Lajong senior side for the Shillong Premier League. A few months later, Khongsit was also included in the first-team squad for the 2017–18 I-League. He soon made his professional debut, at the age of 16, in the club's opening match of the season against Gokulam Kerala. He started the match at left back and played 73 minutes as Shillong Lajong won 1–0.

=== Hyderabad FC ===
On 26 January 2020, Khongsit joined Indian Super League club Hyderabad FC.

== Career statistics ==
As of 7 February 2018

Club	Season	League			Cup		Continental		Total	
Club	Season	Division	Apps	Goals	Apps	Goals	Apps	Goals	Apps	Goals
Shillong Lajong	2017–18	I-League	10	0	0	0	—	—	10	0
Shillong Lajong	2018–19	I-League	12	0	0	0	—	—	12	0
Career total			22	0	0	0	0	0	22	0
