= Odei Onaindia =

Spanish footballer (born 1989)

Personal information
- Full name: Odei Onaindia Zabala
- Date of birth: 7 December 1989 (age 36)
- Place of birth: Lekeitio, Spain
- Height: 1.80 m (5 ft 11 in)
- Position: Centre-back

Team information
- Current team: Amorebieta
- Number: 5

Youth career
- Lekeitio FT
- 2007–2008: Athletic Bilbao

Senior career*
Years	Team	Apps	(Gls)
2008–2010	Basconia	31	(0)
2008–2009	→ Elgoibar (loan)	33	(3)
2010–2011	Durango	34	(2)
2011–2013	Amorebieta	69	(0)
2013–2015	Barakaldo	71	(0)
2015–2016	Burgos	31	(0)
2016	Marbella	0	(0)
2016–2017	Bilbao Athletic	6	(0)
2017	Burgos	19	(2)
2017–2018	Melilla	37	(1)
2018–2020	Mirandés	62	(1)
2020–2021	Hyderabad	20	(0)
2021–2022	Mirandés	27	(0)
2022–2023	Hyderabad	21	(1)
2023–2025	Goa	49	(1)
2025–	Amorebieta	33	(0)
- * Club domestic league appearances and goals as of 14 May 2026

Odei Onaindia Zabala (born 7 December 1989) is a Spanish professional footballer who plays as a defender for Segunda Federación club Amorebieta.

== Club career ==
Born in Lekeitio, Biscay, Basque Country, Odei joined Athletic Bilbao's Lezama in 2007, from hometown side Lekeitio FT. He made his senior debut in the 2008–09 campaign, while on loan at Tercera División side CD Elgoibar; upon returning, he was assigned to Athletic's farm team in the same category.

Odei first arrived in Segunda División B in July 2011, joining SD Amorebieta. He continued to appear in the division in the following years, representing Barakaldo CF, Burgos CF (two stints), Marbella FC (where he only spent 20 days with the squad before being released), Bilbao Athletic, UD Melilla and CD Mirandés; with the latter, he achieved promotion to Segunda División in 2019.

On 9 July 2019, Odei renewed his contract with the Rojillos for a further season. He made his professional debut at the age of 29 on 8 September, starting in a 2–1 home win against Real Oviedo.

Odei scored his first professional goal on 15 January 2020, netting a last-minute equalizer in a 3–3 draw at Cádiz CF. On 19 September, he moved abroad for the first time in his career, after agreeing to a one-year deal with Indian Super League club Hyderabad FC.

On 7 July 2021, Odei rejoined his former club Mirandés on a one-year contract.

In July 2022, Odei returned to India and defending Indian Super League champions Hyderabad, on a one-year deal.

== Career statistics ==
=== Club ===
As of 3 May 2025

Club	Season	League			Cup		Continental		Total	
Club	Season	Division	Apps	Goals	Apps	Goals	Apps	Goals	Apps	Goals
Amorebieta	2011–12	Segunda División B	36	0	1 (Note: Appearance(s) in Copa del Rey)	0	—		37	0
Amorebieta	2012–13	Segunda División B	33	0	1	0	—		34	0
Amorebieta	Total		69	0	2	0	0	0	71	0
Barakaldo	2013–14	Segunda División B	34	0	1	0	—		35	0
Barakaldo	2014–15	Segunda División B	37	0	2	0	—		39	0
Barakaldo	Total		71	0	3	0	0	0	74	0
Burgos	2015–16	Segunda División B	31	0	0	0	—		31	0
Bilbao Athletic	2016–17	Segunda División B	6	0	0	0	—		6	0
Burgos	2016–17	Segunda División B	19	2	0	0	—		19	2
Melilla	2017–18	Segunda División B	37	1	1	0	—		38	1
Mirandés	2018–19	Segunda División B	31	0	1	0	—		32	0
Mirandés	2019–20	Segunda División	31	1	6	1	—		37	2
Mirandés	Total		62	1	7	1	0	0	69	2
Hyderabad	2020–21	Indian Super League	20	0	0	0	—		20	0
Mirandés	2021–22	Segunda División	27	0	0	0	—		27	0
Hyderabad	2022–23	Indian Super League	21	1	8 (Note: Appearance(s) in Durand Cup) (Note: Appearance(s) in Super Cup)	0	1 (Note: Appearance(s) in qualifier for AFC Cup qualifying play-off)	0	30	1
Goa	2023–24	Indian Super League	24	1	8	0	—		32	1
Goa	2024–25	Indian Super League	25	0	4	0	—		29	0
Goa	Total		49	1	12	0	0	0	61	1
Amorebieta	2025–26	Segunda Federación	0	0	0	0	—		0	0
Career total			412	6	33	1	1	0	446	7
