= Lalawmpuia Ralte =

Indian footballer

Lalawmpuia
Personal information
- Full name: Lalawmpuia Ralte
- Date of birth: 24 October 1999 (age 27)
- Place of birth: Aizawl, Mizoram, India
- Height: 1.65 m (5 ft 5 in)
- Position: Forward

Team information
- Current team: Sudeva Delhi (on loan from Hyderabad)

Youth career
- 2016: DSK Shivajians
- 2017: Goa Reserves

Senior career*
Years	Team	Apps	(Gls)
2019–20	Goa	0	(0)
2020–	Hyderabad	2	(0)
2021–	→ Sudeva Delhi (loan)	2	(0)

International career
2017	India U20	4	(3)
- * Club domestic league appearances and goals as of 14:11, 12 December 2020 (UTC)

Lalawmpuia Ralte (born 24 October 1999) is an Indian professional footballer who plays as a forward for I-League club Sudeva Delhi, on loan from Hyderabad.

== Career ==
Born in Mizoram, Lalawmpuia joined Hyderabad on a three-year deal from Goa. On 11 December 2020, Lalawmpuia made his professional debut for Indian Super League side Hyderabad FC against ATK Mohun Bagan.He came on as a 76th-minute substitute for the Souvik Chakrabarti as Hyderabad FC drew the match 1–1.

On 28 July 2021, Lalawmpuia joined Sudeva Delhi on a season-long loan.

== Career statistics ==
=== Club ===
As of match played 11 December 2020

Appearances and goals by club, season and competition
Club	Season	League			Cup		Continental		Other		Total	
Club	Season	Division	Apps	Goals	Apps	Goals	Apps	Goals	Apps	Goals	Apps	Goals
Goa	2017–18		9	3	2	0	—				11	3
Goa	2018–19		6	1			—				6	1
Goa	2019–20		4	2			—				4	2
Hyderabad	2020–21	Indian Super League	2	0	0	0	—				2	0
Sudeva Delhi (loan)	2020–21	I-League	0	0	2	0	—				2	0
	2021–22	I-League	2	0	0	0					2	0
Career total			23	6	4	0	0	0			29	6
