= Hitesh Sharma (footballer) =

Indian footballer

Personal information
- Date of birth: 25 December 1997 (age 28)
- Place of birth: Jalandhar, India
- Height: 1.74 m (5 ft 9 in)
- Position: Midfielder

Team information
- Current team: Inter Kashi
- Number: 18

Youth career
- Chandigarh Football Academy
- Tata Football Academy
- Mumbai FC U19

Senior career*
Years	Team	Apps	(Gls)
2016–2017	Mumbai	12	(0)
2017–2020	ATK	27	(0)
2020–2024	Hyderabad	50	(2)
2024–2026	Odisha	12	(0)
2024–2025	→ Mumbai City (loan)	2	(0)
2026–	Inter Kashi	2	(0)

International career^{‡}
2018–	India	3	(0)
Medal record
Representing India
SAFF Championship
Winner	2018 Bangladesh
- * Club domestic league appearances and goals as of 17 October 2026 ‡ National team caps and goals as of 29 March 2021

Hitesh Sharma (born 25 December 1997) is an Indian professional footballer who plays as a midfielder for Indian Super League club Inter Kashi.

== Career ==
Sharma spent the majority of his youth career as part of the Tata Football Academy. In 2015, Sharma graduated from the academy and signed with Mumbai of the I-League. He appeared on the bench for the club in their opening match of the season against Shillong Lajong. He did not come off the bench however.

Sharma eventually made his professional debut for the club on 5 March 2016 against Salgaocar.

On 19 July 2024, Hitesh signed for Mumbai City FC on a one-year loan deal from Odisha FC. He made his debut on 30 December 2024 at home in a 3–0 loss against NorthEast United FC, coming on as an 88th-minute substitute for Brandon Fernandes.

== Career statistics ==
=== Club ===
As of 30 April 2025

Club	Season	League			Cup		AFC		Total	
Club	Season	Division	Apps	Goals	Apps	Goals	Apps	Goals	Apps	Goals
Mumbai	2015–16	I-League	4	0	0	0	—		4	0
Mumbai	2016–17	I-League	8	0	0	0	—		8	0
Mumbai	Total		12	0	0	0	0	0	12	0
ATK	2017–18	Indian Super League	14	0	2 (Note: Appearance(s) in Super Cup)	1	—		16	1
ATK	2018–19	Indian Super League	13	0	5 (Note: Appearance(s) in Durand Cup)	0	—		18	0
ATK	Total		27	0	7	1	0	0	34	1
Hyderabad	2019–20	Indian Super League	0	0	0	0	—		0	0
Hyderabad	2020–21	Indian Super League	15	0	0	0	—		15	0
Hyderabad	2021–22	Indian Super League	10	0	0	0	—		10	0
Hyderabad	2022–23	Indian Super League	19	1	4	0	—		23	1
Hyderabad	2023–24	Indian Super League	6	1	5	0	—		11	1
Hyderabad	Total		50	2	9	0	0	0	59	2
Odisha	2023–24	Indian Super League	4	0	0	0	—		4	0
Mumbai City (loan)	2024–25	Indian Super League	2	0	3	0	—		5	0
Career total			95	2	19	1	0	0	114	3

=== International ===
As of matches played till 29 March 2021

National team	Year	Apps	Goals
India	2018	2	0
India	2021	1	0
Total		3	0

== Honours ==
India

- SAFF Championship runner-up: 2018

== Achievements ==
ISL Awards
Year	For	Against	Match Result	Award
2017-18	ATK	Kerala	0-0	Emerging Player of the Match
2017-18	ATK	Delhi	1-0	Emerging Player of the Match
2018-19	ATK	Chennai	3-2	Emerging Player of the Match
2018-19	ATK	Jamshedpur	2-1	Emerging Player of the Match
2020-21	Hyderabad	Mumbai	0-0	Hero of the Match
