= Indian club qualifiers for 2023–24 AFC competitions =

Indian qualifiers for the 2023–24 AFC competitions

Indian Club qualifiers for 2023-24 AFC competitions officially known as the Hero Club Playoffs (for sponsorship reasons with Hero motocorp) was a series of extra playoff matches conducted to determine the slots of Indian clubs in 2023-24 AFC club competitions.

Since the 2023–24 AFC Champions League and the 2023–24 AFC Cup adopted transitional calendar with the switch from Spring-to-Autumn to an Autumn-to-Spring schedule, the All India Football Federation decided that its continental slots would be determined by extra playoff matches.

== Playoff for the AFC Champions League group stage ==
Team	Qualification	Score
Jamshedpur	2021–22 Indian Super League League Shield winners	1
Mumbai City	2022–23 Indian Super League League Shield winners	3

The winner qualified for the AFC Champions League group stage.

4 April 2023
20.30 IST

Jamshedpur	1–3	Mumbai City
Sabiá 80'	Report	Jahouh 53' (pen.); Noguera 70'; Vikram 90+4'

Payyanad Stadium, Manjeri, Kerala
Attendance: 4,423
Referee: Venkatesh Ramachadran

== Playoff for the AFC Cup group stage ==
Team	Qualification	Score
Gokulam Kerala	2021–22 I-League champions	1
Odisha	2023 Super Cup champions	3

The winner qualified for the AFC Cup group stage.

29 April 2023
19.00 IST

Gokulam Kerala	1–3	Odisha
Noor 36'	Report	Maurício 18', 32', 53' (pen.)

EMS Stadium, Kozhikode, Kerala
Attendance: 500
Referee: Tejas Visvasrao Nagvenkar

== Playoff for the AFC Cup qualifying play-off ==
Team	Qualification	Score
Hyderabad	2022 Indian Super League playoffs winners	1 (1)
ATK Mohun Bagan	2023 Indian Super League playoffs winners	1 (3)(p)

The winner qualified for the AFC Cup qualifying play-off.

3 May 2023
19.00 IST

Hyderabad	1–1 (a.e.t.)	ATK Mohun Bagan
Chianese 44'	Report	Petratos 20'
Penalties
Victor (penalty scored); Tavora (penalty missed); Chianese (penalty missed); Onaindia (penalty missed)	1–3	(penalty scored) Petratos; (penalty missed) McHugh; (penalty scored) Colaco; (penalty scored) Nassiri

EMS Stadium, Kozhikode, Kerala
Attendance: 750
Referee: Venkatesh R
