= List of 2021–22 Indian Super League transfers =

2021–22 Indian Super League transfers
- Season: 2021–22 Indian Super League

The following is a list of transfers for the 2021–22 Indian Super League. The list includes both pre-season and mid-season transfers.

== Transfers ==
All clubs without a flag are participating in the Indian Super League.

Date	Name	Moving from	Moving to	Ref.
3 March 2021	(Norway) Kristian Opseth	Bengaluru	(Norway) Sarpsborg 08	
5 March 2021	(England) Steven Taylor	Odisha	(New Zealand) Wellington Phoenix	
10 March 2021	(Gabon) Yrondu Musavu-King	Free agent	Bengaluru	
11 March 2021	(Slovenia) Jakub Sylvestr	Chennaiyin	(Lithuania) Žalgiris	
12 March 2021	(Australia) Brad Inman	ATK Mohun Bagan	(Australia) Western United (loan)	
18 March 2021	(India) Sanjeev Stalin	(Portugal) Sertanense	Kerala Blasters	
20 March 2021	(Tajikistan) Fatkhullo Fatkhuloev	Chennaiyin	(Tajikistan) Pamir Dushanbe	
26 March 2021	(Spain) Juande	Kerala Blasters	(Australia) Adelaide United	
8 April 2021	(India) Ruivah Hormipam	(India) RoundGlass Punjab	Kerala Blasters	
9 April 2021	(India) Damait Lyngdoh	(India) Bengaluru Reserves	Bengaluru	
8 April 2021	(India) Sivasakthi Narayanan	(India) Bengaluru Reserves	Bengaluru	
8 April 2021	(India) Akashdeep Singh	(India) Bengaluru Reserves	Bengaluru	
8 April 2021	(India) Muhammed Inayath	(India) Bengaluru Reserves	Bengaluru	
10 April 2021	(India) Liston Colaco	Hyderabad	ATK Mohun Bagan	
12 April 2021	(Australia) Joel Chianese	Hyderabad	(Australia) Perth Glory (loan)	
23 April 2021	(Brazil) Marcelinho	Odisha	(Brazil) EC Taubate	
14 May 2021	(India) Sahil Panwar	Hyderabad	Odisha	
31 May 2021	(India) Amrinder Singh	Mumbai City	ATK Mohun Bagan	
31 May 2021	(India) Kynsailang Khongsit	Hyderabad	(India) Bengaluru United	
1 June 2021	(India) Deependra Negi	Hyderabad	(India) Garhwal	
2 June 2021	(India) Mohammad Nawaz	Goa	Mumbai City	
15 June 2021	(England) Gary Hooper	Kerala Blasters	(New Zealand) Wellington Phoenix	
17 June 2021	(England) Calum Woods	East Bengal	(Wales) Bala Town	
22 June 2021	(India) Abdul Rabeeh	(India) Luca	Hyderabad	
24 June 2021	(Finland) Joni Kauko	(Denmark) Esbjerg	ATK Mohun Bagan	
24 June 2021	(Democratic Republic of the Congo) Jacques Maghoma	East Bengal	(England) Spalding United	
26 June 2021	(India) Lalramchullova	East Bengal	(India) Mohammedan	
28 June 2021	(India) Sagolsem Bikash Singh	East Bengal	(India) TRAU	
29 June 2021	(India) Deepak Tangri	Chennaiyin	ATK Mohun Bagan	
29 June 2021	(Portugal) Luís Machado	NorthEast United	(Poland) Radomiak Radom	
29 June 2021	(India) Rohit Kumar	Kerala Blasters	Bengaluru	
29 June 2021	(India) Narayan Das	East Bengal	Chennaiyin	
5 July 2021	(India) Aryan Niraj Lamba	ATK Mohun Bagan	(India) Kerala United	
6 July 2021	(Brazil) Alan Costa	(Brazil) Avaí	Bengaluru (loan)	
12 July 2021	(India) George D'Souza	Odisha	(India) Bengaluru United	
21 July 2021	(India) Aniket Jadhav	Jamshedpur	Hyderabad	
1 July 2021	(Spain) David Grande	Jamshedpur	(Spain) Calahorra	
2 July 2021	(India) Salam Ranjan Singh	ATK Mohun Bagan	Chennaiyin	
2 July 2021	(Belgium) Benjamin Lambot	NorthEast United	(Belgium) Liège	
3 July 2021	(India) Sweden Fernandes	Hyderabad	(India) NEROCA (loan)	
5 July 2021	(India) Isaac Vanmalsawma	Jamshedpur	Odisha	
5 July 2021	(India) Aryan Niraj Lamba	ATK Mohun Bagan	(India) Kerala United	
6 July 2021	(India) Ashutosh Mehta	NorthEast United	ATK Mohun Bagan	
7 July 2021	(India) Pukhrambam Manisana Singh	Jamshedpur	(India) NEROCA	
7 July 2021	(India) Debjit Majumder	East Bengal	Chennaiyin	
8 July 2021	(France) Hugo Boumous	Mumbai City	ATK Mohun Bagan	
8 July 2021	(Spain) Odei Onaindia	Hyderabad	(Spain) CD Mirandés	
8 July 2021	(India) Vincy Barretto	(India) Gokulam Kerala	Kerala Blasters	
8 July 2021	(India) Lalruatthara	Kerala Blasters	Odisha	
9 July 2021	(Nigeria) Bartholomew Ogbeche	Mumbai City	Hyderabad	
11 July 2021	(India) Anil Gaonkar	(India) Vasco	Kerala Blasters	
12 July 2021	(India) Bidyananda Singh	Mumbai City	ATK Mohun Bagan	
12 July 2021	(Spain) Edu García	ATK Mohun Bagan	Hyderabad	
12 July 2021	(India) Sarthak Golui	East Bengal	Bengaluru	
13 July 2021	(Nigeria) Bright Enobakhare	East Bengal	(England) Coventry City	
13 July 2021	(India) Ricky Shabong	(India) Indian Arrows	ATK Mohun Bagan	
13 July 2021	(Brazil) Diego Maurício	Odisha	(Qatar) Al-Shahania	
14 July 2021	(India) Sebastian Thangmuansang	(India) Gokulam Kerala	Odisha	
15 July 2021	(India) Harmanjot Khabra	Bengaluru	Kerala Blasters	
16 July 2021	(Republic of the Congo) Prince Ibara	(Belgium) K Beerschot VA	Bengaluru	
16 July 2021	(Republic of Ireland) Anthony Pilkington	East Bengal	(England) Fleetwood Town	
16 July 2021	(Germany) Matti Steinmann	East Bengal	(Australia) Brisbane Roar	
18 July 2021	(India) Aaren D'Silva	FC Goa	Hyderabad	
18 July 2021	(India) Harmanpreet Singh	East Bengal	Bengaluru	
20 July 2021	(Spain) Aridane Santana	Hyderabad	(Spain) UD Logroñés	
20 July 2021	(Zimbabwe) Costa Nhamoinesu	Kerala Blasters	(Poland) Podbeskidzie Bielsko-Biała	
21 July 2021	(India) Shahajas Thekkan	(India) Kerala Blasters Reserves	Kerala Blasters	
21 July 2021	(India) Sreekuttan V. S.	(India) Kerala Blasters Reserves	Kerala Blasters	
21 July 2021	(India) Sukham Yoihenba Meitei	(India) Kerala Blasters Reserves	Kerala Blasters	
21 July 2021	(India) Bijoy Varghese	(India) Kerala Blasters Reserves	Kerala Blasters	
21 July 2021	(India) Sachin A Suresh	(India) Kerala Blasters Reserves	Kerala Blasters	
22 July 2021	(Uruguay) Adrián Luna	(Australia) Melbourne City	Kerala Blasters	
22 July 2021	(India) Jayesh Rane	ATK Mohun Bagan	Bengaluru	
23 July 2021	(Wales) Aaron Amadi-Holloway	East Bengal	(England) Burton Albion	
25 July 2021	(India) Jobby Justin	ATK Mohun Bagan	Chennaiyin	
25 July 2021	(Senegal) Diawandou Diagne	Odisha	(Finland) Kotkan Työväen Palloilijat	
26 July 2021	(India) Danish Farooq Bhat	(India) Real Kashmir	Bengaluru	
26 July 2021	(Spain) Victor Mongil	(Georgia (country)) Dinamo Tbilisi	Odisha	
26 July 2021	(Spain) Juanan	Bengaluru	Hyderabad	
28 July 2021	(India) Bidyashagar Singh	(India) TRAU	Bengaluru	
28 July 2021	(India) Lalawmpuia Ralte	Hyderabad	(India) Sudeva Delhi (loan)	
28 July 2021	(Spain) Lluís Sastre	Hyderabad	(Spain) SD Huesca B	
29 July 2021	(India) Milan Singh	East Bengal	(India) Mohammedan	
29 July 2021	(South Africa) Cole Alexander	Odisha	(South Africa) Kaizer Chiefs	
30 July 2021	(Spain) Javi Hernández	ATK Mohun Bagan	Odisha	
30 July 2021	(Spain) Igor Angulo	Goa	Mumbai City	
30 July 2021	(India) Nim Dorjee Tamang	NorthEast United	Hyderabad	
30 July 2021	(India) Gurmeet Singh	NorthEast United	Hyderabad	
31 July 2021	(Bosnia and Herzegovina) Enes Šipović	Chennaiyin	Kerala Blasters	
1 August 2021	(Kyrgyzstan) Mirlan Murzaev	(Kyrgyzstan) Dordoi Bishkek	Chennaiyin	
1 August 2021	(India) Harsha Parui	Jamshedpur	(India) Peerless	
2 August 2021	(India) Wayne Vaz	NorthEast United	(India) Mohammedan	
3 August 2021	(India) Brandon Vanlalremdika	East Bengal	(India) Mohammedan	
4 August 2021	(India) Deepak Devrani	(India) Gokulam Kerala	Chennaiyin	
4 August 2021	(India) Kunal Kundaikar	(India) Sporting Clube de Goa	Goa	
5 August 2021	(Serbia) Slavko Damjanović	(Hungary) TSC Bačka Topola	Chennaiyin	
5 August 2021	(India) Nikhil Raj	(India) Kickstart	Odisha (loan)	
5 August 2021	(Argentina) Facundo Pereyra	Kerala Blasters	(Argentina) Estudiantes	
5 August 2021	(India) Seiminlen Doungel	Goa	Jamshedpur	
6 August 2021	(Australia) Jacob Tratt	Odisha	(Australia) Adelaide United	
7 August 2021	(India) Muhammed Nemil	(Spain) UDA Gramenet U19	Goa	
8 August 2021	(India) Manushawn Fernandes	(India) Youth Club of Manora	Goa	
9 August 2021	(Spain) Manuel Onwu	Odisha	(Spain) Badalona	
10 August 2021	(Poland) Ariel Borysiuk	(Poland) Jagiellonia Białystok	Chennaiyin	
10 August 2021	(India) Rino Anto	East Bengal	(India) RoundGlass Punjab	
11 August 2021	(India) Gurtej Singh	East Bengal	(India) RoundGlass Punjab	
11 August 2021	(India) Raj Mahato	Jamshedpur	(India) Peerless	
12 August 2021	(Spain) Héctor Rodas	(Spain) Cultural Leonesa	Odisha	
13 August 2021	(India) Apuia Lalengmawia	NorthEast United	Mumbai City	
13 August 2021	(Spain) Airam Cabrera	(Poland) Wisła Płock	Goa	
13 August 2021	(India) Davinder Singh	Mumbai City	Chennaiyin	
14 August 2021	(India) Kiyan Nassiri	(India) ATK Mohun Bagan Reserves	ATK Mohun Bagan	
14 August 2021	(India) Abhishek Suryavanshi	(India) ATK Mohun Bagan Reserves	ATK Mohun Bagan	
15 August 2021	(India) Rakesh Pradhan	NorthEast United	(India) Mohammedan	
16 August 2021	(Ghana) Kwesi Appiah	NorthEast United	Crawley Town	
16 August 2021	(Spain) Aridai Cabrera	(Spain) Las Palmas	Odisha	
17 August 2021	(India) Anas Edathodika	Free agent	Jamshedpur	
18 August 2021	(India) Sandesh Jhingan	ATK Mohun Bagan	(Croatia) Šibenik	
18 August 2021	(India) Pritam Kumar Singh	East Bengal	Hyderabad	
19 August 2021	(India) Rahul Bheke	Bengaluru	Mumbai City	
20 August 2021	(India) Komal Thatal	ATK Mohun Bagan	Jamshedpur	
20 August 2021	(Spain) Vicente Gómez	Kerala Blasters	(Greece) Xanthi	
21 August 2021	(Poland) Łukasz Gikiewicz	(Bahrain) East Riffa Club	Chennaiyin	
21 August 2021	(India) Anuj Kumar	Hyderabad	(India) Aizawl (loan)	
22 August 2021	(India) Girik Khosla	East Bengal	(India) Sreenidi Deccan	
23 August 2021	(Malaysia) Liridon Krasniqi	(Malaysia) Johor Darul Ta'zim	Odisha (loan)	
24 August 2021	(India) PC Laldinpuia	(India) Aizawl	Jamshedpur	
25 August 2021	(India) Nongdamba Naorem	ATK Mohun Bagan	Goa	
25 August 2021	(India) C. K. Vineeth	East Bengal	(India) RoundGlass Punjab	
26 August 2021	(Brazil) Cássio Gabriel	(Brazil) Vila Nova	Mumbai City (loan)	
27 August 2021	(Argentina) Jorge Pereyra Díaz	(Argentina) Platense	Kerala Blasters (loan)	
27 August 2021	(India) Phrangki Buam	Goa	(India) Mohammedan (loan)	
28 August 2021	(Spain) Sergio Cidoncha	Kerala Blasters	(Spain) Gimnástica Segoviana	
28 August 2021	(Brazil) Bruno Ramires	(Portugal) Belenenses	Bengaluru	
28 August 2021	(India) Lalthuammawia Ralte	Bengaluru	(India) RoundGlass Punjab	
29 August 2021	(India) Manash Protim Gogoi	Jamshedpur	(India) TRAU	
30 August 2021	(Spain) Javier Siverio	(Spain) Las Palmas II	Hyderabad	
30 August 2021	(Spain) Álvaro Vázquez	(Spain) Sporting de Gijón	Kerala Blasters	
30 August 2021	(India) Amarjit Singh Kiyam	Goa	East Bengal (loan)	
31 August 2021	(India) Subha Ghosh	Kerala Blasters	East Bengal (loan)	
31 August 2021	(Australia) Dylan Fox	NorthEast United	Goa	
31 August 2021	(Brazil) Eli Sabiá	Chennaiyin	Jamshedpur	
31 August 2021	(Bhutan) Chencho Gyeltshen	(India) RoundGlass Punjab	Kerala Blasters	
31 August 2021	(India) Adil Khan	Hyderabad	East Bengal (loan)	
31 August 2021	(India) Shubham Dhas	Goa	(India) NEROCA	
31 August 2021	(India) Naorem Mahesh Singh	Kerala Blasters	East Bengal (loan)	
1 September 2021	(India) Naocha Singh	(India) Gokulam Kerala	Mumbai City	
1 September 2021	(India) Jackichand Singh	Mumbai City	East Bengal (loan)	
1 September 2021	(England) John Johnson	ATK Mohun Bagan	(India) RoundGlass Punjab	
1 September 2021	(India) Niraj Kumar	Jamshedpur	(India) Real Kashmir (loan)	
1 September 2021	(India) Bhupender Singh	Jamshedpur	(India) Real Kashmir (loan)	
1 September 2021	(Spain) Francisco Sandaza	Hyderabad	(Spain) Extremadura UD	
1 September 2021	(India) Gaurav Kankonkar	(India) Sporting Clube de Goa	Kerala Blasters	
1 September 2021	(India) Antonio D'Silva	Goa	(India) Dempo	
2 September 2021	(India) Ishan Pandita	Goa	Jamshedpur	
2 September 2021	(India) Sarineo Fernandes	Goa	East Bengal	
2 September 2021	(India) Romeo Fernandes	Goa	East Bengal	
3 September 2021	(India) Hira Mondal	(India) Mohammedan	East Bengal	
3 September 2021	(India) Joyner Lourenco	Jamshedpur	East Bengal	
3 September 2021	(India) Laldanmawia Ralte	Hyderabad	NorthEast United	
3 September 2021	(India) Hrithik Tiwari	(India) Goa Reserves	Goa	
3 September 2021	(India) Papuia	(India) Goa Reserves	Goa	
3 September 2021	(India) Brison Fernandes	(India) Goa Reserves	Goa	
3 September 2021	(India) Christy Davis	(India) Goa Reserves	Goa	
3 September 2021	(India) Delton Colaco	(India) Goa Reserves	Goa	
4 September 2021	(Hungary) Vladimir Koman	(United Arab Emirates) Hatta Club	Chennaiyin	
5 September 2021	(Australia) Jordan Murray	Kerala Blasters	Jamshedpur	
6 September 2021	(India) Arindam Bhattacharya	ATK Mohun Bagan	East Bengal	
6 September 2021	(India) Sehnaj Singh	East Bengal	NorthEast United	
7 September 2021	(India) Ninthoinganba Meetei	NorthEast United	Chennaiyin	
7 September 2021	(Australia) Brad Inman	ATK Mohun Bagan	Mumbai City	
7 September 2021	(India) Thongkhosiem Haokip	Bengaluru	East Bengal	
7 September 2021	(India) Songpu Singsit	(India) NEROCA	East Bengal	
7 September 2021	(India) Tondonba Singh	Mumbai City	NorthEast United	
8 September 2021	(India) Emanuel Lalchhanchhuaha	Bengaluru	NorthEast United	
8 September 2021	(India) Daniel Gomes	(India) Salgaocar	East Bengal	
8 September 2021	(India) Pronay Halder	ATK Mohun Bagan	Jamshedpur (loan)	
9 September 2021	(India) Lalrinliana Hnamte	(India) Hyderabad Reserves	East Bengal	
9 September 2021	(India) Joe Zoherliana	Bengaluru	NorthEast United	
9 September 2021	(Brazil) Jonathas de Jesus	(United Arab Emirates) Sharjah	Odisha	
10 September 2021	(Spain) Hernán Santana	(Spain) Sporting de Gijón	NorthEast United	
11 September 2021	(Slovenia) Amir Dervišević	(Slovenia) Maribor	East Bengal	
11 September 2021	(India) William Lalnunfela	Jamshedpur	NorthEast United	
12 September 2021	(Scotland) Greg Stewart	(Scotland) Rangers	Jamshedpur	
14 September 2021	(Iran) Iman Basafa	(Iran) Machine Sazi	Bengaluru	
14 September 2021	(Australia) Tomislav Mrcela	(Australia) Perth Glory	East Bengal	
15 September 2021	(Croatia) Franjo Prce	(Croatia) Slaven Belupo	East Bengal	
15 September 2021	(India) Mohammed Irshad	(India) RoundGlass Punjab	NorthEast United	
15 September 2021	(India) Lalchhuanmawia	Chennaiyin	(India) RoundGlass Punjab	
16 September 2021	(Nigeria) Daniel Chima Chukwu	(China) Taizhou Yuanda	East Bengal	
16 September 2021	(Croatia) Marko Lešković	(Croatia) Dinamo Zagreb	Kerala Blasters	
16 September 2021	(India) Jestin George	(India) Gokulam Kerala	NorthEast United	
17 September 2021	(Netherlands) Darren Sidoel	(Spain) Córdoba	East Bengal	
18 September 2021	(Martinique) Mathias Coureur	(Turkey) Samsunspor	NorthEast United	
18 September 2021	(India) Gurkirat Singh	(India) Indian Arrows	Mumbai City	
22 September 2021	(India) Manas Dubey	Hyderabad	(India) TRAU (loan)	
23 September 2021	(Croatia) Antonio Perošević	(Hungary) Újpest	East Bengal	
24 September 2021	(Brazil) Ygor Catatau	(Brazil) Madureira	Mumbai City (loan)	
27 September 2021	(India) Mohammad Nawaz	Goa	Mumbai City	
1 October 2021	(India) Mirshad Michu	East Bengal	NorthEast United	
7 October 2021	(India) Saikhom Goutam Singh	(India) Hyderabad Reserves	East Bengal	
15 October 2021	(India) Siddhant Shirodkar	(India) East Bengal Academy	East Bengal	
26 October 2021	(India) Ritwik Das	Kerala Blasters	Jamshedpur	
1 November 2021	(India) Johnson Joseph Mathews	(India) Hyderabad Academy	Chennaiyin	
2 November 2021	(India) Niraj Kumar	Jamshedpur	(India) Real Kashmir	
3 November 2021	(Australia) Patrick Flottmann	(Australia) Sydney FC Youth	NorthEast United	
6 November 2021	(India) Manvir Singh	(India) Sudeva Delhi	NorthEast United	
7 November 2021	(India) Pragyan Medhi	(India) Indian Arrows	NorthEast United	
9 November 2021	(India) Gani Nigam	(India) Mohammedan	NorthEast United	
10 November 2021	(India) Ponif Vaz	NorthEast United	(India) Real Kashmir	
12 November 2021	(India) Asheer Akhtar	East Bengal	(India) Mohammedan	
25 November 2021	(India) Samuel Lalmuanpuia	Odisha	(India) Aizawl	
6 December 2021	(India) Aman Chetri	Chennaiyin	(India) Rajasthan United	
16 December 2021	(India) Abhishek Halder	Hyderabad	(India) Mohammedan	
21 December 2021	(India) Karanjit Singh	Chennaiyin	Kerala Blasters	
22 December 2021	(India) Akashdeep Singh Kahlon	East Bengal	(India) Rajasthan United	
23 December 2021	(India) Sreekuttan V. S.	Kerala Blasters	(India) Gokulam Kerala (loan)	
23 December 2021	(India) Abdul Hakku	Kerala Blasters	(India) Gokulam Kerala (loan)	
25 December 2021	(India) Melroy Assisi	Chennaiyin	(India) Rajasthan United	
29 December 2021	(India) Seityasen Singh	Kerala Blasters	Hyderabad (loan)	
30 December 2021	(India) Nikhil Prabhu	Hyderabad	Odisha (loan)	
1 January 2022	(Lithuania) Nerijus Valskis	Jamshedpur	Chennaiyin	
1 January 2022	(India) Anwar Ali	(India) Delhi	Goa	
2 January 2022	(India) Mohammad Sajid Dhot	Odisha	Chennaiyin	
5 January 2022	(India) Vinit Rai	Odisha	Mumbai City (loan)	
6 January 2022	(India) Sandesh Jhingan	(Croatia) Šibenik	ATK Mohun Bagan	
10 January 2022	(Brazil) Marcelo Ribeiro	(Portugal) Gil Vicente	East Bengal (loan)	
14 January 2022	(Brazil) Marcelinho	(India) Rajasthan United	NorthEast United (loan)	
15 January 2022	(Nigeria) Daniel Chima Chukwu	East Bengal	Jamshedpur	
20 January 2022	(Brazil) Ygor Catatau	Mumbai City	(Brazil) Madureira	
21 January 2022	(Austria) Marco Sahanek	(Thailand) Nakhon Ratchasima	NorthEast United	
21 January 2022	(Brazil) Diego Maurício	(Qatar) Al-Shahania	Mumbai City	
24 January 2022	(Senegal) Zakaria Diallo	(Kuwait) Al-Shabab	NorthEast United	
25 January 2022	(India) Karan Amin	Jamshedpur	Odisha	
25 January 2022	(India) Antonio D'Silva	(India) Dempo	Odisha	
25 January 2022	(Spain) Fran Sota	(Spain) Calahorra	East Bengal	
26 January 2022	(India) Redeem Tlang	Goa	Odisha (loan)	
27 January 2022	(India) Rahul Kumar Paswan	(India) BSS Sporting Club	East Bengal	
28 January 2022	(India) Subrata Pal	Hyderabad	ATK Mohun Bagan (loan)	
30 January 2022	(India) Ravi Kumar	Odisha	Mumbai City (loan)	
31 January 2022	(India) Naocha Singh	Mumbai City	East Bengal (loan)	
31 January 2022	(India) Lallianzuala Chhangte	Chennaiyin	Mumbai City (loan)	
31 January 2022	(India) Ricky Shabong	ATK Mohun Bagan	(India) Rajasthan United (loan)	
1 February 2022	(Cameroon) Banana Yaya	(Jordan) Shabab Al-Ordon Club	Bengaluru	
1 February 2022	(India) Biswa Darjee	Bengaluru	(India) Rajasthan United (loan)	
2 February 2022	(India) Flan Gomes	Goa	(India) Rajasthan United (loan)	
3 February 2022	(Martinique) Mathias Coureur	NorthEast United	(Bulgaria) PFC Cherno More Varna	
12 February 2022	(Mauritania) Khassa Camara	NorthEast United	Hyderabad	
17 February 2022	(Australia) Tomislav Mrcela	East Bengal	(Australia) Western Sydney Wanderers	
23 February 2022	(Nepal) Ananta Tamang	(Nepal) Three Star Club	East Bengal	

== See also ==
- Indian Super League
- 2021–22 Indian Super League
