= 2021–22 SC East Bengal season =

Indian football club season

East Bengal
2021–22 season
- Owner: Shree Cement East Bengal Foundation
- Head coach: Manolo Díaz (until 28 December 2021); Renedy Singh (interim; from 28 December 2021 until 1 January 2022); Mario Rivera Campesino (from 1 January 2022)
- Stadium: Tilak Maidan Stadium (Note: Due to the COVID-19 pandemic in India, the 2021–22 Indian Super League would be held entirely in Goa, behind closed doors. East Bengal was allotted the Tilak Maidan Stadium as their home ground for the season.)
- ISL: 11th
- CFL: Withdrew
- Top goalscorer: League: Antonio Perošević (4 goals); All: Antonio Perošević (4 goals)
- Average home league attendance: Closed doors
- Biggest win: Goa 1–2 East Bengal (19 January 2022)
| Home colours | Away colours | Third colours |

The 2021–22 season was the 102nd season of Sporting Club East Bengal (EB or SCEB) and their second season in the Indian Super League. Due to the COVID-19 pandemic, the 2021–22 Indian Super League season began on 19 November 2021 and ended on 20 March 2022 with all the matches held in Goa across three venues just like the previous season.

== Background ==
The 2021–22 season is once again set to be played entirely in Goa due to COVID-19 pandemic. The league committee also announced that the number of foreign players that can be registered and fielded is to be reduced, with four foreign players in the playing eleven and a maximum of six can be registered, one of which should be from an Asian nation.

On 8 June, East Bengal Club was handed a transfer ban by FIFA for non-payment of dues for former player Johnny Acosta. The club was also uncertain to participate in the 2020–21 season of Indian Super League as the row between the club and their prime investor group was yet to resolve which threatened their participation in any footballing activity for the season. The AIFF and the FSDL had asked the club authorities to sort out the mess between the club and the investor group soon. East Bengal coach Robbie Fowler too expressed his dissatisfaction over the issue and slammed the club officials for their delay in signing the final termsheet. On 25 June, the club announced that they have cleared off the dues for Johnny Acosta and hence expect the transfer ban to be uplifted by FIFA soon. On 5 July, FIFA officially uplifted the transfer ban on East Bengal, however, the club was on the verge of facing another transfer ban due to non-payment of dues for three more former players: Rakshit Dagar, Pintu Mahata and Abhash Thapa. On 6 August, The All India Football Federation handed another transfer ban to East Bengal due to the non-payment of dues for the three aforementioned players. On 26 August, the transfer ban was lifted by the AIFF after SC East Bengal cleared the dues for the three players.

Due to the tussle between the club and the investor group, East Bengal lost out on a few of their star performers from last season including Bright Enobakhare, Debjit Majumder, Sarthak Golui, Narayan Das and Matti Steinmann. The fans put up a huge protest in front of the club premises on 21 July demanding an immediate solution for the situation. On 25 August, the long-running tussle between the club and the investor group finally came to a solution after a mediatory intervention by the Chief minister of West Bengal Mamata Banerjee, and it was announced that the club will be participating in the 2021–22 Indian Super League with Shree Cement staying on as the investors.

== Transfers ==
=== Incoming ===
| Date | No. | Pos. | Name | Signed from | Fee | Ref |
|---|---|---|---|---|---|---|
| 31 August 2021 | 2 | DF | (India) Daniel Gomes | (India) Salgaocar | Undisclosed | |
| 31 August 2021 | 17 | DF | (India) Sarineo Fernandes | (India) Goa | Undisclosed | |
| 2 September 2021 | 19 | MF | (India) Romeo Fernandes | (India) Goa | Free Transfer | |
| 3 September 2021 | 20 | DF | (India) Hira Mondal | (India) Mohammedan | Free Transfer | |
| 3 September 2021 | 12 | DF | (India) Joyner Lourenco | (India) Jamshedpur | Free Transfer | |
| 6 September 2021 | 29 | GK | (India) Arindam Bhattacharya | (India) ATK Mohun Bagan | Free Transfer | |
| 7 September 2021 | 18 | MF | (India) Sourav Das | (India) Mumbai City | Free Transfer | |
| 7 September 2021 | 16 | MF | (India) Songpu Singsit | (India) Neroca | Free Transfer | |
| 7 September 2021 | 24 | FW | (India) Thongkhosiem Haokip | (India) Bengaluru | Free Transfer | |
| 9 September 2021 | 82 | DF | (India) Lalrinliana Hnamte | (India) Hyderabad | Free Transfer | |
| 11 September 2021 | 21 | MF | (Slovenia) Amir Dervišević | (Slovenia) Maribor | Free Transfer | |
| 14 September 2021 | 4 | DF | (Australia) Tomislav Mrcela | (Australia) Perth Glory | Free Transfer | |
| 15 September 2021 | 71 | DF | (Croatia) Franjo Prce | (Croatia) Slaven Belupo | Free Transfer | |
| 16 September 2021 | 27 | FW | (Nigeria) Daniel Chima Chukwu | (China) Taizhou Yuanda | Free Transfer | |
| 17 September 2021 | 6 | MF | (Netherlands) Darren Sidoel | (Spain) Córdoba | Free Transfer | |
| 23 September 2021 | 7 | FW | (Croatia) Antonio Perošević | (Hungary) Újpest | Free Transfer | |
| 7 October 2021 | 45 | DF | (India) Saikhom Goutam Singh | (India) Hyderabad II | Free Transfer | |
| 7 October 2021 | 43 | FW | (India) Siddhant Shirodkar | (India) Calangute Association | Free Transfer | |
| 7 October 2021 | 26 | DF | (India) Akashdeep Singh Kahlon | (India) Sudeva Delhi | Free Transfer | |
| 25 January 2022 | 77 | MF | (Spain) Fran Sota | (Spain) Calahorra | Free Transfer | |
| 27 January 2022 | 99 | FW | (India) Rahul Paswan | (India) BSS | Free Transfer | |
| 12 February 2022 | 30 | DF | (Nepal) Ananta Tamang | (Nepal) Three Star Club | Free Transfer | |

=== Loan in ===
| Start date | End date | No. | Pos. | Name | Loaned from | Ref |
|---|---|---|---|---|---|---|
| 30 August 2021 | End of season | 80 | MF | (India) Amarjit Singh Kiyam | (India) Goa | |
| 31 August 2021 | End of season | 5 | FD | (India) Adil Khan | (India) Hyderabad | |
| 31 August 2021 | End of season | 10 | MF | (India) Jackichand Singh | (India) Mumbai City | |
| 31 August 2021 | End of season | 11 | FW | (India) Subha Ghosh | (India) Kerala Blasters | |
| 31 August 2021 | End of season | 13 | FW | (India) Naorem Mahesh Singh | (India) Kerala Blasters | |
| 10 January 2022 | End of season | 9 | FW | (Brazil) Marcelo Ribeiro | (Portugal) Gil Vicente | |
| 31 January 2022 | End of season | 50 | DF | (India) Naocha Singh | (India) Mumbai City | |

=== Outgoing ===
| Exit Date | No. | Pos. | Name | Signed to | Fee | Ref |
|---|---|---|---|---|---|---|
| 1 June 2021 | — | MF | (India) Brandon Vanlalremdika | (India) Mohammedan | Released | |
| 1 June 2021 | — | DF | (India) Rino Anto | (India) Roundglass Punjab | Released | |
| 1 June 2021 | — | DF | (India) Gurtej Singh | (India) Roundglass Punjab | Released | |
| 1 June 2021 | — | DF | (India) Soraisam Pritam Singh | (India) Hyderabad | Released | |
| 1 June 2021 | — | MF | (India) Prakash Sarkar | (India) Calcutta Customs | Released | |
| 1 June 2021 | — | DF | (England) Calum Woods | (Wales) Bala Town | Released | |
| 1 June 2021 | — | DF | (India) Keegan Pereira | (India) Roundglass Punjab | Released | |
| 1 June 2021 | — | LB | (India) Sagolsem Bikash Singh | (India) TRAU | Released | |
| 1 June 2021 | 4 | DF | (Scotland) Danny Fox | — | Released | |
| 1 June 2021 | 10 | FW | (Nigeria) Bright Enobakhare | (England) Coventry City | Released | |
| 1 June 2021 | 12 | MF | (India) Jeje Lalpekhlua | — | Released | |
| 1 June 2021 | 16 | DF | (India) Rana Gharami | (India) Bengaluru United | Released | |
| 1 June 2021 | 17 | MF | (India) Yumnam Singh | (India) Bengaluru United | Released | |
| 1 June 2021 | 18 | MF | (India) Eugeneson Lyngdoh | — | Released | |
| 1 June 2021 | 19 | MF | (Democratic Republic of the Congo) Jacques Maghoma | (England) Spalding United | Released | |
| 1 June 2021 | 20 | FW | (Wales) Aaron Amadi-Holloway | (England) Burton Albion | Released | |
| 1 June 2021 | 21 | LB | (India) Narayan Das | (India) Chennaiyin | Released | |
| 1 June 2021 | 22 | MF | (Republic of Ireland) Anthony Pilkington | (England) Fleetwood Town | Released | |
| 1 June 2021 | 24 | GK | (India) Debjit Majumder | (India) Chennaiyin | Released | |
| 1 June 2021 | 26 | MF | (India) Sehnaj Singh | (India) NorthEast United | Released | |
| 1 June 2021 | 27 | RB | (India) Lalramchullova | (India) Mohammedan | Released | |
| 1 June 2021 | 28 | FW | (India) Girik Khosla | (India) Sreenidi Deccan | Released | |
| 1 June 2021 | 29 | MF | (India) Surchandra Singh | (India) Real Kashmir | Released | |
| 1 June 2021 | 30 | FW | (India) C. K. Vineeth | (India) Roundglass Punjab | Released | |
| 1 June 2021 | 32 | GK | (India) Mirshad Michu | (India) NorthEast United | Released | |
| 1 June 2021 | 34 | FW | (India) Harmanpreet Singh | (India) Bengaluru | Released | |
| 1 June 2021 | 35 | MF | (India) Milan Singh | (India) Mohammedan | Released | |
| 1 June 2021 | 70 | DF | (India) Sarthak Golui | (India) Bengaluru | Released | |
| 16 June 2021 | 6 | CM | (Germany) Matti Steinmann | (Australia) Brisbane Roar | Free Transfer | |
| 8 November 2021 | — | CB | (India) Asheer Akhtar | (India) Mohammedan | Released | |
| 15 January 2022 | 27 | FW | (Nigeria) Daniel Chima Chukwu | (India) Jamshedpur | Free Transfer | |
| 25 January 2022 | 21 | MF | (Slovenia) Amir Dervišević | — | Released | |
| 17 February 2022 | 4 | DF | (Australia) Tomislav Mrcela | (Australia) WS Wanderers | Released | |

== Team ==
=== First-team squad ===
As of 5 March 2022

| No. | Name | Nat. | Pos. | Date of Birth (Age) | Signed From | Apps | Goals |
Goalkeepers
| 1 | Sankar Roy | (India) | GK | 9 May 1995 (age 31) | (India) ATK Mohun Bagan | 6 | 0 |
| 25 | Suvam Sen | (India) | GK | 14 November 1989 (age 36) | (India) United | 5 | 0 |
| 29 | Arindam Bhattacharya (captain) | (India) | GK | 11 December 1989 (age 36) | (India) ATK Mohun Bagan | 11 | 0 |
Defenders
| 2 | Daniel Gomes | (India) | CB | 7 September 1997 (age 29) | (India) Salgaocar | 2 | 0 |
| 5 | Adil Khan (vice-captain) | (India) | CB | 7 July 1988 (age 38) | (India) Hyderabad | 14 | 0 |
| 12 | Joyner Lourenco | (India) | CB | 8 September 1991 (age 35) | (India) Jamshedpur | 11 | 0 |
| 17 | Sarineo Fernandes | (India) | LB | 9 February 1999 (age 27) | (India) Goa | 0 | 0 |
| 20 | Hira Mondal | (India) | LB | 31 August 1996 (age 30) | (India) Mohammedan Sporting | 16 | 0 |
| 26 | Akashdeep Singh Kahlon | (India) | RB | 26 July 1993 (age 33) | (India) Sudeva Delhi | 0 | 0 |
| 30 | Ananta Tamang | (Nepal) | CB | 14 January 1998 (age 28) | (Nepal) Three Star Club | 1 | 0 |
| 45 | Saikhom Goutam Singh | (India) | CB/RB | 27 January 2002 (age 24) | (India) Hyderabad II | 0 | 0 |
| 47 | Raju Gaikwad | (India) | CB/RB | 25 September 1990 (age 36) | (India) Kerala Blasters | 90 | 1 |
| 50 | Naocha Singh | (India) | LB | 24 August 1999 (age 27) | (India) Mumbai City | 5 | 0 |
| 55 | Ankit Mukherjee | (India) | RB | 10 July 1996 (age 30) | (India) ATK Mohun Bagan | 18 | 0 |
| 71 | Franjo Prce | (Croatia) | CB/LB | 7 January 1996 (age 30) | (Croatia) Slaven Belupo | 15 | 1 |
Midfielders
| 6 | Darren Sidoel | (Netherlands) | DM | 10 March 1998 (age 28) | (Spain) Córdoba | 11 | 3 |
| 8 | Mohammed Rafique | (India) | CM | 26 March 1991 (age 35) | (India) Mumbai City | 116 | 10 |
| 10 | Jackichand Singh | (India) | RW | 17 March 1992 (age 34) | (India) Mumbai City | 14 | 0 |
| 14 | Wahengbam Angousana | (India) | CM | 2 February 1996 (age 30) | (India) TRAU | 28 | 0 |
| 16 | Songpu Singsit | (India) | LW | 2 June 1999 (age 27) | (India) Neroca | 2 | 0 |
| 18 | Sourav Das | (India) | CM | 20 June 1996 (age 30) | (India) Mumbai City | 21 | 0 |
| 19 | Romeo Fernandes | (India) | RW | 6 July 1992 (age 34) | (India) Goa | 9 | 0 |
| 22 | Lalrinliana Hnamte | (India) | DM | 29 April 2003 (age 23) | (India) Hyderabad | 17 | 1 |
| 23 | Bikash Jairu | (India) | LW | 10 November 1990 (age 35) | (India) Jamshedpur | 49 | 6 |
| 33 | Loken Meitei | (India) | CM/LW | 4 May 1997 (age 29) | (India) TRAU | 1 | 0 |
| 77 | Fran Sota | (Spain) | CM | 30 October 1990 (age 35) | (Spain) Calahorra | 5 | 0 |
| 80 | Amarjit Singh Kiyam | (India) | DM | 6 January 2001 (age 25) | (India) Goa | 16 | 0 |
Forwards
| 7 | Antonio Perošević | (Croatia) | FW | 6 March 1992 (age 34) | (Hungary) Újpest | 14 | 4 |
| 9 | Marcelo Ribeiro | (Brazil) | FW | 27 July 1997 (age 29) | (Portugal) Gil Vicente | 6 | 0 |
| 11 | Subha Ghosh | (India) | FW | 22 December 2000 (age 25) | (India) Kerala Blasters | 3 | 0 |
| 13 | Naorem Mahesh Singh | (India) | FW | 1 March 1999 (age 27) | (India) Kerala Blasters | 18 | 2 |
| 15 | Balwant Singh | (India) | FW | 15 December 1986 (age 39) | (India) ATK | 8 | 0 |
| 24 | Thongkhosiem Haokip | (India) | FW | 13 March 1993 (age 33) | (India) Bengaluru | 20 | 3 |
| 43 | Siddhant Shirodkar | (India) | FW | 4 March 2003 (age 23) | (India) Calangute Association | 1 | 0 |
| 99 | Rahul Paswan | (India) | FW | 19 April 1998 (age 28) | (India) BSS | 1 | 0 |

=== New contracts ===
| No. | Pos. | Date | Name | Ref. |
|---|---|---|---|---|
| 55 | DF | 29 August 2021 | (India) Ankit Mukherjee | |
| 47 | DF | 29 August 2021 | (India) Raju Gaikwad | |
| 1 | GK | 30 August 2021 | (India) Sankar Roy | |

== Coaching staff ==
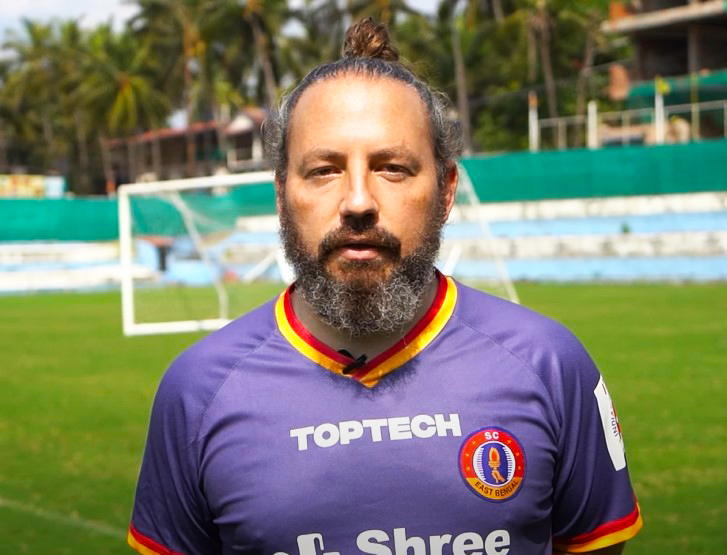
Mario Rivera as the head coach of the team.

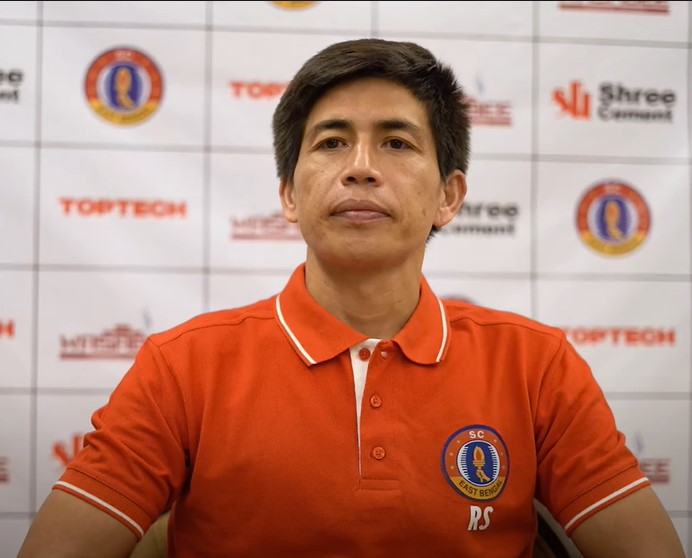
Renedy Singh as the interim head coach of the team.

On 8 September, East Bengal announced that the club has mutually terminated the contract with coach Robbie Fowler, and announced the arrival of former Real Madrid Castilla coach Manolo Díaz as the new head coach for the season. East Bengal also appointed former Real Madrid coach Angel Puebla Garcia as the assistant coach. He will also be fulfilling the responsibilities of a strength and fitness coach. The club also announced that Renedy Singh will be continuing his role as the assistant coach. East Bengal appointed Malaysian fitness coach Joseph Ronald D'Angelus as the head of sport science, and former Chelsea and Crystal Palace coach Leslie Cleevely as the goalkeeping coach for the season. On 28 September, East Bengal announced the signing of former head-coach Mridul Banerjee as the team manager. On 11 November, East Bengal announced that they have parted ways with Joseph Ronald D'Angelus due to some personal reasons.

On 28 December, East Bengal announced that they have parted ways with head coach Manolo Díaz and assistant Angel Puebla Garcia after they failed to win even one game in their eight-match tenure. Renedy Singh has been appointed as the interim head coach of the team. On 1 January, East Bengal announced that former head coach Mario Rivera Campesino has been appointed as the new head coach for the season. On 16 January, East Bengal announced that goalkeeper coach Les Cleevely would leave his position and return home for personal reasons and he would be replaced by Mihir Sawant. On 6 February, East Bengal announced the appointment of Victor Herrero Forcada as the assistant coach for the remainder of the season.

| Position | Name |
|---|---|
| Head coach | (Spain) Mario Rivera Campesino |
| Assistant coach | (Spain) Victor Herrero Forcada |
| Strength & Conditioning coach | (India) Rudra Pratim Roy |
| Goalkeeping coach | (India) Mihir Sawant |
| Team Manager | (India) Mridul Banerjee |

== Kit ==
East Bengal launched its kits for the season on 6 November 2021. The traditional red and gold fields, vertically split into two halves returned after four seasons as the home kit. The away kit is white with red and gold trim on the collar, sleeves, and bottom of the shirt. The third kit is an evolution of last season's away kit, paying tribute to Bengal's love for fish and East Bengal's connection with Ilish (Hilsa).

| Home | Away | Third | Goalkeeper (1) | Goalkeeper (2) | Goalkeeper (3) |

== Preseason ==
East Bengal started their squad building for the new season late, only after the settlement between the club and the investor group on 25 August. Hira Mondal became the first recruit of the window from Mohammedan Sporting. On 29 August, the club signed the former India U-17 captain Amarjit Singh Kiyam on a season-long loan from Goa. The club also roped in young left-back Sarineo Fernandes from Goa and Sourav Das from Mumbai City on a permanent transfer. On 31 August, the deadline day, East Bengal signed a handful of players: Songpu Singsit from Neroca, Romeo Fernandes from Goa, Joyner Lourenco from Jamshedpur, Thongkhosiem Haokip from Bengaluru, Daniel Gomes from Salgaocar, Subha Ghosh and Naorem Mahesh Singh on loan from Kerala Blasters, Jackichand Singh on loan from Mumbai City, and Adil Khan on loan from Hyderabad. On 6 September, East Bengal announced the signing of 2020–21 Indian Super League golden gloves winning goalkeeper Arindam Bhattacharya in a free-transfer from ATK Mohun Bagan.

On 11 September, East Bengal announced their first foreign signing of the season as they roped in Slovenian midfielder Amir Dervišević from NK Maribor on a free transfer. East Bengal also roped in former Perth Glory defender Tomislav Mrcela, former Lazio defender Franjo Prce, Nigerian forward Daniel Chima Chukwu, former Ajax under–19 captain Darren Sidoel, and Croatian forward Antonio Perošević as the foreign signings for the season.

The East Bengal team and staff reached Goa on 29–30 September and after spending a mandatory quarantine of seven days in the team hotel, the team started their pre-season training. East Bengal will be playing few friendly matches against other Indian Super League teams as a part of their pre-season preparation ahead of the Indian Super League campaign. On 14 October, East Bengal announced two pre-season friendly matches against Goa Professional League teams: Vasco and Salgaocar on 15 and 16 October at the Don Bosco Ground in Fatorda. In the first pre-season match against Vasco, East Bengal won 3–1 with Thongkhosiem Haokip, Subha Ghosh and Siddhant Shirodkar scoring the team. In the second match against Salgaocar, East Bengal won 2–0 with midfielders Amir Dervišević and Sourav Das scoring for the team. In the third pre-season game on 20 October, East Bengal defeated the reigning I-League champions Gokulam Kerala 2–1 with goals from Balwant Singh and Wahengbam Angousana. On 13 November, East Bengal announced their veteran goalkeeper Arindam Bhattacharya as the captain and Croatian defender Tomislav Mrcela as the vice-captain for the season. On 14 November, East Bengal faced 2020–21 Indian Super League champions Mumbai City in their fourth pre-season friendly and held the defending champions to a 1–1 draw. Cassinho scored for Mumbai in the first half while Sourav Das scored the equaliser for East Bengal in the second half.

=== Preseason friendlies ===
Win Draw Loss

| 15 October 2021 Friendly | East Bengal | 3–1 | Vasco | Fatorda, Goa |
| 08:00 IST | Haokip 38'; Ghosh 54'; Shirodkar 87' | Report | Costa 84' | Stadium: Don Bosco Ground |

| 16 October 2021 Friendly | East Bengal | 2–0 | Salgaocar | Fatorda, Goa |
| 08:00 IST | Dervišević 6' (pen.); Das 65' | Report | | Stadium: Don Bosco Ground |

| 20 October 2021 Friendly | East Bengal | 2–1 | Gokulam Kerala | Fatorda, Goa |
| 15:30 IST | Balwant 40'; Angousana 45+2' | Report | Osumanu 71' | Stadium: Don Bosco Ground |

| 14 November 2021 Friendly | East Bengal | 1–1 | Mumbai City | Nagoa, Goa |
| 16:00 IST | Das 60' | | Cassinho 45' | Stadium: Nagoa Village Panchayat Football Ground |

== Competitions ==
=== Overall ===
| Competition | First match | Latest match | Final Position |
|---|---|---|---|
| Calcutta Football League | Did not play (Note: East Bengal informed the IFA about the unavailability of their team and decided not to play any of the matches. The IFA decided to handover walkovers to all the opponents in the respective fixtures that was announced.) | | Elimination round |
| Indian Super League | 21 November 2021 | 5 March 2022 | 11th |

=== Overview ===
| Competition | Record | | | | | | | |
| Competition | Pld | W | D | L | GF | GA | GD | Win % |
|---|---|---|---|---|---|---|---|---|
| Calcutta Football League | 7 | 0 | 0 | 7 | 0 | 21 | −21 | 0.00 |
| Indian Super League | 20 | 1 | 8 | 11 | 18 | 36 | −18 | 5.00 |
| Total | 27 | 1 | 8 | 18 | 18 | 57 | −39 | 3.70 |

Last updated: 5 March 2022
Source: Competitions

=== Calcutta Football League ===
==== Summary ====
On 1 July 2021, the Indian Football Association announced that the 2021 CFL Premier Division will be held in mid-August, without any spectators, adhering to all the protocols due to the COVID-19 pandemic. The committee has also announced that there will be a change in the format of the tournament with 14 teams likely to be divided into two groups and the top 8 teams will reach the knockout stage and play each other in the quarter-finals. However, the participation of East Bengal club was uncertain due to the tussle between the club and the investor group. On 25 August, after the differences were put to a stop by the intervention of Mamata Banerjee, the club has expressed the willingness to participate in the Calcutta Football League.

The fixtures for the 2021 CFL Premier Division was officially announced on 1 August by the Indian Football Association. East Bengal was set to start their campaign on 31 August against Bhawanipore, however, the club informed the IFA about the unavailability of the team and the match was cancelled. On 6 September, the IFA released fresh schedule for East Bengal where they are supposed to face BSS Sporting Club on 7 September, however, East Bengal management has notified the IFA that the team is not available yet and they will not be participating in the tournament. The IFA decided to handover all the matches to the respective opponents as walkovers and East Bengal finished at the bottom of the group.

==== League table ====
Group A

| Pos | Team | Pld | W | D | L | GF | GA | GD | Pts | Qualification or relegation |
|---|---|---|---|---|---|---|---|---|---|---|
| 3 | United | 6 | 4 | 1 | 1 | 11 | 5 | +6 | 13 | Qualified for Quarterfinals |
| 4 | Mohammedan | 6 | 3 | 1 | 2 | 10 | 5 | +5 | 10 | Relegated to Elimination round |
| 5 | Railway | 6 | 2 | 1 | 3 | 8 | 9 | −1 | 7 | Relegated to Elimination round |
| 6 | Southern Samity | 6 | 1 | 0 | 5 | 7 | 12 | −5 | 3 | Relegated to Elimination round |
| 7 | East Bengal | 6 | 0 | 0 | 6 | 0 | 18 | −18 | 0 | Relegated to Elimination round |

Updated to match(es) played on 3 September 2021. Source: The Away End

Quarter-finals
1 October 2021 – Kalyani
BSS | 1
George Telegraph | 2
5 October 2021 – Naihati Stadium
Peerless | 0
Railway | 4
2 October 2021 – Naihati Stadium
United | 3
Calcutta Customs | 2
9 October 2021 – Kalyani
Bhawanipore | 0
Mohammedan | 7

Semi-finals
8 October 2021 - Naihati Stadium
George Telegraph | 0
Railway (a.e.t.) | 1
12 October 2021 - Kalyani
United | 0
Mohammedan | 1

Final
18 November 2021 - Salt Lake Stadium
Railway | 0
Mohammedan | 1

==== Fixtures and results ====
Win Draw Loss Void

| 31 August 2021 1 | Bhawanipore | w/o | East Bengal | Kalyani |
| 14:45 IST | | Report | | Stadium: Kalyani Stadium |
Note: Bhawanipore were awarded walkover win by 3 goals since East Bengal didn't turn up for the match

| 3 September 2021 2 | East Bengal | w/o | United | Kalyani |
| 14:45 IST | | | | Stadium: Kalyani Stadium |
Note: The match was cancelled as East Bengal informed the unavailability of their team to IFA prior to the match. United was handed a walkover.

| 7 September 2021 3 | East Bengal | w/o | BSS | — |
| — | | | | Stadium: — |
Note: The match was cancelled as East Bengal informed the unavailability of their team to IFA prior to the match. BSS was handed a walkover.

| 12 September 2021 3 | East Bengal | w/o | Mohammedan Sporting | — |
| — | | | | Stadium: — |
Note: The match was cancelled as East Bengal informed the unavailability of their team to IFA prior to the match. Mohammedan Sporting was handed a walkover.

| 15 September 2021 5 | East Bengal | w/o | Railway | — |
| — | | | | Stadium: — |
Note: The match was cancelled as East Bengal informed the unavailability of their team to IFA prior to the match. Railway was handed a walkover.

| — 6 | East Bengal | w/o | Southern Samity | — |
| TBD | | | | Stadium: — |
Note: The match was cancelled as East Bengal informed the unavailability of their team to IFA prior to the match. Southern Samity was handed a walkover.

| 28 September 2021 Qualifier | Aryan | w/o | East Bengal | — |
| TBD | | | | Stadium: — |
Note: The match was cancelled as East Bengal informed the unavailability of their team to IFA prior to the match. Aryan was handed a walkover.

=== Indian Super League ===
==== Summary ====
Due to the COVID-19 pandemic, the 2021–22 season will once again be held entirely in Goa under a secured bio-bubble. The club was allotted the Tilak Maidan Stadium as their home ground for the season. On 13 September, the fixtures for the first leg was announced.

East Bengal began their campaign against Jamshedpur at the Tilak Maidan Stadium on 21 November with a 1–1 draw, with Franjo Prce putting East Bengal ahead in the seventeenth minute only for Peter Hartley to equalise in the injury time of the first half to share points. East Bengal faced ATK Mohun Bagan FC next in the Kolkata Derby at the Tilak Maidan Stadium on 27 November and suffered a 0–3 defeat with three first-half goals from Roy Krishna, Manvir Singh and Liston Colaco. Coach Manolo Diaz admitted that there is a big gap in quality between the two teams. East Bengal faced Odisha next on 30 November at the Tilak Maidan and suffered a 6–4 defeat. Darren Sidoel had put East Bengal ahead in the 13th minute but Odisha rallied from behind with Héctor Rodas scoring twice and Javier Hernández scoring directly from the corner-kick to take a 3–1 lead at half time. Aridai Cabrera scored two more in the second half while Isak Vanlalruatfela scored another as Odisha scored six goals against East Bengal in consecutive matches. Thongkhosiem Haokip scored one and Daniel Chima Chukwu scored twice as East Bengal reduced the margin late in the game. East Bengal coach Manolo Diaz expressed his frustrations after the game as he claimed: "We don't have enough quality to play matches in the Indian Super League".

East Bengal faced Chennaiyin in their fourth match on 3 December and managed a 0–0 goalless draw against the two-time champions. Hira Mondal was adjudged the man-of-the-match for his excellent defensive display to secure one point for the team. On 7 December, East Bengal went down 3–4 against Goa at the Tilak Maidan Stadium. Antonio Perosevic scored a brace while Amir Dervisevic scored one for East Bengal while Alberto Noguera scored twice along with goals from Jorge Ortiz and an own-goal from Perosevic as East Bengal suffered their third defeat in five matches. East Bengal faced Kerala Blasters next on 12 December at the Tilak Maidan and drew 1–1. Australian defender Tomislav Mrcela put East Bengal ahead in the thirty-seventh minute of the game with a header from a long throw-in by Raju Gaikwad but Álvaro Vázquez equalised for Kerala just before the half-time as both teams shared points. On 17 December, East Bengal faced NorthEast United and succumbed to their fourth defeat as the Highlanders won 2–0 with two second-half goals from V.P. Suhair and Patrick Flottmann. Croatian forward Antonio Perosevic was given marching orders after he assaulted the referee in the dying minutes of the game. The Croatian was handed a five-match ban for the incident. East Bengal faced Hyderabad in their eighth match on 23 December at the GMC Athletic Stadium and managed to get another point after the match ended 1–1. Amir Dervisevic put East Bengal ahead in the 20th minute from a free-kick but Bartholomew Ogbeche restored parity in the 35th minute as both the teams shared the points.

On 4 January, East Bengal faced Bengaluru at the Bambolim Stadium and managed another 1–1 draw, led by interim head coach Renedy Singh. Thongkhosiem Haokip put East Bengal ahead in the 28th minute of the game with a header from a set piece by Wahengbam Angousana. Bengaluru equalised in the second half via an own goal from Sourav Das in the 55th minute as both teams shared points. East Bengal faced the defending champions Mumbai City next on 7 January at the Tilak Maidan Stadium and played out a goalless draw to end the first leg of the season without a single win. Renedy Singh, who was once again in charge of the team, applauded his injury-stricken side for the performance against the defending champions despite playing with just one foreign player. East Bengal faced Jamshedpur in the next match on 11 January and suffered another defeat as Ishan Pandita scored a late winner in the 88th minute to hand Jamshedpur a 1–0 win. Interim head coach Renedy Singh had fielded an all Indian starting eleven against Jamshedpur, a first of a kind in the history of the Indian Super League.

On 19 January, East Bengal faced Goa at the Bambolim Stadium and snatched their first victory of the season as they won 2–1 with Naorem Mahesh Singh scoring a brace for the team. Alberto Noguera scored the only goal for Goa. East Bengal thus ended their winless streak after 346 days, since their victory against Jamshedpur in the previous season. This was also the first game in charge for new head coach Mario Rivera. East Bengal faced Hyderabad next on 24 January at the Bambolim Stadium and suffered a 4–0 defeat. Bartholomew Ogbeche scored a hattrick while Aniket Jadhav scored the other as East Bengal suffered their sixth defeat of the season. On 29 January, East Bengal faced rivals ATK Mohun Bagan and suffered a 3–1 defeat after conceding two late goals in the injury time, as Kiyan Nassiri scored a hattrick for ATK Mohun Bagan after Darren Sidoel had put East Bengal ahead in the 56th minute.

On 2 February, East Bengal faced Chennaiyin at the Tilak Maidan and rallied from 0–2 behind to make a 2–2 comeback in the injury time. Chennaiyin took the lead in the second minute after Hira Mondal scored an own-goal and Ninthoinganba Meetei doubled the lead in the 15th minute. Darren Sidoel scored directly from a free-kick in the 61st minute for East Bengal to reduce the deficit while Lalrinliana Hnamte headed in the equaliser in the 91st minute to complete the comeback and earn another point for East Bengal.

==== League table ====
| Pos | Team | Pld | W | D | L | GF | GA | GD | Pts |
|---|---|---|---|---|---|---|---|---|---|
| 7 | Odisha | 20 | 6 | 5 | 9 | 31 | 43 | −12 | 23 |
| 8 | Chennaiyin | 20 | 5 | 5 | 10 | 17 | 35 | −18 | 20 |
| 9 | Goa | 20 | 4 | 7 | 9 | 29 | 35 | −6 | 19 |
| 10 | NorthEast United | 20 | 3 | 5 | 12 | 25 | 43 | −18 | 14 |
| 11 | East Bengal | 20 | 1 | 8 | 11 | 18 | 36 | −18 | 11 |

Source: Indian Super League
Rules for classification: 1) points; 2) head-to-head points; 3) head-to-head goal difference; 4) head-to-head goals scored; 5) goal difference; 6) number of goals scored; 7) fair play ranking; 8) drawing of lots

==== Result summary ====
| Overall | | | | | | | | Home | | | | | | Away | | | | | |
| Pld | W | D | L | GF | GA | GD | Pts | W | D | L | GF | GA | GD | W | D | L | GF | GA | GD |
|---|---|---|---|---|---|---|---|---|---|---|---|---|---|---|---|---|---|---|---|
| 20 | 1 | 8 | 11 | 18 | 36 | −18 | 11 | 0 | 5 | 5 | 9 | 19 | −10 | 1 | 3 | 6 | 9 | 17 | −8 |

==== Results by match ====
| Match | 1 | 2 | 3 | 4 | 5 | 6 | 7 | 8 | 9 | 10 | 11 | 12 | 13 | 14 | 15 | 16 | 17 | 18 | 19 | 20 |
|---|---|---|---|---|---|---|---|---|---|---|---|---|---|---|---|---|---|---|---|---|
| Ground | H | H | A | A | H | H | A | A | A | H | A | A | H | A | H | H | A | H | H | A |
| Result | D | L | L | D | L | D | L | D | D | D | L | W | L | L | D | L | L | L | D | L |
| Position | 3 | 9 | 10 | 9 | 11 | 11 | 11 | 11 | 11 | 11 | 11 | 10 | 11 | 11 | 10 | 10 | 10 | 11 | 11 | 11 |

Updated to match(es) played on 5 March 2022. Source: indiansuperleague.com
A = Away; H = Home; W = Win; D = Draw; L = Loss

==== Matches ====
The season fixtures for the first 10 matches were released on 13 September. East Bengal began their campaign against Jamshedpur on 21 November 2021. The second half of the fixtures were announced on 21 December.

Win Draw Loss Void

| 21 November 2021 1 | East Bengal | 1–1 | Jamshedpur | Vasco da Gama, Goa |
| 19:30 IST | Prce 17'; Das (yellow card) 49' | Report | Hartley 45'; Gahlot (yellow card) 79' | Stadium: Tilak Maidan Stadium; Attendance: 0 Referee: Crystal John; Man of the Match: Antonio Perošević (East Bengal) |

| 27 November 2021 2 | East Bengal | 0–3 | ATK Mohun Bagan | Vasco da Gama, Goa |
| 19:30 IST | Hnamte (yellow card) 7'; Sidoel (yellow card) 27'; Perošević (yellow card) 83' | Report | Krishna 14'; Singh 14'; Colaco 23' | Stadium: Tilak Maidan Stadium; Attendance: 0 Referee: Rahul Kumar Gupta; Man of the Match: Joni Kauko (ATK Mohun Bagan) |

| 30 November 2021 3 | Odisha | 6–4 | East Bengal | Vasco da Gama, Goa |
| 19:30 IST | Rodas 33', 40'; Hernandez 45'; Cabrera 71', 90+3'; Vanlalruatfela 82' | Report | Sidoel 13'; Mondal (yellow card) 61'; Haokip 81'; Chukwu 90', 90+2' (pen.) | Stadium: Tilak Maidan Stadium; Attendance: 0 Referee: Harish Kundu; Man of the Match: Héctor Rodas (Odisha) |

| 3 December 2021 4 | Chennaiyin | 0–0 | East Bengal | Vasco da Gama, Goa |
| 19:30 IST | Ali (yellow card) 55'; Damjanović (yellow card) 74' | Report | Das (yellow card) 90' | Stadium: Tilak Maidan Stadium; Attendance: 0 Referee: Crystal John; Man of the Match: Hira Mondal (East Bengal) |

| 7 December 2021 5 | East Bengal | 3–4 | Goa | Vasco da Gama, Goa |
| 19:30 IST | Perošević 25', 59'; Dervišević 37'; Khan (yellow card) 65'; Gaikwad (yellow card) 83' | Report | Noguera 14', 79'; Gama (yellow card) 19'; Fernandes (yellow card) 25'; Ortiz 32' (pen.); Perošević 44' (o.g.) | Stadium: Tilak Maidan Stadium; Attendance: 0 Referee: C. R. Srikrishna; Man of the Match: Alberto Noguera (Goa) |

| 12 December 2021 6 | East Bengal | 1–1 | Kerala Blasters | Vasco da Gama, Goa |
| 19:30 IST | Haokip (yellow card) 11'; Kiyam (yellow card) 23'; Mrcela 37'; Hnamte (yellow card) 65' | Report | Vázquez 44' | Stadium: Tilak Maidan Stadium; Attendance: 0 Referee: R Venkatesh; Man of the Match: Adrian Luna (Kerala Blasters) |

| 17 December 2021 7 | NorthEast United | 2–0 | East Bengal | Margao, Goa |
| 19:30 IST | Rochharzela (yellow card) 41'; Lalkhawpuimawia (yellow card) 46'; Suhair 61'; Flottmann 68' | Report | Naorem (yellow card) 45'; Perošević (red card) 90' | Stadium: Fatorda Stadium; Attendance: 0 Referee: Rahul Kumar Gupta; Man of the Match: Khassa Camara (NorthEast United) |

| 23 December 2021 8 | Hyderabad | 1–1 | East Bengal | Bambolim, Goa |
| 19:30 IST | Ogbeche 35'; Juanan (yellow card) 90' | Report | Dervišević 20'; Naorem (yellow card) 90' | Stadium: GMC Athletic Stadium; Attendance: 0 Referee: Aditya Purkayastha; Man of the Match: Lalrinliana Hnamte (East Bengal) |

| 4 January 2022 9 | Bengaluru | 1–1 | East Bengal | Bambolim, Goa |
| 19:30 IST | Roshan (yellow card) 27'; Das 55' (o.g.) | Report | Bhattacharya (yellow card) 3'; Haokip 28'; Mukherjee (yellow card) 87' | Stadium: GMC Athletic Stadium; Attendance: 0 Referee: Harish Kundu; Man of the Match: Adil Khan (East Bengal) |

| 7 January 2022 10 | East Bengal | 0–0 | Mumbai City | Vasco da Gama, Goa |
| 19:30 IST | Balwant (yellow card) 90' | Report | Jahouh (yellow card) 81' | Stadium: Tilak Maidan Stadium; Attendance: 0 Referee: Senthil Nathan; Man of the Match: Sourav Das (East Bengal) |

| 11 January 2022 11 | Jamshedpur | 1–0 | East Bengal | Bambolim, Goa |
| 19:30 IST | Pandita 88' | Report | | Stadium: GMC Athletic Stadium; Attendance: 0 Referee: Crystal John; Man of the Match: Greg Stewart (Jamshedpur) |

| 19 January 2022 12 | Goa | 1–2 | East Bengal | Bambolim, Goa |
| 19:30 IST | Noguera 37'; Jesuraj (yellow card) 45' | Report | Naorem 9', 42'; Balwant (yellow card) 90' | Stadium: GMC Athletic Stadium; Attendance: 0 Referee: Aditya Purkayastha; Man of the Match: Naorem Mahesh Singh (East Bengal) |

| 24 January 2022 13 | East Bengal | 0–4 | Hyderabad | Vasco da Gama, Goa |
| 19:30 IST | Mukherjee (yellow card) 26'; Prce (penalty missed) 85' | Report | Ogbeche 21', 44', 74'; Rai (yellow card) 38'; Jadhav 45' | Stadium: Tilak Maidan Stadium; Attendance: 0 Referee: Rahul Kumar Gupta; Man of the Match: Bartholomew Ogbeche (Hyderabad) |

| 29 January 2022 14 | ATK Mohun Bagan | 3–1 | East Bengal | Margao, Goa |
| 19:30 IST | Williams (yellow card) 44' (penalty missed) 67'; Nassiri 64', 90', 90'; McHugh (yellow card) 79' | Report | Sidoel 56'; Mondal (yellow card) 60' | Stadium: Fatorda Stadium; Attendance: 0 Referee: Crystal John; Man of the Match: Kiyan Nassiri (ATK Mohun Bagan) |

| 2 February 2022 15 | East Bengal | 2–2 | Chennaiyin | Vasco da Gama, Goa |
| 19:30 IST | Mondal (yellow card) 12'; Sidoel 61'; Hnamte 90' | Report | Mondal 2' (o.g.); Meetei 15'; Dhot (yellow card) 38' | Stadium: Tilak Maidan Stadium; Attendance: 0 Referee: Ashwin; Man of the Match: Darren Sidoel (East Bengal) |

| 7 February 2022 16 | East Bengal | 1–2 | Odisha | Vasco da Gama, Goa |
| 19:30 IST | Perošević 64' (yellow card) 66' | Report | Jonathas 23'; Hernández 75'; Panwar (yellow card) 89' | Stadium: Tilak Maidan Stadium; Attendance: 0 Referee: Rowan Arumughan; Man of the Match: Javi Hernández (Odisha) |

| 14 February 2022 17 | Kerala Blasters | 1–0 | East Bengal | Vasco da Gama, Goa |
| 19:30 IST | Sipović 49'; Soraisam (yellow card) 60'; Díaz (yellow card) 90' | Report | Naocha (yellow card) 80'; Mondal (yellow card) 89' | Stadium: Tilak Maidan Stadium; Attendance: 0 Referee: Aditya Purkayastha; Man of the Match: Lalthathanga Khawlhring (Kerala Blasters) |

| 22 February 2022 18 | Mumbai City | 1–0 | East Bengal | Margao, Goa |
| 19:30 IST | Bipin 51' | Report | | Stadium: Fatorda Stadium; Attendance: 0 Referee: Ashwin |

| 28 February 2022 19 | East Bengal | 1–1 | NorthEast United | Vasco da Gama, Goa |
| 19:30 IST | Perošević 55' | Report | Khan (yellow card) 24'; Sahanek 45'; Diallo (yellow card) 58' | Stadium: Tilak Maidan Stadium; Attendance: 0 Referee: Tejas Nagvenkar |

| 5 March 2022 20 | East Bengal | 0–1 | Bengaluru | Vasco da Gama, Goa |
| 19:30 IST | Naocha (yellow card) 90' | Report | Chhetri 24' | Stadium: Tilak Maidan Stadium; Attendance: 0 Referee: Senthil Nathan; Man of the Match: Lara Sharma (Bengaluru) |

== Statistics ==
=== Appearances ===
As of 5 March 2022

Appearances for East Bengal in 2021–22 season
| No. | Pos. | Nat. | Name | ISL | | Total | |
| No. | Pos. | Nat. | Name | Apps | Starts | Apps | Starts |
Goalkeepers
| 1 | GK | (India) | Sankar Roy | 5 | 5 | 5 | 5 |
| 25 | GK | (India) | Suvam Sen | 5 | 4 | 5 | 4 |
| 29 | GK | (India) | Arindam Bhattacharya | 11 | 11 | 11 | 11 |
Defenders
| 2 | CB | (India) | Daniel Gomes | 2 | 1 | 2 | 1 |
| ~~4~~ | CB | (Australia) | Tomislav Mrcela (Note: Released mid-way into the season.) | 9 | 8 | 9 | 8 |
| 5 | CB | (India) | Adil Khan | 14 | 8 | 14 | 8 |
| 12 | CB | (India) | Joyner Lourenco | 11 | 9 | 11 | 9 |
| 20 | LB | (India) | Hira Mondal | 16 | 15 | 16 | 15 |
| 30 | CB | (Nepal) | Ananta Tamang | 1 | 1 | 1 | 1 |
| 47 | CB/RB | (India) | Raju Gaikwad | 12 | 8 | 12 | 8 |
| 50 | LB | (India) | Naocha Singh | 5 | 4 | 5 | 4 |
| 55 | RB | (India) | Ankit Mukherjee | 6 | 4 | 6 | 4 |
| 71 | CB/LB | (Croatia) | Franjo Prce | 15 | 15 | 15 | 15 |
Midfielders
| 6 | DM | (Netherlands) | Darren Sidoel | 10 | 8 | 10 | 8 |
| 8 | CM | (India) | Mohammed Rafique | 16 | 12 | 16 | 12 |
| 10 | RW | (India) | Jackichand Singh | 6 | 0 | 6 | 0 |
| 14 | CM | (India) | Wahengbam Angousana | 15 | 9 | 15 | 9 |
| 16 | LW | (India) | Songpu Singsit | 1 | 0 | 1 | 0 |
| 18 | CM | (India) | Sourav Das | 18 | 16 | 18 | 16 |
| ~~21~~ | CM | (Slovenia) | Amir Dervišević | 8 | 4 | 8 | 4 |
| 22 | DM | (India) | Lalrinliana Hnamte | 17 | 12 | 17 | 12 |
| 23 | LW | (India) | Bikash Jairu | 11 | 6 | 11 | 6 |
| 77 | CM | (Spain) | Fran Sota | 5 | 3 | 5 | 3 |
| 80 | DM | (India) | Amarjit Singh Kiyam | 16 | 10 | 16 | 10 |
Forwards
| 7 | FW | (Croatia) | Antonio Perošević | 14 | 13 | 14 | 13 |
| 9 | FW | (Brazil) | Marcelo Ribeiro | 6 | 3 | 6 | 3 |
| 11 | FW | (India) | Subha Ghosh | 3 | 1 | 3 | 1 |
| 13 | FW | (India) | Naorem Mahesh Singh | 18 | 15 | 18 | 15 |
| 15 | FW | (India) | Balwant Singh | 5 | 0 | 5 | 0 |
| 24 | FW | (India) | Thongkhosiem Haokip | 12 | 7 | 12 | 7 |
| ~~27~~ | FW | (Nigeria) | Daniel Chima Chukwu | 10 | 7 | 10 | 7 |
| 43 | FW | (India) | Siddhant Shirodkar | 1 | 0 | 1 | 0 |
| 99 | FW | (India) | Rahul Paswan | 1 | 1 | 1 | 1 |

=== Goal scorers ===
As of 5 March 2022

| Rank | No. | Pos. | Nat. | Name | ISL | Total |
|---|---|---|---|---|---|---|
| 1 | 7 | FW | (Croatia) | Antonio Perosevic | 4 | 4 |
| 2 | 6 | DM | (Netherlands) | Darren Sidoel | 3 | 3 |
| 3 | 13 | FW | (India) | Naorem Mahesh Singh | 2 | 2 |
| 3 | ~~21~~ | MF | (Slovenia) | Amir Dervisevic | 2 | 2 |
| 3 | 24 | FW | (India) | Thongkhosiem Haokip | 2 | 2 |
| 3 | ~~27~~ | FW | (Nigeria) | Daniel Chima Chukwu | 2 | 2 |
| 7 | ~~4~~ | CB | (Australia) | Tomislav Mrcela | 1 | 1 |
| 7 | 22 | DM | (India) | Lalrinliana Hnamte | 1 | 1 |
| 7 | 71 | CB/LB | (Croatia) | Franjo Prce | 1 | 1 |
| Total | | | | | 18 | 18 |

=== Assists ===
As of 5 March 2022

| Rank | No. | Pos. | Nat. | Name | ISL | Total |
|---|---|---|---|---|---|---|
| 1 | 14 | MF | (India) | Wahengbam Angousana | 2 | 2 |
| 2 | 7 | FW | (Croatia) | Antonio Perošević | 1 | 1 |
| 2 | 8 | MF | (India) | Mohammed Rafique | 1 | 1 |
| 2 | 24 | FW | (India) | Thongkhosiem Haokip | 1 | 1 |
| 2 | 47 | CB/RB | (India) | Raju Gaikwad | 1 | 1 |
| 2 | 77 | CB/LB | (Croatia) | Franjo Prce | 1 | 1 |

=== Clean sheets ===
As of 5 March 2022

| No. | Nat. | Player | ISL | Total |
|---|---|---|---|---|
| 25 | (India) | Suvam Sen | 2 | 2 |
| 29 | (India) | Arindam Bhattacharya | 1 | 1 |

=== Disciplinary record ===
As of 5 March 2022

| No. | Pos. | Nat. | Name | ISL | | | | Remarks |
| No. | Pos. | Nat. | Name | Booked | (yellow card) (red card) | (yellow card) (yellow-red card) | Sent off (straight red) | Remarks |
|---|---|---|---|---|---|---|---|---|
| 5 | CB | (India) | Adil Khan | 1 | 0 | 0 | 0 | |
| 6 | DM | (Netherlands) | Darren Sidoel | 1 | 0 | 0 | 0 | |
| 7 | FW | (Croatia) | Antonio Perošević | 2 | 0 | 0 | 1 | Received a five-match ban for the red card against NorthEast United on 17 December 2021. Missed the game against Hyderabad on 23 December 2021. Missed the game against Bengaluru on 4 January 2022. Missed the game against Mumbai City on 7 January 2022. Missed the game against Jamshedpur on 11 January 2022. Missed the game against Goa on 19 January 2022. |
| 13 | FW | (India) | Naorem Mahesh Singh | 2 | 0 | 0 | 0 | |
| 15 | FW | (India) | Balwant Singh | 2 | 0 | 0 | 0 | |
| 18 | CM | (India) | Sourav Das | 2 | 0 | 0 | 0 | |
| 20 | LB | (India) | Hira Mondal | 4 | 0 | 0 | 0 | |
| 22 | DM | (India) | Lalrinliana Hnamte | 2 | 0 | 0 | 0 | |
| 24 | FW | (India) | Thongkhosiem Haokip | 1 | 0 | 0 | 0 | |
| 29 | GK | (India) | Arindam Bhattacharya | 1 | 0 | 0 | 0 | |
| 47 | CB/RB | (India) | Raju Gaikwad | 1 | 0 | 0 | 0 | |
| 50 | LB | (India) | Naocha Singh | 2 | 0 | 0 | 0 | |
| 55 | RB | (India) | Ankit Mukherjee | 2 | 0 | 0 | 0 | |
| 80 | DM | (India) | Amarjit Singh Kiyam | 1 | 0 | 0 | 0 | |

== Club awards ==
=== ISL Fans' Goal of the Week award ===
This is awarded weekly to the player chosen by fans voting at the Indian Super League website.

| Week | Nat. | Player | Score | Opponents | Date | % Votes |
|---|---|---|---|---|---|---|
| Week 3 | (Netherlands) | Darren Sidoel | 0–1 | Odisha | 30 November 2021 | 38.3% |
| Week 5 | (Croatia) | Antonio Perošević | 1–1 | Goa | 7 December 2021 | 49.5% |
| Week 13 | (India) | Naorem Mahesh Singh | 0–1 | Goa | 25 January 2022 | 38.5% |
| Week 15 | (Netherlands) | Darren Sidoel | 1–2 | Chennaiyin | 2 February 2022 | 57.2% |

== See also ==
- 2021–22 in Indian football
