= List of 2022–23 Indian Super League transfers =

2022–23 Indian Super League transfers
- Season: 2022–23 Indian Super League season

This is a list of Indian football transfers for the 2022–23 Indian Super League. The list includes both pre-season and mid-season transfers.

== Transfers ==
All players and clubs without a flag are Indian.

=== Pre-season ===
Date	Name	Moving from	Moving to	Ref.
11 April 2022	(Spain) Jorge Ortiz	Goa	(China) Sichuan Jiuniu	
18 April 2022	(Spain) Hernán Santana	NorthEast United	(China) Sichuan Jiuniu	
21 April 2022	(Spain) Edu García	Hyderabad	(China) Sichuan Jiuniu	
27 April 2022	Lalrinliana Hnamte	East Bengal	ATK Mohun Bagan	
30 April 2022	Mobashir Rahman	Jamshedpur	East Bengal	
28 May 2022	Michael Soosairaj	ATK Mohun Bagan	Odisha	
1 June 2022	Narender Gahlot	Jamshedpur	Odisha	
1 June 2022	Alexander Romario Jesuraj	Goa	Chennaiyin	
1 June 2022	Vincy Barretto	Kerala Blasters	Chennaiyin	
1 June 2022	Monotosh Chakladar	Madan Maharaj	Chennaiyin	
9 June 2022	Sourav Das	East Bengal	Chennaiyin	
11 June 2022	Gurmukh Singh	Rajasthan United	Chennaiyin	
15 June 2022	Bryce Miranda	Churchill Brothers	Kerala Blasters	
16 June 2022	Mohammed Rafique	East Bengal	Chennaiyin	
19 June 2022	(Spain) Carlos Delgado	(Spain) Atlético Baleares	Odisha	
20 June 2022	Asish Rai	Hyderabad	ATK Mohun Bagan	
20 June 2022	Ashique Kuruniyan	Bengaluru	ATK Mohun Bagan	
20 June 2022	(Australia) Osama Malik	(Australia) Perth Glory	Odisha	
21 June 2022	Aakash Sangwan	RoundGlass Punjab	Chennaiyin	
21 June 2022	Sajal Bag	BSS Sporting Club	Chennaiyin	
22 June 2022	(Spain) Javi Hernández	Odisha	Bengaluru	
22 June 2022	(Bosnia and Herzegovina) Enes Sipović	Kerala Blasters	(Kuwait) Al-Jahra	
24 June 2022	(Spain) Álvaro Vázquez	Kerala Blasters	Goa	
26 June 2022	Raynier Fernandes	Mumbai City	Odisha (on loan)	
27 June 2022	(Senegal) Fallou Diagne	(Albania) Vllaznia Shkodër	Chennaiyin	
29 June 2022	(Iran) Vafa Hakhamaneshi	Unattached	Chennaiyin	
1 July 2022	(Syria) Fares Arnaout	(Bahrain) Manama Club	Goa	
2 July 2022	(Brazil) Diego Maurício	Mumbai City	Odisha	
2 July 2022	(Ghana) Kwame Karikari	(Thailand) Nakhon Ratchasima	Chennaiyin	
6 July 2022	Denechandra Meitei	Kerala Blasters	Odisha (on loan)	
6 July 2022	(Croatia) Petar Slišković	(Germany) SV Wehen Wiesbaden	Chennaiyin	
7 July 2022	(Spain) Saúl Crespo	(Spain) Ponferradina	Odisha	
8 July 2022	(Australia) Apostolos Giannou	(Australia) Macarthur FC	Kerala Blasters	
8 July 2022	(Spain) Iker Guarrotxena	(Spain) Logroñés	Goa	
8 July 2022	(Spain) Pedro Martín	(Spain) Gimnàstic	Odisha	
10 July 2022	(Australia) Rostyn Griffiths	(Australia) Melbourne City	Mumbai City	
12 July 2022	(Spain) Víctor Rodríguez	Unattached	Odisha	
13 July 2022	(Spain) Victor Mongil	Odisha	Kerala Blasters	
14 July 2022	Sanjeev Stalin	Kerala Blsters	Mumbai City	
16 July 2022	(Spain) Alberto Noguera	Goa	Mumbai City	
18 July 2022	(Ukraine) Ivan Kalyuzhnyi	(Ukraine) Oleksandriya	Kerala Blasters (on loan)	
18 July 2022	(Australia) Dimitri Petratos	(Saudi Arabia) Al Wehda	ATK Mohun Bagan	
18 July 2022	(Fiji) Roy Krishna	ATK Mohun Bagan	Bengaluru	
19 July 2022	(Scotland) Greg Stewart	Jamshedpur	Mumbai City	
19 July 2022	(Morocco) Noah Sadaoui	(Morocco) AS FAR	Goa	
20 July 2022	(Germany) Julius Düker	(Germany) TSV Havelse	Chennaiyin	
20 July 2022	(Argentina) Jorge Pereyra Díaz	(Argentina) Platense	Mumbai City	
22 July 2022	(Spain) Odei Onaindia	(Spain) Mirandés	Hyderabad	
22 July 2022	(Australia) Aleksandar Jovanovic	(Australia) Macarthur FC	Bengaluru	
27 July 2022	(Spain) Marc Valiente	(Spain) Sporting Gijón	Goa	
28 July 2022	Ajith Kumar	Bengaluru	Chennaiyin	
29 July 2022	(Spain) Borja Herrera	(Spain) Tamaraceite	Hyderabad	
2 August 2022	(Brazil) Wellington Priori	(Thailand) Chainat Hornbill	Jamshedpur	
3 August 2022	Pawan Kumar	Jamshedpur	East Bengal	
3 August 2022	Mohammad Rakip	Mumbai City	East Bengal	
3 August 2022	Sarthak Golui	Bengaluru	East Bengal	
3 August 2022	Jerry Lalrinzuala	Chennaiyin	East Bengal	
3 August 2022	Souvik Chakrabarti	Hyderabad	East Bengal	
3 August 2022	Aniket Jadhav	Hyderabad	East Bengal	
3 August 2022	Naorem Mahesh Singh	Kerala Blasters	East Bengal	
3 August 2022	Amarjit Singh Kiyam	Goa	East Bengal (on loan)	
4 August 2022	Rakshit Dagar	Gokulam Kerala	Jamshedpur	
4 August 2022	Sheikh Sahil	ATK Mohun Bagan	Jamshedpur	
6 August 2022	(Bhutan) Chencho Gyeltshen	Kerala Blasters	(Bhutan) Paro	
8 August 2022	Germanpreet Singh	Chennaiyin	Jamshedpur	
10 August 2022	(Australia) Harry Sawyer	(Australia) South Melbourne	Jamshedpur	
11 August 2022	Lalchungnunga	Sreenidi Deccan	East Bengal (on loan)	
11 August 2022	Kamaljit Singh	Odisha	East Bengal	
11 August 2022	Sumeet Passi	RoundGlass Punjab	East Bengal	
12 August 2022	(England) Jay Emmanuel-Thomas	(Scotland) Aberdeen	Jamshedpur	
12 August 2022	(Cyprus) Charalambos Kyriakou	(Cyprus) Doxa Katokopias	East Bengal	
12 August 2022	(Spain) Iván Garrido	Goa	East Bengal	
12 August 2022	(Brazil) Alex	Jamshedpur	East Bengal	
12 August 2022	(Brazil) Cleiton Silva	Bengaluru	East Bengal	
12 August 2022	(Brazil) Eliandro	Unattached	East Bengal	
14 August 2022	Sandesh Jhingan	ATK Mohun Bagan	Bengaluru	
17 August 2022	Bidyashagar Singh	Bengaluru	Kerala Blasters (on loan)	
17 August 2022	Debnath Mondal	East Bengal	ATK Mohun Bagan	
18 August 2022	Jithin MS	Gokulam Kerala	NorthEast United	

=== Mid-season ===
Date	Name	Moving from	Moving to	Ref.
23 October 2022	(Nigeria) Sylvester Igboun	NorthEast United	Unattached	
29 October 2022	(India) Suvam Sen	Unattached	East Bengal	
8 November 2022	(India) Lalhmangaihsanga Ralte	Goa	Kenkre	
10 November 2022	(India) Halen Nongtdu	Indian Arrows	Mumbai City	
21 November 2022	(Colombia) Wilmar Jordán	Unattached	NorthEast United	
21 November 2022	(India) Hira Mondal	Bengaluru	Unattached	
5 December 2022	(Spain) Pablo Pérez	Unattached	Bengaluru	
6 December 2022	(Brazil) Wellington Priori	Jamshedpur	Unattached	
7 December 2022	(Brazil) Rafael Crivellaro	Chennaiyin	Jamshedpur	
21 December 2022	(Montenegro) Slavko Damjanović	(Serbia) Novi Pazar	ATK Mohun Bagan	
29 December 2022	(India) Puitea	Kerala Blasters	ATK Mohun Bagan	

== See also ==
- Indian Super League
- 2022–23 Indian Super League
