= Rahul Paswan =

Indian footballer

Personal information
- Full name: Rahul Kumar Paswan
- Date of birth: 19 April 1998 (age 28)
- Place of birth: West Bengal, India
- Position: Striker

Team information
- Current team: Diamond Harbour
- Number: 99

Youth career
- United SC

Senior career*
Years	Team	Apps	(Gls)
2020	ARA	4	(0)
2020–2021	Kalighat MS	0	(0)
2021–2022	BSS	7	(6)
2022	East Bengal	1	(0)
2022–2023	Mohammedan	0	(0)
2023–	Diamond Harbour	4	(3)
- * Club domestic league appearances and goals as of 19:30, 18 July 2023 (UTC)

Rahul Kumar Paswan (Bengali: রাহুল কুমার পাসোয়ান; born 19 April 1998) is an Indian professional footballer who plays as a forward for Calcutta Football League club Diamond Harbour.

== Club career ==
=== East Bengal ===
In January 2022, East Bengal announced the signing Paswan for the remainder of the Indian Super League season. He made his only appearance on 14 February, in a 1–0 loss against Kerala Blasters.

=== Mohammedan ===
In June 2022, Paswan joined I-League club Mohammedan. On 16 August, he made his debut for the club against Goa in the Durand Cup, which ended in a 3–1 comeback win. Eleven days later, he scored his first goal for the club against Indian Air Force, in a 2–0 win. Paswan executed a wonderful spot jump from a Marcus Joseph cross to nail a header into the back of the goal.

== Career statistics ==
=== Club ===
As of 27 August 2022

Club	Season	League			Cup		AFC		Total	
Club	Season	Division	Apps	Goals	Apps	Goals	Apps	Goals	Apps	Goals
ARA	2020	I-League 2nd Division	4	0	0	0	–		4	0
East Bengal	2021–22	Indian Super League	1	0	0	0	–		1	0
Mohammedan	2022–23	I-League	0	0	2 (Note: Appearance(s) in Durand Cup)	1	–		2	1
Career total			5	0	2	1	0	0	7	1
