= Shameel Chembakath =

Indian football manager and former player

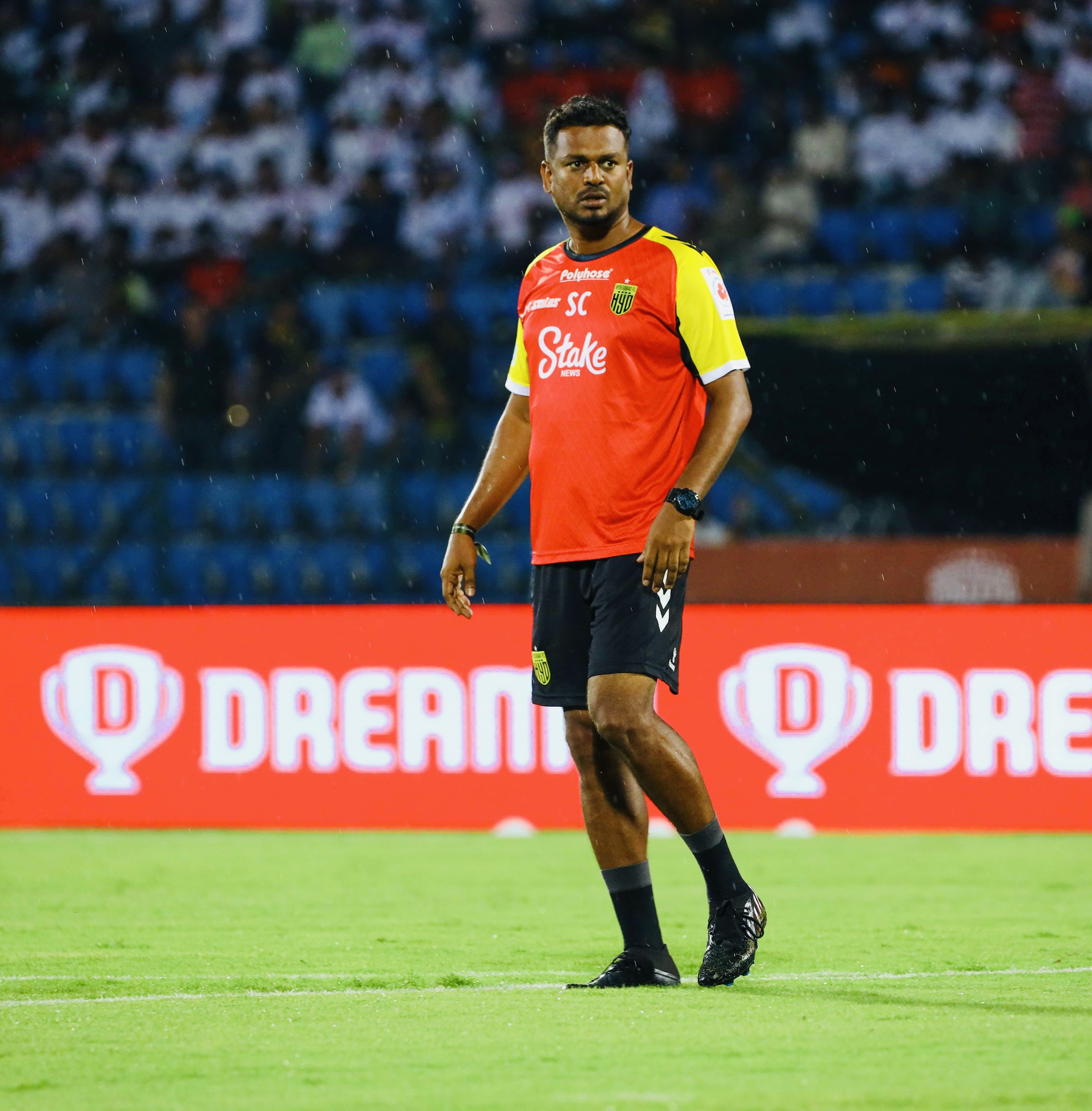
- Shameel Chembakath with Hyderabad FC in 2021

Personal information
- Full name: Shameel Chembakath
- Date of birth: 12 January 1986 (age 40)
- Place of birth: Malappuram, Kerala, India
- Height: 1.85 m (6 ft 1 in)
- Positions: Centre back; right back

Team information
- Current team: FC Goa (Assistant Coach)

Youth career
- 1998–2004: SAIL Academy

Senior career*
Years	Team	Apps	(Gls)
2004–2005	Viva Kerala		
2005–2007	Vasco SC		
2007–2008	Mohammedan		
2008–2009	Bengal Mumbai		

Managerial career
- 2014–2016: Prodigy Academy
- 2016–2017: Muthoot Academy
- 2017–2019: Kerala Blasters U-15
- 2019–2020: Kerala Blasters Reserves (assistant)
- 2020–2022: Hyderabad Reserves / U-18
- 2022–2024: Hyderabad (assistant)
- 2024–2025: Hyderabad (interim)
- 2025–2026: RFYC (U-19)
- 2026–: FC Goa (assistant)
- * Club domestic league appearances and goals

Shameel Chembakath (born 12 January 1986) is an Indian football manager and former professional player who played as a defender. He is currently the assistant coach of FC Goa. He previously served as the head coach of Reliance Foundation Young Champs U-19. and head coach of Hyderabad FC in the Indian Super League.

After retiring from football at an early age due to injury, he started coaching career with under-15 team of Kerala Blasters in 2017.

== Playing career ==
Shameel started his youth career in Jharkhand by playing for the SAIL football academy in 1998. He signed first professional contract with Viva Kerala in 2004. Shameel spent one year with Viva Kerala before signing for Vasco Sports Club Goa. In 2007, he was signed by the Kolkata based club Mohammedan S.C.. During time with Mohammedan, he suffered hamstring injury. In 2008, Bengal Mumbai FC signed Shameel. He had been called for India national football team camp in 2007 for the Olympic qualifier competitions, but did not qualify to the final squad. He was forced to retire in 2009, aged just 23, after failing to recover from the long-term hamstring injury.

== Coaching career ==
Shameel worked as head coach of different schools across Kerala. It was in 2014 that he joined Prodigy Football Academy, which ran in partnership with Kerala Blasters Football Schools. In 2016, Shameel signed for Muthoot Football Academy. He got the AFC B Coaching License in 2017. In the same year, Kerala Blasters decided to field their youth teams in the Hero Elite League and Shameel was appointed as the U15 head coach. His first accomplishment came during the 2018–19 Juniors League as the U15 side of the Blasters reached the semi-finals of the tournament. Later that year, he got the AFC A license. Shameel also worked with the reserve team of Kerala Blasters and is known for the development of players like Sahal Abdul Samad and Mohammad Rakip. The reserve side won the 2019–2020 season of the Kerala Premier League, making it Shameel's first coaching title. He also got chance to work as the assistant of the Kerala Blasters senior team towards the end of the 2018–2019 regular season. He left Kerala Blasters in 2020.

On 2 January 2021, it was announced that Shameel had signed a three-year deal with Hyderabad FC as the head coach of their reserve team. On 6 May 2022, he was promoted as the assistant coach of the senior team. On November 14, 2024, he was awarded the AFC Pro License, the highest coaching certification granted by the Asian Football Confederation. Shameel was appointed as the interim coach of Hyderabad on 17 December 2024, following the club's decision to part ways with Thangboi Singto. On January 23, 2025, Shameel Chembakath led Hyderabad to their first home win of the season. This also marked his first-ever win as a coach in the ISL. On 15 June 2025, Chembakath was appointed as the head coach of the Reliance Foundation Young Champs under-19 team. His tenure with the reliance ended on 31 May 2026. In July 2026, Chembakath joined FC Goa as an assistant coach for the 2026–27 season.

== Coaching statistics ==
As of 12 June 2026

Team	From	To	Record				
Team	From	To	G	W	D	L	Win %
Kerala Blasters Under 15	2017	2020	36	22	4	10	61.1
Kerala Blasters Reserves	2018	2020	48	30	4	14	62.5
Hyderabad FC II (Head Coach)	2020	2022	15	7	2	6	46.6
Hyderabad FC (Assistant)	2022	2024	65	22	10	33	34.4
Hyderabad FC (Head Coach)	2024	2025	13	2	5	6	16.7
Reliance Foundation Young Champs (Head Coach)	2025	2026	29	16	6	7	55.2
FC Goa (Assistant)	2026	Present	8	2	2	4	25.0

== Honours ==
=== As a manager ===
- Kerala Premier League: 2019–20: Winner
- 5th CEM Gold Cup: Runner-up
- 3rd place, Reliance Foundation Development League: 2022
- Indian Super League: Semi-finalists 2022–23
- Indian Super League: 2nd place 2022–23 (League Stage)
- Runner-Up – FC Madras Elite Cup U-18: 2025
- Third place – 2025–26 Mumbai Premier League
- Fair Play Award – 2025–26 Mumbai Premier League

=== As a player ===
- Winner: Subroto Cup: 1998, SAIL - Bokaro Ispat Vidyalaya
- Winner: Independence Day Cup (Assam): 2007
