= Lalrinliana Hnamte =

Indian footballer (born 2003)

Personal information
- Date of birth: 29 April 2003 (age 23)
- Place of birth: Mizoram, India
- Height: 1.77 m (5 ft 9 1/2 in)
- Position: Midfielder

Team information
- Current team: SC Delhi
- Number: 4

Youth career
- FC Pune City Reserves

Senior career*
Years	Team	Apps	(Gls)
2021–2022	East Bengal	17	(1)
2022–2024	Mohun Bagan SG	26	(0)
2024–2026	Chennaiyin	34	(1)
2026–	SC Delhi	3	(1)

International career^{‡}
2025–	India U23	10	(0)
2024–	India	1	(0)
- * Club domestic league appearances and goals as of 28 October 2026 ‡ National team caps and goals as of 22:44, 28 March 2026 (UTC)

Lalrinliana Hnamte (born 29 April 2003) is an Indian professional footballer who plays as a midfielder for Indian Super League club SC Delhi and the India national team.

== Career ==
Lalrinliana Hnamte joined Pune City FC U-18 team, in 2018 and took part in the 2018 Hero I-League U-18. Then he moved to the Hyderabad FC reserves team and was with them till September 2021, before joining the East Bengal. He made his Indian Super League debut for East Bengal on 21 November 2021, against Jamshedpur FC. He scored his first ISL goal against Chennaiyin FC in their 2–2 draw on 2 February 2022.

On 26 April 2022, it was announced by Mohun Bagan, the arch rivals of East Bengal, that he is going to play for them from the upcoming 2022–23 season, signing a contract of 2 years.

== Career statistics ==
=== Club ===
As of 15 April 2024

Club	Season	League			Super Cup		Durand Cup		AFC		Other		Total	
Club	Season	Division	Apps	Goals	Apps	Goals	Apps	Goals	Apps	Goals	Apps	Goals	Apps	Goals
Hyderabad B	2019–20	I-League 2	0	0	–								0	0
East Bengal	2021–22	Indian Super League	17	1	0	0	–		–		–		17	1
Mohun Bagan	2022–23	Indian Super League	13	0	2	0	3	0	–		1 (Note: Appearance in Indian club qualifiers for 2023–24 AFC competitions)	0	19	0
Mohun Bagan	2023–24	Indian Super League	13	0	0	0	2	1	3 (Note: Appearance(s) in AFC Cup)	0	9 (Note: Appearances in Calcutta Football League)	3	27	4
Mohun Bagan	Total		26	0	2	0	5	1	3	0	10	3	46	4
Chennaiyin	2024–25	Indian Super League	19	1	0	0	–		–		–		19	1
Career total			62	2	2	0	5	1	3	0	10	3	82	6

== Honours ==
Mohun Bagan

- Indian Super League: 2022–23
