= Marcelo Ribeiro (footballer) =

Brazilian football player

Personal information
- Full name: Marcelo Ribeiro dos Santos
- Date of birth: 27 July 1997 (age 29)
- Place of birth: Santo André, Brazil
- Height: 1.87 m (6 ft 1 1/2 in)
- Position: Striker

Team information
- Current team: Antequera
- Number: 9

Senior career*
Years	Team	Apps	(Gls)
2019	Portuguesa Santista	0	(0)
2019–2021	Burgos	15	(4)
2020–2021	→ Sanse (loan)	24	(9)
2021–2022	Gil Vicente	3	(0)
2022	→ East Bengal (loan)	6	(0)
2022–2024	San Fernando	43	(4)
2024–	Antequera	39	(7)
- * Club domestic league appearances and goals as of 10 June 2026

Marcelo Ribeiro dos Santos, known as Marcelo Ribeiro or simply Marcelo (born 27 July 1997), is a Brazilian professional footballer who plays as a forward for Spanish club Antequera.

== Club career ==
On 6 August 2021, he joined Gil Vicente in Portugal on a two-year contract.

He made his Primeira Liga debut for Gil Vicente on 15 August 2021 in a game against Portimonense.

On 10 January 2022, he joined Indian Super League club SC East Bengal on loan from Gil Vicente.

== Career statistics ==
=== Club ===
As of 5 March 2022

Club	Season	League			Cup		Continental		Total	
Club	Season	Division	Apps	Goals	Apps	Goals	Apps	Goals	Apps	Goals
Burgos	2019–20	Segunda División B	15	4	1 (Note: Appearance(s) in Copa Federación de España)	0	–		16	4
SS Reyes (loan)	2020–21	Segunda División B	24	9	0	0	–		24	9
Gil Vicente	2021–22	Primeira Liga	3	0	0	0	–		3	0
East Bengal (loan)	2021–22	Indian Super League	6	0	0	0	–		6	0
Career total			48	13	1	0	0	0	49	13
