= Nongdamba Singh Naorem =

Indian footballer (born 2000)

Nongdamba Singh
Personal information
- Full name: Nongdamba Singh Naorem
- Date of birth: 2 January 2000 (age 26)
- Place of birth: Wabagai, Manipur, India
- Height: 1.70 m (5 ft 7 in)
- Position: Winger

Team information
- Current team: United Kolkata SC
- Number: 16

Youth career
- 2015–2016: DSK Shivajians
- 2016–2017: Minerva Punjab

Senior career*
Years	Team	Apps	(Gls)
2017–2018	Minerva Punjab	2	(0)
2017–2018	→ Indian Arrows (loan)	11	(1)
2018–2019	Kerala Blasters B	6	(1)
2019–2020	→ Mohun Bagan (loan)	16	(2)
2020–2021	Kerala Blasters	3	(0)
2021	→ Mohun Bagan SG (loan)	0	(0)
2021–2023	Goa	12	(0)
2023	Mohun Bagan SG	0	(0)
2023–2024	Jamshedpur	8	(0)
2024	Malappuram		
2025	United Kolkata SC		

International career^{‡}
2017	India U17	6	(1)
2017	India U20	3	(0)
- * Club domestic league appearances and goals ‡ National team caps and goals as of 25 March 2020

Nongdamba Singh Naorem (Meitei: Naorem Nongdamba Singh, born 2 January 2000) is an Indian professional footballer who plays as a winger for Calcutta Football League club United Kolkata SC. He also represented India in the FIFA U-17 World Cup in 2017.

== Club career ==
=== Youth and early career ===
Born in Wabagai, Manipur, Nongdamba Naorem was part of the Minerva Punjab youth team. After the FIFA U-17 World Cup, Nongdamba Naorem was selected to play for the Indian Arrows, an All India Football Federation-owned team that would consist of India under-20 players to give them playing time, on loan from Minerva Punjab. He made his professional debut for the side in the Arrow's first match of the season against Chennai City. He came on as an 86th-minute substitute for Edmund Lalrindika as Indian Arrows won 3–0.

A month later, on 26 December, Naorem scored the first professional goal of his career against Shillong Lajong. Nongdamba Neorem took the ball on the wing, proceeded to beat three Shillong Lajong defenders to get into the box, and then went past one more defender before slotting the ball home past the goalkeeper as Indian Arrows won 3–0.

=== Kerala Blasters ===
In 2018 he was signed by Kerala Blasters on a three-year deal. He then became the part of the reserve team of the Blasters that competes in the I-League 2nd Division. After making 6 appearances there, he was loaned to Mohun Bagan for getting some playing time.

==== Mohun Bagan (loan) ====
Naorem was one of the key member of Mohun Bagan's I-League winning campaign under Kibu Vicuna. He made 16 appearances for the Mariners and also scored two important goals. The deal was done with the swap of Subha Ghosh from Mohun Bagan SG.

==== Return to the Blasters ====
In 2020, Kibu Vicuna took over the manager role at Kerala Blasters. He then also brought back Naorem from Mohun Bagan. He made his debut for the Blasters against Mohun Bagan SG on 20 November 2020 which ended 1–0 in favour of Mohun Bagan SG.

=== Mohun Bagan SG ===
On 29 December 2020, Mohun Bagan SG announced that they have signed Naorem from the Blasters on an undisclosed transfer fee plus the swap of Subha Ghosh.

=== FC Goa ===
On 26 June 2021, FC Goa signed a deal with the midfielder Nongdamba Naorem.

== International career ==
Naorem scored the equalizer for India U-17 vs Chile U-17 in a friendly match in Mexico before the FIFA U-17 World Cup in India. Naorem went on to represent the India under-17 side, that participated in the 2017 FIFA U-17 World Cup.

== Career statistics ==
As of 25 March 2020

Club	Season	League			Cup		Continental		Total	
Club	Season	Division	Apps	Goals	Apps	Goals	Apps	Goals	Apps	Goals
Minerva Punjab	2017–18	I-League	2	0	0	0	—	—	2	0
Indian Arrows (loan)	2017–18	I-League	11	1	0	0	—	—	11	1
Kerala Blasters B	2018–19	I-League 2nd Division	6	1	0	0	—	—	6	1
Mohun Bagan (loan)	2019–20	I-League	16	2	0	0	—	—	16	2
Kerala Blasters	2020-21	Indian Super League	3	0					3	0
Career total			38	4	0	0	0	0	38	4

=== International (Youth) ===
Team	Apps	Goals
India U-17	6	1
India U-20	3	0
Career total	9	1

== Honours ==
Mohun Bagan

- Durand Cup: 2023
- I-League: 2019–20
