= Subha Ghosh =

Indian footballer (born 2000)

Personal information
- Full name: Subha Ghosh
- Date of birth: 22 December 2000 (age 25)
- Place of birth: Kolkata, West Bengal, India
- Height: 1.74 m (5 ft 8 1/2 in)
- Positions: Striker; winger

Team information
- Current team: Police AC

Youth career
- United
- Mohun Bagan

Senior career*
Years	Team	Apps	(Gls)
2019–2020	Mohun Bagan	8	(3)
2020	ATK Mohun Bagan		
2021–2022	Kerala Blasters		
2021–2022	→ East Bengal (loan)	3	(0)
2022–2025	Gokulam Kerala (R)		
2025-	Police AC		
- * Club domestic league appearances and goals

Subha Ghosh (Bengali: শুভ ঘোষ; born 22 December 2000) is an Indian professional footballer who plays as a forward for Police AC.

== Club career ==
=== Early career ===
A product of Mohun Bagan's academy, Ghosh made his competitive debut for the first-team on 17 August 2019 in Bagan's 2019 Durand Cup match against Indian Navy. He started the match as Mohun Bagan won 1–0. Ghosh then made his professional debut for the club on 8 December 2019 in the I-League against Churchill Brothers. He came on as a 71st-minute substitute for Nongdamba Naorem and scored his first professional goal in the 90th minute as Mohun Bagan was defeated 2–4. In the next match, Ghosh scored his second career goal against TRAU. He came off the bench as a substitute for V.P. Suhair and scored Bagan's fourth goal in the first minute of stoppage time as they won 4–0.

Ghosh scored his third goal of the season and his career on 14 January 2020 against Punjab. His 88th-minute goal was the equalizer in a 1–1 draw for Mohun Bagan.

=== Kerala Blasters ===
On 29 December 2020, Kerala Blasters announced that they have signed Ghosh from ATK Mohun Bagan on a three-year contract. The deal also coordinated with the swap of Nongdamba Naorem, whom ATK Mohun Bagan signed on an undisclosed transfer fee. It was only in February 2021, the All India Football Federation's (AIFF) player status committee deemed Subha Ghosh’ transfer from ATK Mohun Bagan to Kerala Blasters as valid.

==== East Bengal (loan) ====
On 31 August 2021, Ghosh joined East Bengal on a season-long deal. He did not get more chances there and left the club after the loan period ended.

== Career statistics ==
As of 6 July 2022

Club	Season	League			Cup		Continental		Total	
Club	Season	Division	Apps	Goals	Apps	Goals	Apps	Goals	Apps	Goals
Mohun Bagan	2019–20	I-League	8	3	1 (Note: Appearance in the 2019 Durand Cup.)	0	—	—	9	3
Mohun Bagan	Mohun Bagan Total		8	3	1	0	0	0	9	3
ATK Mohun Bagan	2020–21	Indian Super League	0	0	0	0	—	—	0	0
Kerala Blasters	2020–21	Indian Super League	0	0	0	0	—	—	0	0
Kerala Blasters	2022–23	Indian Super League	0	0	0	0	—	—	0	0
Kerala Blasters	Kerala Blasters FC total		0	0	0	0	—	—	0	0
East Bengal (loan)	2021–22	Indian Super League	0	0	0	0	—	—	0	0
Career total			8	3	1	0	0	0	9	3

== Honours ==
Mohun Bagan

- Calcutta Football League: 2018–19
- I-League: 2019–20
