= Franjo Prce =

Croatian footballer (born 1996)

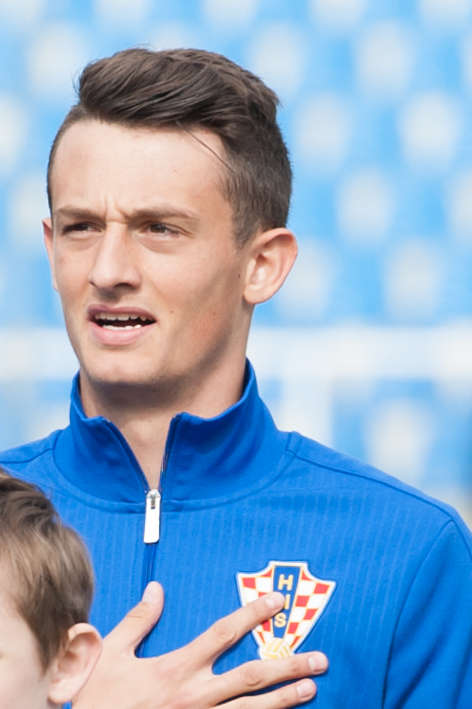
- Prce lining up with Croatia U19 in 2015

Personal information
- Date of birth: 7 January 1996 (age 30)
- Place of birth: Čapljina, Bosnia and Herzegovina
- Height: 1.85 m (6 ft 1 in)
- Position: Centre-back

Team information
- Current team: Atyrau
- Number: 71

Youth career
- 2006–2008: Omladinac Vranjic
- 2008–2014: Hajduk Split
- 2014–2015: Lazio

Senior career*
Years	Team	Apps	(Gls)
2015–2018	Lazio	1	(0)
2016	→ Salernitana (loan)	0	(0)
2017	→ Brescia (loan)	7	(0)
2018	→ Istra 1961 (loan)	16	(0)
2018–2019	Omonia	17	(1)
2019	Karpaty Lviv	0	(0)
2019–2020	Varaždin	8	(0)
2020–2021	Slaven Belupo	20	(1)
2021–2022	East Bengal	15	(1)
2022–2024	Koper	32	(1)
2024–2025	Spartak Varna	14	(0)
2025	Okzhetpes	13	(0)
2025–2026	Petrolul Ploiești	19	(0)
2026–	Atyrau	15	(0)

International career
2012	Croatia U16	7	(0)
2012–2013	Croatia U17	23	(1)
2013–2014	Croatia U18	3	(0)
2014–2015	Croatia U19	7	(0)
2017	Croatia U21	1	(0)
- * Club domestic league appearances and goals as of 1 November 2026

Franjo Prce (Croatian pronunciation: [frǎːɲo př̩ːtse]; born 7 January 1996) is a Croatian professional footballer who plays as a centre-back for Kazakhstan Premier League club Atyrau.

== Club career ==
Born in Čapljina, Bosnia and Herzegovina, Prce played with the youth academy of Croatian club Hajduk Split. However, after the club's reluctance to hand him a professional contract and instead used him in the reserve team, he refused to sign a contract extension proposal. On 16 August 2014, he moved to Italian club Lazio for € 300,000 and signed a professional contract. He featured 27 times for the Lazio Primavera during the 2014–15 season, with his team finishing runners-up to Torino in the Supercoppa Primavera. On 13 January 2016, he was loaned out to Salernitana.

On 23 October 2016, Prce made his first team debut for Lazio, replacing Felipe Anderson in a 2–2 draw against Torino in Serie A. On 12 January 2017, he joined Brescia on a loan deal till June 2018. After being used sparingly, he was recalled from his loan deal by his parent club.

On 31 January 2018, Prce moved to Croatian club Istra 1961 again on a loan deal. On 17 July 2018, he moved abroad and joined Cypriot club AC Omonia on a three-year contract. On 25 August, he made his debut, and also scored a goal in a 1–0 victory over Alki Oroklini.

On 15 September 2021, East Bengal announced that Prce had joined the Indian Super League club on a one-year deal. He made his debut on 21 November against Jamshedpur FC in a 1–1 draw.

== International career ==
Prce was included in the Croatian under-17 team for the 2013 UEFA European Under-17 Championship. He also featured for the team in the 2013 FIFA under-17 World Cup. On 18 March 2017, he was called to the Croatian under-21 team for a friendly match against Slovenia.

== Career statistics ==
As of 16 August 2026

Appearances and goals by club, season and competition
Club	Season	League			National cup (Note: Includes Croatian Cup, Slovenian Cup, Bulgarian Cup, Kazakhstan Cup)		Continental		Other		Total	
Club	Season	Division	Apps	Goals	Apps	Goals	Apps	Goals	Apps	Goals	Apps	Goals
Lazio	2015–16	Serie A	0	0	0	0	0	0	0	0	0	0
Lazio	2016–17	Serie A	1	0	0	0	—		—		1	0
Lazio	Total		1	0	0	0	0	0	0	0	1	0
Salernitana (loan)	2015–16	Serie B	0	0	—		—		—		0	0
Brescia (loan)	2016–17	Serie B	7	0	—		—		—		7	0
Istar 1961 (loan)	2017–18	Prva HNL	16	0	—		—		2 (Note: Appearance in Prva HNL promotion/relegation play-offs)	0	18	0
Omonia	2018–19	Cypriot First Division	17	1	2	1	—		—		19	2
Karpaty Lviv	2019–20	Ukrainian Premier League	0	0	0	0	—		—		0	0
Varaždin	2019–20	Prva HNL	8	0	2	0	—		—		10	0
Slaven Belupo	2020–21	Prva HNL	20	1	1	0	—		—		21	1
East Bengal	2021–22	Indian Super League	15	1	0	0	—		—		15	1
Koper	2022–23	Slovenian PrvaLiga	9	0	1	0	1 (Note: Appearance in UEFA Europa Conference League)	0	—		11	0
Koper	2023–24	Slovenian PrvaLiga	23	1	1	0	—		—		24	1
Koper	Total		32	1	2	0	1	0	—		35	1
Spartak Varna	2024–25	Bulgarian First League	14	0	0	0	—		—		14	0
Okzhetpes	2025	Kazakhstan Premier League	13	0	1	0	—		—		14	0
Petrolul Ploiești	2025–26	Liga I	19	0	2	0	—		—		21	0
Atyrau	2026	Kazakhstan Premier League	6	0	—		—		—		6	0
Career total			168	4	10	1	1	0	2	0	181	5
