= Daniel Gomes =

Indian footballer

Personal information
- Date of birth: 7 September 1997 (age 29)
- Place of birth: Goa, India
- Position: Centre-back

Team information
- Current team: Kenkre
- Number: 37

Youth career
- 2015–2018: Salgaocar U19

Senior career*
Years	Team	Apps	(Gls)
2018–2021	Salgaocar	10	(0)
2021–2022	East Bengal	2	(0)
2022–	Kenkre	2	(0)
- * Club domestic league appearances and goals as of 19:41, 28 March 2022 (UTC)

Daniel Gomes (born 7 September 1997), is an Indian professional footballer who plays as a defender for Kenkre in the I-League.

== Career ==
Daniel Gomes started his football career at the age 18, when he joined Salgaocar U-19 in 2015. Three years later, the defender was promoted to the senior team. He played ten matches in Goa Pro League and captained Salgaocar. In 2021, he joined the Indian Super League side. East Bengal for a year, at an undisclosed fee.

== Career statistics ==
=== Club ===
As of 28 March 2022

Club	Season	League			Cup		AFC		Total	
Club	Season	Division	Apps	Goals	Apps	Goals	Apps	Goals	Apps	Goals
East Bengal	2021–22	Indian Super League	2	0	0	0	–		2	0
Kenkre	2021–22	I-League	2	0	0	0	–		2	0
Career total			4	0	0	0	0	0	4	0
