= Hira Mondal =

Indian footballer

Hiram Mondal
Personal information
- Date of birth: 31 August 1996 (age 30)
- Place of birth: Kolkata, West Bengal, India
- Height: 1.74 m (5 ft 8 1/2 in)
- Position: Left back

Team information
- Current team: Mohammedan SC

Youth career
- East Bengal

Senior career*
Years	Team	Apps	(Gls)
2015	Calcutta Port Trust	19	(1)
2016	Rainbow AC	8	(1)
2017	Tollygunge Agragami	10	(0)
2018	Peerless	10	(1)
2018–2019	East Bengal	5	(0)
2019–2021	Mohammedan	22	(2)
2021–2022	East Bengal	16	(0)
2022	Bengaluru		
2023–2024	NorthEast United	7	(0)
2024–2026	East Bengal	2	
2026–present	Mohammedan		
- * Club domestic league appearances and goals as of 3 June 2024

Hira Mondal (Bengali: হীরা মন্ডল; born 31 August 1996) is an Indian professional footballer who plays as a defender for the Indian Super League club Mohammedan SC. He has represented West Bengal in the Santosh Trophy.

== Club career ==
=== Bengaluru ===
In July 2022, Mondal penned a two-year deal with Indian Super League club Bengaluru. On 17 August, he was sent-off on his debut against Jamshedpur in the Durand Cup, in a 2–1 win.

== Career statistics ==
=== Club ===
As of 15 January 2023

Club	Season	League			Cup		AFC		Total	
Club	Season	Division	Apps	Goals	Apps	Goals	Apps	Goals	Apps	Goals
Mohammedan	2019–20	I-League 2nd Division	8	0	1 (Note: Appearance(s) in Durand Cup)	0	–		9	0
Mohammedan	2020–21	I-League	14	2	0	0	–		14	2
Mohammedan	Mohammedan total		22	2	1	0	0	0	23	2
East Bengal	2021–22	Indian Super League	16	0	0	0	–		16	0
Bengaluru	2022–23	Indian Super League	0	0	4	0	–		4	0
NorthEast United	2022–23	Indian Super League	2	0	0	0	–		2	0
Career total			40	2	5	0	0	0	45	2

== Honours ==
East Bengal reserves

- GTA Governor's Gold Cup: 2018

Mohammedan Sporting

- I-League 2nd Division: 2019–20

Bengaluru

- Durand Cup: 2022
