= Sourav Das (footballer) =

Indian footballer

Personal information
- Full name: Sourav Das
- Date of birth: 20 June 1996 (age 30)
- Place of birth: Rishra, West Bengal
- Height: 1.73 m (5 ft 8 in)
- Position: Defensive midfielder

Youth career
- 2014–2016: Tata Football Academy

Senior career*
Years	Team	Apps	(Gls)
2016–2019	Mohun Bagan	15	(0)
2019–2021	Mumbai City	8	(0)
2021	→ East Bengal (loan)	3	(0)
2021–2022	East Bengal	18	(0)
2022–2024	Chennaiyin	8	(0)
2024-	Jamshedpur	30	(0)
- * Club domestic league appearances and goals as of 16:29, 13 December 2023 (UTC)

Sourav Das (Bengali: সৌরভ দাস; born 20 June 1996), is an Indian professional footballer who plays as a defensive midfielder for Jamshedpur in the Indian Super League.

== Career statistics ==
=== Club ===
As of 13 December 2023

Club	Season	League			Cup		AFC		Total	
Club	Season	Division	Apps	Goals	Apps	Goals	Apps	Goals	Apps	Goals
Mohun Bagan	2016–17	I-League	0	0	0	0	3 (Note: Appearance(s) in AFC Cup)	0	3	0
Mohun Bagan	2017–18	I-League	4	0	0	0	—		4	0
Mohun Bagan	2018–19	I-League	11	0	0	0	—		11	0
Mumbai City	2019–20	Indian Super League	7	0	0	0	—		7	0
Mumbai City	2020–21	Indian Super League	1	0	0	0	—		1	0
East Bengal (loan)	2020–21	Indian Super League	3	0	0	0	—		3	0
East Bengal	2021–22	Indian Super League	18	0	0	0	—		18	0
Chennaiyin	2022–23	Indian Super League	7	0	0	0	—		7	0
Chennaiyin	2023–24	Indian Super League	1	0	0	0	—		1	0
Chennaiyin	Career total		8	0	0	0	0	0	8	0
Career total			50	0	0	0	3	0	53	0

== Honours ==
=== Club ===
Mohun Bagan

- Calcutta Football League (1): 2018–19
