= Tomislav Mrčela =

Australian soccer player

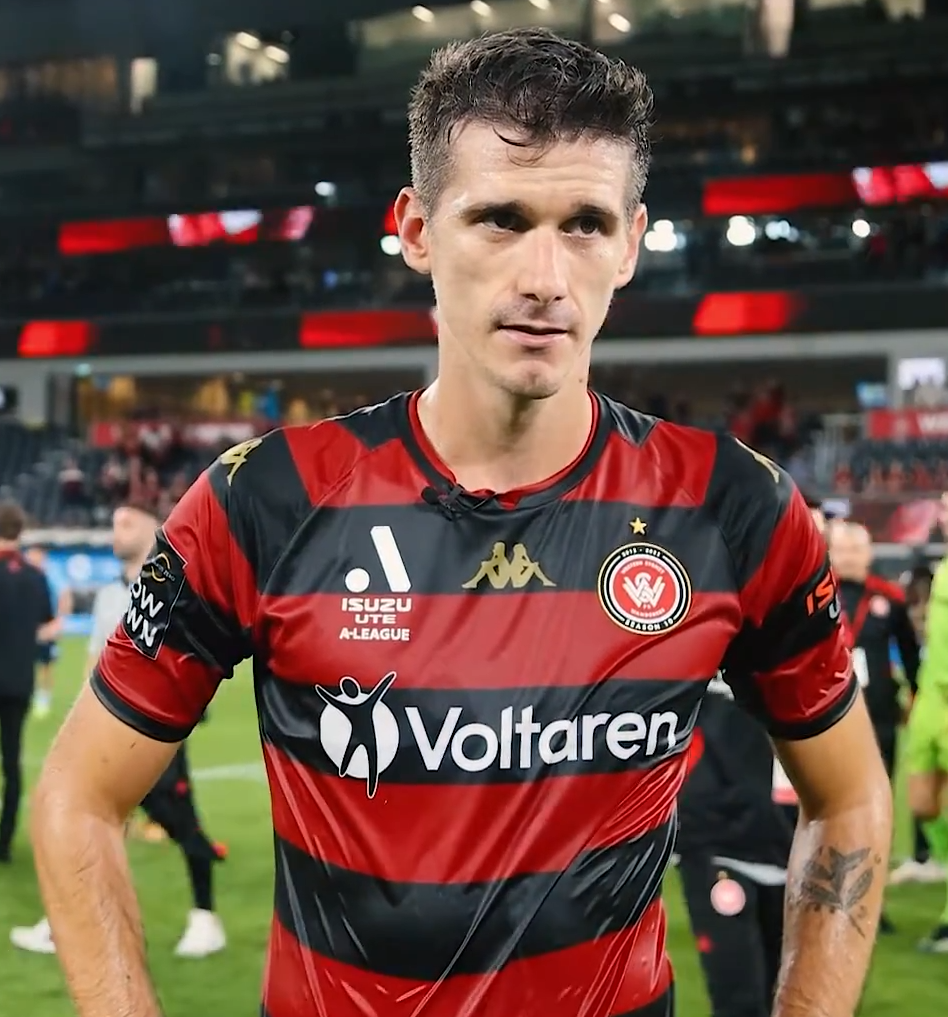
- Mrčela with Western Sydney Wanderers in 2022

Personal information
- Full name: Tomislav Mrčela
- Date of birth: 1 October 1990 (age 36)
- Place of birth: Attadale, Perth, Western Australia
- Height: 1.93 m (6 ft 4 in)
- Position: Centre-back

Youth career
- 2001–2009: RNK Split

Senior career*
Years	Team	Apps	(Gls)
2009	Jadran Kaštel Sućurac		
2010–2011	Primorac 1929	32	(0)
2011	Imotski	13	(3)
2012	RNK Split	0	(0)
2012	→ Imotski (loan)	28	(0)
2013	Mosor	12	(1)
2013–2014	Hrvatski Dragovoljac	27	(2)
2014–2016	Lokomotiva	50	(2)
2016–2018	Jeonnam Dragons	51	(3)
2018–2020	Perth Glory	30	(2)
2021–2022	East Bengal	9	(1)
2022–2023	Western Sydney Wanderers	38	(1)
2023–2024	Neftchi Fergana	8	(0)
2024	Rudeš	15	(3)
2024–2025	Perth Glory	19	(0)
2026	Kamen Ivanbegovina	10	(0)
- * Club domestic league appearances and goals as of 12 July 2026 ‡ National team caps and goals as of 13 June 2015

Tomislav Mrčela (Croatian pronunciation: [tǒmislaʋ mř̩tʃela]; born 1 October 1990) is an Australian professional soccer player who last played as a defender for Croatian Third League club Kamen Ivanbegovina.

== Club career ==
Mrcela left Australia at a young age and joined the youth academy of Dalmatian side RNK Split. He left Split in 2009 to join Jadran Kaštel Sućurac, a third division side at the time, and later signed for NK Primorac 1929 in 2010.

In mid 2011, Tomislav joined NK Imotski. Despite being just 20 years of age, Mrcela was immediately a starter. Missing just one game all season, Mrcela made 29 appearances and scored a further three goals. Mrcela continued his good form into the next season and missed just one further game by January 2013. His good form led to a move to fellow second division side NK Mosor where he played out the remainder of the 2012–13 season.

After good performances at Mosor, he moved to top division side NK Hrvatski Dragovoljac. Initially Mrcela struggled, making just four appearances in the first twelve rounds but then became a mainstay in the starting XI. Unfortunately his side were relegated by the end of the season but Mrcela did enough to convince ambitious Zagreb side NK Lokomotiva to keep him in the first division by signing him on a four-year deal

Mrcela scored his first goal for Lokomotiva on debut in a 5–2 loss against HNK Hajduk Split.

On 28 June 2016, Mrcela transferred to South Korean club Jeonnam Dragons.

On 14 June 2018, Mrcela left Jeonnam Dragons to join Australian A-League club Perth Glory on a two-year deal. During his stay at the club, he won the A-League and contributed massively to the team's success.

On 14 September 2021, Mrcela joined Indian Super League club SC East Bengal on a one-year deal. He scored his first goal for the club on 12 December in a 1–1 draw against Kerala Blasters. He was later replaced by Nepali defender Ananta Tamang as their sole AFC Quota.

On 17 February 2022, he moved back to Australia signing with Western Sydney Wanderers until the end of the 2021–22 A-League Men season as an injury replacement player for captain Rhys Williams. After making 12 appearances, Mrcela signed a two-year contract extension with the club.

Mrcela scored his first goal for the Wanderers on 15 October 2022 in a 1-0 win against Melbourne Victory. After helping the club to their first finals appearance in 6 years, Mrcela left the club to join Uzbek side Neftchi Fergana.

== International career ==
Holding dual citizenship, Mrcela is eligible to play for either Croatia or Australia. On 10 June 2015, he was named in a 23-man squad for Australia before two 2018 FIFA World Cup qualifying matches against Kyrgyzstan.

== Career statistics ==
=== Club ===
As of 5 May 2022

Appearances and goals by club, season and competition
Club	Season	League			Cup		Continental		Total	
Club	Season	Division	Apps	Goals	Apps	Goals	Apps	Goals	Apps	Goals
Imotski	2011–12	Druga HNL	27	3	0	0	—		27	3
Imotski	2012–13	Druga HNL	14	0	0	0	—		14	0
Imotski	Total		41	3	0	0	0	0	41	3
Mosor	2012–13	Druga HNL	12	1	0	0	—		12	1
Mosor	Total		12	1	0	0	0	0	12	1
Hrvatski Dragovoljac	2013–14	Prva HNL	27	2	0	0	—		27	2
Hrvatski Dragovoljac	Total		27	2	0	0	0	0	27	2
Lokomotiva Zagreb	2014–15	Prva HNL	30	1	3	0	—		33	1
Lokomotiva Zagreb	2015–16	Prva HNL	20	1	2	0	4 (Note: Appearance(s) in Europa League)	0	26	1
Lokomotiva Zagreb	Total		50	2	5	0	4	0	59	2
Jeonnam Dragons	2016	K League 1	21	0	0	0	—		21	0
Jeonnam Dragons	2017	K League 1	28	3	2	0	—		30	3
Jeonnam Dragons	2018	K League 1	2	0	0	0	—		2	0
Jeonnam Dragons	Total		51	3	2	0	0	0	53	3
Perth Glory	2018–19	A-League	12	0	0	0	—		12	0
Perth Glory	2019–20	A-League	18	2	1	1	1 (Note: Appearance(s) in the AFC Champions League)	0	20	3
Perth Glory	Total		30	2	1	1	1	0	32	3
East Bengal	2021–22	Indian Super League	9	1	0	0	—		9	1
Western Sydney Wanderers	2021–22	A-League	12	0	0	0	—		12	0
Career total			232	14	8	1	5	0	245	15

== Honours ==
Perth Glory

- A-League Premiers: 2018–19
