= Fran Sota =

Spanish footballer

Personal information
- Full name: Francisco José Sota Bernard
- Date of birth: 30 October 1990 (age 36)
- Place of birth: Aldeanueva de Ebro, La Rioja, Spain
- Height: 1.72 m (5 ft 7 1/2 in)
- Position: Attacking midfielder

Team information
- Current team: Alfaro
- Number: 5

Youth career
- Osasuna

Senior career*
Years	Team	Apps	(Gls)
2009–2010	Osasuna B	17	(0)
2010–2011	Peña Sport	32	(1)
2012–2014	Logroñés	47	(1)
2014–2015	Tropezón	29	(4)
2015–2017	Leioa	55	(11)
2017–2018	Racing Ferrol	31	(4)
2018–2020	Leioa	46	(10)
2020–2021	Calahorra	22	(4)
2022	East Bengal	5	(0)
2022–2023	Logroñés	12	(1)
2024–	Alfaro	53	(0)
- * Club domestic league appearances and goals as of 14 May 2026

Francisco José Sota Bernard (born 30 October 1990), known as Fran Sota, is a Spanish professional footballer who plays as an attacking midfielder for Segunda Federación club Alfaro.

== Club career ==
He started his career at Osasuna and was a part of their reserves team in the 2009–10 season. Afterwards, he played for a number of football clubs in the lower divisions of the Spanish league system. He turned out for Pena Sport FC, CD Varea, SD Logrones, CD Tropezon, SD Leioa and Racing Ferrol before joining CD Calahorra ahead of the 2020–21 season.

On 25 January 2022, Sota joined Indian Super League club East Bengal on a short-term deal. He made his league debut on 2 February against Chennaiyin in their 2–2 draw.

== Career statistics ==
=== Club ===
As of match played 28 February 2022

Club performance			League		Cup		Continental		Total	
Club	League	Season	Apps	Goals	Apps	Goals	Apps	Goals	Apps	Goals
Osasuna B	Segunda División B	2009–10	17	0	0	0	–		17	0
Peña Sport	Segunda División B	2010–11	32	1	0	0	–		32	1
Logroñés	Segunda División B	2012–13	25	0	2 (Note: Appearance(s) in Copa del Rey)	0	–		27	0
Logroñés	Segunda División B	2013–14	22	1	0	0	–		22	1
Logroñés	Logroñés total		47	1	2	0	0	0	49	1
Tropezón	Segunda División B	2014–15	29	4	0	0	–		29	4
Leioa	Segunda División B	2015–16	29	4	0	0	–		29	4
Leioa	Segunda División B	2016–17	28	7	0	0	–		28	7
Leioa	Leioa total		57	11	0	0	0	0	57	11
Racing Ferrol	Segunda División B	2017–18	31	4	1	0	–		32	4
Leioa	Segunda División B	2018–19	34	8	0	0	–		34	8
Leioa	Segunda División B	2019–20	13	2	1	0	–		14	2
Leioa	Leioa total		47	10	1	0	0	0	48	10
Calahorra	Segunda División B	2020–21	23	4	1	0	–		23	4
East Bengal	Indian Super League	2021–22	5	0	0	0	–		5	0
Logroñés	Primera División RFEF	2022–23	0	0	0	0	–		0	0
Career total			288	35	5	0	0	0	293	35
