= SC Delhi Reserves and Academy =

SC Delhi Reserves
- Full name: Sporting Club Delhi Reserves and Academy
- Short name: SCD
- Founded: 2019; 7 years ago (as Hyderabad FC Reserves and Academy); 2025; 1 year ago (as SC Delhi Reserves and Academy)
- Ground: Ambedkar Stadium
- Capacity: 35,000
- Owners: B.C. Jindal Group
- League: Reliance Foundation Development League

Sporting Club Delhi Reserves and Academy started as the reserve team and youth academy system of Indian Super League club based in New Delhi. They compete in the RF Development League.

== History ==
On 10 January 2020, it was announced that Indian Super League club Hyderabad would field a reserve team in the upcoming 2019–20 I-League 2nd Division. The team was placed in Group B alongside Mohammedan, Bhawanipore, Chennaiyin Reserves, and Bengaluru B. They played their first match of the league on 6 February 2020 against Chennaiyin Reserves and won 3–1.

On 20 August 2020, it was announced Hyderabad signed Thangboi Sinto and Shameel Chembakath as their technical director and reserve team head coach respectively.

Under the leadership of Shameel Chembakath, the Hyderabad FC B team secured the runner-up position in the CEM Gold Cup, which was held in Assam in January 2022, marking their first major trophy.

The Hyderabad FC B team, under the guidance of Shameel Chembakath, achieved 3rd place in the inaugural Reliance Development League during the 2021-2022 season, held in Mumbai.

== See also ==
- SC Delhi
