= 2019–20 ATK season =

Last season in existence of ATK

ATK
2019–20 season
- Head Coach: Antonio López Habas
- Stadium: Salt Lake Stadium
- Indian Super League: 2nd
- ISL playoffs: Champions
- Super Cup: Cancelled
- Top goalscorer: Roy Krishna (15)
Home colours	Away colours

The 2019–20 season was ATK's sixth season since its establishment in 2014 and their sixth season in the Indian Super League. The 2019–20 season was ATK's last season before it got merged with I-League club Mohun Bagan FC to form ATK Mohun Bagan FC.

== Pre-season and friendlies ==
12 September 2019 Friendly	ATK	4–0	ATK Reserves	Kolkata
	Krishna; Javi; Jobby			Stadium: Salt Lake Practice Ground II

21 September 2019 Friendly	ATK	6–0	Southern Samity	Kolkata
	Balwant; Krishna; Soosairaj; Sehnaj			Stadium: Salt Lake Practice Ground II

29 September 2019 Friendly	ATK	3–5	Mohammedan	Kolkata
	Krishna; Williams; Jayesh		Camara; V. Chhangte	Stadium: Salt Lake Practice Ground II

4 October 2019 Friendly	ATK	4–1	Peerless	Kolkata
	Krishna; Williams		Kromah	Stadium: Salt Lake Practice Ground II

10 October 2019 Friendly	ATK	abandoned	TRAU	Kolkata
				Stadium: Salt Lake Practice Ground II

== Competitions ==
=== Indian Super League ===
==== League table ====
Pos	Team	Pld	W	D	L	GF	GA	GD	Pts	Qualification
1	Goa (L)	18	12	3	3	46	23	+23	39	Qualification for 2021 AFC Champions League group stage and ISL playoffs
2	ATK (Note: Originally, Mohun Bagan, the 2019–20 I-League champions (they were already assured of the title before the league was abandoned due to the COVID-19 pandemic in India), would qualify as India 2 (2021 AFC Cup group stage), and ATK, the 2020 Indian Super League playoffs winners, would qualify as India 3 (2021 AFC Cup qualifying play-offs). However, ATK owners KGSPL ceased their football operation and bought majority stakes in Mohun Bagan FC (India) Private Limited and rebranded Mohun Bagan football team as ATK Mohun Bagan FC from the 2020–21 Indian Super League which qualified as India 2 in 2021 AFC club competition. The All India Football Federation decided that Bengaluru FC, the 2019–20 Indian Super League regular season 3rd place (behind FC Goa, which qualified for the 2021 AFC Champions League, and ATK), will qualify as India 3.) (C)	18	10	4	4	33	16	+17	34	Advance to ISL playoffs
3	Bengaluru	18	8	6	4	22	13	+9	30	Qualification for 2021 AFC Cup play-off round and ISL playoffs
4	Chennaiyin	18	8	5	5	32	26	+6	29	Advance to ISL playoffs
5	Mumbai City	18	7	5	6	25	29	−4	26	

Source: Indian Super League
Rules for classification: 1) points; 2) head-to-head points; 3) head-to-head goal difference; 4) head-to-head goals scored; 5) goal difference; 5) number of goals scored; 6) fair play ranking; 6) drawing of lots
(C) Champions; (L) League Winners' Shield Winners

==== Results by matchday ====
Matchday	1	2	3	4	5	6	7	8	9	10	11	12	13	14	15	16	17	18
Ground	A	H	A	H	A	H	A	A	A	H	A	H	H	H	A	H	H	A
Result	L	W	W	W	D	D	W	L	D	W								
Position	10	5	2	1	1	1	1	2	3									

Updated to match(es) played on 25 December 2019. Source: soccerway
A = Away; H = Home; W = Win; D = Draw; L = Loss

==== Fixtures ====
===== League stage =====
20 October 2019 1	Kerala Blasters	2–1	ATK	Kochi
19:30 IST (UTC+05:30)	Ogbeche 30' (pen.), 45'; Rodrigues (yellow card) 18'	Report	McHugh 6'; Rane (yellow card) 15'; Hernández (yellow card) 70'; Agus (yellow card) 88'	Stadium: Jawaharlal Nehru Stadium; Attendance: 36,298; Referee: Srikrishna; Man of the Match: Ogbeche (Kerala)

25 October 2019 2	ATK	5–0	Hyderabad	Kolkata
19:30 IST (UTC+05:30)	Williams 25', 44'; Krishna 27'; Soosairaj (yellow card) 81'; García 88', 90+4'	Report	Panwar (yellow card) 42'; Singh (yellow card) 60'; Marcelinho (yellow card) 87'x	Stadium: Salt Lake Stadium; Attendance: 26,240; Referee: Bora; Man of the Match: Williams (ATK)

30 October 2019 3	Chennaiyin	0–1	ATK	Chennai
19:30 IST (UTC+05:30)	Valskis (yellow card) 90+3'	Report	Williams 48'	Stadium: Jawaharlal Nehru Stadium; Referee: Saha; Man of the Match: Williams (ATK)

9 November 2019 4	ATK	3–1	Jamshedpur	Kolkata
19:30 IST (UTC+05:30)	Kotal (yellow card) 30'; Krishna 57' (pen.), 71' (pen.); McHugh (yellow card) 76'; García 90+4'	Report	Pereira (yellow card) 3'; Choudhary (yellow card) 42'; Tiri (yellow card) 69'; Pal (yellow card) 70'; Sergio Castel 85'	Stadium: Salt Lake Stadium; Attendance: 8,690; Referee: Gupta; Man of the Match: Krishna (ATK)

24 November 2019 5	Odisha	0–0	ATK	Pune
19:30 IST (UTC+05:30)	Diagne (yellow card) 90+1'	Report	Edathodika (yellow card) 15'; Agus (yellow card) 90+1'	Stadium: Shree Shiv Chhatrapati Sports Complex; Referee: John; Man of the Match: Santana (Odisha)

30 November 2019 6	ATK	2–2	Mumbai City	Kolkata
19:30 IST (UTC+05:30)	Soosairaj 38'; Edathodika (yellow card) 81'; Krishna 90+6'	Report	Bose (yellow card) 30'; Chaudhari 62'; Kevyn (yellow card) 89' (goal) 90+3'	Stadium: Salt Lake Stadium; Attendance: 33,515; Referee: Gupta; Man of the Match: Kevyn (Mumbai City)

7 December 2019 7	NorthEast United	0–3	ATK	Guwahati
19:30 IST (UTC+05:30)	Triadis (yellow card) 48'; Leudo (yellow card) 70'; Khawlhring (yellow card) 83'	Report	Williams 11'; Krishna 35', 90+4'; Das (yellow card) 71'; Singh (yellow card) 76'; Bhattacharya (yellow card) 86'	Stadium: Indira Gandhi Athletic Stadium; Attendance: 13,393; Referee: Alkhudhayr; Man of the Match: Williams (ATK)

14 December 2019 8	Goa	2–1	ATK	Margao
19:30 IST (UTC+05:30)	Fernandes (yellow card) 14'; Fall 60'; Coro 66'; Jahouh (yellow card) 75'	Report	Agus (yellow card) 8'; Singh (yellow card) 30'; Justin 64'	Stadium: Fatorda Stadium; Attendance: 12,817; Referee: Bora; Man of the Match: Fall (Goa)

21 December 2019 9	Hyderabad	2–2	ATK	Hyderabad
19:30 IST (UTC+05:30)	Barnes (yellow card) 9'; Bobô 39', 85'; Singh (yellow card) 86'; Khan (yellow card) 89'	Report	Krishna 15' (pen.), 90'; Rathi (yellow card) 45+2'; Singh (yellow card) 64'	Stadium: G. M. C. Balayogi Athletic Stadium; Referee: Senthil; Man of the Match: Bobô (Hyderabad)

25 December 2019 6	ATK	1–0	Bengaluru	Kolkata
19:30 IST (UTC+05:30)	Kotal (yellow card) 25'; Williams 47'; Mandi (yellow card) 53'; Agus (yellow card) 69'	Report	Kuruniyan (yellow card) 68'; Kumar (yellow card) 90'	Stadium: Salt Lake Stadium; Attendance: 18,326; Referee: Venkatesh; Man of the Match: Williams (ATK)

12 January 2020 12	ATK	0-1	Kerala Blasters	Kolkata
19:30 IST (UTC+05:30)	Javi (yellow card) 39'; Mandi (yellow card) 89'	Report	Arqués (yellow card) 34'; Narzary 70'; Prasanth (yellow card) 90'; Drobarov (yellow card) 90+'	Stadium: Salt Lake Stadium; Attendance: 22,336; Referee: L Ajith Metei; Man of the Match: Narzary (Kerala)

===== Playoffs =====
Semi-finals
1	Goa	1	4	5
4	Chennaiyin	4	2	6
2	ATK	0	3	3
3	Bengaluru	1	1	2

Final
4	Chennaiyin	1
2	ATK	3

Team 1	Agg.	Team 2	1st leg	2nd leg
Chennaiyin	6–5	Goa	4–1	2–4
Bengaluru	2–3	ATK	1–0	1–3

14 March 2020 Final	ATK	3–1	Chennaiyin	Fatorda Stadium, Margao
19:30 IST	Javi Hernández 10', 90+3'; Edu Garcia 48'	Report	Valskis 69'	Attendance: 0 Referee: Kasimov Sharzod (Uzbekistan)

== Players ==
=== Squad ===
Note: Flags indicate national team as defined under FIFA eligibility rules; some limited exceptions apply. Players may hold more than one non-FIFA nationality.

No.	Pos.	Nation	Player
1	GK	IND	Dheeraj Singh
2	DF	IND	Sumit Rathi
4	DF	ENG	John Johnson
6	DF	IND	Ricky Lallawmawma
7	MF	IND	Komal Thatal
8	MF	IRL	Carl McHugh
9	FW	AUS	David Williams
10	MF	ESP	Edu García
13	GK	IND	Avilash Paul
14	DF	ESP	Agus Garcia
15	FW	IND	Balwant Singh
16	MF	IND	Jayesh Rane
17	MF	IND	Pronay Halder

No.	Pos.	Nation	Player
18	MF	AUS	Dario Vidošić
19	MF	ESP	Javi Hernández
20	DF	IND	Pritam Kotal
21	FW	FIJ	Roy Krishna
22	FW	IND	Jobby Justin
23	MF	IND	Michael Soosairaj
24	DF	IND	Salam Ranjan Singh
25	MF	IND	Michael Regin
26	MF	IND	Sehnaj Singh
28	DF	IND	Ankit Mukherjee
29	GK	IND	Arindam Bhattacharya
30	DF	IND	Anas Edathodika
33	DF	IND	Prabir Das
65	DF	IND	Sena Ralte

=== Other players under contract ===
Note: Flags indicate national team as defined under FIFA eligibility rules; some limited exceptions apply. Players may hold more than one non-FIFA nationality.

No.	Pos.	Nation	Player
—	MF	IND	Cavin Lobo
—	MF	IND	Hitesh Sharma

=== Out on loan ===
Note: Flags indicate national team as defined under FIFA eligibility rules; some limited exceptions apply. Players may hold more than one non-FIFA nationality.

No.	Pos.	Nation	Player
—	GK	IND	Debjit Majumder (on loan to Mohun Bagan until 31 May 2020)
—	MF	IND	Sheikh Faiaz (on loan to Mohun Bagan until 31 May 2020)

== Season statistics ==
=== Scoring ===
==== Top scorers ====
Rank	Player	Club	Goals
1
