= List of ATK records and statistics =

ATK (previously known as Atlético de Kolkata) was a professional football club based in Kolkata, West Bengal, which played in the Indian Super League until its merger with Mohun Bagan AC in 2020 to form Mohun Bagan Super Giant. It was established on 7 May 2014 as the first team in the Indian Super League. Initially for first three seasons Spanish La Liga club Atlético Madrid were also a co-owner, later Sanjiv Goenka bought the shares owned by Atlético Madrid. After the end of their partnership with Spanish giant, Atletico de Kolkata has been rechristened to ATK.

This list encompasses the major honours won by ATK and records set by the players and managers. The player records section includes details of the club's leading goalscorers and those who have made most appearances in first-team competitions. The club is tied for the record for the most Indian Super League titles, two, alongside Chennaiyin FC. The club's record appearance maker is Borja Fernández, who made 47 appearances (2014–2016) and the club's record goalscorer is Iain Hume, who scored 18 goals in 30 appearances(2015-2016).

All stats accurate as of match played 03 April 2018.

== Honours ==
The club holds the most number of Indian Super League titles and were the first team to lift the ISL trophy.

=== National titles ===
- Indian Super League
  - Winners(3): 2014, 2016, 2019–20

== Players ==
All current players are in bold

=== Appearances ===
- Youngest player to play: **Komal Thatal** – **17 years 132 days** (against Jamshedpur FC, ISL, 28 January 2018).
- Oldest player to play:Jussi Jääskeläinen – **42 years 226 days** (against Jamshedpur FC, ISL, 1 December 2017)
- Most consecutive appearances: **Pritam Kotal** – **30*** (25 January 2019 – Present)

=== Most appearances ===
| # | Name | Years | League | Cup | Durand | Total |
|---|---|---|---|---|---|---|
| 1 | (India) **Jayesh Rane** | 2017-present | 49 | 3 | 0 | 52 |
| 2 | (India) **Prabir Das** | 2016-present | 46 | 2 | 3 | 51 |
| 3 | (Spain) Borja Fernández | 2014-2016 | 47 | - | - | 47 |
| 4 | (India) Arnab Mondal | 2014-2016, 2018-2019 | 45 | 1 | - | 46 |
| 5 | (India) **Pritam Kotal** | 2016, 2019-present | 39 | 3 | - | 42 |
| 6 | (India) **Arindam Bhattacharya** | 2018-present | 38 | - | - | 38 |
| 7 | (India) Hitesh Sharma | 2017-2019 | 27 | 2 | 3 | 32 |
| 8 | (Botswana) Ofentse Nato | 2014-2016 | 31 | - | - | 31 |
| 9 | (India) Debjit Majumder | 2016-2019 | 27 | 3 | - | 30 |
| 10 | (Canada) Iain Hume | 2015-2016 | 30 | - | - | 30 |

=== Player records ===
- Most goals in a season in all competitions: **Roy Krishna** – **15** (2019–20)
- Most goals in league: **Roy Krishna** – **15** (2019–20)
- Most goals scored in a match: Iain Hume – **3** (2015), **Roy Krishna** - **3** (2020)
- Most goals in a cup match: Balwant Singh - **3** (2019)
- Most Hat-tricks: Iain Hume – **2** (2015-2016)
- Best goal scoring rate: Robbie Keane – **0.73**
- Best goal scoring streak: Robbie Keane – **5**
- Most Assists in one match: **Jayesh Rane** - **3** (2019, vs Delhi Dynamos)
- Most Clean sheets: **Arindam Bhattacharya**- **13** (2018 - Present)

=== Overall scorers ===
| # | Name | Years | League | Cup | Total | Ratio |
|---|---|---|---|---|---|---|
| 1 | (Canada) Iain Hume | 2015-2016 | 18 (30) | 0 (0) | **18** (30) | 0.60 |
| 2 | (Fiji) **Roy Krishna** | 2019-present | 15 (21) | 0 (0) | **15** (21) | 0.71 |
| 3 | **(Spain) Edu Garcia** | 2019-present | 9 (22) | 0 (2) | **9** (24) | 0.38 |
| 4 | (Republic of Ireland) Robbie Keane | 2017-2018 | 6 (9) | 2 (2) | **8** (11) | 0.73 |
| 5 | (Spain) Manuel Lanzarote | 2018-2019 | 5 (14) | 2 (3) | **7** (17) | 0.41 |
| 6 | (Australia) **David Williams** | 2019-present | 7 (18) | 0 (0) | **7** (18) | 0.39 |
| 7 | (India) Balwant Singh | 2018-2020 | 2 (20) | 4 (3) | **6** (24) | 0.21 |
| 8 | (India) Arata Izumi | 2015 | 5 (11) | 0 (0) | **5** (11) | 0.45 |
| 9 | (Ethiopia) Fikru Teferra | 2014 | 5 (12) | 0 (0) | **5** (12) | 0.42 |
| 10 | (South Africa) Sameegh Doutie | 2015-2016 | 5 (26) | 0 (0) | **5** (26) | 0.19 |

=== Captains ===
| Years | Captain |
|---|---|
| 2014–2015 | (Spain) Luis García |
| 2015–2017 | (Spain) Borja Fernández |
| 2017–2018 | (Republic of Ireland) Robbie Keane |
| 2018–2019 | (Spain) Manuel Lanzarote |
| 2019 (Durand Cup) | (India) Prabir Das |
| 2019–2020 | (India) Pritam Kotal (Fiji) Roy Krishna |

== Team records ==
- Biggest Win: 5–0 (vs Hyderabad FC; 25 October 2019)
- Biggest Loss: 5–1 (vs FC Goa; 28 February 2018)
- Highest attendance: 68,340 (vs Chennaiyin FC; 16 December 2015)
- Lowest attendance: 3,165 (vs NorthEast United FC; 4 March 2018)
- Fewest defeats in a season: 2 (2016 ISL Season)
- Most draws in a season: 9 (2016 ISL Season)
