= 2020 Indian Super League final =

Association football match

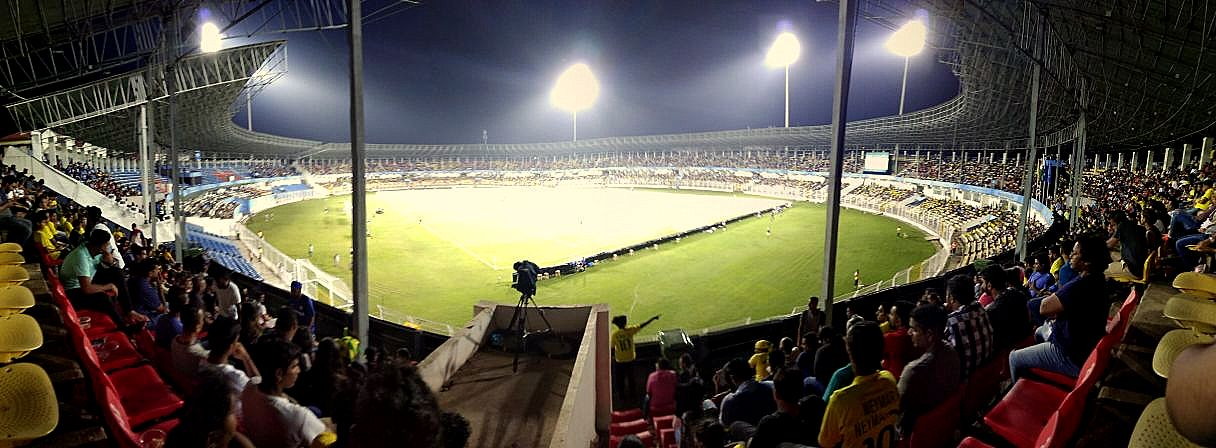
- Event: 2019–20 Indian Super League
ATK	Chennaiyin
(India)	(India)
3	1
- Date: 14 March 2020
- Venue: Fatorda Stadium, Margao, Goa
- Man of the Match: Arindam Bhattacharya (ATK)
- Referee: Kasimov Sharzod
- Attendance: 0 (Note: The final was played behind closed doors due to a COVID-19 pandemic in India.)

The 2020 Indian Super League final was the final match of the 2020 Indian Super League playoffs, the sixth playoffs season of the Indian Super League. It was played between Chennayin FC and ATK, on 14 March 2020 at the Fatorda Stadium, Goa. It was played to determine the champions of the 2019–20 Indian Super League.

Owing to COVID-19 pandemic in India the final was played behind closed doors.

Two times Champions ATK won the final after beating Chennayin by 3–1.

== Background ==
Prior to this cup final both the finalists ATK and Chennayin won the trophy twice (the maximum ever won by any Indian Super League side). ATK won in 2014 and 2016 both against Kerala Blasters whereas Chennayin won in 2015 against Goa (in the same stadium where the final match of this season was played) and in 2018 against Bengaluru FC. Also both the teams reached the final previously for twice, hence they were going to appear for their 3rd final which also meant that this final was going to decide the 3rd for either of these teams.

== Match ==
14 March 2020
19:30 IST

Atlético de Kolkata	3–1	Chennaiyin
Javi Hernández 10', 90+3'; Edu Garcia 48'	Report	Valskis 69'

Fatorda Stadium, Margao
Attendance: 0
Referee: Kasimov Sharzod (Uzbekistan)

Atlético de Kolkata	Chennaiyin FC

GK	29	(India) Arindam Bhattacharya
CB	20	(India) Pritam Kotal
CB	4	(England) John Johnson
CB	2	(India) Sumit Rathi
LB	33	(India) Prabir Das
AM	10	(Spain) Edu García
CM	25	(India) Michael Regin	(yellow card) 59'	(substituted off) 67'
CM	19	(Spain) Javi Hernández	(yellow card) 90+3'
LW	23	(India) Michael Soosairaj
ST	9	(Australia) David Williams
ST	21	(Fiji) Roy Krishna		(substituted off) 40'
Substitutes:
GK	1	(India) Dheeraj Singh
FW	3	(Spain) Mandi	(yellow card) 51'	(substituted on) 40'	(substituted off) 84'
FW	15	(India) Balwant Singh
MF	16	(India) Jayesh Rane
DM	17	(India) Pronay Halder		(substituted on) 67'
DF	18	(Spain) Víctor Mongil		(substituted on) 84'
FW	25	(India) Jobby Justin
Manager:
(Spain) Antonio López

GK	31	(India) Vishal Kaith
LB	18	(India) Jerry Lalrinzuala
CB	6	(Romania) Lucian Goian
CB	13	(Brazil) Eli Sabiá	(yellow card) 88'
RB	26	(India) Laldinliana Renthlei
CM	15	(India) Anirudh Thapa
DM	28	(India) Germanpreet Singh	(yellow card) 5'		(substituted off) 22'
LW	7	(India) Lallianzuala Chhangte
MF	50	(Brazil) Rafael Crivellaro
FW	27	(Malta) André Schembri		(substituted off) 76'
ST	9	(Lithuania) Nerijus Valskis
Substitutes:
GK	1	(India) Karanjit Singh
CDM	5	(Afghanistan) Masih Saighani
DM	8	(India) Edwin Sydney Vanspaul		(substituted on) 22'
LM	10	(Romania) Dragoș Firțulescu		(substituted on) 76'
MF	11	(India) Thoi Singh
CB	22	(India) Deepak Tangri
FW	24	(India) Rahim Ali
Manager:
(Republic of Ireland) Owen Coyle

Man of the Match:
(Spain) Javi Hernández (ATK)

Match rules

- 90 minutes.
- 30 minutes of extra-time if necessary.
- Penalty shoot-out if scores still level.
- nine named substitutes.
- Maximum of five substitutions.

== Aftermath ==
This victory meant ATK became the Indian Super League Champions for the 3rd time which made them the most successful team in the tournament's history. At the same time this defeat meant Chennayin lost the final for the 1st time.
