= Thoothoor =

Town in Tamil Nadu, India

Thoothoor, தூத்தூர் Thoothoor, தூத்தூர்,തൂത്തൂർ
- Village
- தூத்தூர், Thoothoor, തൂത്തൂർ
- Location in Tamil Nadu, India Thoothoor, தூத்தூர் (India)
- Coordinates: 8.260998°N 77.143094°E
- Country: India
- State: Tamil Nadu
- District: Killiyur Taluk Kanyakumari

Government
  - Type: First Grade Municipality Village Panchayat and Thoothoor Gram Panchayat
  - Body: Kollencode Municipality and Thoothoor Gram Panchayat

Population (2011)
  - Total: 8,000 +

Languages
  - Official: Tamil, Malayalam, English
- Time zone: UTC+5:30 (IST)
- Area code: 04651
- Vehicle registration: TN - 75
- Nearest city: Thiruvananthapuram, Nagercoil
- Climate: Tropical, Coastal (Köppen)
- Website: www.thoothoor.com

Thoothoor is a coastal village located in the Kanyakumari district in southern Tamil Nadu, India. It is located in the Taluk Killiyur, which borders the neighboring state of Kerala to the north.

== Etymology ==
The name Thoothoor has its roots in the Tamil words தூ/தூய்மை (cleanliness/immaculateness) and ஊர் (town/place), meaning a "clean place." The name is derived from the white sands everywhere that covered much of the area at a time when people occupied a small settlement and much of the land was vacant.

== History ==
The Catholic Church plays a conspicuous role in the day-to-day life of the fishermen of Thoothoor village. The conversion of the fishermen of this village to Christianity may be traced back to A.D. 1544. The event culminated in the works of St. Francis Xavier, who is said to have converted 10,000 Mukkuva fishermen living in thirteen villages along the coast (from Pallam to Poovar—Neerody, Marthandanthurai, Vallavilai, Eraviputhenthurai, Thoothoor, Poothurai, Thengapattanam, Enayam, Midalam, Vaniyakudy, Colachel, Kadiapattanam, Muttom and Pallam) in December 1544.

In 1600, the Thoothoor Parish Church was brought under the Padroado. Subsequently, this Parish came under the Diocese of Cochin. In 1838, St. Thomas Church, Thoothoor and other adjacent coastal churches from Pallithura to Erayumanthurai were brought under the Diocese of Varapuzha. This unification brought the Padroado–Propaganda dispute to a crucial stage. Ultimately, St. Thomas Church, Thoothoor was brought under the Diocese of Cochin with its revival in 1850.

The Diocese of Thiruvananthapuram was founded on 1 July 1937. In 1952 all the coastal Churches from Pallithura to Erayumanthurai were temporarily added to the Roman Catholic Archdiocese of Trivandrum or Thiruvananthapuram Diocese. The annexure was made permanent on 20 May 1955. Thus at present Thoothoor Parish Church is one of the Foranate Churches of Trivandrum Diocese.

== Geography ==
Thoothoor is a coastal village located along the Arabian Sea. It serves as the headquarters of the Thoothoor Panchayat, which comprises five villages: Thoothoor, Chinnathurai, Eraviputhenthurai, Poothurai, and Erayumanthurai. Collectively, these villages are commonly referred to as “Thoothoor.”

Geographically, Thoothoor is situated in Killiyoor Taluk of Kanyakumari District, Tamil Nadu, India. It lies approximately 45 km (28 miles) west of Nagercoil, the district headquarters, and about 40 km (25 miles) southeast of Thiruvananthapuram, the capital of Kerala. The nearest airport is Thiruvananthapuram International Airport, while the closest railway stations are Parassala and Kuzhithurai.

Thoothoor is predominantly a fishing village, with most of its residents engaged in fishing as their primary occupation. A small portion of the population is also involved in agriculture, particularly coconut cultivation, alongside other professions. Fishing activities are generally concentrated along a one-kilometer stretch of coastline.

The village has an approximate population of 8,000 people. It is bordered by Paalamadam to the north, the Arabian Sea to the south, Poothurai village to the east, and Chinnathurai village to the west.

== Economy ==
As of 2007, Thoothoor is the home of several significant economic sources. The main business is shark fishing, using modern types of equipment such as GPS and other Navigation tools. The average cost of one fishing boat is 30–60 lakhs in Indian currency. Fishermen usually go fishing in the Arabian Sea, the Bay of Bengal and the Indian Ocean. Boat owners travel in and around Tamil Nadu state and neighboring states such as Kerala, and the more distant state of Maharashtra. Now a few boat owners have moved to the Andaman & Nicobar Islands for deep sea fishing. Fishing is a major source of livelihood for many families in the area. Fisherman supports their families by fishing and hence their families are able to afford higher education. Thus, just like in modern cities most of the kids are getting higher education in a good atmosphere with a tremendous amount of good energy.

The main road is the centre for the shark business and shark merchandise, as well as some other fish on a small level. In terms of jobs, in Thoothoor there are a few main sectors, a large number of people from this place are working in industries such as IT, manufacturing, education, educational management, the medical field, business management, mechanical engineering, marine engineering, electrical engineering, lawyers, etc. All such people are trained professionals, graduates, and a few PhD holders in mathematics, history, Tamil and physics. There are masters in IT professional, fish merchandise, teachers in education sectors and a few health services.

A few hundred people are working in the Persian Gulf in countries such as UAE, Qatar, Saudi Arabia, etc. A fewer number of people working are in the UK, the US, Canada and New Zealand. Mechanical engineers and marine engineers work on international and local ships. Some MBAs are working at the south Indian bank. Some marine engineers work in international ships in the deep sea. They travel to various countries. There are a few hundred natives of Thoothoor working in Chennai, Bangalore, Mumbai, Delhi, and Thiruvananthapuram. The few people working locally work in small businesses and agriculture.

Agriculture crops are coconuts, bananas, mangos, neem trees, and other tropical fruits and vegetables.

== Transportation ==
- Government buses
- Taxi
- Auto rickshaws
- Private buses for travelling to distant cities such as Chennai, Madurai and Bangalore
- The nearest train station is in Kuzhithurai, 10 km away
- Thiruvananthapuram international airport is about 40 km

== Education ==
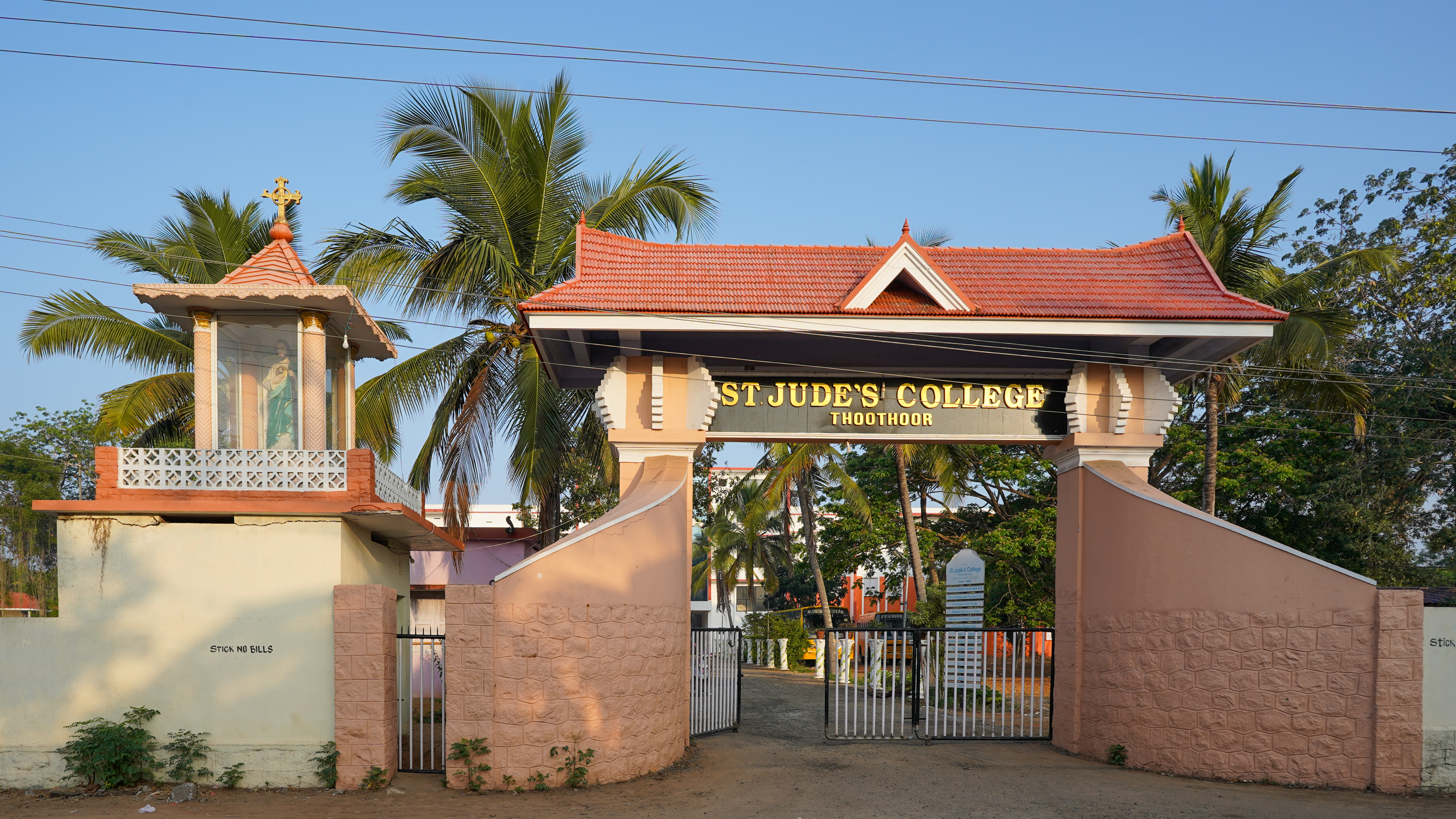
St. Jude's College

Education plays a vital role in Thoothoor. The Government Primary School provides education to the poor. The private schools include:

- St.Jude's College, Thoothoor, affiliated under Manonmaniam Sundaranar University, Tirunelveli.
- Pius XI Higher Secondary School, Thoothoor
- Pius XI Primary School, Thoothoor
- Infant Jesus Matriculation School, managed by St. Jude's College
- Canossa Pre–Primary School, managed by Canossa Convent, now this school is managed by St. Judes College
- Navajeevan English Medium school, Nithiravilai
- St.Johns matriculation school, Thoothoor, managed by St.Johns the Baptist sisters of Thoothoor convent.

The above educational institutions serve students from Thoothoor and neighbouring villages and towns.

== Sports ==
The main sport of the region is football, the passion for football in thoothoor spans several decades, but Thoothoor had very little to show for it in terms of churning out professional footballers until recent times.

In 2012, a team representing Kanyakumari district with 13 of its 16 members from Thoothoor lifted the inaugural Chief Minister's Trophy bringing home a whopping Rs. 1 lakh per player.

Thoothoor Forane Football Academy is the only academy to be established in the region and is set to begin functioning on September 27. TFFA will train 40 young Thoothoor footballers in the U-14 and U-16 categories.

Three from Thoothoor — Reagan Albarnas, A Jacksan Dhas and S Shinu — were part of the Tamil Nadu Santosh Trophy squad. and Around 20 footballers from the region have gone on to play for department sides like Indian Railways, ICF - Chennai, Chennai Nethaji Club, Indian Bank and Mumbai Hindustan Limited.

NLT (Netaji Library & Sports Club Thoothoor) was started in the year 1957. NLT which started its journey as a simple newspaper reading room has evolved as a giant organisation today with district level reputation as a library and multinational recognition as a sports club, particularly football.

NLT conducts the popular " One day Football tournament " every year on Easter Sunday, with prize money of 100,000 INR and thousands of people attending. The game is conducted in group stage and playoffs. As a result, NLT is recognised as a symbol of pride for people in Thoothoor region.

== Religion ==
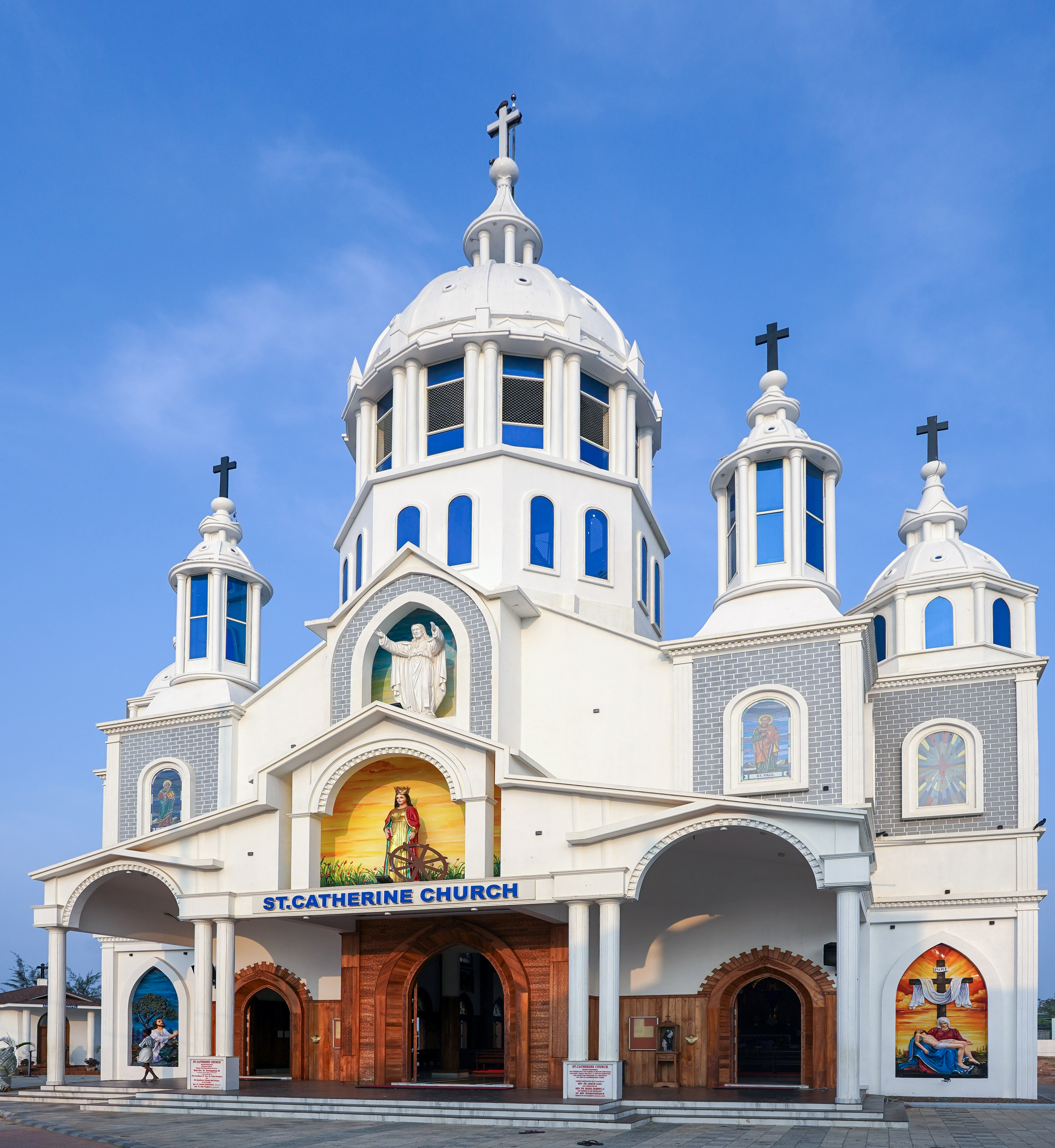
St. Catherine's Church, Eraviputhenthura

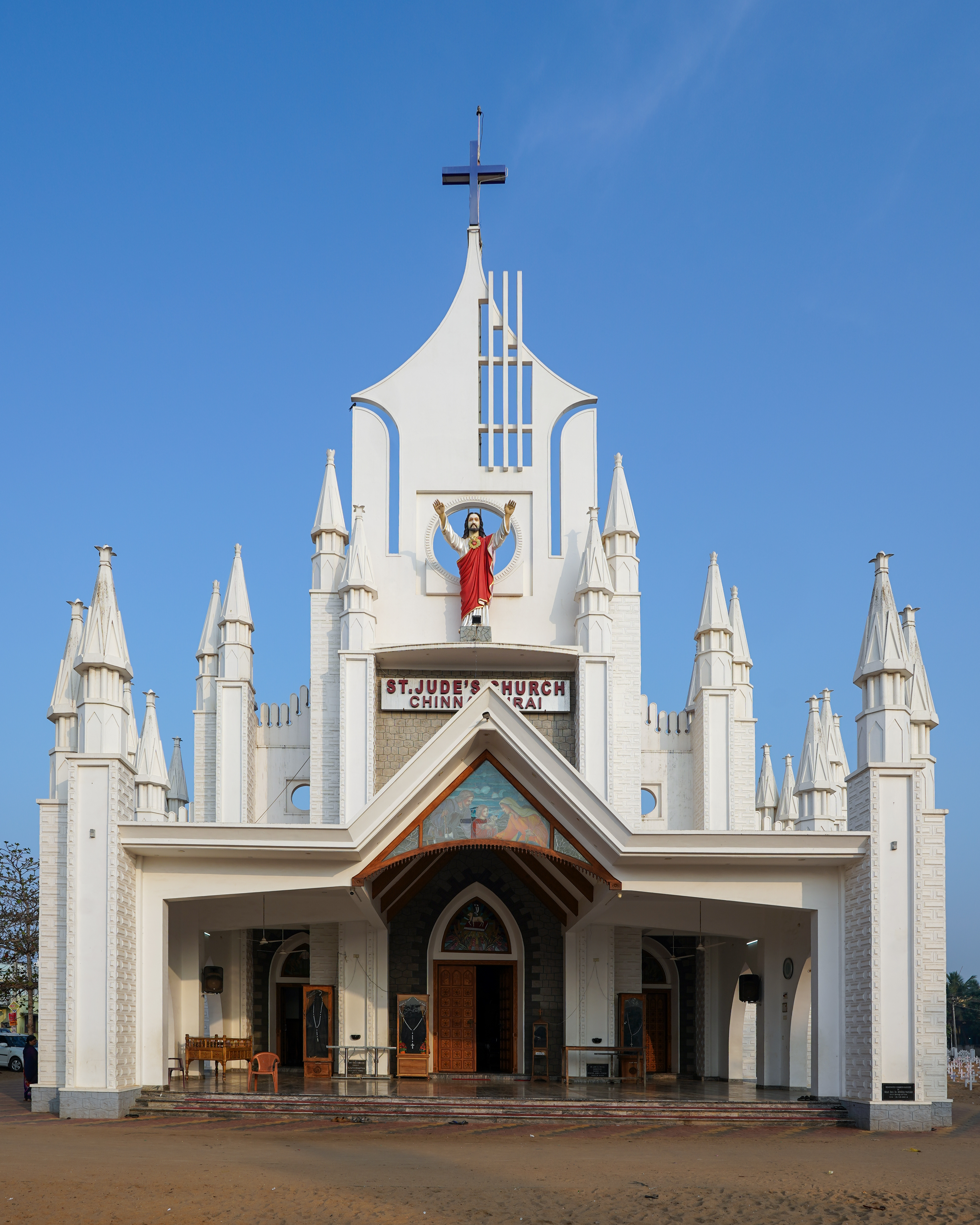
St. Jude's Church, Chinnathurai

The territory is a Catholic Christian community. This region was converted to Christianity during Saint Thomas the Apostle period. Thoothoor Forane church was built by the Dutch in about 1600 and renovated in 2010. Thoothoor Forane contains 8 Parishes belonging to the Roman Catholic Archdiocese of Trivandrum.

Roman Catholic Parishes in Thoothoor
Parish	Location
St. Thomas Forane Church	Thoothoor
Our Lady of Dolours Church	Marthanadanthura
St. Catherine's Church	Eraviputhenthura
St. John the Baptist Church	Poothurai
St. Jude's Church	Chinnathurai
St. Lucia's Church	Erayumanthurai
St. Mary's Church	Vallavilai
St. Nicholas Church	Neerody

== See also ==
- Thomas the Apostle
- Saint Francis Xavier
- Roman Catholic Church
- Kanyakumari
