= Michael Regin =

Indian footballer

Personal information
- Full name: Michael Regin
- Date of birth: 9 May 1988 (age 38)
- Place of birth: Eraviputhenthurai, India
- Position: Defensive midfielder

Senior career*
Years	Team	Apps	(Gls)
2017–19	Chennai City	11	(0)
2019–2020	ATK	7	(0)
2020—2021	Mohun Bagan	3	(0)
2023–	Kickstart	1	(0)
- * Club domestic league appearances and goals as of 13:33, 12 December 2020 (UTC)

Michael Regin is an Indian professional footballer who plays as a defensive midfielder for Kickstart in the I-League 3.

== Career ==
Regin has played for Chennai City in the Chennai Super Division and the I-League. He made his professional debut for the club in the league on 14 January 2017 against Bengaluru FC. He came on as a 55th-minute substitute for Marcos Thank as Chennai City lost 2–0.

He also represented Railways in the Santosh Trophy.

== Personal life ==
He is the younger brother of Michael Soosairaj, who plays as an attacking midfielder for Gokulam Kerala FC.

== Career statistics ==
As of 14 January 2017

Club	Season	League			League Cup		Domestic Cup		Continental		Total	
Club	Season	Division	Apps	Goals	Apps	Goals	Apps	Goals	Apps	Goals	Apps	Goals
Chennai City	2016–17	I-League	1	0	—	—	0	0	—	—	1	0
Career total			1	0	0	0	0	0	0	0	1	0

== Honours ==
=== Club ===
Chennai City FC

- I-League: 2018–19

ATK

- Indian Super League: 2019–20
