= Eraviputhenthurai =

Eraviputhenthurai Puthenthurai, E.P. Thurai
- Village
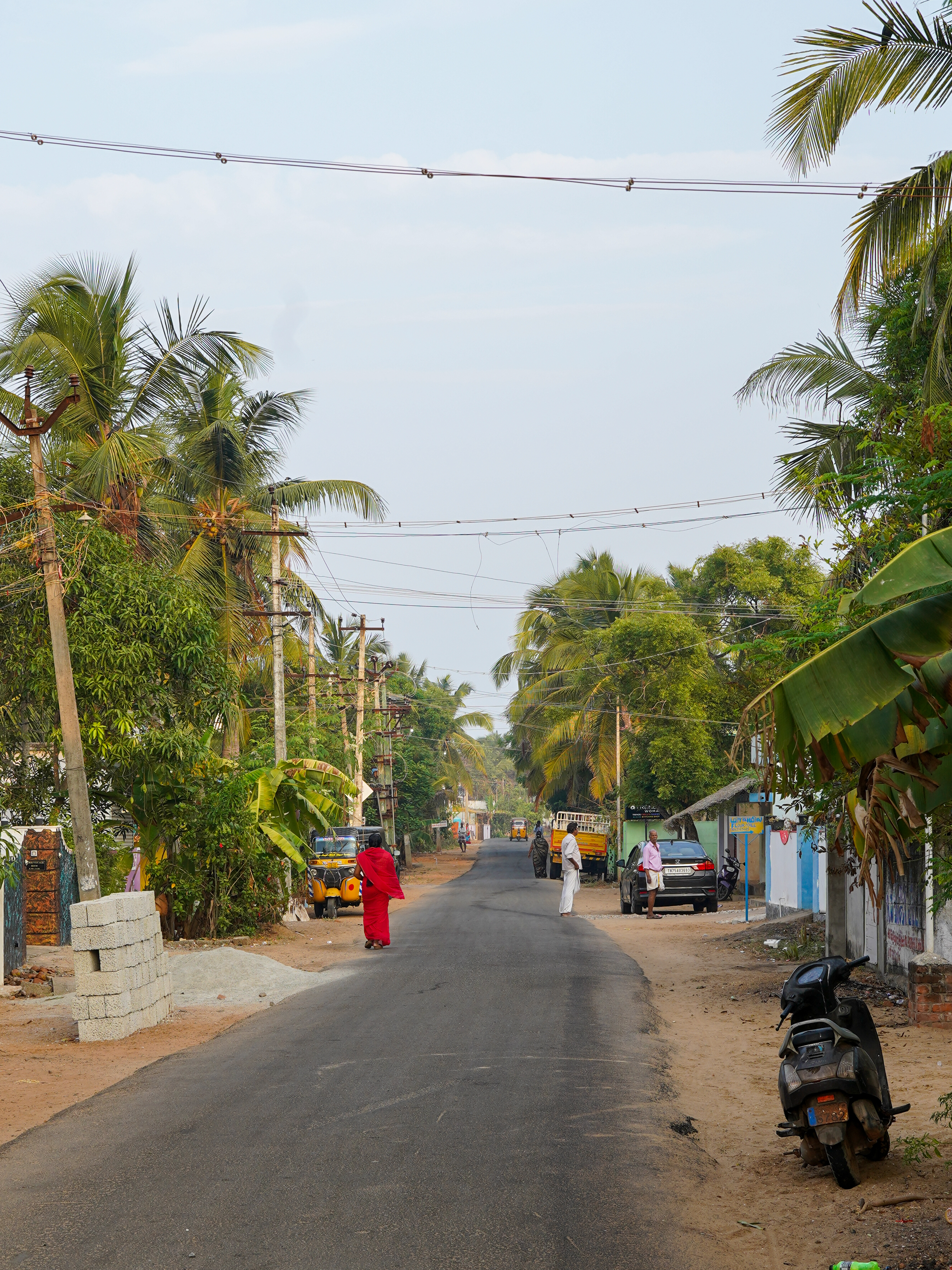
- Main road, view to NW

- Location in Tamil Nadu, India
- Coordinates: 8°15′57″N 77°8′9″E
- Country: India
- State: Tamil Nadu
- District: Kanyakumari

Population
  - Total: 10,087

Languages
  - Official: Tamil language, Malayalam
- Time zone: UTC+5:30 (IST)
- PIN: 629176
- Telephone code: 04651
- Vehicle registration: TN-75
- Website: www.epthurai.com

Eraviputhenthurai is a village on the coast of the Arabian Sea, in Thoothoor Village Panchayat, Killiyoor Taluk, Kanyakumari District, Tamil Nadu, India.

It is 48 km (30 mi) west of Nagercoil, the headquarters of Kanyakumari District and 45 km (28 mi) south-east of Thiruvananthapuram, the capital of Kerala State. The nearest airport is Thiruvananthapuram, and nearest railway stations are Parassala and Kuzhithurai.

This village is bounded in the north by the A.V.M (Anantha Victoria Marthandam) Canal, south by the Arabian Sea, east by Chinnathurai village and west by Thadeupuram village.

== Education and services ==
St. Joseph Middle School is managed by Eraviputhenthurai Parish, and is affiliated to State Board. The St. Catherine Pre-kindergarten School was managed by the Parish. Nursery Schools are run by Central and State Governments. Subjects include Computer Engineering, Medicine, Information Technology, Teaching, Arts, Science, Marine Engineering, Sports, etc.

Service organizations include St. Francis Animation and Social Center (F.A.S.C), St. Catherine Library and Sports Club, Eraviputhenthurai Football Association, Thiruvananthapuram Social Service Society [T.S.S.S.] Unit, Kottar Social Service Society [K.S.S.S.] Unit, Southern Catholic Youth Movement [S.C.Y.M.] Unit, Society of St. Vincent De Paul.

== Economy ==
Fishing is the primary occupation. The primary catch is sharks, using traditional and modern methods, including mechanised boats and long lining. Voyages last up to 30 days.

== History ==
The History of Eraviputhenthurai can be traced from the Legend. In the 16th century this region was ruled by King Kalinga. People say that this village changed after the legendary story happened in the Kingdom of Kalinga. Kalinga arranged marriage for his daughter. He invited well-wishers from everywhere and also invited Mother Sea, who instructed him in a dream that if she came, the kingdom would be no more. But the king compelled her to attend. In return Mother Sea sent a tsunami in the 16th century which destroyed his dynasty.

=== St. Catherine Church ===
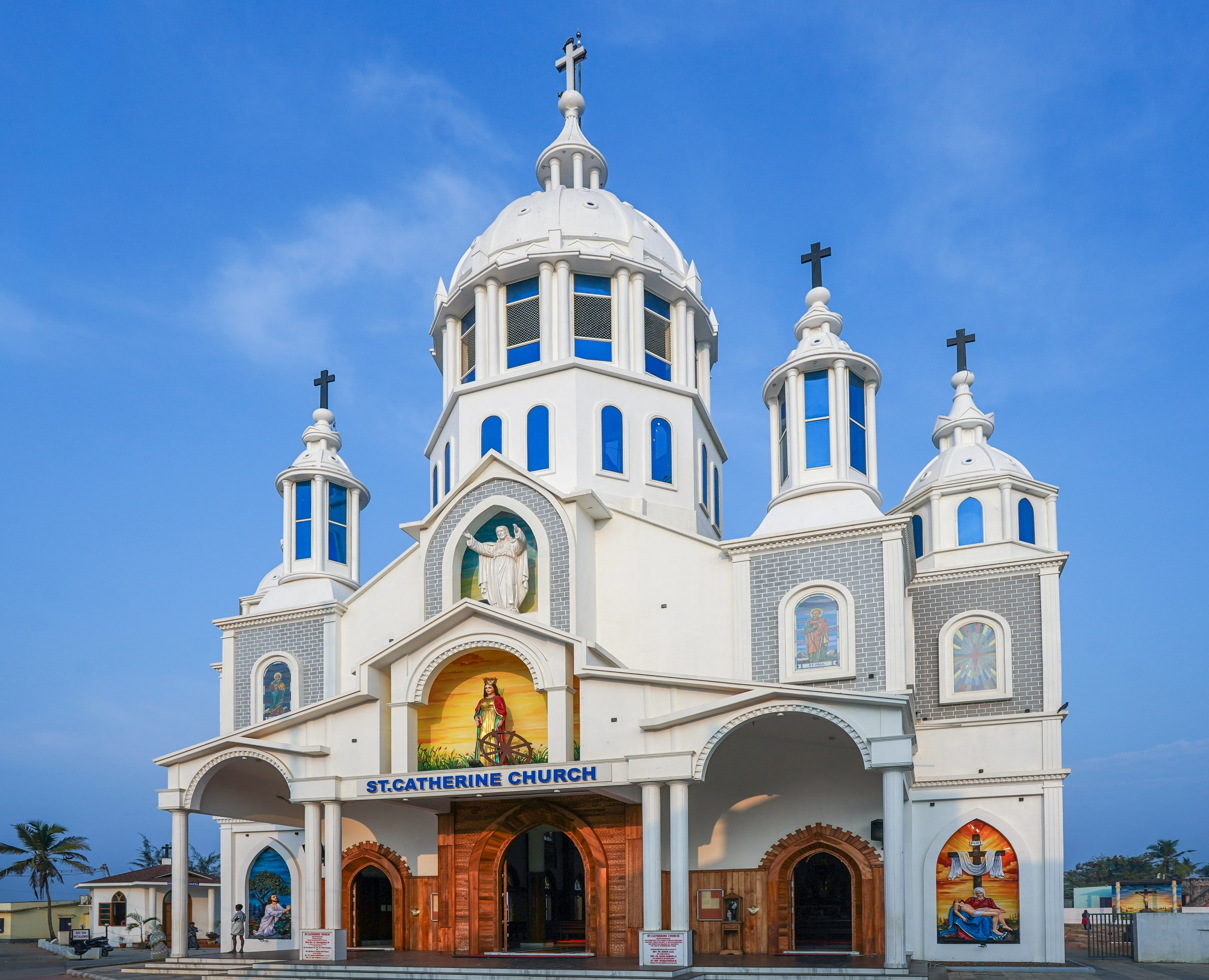
St. Catherine Church

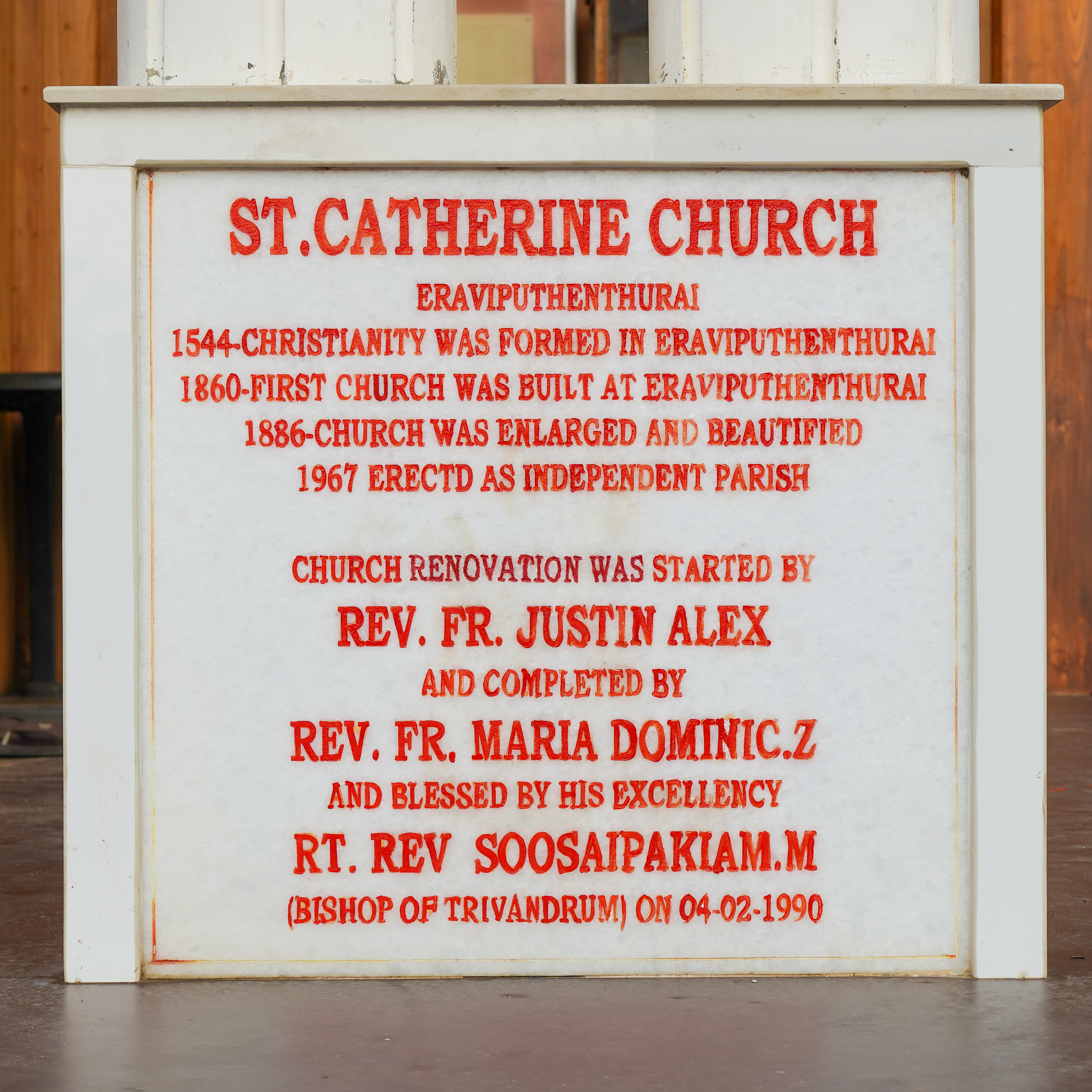
Plaque with history of St. Catherine Church

The Catholic Church has a presence in Eraviputhenthurai. The village's conversion may be traced back to not later than A.D. 1544 when St. Francis Xavier converted nearly 10,000 Mukkuvars (fishermen and women) living in thirteen villages along the coast from Pallam to Poovar. Immediately thereafter they pulled down their Hindu temple and idols. A cross was built and thatches were made for worship. In due course, they were converted into churches.

In 1600, the existing Thoothoor Parish Church was brought under the Padroado. Thoothoor Parish came under the Diocese of Cochin. In 1838, St. Thomas Church, Thoothoor and other adjacent coastal Churches from Pallithura to Erayumanthurai were brought under the Diocese of Varapuzha. Ultimately Thoothoor was brought under the Diocese of Cochin in 1850.

Under the Diocese of Cochin St. Catherine Church was built at Adthiyanthurai (Eraviputhenthurai). The Patroness was St. Catherine of Alexandria. The church was constructed by English missionaries. Later in the 19th century this village was flooded. The new village was named Puthenthurai (Puthen = New, Thurai = Coastal Village). The name of the village became Santa Catherina Puthenthurai)(St catherineputhenthurai).

In the 1860s a new Church was constructed, followed by another in 1886. The tower of this Church was destroyed by a storm. In the middle of the 20th century, Rev. Fr. Rayyapan Parithyal started to build another new Church. In 1968 Rev. Fr. Francis Neetany wanted to reconstruct the Altar, which was completed on 4 February 1990. It was blessed by Rt. Rev. Dr. Soosai Pakiyam., Bishop of Trivandrum Diocese.

In 2003 the tower was destroyed by a storm. Maintenance was started in 2003 by Rev. Fr. Stansilaus Theesmas and completed during the period of Rev. Fr. John Churchill Bas in November 2004.

=== St. Joseph's Shrine ===
In 1972, Dennis Kanakkapillai initiated to construct a Shrine for St. Joseph at Eravipuithenthurai. Mr. Alphonse Pirisant cooperated with him for the construction work and provided the fund for construction. They opened the Shrine that year and it was blessed by Rev. Fr. Francis Neetany.

Later on, reconstruction was started during the period of Rev. Fr. John Churchill Bas in 2004. The Face for the Shrine was planned by Mr. Robert Singh of Eraviputhenthurai. The work was started and new Shrine was opened on 1 May 2005 by Rev. Dr. Youhannon Mar Chrisostom, Bishop of Marthandam.

== Asha Sagar Convent ==
Eraviputhenthurai comes under the Archdiocese of Thiruvananthapuram. Asha Sagar was started in the year 1997 with two Sisters. Their congregation is Sisters of Charity of Bartoloma Capitation and Vincenza Gerosa. At first, the convent was an offshoot of Vallavila. On 4 April 2002 it became an independent community.

== Organisations in Eraviputhenthurai ==
=== Religious ===
- St. Catherine's Church
- St. Joseph's Shrine
- New Life Retreat Centre
- Asha Sager Convent

=== Education ===
- St. Joseph's Middle School
- St. Catherine's Pre-Kindergarten,
- Asha Sagar Pre-Primary School
- St. Joseph's Evening Tuition
- School for Intellectually disabled
- Nursery School

=== Other ===
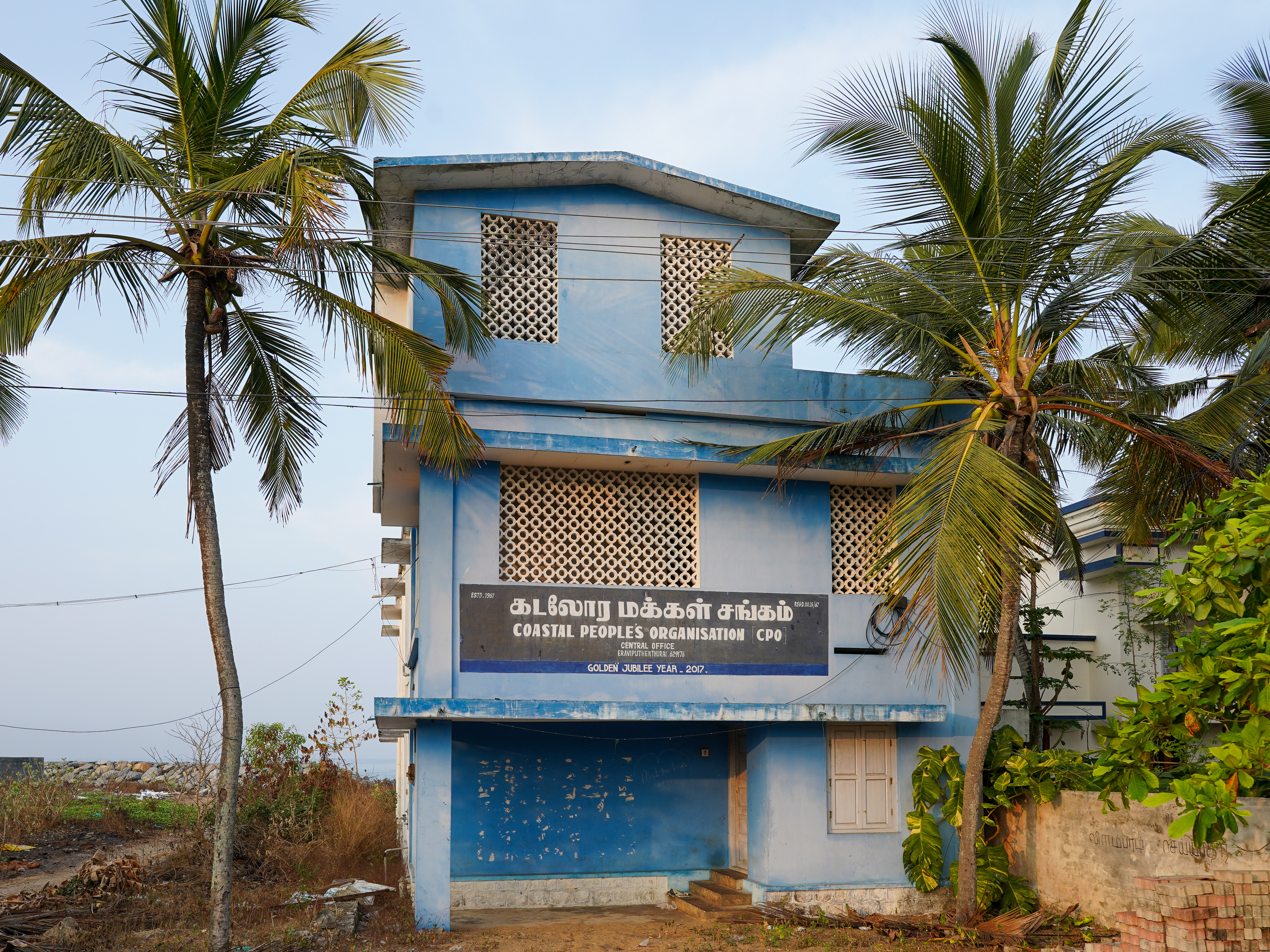
CPO Central Office

- Coastal People Organisation (CPO)
- Eraviputhenthurai Boat Union
- Kombriya Sabai
- CLC
- Basic Christian Community
- Legion of Mary
- Altar Boys
- Society of Saint Vincent De Paul
- Southern Catholic Youth Movement
- Jesus Youth
- Little Way Association
- St.Joseph's Womans Association (Sabai)
- Eraviputhenthurai Football Association
- St. Francis Arts and Sports Club & Library (F.A.S.C) ] Mother football club of Eraviputhenthurai. Since 1974
- St. Francis Animation and Social Centre (F.A.S.C)
- St. Catherine FC
- St. Catherine Library

== Transportation ==
The nearest airport is Thiruvananthapuram International Airport 45 km (28 mi). The nearest railway station is Parassala (PASA) (11.2 km (7.0 mi)) with others at Kuzhithurai (KZT) (15.6 km (9.7 mi)), Thiruvananthapuram Central Railway station (TVC) (38.9 km (24.2 mi)) and Nagercoil Junction Railway station (NCJ) (43.5 km (27.0 mi)).

== Notable people ==
- Michael Soosairaj, footballer
- Michael Regin, footballer

== See also ==
- Saint Catherine of Alexandria
