= List of ATK managers =

Atlético de Kolkata was a professional football club based in Kolkata, West Bengal, which played in the Indian Super League until its merger with the football division of Mohun Bagan AC in 2020. This list consists of all the head coaches of the team since its inception in 2014 till 2020. Player-managers are also included in the list. This list features all the statistics of each coach and their achievements with the club.

The first full time manager was Antonio López Habas in 2014 under whose guidance the club won its first ever league title in the very first season of the ISL.

== List of Managers (Head Coaches) - ATK ==
Name	Nat	From	To	G	W	D	L	GF	GA	Win %	Honours
Antonio López Habas	(Spain)	8 July 2014	20 December 2015	33	13	11	9	45	34	39.39	1 Indian Super League (2014)
José Francisco Molina	(Spain)	5 May 2016	18 December 2016	17	6	9	2	19	16	35.29	1 Indian Super League (2016)
Teddy Sheringham	(England)	14 July 2017	24 January 2018	10	3	3	4	7	12	30.00	
Ashley Westwood (interim)	(England)	24 January 2018	3 March 2018	7	0	1	6	8	18	0.00	
Robbie Keane (player-manager)	(Republic of Ireland)	4 March 2018	31 May 2018	3	2	0	1	6	4	66.67	
Steve Coppell	(England)	18 June 2018	30 April 2019	21	8	6	7	25	28	38.10	
Antonio López Habas	(Spain)	3 May 2019	31 May 2020	19	10	4	5	33	17	52.63	1 Indian Super League (2020)
