= Michael Soosairaj =

Indian footballer (born 1994)

Personal information
- Date of birth: 25 December 1994 (age 31)
- Place of birth: Eraviputhenthurai, Tamil Nadu
- Height: 1.74 m (5 ft 8 1/2 in)
- Positions: Winger; midfielder

Team information
- Current team: Forca Kochi

Youth career
- 2011–2016: Arrows Football Club

Senior career*
Years	Team	Apps	(Gls)
2016–2018	Chennai City	29	(5)
2018–2019	Jamshedpur	14	(4)
2019–2020	ATK	20	(3)
2020–2022	Mohun Bagan	6	(0)
2022–2024	Odisha	2	(0)
2024–2025	Gokulam Kerala	13	(1)
2025–	Forca Kochi		

International career
2019	India	1	(0)
- * Club domestic league appearances and goals as of 23:48, 12 February 2025 (UTC)

Michael Soosairaj (born 25 December 1994) is an Indian professional footballer who plays as a winger for the Super League Kerala club Forca Kochi.

== Career ==
=== Early career and Chennai City ===
Born in Eraviputhenthurai, Tamil Nadu, Soosairaj first moved to Chennai when he attended Madras Christian College. At the age of 10, he started training with his local football club/academy St. Catherine, one of the oldest football clubs in the state. He represented the college in Inter-University tournaments before joining Arrows Football Club of the CFA Senior Division. After spending time with Arrows, Soosairaj joined another CFA Senior Division side, Chennai City. He also played for Tamil Nadu in the Santosh Trophy.

In December 2016, Chennai City FC were announced as a direct-entry side into the I-League, India's top-tier football league. He made his professional debut for the club on 4 December 2017 in Chennai City's second match of the 2017–18 season against Gokulam Kerala. Pandiyan started and played the whole match as Chennai City drew 1–1. On 17 January 2017, Soosairaj made his professional debut in the I-League for Chennai City against DSK Shivajians. He came on as a 61st-minute substitute for Malsawmfela despite Chennai City losing 2–0.

On 8 April 2018, Soosairaj scored his first professional goal in the league against Minerva Punjab. His 41st-minute goal was the first in a 2–0 victory. He then scored his second goal of the season a few weeks later on 22 April against Churchill Brothers. This time, Soosairaj scored Chennai City's only goal in the 54th minute as they lost 5–1. The next season, Soosairaj scored his first brace, scoring twice against Churchill Brothers on 17 February 2018. His two goals contributed to a 3–1 victory for Chennai City. He then scored his third goal of the season a couple weeks later on 2 March against Minerva Punjab. His 5th-minute goal was the first in a 2–1 victory for Chennai City.

After the 2017–18 season, Soosairaj was named the league's best midfielder by the All India Football Federation.

=== Jamshedpur ===
On 9 March 2018, it was announced that Soosairaj had signed for Jamshedpur of the Indian Super League. He scored 4 goals in 14 matches during the 2018–19 season. He was brilliant throughout the season playing as a left or right winger . He earned a lot of admiration for his performance. He was one of the standout Indian players of the season, and his performances led to him gaining his first international call-up.

=== ATK ===
Before the start of the 2019–20 season, Indian Super League side ATK activated the release clause of Michael Soosairaj as ₹90 lakh (equivalent to ₹1.2 crore or €120,000 in 2026) Soosairaj scored against Mumbai City FC this season, assisting ATK in a 2–0 win.

=== Mohun Bagan ===
After the merger of ATK and Mohun Bagan, Soosairaj joined Mohun Bagan, and was included in twenty-two men squad by manager Antonio Lopez Habas for the team's 2021 AFC Cup inter-zonal semifinal match against Uzbek side Nasaf.

=== Odisha ===
On 28 May 2022, the Juggernauts secured the signature of Soosairaj, on a two-year deal.

== Personal life ==
His elder brother Michael Regin is also a professional footballer.

== Career statistics ==
=== Club ===
As of 12 February 2025

Club	Season	League			Cup		AFC		Total	
Club	Season	Division	Apps	Goals	Apps	Goals	Apps	Goals	Apps	Goals
Chennai City	2016–17	I-League	11	2	2 (Note: Appearance(s) in Super Cup)	0	—		13	2
Chennai City	2017–18	I-League	18	3	1	0	—		19	3
Chennai City	Total		29	5	3	0	0	0	32	5
Jamshedpur	2018–19	Indian Super League	14	4	0	0	—		14	4
ATK	2019–20	Indian Super League	20	3	0	0	—		20	3
Mohun Bagan	2020–21	Indian Super League	1	0	0	0	—		1	0
Mohun Bagan	2021–22	Indian Super League	5	0	0	0	1 (Note: Appearance(s) in AFC Cup)	0	6	0
Mohun Bagan	Total		6	0	0	0	1	0	7	0
Odisha	2022–23	Indian Super League	1	0	4 (Note: Appearance(s) in Durand Cup)	0	—		5	0
Odisha	2023–24	Indian Super League	1	0	0	0	1	0	2	0
Odisha	Total		2	0	4	0	1	0	7	0
Gokulam Kerala	2024–25	I-League	13	1	0	0	—		13	1
Career total			84	13	7	0	2	0	93	13

=== International ===
As of matches played till 5 June 2019

National team	Year	Apps	Goals
India	2019	1	0
Total		1	0

== Honours ==
India

- King's Cup third place: 2019

Individual

- I-League Best Midfielder: 2017–18
