= Edu García =

Spanish footballer

Personal information
- Full name: Eduardo García Martín
- Date of birth: 24 April 1990 (age 36)
- Place of birth: Zaragoza, Spain
- Height: 1.82 m (6 ft 0 in)
- Positions: Winger; attacking midfielder

Team information
- Current team: Ejea
- Number: 7

Youth career
- Helios
- Amistad
- 2002–2009: Zaragoza

Senior career*
Years	Team	Apps	(Gls)
2009–2012	Zaragoza B	44	(20)
2012–2013	Ebro	5	(1)
2013–2014	Ejea	41	(9)
2014–2016	Ebro	64	(24)
2016–2017	Zaragoza	27	(2)
2017–2018	Bengaluru	14	(2)
2018	Zhejiang Greentown	15	(3)
2019–2020	ATK	22	(9)
2020–2021	Mohun Bagan	11	(1)
2021–2022	Hyderabad	11	(2)
2022–2025	Shenzhen Peng City	92	(31)
2026–	Ejea	8	(0)
- * Club domestic league appearances and goals as of 14 May 2026

Eduardo "Edu" García Martín (Spanish pronunciation: [eˈðwaɾðo ˈeðu ɣaɾˈθi.a maɾˈtin]; (Note: In isolation, García is pronounced [ɡaɾˈθi.a].) born 24 April 1990) is a Spanish professional footballer who plays as a winger or an attacking midfielder for Segunda Federación club Ejea. He has played in a host of different countries, including China, India and his native Spain.

== Club career ==
García was born in Zaragoza, Aragon, García joined Real Zaragoza's youth setup in 2002, aged 12, after spells at CN Helios Fútbol and UD Amistad. He made his debut with the former's reserves during the 2009–10 campaign, in Tercera División.

In 2012, García rejected a contract extension from the Maños and signed for CD Ebro also in the fourth division. The following year, he moved to fellow league team SD Ejea, along with former Ebro manager José Luis Loreto.

In July 2014, García and his manager Loreto returned to Ebro. He scored a career-best 16 goals during his first season, which ended in promotion to Segunda División B, and added a further eight in his second.

On 10 August 2016, García returned to Zaragoza, signing a two-year contract now with the first team. He made his professional debut on 7 September, starting in a 1–2 Copa del Rey home loss against Real Valladolid.

García made his Segunda División debut on 17 September 2016, replacing Jordi Xumetra in a 2–0 home win against AD Alcorcón. He scored his first goal in the category on 13 November, netting the last in a home success over CD Mirandés for the same scoreline.

=== Indian Super League ===
==== Bengaluru FC ====
On 3 September 2017, García signed a one-year contract with Indian Super League club Bengaluru FC. On 19 November 2017, he made his first team debut against Mumbai City FC, scoring the first goal in the 2–0 victory and dedicated the goal to the club's assistant manager Carles Cuadrat. On 9 February 2018, he scored in his final match for the club in a 2–0 win over Goa.

=== China League One ===
==== Zhejiang Energy Greentown ====
On 23 February 2018, he joined Chinese club Zhejiang Energy Greentown for an undisclosed fee. On 24 March 2018, he made his debut for the club in a 2–1 loss over Zhejiang Yiteng. He scored his first goal for the club, on 1 April 2018 against Shanghai Shenxin. He made his final appearance for the club on 19 September 2018 against Wuhan Zall. He went on to make 15 appearances for the club scoring 3 goals in the process.

=== Return to the ISL ===
==== ATK ====
On 23 December 2018, García returned to the Indian Super League with ATK during the January transfer window. On 25 January 2019, he scored a free-kick on his debut in a 1–1 draw against Kerala Blasters. He scored three goals in eight appearances for ATK in his first short season. In his second season with the club, he came on as a substitute and scored a brace against Hyderabad. On 14 March 2020, he scored a goal in the final against Chennaiyin FC to win his first career league title. He finished the season with 6 goals in 16 appearances for the club.

==== ATK Mohun Bagan ====
On 6 August 2020, Garcia signed a two-year contract with newly merged ATK Mohun Bagan. On 20 November 2020, he made his debut for the club against Kerala Blasters in a 1–0 win. He was injured for most of the season and his contract was mutually terminated by the club.

=== Return to China League One ===
==== Shenzhen Peng City ====
García joined Sichuan Jiuniu on 21 April 2022. On 10 December 2025, the club annouanced that García's departure after the 2025 season.

=== Back to Spain ===
On 13 January 2026, García returned to Spain and joined Segunda Federación club Ejea.

== Career statistics ==
=== Clubs ===
As of match played 3 May 2026

Appearances and goals by club, season and competition
Club	Season	League			National cup		Continental		Total	
Club	Season	Division	Apps	Goals	Apps	Goals	Apps	Goals	Apps	Goals
Ebro	2014–15	Tercera División	34	16	—		—		34	16
Ebro	2015–16	Segunda División B	30	8	1	0	—		31	8
Ebro	Total		64	24	1	0	—		65	24
Real Zaragoza	2016–17	Segunda División	27	2	1	0	–		28	2
Bengaluru FC	2017–18	Indian Super League	14	2	—		—		14	2
Zhejiang Greentown	2018	China League One	15	3	—		—		15	3
ATK	2018–19	Indian Super League	6	3	2	0	—		8	3
ATK	2019–20	Indian Super League	17	6	—		—		17	6
ATK	Total		23	9	2	0	—		25	9
Mohun Bagan	2020–21	Indian Super League	11	1	—		—		11	1
Hyderabad	2021–22	Indian Super League	11	2	—		—		11	2
Sichuan Jiuniu/ Shenzhen Peng City	2022	China League One	19	6	1	0	—		20	6
Sichuan Jiuniu/ Shenzhen Peng City	2023	China League One	25	10	0	0	—		25	10
Sichuan Jiuniu/ Shenzhen Peng City	2024	Chinese Super League	23	9	1	1	—		24	10
Sichuan Jiuniu/ Shenzhen Peng City	2025	Chinese Super League	25	6	0	0	—		25	6
Sichuan Jiuniu/ Shenzhen Peng City	Total		92	31	2	1	—		94	32
Ejea	2025–26	Segunda Federación	8	0	—		—		8	0
Career total			265	74	6	1	0	0	271	75

== Honours ==
ATK

- Indian Super League: 2019–20

Mohun Bagan

- Indian Super League runner-up: 2020–21
