= ATK (football club) =

Former Indian association football club based in Kolkata

- Full name: ATK Football Club
- Nickname: ATK
- Short name: ATKFC
- Founded: 7 May 2014; 12 years ago (as Atlético de Kolkata); June 2017; 9 years ago (as ATK after ending partnership with Atlético Madrid)
- Dissolved: 1 June 2020; 6 years ago (disbanded for Mohun Bagan SG)
- Ground: Salt Lake Stadium; Bidhannagar, West Bengal
- Capacity: 85,000
- Owner(s): Kolkata Games and Sports Pvt. Ltd.
Home colours	Away colours

ATK (formerly Atlético de Kolkata in association with Atlético Madrid) was an Indian professional football club based in Kolkata, West Bengal. The club competed in the ISL, the top flight of Indian football. They were the champions during the inaugural 2014 season, 2016 and 2019–20 seasons respectively.

The club was owned by Kolkata Games and Sports Pvt. Ltd. which consists of former Indian cricket captain Sourav Ganguly, alongside businessmen Harshavardhan Neotia, Sanjiv Goenka and Utsav Parekh. Initially, for the first three seasons, La Liga club Atlético Madrid was also a co-owner; later Goenka bought the shares. After the end of their partnership with the Spanish giant, Atlético de Kolkata has been rechristened to ATK in July 2017. The team's name and colours are derived from their former Spanish partner.

Under coach Antonio López Habas, Atlético hosted and won the first match of the ISL. They won the inaugural season, beating Kerala Blasters 0–1 in the final. Two years later, under José Francisco Molina, the team won on penalties against the same opponent in the final. ATK won 3 ISL trophies, last by defeating Chennaiyin FC in the 2020 final.

On 16 January 2020, it was announced that the RPSG Group (KGSPL), along with former cricketer Sourav Ganguly and businessmen Utsav Parekh, acquired an 80% stake in Mohun Bagan Football Club (India) Pvt. Ltd. the legal entity owning the football division of I-League club, Mohun Bagan. After their seventh season ATK Football Club was officially disbanded on 1 June 2020 and merged with Kolkata based Mohun Bagan, entered the Indian Super League in the 2020–21 season with name ATK Mohun Bagan. In 2023, after severe protests from the Mohun Bagan supporters, KGSPL removed ATK and changed the name of the legal entity to Mohun Bagan Super Giant.

== History ==
=== Foundation ===
In March 2014, it was announced that the All India Football Federation, the national federation for football in India, and IMG-Reliance would be accepting bids for ownership of eight of nine selected cities for the upcoming ISL, an eight-team franchise league modeled along the lines of the Indian Premier League cricket tournament. On 13 April 2014, it was announced that Sourav Ganguly, Harshavardhan Neotia, Sanjiv Goenka, Utsav Parekh, and Spanish La Liga side Atlético Madrid had won the bid for the Kolkata franchise. It turned out to be the most expensive franchise, being purchased for 180 million (around US$3 million). On 7 May 2014, the team was officially launched as Atlético de Kolkata.

=== Inaugural season ===

Lineup against Kerala Blasters FC in 2014 Indian Super League final

The club signed their first player on 4 July 2014 with the acquisition of former Real Madrid midfielder Borja Fernández. The team then went on to sign two more Spaniards: their first head coach, Antonio López Habas, and marquee player, former UEFA Champions League winner Luis García, on 8 July 2014. Luis García was named the first marquee player of the season.

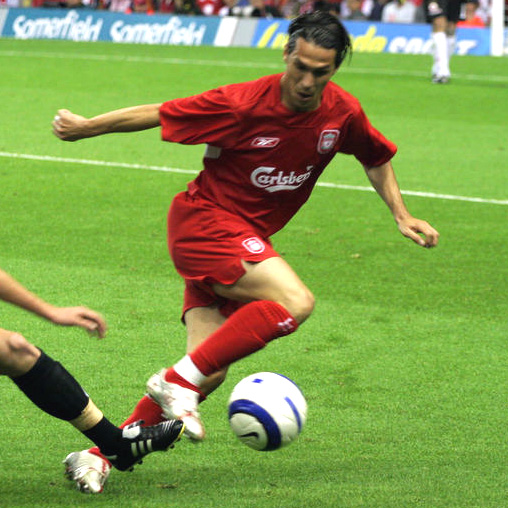
Luis Garcia was the first marquee player of the league

On 6 September, the team bolstered their midfield with the acquisition of Mamunul Islam, captain of the Bangladesh national team, who stated that the move would help relations between East Bengal (Bangladesh) and West Bengal.

The club played their first match on 12 October 2014 at home against Mumbai City FC in the opening ISL match. Fikru Teferra scored the first goal in team and league history in the 27th minute as Atlético de Kolkata went on to win 3–0.

By finishing third in the league, the club qualified for the end-of-season play-offs, where they advanced via a penalty shootout past FC Goa in the semi-finals after a goalless draw. At the final against the Kerala Blasters at the DY Patil Stadium in Mumbai, Atlético won 1–0 with an added-time goal by Mohammed Rafique. At the end of season awards, García was named the Most Exciting Player.

=== 2015 season ===
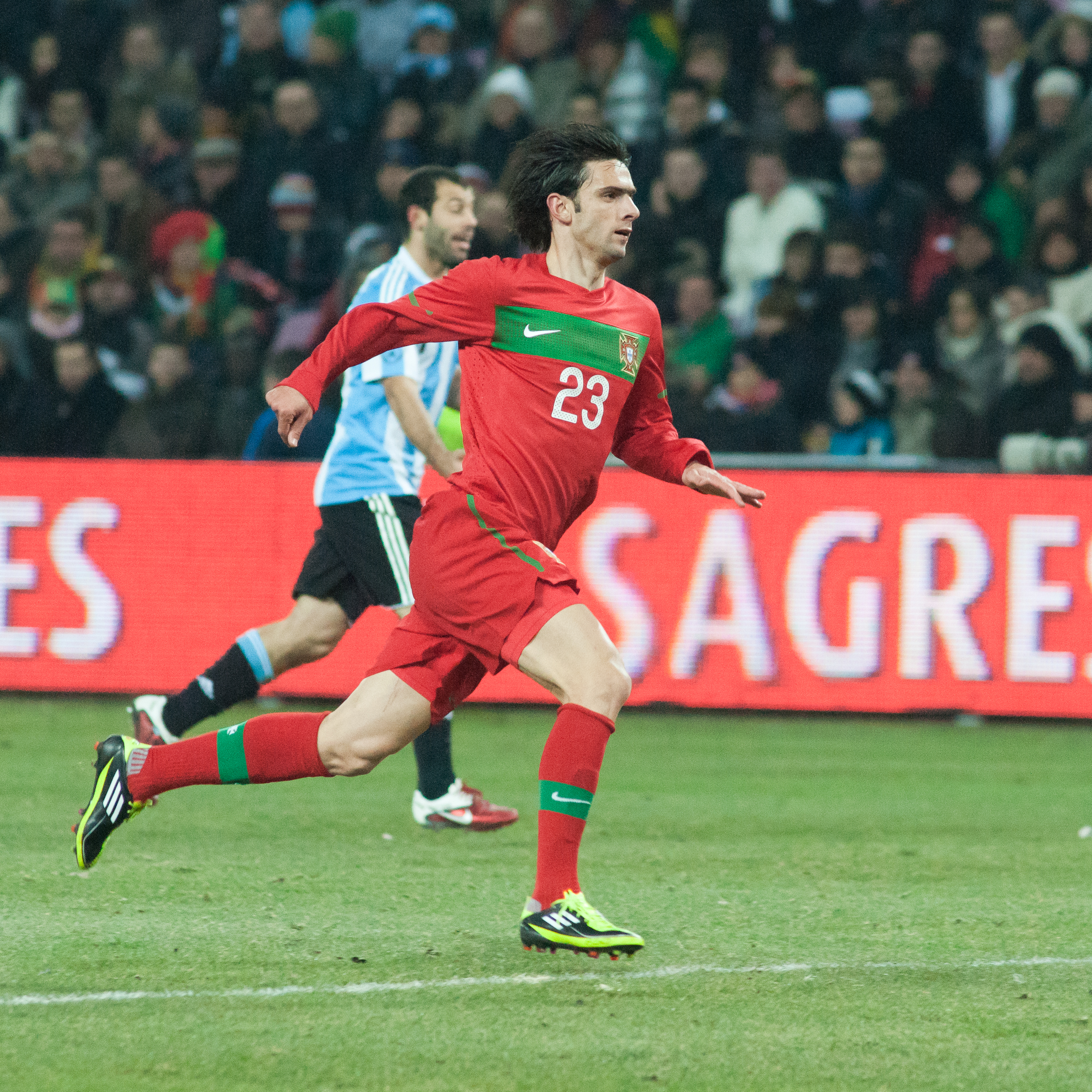
Hélder Postiga was the club's marquee player in the 2015 season

On 5 June 2015, the team acquired Canadian international forward Iain Hume, whose five goals had helped Kerala to the final of the previous season. On 29 July, with García released due to his injury record, the team brought in Portugal international forward Hélder Postiga as their new marquee player; aged 32, he became the youngest such player in the league. García's role as captain was taken on by his compatriot Borja.

Postiga scored twice in Atlético's first game of the season, a 3–2 win at Chennaiyin FC, but was substituted later in the match due to injury, and missed the rest of the campaign. Hume scored two hat-tricks in November, in 4–1 wins against Mumbai City, and FC Pune City. The latter result made the team the first to qualify for the play-offs, where they lost 4–2 on aggregate to Chennaiyin.

=== 2016 season ===

Lineup against Kerala Blasters FC in 2016 Indian Super League final

In March 2016, it was reported that López Habas would leave the club due to concerns over his ₹23.5 million ($350,000) annual salary. On 25 April, he left for Pune. On 3 May, he was replaced by another Spaniard, former Villarreal manager José Francisco Molina. Postiga returned to be the marquee again, but suffered another long-term injury early into the second game of the season. The club's ownership admitted that they had wanted a different marquee due to his record, but had been unable to sign one.

Atlético de Kolkata finished in fourth place, taking the final position in the finals, and were drawn against first-place Mumbai in the semi-finals. They hosted a 3–2 win in the first leg, with all goals in the first half, including two by Hume, and advanced with a goalless draw in the second leg. In the final, away to Kerala on 18 December, Kolkata fell behind to a goal by their former player Mohammed Rafi, and equalised before half-time with a header by defender Henrique Sereno. The game went to penalties, with Hume having Atlético's first attempt saved by Graham Stack, but Elhadji Ndoye missed for Kerala and Debjit Majumder saved from Cédric Hengbart to win Kolkata the title.

=== 2017–18 season ===
After the separation from Spanish club Atlético Madrid, most of the squad was not retained for the new season. On 14 July 2017, ATK appointed former England international striker Teddy Sheringham as their head coach for the upcoming season. While former Bengaluru FC head coach Ashley Westwood was appointed as the technical director for the club. On 4 August, the team acquired former Irish international forward Robbie Keane as their new marquee player.

On 24 January 2018, Sheringham was sacked by ATK after winning only three of his ten games in charge and appointed Ashley Westwood as their interim coach. For the first time in four years the club could not make it to the playoffs, but avoided last place by registering a 1–0 win over NorthEast United FC in the final game, Robbie Keane netting the deciding goal.

Robbie Keane was named the player-manager for the upcoming cup fixtures and they started their Super Cup campaign with a 4–1 win over I-League club Chennai City FC, but failed to make it to the quarter-finals after a 3–1 defeat against FC Goa.

=== 2018–19 season ===
After a forgettable season, ATK appointed Sanjoy Sen as their mentor to recruit national players. The former Mohun Bagan AC head coach roped in some of his own former players who he had the experience of working with, along with former ATK players Arnab Mondal and Cavin Lobo. They mainly focused on more local players and it served as the main foundation for building the squad for the season. Former Manchester United striker Steve Coppell was named as the head coach for the season. Coppell had the experience of managing ISL clubs before such as Kerala Blasters FC and Jamshedpur FC. Under him the team finished 6th in the league, winning 6 games.

In the Super Cup the team reached the semi-finals. They defeated Real Kashmir 3–1 on their way to finish 4th.

=== 2019–20 season ===

Lineup against Chennaiyin FC in 2020 Indian Super League final

ATK became the first club to win the ISL Cup thrice after they defeated Chennaiyin FC 3–1 in the final of the 2019–20 Indian Super League.

ATK was officially disbanded after 2019-20 season.

== Crest ==
On 7 July, the team's jersey and logo were unveiled by West Bengal Chief Minister Mamata Banerjee at the Nabanna building, temporary headquarters of the state's secretariat. The logo featured a hybrid Bengal tiger–phoenix, with the latter element being symbolic of perpetuity, due to the footballing heritage in Kolkata. Five stars above the crest symbolise the five owners of the club. The shield is striped with tigers' stripes.

== Stadium ==
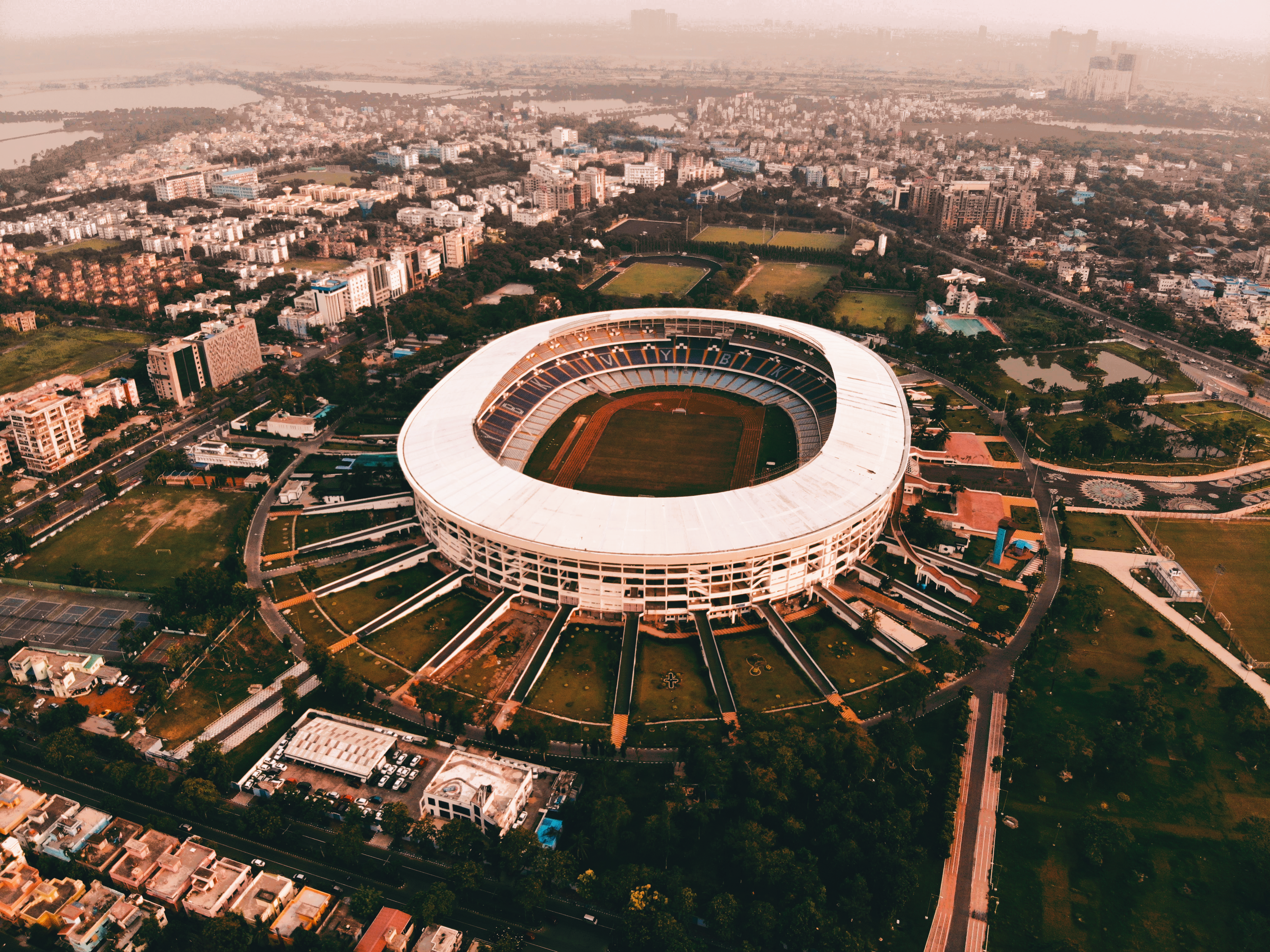
Yuva Bharati Krirangan (Salt Lake Stadium)

The 85,000 capacity Salt Lake Stadium was the home ground of Atlético de Kolkata. The multi-purpose stadium, located in Salt Lake City (Bidhan Nagar), in the outskirts of Kolkata, is the largest stadium in the country. The Salt Lake Stadium is owned by the West Bengal State Government. Salt Lake Stadium, officially known as Vivekananda Yuba Bharati Krirangan (VYBK), is the largest stadium in India by seating capacity. Before its renovation in 2011, it was the second-largest football stadium in the world, having a seating capacity of 120,000. Prior to the construction and opening of Rungrado May Day Stadium in 1989, it was the largest football stadium in the world. The stadium hosted the final match of the 2017 FIFA U-17 World Cup, alongside hosting other matches of the tournament.

Atlético de Kolkata played their first two seasons at Salt Lake Stadium, but in the 2016 season, they had to move to Rabindra Sarobar Stadium due to the unavailability of Salt Lake Stadium, which was shortlisted as one of the venues for the 2017 FIFA U-17 World Cup. During the first season, Atlético de Kolkata has achieved an average home attendance of 45,172 per match and the most attended game of the season with 65,000 people.

During the second season, 405,659 people attended the home matches of Kolkata (most by any club in that season) with an average of 50,707 per match, and they held the most attended game of the season for the second year in a row with 68,340 people. During the third season, an average of 11,703 people per match attended the home matches of Kolkata.

The fourth season saw a formidable decline in the average attendance in the home matches of Kolkata due to the low capacity of Rabindra sarobar stadium. The lowest attendance count was 3,165 whereas the highest was 32,816. In their nine home games, ATK managed to pull an average attendance of just 12,629.

Year	GP	Cumulative	High	Low	Mean
2014	8	316,195	65,000	21,550	45,171
2015	8	405,659	68,340	35,437	50,707
2016	8	93,627	12,575	10,589	11,703
2017–18	9	113,661	32,816	3,165	12,629
2018–19	9	160,804	41,202	5,321	17,867
2019–20	10	258,469	50,102	8,690	25,847

== Supporters ==
ATK, and the ISL in general, were initially announced with a mixed reception among football fans in Kolkata. Some locals feared that it could overshadow the development of players at the city's two long-established I-League clubs, while others saw the new franchise as a way to unite both sets of I-League supporters, who would be drawn together further by the involvement of Ganguly, who is idolised across the state.

Ahead of the second season, the franchise accredited the ATK Fans Fraternity (ATKFF), whose ₹800 membership includes a home season ticket and an official jersey. The fraternity offered 4,000 memberships in an exclusive part of the stadium. Firstpost journalist Pulasta Dhar described it as a "brilliant" deal that could be replicated in order to help all ISL clubs fill their stadia.

== Ownership and finances ==
The Kolkata Games and Sports Pvt. Ltd is a consortium established to oversee the administration and operations of ATK of the Indian Super League. The consortium is made up of former India cricket captain Sourav Ganguly, businessmen Harshavardhan Neotia, Sanjiv Goenka, and Utsav Parekh.

In October 2015, Kolkata-based Birla Tyres agreed a deal to be the principal sponsors for the club's second and third seasons.

== Last technical staff ==
More: List of ATK managers

As of 15 January 2019

Position	Name
Manager	(Spain) Antonio López Habas
Assistant Manager	(Spain) Manuel Perez Cascallana
Assistant Manager	(India) Sanjoy Sen
Goalkeeper Coach	(Spain) Ángel Pindado
Physiotherapists	(Spain) Luis Alfonso Martinez
Physiotherapists	(India) Avinandan Chatterjee
Physiotherapists	(India) Noel Augustine
Physical Trainer	(Spain) Alvaro Ros Bernal
Team Doctor	(India) Rafi Bhati
Masseur	(India) Mohammed Kashif
Masseur	(India) Shaikh Siraj
Video Analyst	(India) Subham Sen
Player Recruitment Head	(India) Sujay Sharma
Team Manager	(India) Avishek Bhattacharjee
Kit Manager	(India) Anirban Biswas

== Management ==
As of 8 July 2018

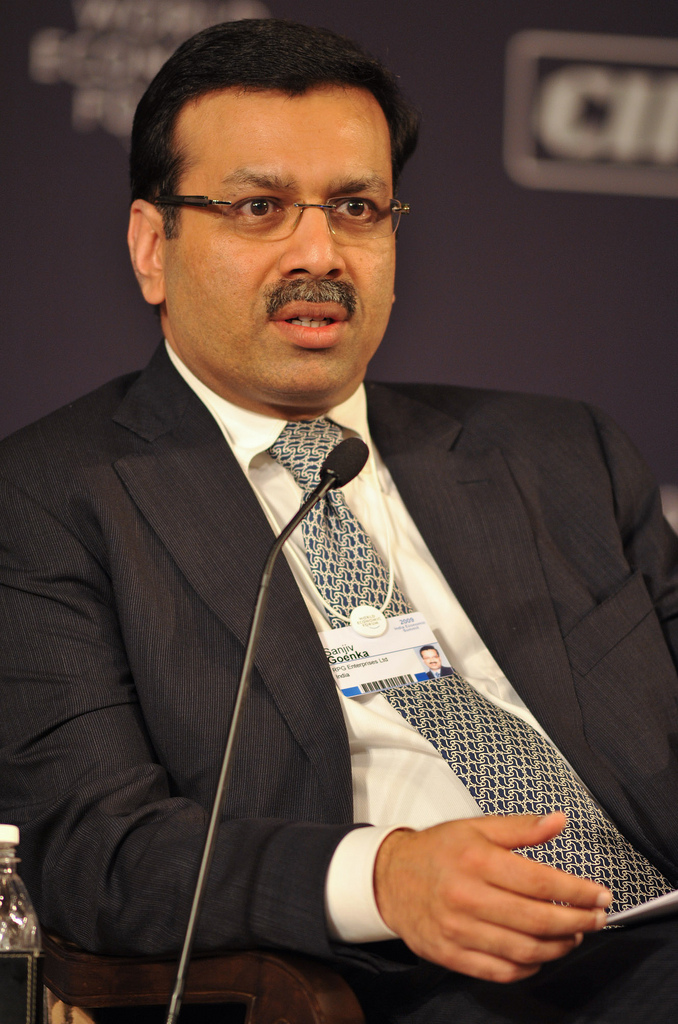
Sanjiv Goenka was the chairman of ATK

Position	Name
Director (Technical Area)	Subrata Talukdar
Director	Saharsh Parekh
Director	Subhrangshu Chakraborty
Director	Sunil Bhandari

Position	Name
Owner	Kolkata Games and Sports Pvt. Ltd.
Chairman	Sanjiv Goenka
CEO	Raghu Iyer
CFO	Vinay Chopra
managing director	Sudip Ghosh
Head of Advisory committee	Anjan Chowdhury
Finance Controller	Somshuvra Ghosh
Operations Executive	Rhitam Chatterjee
Operations Coordinator	Shubham Ghosh
Head of Business Operations	Rohit Katyal
Infrastructure Operations Manager	Rahul Dutta
Liaison Officer	Saptarshi Chowdhury
Social Media Manager	Raunak Ghosal
Digital Content Executive	Sagnik Kundu
Academy Director	Joydeep Chakraborty
Grassroots Incharge	Ashish Sarkar
Fan Engagement Manager	Saptarshi Bakshi

== Statistics and records ==
=== Season-by-season ===
Season	Indian Super League								ISL Playoffs	Domestic cup (various)		Asian club competitions
Season	Pos.	Pl.	W	D	L	GF	GA	Pts	ISL Playoffs	Domestic cup (various)		Asian club competitions
2014	3rd	14	4	7	3	16	13	19	Winners	(Note: ISL clubs weren't considered for participation in Federation Cup.)		(Note: Indian Super League was not an official league until 2017, thus ISL clubs were unable to participate in tournaments organised by AFC till then.)
2015	2nd	14	7	2	5	26	17	23	Semi-finalists	(Note: ISL clubs weren't considered for participation in Federation Cup.)		(Note: Indian Super League was not an official league until 2017, thus ISL clubs were unable to participate in tournaments organised by AFC till then.)
2016	4th	14	4	8	2	16	14	20	Winners	(Note: ISL clubs weren't considered for participation in Federation Cup.)		(Note: Indian Super League was not an official league until 2017, thus ISL clubs were unable to participate in tournaments organised by AFC till then.)
2017–18	9th	18	4	4	10	16	30	16	—	Super Cup	Round of 16	(Note: Indian Super League was not an official league until 2017, thus ISL clubs were unable to participate in tournaments organised by AFC till then.)
2018–19	6th	18	6	6	6	18	22	24	—	Super Cup	Semifinalist	
2019–20	2nd	18	10	4	4	33	16	34	Winners	Durand Cup	2nd of 4 (Group Stage)	

=== Head coaches record ===
As of 1 January 2017

Name	Nationality	From	To	P	W	D	L	GF	GA	Win%
Antonio López Habas	Spain	8 July 2014	20 December 2015	33	13	11	9	45	34	39.39
José Francisco Molina	Spain	5 May 2016	18 December 2016	17	6	9	2	20	17	35.29
Teddy Sheringham	England	14 July 2017	24 January 2018	10	3	3	4	7	12	30.00
Ashley Westwood (interim)	England	24 January 2018	3 March 2018	7	0	1	6	8	18	0.00
Robbie Keane (player-manager)	Ireland	4 March 2018	31 May 2018	3	2	0	1	6	4	66.67
Steve Coppell	England	18 June 2018	30 April 2019	21	8	6	7	25	28	38.10
Antonio López Habas	Spain	3 May 2019	31 May 2020	21	12	4	5	39	19	57.14

=== Team records ===
==== Most goals ====
Rank	Player	Goals
1	(Canada) Iain Hume	18
2	(Fiji) Roy Krishna	15
3	(Spain) Edu García	9
4	(Republic of Ireland) Robbie Keane	8
5	(Spain) Manuel Lanzarote	7
5	(Australia) David Williams	7
7	(India) Balwant Singh	6
8	(India) Arata Izumi	5
8	(Ethiopia) Fikru Teferra	5
8	(South Africa) Sameehg Doutie	5

==== Most appearances ====
Rank	Player	Appearances
1	(India) Jayesh Rane	52
2	(India) Prabir Das	48
3	(Spain) Borja Fernández	47
4	(India) Arnab Mondal	46
5	(India) Pritam Kotal	42
6	(India) Arindam Bhattacharya	38
7	(Botswana) Ofentse Nato	31
8	(India) Debjit Majumder	30
8	(Canada) Iain Hume	30
8	(India) Hitesh Sharma	30

== Honours ==
ATK's honours include the following:

- Indian Super League (as tournament) (Note: For first three seasons, ISL was considered as just as a tournament, but not as league. Before fourth season, AFC recognised ISL as an official top tier league along with I-League and from 9th season it's considered as only top tier league.)
  - Champions (2): 2014, 2016
- Indian Super League (as top-tier league)
  - Champions (1): 2019–20

== See also ==
- List of ATK players
- List of ATK records and statistics
- List of football clubs in Kolkata
- List of Indian Super League records and statistics
