= List of FC Goa players =

Football Club Goa is a professional association football club based in Goa, India, that plays in Indian Super League. The club was formed in 2014 and played its first competitive match on 15 October 2014, when it lost 2–1 to Chennaiyin FC. The club has never won ISL titles but appeared crowned as the champions of the Super Cup.

== List of players ==
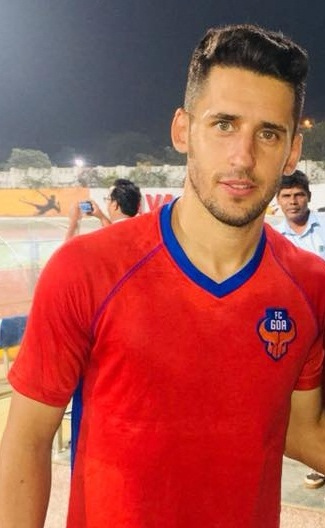
Coro was the leading scorer in the ISL and continues to be the leading scorer for FC Goa

The list includes all the players registered under a FC Goa contract. Some players might not have featured in a professional game for the club.

Name	Nat	Position	FC GOA career	Apps	Goals	Ref
Robert Pires	(France)	Midfielder	2014	8	1	
Jan Šeda	(Czech Republic)	Goalkeeper	2014	14	0	
André Santos	(Brazil)	Midfielder	2014	12	4	
Grégory Arnolin	(Martinique)	Defender	2014–2016	39	3	
Youness Bengelloun	(France)	Defender	2014	13	2	
Tolgay Özbey	(Australia)	Forward	2014	9	2	
Bruno Pinheiro	(Portugal)	Midfielder	2014, 2017–2018	26	0	
Miroslav Slepička	(Czech Republic)	Forward	2014	10	5	
Miguel Herlein	(Portugal)	Forward	2014	5	0	
Edgar Marcelino	(Portugal)	Midfielder	2014	3	1	
Ranti Martins	(Nigeria)	Forward	2014	8	0	
Zohib Islam Amiri	(Afghanistan)	Defender	2014	9	0	
Debabrata Roy	(India)	Defender	2014–2016	29	0	
Narayan Das	(India)	Defender	2014, 2017–2018	45	0	
Rowilson Rodrigues	(India)	Defender	2014	1	0	
Peter Carvalho	(India)	Midfielder	2014	8	0	
Alwyn George	(India)	Midfielder	2014	1	0	
Halicharan Narzary	(India)	Midfielder	2014	3	0	
Bikramjit Singh	(India)	Midfielder	2014	21	0	
Gabriel Fernandes	(India)	Midfielder	2014	8	0	
Mandar Rao Desai	(India)	Midfielder	2014–2020	100	5	
Romeo Fernandes	(India)	Midfielder	2014–2017, 2021	38	7	
Prabir Das	(India)	Defender	2014	1	0	
Jewel Raja	(India)	Midfielder	2014	9	1	
Clifford Miranda	(India)	Midfielder	2014	10	0	
Laxmikant Kattimani	(India)	Goalkeeper	2014–2019	41	0	
Pronay Halder	(India)	Midfielder	2014–2015, 2017–2018	23	0	
Gurpreet Singh Chabal	(India)	Goalkeeper	2014	—	—	
Lúcio	(Brazil)	Defender	2015–2016	19	0	
Luciano Sabrosa	(Brazil)	Defender	2015–2016	10	0	
Léo Moura	(Brazil)	Midfielder	2015	16	2	
Reinaldo	(Brazil)	Forward	2015–2016	17	7	
Rafael Coelho	(Brazil)	Forward	2015–2016	16	7	
Jofre	(Spain)	Midfielder	2015–2016	23	6	
Dudu	(Nigeria)	Forward	2015	7	4	
Darryl Duffy	(Scotland)	Forward	2015	4	0	
Jonatan Lucca	(Brazil)	Midfielder	2015	16	3	
Andrade	(Brazil)	Goalkeeper	2015	5	0	
Victor Simões	(Brazil)	Forward	2015	—	—	
Raju Gaikwad	(India)	Defender	2015–2016	23	0	
Semboi Haokip	(India)	Forward	2015	6	3	
Denson Devadas	(India)	Midfielder	2015	8	0	
Victorino Fernandes	(India)	Forward	2015	3	0	
Nicolau Colaco	(India)	Defender	2015	4	0	
Keenan Almeida	(India)	Defender	2015–2016	11	1	
Chinadorai Sabeeth	(India)	Forward	2015	8	0	
Joaquim Abranches	(India)	Forward	2015	1	0	
Luis Barreto	(India)	Goalkeeper	2015	—	—	
Rafael Dumas	(Brazil)	Defender	2016	11	0	
Richarlyson	(Brazil)	Midfielder	2016	12	1	
Matheus Gonçalves	(Brazil)	Midfielder	2016	13	0	
Júlio César	(Brazil)	Forward	2016	11	1	
Fulganco Cardozo	(India)	Defender	2016	5	1	
Pratesh Shirodkar	(India)	Midfielder	2016–2019	8	1	
Sanjay Balmuchu	(India)	Midfielder	2016	11	0	
Sahil Tavora	(India)	Midfielder	2016	6	2	
Robin Singh	(India)	Forward	2016	10	1	
Subhasish Roy Chowdhury	(India)	Goalkeeper	2016	4	0	
Sukhdev Patil	(India)	Goalkeeper	2016	—	—	
Denzil Franco	(India)	Defender	2016	—	—	
Coro	(Spain)	Forward	2017–2020	64	55	
Sergio Juste	(Spain)	Defender	2017–2018	13	1	
Ahmed Jahouh	(Morocco)	Midfielder	2017–2020	56	1	
Edu Bedia	(Spain)	Midfielder	2017–present	86	12	
Manu Lanzarote	(Spain)	Midfielder	2017–2018	19	13	
Manuel Arana	(Spain)	Midfielder	2017–2018	10	3	
Adrián Colunga	(Spain)	Forward	2017–2018	2	1	
Naveen Kumar	(India)	Goalkeeper	2017–present	25	0	
Amey Ranawade	(India)	Defender	2017, 2019–2020	3	0	
Sana Singh	(India)	Defender	2017–2020	20	0	
Mohamed Ali	(India)	Defender	2017–present	31	0	
Seriton Fernandes	(India)	Defender	2017–present	91	1	
Anthony D'Souza	(India)	Midfielder	2017–2018	2	0	
Mohammad Yasir	(India)	Midfielder	2017–2018	1	0	
Brandon Fernandes	(India)	Midfielder	2017–present	78	11	
Manvir Singh	(India)	Forward	2017–2020	52	4	
Liston Colaco	(India)	Forward	2017–2019	14	0	
Omkar Landge	(India)	Forward	2017–2019	11	8	
Jonathan Cardozo	(India)	Midfielder	2017–2018	1	0	
Bruno Colaço	(India)	Goalkeeper	2017–2018	1	0	
Jovel Martins	(India)	Defender	2017–2018	—	—	
Hugo Boumous	(France)	Midfielder	2018–2020	47	20	
Mark Sifneos	(Netherlands)	Forward	2018	7	1	
Mourtada Fall	(Senegal)	Defender	2018–2020	43	9	
Carlos Peña	(Spain)	Defender	2018–2020	43	2	
Miguel Palanca	(Spain)	Midfielder	2018	7	3	
Mohammad Nawaz	(India)	Goalkeeper	2018–2021	47	0	
Princeton Rebello	(India)	Midfielder	2018–present	33	1	
Saviour Gama	(India)	Defender	2018–present	48	2	
Nirmal Chhetri	(India)	Defender	2018–2019	1	0	
Lenny Rodrigues	(India)	Midfielder	2018–2021	55	2	
Jackichand Singh	(India)	Midfielder	2018–2020	44	9	
Lalmuankima	(India)	Forward	2018	—	—	
Lalawmpuia	(India)	Forward	2018–2020	—	—	
Lalthuammawia Ralte	(India)	Goalkeeper	2018–2020	—	—	
Lalhmangai Sanga	(India)	Defender	2018–present	6	0	
Imran Khan	(India)	Midfielder	2018–2020	—	—	
Zaid Krouch	(Morocco)	Midfielder	2019	13	0	
Len	(India)	Forward	2019–2020	22	1	
Aibanbha Dohling	(India)	Defender	2019–present	16	0	
Shubham Dhas	(India)	Goalkeeper	2019–present	—	—	
Kingsley Fernandes	(India)	Midfielder	2019–2020	—	—	
Alexander Romario Jesuraj	(India)	Forward	2019–present	30	2	
Iván González	(Spain)	Defender	2020–present	26	2	
Jorge Ortiz	(Spain)	Midfielder	2020–present	27	8	
Igor Angulo	(Spain)	Forward	2020–2021	21	14	
Alberto Noguera	(Spain)	Midfielder	2020–present	26	2	
James Donachie	(Australia)	Defender	2020–present	23	0	
Sanson Pereira	(India)	Defender	2020–present	15	0	
Leander D'Cunha	(India)	Defender	2020–present	7	1	
Phrangki Buam	(India)	Midfielder	2020–present	1	0	
Makan Chote	(India)	Midfielder	2020–present	8	0	
Redeem Tlang	(India)	Midfielder	2020–present	18	2	
Ishan Pandita	(India)	Forward	2020–2021	17	4	
Devendra Murgaonkar	(India)	Forward	2020–present	24	6	
Antonio Dylan Da Silva	(India)	Goalkeeper	2020–2021	—	—	
Sarineo Fernandes	(India)	Defender	2020–2021	—	—	
Nestor Dias	(India)	Midfielder	2020–2021	—	—	
Flan Gomes	(India)	Midfielder	2020–2021	—	—	
Aaren D'Silva	(India)	Forward	2020–2021	—	—	
Dheeraj Singh Moirangthem	(India)	Goalkeeper	2021–present	16	0	
Adil Khan	(India)	Defender	2021	10	0	
Amarjit Singh Kiyam	(India)	Midfielder	2021–present	6	0	
Glan Martins	(India)	Midfielder	2021–present	18	1	
Hrithik Tiwari	(India)	Goalkeeper	2021–present	1	0	
Kunal Kundaikar	(India)	Defender	2021–present	—	—	
Manushawn Fernandes	(India)	Defender	2021–present	—	—	
Christy Davis	(India)	Midfielder	2021–present	5	0	
Brison Fernandes	(India)	Midfielder	2021–present	1	0	
Danstan Fernandes	(India)	Midfielder	2021–present	3	0	
Nongdamba Naorem	(India)	Midfielder	2021–present	—	—	
Muhammed Nemil	(India)	Midfielder	2021–present	6	4	
Delton Colaco	(India)	Forward	2021–present	2	0	

== List of foreign players ==
The list includes all the players registered under a FC Goa contract. Some players might not have featured in a professional game for the club.

Name	Nat	Position	FC GOA career	Apps	Goals	Ref
Robert Pires	(France)	Midfielder	2014	8	1	
Jan Šeda	(Czech Republic)	Goalkeeper	2014	14	0	
André Santos	(Brazil)	Midfielder	2014	12	4	
Grégory Arnolin	(Martinique)	Defender	2014–2016	39	3	
Youness Bengelloun	(France)	Defender	2014	13	2	
Tolgay Özbey	(Australia)	Forward	2014	9	2	
Bruno Pinheiro	(Portugal)	Midfielder	2014, 2017–2018	26	0	
Miroslav Slepička	(Czech Republic)	Forward	2014	10	5	
Miguel Herlein	(Portugal)	Forward	2014	5	0	
Edgar Marcelino	(Portugal)	Midfielder	2014	3	1	
Ranti Martins	(Nigeria)	Forward	2014	8	0	
Zohib Islam Amiri	(Afghanistan)	Defender	2014	9	0	
Lúcio	(Brazil)	Defender	2015–2017	19	0	
Luciano Sabrosa	(Brazil)	Defender	2015–2016	10	0	
Léo Moura	(Brazil)	Midfielder	2015	16	2	
Reinaldo	(Brazil)	Forward	2015–2016	17	7	
Rafael Coelho	(Brazil)	Forward	2015–2016	16	7	
Jofre	(Spain)	Midfielder	2015–2016	23	6	
Dudu	(Nigeria)	Forward	2015	7	4	
Darryl Duffy	(Scotland)	Forward	2015	4	0	
Victor Simões	(Brazil)	Forward	2015	-	-	
Jonatan Lucca	(Brazil)	Midfielder	2015	16	3	
Andrade	(Brazil)	Goalkeeper	2015	5	0	
Rafael Dumas	(Brazil)	Defender	2016	11	0	
Richarlyson	(Brazil)	Midfielder	2016	12	1	
Matheus Gonçalves	(Brazil)	Midfielder	2016	13	0	
Júlio César	(Brazil)	Forward	2016	11	1	
Coro	(Spain)	Forward	2017–2020	64	55	
Chechi	(Spain)	Defender	2017–2018	13	1	
Ahmed Jahouh	(Morocco)	Midfielder	2017–2020	56	1	
Edu Bedia	(Spain)	Midfielder	2017–present	86	12	
Manu Lanzarote	(Spain)	Midfielder	2017–2018	19	13	
Manuel Arana	(Spain)	Midfielder	2017–2018	10	3	
Adrián Colunga	(Spain)	Forward	2017–2018	2	1	
Hugo Boumous	(France)	Midfielder	2018–2020	47	20	
Mark Sifneos	(Netherlands)	Forward	2018	7	1	
Mourtada Fall	(Senegal)	Defender	2018–2020	43	9	
Carlos Peña	(Spain)	Defender	2018–2020	43	2	
Miguel Palanca	(Spain)	Midfielder	2018–2019	7	3	
Zaid Krouch	(Morocco)	Midfielder	2019	13	0	
Iván González	(Spain)	Defender	2020–2022	36	3	
Jorge Ortiz	(Spain)	Midfielder	2020–2022	41	15	
Igor Angulo	(Spain)	Forward	2020–2022	21	14	
Alberto Noguera	(Spain)	Midfielder	2020–2022	39	4	
James Donachie	(Australia)	Defender	2020–2021	23	0	
Airam Cabrera	(Spain)	Forward	2021–2022	13	6	
Dylan Fox	(Australia)	Defender	2021–2022	10	1	
Fares Arnaout	(Syria)	Defender	2022–present	19	1	
Noah Sadaoui	(Morocco)	Forward	2022–present	20	9	
Hernán Santana	(Spain)	Midfielder	2022–present	4	0	
Iker Guarrotxena	(Spain)	Midfielder	2022–present	20	11	
Álvaro Vázquez	(Spain)	Forward	2022–present	17	1	
Marc Valiente	(Spain)	Defender	2022–present	8	0	

=== Notable Internationals ===
- (France) Robert Pires
- (Brazil) André Santos
- (Martinique) Grégory Arnolin
- (Czech Republic) Miroslav Slepička
- (Afghanistan) Zohib Islam Amiri
- (Brazil) Lúcio
- (Brazil) Léo Moura
- (Brazil) Richarlyson
- (Catalonia) Coro
- (Catalonia) Sergio Juste
- (Morocco) Ahmed Jahouh
- (Morocco) Noah Sadaoui
- (Syria) Fares Arnaout
- (Catalonia) Álvaro Vázquez
- (Catalonia) Marc Valiente
