= List of FC Goa records and statistics =

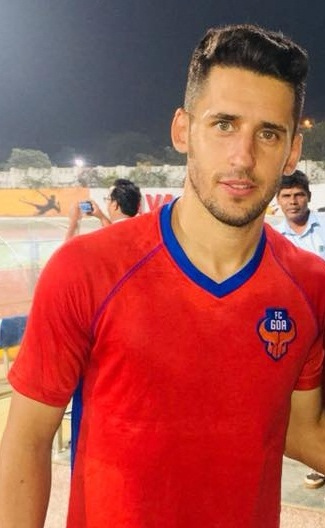
Ferran Corominas, pictured in 2018, is FC Goa's all-time top-scorer with 55 goals.

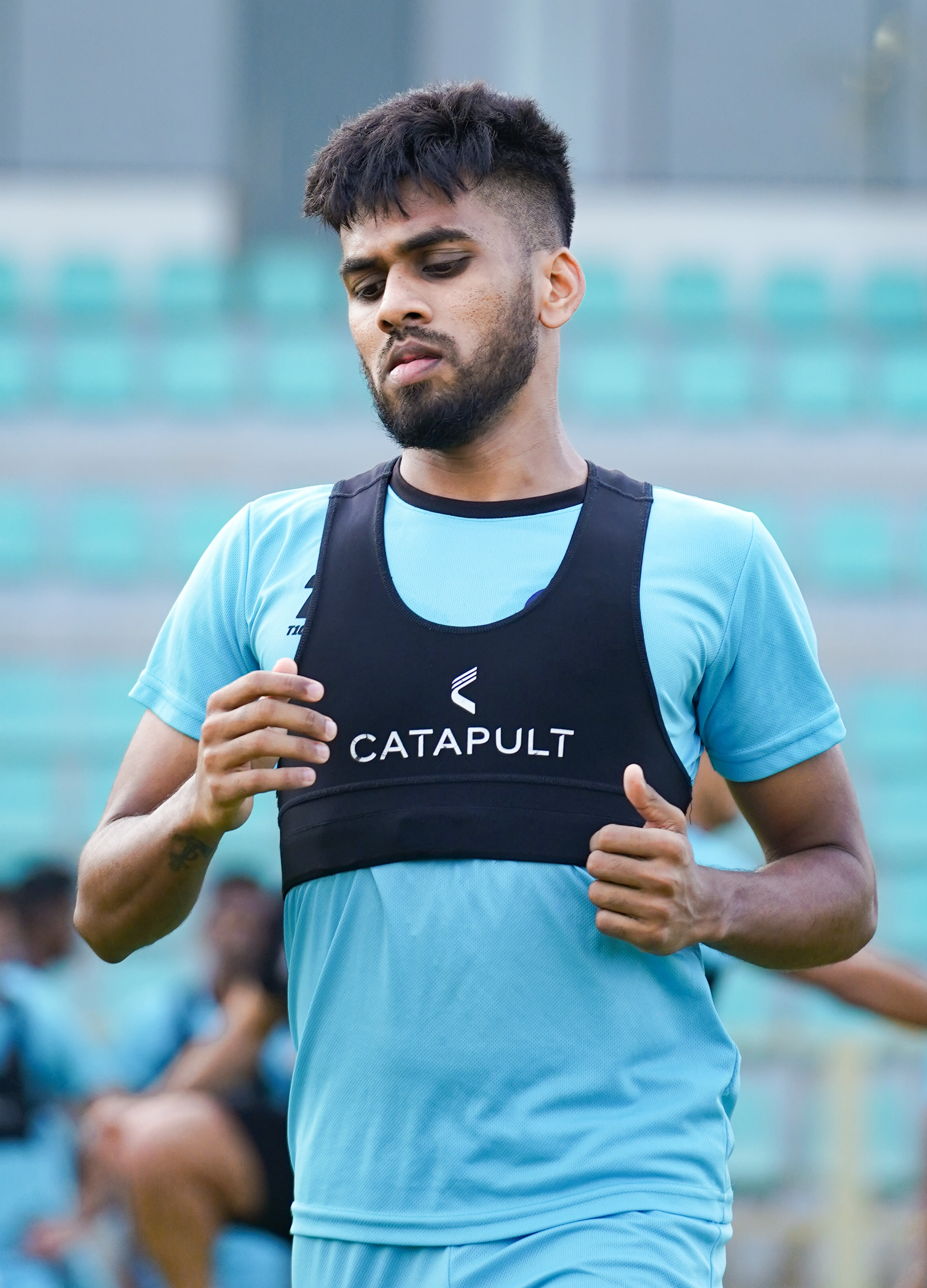
Brandon Fernandes is FC Goa's all-time assister in ISL with 22 assists.

Football Club Goa, also known as Goa, is a professional football club based in Goa, India, that competes in the Indian Super League. The club was officially launched on 26 August 2014.

== Honours ==
=== League ===
Indian Super League

- Premiers: 2019–20
- Runners-up: 2015, 2018–19

=== Cups ===
Super Cup

- Winners: 2019, 2024-25, 2025-26

Durand Cup

- Winners: 2021

=== Regional ===
Goa Professional League

- Winners: 2018–19

Goa Police Cup

- Winners: 2019

GFA Charity Cup

- Winners: 2019

== Club ==
=== All time performance record ===
As of 1 August 2023

| Competition | MP | W | D | L | GF | GA |
|---|---|---|---|---|---|---|
| Indian Super League | 170 | 70 | 45 | 55 | 303 | 240 |
| Super Cup | 7 | 6 | 0 | 1 | 20 | 7 |
| AFC Champions League | 6 | 0 | 3 | 3 | 2 | 9 |
| Durand Cup | 10 | 6 | 2 | 2 | 21 | 10 |
| Total | 193 | 82 | 50 | 61 | 346 | 266 |

=== ISL seasons record ===
As of 3 June 2022

| Year | ISL Regular season | | | | | | | | Finals | Super Cup | Asia | Top Scorer(s) | |
| Year | P | W | D | L | GF | GA | Pts | Pos. | Finals | Super Cup | Asia | Player(s) | Goals |
|---|---|---|---|---|---|---|---|---|---|---|---|---|---|
| 2014 | 14 | 6 | 4 | 4 | 21 | 12 | 22 | 2nd | Semi-finals | Did not exist ▼ | No Qualification from ISL | (Czech Republic) Miroslav Slepička | 5 |
| 2015 | 14 | 7 | 4 | 3 | 29 | 20 | 25 | 1st | Runners-up | Did not exist ▼ | No Qualification from ISL | (Brazil) Reinaldo | 7 |
| 2016 | 14 | 4 | 2 | 8 | 15 | 25 | 14 | 8th | Did not qualify | Did not exist ▼ | No Qualification from ISL | (Brazil) Rafael Coelho | 5 |
| 2017–18 | 18 | 9 | 3 | 6 | 42 | 28 | 30 | 3rd | Semi-Finals | Semi-Finals | DNQ | (Spain) Coro | 18+2 |
| 2018–19 | 18 | 10 | 4 | 4 | 36 | 20 | 34 | 2nd | Runners-up | Winners | DNQ | (Spain) Coro | 16+5 |
| 2019–20 | 18 | 12 | 3 | 3 | 46 | 23 | 39 | 1st League Shield Winner | Semi-finals | Tournament Suspended ▼ | AFC Champions League; Group E | (Spain) Coro | 14 |
| 2020–21 | 20 | 7 | 10 | 3 | 31 | 23 | 31 | 4th | Semi-finals | Tournament Suspended ▼ | DNQ | (Spain) Igor Angulo | 14 |
| 2021–22 | 20 | 4 | 7 | 9 | 29 | 35 | 19 | 9th | Did not qualify | Tournament Suspended ▼ | DNQ | (Spain) Jorge Ortiz | 8+1 |
| 2022–23 | 20 | 8 | 3 | 9 | 36 | 35 | 27 | 7th | Did not qualify | Group Stage | DNQ | (Spain) Iker Guarrotxena | 11+2 |

=== General ===
Note: When scores are mentioned, score of FC Goa are given first.

- First match: 1–2 (vs Chennaiyin FC, 15 October 2014)
- First win: 2–1 (vs Delhi Dynamos, 1 November 2014)
- Biggest win : 7–0 (vs Mumbai City FC, 17 November 2015) (also an ISL record)
- Biggest away win :
  - 5–0 (vs Jamshedpur FC, 19 February 2020) (also an ISL record)
  - 5–0 (vs Jamshedpur FC, 17 September 2021) (Durand Cup)
- Biggest loss:
  - 0–4 (vs Chennaiyin FC, 11 October 2015)
  - 0–4 (vs ATK, 22 November 2015)
  - 1-5 (vs Delhi Dynamos, 27 November 2016)
  - 0–4 (vs Persepolis FC, 23 April 2021)
- Highest scoring draw:
  - 3–3 (vs Mumbai City FC, 8 February 2021)
- Longest winning run: 5 games, during 2019–20 Indian Super League
- Longest unbeaten run: 17 (15+2) games, during 2020–21 Indian Super League (also an ISL record) and 2021 AFC Champions League
- Biggest win in Super Cup: 5–1 (vs Jamshedpur FC, 12 April 2018) (also a Super Cup record)
- Biggest loss in Super Cup: 0–1 (vs SC East Bengal, 16 April 2018)
- Biggest win in Champions League: N/A
- Biggest loss in Champions League: 0–4 (vs Persepolis FC, 23 April 2021)
- Highest home attendance: 19752 (vs Kerala Blasters FC, 26 November 2014)
- Lowest home attendance: 2567 (vs Delhi Dynamos, 21 February 2018)
- Highest average home attendance in a season: 18843, during 2015 Indian Super League
- Lowest average home attendance in a season: 13532, during 2019–20 Indian Super League

Note: The stats given below doesn't include the data from the playoffs.

- Most wins in a ISL season: 12 (out of 18 matches), during 2019–20 Indian Super League
- Fewest wins in a ISL season: 4 (out of 14 matches), during 2016 Indian Super League
- Most defeats in a ISL season: 8 (out of 14 matches), during 2016 Indian Super League
- Fewest defeats in a ISL season: 3
  - (out of 14 matches), during 2015 Indian Super League
  - (out of 18 matches), during 2019–20 Indian Super League
  - (out of 20 matches), during 2020–21 Indian Super League
- Most draws in a ISL season: 10 (out of 20 matches), during 2020–21 Indian Super League
- Fewest draws in a ISL season: 2 (out of 14 matches), during 2016 Indian Super League
- Most goals scored in a ISL season: 46 in 18 games, during 2019–20 Indian Super League (also an ISL record)
- Fewest goals scored in a ISL season: 15 in 14 games, during 2016 Indian Super League
- Most goals conceded in a ISL season: 28 in 18 games, during 2017–18 Indian Super League
- Fewest goals conceded in a ISL season: 12 in 14 games, during 2014 Indian Super League
- Most clean sheets in a season: 8 in 18 games, during 2018–19 Indian Super League
- Fewest clean sheets in a season: 2 in 18 games, during 2017–18 Indian Super League
- Most points in a ISL season: 39 in 18 games, during 2019–20 Indian Super League
- Fewest points in a ISL season: 14 in 14 games, during 2016 Indian Super League
- Best ISL league stage finish: 1st – 2015 & 2019-20
- Worst ISL league stage finish: 8th – 2016
- Best goal difference in a season: +23, during 2019–20 Indian Super League (also an ISL record)
- Worst goal difference in a season: -10, during 2016 Indian Super League

== Players ==
=== Appearances ===
- Record appearance maker: **100** – Mandar Rao Dessai
- Most appearances in Indian Super League: **97** – Mandar Rao Dessai (also an ISL record)
- Most ISL finals appearance: **2** – Mandar Rao Dessai
- Most appearances in Super Cup: **7** –
  - Ferran Corominas
  - Seriton Fernandes
- Most appearances in AFC Champions League: **6** –
  - Brandon Fernandes
  - Glan Martins
  - Ishan Pandita
  - Sanson Pereira
- Youngest player: Mohammad Nawaz – **18 years, 8 months and 10 days** (on 1 October 2018 vs NorthEast United FC)
- Youngest foreign player: Matheus Trindade – **20 years, 6 months and 29 days** (on 4 October 2016 vs NorthEast United FC)
- Oldest player: Robert Pires – **41 years, 1month and 11 days** (on 10 December 2014 vs ATK)
- Oldest Indian player: Lenny Rodrigues – **33 years, 8 months and 7 days** (on 17 January 2021 vs ATK Mohun Bagan FC)

==== Most appearances ====
As of 8 December 2021
(Players with their names in bold currently plays for the club.)

| Rank | Player | Appearances | | | | |
| Rank | Player | League | Cup | AFC | Other^{1} | Total |
|---|---|---|---|---|---|---|
| 1 | (India) Mandar Rao Dessai | 97 | 3 | - | - | 100 |
| 2 | (India) **Seriton Fernandes** | 82 | 7 | 5 | 1 | 95 |
| 3 | (Spain) **Edu Bedia** | 75 | 6 | 4 | 5 | 90 |
| 4 | (India) **Brandon Fernandes** | 62 | 6 | 6 | 4 | 78 |
| 5 | (Spain) Ferran Corominas | 57 | 7 | - | - | 64 |
| 6 | (Morocco) Ahmed Jahouh | 56 | - | - | - | 56 |
| 7 | (India) Lenny Rodrigues | 51 | 4 | - | - | 55 |
| 8 | (India) Manvir Singh | 47 | 5 | - | - | 52 |
| 9 | (India) **Saviour Gama** | 37 | 4 | 5 | 5 | 51 |

^{1} Other appearances include: Durand Cup

=== Club captains ===
- Most appearances as a captain in ISL: **39** – Mandar Rao Dessai

==== List of Club Captains ====
| Period | Name |
|---|---|
| 2014 | (France) Robert Pires |
| 2015–2016 | (Brazil) Lúcio |
| 2017–2018 | (India) Laxmikant Kattimani |
| 2018–2020 | (India) Mandar Rao Dessai |
| 2020–23 | (Spain) Edu Bedia |
| 2023– | (Spain) Odei Onaindia |

=== Goals ===
- All time top scorer: **55** – Ferran Corominas
- All time Indian top scorer: **11** – Brandon Fernandes
- First goalscorer: Grégory Arnolin (vs Chennaiyin FC, 15 October 2014)
- First Indian goalscorer: Jewel Raja (vs Delhi Dynamos, 1 November 2014)
- First Goan(Indian) goalscorer: Romeo Fernandes (vs FC Pune City, 22 November 2014)
- First goal at home ground: Grégory Arnolin (vs Chennaiyin FC, 15 October 2015)
- Most goals in ISL: **48** – Ferran Corominas (also an ISL record)
- Most goals in ISL by an Indian : **9** – Jackichand Singh
- Most goals in an ISL season: **18** – Ferran Corominas, during 2017–18 Indian Super League (also an ISL record)
- Most goals in a ISL season by an Indian: **5** – Jackichand Singh, during 2019–20 Indian Super League
- First goalscorer in Champions League: Edu Bedia (vs Persepolis, 20 April 2021)
- First Indian goalscorer in Champions League: **N/A**
- Most goals in AFC Champions League: **1**
  - Edu Bedia
  - Jorge Ortiz
- First goalscorer in Super Cup: Ferran Corominas (vs ATK, 3 April 2018)
- First Indian goalscorer in Super Cup: Brandon Fernandes (vs ATK, 3 April 2018)
- Most goals in Super Cup: **7** – Ferran Corominas (also a joint Super Cup record with Sunil Chettri)
- Most goals in a Super Cup: **5** – Ferran Corominas during 2019 Indian Super Cup
- Most goals in a match: **3**
  - Dudu Omagbemi (vs Mumbai, 17 November 2015)
  - Thongkhosiem Haokip (vs Mumbai, 17 November 2015)
  - Reinaldo (vs Kerala, 29 November 2015)
  - Coro (vs Bengaluru, 30 November 2017)
  - Coro (vs Kerala, 9 December 2017)
- First Hat trick: Dudu Omagbemi (vs Mumbai, 17 November 2015)
- Fastest hat-trick: **7 minutes** – Coro (vs Kerala Blasters FC, 9 December 2017) (also an ISL record)
- Youngest goalscorer:
  - Muhammed Nemil – **19 years, 5 months and 26 days** (vs Sudeva Delhi FC, 13 September 2021) in Durand Cup
  - Sahil Tavora – **21 years, 1 month and 12 days** (vs Chennaiyin FC, 1 December 2016) in ISL
- Youngest foreign goalscorer: Mark Sifneos – **21 years, 3 months and 4 days** (vs ATK, 28 February 2018)
- Oldest goalscorer: Robert Pires – **41 years and 15 days** (vs Delhi Dynamos, 13 November 2014) (also an ISL record)
- Oldest Indian goalscorer: Lenny Rodrigues – **32 years, 6 months and 21 days** (vs Kerala Blasters FC, 1 December 2019)
- Fastest goal: **56 seconds** – Jackichand Singh (vs ATK, 14 February 2019)

==== Most goals ====
As of 3 October 2021
(Players with their name in bold currently plays for the club.)

| Rank | Player | Goals | | | | |
| Rank | Player | League | Cup | AFC | Other^{1} | Total |
|---|---|---|---|---|---|---|
| 1 | (Spain) Ferran Corominas | 48 | 7 | - | - | 55 |
| 2 | (France) Hugo Boumous | 16 | 4 | - | - | 20 |
| 3 | (Spain) Igor Angulo | 14 | - | - | - | 14 |
| 4 | (Spain) Manuel Lanzarote | 13 | - | - | - | 13 |
| 5 | (Spain) **Edu Bedia** | 9 | 1 | 1 | 1 | 12 |
| 6 | (India) **Brandon Fernandes** | 5 | 5 | 0 | 1 | 11 |
| 7 | (Senegal) Mourtada Fall | 9 | 0 | - | - | 9 |
| 7 | (India) Jackichand Singh | 9 | 0 | - | - | 9 |

^{1} Other goals include: Durand Cup

==== Club Hat-tricks ====
| Player | Total Goals | Opponent | Final score | Venue | Date (Season) | Notes |
|---|---|---|---|---|---|---|
| (Nigeria) Dudu Omagbemi | 3 | Mumbai City FC | **7**–0 | Fatorda Stadium | 17 November 2015 (2015 Indian Super League) | |
| (India) Thongkhosiem Haokip | 3 | Mumbai City FC | **7**–0 | Fatorda Stadium | 17 November 2015 (2015 Indian Super League) | |
| (Brazil) Reinaldo | 3 | Kerala Blasters FC | 1–**5** | Jawaharlal Nehru Stadium (Kochi) | 29 November 2015 (2015 Indian Super League) | |
| (Spain) Ferran Corominas | 3 | Bengaluru FC | **4**–3 | Fatorda Stadium | 30 November 2017 (2017–18 Indian Super League) | |
| (Spain) Ferran Corominas | 3 | Kerala Blasters FC | **5**–2 | Fatorda Stadium | 9 December 2017 (2017–18 Indian Super League) | |
| (Spain) Borja Herrera | 3 | East Bengal FC | **3**–3 | Fatorda Stadium | 27 September 2024 (2024–25 Indian Super League) | |

=== Assists in ISL ===
- Most assists: **18** – Brandon Fernandes
- First assist: Youness Bengelloun (vs Chennaiyin FC, 15 October 2014)
- Most assists by a foreign player: **17** – Hugo Boumous (also an ISL record)
- Most assists in a season: **10** – Hugo Boumous, during 2019–20 Indian Super League (also an ISL record)
- Most assists in a season by an Indian: **7** – Brandon Fernandes, during 2019–20 Indian Super League (also a joint ISL record with Udanta Singh)

==== Most assists in ISL ====
As of 9 March 2021
(Players with their name in bold currently plays for the club.)

| Rank | Player | Assists |
|---|---|---|
| 1 | (India) **Brandon Fernandes** | 18 |
| 2 | (France) Hugo Boumous | 17 |
| 3 | (Spain) Ferran Corominas | 16 |
| 4 | (Spain) **Edu Bedia** | 12 |
| 5 | (India) Mandar Rao Dessai | 11 |

=== Clean sheets in ISL ===
- Most clean sheets: **10** – Mohammad Nawaz
- First clean sheet: Jan Seda (vs Mumbai City FC, 9 November 2014)
- Most clean sheets in a season : **7** – Jan Seda, during 2014 Indian Super League season

==== Most clean sheets ====
As of 3 October 2021
(Players with their name in bold currently plays for the club.)

| Rank | Player | Clean Sheets | | | | |
| Rank | Player | League | Super Cup | AFC | Durand Cup | Total |
|---|---|---|---|---|---|---|
| 1 | (India) Mohammad Nawaz | 10 | 2 | - | - | 12 |
| 2 | (India) **Naveen Kumar** | 7 | 0 | 0 | 2 | 9 |
| 3 | (Czech Republic) Jan Seda | 7 | - | - | - | 7 |
| 4 | (India) Laxmikant Kattimani | 5 | 0 | - | - | 5 |
| 5 | (India) **Dheeraj Singh Moirangthem** | 2 | - | 2 | 0 | 4 |
| 6 | (India) Subhasish Roy Chowdhury | 1 | - | - | - | 1 |
| 6 | (Portugal) Elinton Andrade | 1 | - | - | - | 1 |
| 6 | (India) **Hrithik Tiwari** | - | - | - | 1 | 1 |

=== Season Award Winners ===
Golden Boot – The following players have won the Indian Super League Golden Boot award while playing for FC Goa:

- 2017–18 Indian Super League season: Ferran Corominas
- 2018–19 Indian Super League season: Ferran Corominas
- 2020–21 Indian Super League season: Igor Angulo

Golden Glove – The following player has won the Indian Super League Golden Glove award while playing for FC Goa:

- 2014 Indian Super League season: Jan Seda

Golden Ball – The following players have won the Indian Super League Golden Ball award while playing for FC Goa:

- 2018–19 Indian Super League season: Ferran Corominas
- 2019–20 Indian Super League season: Hugo Boumous

Winning Pass of the League – The following players have won the Winning Pass of the League award while playing for FC Goa:

- 2015 Indian Super League season: Leo Moura
- 2019–20 Indian Super League season: Hugo Boumous
- 2020–21 Indian Super League season: Alberto Noguera

== Head coaches ==
As of 13 August 2023

| Name | Nationality | From | To | P | W | D | L | GF | GA | Win% |
|---|---|---|---|---|---|---|---|---|---|---|
| Zico | Brazil | 2 September 2014 | 18 December 2016 | 47 | 18 | 11 | 18 | 70 | 61 | 38.30 |
| Sergio Lobera | Spain | 6 June 2017 | 31 January 2020 | 60 | 33 | 11 | 16 | 127 | 78 | 55.00 |
| Derrick Pereira (Caretaker) | India | 3 April 2018 | 16 April 2018 | 3 | 2 | 0 | 1 | 8 | 3 | 66.67 |
| Clifford Miranda (Interim) | India | 3 February 2020 | 30 April 2021 | 5 | 4 | 0 | 1 | 19 | 9 | 80.00 |
| Juan Ferrando | Spain | 1 August 2020 | 20 December 2021 | 40 | 15 | 15 | 10 | 61 | 51 | 37.50 |
| Derrick Pereira | India | 21 December 2021 | 16 April 2022 | 14 | 2 | 6 | 6 | 20 | 22 | 14.29 |
| Carlos Peña | Spain | 16 April 2022 | 23 April 2023 | 23 | 10 | 3 | 10 | 41 | 40 | 43.48 |
| Manolo Márquez | Spain | 2 June 2023 | Present | 2 | 1 | 1 | 0 | 8 | 2 | 50.00 |
