= List of FC Goa seasons =

FC Goa is an Indian professional football club based in Goa. The club participates in the Indian Super League, the top tier of Indian football. The club was established on 26 August 2014. They play their home matches at the Fatorda Stadium in Margao.

== Key ==
Key to league competitions:

- Indian Super League – Rebranded India's Top Tier Football League, Established In 2014

Key to colours and symbols:

1st or W	Winners
2nd or RU	Runners-up
3rd or 4th	Third or Fourth
⭐	Top scorer in division
🇮🇳	Top Indian scorer in division

Key to league record:

- Season = The year and article of the season
- Finals = Final position
- P = Games played
- W = Games won
- D = Games drawn
- L = Games lost
- GF = Goals scored
- GA = Goals against
- Pts = Points

Key to cup record:

- En-dash (–) = The FC Goa did not participate or cup not held
- R32 = Round of 32
- R16 = Round of 16
- QF = Quarter-finals
- SF = Semi-finals
- RU = Runners-up
- W = Winners

== Seasons ==
The Goa started to play in the Indian Super League from its inception in 2014. They were one of the eight founding teams of the league. From 2017–18 season onwards, two more teams were added into the league. The Super Cup did not exist for the first three seasons until it was introduced in 2017. In 2020, one more team was added into the league. In August 2021, the Gaurs announced their participation in the Durand Cup, which is the oldest existing football tournament in Asia and 3rd oldest existing professional club football tournament in the world.

As of 15 June 2026

Season	League								Finals	Super Cup	Durand Cup	Asia	Top Scorer	
Season	P	W	D	L	GF	GA	Pts	Position	Finals	Super Cup	Durand Cup	Asia	Player	Goals
2014	14	6	4	4	21	12	22	2nd	Semi-finals	Did not exist ▼	DNP	No Qualification from Isl	(Czech Republic) Miroslav Slepička	5
2015	14	7	4	3	29	20	25	1st	Runners-up	Did not exist ▼	DNP	No Qualification from Isl	(Brazil) Reinaldo	7
2016	14	4	2	8	15	25	14	8th	DNQ	Did not exist ▼	DNP	No Qualification from Isl	(Brazil) Rafael Coelho	5
2017–18	18	9	3	6	42	28	30	4th	Semi-Finals	Semi-finals	DNP	DNQ	(Spain) Coro	20⭐
2018–19	18	10	4	4	36	20	34	2nd	Runners-up	Champions	DNP	DNQ	(Spain) Coro	21⭐
2019–20	18	12	3	3	46	23	39	1st ISL Shield Winners	Semi-finals	Tournament Suspended ▼	DNP	AFC Champions League Group stage	(Spain) Coro	14
2020–21	20	7	10	3	31	23	31	4th	Semi-finals	Tournament Suspended ▼	DNP	DNQ	(Spain) Igor Angulo	14⭐
2021–22	20	4	7	9	29	35	19	9th	DNQ	Tournament Suspended	Champions	DNQ	(Spain) Jorge Ortiz	8
2022–23	20	8	3	9	36	35	27	7th	DNQ	Group Stage	DNP	DNQ	(Spain) Iker Guarrotxena	11
2023–24	22	13	6	3	39	21	45	3rd	Semi-finals	Group Stage	Semi-finals	DNQ	(Spain) Carlos Martinez (Morocco) Noah Sadaoui	10
2024–25	24	14	6	4	43	27	48	2nd	Semi-finals	Champions	DNP	AFC Champions League Two Group stage	(Albania) Armando Sadiku	9
2025–26	13	5	5	3	15	11	20	7th	Playoffs Suspended	Champions	DNP	AFC Challenge League	(Serbia) Dejan Drazić	6

== See also ==
- FC Goa
- FC Goa Reserves and Academy
- List of FC Goa players
- List of FC Goa records and statistics
