= 2020–21 FC Goa season =

2020–21 football season for Football Club Goa

Goa
2020–21 season
- President: Akshay Tandon
- Head Coach: Juan Ferrando
- Stadium: Fatorda Stadium (Note: Due to the COVID-19 pandemic in India, the 2020–21 Indian Super League would be held entirely in Goa, behind closed doors and FC Goa was allotted the Fatorda Stadium as their home ground for the season.)
- Indian Super League: 4th
- Play-offs: Semi-finals
- AFC Champions League: Group stage
- Top goalscorer: League: Igor Angulo (13); All: Igor Angulo (14)
- Average home league attendance: 🔒 Closed Doors
Home colours	Away colours

The 2020–21 season was the club's seventh season since its establishment in 2014, and their seventh season in the Indian Super League. In addition to the league, the club will also compete in the Indian Super Cup, and the AFC Champions League reaching till its group stages.

== Players ==
=== Current squad ===
As of 29 January 2021

Note: Flags indicate national team as defined under FIFA eligibility rules; some limited exceptions apply. Players may hold more than one non-FIFA nationality.

No.	Pos.	Nation	Player
1	GK	IND	Dheeraj Singh
2	DF	IND	Sanson Pereira
4	DF	ESP	Iván González
5	MF	ESP	Alberto Noguera
6	DF	IND	Leander D'Cunha
7	FW	IND	Len Doungel
8	DF	AUS	James Donachie (on loan from Newcastle Jets)
9	MF	ESP	Jorge Ortiz
10	MF	IND	Brandon Fernandes
11	MF	IND	Princeton Rebello
13	GK	IND	Mohammad Nawaz
16	MF	IND	Phrangki Buam

No.	Pos.	Nation	Player
17	FW	ESP	Igor Angulo
19	FW	IND	Makan Chote
20	DF	IND	Seriton Fernandes
21	DF	IND	Saviour Gama
22	MF	IND	Redeem Tlang
23	MF	ESP	Edu Bedia (Captain)
24	MF	IND	Lenny Rodrigues
26	FW	IND	Ishan Pandita
27	DF	IND	Aibanbha Dohling
32	GK	IND	Naveen Kumar
37	DF	IND	Mohammed Ali
50	DF	IND	Adil Khan (on loan from Hyderabad FC)

== Transfers ==
=== Transfers in ===
Date from	Position	Name	Previous club	Ref
22 July 2020	FW	(Spain) Igor Angulo	(Poland) Górnik Zabrze	
2 August 2020	FW	(India) Redeem Tlang	(India) NorthEast United	
2 August 2020	FW	(India) Makan Chote	(India) Minerva Punjab	
7 August 2020	MF	(Spain) Jorge Ortiz	(Spain) Atlético Baleares	
9 August 2020	DF	(Spain) Iván González	(Spain) Cultural Leonesa	
4 September 2020	MF	(Spain) Alberto Noguera	(Spain) Numancia	
25 September 2020	DF	(Australia) James Donachie	(Australia) Newcastle Jets	
15 January 2021	GK	(India) Dheeraj Singh	(India) ATK Mohun Bagan	
22 January 2021	DF	(India) Adil Khan	(India) Hyderabad FC	
2 February 2021	MF	(India) Glan Martins	(India) ATK Mohun Bagan	
2 February 2021	MF	(India) Amarjit Singh Kiyam	(India) Jamshedpur FC	

=== Loan Returns ===
Position	No.	Player	From
RW	14	(India) Alexander Romario Jesuraj	(India) Mohun Bagan A.C.

=== Loan outs ===
Position	No.	Player	To
LW	7	(India) Seiminlen Doungel	(India) Jamshedpur FC

=== Transfers out ===
Date from	Position	Name	To	Ref
1 July 2020	DF	(Spain) Carlos Peña	Retired	
1 August 2020	MF	(Morocco) Ahmed Jahouh	(India) Mumbai City	
1 August 2020	DF	(Senegal) Mourtada Fall	(India) Mumbai City	
1 August 2020	DF	(India) Mandar Rao Dessai	(India) Mumbai City	
1 August 2020	MF	(India) Kingsley Fernandes	(India) Churchill Brothers	
18 August 2020	MF	(India) Jackichand Singh	(India) Jamshedpur	
26 August 2020	FW	(India) Manvir Singh	(India) ATK Mohun Bagan	
5 September 2020	DF	(India) Chinglensana Singh	(India) Hyderabad	
28 July 2020	MF	(France) Hugo Boumous	(India) Mumbai City	
1 February 2021	MF	(India) Lenny Rodrigues	(India) ATK Mohun Bagan	

== Current technical staff ==
As of June 2020

Position	Name
Head coach	(Spain) Juan Ferrando
Assistant & conditioning coach	(Spain) Javi Gonzalez
Assistant coach	(India) Clifford Miranda
Goalkeeping coach	(India) Virender Singh
Technical Director	(India) Derrick Pereira
Director of Football	(India) Ravi Puskur

== Pre-season and friendlies ==
1 November 2020 Friendly	Goa	3–2	Jamshedpur	Goa
16:00 IST (UTC+05:30)	Angulo; Doungel; Pandita		Grande; Mobashir	Stadium: Tilak Maidan Stadium

8 November 2020 Friendly	Chennaiyin	0–3	Goa	Goa, India
16:00 IST		Report	Igor Angulo Princeton Rebello Sanson Pereira

11 November 2020 Friendly	Hyderabad	4–2	Goa	Panaji
16:00	Lalawmpuia; Halder 2'; Danu	Report	Chote; Fernandes	Stadium: Don Bosco Ground

== Competitions ==
=== Overview ===
Competition	First match	Last match	Starting round	Record							
Competition	First match	Last match	Starting round	Pld	W	D	L	GF	GA	GD	Win %
ISL	22 November 2020	8 March 2021	Matchday 1	22	7	12	3	33	25	+8	31.82
AFC Champions League	14 April 2021	29 April 2021	Group Stage 1st round	6	0	3	3	2	9	−7	0.00
Total				28	7	15	6	35	34	+1	25.00

Last updated: 15 April 2021
Source: FBref

=== Indian Super League ===
==== League table ====
Pos	Team	Pld	W	D	L	GF	GA	GD	Pts	Qualification
2	ATK Mohun Bagan (Note: As the Premiers Mumbai City won the ISL playoffs, the regular season runners-up qualified for 2022 AFC Cup play-off round.)	20	12	4	4	28	15	+13	40	Qualification to ISL playoffs and 2022 AFC Cup play-off round
3	NorthEast United	20	8	9	3	31	25	+6	33	Qualification to ISL playoffs
4	Goa	20	7	10	3	31	23	+8	31	Qualification to ISL playoffs
5	Hyderabad	20	6	11	3	27	19	+8	29	
6	Jamshedpur	20	7	6	7	21	22	−1	27	

Source: Indian Super League
Rules for classification: 1) points; 2) head-to-head points; 3) head-to-head goal difference; 4) head-to-head goals scored; 5) goal difference; 6) number of goals scored; 7) fair play ranking; 8) drawing of lots

==== Results by matchday ====
Matchday	1	2	3	4	5	6	7	8	9	10	11	12	13	14	15	16	17	18	19	20	21	22
Ground	H	H	H	H	A	A	H	A	A	A	B	H	H	A	H	B	A	A	A	H	A	H
Result	D	L	D	W	W	L	L	W	W	D	W	D	D	D	D	D	D	W	W	D	D	D
Position	4	8	7	6	4	6	8	5	3	3	3	3	3	3	3	3	3	3	3	3	3	4

Updated to match(es) played on 28 February 2021. Source: Indian Super League
A = Away; H = Home; W = Win; D = Draw; L = Loss

==== Matches ====
22 November 2020 1	Goa	2–2	Bengaluru	Margao
19:30 IST	Angulo 66', 69'	Report	Silva 27'; Juanan 57'	Stadium: Fatorda Stadium; Attendance: 0 Referee: C. R. Srikrishna; Man of the Match: Igor Angulo (FC Goa)

25 November 2020 2	Goa	0–1	Mumbai City	Margao
19:00 IST (UTC+05:30)	Seriton (yellow card) 30'; Tlang (red card) 40'; Romario (yellow card) 73'; Edu Bedia (yellow card) 90'	Report	Sarthak (yellow card) 24'; Mandar (yellow card) 34'; Ranawade (yellow card) 65'; Le Fondre 90+5' (pen.)	Stadium: Fatorda Stadium; Attendance: 0 Referee: Rahul Kumar Gupta; Man of the Match: Le Fondre (Mumbai City)

30 November 2020 3	Goa	1–1	NorthEast United	Margao
19:30 IST	Angulo 43'	Report	Sylla 40' (pen.)	Stadium: Fatorda Stadium; Attendance: 0 Referee: Crystal John; Man of the Match: Camara (NorthEast United)

6 December 2020 4	Goa	3–1	Kerala Blasters	Margao
21:00 IST	Angulo 30', 90+4'; Ortiz 52'	Report	Kumar (yellow card) 34'; Nhamoinesu (yellow card) 40' (yellow-red card) 90+2'; Praveen (yellow card) 66'; Gómez 90'	Stadium: Fatorda Stadium; Attendance: 0 Referee: Harish Kundu; Man of the Match: Angulo (Goa)

12 December 2020 5	Odisha	0–1	Goa	Bambolim
19:30 IST	Tratt (yellow card) 30'; Antonay (yellow card) 70'	Report	Rodrigues (yellow card) 7'; Angulo 45'; Fernandes (yellow card) 80'	Stadium: GMC Athletic Stadium; Attendance: 0 Referee: Pratik Mondal; Man of the Match: Jorge Ortiz (Goa)

16 December 2020 6	ATK Mohun Bagan	1–0	Goa	Margao
19:30 IST		Report	Krishna 85' (pen.)	Stadium: Fatorda Stadium; Attendance: 0 Referee: Rahul Kumar Gupta; Man of the Match: McHugh (ATK Mohun Bagan)

19 December 2020 7	Goa	1–2	Chennaiyin	Margao
19:30 IST	Mendoza 9'; Rodrigues (yellow card) 56'		Crivellaro 5'; Tangri (yellow card) 9'; R. Singh (yellow card) 14'; Ali 53'; Sipovic (yellow card) 63'	Stadium: Fatorda Stadium; Attendance: 0 Referee: Harish Kundu; Man of the Match: Rafael Crivellaro(Chennaiyin)

23 December 2020 8	Jamshedpur	1–2	Goa	Vasco
19:30 IST	Eze 33'; Mandi (yellow card) 78'; Hartley (yellow card) 83'	Report	González (yellow card) 49'; Angulo 64' (pen.), 90'	Stadium: Tilak Maidan Stadium; Attendance: 0 Referee: A Rowan; Man of the Match: Jorge Ortiz (Goa)

30 December 2020 9	Hyderabad	1–2	Goa	Vasco
19:30 IST	Santana 58'; Souvik (yellow card) 59'; Akash (yellow card) 63'; Lluís Sastre (yellow card) 68'	Report	Ishan 87'; Angulo 90+1'	Stadium: Tilak Maidan Stadium; Attendance: 0 Referee: C. R. Srikrishna; Man of the Match: Angulo (Goa)

6 January 2021 10	East Bengal	1–1	Goa	Vasco
19:30 IST	Raju Gaikwad (yellow card) 31'; Ankit (yellow card) 54'; Fox (red card) 56'; Aaron (yellow card) 67'; Maghoma (yellow card) 73'; Bright 79'; *Neville (yellow card) 90+6'	Report	Fernandes (yellow card) 45'; Devendra 81'; Noguera (yellow card) 82'	Stadium: Tilak Maidan Stadium; Referee: A Rowan; Man of the Match: Bright (East Bengal)

14 January 2021 11	Goa	3–0	Jamshedpur	Margao
19:30 IST	Ortiz 19', 52'; González 89'	Report	Alex (yellow card) 66' (yellow-red card) 86'	Stadium: Fatorda Stadium; Attendance: 0 Referee: Rahul Kumar Gupta; Man of the Match: Naveen Kumar (Goa)

17 January 2021 12	Goa	1–1	ATK Mohun Bagan	Margao
19:30 IST	González (yellow card) 63'; Donachie (yellow card) 74'; Pandita 84'	Report	McHugh (yellow card) 63'; Edu García 75'	Stadium: Fatorda Stadium; Attendance: 0 Referee: L Ajit Metei; Man of the Match: Saviour Gama (Goa)

23 January 2021 13	Kerala Blasters	1–1	Goa	Bambolim
19:30 IST	Rahul (yellow card) 35' (goal) 57'; Jeakson (yellow card) 63'	Report	Ortiz 25'; González (yellow card) 65' (yellow-red card) 65'; Naveen (yellow card) 87'	Stadium: GMC Athletic Stadium; Attendance: 0 Referee: Ranjit Baksi; Man of the Match: Sandeep (Kerala Blasters)

29 January 2021 14	Goa	1–1	East Bengal	Margao
19:30 IST	Igor Angulo 39'; Edu Bedia (red card) 66'; Saviour Gama (yellow card) 60'	Report	Danny Fox 65' (yellow card) 90'; Scott Neville (yellow card) 74'	Stadium: Fatorda Stadium; Attendance: 0 Referee: Harish Kundu; Man of the Match: Bright Enobakhare (East Bengal)

4 February 2021 15	NorthEast United	2–2	Goa	Margao
19:30 IST	Gallego 41' (pen.), 58' (pen.); Mehta (yellow card) 66'; Camara (yellow card) 84'; Sylla (yellow card) 90+4'	Report	Jesuraj 21'; Kumar 80' (o.g.)	Stadium: Fatorda Stadium; Attendance: 0 Referee: Rowan Arumughan

8 February 2021 16	Mumbai City	3–3	Goa	Bambolim
19:30 IST	Boumous 20' (yellow card) 90' (red card) 90'; Le Fondre 26' (yellow card) 79'; Fall (yellow card) 59'	Report	Martins (yellow card) 8' (goal) 45'; Khan (yellow card) 36'; Angulo 51'; S. Fernandes (yellow card) 57'; Pandita 90'	Stadium: GMC Athletic Stadium; Attendance: 0 Referee: Pranjal Banerjee

17 February 2021 17	Goa	3–1	Odisha	Margao
19:30 IST	Noguera 18'; Ortiz 26'; González 75'	Report	Maurício 30'	Stadium: Fatorda Stadium

13 February 2021 18	Chennaiyin	2–2	Goa	Bambolim
19:30 IST	Jakub Sylvestr 13'; Chhangte 60'; Singh (yellow card) 70'; Manuel Lanzarote (yellow card) 79'; Edwin (yellow card) 90'	Report	Igor Angulo 19' (pen.); Jorge Ortiz (yellow card) 90'; Ishan Pandita 90'; Edu Bedia (yellow card) 90'	Stadium: GMC Stadium; Attendance: 0 Referee: Crystal John; Man of the Match: Ishan Pandita(Goa)

21 February 2021 19	Bengaluru	1–2	Goa	Margao
17:00 IST	Kuruniyan (yellow card) 19'; Suresh 33'; Dimas (yellow card) 79'	Report	Angulo 20'; Redeem 23'; Romario (yellow card) 60'	Stadium: Fatorda Stadium; Attendance: 0 Referee: Crystal John; Man of the Match: Glan Martins (Goa)

28 February 2021 20	Goa	0–0	Hyderabad	Margao
17:00 IST	Donachie (yellow card) 33'; Bedia (yellow card) 55'; Tlang (yellow card) 57'; Noguera (yellow card) 83' (yellow-red card) 87'; González (yellow card) 90+8'	Report	Chakrabarti (yellow card) 42'; João Victor (yellow card) 64'; Sastre (red card) 86'	Stadium: Fatorda Stadium; Attendance: 0 Referee: Banerjee Pranjal

==== Playoffs ====
5 March 2021 Semi-finals 1st leg	Goa	2–2	Mumbai City	Margao
19:30 IST	Angulo 20' (pen.); Saviour 59'	Report	Boumous 38'; Fall 61'	Stadium: Fatorda Stadium; Attendance: 0 Referee: Pranjal Banerjee (India)

8 March 2021 Semi-finals 2nd leg	Mumbai City	0–0 (a.e.t.) (2–2 agg.) (6–5 p)	Goa	Bambolim
19:30 IST		Report		Stadium: GMC Stadium; Attendance: 0 Referee: Ajit Kumar Meitei (India)
	Penalties
	Ogbeche (penalty scored); Hernán (penalty missed); Boumous (penalty missed); Raynier (penalty scored); Jahouh (penalty missed); Ranawade (penalty scored); Fall (penalty scored); Mandar (penalty scored); Borges (penalty scored)		Bedia (penalty missed); Brandon (penalty missed); Angulo (penalty scored); Iván (penalty scored); Donachie (penalty missed); Pandita (penalty scored); Ortiz (penalty scored); Adil (penalty scored); Glan (penalty missed)

=== AFC Champions League ===
==== Group stage ====
Pos	Team	Pld	W	D	L	GF	GA	GD	Pts	Qualification	PER	WAH	GOA	RAY
1	(Iran) Persepolis	6	5	0	1	14	5	+9	15	Advance to Round of 16	—	1–0	2–1	4–2
2	(United Arab Emirates) Al-Wahda	6	4	1	1	7	3	+4	13	Advance to Round of 16	1–0	—	0–0	3–2
3	(India) Goa (H)	6	0	3	3	2	9	−7	3		0–4	0–2	—	0–0
4	(Qatar) Al-Rayyan	6	0	2	4	6	12	−6	2		1–3	0–1	1–1	—

Source: AFC
Rules for classification: Tiebreakers
(H) Hosts

==== Matches ====
14 April 2021 1	Goa (India)	0–0	(Qatar) Al-Rayyan	Goa, India
22:30 IST	A. Jesuraj (yellow card) 45+1'; Pereira (yellow card) 64'	Report	M. Alaaeldin (yellow card) 13'; I. Maqsoud (yellow card) 38'; A. Maqsoud (yellow card) 87'	Stadium: Fatorda Stadium; Attendance: 0 (Note: Match was played behind closed doors due to government restrictions regarding the COVID-19 pandemic.); Referee: Nazmi Nasaruddin (Malaysia); Man of the Match: Yacine Brahimi (Al-Rayyan)

17 April 2021 2	Al-Wahda (United Arab Emirates)	0–0	(India) Goa	Goa, India
20:00 IST	A. Karbi (yellow card) 60'; M. Harbi (yellow card) 89'	Report	I. González (yellow card) 56'; A. Jesuraj (yellow card) 61'; Bedia (yellow card) 74'	Stadium: Fatorda Stadium; Attendance: 0 Referee: Ahmad Al-Ali (Kuwait); Man of the Match: Edu Bedia (Goa)

20 April 2021 3	Persepolis (Iran)	2–1	(India) Goa	Goa, India
22:30 IST	Torabi 18' (pen.); Hosseini 24'	Report	Seriton (yellow card) 10'; Bedia 14', (yellow card) 64'	Stadium: Fatorda Stadium; Attendance: 0 Referee: Hanna Hattab (Syria); Man of the Match: Dheeraj Singh (Goa)

23 April 2021 4	Goa (India)	0–4	(Iran) Persepolis	Goa, India
22:30 IST	D'Cunha (yellow card) 15'; Pereira (yellow card) 72'	Report	Moghanlou 24'; Torabi 43' (pen.); Alekasir 47'; Kamyabinia 58'	Stadium: Fatorda Stadium; Attendance: 0 Referee: Hiroyuki Kimura (Japan)

26 April 2021 5	Al-Rayyan (Qatar)	1–1	(India) Goa	Goa, India
22:30 IST	Ferydoon 89'; Al-Korbi (yellow card) 24'; Y. Umar (yellow card) 90+2'	Report	Ortiz 3'; I. González (yellow card) 40'; B. Fernandes (yellow card) 61'; Dheeraj Singh (yellow card) 83'	Stadium: Fatorda Stadium; Attendance: 0 Referee: Hanna Hattab (Syria); Man of the Match: Jorge Ortiz Mendoza (Goa)

29 April 2021 6	Goa (India)	0–2	(United Arab Emirates) Al-Wahda	Goa, India
22:30 IST		Report	Kharbin 61'; Barquesh 90'; Hamad (yellow card) 37'	Stadium: Fatorda Stadium; Attendance: 0

== Statistics ==
=== Squad appearances and goals ===
No.	Pos	Nat	Player	Total		Super League		ACL	
No.	Pos	Nat	Player	Apps	Goals	Apps	Goals	Apps	Goals
Goalkeepers
1	GK	(India) IND	Dheeraj Singh	5	0	1	0	4	0
13	GK	(India) IND	Mohammad Nawaz	10	0	10	0	0	0
31	GK	(India) IND	Shubham Dhas	0	0	0	0	0	0
32	GK	(India) IND	Naveen Kumar	3	0	3	0	0	0
41	GK	(India) IND	Dylan Ignacio da Silva	0	0	0	0	0	0
Defenders
2	DF	(India) IND	Sanson Pereira	3	0	3	0	0	0
4	DF	(Spain) ESP	Iván González	12	1	12	1	0	0
6	DF	(India) IND	Leander D'Cunha	0	0	0	0	0	0
8	DF	(Australia) AUS	James Donachie	12	0	12	0	0	0
20	DF	(India) IND	Seriton Fernandes	13	0	13	0	0	0
21	DF	(India) IND	Saviour Gama	13	0	13	0	0	0
27	DF	(India) IND	Aibanbha Dohling	8	0	8	0	0	0
37	DF	(India) IND	Mohammed Ali	2	0	2	0	0	0
42	DF	(India) IND	Sarineo Fernandes	0	0	0	0	0	0
Midfielders
5	MF	(Spain) ESP	Alberto Noguera	13	0	13	0	0	0
7	MF	(India) IND	Seiminlen Doungel	7	0	7	0	0	0
10	MF	(India) IND	Brandon Fernandes	11	0	11	0	0	0
11	MF	(India) IND	Princeton Rebello	13	0	13	0	0	0
14	MF	(India) IND	Alexander Romario Jesuraj	13	0	13	0	0	0
16	MF	(India) IND	Phrangki Buam	0	0	0	0	0	0
22	MF	(India) IND	Redeem Tlang	5	0	5	0	0	0
23	MF	(Spain) ESP	Edu Bedia	19	1	14	0	5	1
24	MF	(India) IND	Lenny Rodrigues	10	0	10	0	0	0
43	MF	(India) IND	Aaren D'Silva	0	0	0	0	0	0
44	MF	(India) IND	Nestor Dias	0	0	0	0	0	0
50	MF	(India) IND	Adil Khan	1	0	1	0	0	0
Forwards
9	FW	(Spain) ESP	Jorge Ortiz	19	6	14	5	5	1
17	FW	(Spain) ESP	Igor Angulo	13	10	13	10	0	0
19	MF	(India) IND	Makan Chote	1	0	1	0	0	0
26	FW	(India) IND	Ishan Pandita	5	2	5	2	0	0
29	FW	(India) IND	Devendra Murgaonkar	6	1	6	1	0	0
88	FW	(India) IND	Flan Gomes	0	0	0	0	0	0

Last updated: 31 January 2021.
Source: FBref

=== Goal scorers ===
Rank	No.	Pos.	Player	Indian Super League	Play-offs	AFC Champions League	Total
1	17	FW	(Spain) Igor Angulo	13	1	0	14
2	9	MF	(Spain) Jorge Ortiz	6	0	0	6
3	26	FW	(India) Ishan Pandita	4	0	0	4
4	4	DF	(Spain) Iván González	2	0	0	2
5	5	MF	(Spain) Alberto Noguera	1	0	0	1
5	14	MF	(India) Alexander Romario Jesuraj	1	0	0	1
5	21	DF	(India) Saviour Gama	0	1	0	1
5	22	MF	(India) Redeem Tlang	1	0	0	1
5	25	FW	(India) Glan Martins	1	0	0	1
5	29	FW	(India) Devendra Murgaonkar	1	0	0	1
Own goals				1	0	0	1
Total				31	2	0	33

Last updated: 8 March 2021.
Source: FBref

=== Clean sheets ===
Rank	No.	Pos.	Player	Indian Super League	Play-offs	AFC Champions League	Total
1	1	GK	(India) Dheeraj Singh	1	1	2	4
2	13	GK	(India) Mohammad Nawaz	1	0	0	1
2	32	GK	(India) Naveen Kumar	1	0	0	1
Total				3	1	0	5

Last updated: 8 March 2021.
Source: FBref
