= Makan Chothe =

Indian footballer

Personal information
- Full name: Makan Winkle Chothe
- Date of birth: 19 January 2000 (age 26)
- Place of birth: Chandel, Manipur, India
- Height: 1.69 m (5 ft 6 1/2 in)
- Position: Winger

Team information
- Current team: Gokulam Kerala

Senior career*
Years	Team	Apps	(Gls)
2018–2020	Minerva Punjab	26	(2)
2019–2020	→ Minerva Punjab B	2	(0)
2020–2023	Goa	26	(1)
2023–2024	Hyderabad	16	(1)
2024–2026	Mohammedan	30	(1)
2026–	Gokulam Kerala	1	(1)
- * Club domestic league appearances and goals as of 17:32, 12 April 2024 (UTC)

Makan Winkle Chothe (born 19 January 2000) is an Indian professional footballer who plays as a winger for Indian Football League club Gokulam Kerala.

== Career statistics ==
=== Club ===
As of 12 April 2024

Club	Season	League			National Cup		League Cup		AFC		Total	
Club	Season	Division	Apps	Goals	Apps	Goals	Apps	Goals	Apps	Goals	Apps	Goals
Minerva Punjab	2017–18	I-League	1	0	0	0	0	0	—		1	0
Minerva Punjab	2018–19	I-League	11	0	0	0	0	0	6 (Note: Appearance(s) in AFC Champions League) (Note: Appearance(s) in AFC Cup)	0	17	0
Minerva Punjab	2019–20	I-League	14	2	0	0	0	0	—		14	2
Minerva Punjab	Minerva Punjab total		26	2	0	0	0	0	6	0	32	2
Minerva Punjab B	2019–20	I-League 2nd Division	2	0	0	0	0	0	—		2	0
Goa	2020–21	Indian Super League	1	0	0	0	0	0	3	0	4	0
Goa	2021–22	Indian Super League	15	1	4 (Note: Appearance(s) in Durand Cup)	0	0	0	—		19	1
Goa	2022–23	Indian Super League	10	0	0	0	3 (Note: Appearance(s) in Super Cup)	0	—		13	0
Goa	Goa total		26	1	4	0	3	0	3	0	36	1
Hyderabad	2023–24	Indian Super League	16	1	0	0	3	1	—		19	2
Mohammedan	2024–25	Indian Super League	0	0	0	0	0	0	—		0	0
Career total			70	4	4	0	6	1	9	0	89	5

== Honours ==
Goa

- Durand Cup: 2021
