= Sanson Pereira =

Indian footballer

Personal information
- Full name: Sanson Pereira
- Date of birth: 2 October 1997 (age 29)
- Place of birth: Nuvem, Goa, India
- Height: 1.72 m (5 ft 8 in)
- Position: Left-back

Team information
- Current team: Goa
- Number: 2

Youth career
- Salgaocar

Senior career*
Years	Team	Apps	(Gls)
2016–2020	Salgaocar	0	(0)
2020–	Goa	28	(0)
2024	→ Inter Kashi (loan)	7	(0)
- * Club domestic league appearances and goals as of 12:11, 8 April 2024 (UTC)

Sanson Pereira (born 2 October 1997) is an Indian professional footballer who plays as a left-back for Indian Super League club Goa.

== Club career ==
Born in Nuvem, Goa, Pereira began his career with the Salgaocar youth teams after impressing in a trial for the club's under-14 side. In 2016, Pereira was promoted to the club's senior squad and was part of the team that won the Goa Professional League, the top tier state league in Goa, in 2016–17.

On 20 June 2020, it was announced that Pereira has signed with Goa of the Indian Super League. He made his professional debut for the club on 22 November 2020 in the club's opening match against Bengaluru. He started as FC Goa drew the match 2–2.

== Career statistics ==
=== Club ===
As of 8 April 2024

Club	Season	League			Cup		AFC		Total	
Club	Season	Division	Apps	Goals	Apps	Goals	Apps	Goals	Apps	Goals
Goa	2020–21	Indian Super League	4	0	0	0	6 (Note: Appearance(s) in AFC Champions League)	0	10	0
Goa	2021–22	Indian Super League	12	0	5 (Note: Appearance(s) in Durand Cup)	0	–		17	0
Goa	2022–23	Indian Super League	12	0	0	0	–		12	0
Goa	2023–24	Indian Super League	0	0	2	0	–		2	0
Goa	Total		28	0	7	0	6	0	41	0
Inter Kashi (loan)	2023–24	I-League	7	0	0	0	–		7	0
Career total			35	0	7	0	6	0	48	0

== Honours ==
Salgaocar

- Goa Professional League: 2016–17

Goa

- Durand Cup: 2021
