= Seriton Fernandes =

Indian professional footballer (born 1992)

Personal information
- Full name: Seriton Benny Fernandes
- Date of birth: 26 October 1992 (age 34)
- Place of birth: Goa, India
- Height: 1.74 m (5 ft 8 1/2 in)
- Position: Right-back

Youth career
- Dempo
- 2014: Laxmi Prasad
- 2015: Churchill Brothers

Senior career*
Years	Team	Apps	(Gls)
2015–2017	Churchill Brothers	13	(0)
2015–2016	→ Sporting Goa (loan)	8	(0)
2017–2025	Goa	140	(0)

International career^{‡}
2021–2022	India	4	(0)
Medal record
Representing India
SAFF Championship
Winner	2021 Maldives
- * Club domestic league appearances and goals as of 10:00, 8 March 2025 ‡ National team caps and goals as of 17:24, 21 October 2021 (UTC)

Seriton Benny Fernandes (born 26 October 1992), is an Indian professional footballer who plays as a defender.

== Career ==
Born in Goa, Fernandes started his career with the Dempo youth set-up. After leaving Dempo, Fernandes played with both Laxmi Prasad and Churchill Brothers in the Goa Professional League.

Before the 2015–16 I-League season, Fernandes was loaned to Sporting Goa. He made his professional debut for the club on 6 February 2016 against Bengaluru. He started the match and played 70 minutes as Sporting Goa won the match 2–1.

On 8 July 2016, it was announced that Fernandes had signed on permanently with Sporting Goa. Seriton then was selected by Derick Periera to play for Goa for the 2017-18 Indian Super League season. He has also appeared with Goa in the 2021 AFC Champions League.

== Career statistics ==
=== Club ===
As of 25 February 2023

Club	Season	League			Cup		AFC		Total	
Club	Season	Division	Apps	Goals	Apps	Goals	Apps	Goals	Apps	Goals
Sporting Goa (loan)	2015–16	I-League	8	0	0	0	—		8	0
Churchill Brothers	2016–17	I-League	13	0	3 (Note: Appearances in the Super Cup)	0	—		16	0
Goa	2017–18	Indian Super League	19	0	3	0	—		22	0
Goa	2018–19	Indian Super League	21	0	4	1	—		25	1
Goa	2019–20	Indian Super League	19	0	0	0	—		19	0
Goa	2020–21	Indian Super League	19	0	0	0	5 (Note: Appearances in AFC Champions League)	0	24	0
Goa	2021-22	Indian Super League	17	2	1 (Note: Appearances in Durand Cup)	0	—		18	0
Goa	2022-23	Indian Super League	15	0	0	0	—		15	0
Goa	Goa Total		110	0	8	1	5	5	123	1
Career total			131	0	11	1	5	0	147	1

=== International ===
As of 26 March 2022

National team	Year	Apps	Goals
India	2021	3	0
India	2022	1	0
Total		4	0

== Honours ==
=== Club ===
FC Goa

- Indian Super Cup: 2019
- Indian Super League Premiers: 2019–20
- Durand Cup: 2021

=== International ===
India

- SAFF Championship: 2021
