= Saviour Gama =

Indian footballer (born 1997)

Personal information
- Date of birth: 10 May 1997 (age 29)
- Place of birth: Margao, Goa, India
- Height: 1.65 m (5 ft 5 in)
- Position: Left-back

Team information
- Current team: Odisha
- Number: 28

Youth career
- 2018: FC Bardez Goa

Senior career*
Years	Team	Apps	(Gls)
2018–2019	Goa B	7	(0)
2019–2024	Goa	63	(2)
2024–	Odisha	19	(0)
- * Club domestic league appearances and goals as of 23:30, 5 March 2025 (UTC)

Saviour Gama (born 10 May 1997), is an Indian professional footballer who plays as a defender for Indian Super League club Odisha.

== Club career ==
Born in Goa, Gama represented FC Goa B. He was a part of the Goa developmental squad in 2017–18 and played for them in the local Goan matches, including the AWES tournament. Saviour earned a name in football after his impressive performance for the Santa Cruz Club of Cavelossim in the Taca Goa U-20.

Gama made his senior debut for Indian Super League side FC Goa against Chennaiyin FC on 28 February 2019. On 8 July 2019, Gama extended his stay with FC Goa until 2021.

He scored his first goal for Goa in Indian Super League Semi-final against Chennaiyin on 29 February 2020.

On 1 June 2021, Gama signed a new three-year contract with FC Goa, keeping him at the club until 2024.

On 25 August 2024, Gama left Goa and joined fellow ISL club Odisha FC on a contract until the end of the 2024–25 season.

== Career statistics ==
=== Club ===
As of 25 February 2024

Club	Season	League			Cup		AFC		Other		Total	
Club	Season	Division	Apps	Goals	Apps	Goals	Apps	Goals	Apps	Goals	Apps	Goals
Goa	2018–19	Indian Super League	2	0	4 (Note: Appearances in the Super Cup)	0	–		–		6	0
Goa	2019–20	Indian Super League	11	1	2 (Note: Appearances in the Durand Cup)	0	–		–		13	1
Goa	2020–21	Indian Super League	21	1	0	0	5 (Note: Appearances in the AFC Champions League)	0	–		26	1
Goa	2021–22	Indian Super League	17	0	–		–		5	0	22	0
Goa	2022–23	Indian Super League	8	0	3	0	–		–		11	0
Goa	2023–24	Indian Super League	4	0	1	0	–		4	0	9	0
Goa	Total		63	2	10	0	5	0	9	0	87	2
Odisha	2024–25	Indian Super League	18	0	0	0	–		0	0	18	0
Career total			81	2	10	0	5	0	9	0	105	2

== Honours ==
Goa

- Durand Cup: 2021
