= Alexander Romario Jesuraj =

Indian footballer

Alexander Jesuraj
Personal information
- Full name: Alexander Romario Jesuraj
- Date of birth: 26 July 1996 (age 30)
- Place of birth: Dindigul, Tamil Nadu
- Height: 1.70 m (5 ft 7 in)
- Position: Winger

Team information
- Current team: Gokulam Kerala

Youth career
- Tamil Nadu U16

Senior career*
Years	Team	Apps	(Gls)
2017–2019	Chennai City	34	(3)
2019–2022	Goa	30	(3)
2019–2020	→ Mohun Bagan (loan)	7	(1)
2022–2024	Chennaiyin	10	(0)
2024–	Gokulam Kerala	0	(0)
2025	→ Churchill Brothers (loan)	5	(0)
- * Club domestic league appearances and goals as of 15:34, 19 March 2025 (UTC)

Alexander Romario Jesuraj (born 26 July 1996) is an Indian professional footballer who plays as a winger for I-League club Gokulam Kerala.

== Club career ==
=== Youth and early career ===
Born in Dindigul, Tamil Nadu, Alexander began his career with Arrows FC in the Chennai Premier Division aged 17. He pursued B.A. degree in political science from Madras Christian College.

=== Chennai City ===
Alexander started his I-League career with Chennai City in 2017. He was widely regarded as an exciting player. He was nicknamed as "Namma Neymar Romario" (Our Neymar Romario). He won I-league title with Chennai City FC in 2018–19 season.

=== FC Goa ===
On 23 July 2019, Jesuraj joined Goa on a three-year deal from Chennai City.

==== Mohun Bagan (loan) ====
Jesuraj was loaned from Goa to Mohun Bagan. He won his second I-League title with Mohun Bagan in 2019–20 season.

=== Back to FC Goa ===
On 22 November 2020, Alexander made his first appearance for Goa in Indian Super League against Bengaluru. Alexander scored his first goal for club on 4 February 2021 against NorthEast United FC, the match ended in 2–2 draw. He made his first continental appearance on 14 April 2021, against Qatari side Al-Rayyan SC in the 2021 AFC Champions League group stage match. He went on to play 5 games for the club in group stage matches.

== Career statistics ==
=== Club ===
As of 19 March 2025

Club	Season	League			Cup		AFC		Total	
Club	Season	Division	Apps	Goals	Apps	Goals	Apps	Goals	Apps	Goals
Chennai City	2017–18	I-League	15	1	1 (Note: Appearance(s) in Super Cup)	0	—		16	1
Chennai City	2018–19	I-League	19	2	3	0	—		22	2
Chennai City	Total		34	3	4	0	0	0	38	3
Goa	2020–21	Indian Super League	21	1	0	0	5 (Note: Appearance(s) in AFC Champions League)	0	26	1
Goa	2021–22	Indian Super League	9	2	5 (Note: Appearance(s) in Durand Cup)	1	—		14	3
Goa	Total		30	3	5	1	5	0	40	4
Mohun Bagan (loan)	2019–20	I-League	7	1	4	0	—		11	1
Chennaiyin	2022–23	Indian Super League	0	0	0	0	—		0	0
Chennaiyin	2023–24	Indian Super League	10	0	6	0	—		16	0
Chennaiyin	2024–25	Indian Super League	0	0	3	1	—		3	1
Chennaiyin	Total		10	0	9	1	0	0	19	1
Gokulam Kerala	2024–25	I-League	0	0	0	0	—		0	0
Churchill Brothers (loan)	2024–25	I-League	5	0	0	0	—		5	0
Career total			86	7	22	2	5	0	113	9

== Honours ==
Goa

- Durand Cup: 2021
