= Iván Garrido (footballer, born 1990) =

Spanish footballer

Iván González
Personal information
- Full name: Iván Garrido González
- Date of birth: 2 February 1990 (age 36)
- Place of birth: Parla, Spain
- Height: 1.81 m (5 ft 11 1/2 in)
- Position: Centre-back

Team information
- Current team: Móstoles URJC

Youth career
- 2000–2002: Parla
- 2002–2008: Real Madrid

Senior career*
Years	Team	Apps	(Gls)
2008–2012	Real Madrid C	99	(0)
2012–2013	Deportivo B	28	(0)
2013–2014	Conquense	31	(0)
2014–2015	Cultural Leonesa	34	(0)
2015–2016	Racing Ferrol	37	(2)
2016–2020	Cultural Leonesa	122	(6)
2020–2022	Goa	36	(3)
2022–2023	East Bengal	15	(0)
2023–2025	Toledo	39	(2)
2025–	Móstoles URJC	3	(0)
- * Club domestic league appearances and goals as of 8 November 2025

Iván Garrido González (born 2 February 1990) is a Spanish professional footballer who plays as a defender for Tercera Federación club Móstoles URJC.

== Club career ==
Born in Parla, Madrid, Garrido joined Real Madrid's youth setup in 2002 at the age of 12, from locals AD Parla. He made his senior debut with the C-team in the 2008–09 season, in Tercera División.

On 29 July 2012 Garrido moved to another reserve team, Deportivo de La Coruña B also in the fourth tier. On 12 August of the following year he signed for Segunda División B club UB Conquense, being a regular starter for both sides.

On 23 July 2014 Garrido joined fellow third division club Cultural Leonesa. After a one-year spell at Racing de Ferrol he returned to the club, and contributed with 39 matches (play-offs included) as his side achieved promotion to Segunda División after 42 years.

Garrido made his professional debut on 18 August 2017, starting in a 0–2 away loss against Lorca FC.

=== FC Goa ===
In 2020, Garrido signed with Indian Super League side FC Goa on a two-year deal. He then appeared in the 2021 AFC Champions League group stage matches for Goa.

In 2021, he appeared with Goa at the 130th edition of Durand Cup and reached to the final, defeating Bengaluru FC 7–6 in sudden death. On 3 October, FC Goa clinched their first ever Durand Cup title defeating Mohammedan SC 1–0.

=== East Bengal ===
In August 2022, González was announced as one of the five foreigners signed by East Bengal for the upcoming season, on a two-year deal.

On 25 August, he made his debut against Rajasthan United in the Durand Cup, which ended in a 0–0 stalemate. He came on as a half-time substitute for Charalambos Kyriakou.

== Club statistics ==
=== Club ===
As of 25 February 2023

Club	Season	League			Cup		Continental		Total	
Club	Season	Division	Apps	Goals	Apps	Goals	Apps	Goals	Apps	Goals
Conquense	2013–14	Segunda División B	31	0	0	0	—		31	0
Cultural; Leonesa	2014–15	Segunda División B	34	0	0	0	—		34	0
Racing Ferrol	2015–16	Segunda División B	37	2	2 (Note: Appearance(s) in Copa del Rey)	0	—		39	2
Cultural; Leonesa	2016–17	Segunda División B	39	0	5	0	—		44	0
Cultural; Leonesa	2017–18	LaLiga 2	26	1	0	0	—		26	1
Cultural; Leonesa	2018–19	Segunda División B	34	3	4	0	—		38	3
Cultural; Leonesa	2019–20	Segunda División B	23	2	3	0	—		26	2
Cultural; Leonesa	Cultural Leonesa total		122	6	12	0	0	0	134	6
Goa	2020–21	Indian Super League	19	2	0	0	5 (Note: Appearance(s) in AFC Champions League)	0	24	2
Goa	2021–22	Indian Super League	17	1	2 (Note: Appearance(s) in Durand Cup)	0	—		19	1
Goa	Goa total		36	3	2	0	5	0	43	3
East Bengal	2022–23	Indian Super League	15	0	2	0	—		17	0
Career total			275	11	18	0	5	0	298	11

== Honours ==
Cultural Leonesa

- Segunda División B: 2016–17

Goa

- Durand Cup: 2021
