= Yousif Umar =

Qatari professional footballer

Yousif Umar يوسف عمر
Personal information
- Full name: Yousif Umar Fakharuddin
- Date of birth: 23 August 1999 (age 27)
- Place of birth: Qatar
- Position: Defender

Youth career
- Aspire Academy
- Al-Rayyan

Senior career*
Years	Team	Apps	(Gls)
2019–2025	Al-Rayyan	8	(0)
2022–2023	→ Umm Salal (loan)	4	(0)
2024	→ Al-Khor (loan)	0	(0)
2025–2026	Muaither	0	(0)
- * Club domestic league appearances and goals

Yousif Umar Fakharuddin (Arabic: يوسف عمر فخر الدين; born 23 August 1999) is a Qatari professional footballer who plays as a defender.

== Career ==
Yousif started his career at the youth team of Al-Rayyan and represented the club at every level.

== Career statistics ==
=== Club ===
As of 24 December 2020.

== Career statistics ==
Club	Season	League			Cup		Continental		Other		Total	
Club	Season	Division	Apps	Goals	Apps	Goals	Apps	Goals	Apps	Goals	Apps	Goals
Al-Rayyan	2019–20	Qatar Stars League	0	0	4	0	2	0	—		6	0
Al-Rayyan	2020–21	Qatar Stars League	1	0	6	0	0	—	—		7	0
Career totals			1	0	10	0	2	0	0	0	13	0
