= Edu Bedia =

Spanish footballer (born 1989)

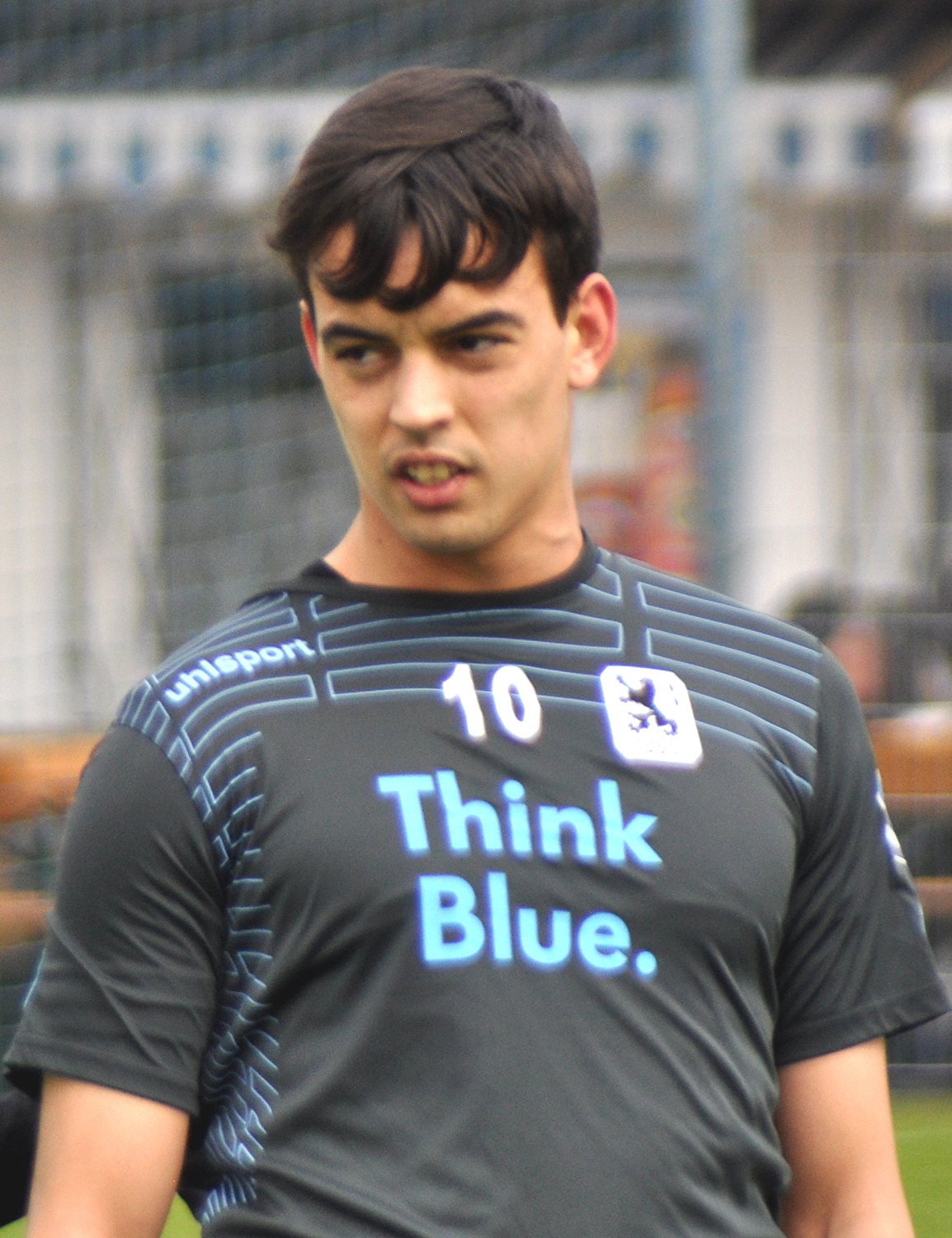
- Bedia with 1860 Munich in 2015

Personal information
- Full name: Eduardo Bedia Peláez
- Date of birth: 23 March 1989 (age 37)
- Place of birth: Santander, Spain
- Height: 1.84 m (6 ft 0 in)
- Position: Central midfielder

Team information
- Current team: Atlético Albericia

Youth career
- 1999–2007: Racing Santander

Senior career*
Years	Team	Apps	(Gls)
2007–2009	Racing B	44	(13)
2008–2012	Racing Santander	34	(0)
2011	→ Salamanca (loan)	19	(2)
2012–2013	Hércules	33	(5)
2013–2014	Barcelona B	39	(7)
2014–2015	1860 Munich	9	(0)
2015–2017	Oviedo	31	(0)
2017	Zaragoza	14	(1)
2017–2023	Goa	105	(13)
2023–2024	Gokulam Kerala	10	(0)
2024–2025	Gimnástica	16	(0)
2025–	Atlético Albericia	26	(1)

International career
2009	Spain U20	5	(0)
2009	Spain U21	2	(0)
- * Club domestic league appearances and goals as of 15:26, 15 January 2026 (UTC)

Eduardo 'Edu' Bedia Peláez (born 23 March 1989) is a Spanish professional footballer who plays as a central midfielder for Tercera Federación club Atlético Albericia.

== Club career ==
=== Spain and Germany ===
Born in Santander, Cantabria, Bedia was a product of his hometown club Racing de Santander's youth ranks, making his first-team (and La Liga) debut on 24 September 2008 by starting and playing the first half of a 2–0 away loss against Villarreal CF. In a season where the main squad eventually escaped relegation while still having to appear in the UEFA Cup, he managed to take part in a further 16 competitive games, scoring goals against FC Honka and Real Murcia CF, the former in European competition.

In January 2011, Bedia was loaned to UD Salamanca of the Segunda División, totalling 1,119 minutes during his five-month spell but suffering relegation. Subsequently, returned to Racing and the top flight, he met the same fate at the end of the campaign.

Bedia continued in the second division the following years, with Hércules CF and FC Barcelona Atlètic. On 16 June 2014, both he and Barça B teammate Ilie Sánchez signed with TSV 1860 Munich of the German 2. Bundesliga.

On 13 July 2015, Bedia signed a two-year deal with Real Oviedo, newly promoted to the second tier. On 19 January 2017, he moved to Real Zaragoza in the same league.

=== Goa ===
On 2 September 2017, Bedia joined Indian Super League franchise FC Goa on a two-year contract. In his second season, he scored seven goals as the side reached the final; this put him fifth on the scoring charts led by his compatriot and teammate Coro.

In June 2020, Bedia signed a new two-year deal. He was appointed as captain ahead of that season, and represented them in the 2021 edition of the AFC Champions League, scoring in a 2–1 defeat at Persepolis F.C. on 20 April; in the process, he became the first player to achieve this feat for an Indian club in the competition's group stage.

Bedia appeared with his side in the 2021 Durand Cup: in the semi-finals, he was named player of the match as they defeated Bengaluru FC 7–6 in sudden death. In the decisive game, against Mohammedan SC on 3 October, he scored the lone goal through an extra-time free kick.

=== Later career ===
On 29 August 2023, I-League club Gokulam Kerala FC announced the signing of Bedia on a one-year contract. He returned to Spain aged 34, seeing out his career in Cantabrian amateur football.

== Career statistics ==
As of 16 December 2023

Appearances and goals by club, season and competition
Club	Season	League			Cup		Continental		Total	
Club	Season	Division	Apps	Goals	Apps	Goals	Apps	Goals	Apps	Goals
Racing Santander	2007–08	La Liga	0	0	0	0	—		0	0
Racing Santander	2008–09	La Liga	12	0	2	1	3 (Note: Appearances in UEFA Cup)	1	17	2
Racing Santander	2009–10	La Liga	5	0	0	0	—		5	9
Racing Santander	2010–11	La Liga	6	0	2	1	—		8	1
Racing Santander	2011–12	La Liga	11	0	3	0	—		14	0
Racing Santander	Total		34	0	7	2	3	1	44	3
Salamanca (loan)	2010–11	Segunda División	19	2	0	0	—		19	2
Hércules	2012–13	Segunda División	33	5	1	0	—		34	5
Barcelona B	2013–14	Segunda División	39	7	—		—		39	7
1860 Munich	2014–15	2. Bundesliga	9	0	1	0	—		10	0
Oviedo	2015–16	Segunda División	24	0	2	0	—		26	0
Oviedo	2016–17	Segunda División	7	0	1	0	—		8	0
Oviedo	Total		31	0	3	0	0	0	34	0
Zaragoza	2016–17	Segunda División	14	1	0	0	—		14	1
Goa	2017–18	Indian Super League	18	1	3 (Note: Appearances in Super Cup)	0	–		21	1
Goa	2018–19	Indian Super League	20	7	3	1	–		23	8
Goa	2019–20	Indian Super League	13	1	0	0	–		13	1
Goa	2020–21	Indian Super League	20	0	0	0	4 (Note: Appearances in AFC Champions League)	1	24	1
Goa	2021–22	Indian Super League	16	1	5 (Note: Appearances in Durand Cup)	1	–		21	2
Goa	2022–23	Indian Super League	18	3	2	0	–		20	3
Goa	Total		105	13	13	2	4	1	122	16
Gokulam Kerala	2023–24	I-League	10	0	0	0	–		10	0
Career total			294	28	25	4	7	2	326	34

== Honours ==
Goa

- ISL League Winners Shield: 2019–20
- Super Cup: 2019
- Durand Cup: 2021

Spain U20

- Mediterranean Games: 2009
