= Delta Corp =

Indian casino company pvt ltd

Delta Corp Limited
- Type: Public
- Traded as: BSE: 532848; NSE: DELTACORP
- Industry: Casino; Hospitality
- Founded: 1985; 41 years ago
- Headquarters: Delta House, Hornby Vellard Estate, Dr. Annie Besant Road, Next to Copper Chimney, Worli, Mumbai – 400018, Pune, Maharashtra, India
- Area served: Worldwide
- Key people: Jaydev Mody (chairman)
- Revenue: ▲₹1,067 crore (US$110 million) (FY23)
- Net income: ▲₹261 crore (US$27 million) (FY23)
- Website: www.deltacorp.in

Delta Corp Limited, formerly Arrow Webtex Limited, is an Indian public company specializing in gaming and hospitality. The firm's primary assets encompass offshore casino and hospitality services, operating under the Deltin Casinos & Hotels brand. The company engages in various forms of casino gaming, including live and electronic gaming, with a significant focus on operations in Goa.

== History ==
Delta Corp Limited was initially established on 5 November 1985, as a privately held company known as Creole Holdings Company Private Limited. Following the acquisition of shares by the Finolex Group, the company underwent a transition into a deemed public limited company and changed its name to Creole Holdings Company Ltd on 2 June 1992. During the period of 2003–04, Finolex Cables Limited divested its shareholdings, leading to the company no longer being a subsidiary. On 25 September 2003, the company was transformed into a private limited company. In 2007, it was rebranded as Arrow Webtex Limited, and in 2008, it adopted its current name, Delta Corp Limited.

== Divisions ==
=== Offshore casinos and casino hotels ===
On 1 December 2015, Delta Corp Limited announced that it had been granted a license to operate a casino at its Deltin Suite hotel in Goa. Subsequently, the Government of Goa extended the company's offshore casino license to allow on the Mandovi River, with annual renewals subject to license fees and compliance with government regulations.

As of 2026, Delta Corp holds three of the six offshore gaming licenses issued in Goa and operates a land-based casino in Goa. Additionally, the company operates India's largest integrated five-star resort in Daman, known as The Deltin

== See also ==
- Casino Goa
- Deltin Casinos & Hotels
