= Abdurahman Al-Korbi =

Qatari footballer (born 1994)

Personal information
- Full name: Abdurahman Mohammed Al-Korbi
- Date of birth: 18 August 1994 (age 32)
- Place of birth: Qatar
- Position: Midfielder

Youth career
- Al-Rayyan

Senior career*
Years	Team	Apps	(Gls)
2013–2023	Al-Rayyan	100	(0)
2023–2025	Qatar	2	(0)
2025–2026	Muaither	1	(0)
- * Club domestic league appearances and goals

Abdurahman Al-Korbi (Arabic: عبد الرحمن الكربي; born 18 August 1994) is a Qatari footballer who currently plays as a midfielder.
