= Ishan Pandita =

Indian footballer (born 1998)

Personal information
- Full name: Ishan Pandita
- Date of birth: 26 May 1998 (age 28)
- Place of birth: New Delhi, India
- Height: 1.83 m (6 ft 0 in)
- Position: Striker

Team information
- Current team: Samaleswari

Youth career
- 2014–2015: Alcobendas
- 2015–2016: Almería
- 2016–2017: Leganés
- 2017–2018: Gimnàstic

Senior career*
| Years | Team | Apps | (Gls) |
| 2018–2019 | Pobla Mafumet | 32 | (6) |
| 2019–2020 | Lorca | 36 | (8) |
| 2020–2021 | Goa | 11 | (4) |
| 2021–2023 | Jamshedpur | 34 | (5) |
| 2023–2025 | Kerala Blasters | 18 | (0) |
| 2025 | Malappuram | 3 | (1) |
| 2026 | Goa | 6 | (0) |
| 2026– | Samaleswari | 0 | (0) |

International career^{‡}
| 2021– | India | 8 | (2) |
- * Club domestic league appearances and goals as of 13:30, 18 May 2026 (UTC) ‡ National team caps and goals as of 17:30, 21 February 2024 (UTC)

Ishan Pandita (born 26 May 1998) is an Indian professional footballer who plays as a forward for Indian Football League club Samaleswari and the India national team.

== Club career ==
=== Early and youth career ===
Pandita moved to the Philippines, where he attended British school in Manila and took football training. He returned to Bengaluru at the age of eleven, and then appeared with Student Unions and Bangalore Yellows. He soon gained recognition in BDCA Division A and C state soccer leagues. IF Brommapojkarna spotted Pandita and included in their U17 side after his brilliant performance at the 2013 Gothia Cup in Sweden.

Pandita moved to Spain in 2014 at the age of 16 and joined Alcobendas Juvenil. In 2015, he joined the Under-18 team of La Liga club Almería but he did not sign a professional contract as he had not turned 18 that time. In the 2016, he joined the U-19 team of Leganés. He was the first ever Indian footballer to play for a Juvenil side of a Spanish top division club. After a spell at Leganes, he signed a short-term contract with the U-23 team of Gimnàstic on 5 January 2019.

=== Pobla Mafumet ===
Ishan signed his first senior contract for the farm club of Gimnàstic, Pobla Mafumet in early 2019. He played only one match for the club throughout his debut season and left the club.

=== Lorca ===
In August 2019, he signed a one-year deal with Tercera Division Club Lorca. He played 26 matches and scored 6 goals and was the top scorer for the club in the 2019–20 season.

=== Goa ===
Initially he and his family wanted to stay in Spain, but due to the COVID-19 situation it was difficult to find a club for him. In early 2020, rumours spread about Pandita's return to India and it was speculated that he might sign for Goa. In October 2020, the club revealed that it had secured Pandita in their squad. He made his debut for FC Goa on 30 November 2020 against NorthEast United at 89th minute of that match as a substitute. He scored his debut goal for FC Goa against Hyderabad on 30 December 2020. He came as a substitute on 86th minute and scored with his first touch on the 87th minute as FC Goa equalised the game.

He has also represented FC Goa at the 2021 AFC Champions League, in which they achieved third place in group stages.

=== Jamshedpur ===
On 2 September 2021, it was announced that Pandita was signed by Jamshedpur on a two-year deal for a fee reported around ₹6 Million, ahead of the 2021–22 Indian Super League season. He scored his first goal for the club in their 3–2 win against NorthEast United on 6 January 2022.

=== Kerala Blasters ===
On 10 August 2023, Kerala Blasters announced the signing of Pandita on a two-year deal with an option to extend for one more year. He made his debut for the club on 18 August, by coming as a substitute in the 60th minute in a match against Bengaluru FC reserves during the 2023 Durand Cup. On 21 October, Pandita made his debut for the club in the Indian Super League against NorthEast United FC at home, by coming as a substitute in the 78th minute which ended in 1–1 draw.

Despite not scoring a single goal for the Blasters during his debut season, Pandita opened his account in the Blasters' first competitive match of the 2024–25 season against Mumbai City FC on 1 August 2024 in the Durand Cup. He came on as a substitute in the second half, replacing hat-trick scorer Kwame Peprah. Pandita then completed a brace in quick succession, scoring in the 86th and 87th minutes, as the Blasters secured a record-breaking 8–0 victory in the 2024 Durand Cup.

== International career ==
Pandita's performances in his debut season in the ISL were noticed, and subsequently he earned a call-up to the India national team in March 2021, ahead of India's friendlies against Oman and UAE. On 25 March, he made his debut in 1–1 draw against Oman. Ishan scored for India during a practice game against I-League All-Stars on 18 May 2022 in Kolkata. He scored his first international goal on 14 June against Hong Kong in their 4–0 win at the 2023 AFC Asian Cup qualification.

In September, he participated at the 2022 VFF Tri-Nations Series in Vietnam, where India finished as runners-up. He appeared in India's second match in group stage, against Uzbekistan at the 2023 AFC Asian Cup on 18 January 2024, in their 3–0 defeat.

== Personal life ==
Ishan Pandita was born on 26 May 1998 in Delhi to a family originating in Tral, Kashmir. He then moved to Bengaluru, but stayed there not longer and moved to Spain as he desired to play better football there. After spending a term of six years in various lower division Spanish clubs, he returned to India and signed for Goa.

== Career statistics ==
=== Club ===
As of 7 March 2025

| Club | Season | League | | | Cup | | AFC | | Other | | Total | |
| Club | Season | Division | Apps | Goals | Apps | Goals | Apps | Goals | Apps | Goals | Apps | Goals |
|---|---|---|---|---|---|---|---|---|---|---|---|---|
| Pobla Mafumet | 2018–19 | Tercera División | 1 | 0 | 0 | 0 | – | | – | | 1 | 0 |
| Lorca | 2019–20 | Tercera División | 23 | 4 | 2 | 1 | – | | – | | 25 | 5 |
| Goa | 2020–21 | Indian Super League | 11 | 4 | 0 | 0 | 6 (Note: Appearance(s) in AFC Champions League) | 0 | – | | 17 | 4 |
| Jamshedpur | 2021–22 | Indian Super League | 17 | 3 | 0 | 0 | – | | – | | 17 | 3 |
| Jamshedpur | 2022–23 | Indian Super League | 17 | 2 | 2 (Note: Appearance(s) in Super Cup) | 1 | – | | 1 (Note: Appearance(s) in play-offs for AFC Champions League) | 0 | 20 | 3 |
| Jamshedpur | Total | | 34 | 5 | 2 | 1 | 0 | 0 | 1 | 0 | 37 | 6 |
| Kerala Blasters | 2023–24 | Indian Super League | 15 | 0 | 0 | 0 | – | | 2 (Note: Appearance(s) in Durand Cup) | 0 | 17 | 0 |
| Kerala Blasters | 2024–25 | Indian Super League | 3 | 0 | 0 | 0 | – | | 1 | 2 | 4 | 2 |
| Kerala Blasters | Total | | 18 | 0 | 0 | 0 | 0 | 0 | 3 | 2 | 21 | 2 |
| Career total | | | 87 | 13 | 4 | 2 | 6 | 0 | 4 | 2 | 101 | 17 |

=== International ===
As of 21 February 2024

| National team | Year | Apps | Goals |
|---|---|---|---|
| India | 2021 | 2 | 0 |
| India | 2022 | 4 | 1 |
| India | 2023 | 1 | 0 |
| India | 2024 | 1 | 0 |
| Total | | 8 | 1 |

==== International goals ====
Scores and results list India's goal tally first

| No. | Date | Venue | Cap | Opponent | Score | Result | Competition | Ref. |
|---|---|---|---|---|---|---|---|---|
| 1. | 14 June 2022 | Salt Lake Stadium, Kolkata, India | 4 | Hong Kong | 4–0 | 4–0 | 2023 AFC Asian Cup qualification | |

== Honours ==
Jamshedpur

- Indian Super League Shield: 2021–22

== See also ==
- List of Indian expatriate footballers
