= Jorge Ortiz (Spanish footballer) =

Spanish footballer

Personal information
- Full name: Jorge Ortiz Mendoza
- Date of birth: 25 April 1992 (age 34)
- Place of birth: Villacañas, Spain
- Height: 1.73 m (5 ft 8 in)
- Position: Forward

Team information
- Current team: Goa

Youth career
- Getafe

Senior career*
| Years | Team | Apps | (Gls) |
| 2011–2012 | Madridejos | 20 | (5) |
| 2012–2013 | Albacete B | 26 | (5) |
| 2013 | Villarrobledo | 8 | (0) |
| 2013–2014 | Internacional Madrid | 38 | (2) |
| 2014–2015 | Alcorcón B | 28 | (10) |
| 2015 | Alcorcón | 3 | (0) |
| 2015–2016 | Fuenlabrada | 36 | (7) |
| 2016–2017 | Oviedo | 4 | (0) |
| 2018 | Atlético Madrid B | 19 | (3) |
| 2018–2019 | Cultural Leonesa | 29 | (4) |
| 2019–2020 | Atlético Baleares | 20 | (8) |
| 2020–2022 | Goa | 36 | (14) |
| 2022–2024 | Shenzhen Peng City | 54 | (15) |
| 2025–2026 | Mumbai City | 16 | (0) |
| 2026– | Goa | 1 | (0) |
- * Club domestic league appearances and goals as of 10 october 2026

Jorge Ortiz Mendoza (born 25 April 1992) is a Spanish professional footballer who plays as a forward for Indian Super League club Goa.

== Club career ==
Born in Villacañas, Toledo, Castilla–La Mancha, Ortiz graduated from Getafe CF's youth system, making his debut as a senior with CD Madridejos in the Tercera División. In summer 2012 he moved to Albacete Balompié, starting out with the reserves also in the fourth tier.

On 18 January 2013, Ortiz signed for CP Villarrobledo of the same league. After featuring sparingly, he joined Internacional de Madrid on 23 August.

Ortiz signed with AD Alcorcón on 21 June 2014, being assigned to the B team still in division four. His first game as a professional with the main squad took place on 24 May 2015, as he came on as a second-half substitute for Facundo Guichón in a 3–0 away loss against Real Betis in the Segunda División.

On 9 July 2015, Ortiz joined Segunda División B club CF Fuenlabrada. Roughly one year later, he returned to the second division after agreeing to a two-year contract at Real Oviedo.

Ortiz spent the next three seasons in the Spanish lower leagues, with Atlético Madrid B, Cultural y Deportiva Leonesa and CD Atlético Baleares. On 6 August 2020, he moved to the Indian Super League with FC Goa on a two-year deal as a free agent.

During his spell in India, Ortiz appeared in AFC Champions League, scoring in the 1–1 group-stage draw at Al-Rayyan SC on 26 April 2021. On 3 October that year, his team clinched their first ever Durand Cup title after defeating Mohammedan SC 1–0, but he did not take the field in Kolkata.

On 11 April 2022, Ortiz joined China League One club Shenzhen Peng City FC. He returned to the Indian top division in January 2025, on an 18-month contract at Mumbai City FC. He scored his first goal for the latter on 27 October, their second in a 4–1 away win over SC Delhi in the group phase of the AIFF Super Cup.

On 11 April 2022, Ortiz joined China League One club Shenzhen Peng City FC. He returned to the Indian top division in January 2025, on an 18-month contract at Mumbai City FC. He scored his first goal for the latter on 27 October, their second in a 4–1 away win over SC Delhi in the group phase of the AIFF Super Cup.

Ortiz left Mumbai upon the expiration of his contract. In September 2026, he rejoined Goa on a one-year deal.

== Career statistics ==
As of match played 21 May 2026

Appearances and goals by club, season and competition
| Club | Season | League | | | Cup | | Continental | | Other | | Total | |
| Club | Season | Division | Apps | Goals | Apps | Goals | Apps | Goals | Apps | Goals | Apps | Goals |
|---|---|---|---|---|---|---|---|---|---|---|---|---|
| Alcorcón | 2014–15 | Segunda División | 3 | 0 | 0 | 0 | — | | — | | 3 | 0 |
| Fuenlabrada | 2015–16 | Segunda División B | 36 | 7 | — | | — | | — | | 36 | 7 |
| Oviedo | 2016–17 | Segunda División | 4 | 0 | 0 | 0 | — | | — | | 4 | 0 |
| Atlético Madrid B | 2017–18 | Segunda División B | 19 | 3 | — | | — | | — | | 19 | 3 |
| Cultural Leonesa | 2018–19 | Segunda División B | 29 | 4 | 4 (Note: Appearances in Copa del Rey) | 0 | — | | — | | 33 | 4 |
| Atlético Baleares | 2019–20 | Segunda División B | 22 | 8 | 1 | 0 | — | | — | | 23 | 8 |
| Goa | 2020–21 | Indian Super League | 21 | 6 | 0 | 0 | 5 (Note: Appearances in AFC Champions League) | 1 | — | | 26 | 7 |
| Goa | 2021–22 | Indian Super League | 15 | 8 | 1 (Note: Appearances in Durand Cup) | 1 | — | | — | | 16 | 9 |
| Goa | Total | | 36 | 14 | 1 | 1 | 5 | 1 | — | | 42 | 16 |
| Sichuan Jiuniu/ Shenzhen Peng City | 2022 | China League One | 22 | 2 | 1 (Note: Appearances in Chinese FA Cup) | 0 | — | | — | | 23 | 2 |
| Sichuan Jiuniu/ Shenzhen Peng City | 2023 | China League One | 18 | 11 | 0 | 0 | — | | — | | 18 | 11 |
| Sichuan Jiuniu/ Shenzhen Peng City | 2024 | Chinese Super League | 14 | 2 | 1 | 0 | — | | — | | 15 | 2 |
| Sichuan Jiuniu/ Shenzhen Peng City | Total | | 54 | 15 | 2 | 0 | — | | — | | 56 | 15 |
| Mumbai City | 2024–25 | Indian Super League | 9 | 0 | — | | — | | 3 (Note: Appearances in AIFF Super Cup) | 0 | 12 | 0 |
| Mumbai City | 2025–26 | Indian Super League | 7 | 0 | — | | — | | 4 | 1 | 11 | 1 |
| Mumbai City | Total | | 16 | 0 | — | | — | | 7 | 1 | 23 | 1 |
| Career total | | | 219 | 51 | 8 | 1 | 5 | 1 | 7 | 1 | 239 | 54 |

== Honours ==
Goa

- Durand Cup: 2021

Shenzhen Peng City

- China League One: 2023
