= Naveen Kumar (footballer) =

Indian footballer (born 1989)

Personal information
- Date of birth: 10 August 1989 (age 37)
- Place of birth: Kalewal Bhagtan, Hoshiarpur, Punjab
- Height: 1.83 m (6 ft 0 in)
- Position: Goalkeeper

Team information
- Current team: Delhi FC
- Number: 32

Youth career
- 2009–2011: JCT F.C.

Senior career*
Years	Team	Apps	(Gls)
2011–2012	Pailan Arrows	30	(0)
2012–2013	Mohun Bagan	30	(0)
2014	Lonestar Kashmir	29	(0)
2015–2016	Salgaocar	30	(0)
2016–2017	Churchill Brothers	29	(0)
2017–2018	FC Goa	17	(0)
2018–2019	Kerala Blasters	15	(0)
2019–2022	FC Goa	21	(0)
2022–2023	East Bengal		
2023–	Delhi FC	18	(0)

International career
2003	India U23	1	(0)
- * Club domestic league appearances and goals

Naveen Kumar is an Indian professional football player who plays as a goalkeeper for Delhi FC.

== Club career ==
Naveen Kumar started the 2011–12 season during the 2011 Indian Federation Cup with the I-League team Pailan Arrows. He played in all of Pailan's three matches. For 2012–13 he was signed by Mohun Bagan A.C. Naveen Kumar returned to the I-league with Salgaocar in August 2015. In January 2019, after 15 games with Kerala Blasters, he came back to FC Goa.

== Honours ==
FC Goa

- Indian Super Cup: 2019
- Indian Super League Premiers: 2019–20
- Durand Cup: 2021
