= Reinaldo (footballer, born 1979) =

Brazilian footballer

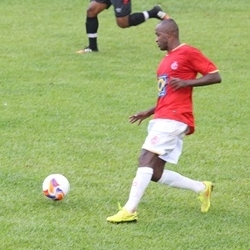
- Reinaldo in 2015

Personal information
- Full name: Reinaldo da Cruz Oliveira
- Date of birth: 14 March 1979 (age 47)
- Place of birth: Itaguaí, Brazil
- Height: 1.87 m (6 ft 2 in)
- Position: Forward

Team information
- Current team: Sampaio Corrêa-RJ (head coach)

Youth career
- 1997–1999: Flamengo

Senior career*
Years	Team	Apps	(Gls)
1999–2001	Flamengo	40	(9)
2001–2005	Paris Saint-Germain	65	(10)
2001–2003	→ São Paulo (loan)	32	(16)
2005	Kashiwa Reysol	22	(16)
2006	Santos	28	(18)
2007	Al-Ittihad	21	(14)
2007–2008	JEF United Chiba	37	(14)
2009	Botafogo	23	(4)
2010	Suwon Bluewings	4	(0)
2010–2011	Figueirense	30	(10)
2011–2012	Bahia	17	(2)
2012	Guangdong Sunray Cave	27	(9)
2013	Paraná	22	(8)
2014	Metropolitano	11	(5)
2014	Luverdense	27	(4)
2015	Inter de Lages	15	(6)
2015	Goa	11	(7)
2016	Boavista SC	6	(1)
2016	Goa	4	(0)
2017–2019	Brasiliense	7	(2)
Total		449	(155)

Managerial career
- 2020: Inter de Lages
- 2021–2022: Perilima U20
- 2022: Nacional de Patos
- 2022: Carlos Renaux
- 2023–2026: Maricá
- 2026–: Sampaio Corrêa-RJ
- * Club domestic league appearances and goals

Reinaldo da Cruz Oliveira (born 14 March 1979) simply known as Reinaldo, is Brazilian football coach and former player who played as a forward. He is the current head coach of Sampaio Corrêa-RJ.

On 11 July 2019, it was announced that Reinaldo had retired.

== Managerial statistics ==
As of match played 8 February 2025

Managerial record by team and tenure
Team	Nat	From	To	Record							
Team	Nat	From	To	G	W	D	L	GF	GA	GD	Win %
Inter de Lages	(Brazil)	10 October 2020	22 December 2020	9	3	3	3	13	14	−1	33.33
Nacional de Patos	(Brazil)	1 January 2022	4 April 2022	8	4	1	3	20	15	+5	50.00
Carlos Renaux	(Brazil)	2 May 2022	30 September 2022	11	5	3	3	15	7	+8	45.45
Maricá	(Brazil)	2 January 2023	present	60	23	22	15	65	55	+10	38.33
Career total				88	35	29	24	113	91	+22	39.77

== Honours ==
=== Player ===
Flamengo

- Campeonato Carioca: 1999, 2000, 2001
- Taça Guanabara: 1999, 2001
- Taça Rio: 2001

Botafogo

- Taça Guanabara: 2009

Brasiliense

- Campeonato Brasiliense: 2017

=== Coach ===
Maricá

- Campeonato Carioca Série A2: 2024
- Copa Rio: 2024
