= 2021–22 FC Goa season =

2021–22 season of FC Goa

FC Goa
2021–22 season
- Stadium: GMC Athletic Stadium
- Indian Super League: 9th
- Durand Cup: Winners

The 2021–22 season is the club's eight season in existence and in the Indian Super League, since their establishment in 2014.

== Background ==
The ISL announced a rule limiting the number of foreign players, which would go in effect from the 2021–22 season.
