= FC Goa =

Association football club in India

Goa
- Full name: Football Club Goa
- Nickname: The Gaurs
- Short name: Goa
- Founded: 26 August 2014; 12 years ago
- Ground: Fatorda Stadium
- Capacity: 19,000
- Owner: Goan Football Club Pvt. Ltd.
- President: Akshay Tandon
- Head coach: Ángel Viadero
- League: Indian Super League
- 2025–26: Indian Super League, 7th of 14
- Website: fcgoa.in
Home colours	Away colours	Third colours

Football Club Goa is an Indian professional football club based in Fatorda, Goa, that competes in the Indian Super League (ISL), the top tier of Indian football. The club was established on 26 August 2014. Nicknamed as Gaurs, the club plays their home matches at the Fatorda Stadium in Margao. FC Goa is one of the most successful clubs in the ISL history, being the first ISL Club to qualify for AFC Champions League Elite.

Brazilian coach Zico was the first manager of the club. Their marquee players for their first two seasons were French winger Robert Pires and Brazilian defender Lúcio, respectively. The team finished the league stage in the second position in their first season. In the end-of-season play-offs, they lost via a penalty shootout against Atlético de Kolkata in the semi-finals after a goalless draw. The next year, the team came first in the league stage, then lost the final 3–2 to Chennaiyin at home.

In the 2018–19 season, they reached their second final in the league where they lost 1–0 to Bengaluru. In the same season, they beat Chennaiyin FC 2–1 in the 2019 Indian Super Cup to win their first national trophy. In the 2019–20 season, FC Goa topped the league stage, winning the first ISL League Winners Shield and qualifying for the AFC Champions League group stage.

== History ==
=== Foundation ===
One of the traditional regional powerhouses of Indian football, Goa was bound to be one of the cities to participate in the Indian Super League from its inception. In early 2014, it was announced that the All India Football Federation, the national federation for football in India, and IMG-Reliance would be accepting bids for ownership of eight of nine selected cities for the upcoming Indian Super League, an eight-team franchise league modelled along the lines of the Indian Premier League and Major League Soccer in the United States. On 13 April 2014, it was announced that Venugopal Dhoot had won the bidding for the Goa franchise along with Dattaraj Salgaocar and Shrinivas Dempo. The club was officially launched on 26 August 2014 at a well-attended ceremony at the Goa Marriott Resort and Spa in Miramar. The club represents Goa, the only state to declare football as its official sport. The logo of the club represents Goa's state animal the Gaur, while the colours blue and orange symbolizes the Goan coastline and sunrise.

On 23 September 2014, Indian cricketer Virat Kohli was unveiled as one of the co-owners. Bollywood actor Varun Dhawan was chosen as the brand ambassador of the club. FC Goa is the first Indian sports club to launch a satellite TV channel – FC Goa TV on Videocon D2H.

=== Zico era (2014–2016) ===
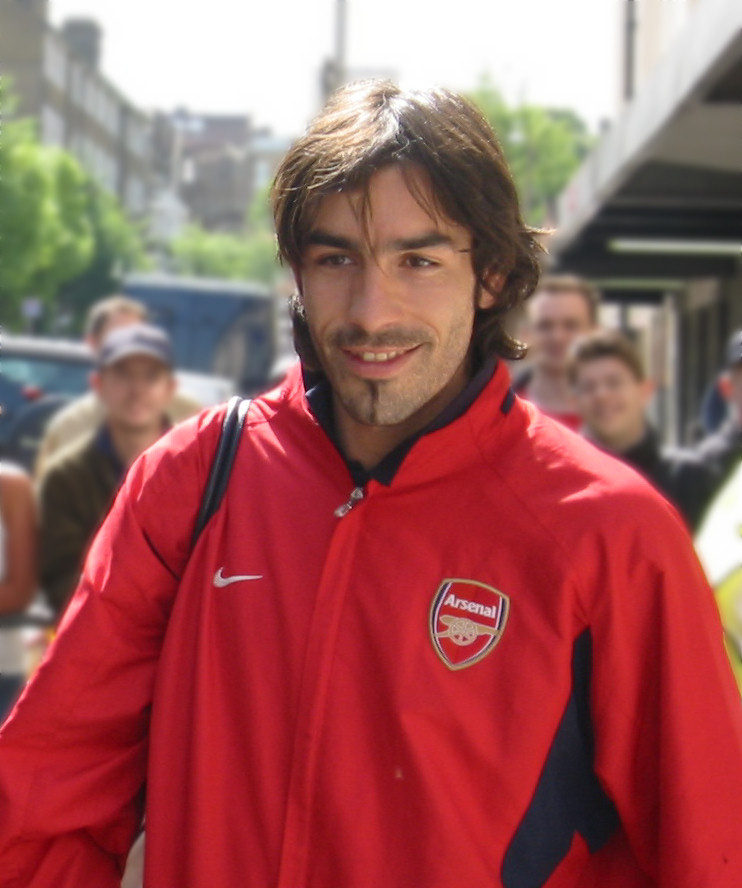
Robert Pires, the club's first marquee signing in the 2014 season.

Brazilian footballer Zico signed as the club's head coach on 2 September 2014. On 20 September 2014, FC Goa officially confirmed Premier League winner and former Arsenal footballer Robert Pires as their first marquee player. On 15 October 2014, FC Goa played their first Indian Super League match against Chennaiyin FC at the Fatorda Stadium, Goa. FC Goa lost four out of their first six matches but came back strongly in the second half of the tournament with five victories from their last eight encounters keeping five clean sheets in their 14 matches. Overall, Zico has done a remarkable job with six wins, four defeats and four draws, which took them to the second spot of the standings with 22 points. By finishing second in the league, the club qualified for the end-of-season play-offs, where they lost via a penalty shootout against Atlético de Kolkata in the semi-finals after a goalless draw. Particularly encouraging from the first season was the arrival of Romeo Fernandes on the national footballing scene. The Goan's consistent displays on the pitch quickly turned him into a fan favourite and attracted interest from lands as far as Brazil. His performances culminated in him being loaned out to Atletico Paranaense from parent club Dempo SC, where he became the first Indian to play professionally at the senior level in South America.

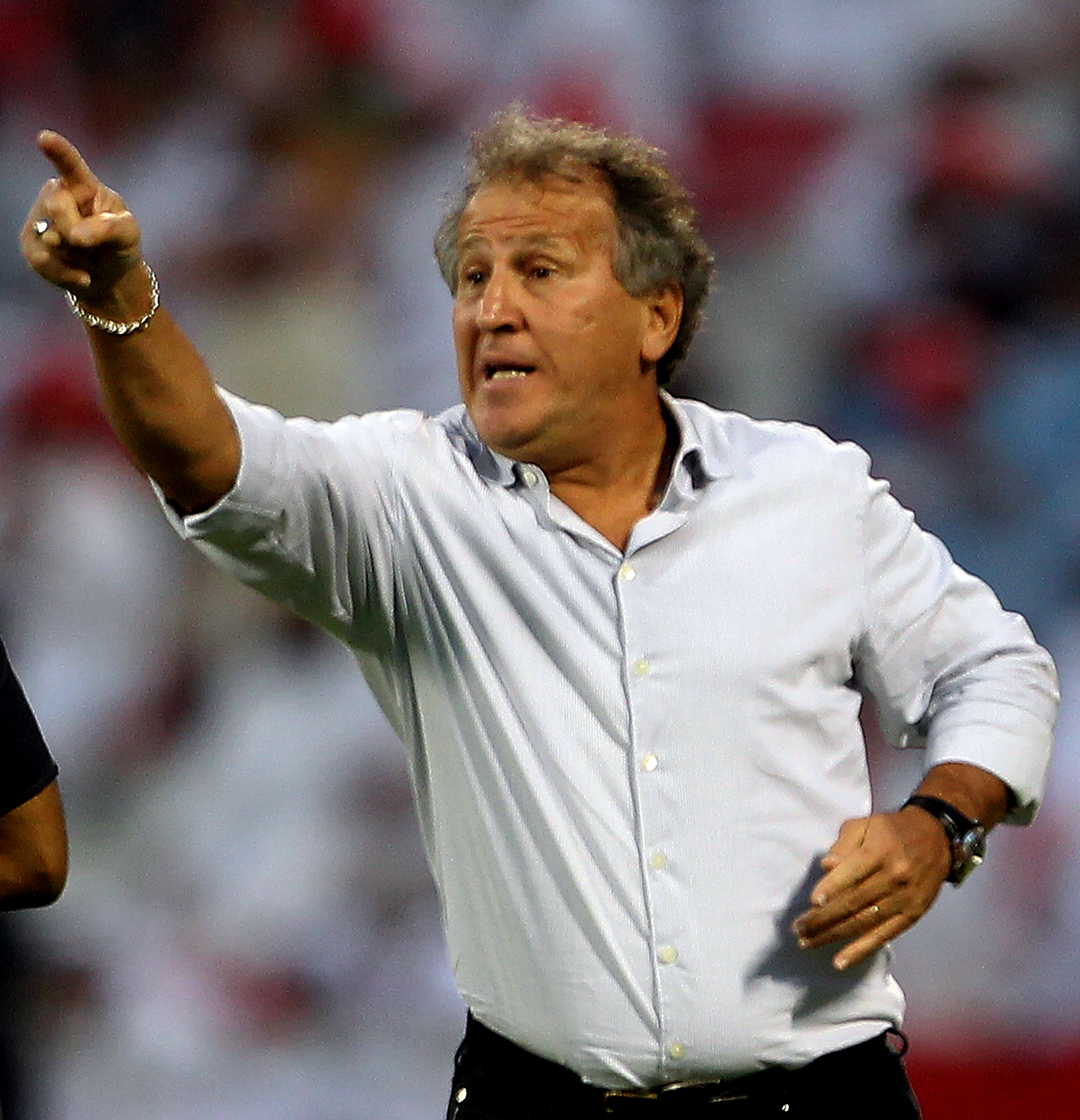
Zico, Goa's first head coach led them to the finals in the 2015 Indian Super League season.

FC Goa enjoyed a stellar 2015 season in the Indian Super League. Head coach Zico continued as the head coach of the franchise for a second successive year. After a good run in the 2014 season, much was expected from the team. Zico lined up an impressive team ahead of the season with veteran players like Leonardo Moura, Reinaldo Oliveira, and former La Masia youth product, Joffre Mateu who won the first season of the ISL with Atletico de Kolkata joining the ranks. Frenchman, Gregory Arnolin was the only international player retained from the first season with the club. The Indian contingent had familiar faces in Goan wingers Romeo Fernandes and Mandar Rao Dessai and goalkeeper Laxmikant Kattimani. FC Goa started the season in superb fashion with a commanding 2–0 victory over Delhi Dynamos and that set the tone for the season ahead. Under Zico's tutelage, FC Goa played an attacking brand of football and set the league alight as they finished the league stage of the campaign on top of the standings with 25 points, two clear of the second placed team with 7 victories along the way. In the process, FC Goa scored the most goals in the league stage, having netted 29 times. En route to the semi-finals, the Gaurs earned the record of having attained the highest margin of victory when they beat Mumbai City FC 7–0 in Fatorda. This victory included two players scoring hat-tricks (Dudu Omagbemi and T. Haokip) which was a first in the history of the league. After a 1–0 loss in the first leg of the semi-finals against Delhi Dynamos, FC Goa turned the tie on its head with a dominating 3–0 win at home. This provided them with a chance to win the ISL title at the Jawaharlal Nehru Stadium in Fatorda in front of the home fans. In the finals, a late surge by Chennaiyin FC saw FC Goa lose out on the title after a well contested match.

On 23 July 2016, Salgaocar and Dempo stepped down from the ownership of FC Goa. On 5 August 2016, new owner Jaydev Mody brought a 65% stake in the FC Goa team. Head coach Zico continued as the head coach of the franchise for his third and final season. FC Goa had a poor 2016 season after finishing last in the table and picking up only four victories throughout the season. They ended the disappointing season with 14 points and finished last in the table. Zico primarily blamed late preparations for FC Goa's failure which was caused due to the incoming of new owners just a few months before the start of the new season. His 3-year contract with FC Goa ended and did not renew it with the club.

=== Success under Lobera (2017–2020) ===
In the 2017–18 season, FC Goa won their first match of the 2017–18 Indian Super League 2–3 away against Chennaiyin, this was also their first competitive match under new coach Sergio Lobera, they later went on to lose against Chennayin FC in the semi-finals. Lobera in his second season led Goa to their second final against Bengaluru FC which they lost 0–1 after a late goal from Rahul Bheke in the second half of extra time. In the same season, Goa beat Chennaiyin FC 2–1 in the finals of the 2019 Indian Super Cup to win their first trophy. On 1 February 2020, Goa announced they mutually parted ways with head coach Sergio Lobera and his coaching staff after playing 15 games in the third season. Goa later went on to win the remaining three league games and topped the group stage and won the ISL League Winners Shield, they also became the first Indian club to qualify for AFC Champions League group stage in its current format. However, their 5–6 defeat on aggregate to Chennaiyin FC in the playoffs ended their chance of winning the elusive ISL trophy.

=== Recent history (2020–2021) ===
On 30 April 2020, Goa appointed Juan Ferrando as their head coach ahead of the new season. The club also announced their partnership with RB Leipzig for the youth development. The club had an impressive stint in the first year under coach Juan until they bowed in the semi-finals of 2020–21 Indian Super League season.

Under the guidance of Ferrando, FC Goa scripted history after scoring their first goal in the AFC Champions League on 20 April against Persepolis FC through a header by Edu Bedia. They finished third in Group E with 3 points ahead of Al Rayyan. In the competition, Dheeraj Singh made a whopping 26 saves in five matches to top the goalkeeping chart of the West Zone group stage.

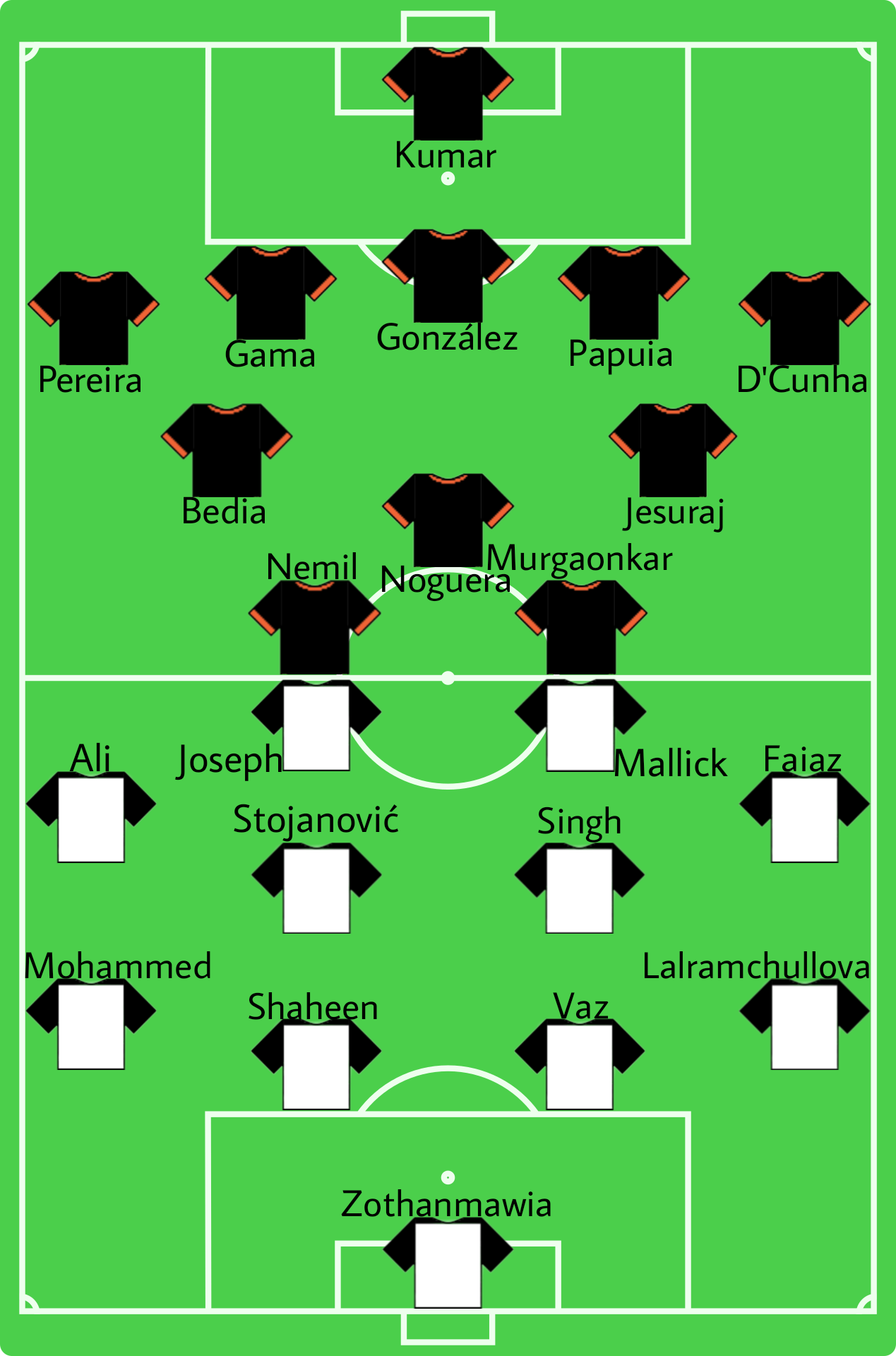
The line-up of 2021 Durand Cup final between FC Goa and Mohammedan Sporting

Goa participated in the 130th edition of Durand Cup and reached to the final, defeating Bengaluru FC 7–6 in sudden death. On 3 October 2021, they clinched their first Durand Cup title defeating Mohammedan Sporting 1–0. On 19 December 2021, club president Akshay Tandon announced that head coach Juan Ferrando had triggered his release clause to join ISL club ATK Mohun Bagan. On 21 December 2021, Derrick Pereira was appointed as the head coach.

=== Carlos Pena Era (2022–2023) ===
On 16 April 2022, FC Goa appointed Carlos Pena as the head coach. He played his first match as manager against East Bengal and won his first game as the manager. FC Goa failed to qualify ISL playoffs as well as Super Cup Semi Final. After the end of 2022–23 season Carlos Pena & Team management parted away.

=== Manolo Marquez Era (2023–2026) ===
After a lackluster season under Carlos Peña, FC Goa appointed former Hyderabad FC head man Manolo Marquez as their next head coach. Marquez had seen great prior success in Hyderabad, guiding the Nizams to their maiden ISL title in 2021–22 season and back to back second place finishes in the league stage in 2021–22 and 2022–23. Under Marquez, FC Goa opened the 2023–24 season with a 12 game unbeaten run, sitting on top of the table at the winter international break. This impressive run had Goa in the driver's seat to the league stage title, until a 3 game collapse saw the Gaurs tumble down the table. Marquez commented on the team's "lack of spirit" down the stretch, even going as far as to say the Gaurs were not deserving of the title after their recent performances. The team, however, bounced back, going unbeaten once again for the rest of the season with 5 wins in their last 7. Marquez lauded the team's effort and the Gaurs' turnaround following the losing spell, as they climbed as high as second in the table by the final matchday. Despite their late heroics however, Goa ended the league stage third in the table, narrowly missing out on the first-round bye and hosting Chennaiyin FC at home in the playoffs.

Goa took part in 2024 Bhausaheb Bandodkar Memorial Trophy, made headlines defeating A-League Men Brisbane Roar by 1–0 in a group stage match, in which Armando Sadiku scored the winner. Later, FC Goa defeated the Jamshedpur FC 3–0 in the 2025 Indian Super Cup final to win their second national cup title. As the winners, Goa have qualified for the 2025–26 AFC Champions League Two preliminary stage, where they beat Al-Seeb 2–1 to enter group stage.

== Stadium ==
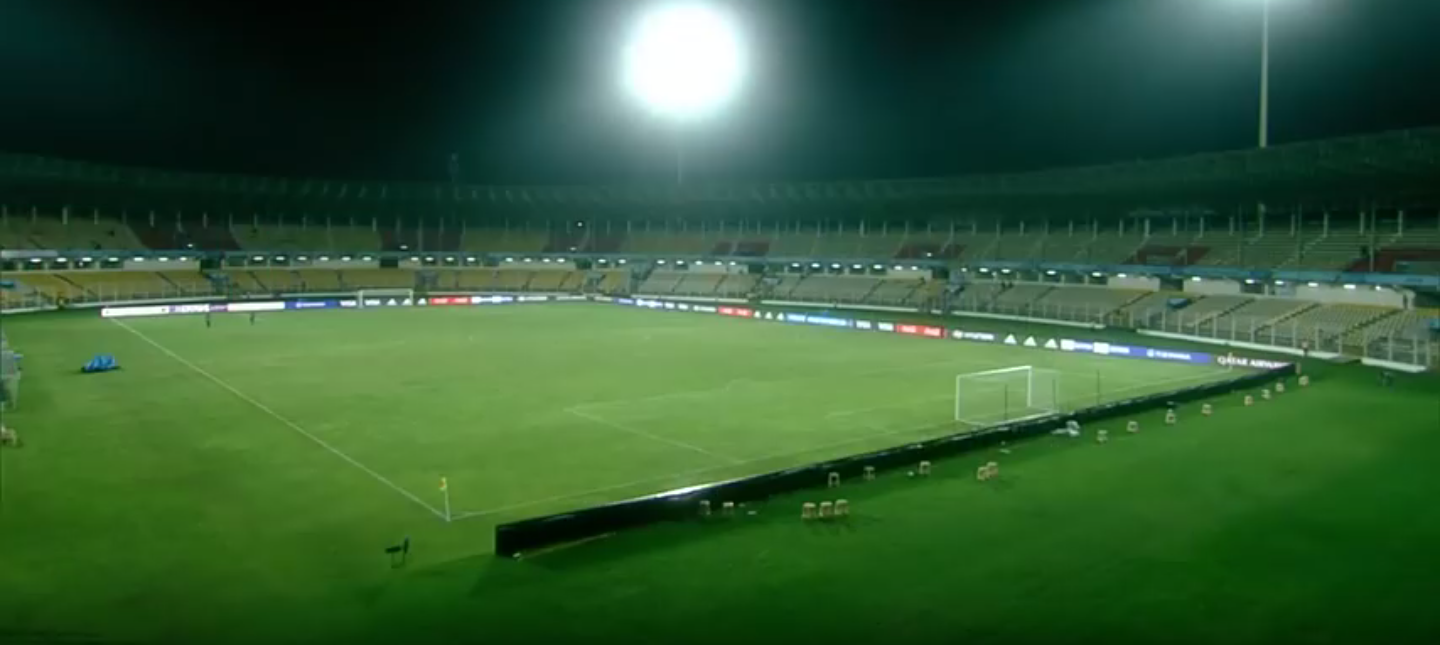
Fatorda Stadium, the home of FC Goa since 2014

The Pandit Jawaharlal Nehru Stadium in Margao, better known as The Fatorda is the home stadium of Goa. The stadium has hosted many international games, including India national team's qualifiers for both the FIFA World Cup and AFC Asian Cup. It was also one of the six host venues for the 2017 FIFA U-17 World Cup held in India.

The stadium opened in 1989. In 2014, it has been refurbished and upgraded according to the latest FIFA specifications to host the Lusofonia Games in 2014. It is designed with a 20,000 seating capacity. With a roof covering 100 percent of the seating area, the stadium complex provides two levels of fans seating arrangement along with a VIP area.

== Supporters ==
Fans of FC Goa on a matchday at the Fatorda stadium in Margao.

Fans in the state spend the night outside the Nehru Stadium in Fatorda in the hope of grabbing a couple of tickets for FC Goa's home matches. Streets were painted blue, music was played and some people painted their car bonnets with the crest of the team, during the ISL. FC Goa Fan Club and East Lower Army are the officially recognized supporters clubs of FC Goa. FC Goa celebrity supporters include Anushka Sharma, Sonakshi Sinha, Zayed Khan, and Raveena Tandon.

== Club crest and kits ==
The official mascot, the first of its kind in the ISL, is named "Philly the Gaur". He's a Gaur, which happens to be the state animal. FC Goa were the first out of the 10 clubs to have a mascot. There are also two other unofficial mascots namely "Gaurreddo", introduced by FC Goa Fan Club in 2014, followed by "Gaurdinho" in 2015, launched by a general football group TFDO.

=== Colours ===
During the early years, the club wore an all blue kit with orange colour coming lightly on the sides. The all blue kit were used until 2017-18 season, when the club adopted the all orange kit.

=== Kit manufacturers and shirt sponsors ===
Period	Kit manufacturer	Main shirt sponsor	Back sponsor
2014–15	Adidas	Videocon d2h	Usha
2015–16	Adidas	FC Prime Markets	DSK Dream City
2016–17	Umbro	Deltin	Goa Tourism
2017–18	Piranha	Deltin	Kingfisher
2018–19	Sqad Gear	Xiaomi	Kingfisher
2019–20	T10 Sports	Adda52	Kingfisher
2020–21	SIX5SIX	Indinews	Paytm First Games
2021–22	Reyaur	1XNews	Punch
2022–23	T10 Sports	Parimatch News	Deltin
2023–24	SIX5SIX	Parimatch News	Deltin
2024–25	SIX5SIX	Wolf777 News	Kingfisher
2025–26	SIX5SIX	ISGL	Kingfisher
2026–27	Trak-Only		

=== Kit evolution ===
2014–16	2016–17	2017–18	2018–19	2019–20	2020–21

2021 ACL	2021–22	2022–23	2023–24	2024–25	2025–26

== FC Goa in the media ==
FC Goa TV is the dedicated official channel for FC Goa. The channel first launched on 10 October 2014 on Videocon D2H channel 100. FC Goa TV includes buildup to matches, post-match shows, exclusive interviews with players and staff besides an interactive section which gives fans the chance to get some answers from first team players.

FC Goa launched its magazine Forca Goa at Fatorda Stadium, on 1 November 2014. The magazine was unveiled by All India Football Federation President Praful Patel in the presence of brand ambassador of FC Goa Varun Dhawan, supporter Sonu Nigam and co-owners Venugopal Dhoot, Anirudh Dhoot, Dattaraj V. Salgaocar and Shrinivas V. Dempo.

== Ownership ==
The club is owned by Goan Football Club Pvt. Ltd. which used to consist of Dattaraj Salgaocar (37% stake) and Shrinivas Dempo (37% stake), S. Edifices LLP (15%) which in 2016 was bought by Jaydev Mody (65% stake), Venugopal Dhoot (23% stake) and Virat Kohli (12% stake).

=== Current owners ===
- Jaydev Mody is the Chairman of Delta Corp Limited, the company focused in gaming (casinos) and hospitality mainly in Goa.
- Ashish Kapadia, Managing Director of Delta Corp Limited, and member of the Board of Directors at Raymond Ltd.
- Virat Kohli, Indian national men's cricket team former captain, is also one of the co-owners.
- Akshay Tandon is an entrepreneur who took over FC Goa in August 2016 as the President and Co-Owner of the club. Since the took over, he has built a youth program, set up the Forca Goa Foundation addressing the challenges with grassroots football in the state of Goa and established a style of play.

=== Former owners ===
- Shrinivas Dempo served as the President of Dempo Sports Club Private Limited. The club was owned and sponsored by the Dempo group of companies. He has been named amongst the 50 most influential people in Indian sports in the annual Sports Illustrated Power list.
- Dattaraj Salgaocar is the Managing Director of VM Salgaocar Corporation. Salgaocar FC is owned and managed by VM Salgaocar and Company to give a platform to the Goan youth to showcase their talent to the country and to the world.
- Venugopal Dhoot is the Chairman of Videocon, and has been its Managing Director since 2005.
- S. Edifices LLP held 15% stake in the original consortium that was transferred for equity swap with Tandon Inc.

== Players ==
=== First-team squad ===
As of 5 September 2026

Note: Flags indicate national team as defined under FIFA eligibility rules; some limited exceptions apply. Players may hold more than one non-FIFA nationality.

No.	Pos.	Nation	Player
3	DF	IND	Sandesh Jhingan (Captain)
5	MF	ESP	Alex Vallejo
8	MF	IND	Tomba Singh Haobam
9	FW	ESP	Chiki
13	GK	IND	Lara Sharma
15	DF	ESP	Álex Zalaya
18	DF	IND	Jerry Lalrinzuala
19	FW	IND	Isak Vanlalruatfela
21	DF	IND	Udanta Singh
22	MF	IND	Prachit Gaonkar
23	MF	IND	Harsh Patre
26	FW	IND	Ishan Pandita
27	DF	IND	Aakash Sangwan

No.	Pos.	Nation	Player
28	MF	ARG	Franchu
29	DF	IND	Nim Dorjee Tamang
33	GK	IND	Lionel Rymmei
35	DF	IND	Ronney Willson Kharbudon
41	DF	IND	Sitroy Carvalho
44	FW	IND	Muhammed Nemil
45	GK	IND	Bob Jackson Raj
46	MF	IND	Vellington Fernandes
47	MF	IND	Malsawmtluanga Lalsangliana
48	DF	IND	Akash Singh Konsam
77	FW	IND	KC Malsawmsanga
—	DF	IND	Saveme Tariang
—	DF	IND	Rudra Ved Moola
—	FW	ESP	Jorge Ortiz

=== Out on loan ===
Note: Flags indicate national team as defined under FIFA eligibility rules; some limited exceptions apply. Players may hold more than one non-FIFA nationality.

No.	Pos.	Nation	Player

== Reserves and youth ==
=== Youth football ===
FC Goa has a reserve side which is fielded in the I-League 2nd Division. It also has a women's team which was announced on 28 July 2018. It also has youth teams for various age group football tournaments and Youth I-League.

=== Grassroots ===
FC Goa's grassroots development programme which commenced in February 2015, saw FC Goa reaching out to over 20,000 children. FC Goa has a robust grassroots development programme. Over 1500 children between the age groups of 6 to 14 are currently being groomed by FC Goa. The U-14 team, the Junior Gaurs are doing excellently well. FC Goa assigned coach Gavin Araujo, an AFC A license coach as its Head of the youth development and Katz Naidoo as the program's Technical Director. The adopted 16 schools include St Anthony's High School (Duler), St Anthony's HS (Guirim), Saraswat HS (Mapusa), St Britto's HS (Mapusa), Assagao Union School, St Joseph's HS (Calangute), Pilar Central School, and St Lawrence HS (Agassaim) in the North. Our Lady of Poor HS (Tilamol), Our Lady of Fatima HS (Rivona), St Joseph HS (Chandor), Assumpta HS (Sarzora), Fr Agnel Ashram HS (Verna), St Rita HS (Maina), St Rock HS (Velim), and St Xavier HS (Velim) are the schools which have been adopted by FC Goa from the South.

=== Reserves Squad ===
As of 25 January 2021

Note: Flags indicate national team as defined under FIFA eligibility rules; some limited exceptions apply. Players may hold more than one non-FIFA nationality.

No.	Pos.	Nation	Player
2	DF	IND	Deeshank Kunkalikar
3	MF	IND	Versly Paes
5	DF	IND	Rayan Menezes
9	FW	IND	Aaren D'Silva
14	MF	IND	Kapil Hoble
17	MF	IND	Delton Colaco
21	DF	IND	Brian Faria
22	FW	IND	Vasim Inamdar
24	MF	IND	Ivon Costa
25	MF	IND	Manushawn Joel Fernandes
26	MF	IND	Kunal Kundaikar

No.	Pos.	Nation	Player
29	DF	IND	Lesly Rebello
31	GK	IND	Hansel Coelho
40	DF	IND	Alister Fernandes
42	MF	IND	Brison Fernandes
43	DF	IND	Malsawmtluanga Ralte
46	FW	IND	Joybert Almeida
47	FW	IND	Omkar Landge
51	GK	IND	Viddhesh Bhonsle
55	GK	IND	Hrithik Tiwari
—	DF	IND	Lalhmangaih Sanga
—	DF	IND	Rollin Fernandes

== Personnel ==
=== Current technical staff ===
Role	Name	Refs.
Head coach	(Spain) Ángel Viadero	
Assistant coach	(India) Shameel Chembakath	
Goalkeeping coach	(India) Sugitesh Mandrekar	
Strength & conditioning coach	(India) Chelston Pinto	
Head of performance analysis	(India) Joy Gabriel M.	

=== Management ===
Position	Name
CEO	(India) Ravi Puskur
Head of technical operations	(India) Jonathan D'Souza
Technical director	(India) Derrick Pereira
Team manager	(India) Dion Pinto

== Records and statistics ==
=== Notable wins against foreign teams ===
As of matches played 13 August 2025

Competition	Round	Year	Opposition	Score	Venue	City	Ref
Pre-season friendly	Exhibition	2015	(United Arab Emirates) Al Shabab Al Arabi	2–1	Maktoum bin Rashid Al Maktoum Stadium	Dubai	
Pre-season friendly	Exhibition	2016	(Brazil) CR Flamengo	1–0	Centro de Treinamento George Helal	Rio de Janeiro	
Pre-season friendly	Exhibition	2017	(Spain) Deportiva Minera	3–0	La Manga Club Football Stadium	Murcia	
Pre-season friendly	Exhibition	2017	(Spain) Deportivo Algar	3–1	La Manga Club Football Stadium	Murcia	
Pre-season friendly	Exhibition	2017	(Spain) Cartagena B	4–2	La Manga Club Football Stadium	Murcia	
Pre-season friendly	Exhibition	2018	(Spain) Deportiva Minera	3–0	La Manga Club Football Stadium	Murcia	
Pre-season friendly	Exhibition	2018	(Spain) Cartagena B	20–0	La Manga Club Football Stadium	Murcia	
Pre-season friendly	Exhibition	2018	(Spain) Cartagena	3–2	La Manga Club Football Stadium	Murcia	
Pre-season friendly	Exhibition	2018	(Spain) Racing Mar Menor	2–1	La Manga Club Football Stadium	Murcia	
Durand Cup	Group stage	2024	(Nepal) Tribhuvan Army	2–1	Jawaharlal Nehru Stadium	Shillong	
Bandodkar Trophy	Group stage	2024	(Australia) Brisbane Roar	1–0	Fatorda Stadium	Margao	
Bandodkar Trophy	Semi-final	2024	(Argentina) Defensa y Justicia	1–0	Fatorda Stadium	Margao	
AFC Champions League Two	Qualifying play-off	2025	(Oman) Al-Seeb	2–1	Fatorda Stadium	Margao	

== Continental record ==
Season	Competition	Round	Club	Home	Away	Position	Source
2021	AFC Champions League	Group E	(Qatar) Al Rayyan	0–0	1–1	3rd	
2021	AFC Champions League	Group E	(United Arab Emirates) Al Wahda	0–2	0–0	3rd	
2021	AFC Champions League	Group E	(Iran) Persepolis	0–4	1–2	3rd	
2025–26	AFC Champions League Two	Play-off round	(Oman) Al-Seeb	2–1	—N/a	—N/a	
2025–26	AFC Champions League Two	Group D	(Saudi Arabia) Al Nassr	1–2	0–4	4th	
2025–26	AFC Champions League Two	Group D	(Iraq) Al-Zawraa	0–2	1–2	4th	
2025–26	AFC Champions League Two	Group D	(Tajikistan) Istiklol	1–2	0–2	4th	

=== Statistics by AFC competitions ===
Competition	Apps	Pld	W	L	D	GF	GA	GD	Win%
Champions League	1	6	0	3	3	2	9	–7	0%
Champions League Two	1	6	0	6	0	3	14	–11	0%
Total	2	12	0	9	3	5	23	–18	0%

== Affiliated clubs ==
The following club is currently affiliated with FC Goa:

- (Germany) RB Leipzig (2020–present)

The following clubs were affiliated with FC Goa:

- (India) Dempo SC (2014–2016)
- (India) Salgaocar FC (2014–2016)

== Honours ==
=== Domestic ===
==== League ====
- Indian Super League
  - League Shield Winners (1): 2019–20
  - Runners-up (2): 2015, 2018–19

==== Cup ====
- Super Cup
  - Winners (3): 2019, 2025, 2025–26
- Durand Cup
  - Winners (1): 2021

=== Regional ===
- Bandodkar Trophy
  - Winners (1): 2024

== AFC club ranking ==
As of 12 June 2022

Rank	Team	Points
255	(India) Rajasthan United	1,252
256	(India) ONGC	1,251
257	(India) Goa	1,251
258	(Indonesia) Persikabo 1973	1,251
259	(Jordan) Shabab Al-Aqaba Club	1,250

== eSports ==
The organizers of ISL introduced eISL, a FIFA video game tournament, for the ISL playing clubs, each represented by two players. FC Goa hosted a series of qualifying games for all the participants wanting to represent the club in eISL. On 20 November the club announced the signing of the two players.

=== Roster ===
FCGoa eSports FIFA roster
Players
Coaches

Handle	Name	Nationality
V--Sharma10	Sharma, Vanshaj	India
Afnanameen10	Khan, Afnan Ameen	India

Head coach

Stuart Curwen @stucurwen (2023 season)

Legend:
- (I) Inactive
- (S) Suspended
- Substitute
- (injured) Injury / Illness

Latest roster transaction: 19 November 2021.

== See also ==
- List of FC Goa records and statistics
- List of FC Goa players
- List of FC Goa seasons
- Indian football clubs in Asian competitions
