= 2020–21 Mumbai City FC season =

2020–21 football season for Mumbai City Football Club

Mumbai City
2020–21 season
- Head coach: Sergio Lobera
- Stadium: GMC Athletic Stadium (Note: Due to the ongoing COVID-19 pandemic in India, all Indian Super League matches during the 2020–21 season will be held in Goa. Mumbai City matches will be hosted at the GMC Athletic Stadium in Bambolim.)
- Indian Super League: 1st (Premiers)
- Play-offs: Champions
- Top goalscorer: League: Adam Le Fondre (11); All: Adam Le Fondre (11)
Home colours	Away colours

The 2020–21 Mumbai City FC season was the seventh season in the history of Indian Super League club Mumbai City. After failing to qualify for the playoffs the previous season, head coach Jorge Costa was relieved of his duties and replaced by Goa head coach Sergio Lobera.

== Senior squad ==
As of 1 November 2020

Note: Flags indicate national team as defined under FIFA eligibility rules; some limited exceptions apply. Players may hold more than one non-FIFA nationality.

No.	Pos.	Nation	Player
1	GK	IND	Amrinder Singh (Captain)
2	DF	IND	Mohammad Rakip
3	DF	IND	Tondonba Singh
4	DF	IND	Amey Ranawade
5	MF	MAR	Ahmed Jahouh
6	MF	ESP	Hernán Santana (on loan from Sporting Gijón)
7	MF	FRA	Hugo Boumous
8	MF	IND	Sourav Das
9	FW	ENG	Adam Le Fondre (on loan from Sydney FC)
10	FW	NGR	Bartholomew Ogbeche
11	MF	IND	Raynier Fernandes
12	MF	IND	Bidyananda Singh
14	MF	IND	Rowllin Borges
15	DF	IND	Mehtab Singh

No.	Pos.	Nation	Player
16	DF	IND	Sarthak Golui
17	DF	IND	Mandar Rao Dessai
19	FW	IND	Pranjal Bhumij
21	MF	JPN	Cy Goddard (on loan from Benevento Calcio)
22	FW	IND	Vikram Pratap Singh
23	MF	IND	Vignesh Dakshinamurthy
24	GK	IND	Vikram Lakhbir Singh
25	DF	SEN	Mourtada Fall
27	FW	IND	Jackichand Singh
29	FW	IND	Bipin Singh
30	GK	IND	Nishit Shetty
31	DF	IND	Valpuia
34	GK	IND	Phurba Lachenpa
39	MF	IND	Mohammed Asif Khan

=== Out on loan ===
Note: Flags indicate national team as defined under FIFA eligibility rules; some limited exceptions apply. Players may hold more than one non-FIFA nationality.

No.	Pos.	Nation	Player
—	FW	IND	Ayush Chhikara (at (India) Sudeva Delhi until 31 May 2021)
—	MF	IND	Naorem Tondomba Singh (at (India) Sudeva Delhi until 31 May 2021)
—	MF	IND	Chanso Horam (at (India) TRAU FC until 31 May 2021)
—	MF	IND	PC Rohlupuia (at (India) Mumbai City FC Reserves and Academy)

== Squad changes ==
=== In ===
No.	Position	Player	Previous club	Type/fee	Date	Ref
—	MF	(Japan) Cy Goddard	(Italy) Benevento	Loan	3 October 2020	

=== Out ===
Position	Player	New club	Type/fee	Date	Ref
DF	(Croatia) Mato Grgić	(Croatia) Rudeš	Released	1 June 2020	
DF	(India) Pratik Chaudhari	Bengaluru	Free transfer	3 June 2020	
GK	(India) Ravi Kumar	Odisha	Free transfer	3 June 2020	
MF	(Portugal) Paulo Machado	(Portugal) Leixões	Free transfer	7 August 2020	
DF	(India) Subhasish Bose	ATK Mohun Bagan	Free transfer	13 August 2020	

== Competitions ==
=== Pre-season and friendlies ===
30 October 2020 Friendly	(India) Kerala Blasters FC	0–0	(India) Mumbai City	Goa, India
14:00 IST				Stadium: GMC Stadium, Bambolim; Attendance: Closed Doors

2 November 2020 Friendly	(India) Chennaiyin FC	0–1	(India) Mumbai City FC	Goa, India
16:00 IST		Report	Le Fondre 21'

10 November 2020 Friendly	Mumbai City (India)	3–2	(India) Odisha	Nagoa, Goa, India
	Ogbeche; Borges; Antonay (o.g.)		Marcelinho; Nandha	Stadium: Village Panchayat Ground,

13 November 2020 Friendly	Bengaluru	0–1	Mumbai	Nagoa, Goa
			Boumous	Stadium: Nagoa ground

=== Overview ===
Competition	First match	Last match	Starting round	Record							
Competition	First match	Last match	Starting round	Pld	W	D	L	GF	GA	GD	Win %
ISL	21 November 2020		Matchday 1	22	12	6	4	39	21	+18	54.55
Super Cup								—			
Total				22	12	6	4	39	21	+18	54.55

Last updated: 24 February 2021
Source: FBref

=== Indian Super League ===
==== League table ====
Pos	Team	Pld	W	D	L	GF	GA	GD	Pts	Qualification
1	Mumbai City (L, C)	20	12	4	4	35	18	+17	40	Qualification to ISL playoffs and 2022 AFC Champions League group stage
2	ATK Mohun Bagan (Note: As the Premiers Mumbai City won the ISL playoffs, the regular season runners-up qualified for 2022 AFC Cup play-off round.)	20	12	4	4	28	15	+13	40	Qualification to ISL playoffs and 2022 AFC Cup play-off round
3	NorthEast United	20	8	9	3	31	25	+6	33	Qualification to ISL playoffs
4	Goa	20	7	10	3	31	23	+8	31	Qualification to ISL playoffs
5	Hyderabad	20	6	11	3	27	19	+8	29	

Source: Indian Super League
Rules for classification: 1) points; 2) head-to-head points; 3) head-to-head goal difference; 4) head-to-head goals scored; 5) goal difference; 6) number of goals scored; 7) fair play ranking; 8) drawing of lots
(C) Champions; (L) League Winners' Shield Winners

==== Results by matchday ====
Matchday	1	2	3	4	5	6	7	8	9	10	11	12	13	14	15	16	17	18	19	20
Ground	A	A	H	H	H	H	A	H	A	A	H	A	A	H	A	H	H	A	A	H
Result	L	W	W	W	W	D	W	W	W	W	D	W	D	L	W	D	L	L	W	W
Position	10	5	4	1	1	1	1	1	1	1	1	1	1	1	1	1	2	2	2	1

Updated to match(es) played on 28 February 2021. Source: ISL
A = Away; H = Home; W = Win; D = Draw; L = Loss

==== Matches ====
21 November 2020 1	NorthEast	1–0	Mumbai City	Vasco da Gama, Goa (Note: Due to the COVID-19 pandemic in India, the 2020–21 Indian Super League season would be entirely held in Goa, inside closed doors and Kerala Blasters has been allotted the GMC Athletic Stadium as their home ground for the season.)
19:30 IST (UTC+05:30)	Appiah 49' (pen.); Mehta (yellow card) 84'; Gallego (yellow card) 90'	Report	Golui (yellow card) 37'; Jahouh (red card) 43'; Cy (yellow card) 90'	Stadium: Tilak Maidan Stadium; Attendance: 0 Referee: R Venkatesh; Man of the Match: Khassa Camara (NorthEast United)

25 November 2020 2	Goa	0–1	Mumbai City	Margao, Goa
19:00 IST (UTC+05:30)	Seriton (yellow card) 30'; Tlang (red card) 40'; Romario (yellow card) 73'; Edu Bedia (yellow card) 90'	Report	Sarthak (yellow card) 24'; Mandar (yellow card) 34'; Ranawade (yellow card) 65'; Le Fondre 90+5' (pen.)	Stadium: Fatorda Stadium; Attendance: 0 Referee: Rahul Kumar Gupta; Man of the Match: Le Fondre (Mumbai City)

1 December 2020 3	Mumbai City	3–0	East Bengal	Bambolim, Goa
19:30 IST	Rakip (yellow card) 10'; Le Fondre 20', 48' (pen.); Borges (yellow card) 36'; Fall (yellow card) 44'; Jahouh (yellow card) 53'; Santana 58'; Rao Dessai (yellow card) 62'	Report	Angousana (yellow card) 58'; Rafique (yellow card) 90'	Stadium: GMC Athletic Stadium; Attendance: 0 Referee: Tejas Nagvenkar; Man of the Match: Hugo Boumous (Mumbai City)

6 December 2020 4	Mumbai City	2–0	Odisha	Bambolim, Goa
18:30 IST	Ogbeche 30' (pen.); Borges 45'; Dakshinamurthy (yellow card) 66'; Le Fondre (yellow card) 86'	Report	Tratt (yellow card) 69'; Meher (yellow card) 75'; Taylor (yellow card) 90'	Stadium: GMC Athletic Stadium; Attendance: 0 Referee: Ranjit Baksi; Man of the Match: Borges (Mumbai City)

9 December 2020 5	Mumbai City	2–1	Chennaiyin	Bambolim, Goa
19:30 IST	Santana 45+2'; Dakshinamurthy (yellow card) 63'; M. Singh (yellow card) 66'; Le Fondre 75'; Boumous (yellow card) 88'	Report	Sylvestr 40'; G. Singh (yellow card) 42'; Sabiá (yellow card) 44'; R. Singh (yellow card) 46'; Crivellaro (yellow card) 88'	Stadium: GMC Athletic Stadium; Attendance: 0 Referee: L Ajitkumar Meitei; Man of the Match: Fall (Mumbai City)

14 December 2020 6	Mumbai City	1–1	Jamshedpur	Bambolim, Goa
19:30 IST	Ogbeche 16'; Ranawade (yellow card) 87'	Report	Valskis 9'; Monroy (yellow card) 14' (yellow-red card) 28'	Stadium: GMC Athletic Stadium; Attendance: 0 Referee: C.R. Srikrishna; Man of the Match: Hartely (Jamshedpur)

20 December 2020 7	Hyderabad	0–2	Mumbai City	Vasco, Goa
19:30 IST (UTC+05:30)	Santana (yellow card) 18'; Colaco (yellow card) 84'	Report	Dakshinamurthy 38' (yellow card) 69'; Le Fondre 52'; A. Singh (yellow card) 84'; Borges (yellow card) 90+1'	Stadium: Tilak Maidan Stadium; Attendance: 0 Referee: L Ajitkumar Meitei; Man of the Match: Jahouh (Mumbai City)

2 January 2021 8	Mumbai City	2–0	Kerala Blasters	Bambolim, Goa
19:30 IST	Le Fondre 3' (pen.); Hugo Boumous 11'; Amrinder Singh (yellow card) 24'; Hugo Boumous (yellow card) 68'; Hernán Santana (yellow card) 85'	Report	Gómez (yellow card) 39'; Sandeep (yellow card) 70'	Stadium: GMC Athletic Stadium; Attendance: 0 Referee: Rahul Kumar Gupta; Man of the Match: Amrinder Singh (Mumbai City)

5 January 2021 9	Bengaluru	1–3	Mumbai City	Margao, Goa
19:30 IST	Chhetri (yellow card) 61' (goal) 79' (pen.); Khabra (yellow card) 81'	Report	Fall 9'; Bipin 15'; Jahouh (yellow card) 40' (yellow-red card) 86'; Ranawade (yellow card) 58'; Ogbeche 85'	Stadium: Fatorda Stadium; Attendance: 0 Referee: Coimbatore Ramaswamy Srikrishna

11 January 2021 10	ATK Mohun Bagan	0–1	Mumbai City	Margao, Goa
19:30 IST	Halder (yellow card) 47'; Hernández (yellow card) 61'; Bose (yellow card) 90'	Report	Dessai (yellow card) 49'; Ogbeche 69'; Santana (yellow card) 90'	Stadium: Fatorda Stadium; Attendance: 0 Referee: Coimbatore Ramaswamy Srikrishna

16 January 2021 11	Mumbai City	0–0	Hyderabad	Bambolim, Goa
19:30 IST	Santana (yellow card) 69'; Pratap (yellow card) 83'; Le Fondre (yellow card) 85'	Report	Singh (yellow card) 35'	Stadium: GMC Athletic Stadium; Attendance: 0 Referee: A Rowan

22 January 2021 12	East Bengal	0–1	Mumbai City	Vasco da Gama, Goa
19:30 IST	Fox (yellow card) 5'	Report	Jahouh (yellow card) 23'; Fall 27'; Boumous (yellow card) 73'; Dessai (yellow card) 75'; Ogbeche (yellow card) 86'	Stadium: Tilak Maidan Stadium; Attendance: 0 Referee: Coimbatore Ramaswamy Srikrishna

25 January 2021 13	Chennaiyin	1–1	Mumbai City	Bambolim, Goa
19:30 IST	Sipović (yellow card) 10'; Gonçalves 76' (pen.)	Report	D: Ogbeche 21'; Jahouh (yellow card) 75'; Borges (yellow card) 90'	Stadium: GMC Athletic Stadium; Attendance: 0 Referee: Mb Santhosh Kumar

30 January 2021 14	Mumbai City	1–2	NorthEast United	Bambolim, Goa
19:30 IST	Ogbeche (yellow card) 51'; Jahouh (yellow card) 55'; Golui (yellow card) 73'; Le Fondre 85'	Report	Brown 6', 9'; Lakra (yellow card) 48'; Tamang (yellow card) 71'; Machado (yellow card) 90'	Stadium: GMC Athletic Stadium; Attendance: 0 Referee: Tejas Nagvenkar

3 February 2021 15	Kerala Blasters	1–2	Mumbai City	Bambolim, Goa
19:30 IST	Gómez 27'; Nhamoinesu (yellow card) 45'; Juande (yellow card) 69'	Report	Fall (yellow card) 45'; Bipin 46'; Le Fondre 67' (pen.); Dessai (yellow card) 88'	Stadium: GMC Athletic Stadium; Attendance: 0 Referee: Rahul Kumar Gupta

8 February 2021 16	Mumbai City	3–3	Goa	Bambolim, Goa
19:30 IST	Boumous 20' (yellow card) 90' (red card) 90'; Le Fondre 26' (yellow card) 79'; Fall (yellow card) 59'	Report	Martins (yellow card) 8' (goal) 45'; Khan (yellow card) 36'; Angulo 51'; S. Fernandes (yellow card) 57'; Pandita 90'	Stadium: GMC Athletic Stadium; Attendance: 0 Referee: Pranjal Banerjee

15 February 2021 17	Mumbai City	2–4	Bengaluru	Bambolim, Goa
19:30 IST	Bipin 45'; Le Fondre 50', 72'	Report	Silva 1', 22'; Shrivas (yellow card) 15'; González (yellow card) 29'; Khabra (yellow card) 42'; Chhetri (yellow card) 52' (goal) 57', 90'; Kuruniyan (yellow card) 78'; Lalrindika (yellow card) 83'; Sandhu (yellow card) 87'	Stadium: GMC Athletic Stadium; Attendance: 0 Referee: Rahul Kumar Gupta

20 February 2021 18	Jamshedpur	2–0	Mumbai City	Vasco, Goa
19:30 IST	Valskis (yellow card) 66'; Thangjam 72'; Grande 90'	Report	Goddard (yellow card) 79'	Stadium: Tilak Maidan Stadium; Attendance: 0 Referee: Harish Kundu

24 February 2021 19	Odisha	1–6	Mumbai City	Bambolim, Goa
19:30 IST	Diego Maurício 9' (pen.)	Report	Ogbeche 14', 43'; Bipin 38', 47', 86'; Goddard 44'	Stadium: GMC Athletic Stadium; Attendance: 0 Referee: Tejas Nagvenkar; Man of the Match: Bipin Singh (ATK)

28 February 2021 20	Mumbai City	2–0	ATK Mohun Bagan	Bambolim, Goa
19:30 IST	Fall 7'; Fernandes (yellow card) 14'; Ranawade (yellow card) 26'; Ogbeche 39'; Santana (yellow card) 74'; Pratap (yellow card) 79'	Report	Kotal (yellow card) 37'; Halder (yellow card) 77'	Stadium: GMC Athletic Stadium; Attendance: 0 Referee: Tejas Nagvenkar; Man of the Match: Mourtada Fall (MCFC)

==== Play-offs ====
5 March 2021 Semi-finals 1st leg	Goa	2–2	Mumbai City	Margao
19:30 IST	Angulo 20' (pen.); Saviour 59'	Report	Boumous 38'; Fall 61'	Stadium: Fatorda Stadium; Attendance: 0 Referee: Pranjal Banerjee (India)

8 March 2021 Semi-finals 2nd leg	Mumbai City	0–0 (a.e.t.) (2–2 agg.) (6–5 p)	Goa	Bambolim
19:30 IST		Report		Stadium: GMC Stadium; Attendance: 0 Referee: Ajit Kumar Meitei (India)
	Penalties
	Ogbeche (penalty scored); Hernán (penalty missed); Boumous (penalty missed); Raynier (penalty scored); Jahouh (penalty missed); Ranawade (penalty scored); Fall (penalty scored); Mandar (penalty scored); Borges (penalty scored)		Bedia (penalty missed); Brandon (penalty missed); Angulo (penalty scored); Iván (penalty scored); Donachie (penalty missed); Pandita (penalty scored); Ortiz (penalty scored); Adil (penalty scored); Glan (penalty missed)

13 March 2021 Final	Mumbai City	2–1	ATK Mohun Bagan	Margao
19:30 IST	Tiri 29' (o.g.); Singh 90'	Report	Williams 18'	Stadium: Fatorda Stadium; Attendance: 0 (Note: Match was played behind closed doors due to government restrictions regarding the COVID-19 pandemic in India.); Referee: Tejas Nagavenkar

== Statistics ==
=== Goal scorers ===
Rank	No.	Pos.	Player	Indian Super League	Play-offs	Total
1	9	FW	(England) Adam Le Fondre	11	0	11
2	10	FW	(Nigeria) Bartholomew Ogbeche	8	0	8
3	29	MF	(India) Bipin Singh	5	1	6
4	25	DF	(Senegal) Mourtada Fall	3	1	4
5	7	MF	(France) Hugo Boumous	2	1	3
6	6	MF	(Spain) Hernán Santana	2	0	2
6	14	MF	(India) Rowllin Borges	2	0	2
8	23	MF	(India) Vignesh Dakshinamurthy	1	0	1
8	21	MF	(Japan) Cy Goddard	1	0	1
Own goals				0	1	1
Total				35	4	39

Last updated: 13 March 2021.
Source: FBref

=== Clean sheets ===
Rank	No.	Pos.	Player	Indian Super League	Play-offs	Total
1	1	GK	(India) Amrinder Singh	9	1	10
Total				9	1	10

Last updated: 8 March 2021.
Source: FBref
