= 2021 Indian Super League playoffs =

Tournament details
- Country: India
- Teams: 4

Final positions
- Champions: Mumbai City
- Runners-up: ATK Mohun Bagan
- Semifinalists: NorthEast United; Goa

Tournament statistics
- Matches played: 5
- Goals scored: 12 (2.4 per match)

The 2021 Indian Super League playoffs was seventh playoffs series in the Indian Super League, one of the top Indian professional football leagues. The playoffs began on 5 March 2021 and concluded with the final on 13 March 2021 in Goa.

The top four teams from the 2020–21 ISL regular season had qualified for the playoffs. The semi-finals took place over two legs while the final was a one-off match at the Fatorda Stadium in Margao, Goa

== Season table ==
Pos	Team	Pld	W	D	L	GF	GA	GD	Pts	Qualification
1	Mumbai City (L, C)	20	12	4	4	35	18	+17	40	Qualification to ISL playoffs and 2022 AFC Champions League group stage
2	ATK Mohun Bagan (Note: As the Premiers Mumbai City won the ISL playoffs, the regular season runners-up qualified for 2022 AFC Cup play-off round.)	20	12	4	4	28	15	+13	40	Qualification to ISL playoffs and 2022 AFC Cup play-off round
3	NorthEast United	20	8	9	3	31	25	+6	33	Qualification to ISL playoffs
4	Goa	20	7	10	3	31	23	+8	31	Qualification to ISL playoffs
5	Hyderabad	20	6	11	3	27	19	+8	29	
6	Jamshedpur	20	7	6	7	21	22	−1	27	
7	Bengaluru	20	5	7	8	26	28	−2	22	
8	Chennaiyin	20	3	11	6	17	23	−6	20	
9	East Bengal	20	3	8	9	22	33	−11	17	
10	Kerala Blasters	20	3	8	9	23	36	−13	17	
11	Odisha	20	2	6	12	25	44	−19	12	

Source: Indian Super League
Rules for classification: 1) points; 2) head-to-head points; 3) head-to-head goal difference; 4) head-to-head goals scored; 5) goal difference; 6) number of goals scored; 7) fair play ranking; 8) drawing of lots
(C) Champions; (L) League Winners' Shield Winners

== Teams ==
- Mumbai City
- ATK Mohun Bagan
- Northeast United
- Goa

== Bracket ==
Semi-finals
1	Mumbai City (p)	2	0	2 (6)
4	Goa	2	0	2 (5)
2	ATK Mohun Bagan	1	2	3
3	NorthEast United	1	1	2

Final
1	Mumbai City	2
2	ATK Mohun Bagan	1

=== Semi-finals ===
Team 1	Agg.	Team 2	1st leg	2nd leg
Mumbai City	2–2 (6–5 p)	Goa	2–2	0–0 (a.e.t.)
ATK Mohun Bagan	3–2	NorthEast United	1–1	2–1

== Semi-finals ==
5 March 2021
19:30 IST

Goa	2–2	Mumbai City
Angulo 20' (pen.); Saviour 59'	Report	Boumous 38'; Fall 61'

Fatorda Stadium, Margao
Attendance: 0
Referee: Pranjal Banerjee (India)
8 March 2021
19:30 IST

Mumbai City	0–0 (a.e.t.)	Goa
	Report
Penalties
Ogbeche (penalty scored); Hernán (penalty missed); Boumous (penalty missed); Raynier (penalty scored); Jahouh (penalty missed); Ranawade (penalty scored); Fall (penalty scored); Mandar (penalty scored); Borges (penalty scored)	6–5	Bedia (penalty missed); Brandon (penalty missed); Angulo (penalty scored); Iván (penalty scored); Donachie (penalty missed); Pandita (penalty scored); Ortiz (penalty scored); Adil (penalty scored); Glan (penalty missed)

GMC Stadium, Bambolim
Attendance: 0
Referee: Ajit Kumar Meitei (India)

2–2 on aggregate. Mumbai City won 6–5 on penalties.

6 March 2021
19:30 IST

NorthEast United	1–1	ATK Mohun Bagan
Sylla 90+4'	Report	Williams 34'

GMC Stadium, Bambolim
Attendance: 0
Referee: Crystal John (India)
9 March 2021
19:30 IST

ATK Mohun Bagan	2–1	Northeast United
Williams 38'; Manvir 68'	Report	V.P. Suhair 74'

Fatorda Stadium, Margao
Attendance: 0
Referee: Rahul Kumar Gupta (India)

ATK Mohun Bagan won 3–2 on aggregate.

== Final ==
13 March 2021
19:30 IST

Mumbai City	2–1	ATK Mohun Bagan
Tiri 29' (o.g.); B. Singh 90'	Report	Williams 18'

Fatorda Stadium, Margao
Attendance: 0
Referee: Tejas Nagvenkar (India)
