= List of 2023–24 Indian Super League transfers =

Indian football transfer window

This is a list of Indian football transfers for the 2023–24 Indian Super League. The list includes both pre-season and mid-season transfers.

Clubs were able to sign players at any time, but they could only be registered in transfer windows running from 9 June to 31 August 2023, and from 1 January to 31 January 2024.

== Pre-season ==
All players and clubs without a flag are Indian.

Date	Player	Moving from	Moving to	Ref
16 May 2023	(Australia) Jaushua Sotirio	(Australia) Newcastle Jets	Kerala Blasters	
31 May 2023	(Morocco) Ahmed Jahouh	Mumbai City	Odisha	
1 June 2023	Prabir Das	Bengaluru	Kerala Blasters	
5 June 2023	(Senegal) Mourtada Fall	Mumbai City	Odisha	
10 June 2023	Nandhakumar Sekar	Odisha	East Bengal	
11 June 2023	Rowllin Borges	Mumbai City	Goa (loan)	
12 June 2023	(Spain) Borja Herrera	Hyderabad	East Bengal	
14 June 2023	Udanta Singh Kumam	Bengaluru	Goa	
14 June 2023	Halicharan Narzary	Hyderabad	Bengaluru	
14 June 2023	Nishu Kumar	Kerala Blasters	East Bengal (loan)	
14 June 2023	Udanta Singh Kumam	Bengaluru	Goa	
17 June 2023	(Spain) Javier Siverio	Hyderabad	East Bengal	
18 June 2023	(Spain) Saúl Crespo	Odisha	East Bengal	
18 June 2023	(Spain) Pedro Martín	Odisha	(Switzerland) Schaffhausen	
19 June 2023	Edwin Sydney Vanspaul	Chennaiyin	East Bengal	
19 June 2023	Harmanjot Singh Khabra	Kerala Blasters	East Bengal	
19 June 2023	Mandar Rao Dessai	Mumbai City	East Bengal	
19 June 2023	Akash Mishra	Hyderabad	Mumbai City	
20 June 2023	Sandesh Jhingan	Bengaluru	Goa	
21 June 2023	(Ghana) Kwame Karikari	Chennaiyin	(Thailand) Police Tero	
21 June 2023	(Iran) Vafa Hakhamaneshi	Chennaiyin	(Malaysia) Negeri Sembilan	
21 June 2023	Vikram Lahkbir Singh	Aizawl	Bengaluru	
21 June 2023	Laldinliana Renthlei	Jamshedpur	Odisha	
23 June 2023	Anirudh Thapa	Chennaiyin	Mohun Bagan SG	
23 June 2023	Boris Singh Thangjam	Jamshedpur	Goa	
24 June 2023	Vinit Rai	Odisha	Mumbai City	
25 June 2023	(Albania) Armando Sadiku	(Spain) Cartagena	Mohun Bagan SG	
26 June 2023	Sagolsem Bikash Singh	TRAU	Kerala Blasters	
26 June 2023	Lenny Rodrigues	Goa	Odisha	
27 June 2023	Amey Ranawade	Mumbai City	Odisha (loan)	
28 June 2023	Raynier Fernandes	Mumbai City	Goa	
28 June 2023	(Montenegro) Slavko Damjanović	Mohun Bagan SG	Bengaluru	
28 June 2023	(Australia) Jason Cummings	(Australia) Central Coast Mariners	Mohun Bagan SG	
1 July 2023	(Australia) Paulo Retre	(Australia) Sydney FC	Goa	
2 July 2023	Ankit Mukherjee	East Bengal	Chennaiyin	
2 July 2023	Bijay Chhetri	Sreenidi Deccan	Chennaiyin	
3 July 2023	Konsam Phalguni Singh	Sreenidi Deccan	NorthEast United	
6 July 2023	Prateek Kumar Singh	Real Kashmir	Chennaiyin	
6 July 2023	Sachu Siby	Kerala United	Chennaiyin	
7 July 2023	Rohit Danu	Hyderabad	Bengaluru	
7 July 2023	(Spain) Carlos Martínez	(Spain) Andorra	Goa	
7 July 2023	(Brazil) Ibson Melo	(Thailand) Khon Kaen United	NorthEast United	
9 July 2023	Anwar Ali	Delhi	Mohun Bagan SG (loan)	
10 July 2023	Salam Johnson Singh	TRAU	Bengaluru	
10 July 2023	Vignesh Dakshinamurthy	Mumbai City	Hyderabad	
11 July 2023	Farukh Choudhary	Jamshedpur	Chennaiyin	
12 July 2023	(Spain) Odei Onaindia	Hyderabad	Goa	
12 July 2023	(Costa Rica) Jonathan Moya	(South Korea) Anyang	Hyderabad	
12 July 2023	Prabhsukhan Singh Gill	East Bengal	Kerala Blasters	
12 July 2023	(Netherlands) Yoell van Nieff	(Hungary) Puskás Akadémia	Mumbai City	
13 July 2023	(Australia) Jordan Murray	(Thailand) Nakhon Ratchasima	Chennaiyin	
13 July 2023	Naocha Singh	Mumbai City	Kerala Blasters (loan)	
14 July 2023	Pritam Kotal	Mohun Bagan SG	Kerala Blasters	
14 July 2023	Sahal Abdul Samad	Kerala Blasters	Mohun Bagan SG	
14 July 2023	Gursimrat Singh Gill	Mumbai City	East Bengal	
15 July 2023	Redeem Tlang	Goa	NorthEast United	
15 July 2023	(Australia) Joe Knowles	(Australia) Brisbane Roar	Hyderabad	
17 July 2023	(Serbia) Alen Stevanović	(Serbia) IMT	Jamshedpur	
17 July 2023	(Fiji) Roy Krishna	Bengaluru	Odisha	
17 July 2023	Buanthanglun Samte	TRAU	NorthEast United	
18 July 2023	(England) Curtis Main	(Scotland) St Mirren	Bengaluru	
19 July 2023	Imran Khan	NorthEast United	Jamshedpur	
20 July 2023	(Spain) Míchel Zabaco	(Spain) Burgos	NorthEast United	
20 July 2023	(Spain) Víctor Rodríguez	Odisha	Goa	
20 July 2023	Samuel Kynshi	Real Kashmir	Punjab	
20 July 2023	Kingsley Fernandes	Churchill Brothers	Punjab	
20 July 2023	Nitesh Darjee	Sudeva Delhi	Punjab	
21 July 2023	Ayush Adhikari	Kerala Blasters	Chennaiyin	
22 July 2023	Soraisham Dinesh Singh	Sreenidi Deccan	NorthEast United	
22 July 2023	Jayesh Rane	Bengaluru	Mumbai City (loan)	
23 July 2023	(Finland) Petteri Pennanen	(Finland) Ilves	Hyderabad	
24 July 2023	(Japan) Rei Tachikawa	(Malta) Sirens	Jamshedpur	
24 July 2023	Ranjeet Pandre	Church Boys United	Punjab	
24 July 2023	Amarjit Singh Kiyam	Goa	Punjab (loan)	
24 July 2023	Ricky Shabong	Mohun Bagan SG	Punjab	
24 July 2023	Nikhil Prabhu	Goa	Punjab	
24 July 2023	Tejas Krishna	Kerala Blasters	Punjab	
25 July 2023	(Spain) Néstor Albiach	(Spain) Rayo Majadahonda	NorthEast United	
25 July 2023	Jessel Carneiro	Kerala Blasters	Bengaluru	
25 July 2023	Shankar Sampingiraj	Punjab	Bengaluru	
25 July 2023	Jerry Lalrinzuala	East Bengal	Odisha	
26 July 2023	(Scotland) Connor Shields	(Scotland) Motherwell	Chennaiyin	

== Mid-season ==
All players and clubs without a flag are Indian.

Date	Player	Moving from	Moving to	Ref
8 January 2024	Mobashir Rahman	East Bengal	Chennaiyin (loan)	
9 January 2024	Vignesh Dakshinamurthy	Hyderabad	Odisha (loan)	
10 January 2024	(Lithuania) Fedor Černych	(Cyprus) AEL Limassol	Kerala Blasters	
