= 2019–20 FC Goa season =

2019–20 season of FC Goa

Goa
2019–20 season
- President: Akshay Tandon
- Head Coach: Sergio Lobera
- Stadium: Fatorda Stadium
- Indian Super League: 1st
- ISL playoffs: Semi-finals
- Top goalscorer: Coro (14)
Home colours	Away colours

The 2019–20 season was the club's sixth season since its establishment in 2014, and their sixth season in the Indian Super League.

== Players ==
As of 3 March 2020

Note: Flags indicate national team as defined under FIFA eligibility rules; some limited exceptions apply. Players may hold more than one non-FIFA nationality.

No.	Pos.	Nation	Player
4	MF	(France) FRA	Hugo Boumous
5	MF	(Morocco) MAR	Ahmed Jahouh
6	DF	(India) IND	Chinglensana Singh
7	FW	(India) IND	Seiminlen Doungel
8	FW	(Spain) ESP	Coro
9	FW	(India) IND	Manvir Singh
10	MF	(India) IND	Brandon Fernandes
11	MF	(India) IND	Princeton Rebello
12	MF	(India) IND	Jackichand Singh
13	GK	(India) IND	Mohammad Nawaz
17	DF	(Spain) ESP	Carlos Peña

No.	Pos.	Nation	Player
19	MF	(India) IND	Kingslee Fernandes
20	DF	(India) IND	Seriton Fernandes
21	DF	(India) IND	Saviour Gama
23	MF	(Spain) ESP	Edu Bedia
24	MF	(India) IND	Lenny Rodrigues
25	DF	(Senegal) SEN	Mourtada Fall
31	GK	(India) IND	Shubham Dhas
32	GK	(India) IND	Naveen Kumar
37	DF	(India) IND	Mohamed Ali
44	DF	(India) IND	Amey Ranawade
71	MF	(India) IND	Mandar Rao Dessai (captain)

=== Out on loan ===
Note: Flags indicate national team as defined under FIFA eligibility rules; some limited exceptions apply. Players may hold more than one non-FIFA nationality.

No.	Pos.	Nation	Player
—	MF	(India) IND	Alexander Romario Jesuraj (out on loan to Mohun Bagan)

== Competitions ==
=== Indian Super League ===
==== League table ====
Pos	Team	Pld	W	D	L	GF	GA	GD	Pts	Qualification
1	Goa (L)	18	12	3	3	46	23	+23	39	Qualification for 2021 AFC Champions League group stage and ISL playoffs
2	ATK (Note: Originally, Mohun Bagan, the 2019–20 I-League champions (they were already assured of the title before the league was abandoned due to the COVID-19 pandemic in India), would qualify as India 2 (2021 AFC Cup group stage), and ATK, the 2020 Indian Super League playoffs winners, would qualify as India 3 (2021 AFC Cup qualifying play-offs). However, ATK owners KGSPL ceased their football operation and bought majority stakes in Mohun Bagan FC (India) Private Limited and rebranded Mohun Bagan football team as ATK Mohun Bagan FC from the 2020–21 Indian Super League which qualified as India 2 in 2021 AFC club competition. The All India Football Federation decided that Bengaluru FC, the 2019–20 Indian Super League regular season 3rd place (behind FC Goa, which qualified for the 2021 AFC Champions League, and ATK), will qualify as India 3.) (C)	18	10	4	4	33	16	+17	34	Advance to ISL playoffs
3	Bengaluru	18	8	6	4	22	13	+9	30	Qualification for 2021 AFC Cup play-off round and ISL playoffs
4	Chennaiyin	18	8	5	5	32	26	+6	29	Advance to ISL playoffs
5	Mumbai City	18	7	5	6	25	29	−4	26	

Source: Indian Super League
Rules for classification: 1) points; 2) head-to-head points; 3) head-to-head goal difference; 4) head-to-head goals scored; 5) goal difference; 5) number of goals scored; 6) fair play ranking; 6) drawing of lots
(C) ISL Cup winners; (L) League Winners' Shield Winners

==== Results by matchday ====
Matchday	1	2	3	4	5	6	7	8	9	10	11	12	13	14	15	16	17	18
Ground	H	H	A	A	H	A	A	H	H	A	A	H	A	H	A	H	H	A
Result	W	D	D	W	L	D	W	W	W	W	L	W	L	W	W	W	W	W
Position	1	2	3	2	5	5	3	1	1	1	1	1	1	1	1	1	1	1

Updated to match(es) played on 19 February 2020. Source: soccerway
A = Away; H = Home; W = Win; D = Draw; L = Loss

==== Fixtures ====
League stage

23 October 2019 1	Goa	3–0	Chennaiyin	Margao
19:30 IST (UTC+05:30)	Rodrigues (yellow card) 15'; Doungel 30'; Coro 62'; Peña 81'	Report	Goian (yellow card) 80'	Stadium: Fatorda Stadium; Attendance: 13,017; Referee: Banerjee; Man of the Match: Fernandes (Goa)

28 October 2019 2	Goa	1–1	Bengaluru	Margao
19:30 IST (UTC+05:30)	Jahouh (yellow card) 71'; Dessai (yellow card) 77'; Coro 90+3' (pen.)	Report	Singh 62' (yellow card) 80'; Augusto (yellow card) 89'	Stadium: Fatorda Stadium; Attendance: 17,773; Referee: John; Man of the Match: Singh (Bengaluru)

1 November 2019 3	NorthEast United	2–2	Goa	Guwahati
19:30 IST (UTC+05:30)	Pradhan (yellow card) 33'; Leudo (yellow card) 37'; Gyan 54'; Tlang (yellow card) 58' (goal) 74'; Heerings (yellow card) 90+5'	Report	Boumous 31'; Doungel (red card) 90+3'; Singh 90+6'	Stadium: Indira Gandhi Athletic Stadium; Attendance: 17,273; Referee: Srikrishna; Man of the Match: Tlang (NorthEast)

7 November 2019 4	Mumbai City	2–4	Goa	Mumbai
19:30 IST (UTC+05:30)	Golui 49'; Chakrabarti 55' (yellow card) 70'	Report	Rodrigues 27'; Coro 45'; Boumous 59'; Fernandes (yellow card) 80'; Peña 89'	Stadium: Mumbai Football Arena; Attendance: 7,021; Referee: Bora; Man of the Match: Rodrigues (Goa)

28 October 2019 5	Goa	0–1	Jamshedpur	Margao
19:30 IST (UTC+05:30)	Jahouh (yellow card) 5' (yellow-red card) 72'; Bedia (yellow card) 27'; Fernandes (yellow card) 45+3'	Report	Singh (yellow card) 8'; Castel 17'; Tiri (yellow card) 53'; Acosta (yellow card) 70'	Stadium: Fatorda Stadium; Attendance: 14,119; Referee: R Venkatesh; Man of the Match: Castel (Jamshedpur)

1 December 2019 6	Kerala Blasters	2–2	Goa	Kochi
19:30 IST (UTC+05:30)	Cidoncha 1' (yellow card) 69'; Drobarov (yellow card) 40'; Bouli 59'	Report	Fall 41' (red card) 52'; Fernandes (yellow card) 45'; Bedia (yellow card) 62'; Rodrigues 90+2'	Stadium: Jawaharlal Nehru Stadium; Attendance: 21,157; Referee: John; Man of the Match: Rodrigues (Goa)

8 December 2019 7	Hyderabad	0–1	Goa	Hyderabad
19:30 IST (UTC+05:30)	Singh (yellow card) 41'; Marcelinho (yellow card) 76'	Report	Fernandes (yellow card) 49'; Singh (yellow card) 50'; Singh 68'; Nawaz (yellow card) 73'; Boumous (yellow card) 90+1'	Stadium: G. M. C. Balayogi Athletic Stadium; Attendance: 6,123; Referee: Baksi; Man of the Match: Singh (Goa)

14 December 2019 8	Goa	2–1	ATK	Margao
19:30 IST (UTC+05:30)	Fernandes (yellow card) 14'; Fall 60'; Coro 66'; Jahouh (yellow card) 75'	Report	Agus (yellow card) 8'; Singh (yellow card) 30'; Justin 64'	Stadium: Fatorda Stadium; Attendance: 12,817; Referee: Bora; Man of the Match: Fall (Goa)

22 December 2019 9	Goa	3–0	Odisha	Margao
19:30 IST (UTC+05:30)	Coro 19', 89' (pen.); Bedia (yellow card) 73'; Fernandes 85' (yellow card) 90+1'	Report	Delgado (yellow card) 43'; Bora (yellow card) 67'; Das (yellow card) 80'	Stadium: Fatorda Stadium; Attendance: 12,244; Referee: Meitei; Man of the Match: Coro (Goa)

26 December 2019 10	Chennaiyin	3–4	Goa	Chennai
19:30 IST (UTC+05:30)	Schembri 57'; Crivellaro 59', 90' (yellow card) 84'; Goian (yellow card) 65'; Vanspaul (yellow card) 85' (yellow-red card) 90+2'; Thapa (yellow card) 90+3'; Singh (yellow card) 90+4'	Report	Rodrigues (yellow card) 26'; Jahouh 26'; Fernandes 41'; Fall (yellow card) 44'; Boumous 45+1'; Coro 63'; Nawaz (yellow card) 79'; Peña (yellow card) 82'	Stadium: Jawaharlal Nehru Stadium; Attendance: 9,531; Referee: Bora; Man of the Match: Jahouh (Goa)

3 January 2020 11	Bengaluru	2–1	Goa	Bangalore
19:30 IST (UTC+05:30)	Paartalu (yellow card) 12'; Juanan (yellow card) 53'; Chhetri 59' 84'	Report	Boumous 61'	Stadium: Sree Kanteerava Stadium; Attendance: 13,509; Referee: (India) Coimbatore Ramaswamy Srikishna

8 January 2020 12	Goa	2–0	NorthEast United	Goa
19:30 IST (UTC+05:30)	Fernandes (yellow card) 38'; Komorski 68' (o.g.); Dessai (yellow card) 77'; Coro 82' (pen.)	Report	Singh (yellow card) 31'; Leudo (red card) 80'; Gallego (yellow card) 82'	Stadium: Fatorda Stadium; Attendance: 12,744; Referee: (India) Crystal John

18 January 2020 13	ATK	2–0	Goa	Kolkata
19:30 IST (UTC+05:30)	Kotal 47'; Agus (yellow card) 85'; Rane 88'		Boumous (yellow card) 54'; Jahouh (yellow card) 87'	Stadium: Salt Lake Stadium; Attendance: 23,552

25 January 2020 14	Goa	3-2	Kerala Blasters	Margao
19:30 IST (UTC+05:30)	Boumous 26', 83' (yellow card) 85'; Jackichand 45'; Brandon (yellow card) 83'; Jahouh (yellow card) 88'		Messi Bouli 53'; Moustapha (yellow card) 64'; Ogbeche 69'; Cidoncha (yellow card) 82'	Stadium: Fatorda Stadium; Attendance: 12,317; Referee: (India) L Ajitkumar Meitei

29 January 2020 15	Odisha	2-4	FC Goa	Bhubaneswar
19:30 IST (UTC+05:30)	Onwu 59' 65'; Dhot (yellow card) 79'; Bora (yellow card) 90'	Report	Rai 21' (o.g.); Jacki 24' 27'; Bedia (yellow card) 83'; Fernandes (yellow card) 89'; Coro 90'	Stadium: Kalinga Stadium; Attendance: 7,463; Referee: Pranjal Banerjee; Man of the Match: Jacki (Goa)

5 February 2020 16	Goa	4–1	Hyderabad	Margao
19:30 IST (UTC+05:30)	Boumous 19', 50'; Jahouh (yellow card) 63'; Coro 68', 87' (pen.)	Report	Rai (yellow card) 23'; Marcelinho 64'; Kilgallon (yellow card) 66'; Chakrabarti (yellow card) 85'	Stadium: Fatorda Stadium; Attendance: 10,212; Referee: Gupta; Man of the Match: Boumous (Goa)
