= 2020–21 in Indian football =

Indian football season

Football in India
- Season: 2020–21

Men's football
- ISL: Shield: Mumbai City; Cup: Mumbai City
- I-League: Gokulam Kerala
- I-League 2nd Div.: Rajasthan United

The 2020–21 season is the 133rd competitive association football season in India.

== Men's national team ==
=== India national football team ===
==== Friendlies ====
25 March 2021 Friendly	Oman	1–1	India	Dubai, United Arab Emirates
17:45 UTC+4:00	Amrinder Singh 43' (o.g.)		Manvir Singh 55'	Stadium: Maktoom Bin Rashid

29 March 2021 Friendly	United Arab Emirates	6–0	India	Dubai, United Arab Emirates
19:00 UTC+4:00				Stadium: Zabeel

=== Men's U-17 ===
==== Friendlies ====
10 January 2021 Friendly	India	1–0	(India) FC Goa Reserves	Goa

18 January 2021 Friendly	Liwa FC (United Arab Emirates)	0–1	India	Dubai, United Arab Emirates
			Ebindas	Stadium: Spanish Soccer School Ground

21 January 2021 Friendly	United Arab Emirates	3–0	India	Dubai, United Arab Emirates
				Stadium: UAE FA Stadium

24 January 2021 Friendly	United Arab Emirates	0–1	India	Dubai, United Arab Emirates
			Suhail	Stadium: UAE FA Stadium

26 January 2021 Friendly	Sharjah FC (United Arab Emirates)	2–4	India	Sharjah, United Arab Emirates
				Stadium: Sharjah Football Stadium

== Women's national team ==
=== Turkish Women's Cup ===
17 February Turkish Women's Cup	Serbia	2–0	India	Kargıcak, Turkey
	Matić 20'; Matejić	Report		Stadium: Gold City Sports Complex

19 February Turkish Women's Cup	Russia	8–0	India	Kargıcak, Turkey
		Report		Stadium: Gold City Sports Complex

23 February Turkish Women's Cup	India	2–3	Ukraine	Kargıcak, Turkey
	Xaxa 14'; Manisha 31'	Report	Kozvola 41'; Apanashchenko 62' (pen.), 90+3'	Stadium: Gold City Sports Complex

=== Friendlies ===
5 April Friendly	Uzbekistan	1–0	India	Uzbekistan
		Report (AIFF); Report (Soccerway)

8 April Friendly	India	1–2	Belarus	Uzbekistan
		Report (AIFF); Report (Soccerway)

== International Competitions ==
=== Next Gen Cup ===
Pos	Team	Pld	W	D	L	GF	GA	GD	Pts	Qualification	(England) CHE	(England) MNU	(India) RFYC	(India) FCG	(England) SOU	(India) BEN
1	(England) Chelsea	5	5	0	0	15	1	+14	15	Champions	—	1–0	—	5–0	2–0	4–0
2	(England) Manchester United	5	3	0	2	12	4	+8	9		—	—	0–1	—	—	5–1
3	(India) RFYC	5	3	0	2	7	4	+3	9		1–3	—	—	0–1	—	0–1
4	(India) FC Goa	5	3	0	2	4	10	−6	9		—	0–4	—	—	1–0	—
5	(England) Southampton	5	0	1	4	2	10	−8	1		—	1–3	0–3	—	—	1–1
6	(India) Bengaluru FC	5	0	1	4	3	15	−12	1		—	—	0–2	1–2	—	—

Source: KhelNow

== AFC competitions ==
=== 2021 AFC Champions League ===
==== Group stage ====
FC Goa qualified for the group stage but did not advance to knockout stage.

===== Group E =====
Pos	Team	Pld	W	D	L	GF	GA	GD	Pts	Qualification	PER	WAH	GOA	RAY
1	(Iran) Persepolis	6	5	0	1	14	5	+9	15	Advance to Round of 16	—	1–0	2–1	4–2
2	(United Arab Emirates) Al-Wahda	6	4	1	1	7	3	+4	13	Advance to Round of 16	1–0	—	0–0	3–2
3	(India) Goa (H)	6	0	3	3	2	9	−7	3		0–4	0–2	—	0–0
4	(Qatar) Al-Rayyan	6	0	2	4	6	12	−6	2		1–3	0–1	1–1	—

Source: AFC
(H) Hosts

=== 2021 AFC Cup ===
==== Preliminary round 2 ====
South Asia Zone
Team 1	Score	Team 2
Bengaluru (India)	5–0	Nepal Army Club

=== Group Stage (Gr. D) ===
Pos	Team	Pld	W	D	L	GF	GA	GD	Pts	Qualification	MBSG	BSK	BFC	MAZ
1	(India) ATK Mohun Bagan	3	2	1	0	6	2	+4	7	Inter-zone play-off semi-finals	—	1–1	2–0	—
2	(Bangladesh) Bashundhara Kings	3	1	2	0	3	1	+2	5		—	—	—	2–0
3	(India) Bengaluru	3	1	1	1	6	4	+2	4		—	0−0	—	—
4	(Maldives) Maziya (H)	3	0	0	3	3	11	−8	0		1–3	—	2–6	—

Source: AFC
(H) Hosts

After group stage, ATK Mohun Bagan faced Uzbek club FC Nasaf Qarshi in the inter zonal semi-finals. Soon, the got defeated and knocked out from that season with a scoreline of 0–6.

== Club competitions ==
=== Indian Super League ===
==== Regular season ====
Pos	Team	Pld	W	D	L	GF	GA	GD	Pts	Qualification
1	Mumbai City (L, C)	20	12	4	4	35	18	+17	40	Qualification to ISL playoffs and 2022 AFC Champions League group stage
2	ATK Mohun Bagan (Note: As the Premiers Mumbai City won the ISL playoffs, the regular season runners-up qualified for 2022 AFC Cup play-off round.)	20	12	4	4	28	15	+13	40	Qualification to ISL playoffs and 2022 AFC Cup play-off round
3	NorthEast United	20	8	9	3	31	25	+6	33	Qualification to ISL playoffs
4	Goa	20	7	10	3	31	23	+8	31	Qualification to ISL playoffs
5	Hyderabad	20	6	11	3	27	19	+8	29	
6	Jamshedpur	20	7	6	7	21	22	−1	27	
7	Bengaluru	20	5	7	8	26	28	−2	22	
8	Chennaiyin	20	3	11	6	17	23	−6	20	
9	East Bengal	20	3	8	9	22	33	−11	17	
10	Kerala Blasters	20	3	8	9	23	36	−13	17	
11	Odisha	20	2	6	12	25	44	−19	12	

Source: Indian Super League
Rules for classification: 1) points; 2) head-to-head points; 3) head-to-head goal difference; 4) head-to-head goals scored; 5) goal difference; 6) number of goals scored; 7) fair play ranking; 8) drawing of lots
(C) Champions; (L) League Winners' Shield Winners

==== Play-offs ====
Semi-finals
1	Mumbai City (p)	2	0	2 (6)
4	Goa	2	0	2 (5)
2	ATK Mohun Bagan	1	2	3
3	NorthEast United	1	1	2

Final
1	Mumbai City	2
2	ATK Mohun Bagan	1

=== I-League ===
Pos	Team	Pld	W	D	L	GF	GA	GD	Pts	Qualification (Note: Teams were split into two groups, Championship Stage (Group A) and Relegation Stage (Group B) after each team had played 10 matches.)
1	Gokulam Kerala (C)	15	9	2	4	31	17	+14	29	Champions and Qualification for 2022 AFC Cup group stage
2	Churchill Brothers	15	8	5	2	22	17	+5	29	
3	TRAU	15	7	5	3	27	19	+8	26	
4	Punjab	15	6	4	5	18	15	+3	22	
5	Real Kashmir	15	5	6	4	23	18	+5	21	
6	Mohammedan	15	5	5	5	18	20	−2	20	
7	Aizawl	14	7	3	4	21	12	+9	24	
8	Sudeva Delhi (Note: Sudeva Delhi were exempted from relegation for this season, as they had achieved a direct entry into the league.)	14	5	3	6	16	14	+2	18	
9	Chennai City	14	5	0	9	16	25	−9	15	
10	Indian Arrows (Note: Indian Arrows were exempted from relegation, as they are an AIFF developmental team.)	14	3	1	10	11	38	−27	10	
11	NEROCA (Note: NEROCA were relegated, but were reinstated by AIFF after the viewing the situation of the COVID-19 pandemic.)	14	2	2	10	14	22	−8	8	

Updated to match(es) played on 27 March 2021. Source: I-League
Rules for classification: 1) points; 2) head-to-head points; 3) head-to-head goal difference; 4) goal difference; 5) number of goals scored; 6) drawing of lots
(C) Champions

=== I-League 2nd Division ===
==== Final Round ====
Pos	Team	Pld	W	D	L	GF	GA	GD	Pts	Qualification
1	Rajasthan United (C)	3	2	1	0	3	0	+3	7	Promotion to 2021–22 I-League
2	Kenkre	3	1	2	0	2	1	+1	5	Promotion to 2021–22 I-League
3	Delhi	3	1	1	1	7	2	+5	4	
4	Madan Maharaj	3	0	0	3	0	9	−9	0	

Source: AIFF
(C) Champions

== New clubs ==
Club	Formation	Location	League	Tier
Techtro Swades United FC	29 August 2020	Una, Himachal Pradesh	Himachal Football League	4th
