= Phurba Lachenpa =

Indian footballer (born 1998)

Personal information
- Full name: Phurba Tempa Lachenpa
- Date of birth: 4 February 1998 (age 28)
- Place of birth: Sikkim, India
- Height: 1.83 m (6 ft 0 in)
- Position: Goalkeeper

Team information
- Current team: East Bengal
- Number: 1

Youth career
- Shillong Lajong

Senior career*
Years	Team	Apps	(Gls)
2015–2019	Shillong Lajong	22	(0)
2019–2020	Real Kashmir	15	(0)
2020–2026	Mumbai City	79	(0)
2026–	East Bengal	0	(0)
- * Club domestic league appearances and goals as of 16:50, 5 May 2026 (UTC)

Phurba Tempa Lachenpa (born 4 February 1998) is an Indian professional footballer who plays as a goalkeeper for Indian Super League club East Bengal.

== Club career ==
=== Shillong Lajong ===
He joined Shillong Lajong on 1 June 2015. Born in Sikkim, Lachenpa was a part of Shillong Lajong's youth side that competed in the Shillong Premier League. In September 2016, after recovering from a serious head injury, Lachenpa was named the club's player of the month. Shillong Lajong head coach, Thangboi Singto, praised Lachenpa saying "After suffering a serious head injury and undergoing an operation, he recovered and came back stronger and has shown a great improvement".

During the 2016–17 I-League season, Lachenpa was the club's second choice goalkeeper, behind Vishal Kaith. His only appearance and debut came in the last 2016–17 Indian Federation Cup group stage game against DSK Shivajians coming as a substitute after Vishal's red card in seventy fifth minute but Shillong managed to win 3–2. The next season, Lachenpa was made the club's first choice goalkeeper after Vishal's departure to FC Pune City and started in Shillong Lajong's first I-League match of the season against Gokulam Kerala. He kept the clean sheet as Shillong Lajong won 1–0. He made thirteen appearances and kept five cleansheets in the league. He also played in the quarterfinal 3–1 loss to Mohun Bagan of inaugural Indian Super Cup. In 2018-19 I-League, he made only nine appearances and kept one clean sheet against Minerva Punjab FC. Throughout the season he was dropped to bench to make space for Neithovilie Chalieu in the starting 11. Lachenpa suffered a serious injury in the eleventh minute against Chennai City FC which resulted in a miss of next two matches. He played his last match for Shillong in a 3–2 loss to Mohun Bagan in last league game. Shillong Lajong got relegated that season.

=== Real Kashmir ===
On 1 July 2019, following the expiration of his contract at Shillong, he joined I-League side Real Kashmir. He made his debut at Durand Cup in a 1–0 win over Chennai City FC. He kept cleansheets in all group stage games as Kashmir topped the group. But lost in the semifinal to Mohun Bagan 3–1. He made his league debut for Kashmir in a 1–1 draw to East Bengal on 4 December 2019. He made fifteen league appearances and kept five cleansheets as Kashmir finished fourth in the 2019-20 I-League where Kashmir's remaining five matches were cancelled due to the COVID-19 pandemic.

=== Mumbai City ===
==== 2020–21 ====
On 23 October 2020, Lachenpa signed for Indian Super League club Mumbai City on a four-year deal. He was the club's second choice goalkeeper, behind legendary Amrinder Singh.

Lachenpa made his debut and his only appearance of the league season, on 8 March, against Goa in the semi-final playoffs coming on in the 120th-minute, seconds before the penalty shootout. He saved the first penalty taken by Edu Bedia, as Mumbai City went on to win 6–5 on penalties and make it to their first-ever Indian Super League final. He won the Indian Super League Winners Shield and the Indian Super League title in his first season.

==== 2021–22 ====
After Amrinder's departure to Mohun Bagan he now became Mohammad Nawaz's backup. Lachenpa made his first appearance of the 2021–22 Indian Super League season, on 7 January 2022, against East Bengal, which ended in a 0–0 stalemate.

He was later included in the club's 2022 AFC Champions League squad. He was between the sticks in the club's AFC Champions League debut match, on 8 April 2022, against Al Shabab which ended in a 3–0 defeat. Three days later, he was part of a historic 2–1 win against Al-Quwa Al-Jawiya, as Mumbai City became the first Indian club to win a Champions League game. He kept his first clean-sheet in a goalless draw against Al Jazira on April 18. 8 days later, he kept another clean sheet in a 1–0 win over Al-Quwa Al-Jawiya. Mumbai finished second in the group behind Al Shabab with seven points failing to advance to knockout stage. But Mumbai's performance was the best ever performance ever by an Indian Club at AFC Champions League.

==== 2022–23 ====
For 2022–23 season, he became the first choice keeper. He played in six matches of 2022 Durand Cup. In group stage game against Rajasthan United, he collided with Bektur Amangeldiev and had to be substituted in a 5–1 win which also resulted in the next match miss. He kept a clean-sheet in the semi-final 1–0 win over I-League side Mohammedan. He played in the final where Mumbai lost 2–1 to Bengaluru FC. He played in all games of ISL season keeping seven cleansheets with Mumbai finishing top of the table winning the Winners' Shield. In playoffs, He played in both legs against Bengaluru FC; the first one ended in a 1–0 loss and the second one in a 2–1 win taking it to penalty shootout where his side lost 9–8.

He played in Indian club qualifiers for 2023–24 AFC competitions where Mumbai defeated Jamshedpur FC 3–1 to seal 2023–24 AFC Champions League spot. He also played in 2023 Indian Super Cup group stage games against Churchill Brothers and NorthEast United FC where first one ended in a 2–1 win and second one in a loss by same margin. He missed last group stage game against Chennaiyin FC due to a minor injury with Mumbai being eliminated in group stage on goal difference. On 28 June 2023, Lachenpa extended his contract keeping him at the club until 2026.

==== 2023–24 ====
On 28 October 2023, in Mumbai's match against Hyderabad FC, Phurba was shown a red card for a rash challenge on Joe Knowles, as the team suffered a 1–1 draw. Phurba got his first clean sheet of the season on 8 December 2023, in the team's match versus Bengaluru FC. This was followed up by two more consecutive clean sheets, versus FC Goa and East Bengal FC. He started all 6 of Mumbai's 2023–24 AFC Champions League group stage matches, as the club were knocked out in the group stage without winning a single match.

In the 2024 Indian Super Cup, Phurba was named Mumbai captain for the first time, in their match against I-League club Gokulam Kerala FC. This was since regular club captain Rahul Bheke had been called up for the Indian national team for the AFC Asian Cup, and vice-captain Rostyn Griffiths was injured. While Phurba did make an early mistake leading to Gokulam's star forward Alex Sanchez scoring an easy tap-in, he recovered well and made a number of top saves to keep The Islanders in the game, which ended 2–1 to Mumbai following a last-minute Abdenasser El Khayati penalty. He was named captain again for the subsequent clash against Punjab FC, a game in which he shone, making numerous crucial saves in the game, which ended 3–2 to Mumbai, thanks to a brace from Ayush Chhikara, and a last-minute tap-in from Seilenthang Lotjem. He continued as captain in the team's final group stage match against Chennaiyin FC, making a number of top saves, keeping a clean sheet, and being named Man of the Match, in an eventual 1–0 win, thanks to a first-half Valpuia header from a Yoell van Nieff set piece. However, Mumbai lost in the semi-final to Odisha FC, thanks to a 42nd-minute penalty from ex-Mumbai forward Diego Maurício.

After the semi-final loss, and another loss against Jamshedpur FC in the first ISL match after the Super Cup, Phurba remained in goal as The Islanders went on a 9-match unbeaten streak. After losing the ISL Shield on the final day, Mumbai reached and won the ISL final, securing the second ISL Cup in the club's history.

==== 2024–25 ====
Phurba again started the season as Mumbai's first choice goalkeeper, keeping his first clean sheet of the season in a 0–0 draw versus Bengaluru FC on 2 October 2024.

== Career statistics ==
As of 12 July 2023

Club	Season	League			Cup		AFC		Total	
Club	Season	Division	Apps	Goals	Apps	Goals	Apps	Goals	Apps	Goals
Shillong Lajong	2016–17	I-League	0	0	1 (Note: Appearance in Federation Cup)	0	—		1	0
Shillong Lajong	2017–18	I-League	13	0	1 (Note: Appearance in AIFF Super Cup)	0	—		14	0
Shillong Lajong	2018–19	I-League	9	0	0	0	—		9	0
Shillong Lajong	Total		22	0	2	0	0	0	24	0
Real Kashmir	2019–20	I-League	15	0	4 (Note: Appearances in Durand Cup)	0	—		19	0
Mumbai City	2020–21	Indian Super League	1	0	0	0	—		1	0
Mumbai City	2021–22	Indian Super League	3	0	0	0	5 (Note: Appearances in AFC Champions League)	0	8	0
Mumbai City	2022–23	Indian Super League	22	0	8 (Note: Two appearances in AIFF Super Cup, six appearances in Durand Cup)	0	1 (Note: Appearance in Indian club qualifiers for 2023–24 AFC competitions)	0	31	0
Mumbai City	Total		26	0	8	0	6	0	40	0
Career total			63	0	14	0	6	0	83	0

== Honours ==
Mumbai City

- Indian Super League: 2020–21
- Indian Super League Winners' Shield: 2020–21, 2022–23
- ISL Cup: 2023–24

India

- Tri-Nation Series: 2023

Individual

- Indian Super League Golden Glove: 2023–24
