= 2021 Indian Super League final =

Association football match

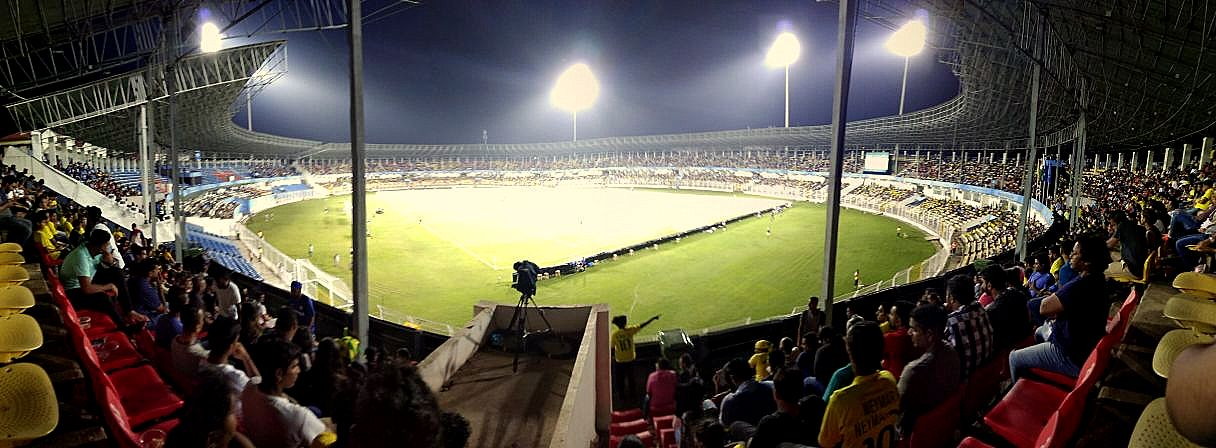
- Event: 2020–21 Indian Super League
Mumbai City	ATK Mohun Bagan
(India)	(India)
2	1
- Date: 13 March 2021
- Venue: Fatorda Stadium, Margao, Goa
- Man of the Match: Bipin Singh
- Attendance: 0

The 2021 Indian Super League final was the final match of the 2020–21 Indian Super League, the seventh season of the Indian Super League. It was played on 13 March 2021 at the Fatorda Stadium, Goa, between Mumbai City and ATK Mohun Bagan, who finished first and second in the league table during the regular season respectively.

Owing to COVID-19 pandemic in India the final was played behind closed doors as well as the every match of the regular season and play-offs.

== Background ==
Mumbai City entered the final as the premiers of the regular season, having edged out Mohun Bagan on head-to-head record with a 2–0 win on the final matchday after the teams finished level on points. It was Mumbai City's first final, having previously lost in the semi-finals in the 2016 and 2018–19 seasons. Mumbai City defeated FC Goa in the semi-finals in a penalty-shootout after the two finished 2–2 over aggregate.

Mohun Bagan also competed in the final for the first time, they reached the final, having seen off third-place NorthEast United, by an aggregate score of 3–2 in their semi-final clash.

== Match ==
13 March 2021
19:30 IST

Mumbai City	2–1	Mohun Bagan
Tiri 29' (o.g.); Singh 90'	Report	Williams 18'

Fatorda Stadium, Margao
Attendance: 0
Referee: Tejas Nagavenkar

Mumbai City	Mohun Bagan

GK	1	(India) Amrinder Singh
RB	4	(India) Amey Ranawade		(substituted off) 46'
CB	25	(Senegal) Mourtada Fall
CB	6	(Spain) Hernán Santana	(yellow card) 20'
LB	23	(India) Vignesh Dakshinamurthy	(yellow card) 60'
DM	5	(Morocco) Ahmed Jahouh
MF	11	(India) Raynier Fernandes
MF	7	(France) Hugo Boumous		(substituted off) 84'
FW	29	(India) Bipin Singh	(yellow card) 90+1'
FW	9	(England) Adam Le Fondre		(substituted off) 71'
Substitutes:
GK	34	(India) Phurba Lachenpa
DF	2	(India) Mohammad Rakip		(substituted on) 46'
DF	3	(India) Tondonba Singh
FW	10	(Nigeria) Bartholomew Ogbeche		(substituted on) 71'
DF	15	(India) Mehtab Singh
ST	19	(India) Pranjal Bhumij
MF	20	(India) Jackichand Singh
MF	21	(Japan) Cy Goddard		(substituted on) 86'
FW	22	(India) Vikram Pratap Singh
Manager:
(Spain) Sergio Lobera

GK 29	Arindam Bhattacharya
CB 5	(India) Sandesh Jhingan
CB 44	(Spain) Tiri	(yellow card) 85'
CB 20	(India) Pritam Kotal	(yellow card) 55'
LB	(India) Subhasish Bose
(Spain) Javi Hernández	(substituted off) 90+1'
(Republic of Ireland) Carl McHugh	(yellow card) 49'
(India) Lenny Rodrigues	(substituted off) 85'
(India) Manvir Singh
(Australia) David Williams	(substituted off) 23'
(Fiji) Roy Krishna
Substitutes:
(India) Sumit Rathi
(India) Komal Thatal
(India) Avilash Paul
(India) Jayesh Rane	(substituted on) 85'
(India) Pronay Halder
(India) Salam Ranjan Singh
(India) Michael Regin
(India) Prabir Das
(Brazil) Marcelinho	(substituted on) 90+1'
Manager:
(Spain) Antonio López

Man of the Match:
(India) Bipin Singh (Mumbai City)

Match rules

- 90 minutes.
- 30 minutes of extra-time if necessary.
- Penalty shoot-out if scores still level.
- nine named substitutes.
- Maximum of five substitutions.
