= Cy Goddard =

Japanese footballer (born 1997)

Cy Goddard サイ ゴダード
Personal information
- Full name: Cy Stephen Goddard
- Date of birth: 2 April 1997 (age 29)
- Place of birth: London, England
- Height: 1.78 m (5 ft 10 in)
- Positions: Attacking midfielder; central midfielder

Youth career
- 2006–2018: Tottenham Hotspur

Senior career*
Years	Team	Apps	(Gls)
2018–2021	Benevento	2	(0)
2019–2020	→ Pafos (loan)	6	(0)
2020–2021	→ Mumbai City (loan)	19	(1)
2021–2022	Central Coast Mariners	21	(1)
2022–2023	Detroit City	10	(0)
2023–2024	Odisha	14	(0)
2024–2025	Hyderabad	22	(1)
2025–2026	Lee Man	21	(2)

International career
2013–2014	Japan U16	8	(2)
2014	Japan U17	3	(0)
- * Club domestic league appearances and goals as of 17 May 2026

Cy Stephen Goddard (サイ ゴダード, Sai Godādo; born 2 April 1997) is a professional footballer who plays as a winger. Born in England, he has represented Japan at youth level.

== Club career ==
=== Youth career at Tottenham Hotspur ===
Born in London, England, Goddard joined Tottenham Hotspur Academy as a first year scholar, having joined at a young age he progressed through the academy. He spent five years developing at the U18 and U21 sides. At the end of the 2014–15 season, Goddard extended his contract with the club. In July 2017, it was reported that Goddard did not join the club's first team for the USA tour squad; it came after when he turned down the contract extension from Tottenham Hotspur and seek to leave the club.

=== Benevento Calcio ===
In August 2018, Goddard joined Serie B side Benevento on a three-year contract. On 18 November 2018, Goddard made his senior debut, as an 82nd-minute substitute in a 3–1 loss to Spezia. Goddard spent most of the season on the substitute bench, as he made two appearances for the side in his first season at Benevento Calcio.

==== Loan Spells from Benevento Calcio ====
On 1 September 2019, Goddard joined Cypriot First Division club Pafos. It was later revealed to be a loan deal. He made his debut for the club, coming on as an 82nd-minute substitute, in a 2–0 lost against AEL Limassol on 4 November 2019. Goddard made eight appearances for Pafos in all competitions, as the league was abandoned due to COVID-19 pandemic.

=== Mumbai City ===
On 3 October 2020, Goddard joined Indian Super League club Mumbai City on a year-long loan deal. Due to his Japanese citizenship, he was placed under the club's mandatory Asian player quota. He made his debut for the club, coming on as a 58th-minute substitute, in a 1–0 loss against NorthEast United on 21 November 2020. On 24 February 2021, Goddard scored his first goal in his professional career, in a 6–1 win against Odisha. With Mumbai, he helped Mumbai win the double, as they won both the League Winners Shield and the Play-offs. At the end of the 2020–21 season, Goddard made nineteen appearances and scoring once in all competitions.

=== Central Coast Mariners ===
Goddard signed a two-year deal with A-League side Central Coast Mariners in August 2021. Upon joining the club, he revealed that his then Mumbai City teammate Adam Le Fondre helped him make a move to Central Coast Mariners.

Goddard made his debut for the club in the opening game of the season against Newcastle Jets and set up the second goal of the game, in a 2–1 win. On 18 December 2021, he scored his second goal for Central Coast Mariners, in a 2–0 win against Western Sydney Wanderers. At the end of the 2021-22 season, Goddard made twenty-six appearances and scoring once in all competitions.

=== Detroit City ===
On 26 July 2022, Goddard joined second-tier US side Detroit City who compete in the USL Championship. He made his debut for the club, coming on as a 84th minute substitute, in a 2–1 win against Colorado Springs Switchbacks on 11 September 2022. Having made five appearances for Detroit City, Goddard stayed at the club for the 2023 season. However, his first team chance at Detroit City hard to come by, as he made ten appearances for the club. It was reported by The Detroit News on 26 June 2023 that Goodard left by mutual consent.

=== Odisha ===
On 30 August 2023, Goddard returned to the Indian Super League to join Odisha on a one-year deal.

Goddard made his debut for the club, coming on as a 72nd minute substitute, in a 3–2 loss against FC Goa on 7 October 2023. Goddard followed up by assisting each goal in the next two matches against Kerala Blasters and Bengaluru. On 27 November 2023, he scored his first goal for Odisha, in a 5–2 win against Mohun Bagan in the AFC Cup.

=== Hyderabad ===
On 19 September 2024, Goddard was transferred to Hyderabad.

=== Lee Man ===
On 9 July 2025, Goddard joined Hong Kong Premier League club Lee Man.

== International career ==
Goddard was born in England to an English father and a Japanese mother. He holds dual-citizenship. He has represented Japan at the under-16 and under-17 levels.

== Career statistics ==
=== Club ===
As of 15 September 2026

Appearances and goals by club, season and competition
Club	Season	League			National cup (Note: Includes Cypriot Cup, FFA Cup, AIFF Super Cup)		League cup (Note: Includes Hong Kong League Cup)		Other		Total	
Club	Season	Division	Apps	Goals	Apps	Goals	Apps	Goals	Apps	Goals	Apps	Goals
Benevento	2018–19	Serie B	2	0	0	0	—		0	0	2	0
Benevento	2019–20	Serie B	0	0	0	0	—		—		0	0
Benevento	2020–21	Serie A	0	0	0	0	—		—		0	0
Benevento	Total		2	0	0	0	0	0	0	0	2	0
Pafos (loan)	2019–20	Cypriot First Division	6	0	2	0	—		—		8	0
Mumbai City (loan)	2020–21	Indian Super League	19	1	—		—		—		19	1
Central Coast Mariners	2021–22	A-League Men	21	1	5	0	—		—		26	1
Detroit City	2022	USL Championship	7	0	0	0	—		—		7	0
Detroit City	2023	USL Championship	5	0	0	0	—		—		5	0
Detroit City	Total		12	0	0	0	0	0	0	0	12	0
Odisha	2023–24	Indian Super League	14	0	4	0	0	0	8 (Note: Appearances in the AFC Cup)	1	26	1
Hyderabad	2024–25	Indian Super League	21	1	1	0	—		—		22	1
Lee Man	2025–26	Hong Kong Premier League	21	2	0	0	2	0	0	0	23	2
Career total			116	5	12	0	2	0	8	1	138	6

== Honours ==
Mumbai City

- Indian Super League: 2020–21
- Indian Super League Premiers: 2020–21

Lee Man

- Hong Kong League Cup: 2025–26

== See also ==
- List of Central Coast Mariners FC players
- List of foreign A-League Men players
- List of foreign Serie B players
- List of Japan international footballers born outside Japan
