= 2021–22 Mumbai City FC season =

Mumbai City FC
2021–22 season
- Manager: Des Buckingham
- Stadium: Fatorda Stadium
- Indian Super League: 5th
- AFC Champions League: Group Stages
- Play-offs: DNQ
- Top goalscorer: League: Igor Angulo (10); All: Igor Angulo (10)

The 2021–22 season is the club's eight season since its establishment in 2014, and their eight season in the Indian Super League.

== Preseason friendlies ==
26 March 2022 Friendly	Al-Ain (United Arab Emirates)	1–2	(India) Mumbai City	Al Ain, UAE
		Report	Jahouh ?'; Apuia ?'	Stadium: Khalifa bin Zayed Stadium; Attendance: 0

30 March 2022 Friendly	Al-Hilal United (United Arab Emirates)	0–2	(India) Mumbai City	Dubai, UAE
		Report	Bipin ?'; Mauricio ?'	Stadium: The Sevens Stadium; Attendance: 0

== Players ==
As of 31 January 2022

Note: Flags indicate national team as defined under FIFA eligibility rules; some limited exceptions apply. Players may hold more than one non-FIFA nationality.

No.	Pos.	Nation	Player
1	GK	IND	Phurba Lachenpa
2	DF	IND	Rahul Bheke
4	DF	IND	Amey Ranawade
5	DF	IND	Mehtab Singh
6	FW	IND	Vikram Pratap Singh
9	FW	IND	Gurkirat Singh
10	MF	MAR	Ahmed Jahouh
11	MF	IND	Raynier Fernandes
12	DF	IND	Mohammad Rakip
13	GK	IND	Mohammad Nawaz
14	MF	IND	Rowllin Borges (vice-captain)
16	MF	IND	Vinit Rai (on loan from Odisha)

No.	Pos.	Nation	Player
19	FW	IND	Pranjal Bhumij
23	DF	IND	Vignesh Dakshinamurthy
25	DF	SEN	Mourtada Fall (captain)
28	MF	IND	Naorem Tondomba Singh
29	FW	IND	Bipin Singh
30	MF	IND	Chanso Horam
31	DF	IND	Valpuia
32	GK	IND	Vikram Lakhbir Singh
39	MF	IND	Asif Khan
43	MF	IND	Lallianzuala Chhangte
45	MF	IND	Apuia
77	DF	IND	Mandar Rao Dessai (3rd captain)

== Competitions ==
=== Group B ===
Pos	Team	Pld	W	D	L	GF	GA	GD	Pts	Qualification	SHB	MUM	QWJ	AJZ
1	(Saudi Arabia) Al-Shabab (H)	6	5	1	0	18	1	+17	16	Advance to Round of 16	—	6–0	3–0	3–0
2	(India) Mumbai City	6	2	1	3	3	11	−8	7 (Note: Head-to-head points: Mumbai City 6, Al-Quwa Al-Jawiya 0.)		0–3	—	1–0	0–0
3	(Iraq) Al-Quwa Al-Jawiya	6	2	1	3	7	10	−3	7		1–1	1–2	—	3–2
4	(United Arab Emirates) Al-Jazira	6	1	1	4	4	10	−6	4		0–2	1–0	1–2	—

Source: AFC
Rules for classification: Tiebreakers
(H) Hosts

==== Matches ====
7 April 2022
20:15 UTC+3

Mumbai City (India)	0 – 3	(Saudi Arabia) Al-Shabab
	Report	36', 69' Éver Banega; 67' Turki Al-Ammar

Prince Faisal bin Fahd Stadium
Attendance: 3000
Referee: (Malaysia) Yaacob M.

11 April 2022
20:15 UTC+3

Al-Quwa Al-Jawiya (Iraq)	1–2	(India) Mumbai City
Ahmed 59'	Report	Mauricio 70' (pen.); Bheke 75'

King Fahd International Stadium, Riyadh
Attendance: 0
Referee: Hanna Hattab (Syria)

14 April 2022

(United Arab Emirates) Al-Jazira	1–0	Mumbai City (India)
Ali Mabkhout 59' (pen.)	Report

King Fahd International Stadium, Riyadh

18 April 2022

Mumbai City (India)	0 – 0	(United Arab Emirates) Al-Jazira

Referee: (Japan) Kimura H.

22 April 2022

Al-Shabab (Saudi Arabia)	6 – 0	(India) Mumbai City
Hattan Bahebri 19', 64', 66'; Mourtada Fall 36' (A.g.); Abdullah Al-Jouei 52'; Carlos Carvalho 81'

Prince Faisal bin Fahd Stadium
Referee: (China) Fu M.

26 April 2022

Mumbai City (India)	1-0	(Iraq) Al-Quwa Al-Jawiya
Diego Maurício 31'

King Fahd International Stadium, Riyadh
Referee: (Jordan) Mohammad A.
