= Amey Ranawade =

Indian footballer (born 1998)

Personal information
- Full name: Amey Ganesh Ranawade
- Date of birth: 7 March 1998 (age 28)
- Place of birth: Mumbai, India
- Height: 1.67 m (5 ft 6 in)
- Position: Right back

Team information
- Current team: Kerala Blasters

Youth career
- 2011–2016: AIFF Elite Academy

Senior career*
Years	Team	Apps	(Gls)
2016–2017	DSK Shivajians	0	(0)
2017–2018	Goa	0	(0)
2018	Mohun Bagan	4	(0)
2019–2020	Goa	2	(0)
2020	Bengaluru United	7	(0)
2020–2025	Mumbai City	33	(0)
2023–2025	→ Odisha (loan)	46	(1)
2025–	Kerala Blasters	1	(0)
2026	→ Mohun Bagan SG (loan)	8	(0)

International career
2011–2013	India U17	25	(0)
2013–2015	India U20	5	(0)
- * Club domestic league appearances and goals as of 17:30, 5 March 2025 (UTC)

Amey Ganesh Ranawade (born 7 March 1998) is an Indian professional footballer who plays as a full back for Indian Super League club Kerala Blasters.

== Early life ==
Amey was born and raised in Mumbai. He credits his father for providing him the motivation and support in taking up football. Amey first began playing football with his school Fr. Agnel Multipurpose School and Junior College in Vashi, Navi Mumbai. From there, he was picked to train in AIFF Elite Academy in Goa after impressing coaches during an open trial in Kolkata. He represented India at the U-17 and U-19 levels in various international competitions. In 2016, Amey left the academy and joined his first professional football club, a Pune-based I League club, DSK Shivajians.

== Career ==
=== DSK Shivajians FC ===
Amey had his first taste of success as he went on to lift the DSK Cup with the club.

=== FC Goa ===
He joined ISL team FC Goa ahead of the 2017-18 campaign. Amey made his debut for the club in the Hero Super Cup 2018 semi-finals against East Bengal.

=== Mohun Bagan ===
In April 2018, Amey joined the I-League side Mohun Bagan for the 2018–19 season. He helped the club to win the Calcutta Football League and made four appearances for the club in the I-League season.

=== FC Goa ===
In September 2019, Amey returned to FC Goa on a one-year deal. He made his ISL debut in a match vs NorthEast United.

=== FC Bengaluru United ===
In 2020, he joined Bengaluru United for their I-League 2nd Division campaign.

=== Mumbai City FC ===
In October 2020, Amey signed a one-year deal with Mumbai City FC. He had a breakthrough season for the club, making 20 appearances in the 2020-21 ISL season. On 13 March 2021, while playing the 2021 ISL Final, he was taken away from the pitch in an ambulance after suffering a head injury in the first-half stoppage time which Mumbai won. On 17 June 2021, Ranawade signed four years contract extension with club, where he will stay till May, 2025. He was later included in club's 2022 AFC Champions League squad.

=== Odisha FC ===
In June 2023, Amey joined Odisha FC on a season long loan deal to reunite with former coach Sergio Lobera. On 31 October 2023, Ranawade scored the winning goal at home against Bengaluru FC in the league, ending the match 3–2. Overall, he had a successful season at the club, finishing with the highest number of assists among defenders and helping Odisha FC reach the semi-finals of ISL for the first time. On 23 May 2024, he received his maiden national team call-up as part of the 27-member squad for the World Cup Qualifiers clash vs Kuwait. At the beginning of the new season, the loan deal was extended with Odisha FC for another season.

=== Kerala Blasters ===
In January 2025 Amey signed precontract with Blasters.

== Career statistics ==
=== Club ===
As of match played 30 October 2025

Club	Season	League			Cup		AFC		Total	
Club	Season	Division	Apps	Goals	Apps	Goals	Apps	Goals	Apps	Goals
DSK Shivajians	2016–17	I-League	0	0	0	0	–		0	0
Goa	2017–18	Indian Super League	0	0	1 (Note: Appearance(s) in Super Cup)	0	–		1	0
Mohun Bagan	2018–19	I-League	4	0	0	0	–		4	0
Goa	2019–20	Indian Super League	2	0	0	0	–		2	0
Bengaluru United	2020	I-League 2	4	0	0	0	–		4	0
Mumbai City	2020–21	Indian Super League	20	0	0	0	–		20	0
Mumbai City	2021–22	Indian Super League	13	0	0	0	2 (Note: Appearance(s) in AFC Champions League)	0	15	0
Mumbai City	2022–23	Indian Super League	0	0	5 (Note: Appearance(s) in Durand Cup)	0	–		5	0
Mumbai City	Total		33	0	5	0	2	0	40	0
Odisha (loan)	2023–24	Indian Super League	24	1	5	0	7 (Note: Appearance(s) in AFC Cup)	1	36	2
Odisha (loan)	2024–25	Indian Super League	22	0	1	0	–		23	0
Odisha (loan)	Total		46	1	6	0	7	1	59	2
Kerala Blasters	2025–26	Indian Super League	0	0	1	0	–		1	0
Mohun Bagan SG (loan)	2025–26	Indian Super League	0	0	0	0	–		0	0
Career total			89	1	13	0	9	1	111	2

== Honours ==
=== Club ===
Mohun Bagan

- Calcutta Football League: 2018–19

Mumbai City

- Indian Super League: 2020–21, 2022–23
- ISL Cup: 2020–21
