= Vignesh Dakshinamurthy =

Indian professional footballer

Personal information
- Date of birth: 5 March 1998 (age 28)
- Place of birth: Srirampura, Karnataka, India
- Height: 1.81 m (5 ft 11 in)
- Position: Left-back

Team information
- Current team: Chennaiyin
- Number: 23

Youth career
- Ozone

Senior career*
Years	Team	Apps	(Gls)
2017–2018	Ozone	18	(0)
2018–2023	Mumbai City	53	(2)
2023–2024	Hyderabad	6	(0)
2024	→ Odisha (loan)	11	(0)
2024–	Chennaiyin	0	(0)

International career^{‡}
2018	India	2	(0)
- * Club domestic league appearances and goals as of 17:46, 28 April 2024 (UTC). ‡ National team caps and goals as of 07:10, 22 September 2018 (UTC)

Vignesh Dakshinamurthy (born 5 March 1998) is an Indian professional footballer who plays as a left-back for Indian Super League club Chennaiyin.

== Club career ==
Born in Srirampura, Karnataka, Dakshinamurthy started his career with Ozone academy before being promoted to their first-team and playing for them in the I-League 2nd Division.

=== Mumbai City ===
On 8 September 2018, it was announced that Dakshinamurthy signed with Indian Super League side Mumbai City. On 20 December 2020, Vignesh scored his first goal in Indian Super League as well as for Mumbai City against Hyderabad in which he found the net in the 38th minute as Mumbai City won for 2–0. In April 2022, he was included in the club's 2022 AFC Champions League squad.

=== Hyderabad FC ===
On 10 July 2023, Dakshinamurthy joined Hyderabad FC as part of a swap deal with Akash Mishra.

==== Odisha FC (loan) ====
On 9 January 2024, he joined Odisha FC on a short-term loan till the end of the 2023–24 season.

== International career ==
Dakshinamurthy previously represented India at the under-20 and under-17 levels.

On 15 July 2018, Dakshinamurthy was called up by Stephen Constantine to the India senior side as they prepared for the 2018 SAFF Championship. On 4 September 2018, it was announced that Dakshinamurthy was selected into the final 20-man squad for the tournament. He then made his international debut for India on 9 September in their last group game against Maldives. He came on as a halftime substitute for Lallianzuala Chhangte as India won 2–0.

== Personal life ==
Daksinamurthy is the nephew of former India international, Shanmugam Venkatesh.

== Career statistics ==
=== Club ===
As of 28 April 2024

Club	Season	League			Cup		AFC		Total	
Club	Season	Division	Apps	Goals	Apps	Goals	Apps	Goals	Apps	Goals
Ozone	2016–17	I-League 2nd Division	6	0	0	0	—		6	0
Ozone	2017–18	I-League 2nd Division	12	0	0	0	—		12	0
Ozone	Total		18	0	0	0	0	0	18	0
Mumbai City	2018–19	Indian Super League	4	0	1 (Note: Appearance(s) in Super Cup)	0	—		5	0
Mumbai City	2019–20	Indian Super League	1	0	0	0	—		1	0
Mumbai City	2020–21	Indian Super League	22	1	0	0	—		22	1
Mumbai City	2021–22	Indian Super League	10	0	0	0	4 (Note: Appearance(s) in AFC Champions League)	0	14	0
Mumbai City	2022–23	Indian Super League	16	1	7 (Note: Appearance(s) in Durand Cup)	0	1 (Note: Appearance(s) in play–offs for AFC Champions League)	0	24	1
Mumbai City	Total		53	2	8	0	5	0	66	2
Hyderabad	2023–24	Indian Super League	6	0	0	0	—		6	0
Odisha (loan)	2023–24	Indian Super League	11	0	5	0	1 (Note: Appearance(s) in AFC Cup)	0	17	0
Chennaiyin	2024–25	Indian Super League	0	0	0	0	—		0	0
Career total			88	2	13	0	6	0	107	2

=== International ===
As of 22 September 2018.

National Team	Year	Friendlies		Qualifiers		Competition		Total	
National Team	Year	Apps	Goals	Apps	Goals	Apps	Goals	Apps	Goals
India	2018	2	0	0	0	2	0	4	0
Total		2	0	0	0	2	0	4	0

== Honours ==
Mumbai City

- Indian Super League: 2020–21
- Indian Super League League Winners Shield: 2020–21

India

- SAFF Championship runner-up: 2018
