= Ahmed Jahouh =

Moroccan association football player (born 1988)

Personal information
- Full name: Ahmed Jahouh
- Date of birth: 31 July 1988 (age 38)
- Place of birth: Al Aaroui, Morocco
- Height: 1.87 m (6 ft 2 in)
- Position: Defensive midfielder

Youth career
- Fath Nador

Senior career*
Years	Team	Apps	(Gls)
2006–2008	Fath Nador		
2008–2010	Ittihad Khemisset		
2010–2015	Moghreb Tétouan	99	(9)
2012	→ Al-Ittihad Kalba (loan)	9	(1)
2015–2016	Raja CA	13	(2)
2016–2017	FUS Rabat	19	(1)
2017–2018	→ Goa (loan)	19	(0)
2018–2020	Goa	37	(1)
2020–2023	Mumbai City	56	(5)
2023–2025	Odisha	38	(3)
2025–	Fath Nador	0	(0)

International career^{‡}
2012–2016	Morocco	9	(0)
Medal record
Men's football
Representing Morocco
Arab Cup
Winner	2012 Saudi Arabia
- * Club domestic league appearances and goals as of 13:00, 23 August 2025 (UTC) ‡ National team caps and goals as of 20 January 2016

Ahmed Jahouh (Arabic: أحمد جحوح; born 31 July 1988) is a Moroccan professional footballer who plays as a defensive midfielder for GNFA 1 club Fath Nador.

== Club career ==
=== Earlier career ===
Born in Al Aaroui, Jahouh started his career with Ittihad Khemisset. In 2010, he joined Moghreb Tétouan. Jahouh went on to win the 2011–12 Botola and the 2013–14 Botola with Moghreb. On 28 September 2012, he joined Emirati club Al-Ittihad Kalba on a year long loan deal. In January 2013, he was released by Kalba. On 8 September 2015, he signed with Raja Casablanca and penned a three-year contract. After being used sparingly by Casablanca, he joined FUS Rabat on 25 July 2016 on a three-year contract. On 31 October, he scored his first goal for the club in a 2–2 draw against Casablanca.

=== Goa ===
On 2 August 2017, Jahouh joined Indian Super League side Goa on a season-long loan. He became the first Moroccan footballer to play in India. During the season, he refused to display a sponsor logo of an alcohol brand on match shirt citing religious reasons. Jahouh extended his stay at the club after a successful debut season on loan. In May 2019, he signed a one-year contract extension with the club. With most successful tackles and passes, Jahouh played a pivotol role in Goa's top of the league finish in the 2019–20 Indian Super League.

=== Mumbai City ===
On 22 October 2020, Mumbai City announced that they had signed Jahouh on a two-year deal.

On 21 November, Jahouh made his debut for the club in the Indian Super League against NorthEast United, in a narrow 1–0 defeat. It was a debut to forget as was sent off with a straight red, a couple of minutes before halftime for his studs-up challenge on Khassa Camara.

He won the Indian Super League Winners Shield and the Indian Super League title in his first season with the club, completing a domestic double.

Jahouh made his first appearance of the 2021–22 Indian Super League season, on 22 November 2021, against Goa, which ended in a resounding 3–0 win. Five days later, he scored his first goal for the club, against Hyderabad, in a 3–1 defeat. He opened the scoring with a thumping right-footed finish after the Hyderabad players failed to clear their lines inside the penalty area.

On 11 February, Jahouh signed a one-year contract extension, keeping him at the club until the end of the 2022–23 season. He registered three goals along with seven assists in 15 league appearances, as the Islanders finished on fifth place and failed to qualify for the playoffs.

He was later included in the club's 2022 AFC Champions League squad. He started in the club's AFC Champions League debut match, on 8 April, against Al Shabab which ended in a 3–0 defeat. Three days later, he was part of a historic 2–1 win against Al-Quwa Al-Jawiya, as Mumbai City became the first Indian club to win an AFC Champions League game. He provided the assist for the winning goal scored by Rahul Bheke.

=== Odisha ===
On 31 May 2023, Jahouh agreed a two-year transfer to Odisha. This was his fourth reunion with manager Sergio Lobera, having also played under him for Moghreb Tétouan, Goa and Mumbai City.

On 22 February 2025, midway through his second season at the club, Jahouh unilaterally left Odisha, without providing any reason or information to the club.

=== Return to Fath Nador ===
On 6 August 2025, Fath Nador announced the return of Jahouh, 17 years after he first left the club in 2008.

== International career ==
Jahouh has been capped at the international level, representing the team in 2012 Arab Nations Cup, where they defeated Libya in the final.

== Career statistics ==
=== Club ===
As of 6 February 2025

Appearances and goals by club, season and competition
Club	Season	League			National Cup (Note: Includes Super Cup, Moroccan Throne Cup)		Continental		Other		Total	
Club	Season	Division	Apps	Goals	Apps	Goals	Apps	Goals	Apps	Goals	Apps	Goals
Fath Nador	2006–07	GNFA 1					—		—			
Fath Nador	2007–08	GNFA 1					—		—			
Fath Nador	Total						—		—			
Ittihad Khemisset	2008–09	Botola					—		—			
Ittihad Khemisset	2009–10	Botola	13	1	0	0	—		—		13	1
Ittihad Khemisset	Total		13	1			—		—		13	1
Moghreb Tétouan	2010–11	Botola	20	1	1	0	—		—		21	1
Moghreb Tétouan	2011–12	Botola	26	3	0	0	—		—		26	3
Moghreb Tétouan	2012–13	Botola	0	0	0	0	—		—		0	0
Moghreb Tétouan	2013–14	Botola	28	3	0	0	—		—		28	3
Moghreb Tétouan	2014–15	Botola	25	2	0	0	7 (Note: Appearances in CAF Champions League)	2	1 (Note: Appearance in FIFA Club World Cup)	0	33	4
Moghreb Tétouan	Total		99	9	1	0	7	2	1	0	108	11
Al-Ittihad Kalba (loan)	2012–13	UAE Pro League	9	1	0	0	—		2 (Note: Appearances in UAE League Cup)	0	11	1
Raja CA	2015–16	Botola	14	2	3	2	—		—		17	4
FUS Rabat	2016–17	Botola	19	1	2	0	5 (Note: Three appearances in CAF Champions League, two appearances and one goal in CAF Confederation Cup)	1	—		26	2
Goa	2017–18	Indian Super League	19	0	—		—		—		19	0
Goa	2018–19	Indian Super League	20	0	0	0	—		—		20	0
Goa	2019–20	Indian Super League	17	1	0	0	—		—		17	1
Goa	Total		56	1	0	0	—		—		56	1
Mumbai City	2020–21	Indian Super League	20	0	—		—		—		20	0
Mumbai City	2021–22	Indian Super League	15	3	—		6 (Note: Appearance(s) in AFC Champions League)	0	—		21	3
Mumbai City	2022–23	Indian Super League	21	2	0	0	—		8 (Note: Seven appearances and one goal in Durand Cup, one appearance and one goal in play–offs for AFC Champions League)	2	29	4
Mumbai City	Total		56	5	0	0	6	0	8	2	70	7
Odisha	2023–24	Indian Super League	22	2	5	3	8 (Note: Appearance(s) in AFC Cup)	0	—		35	5
Odisha	2024–25	Indian Super League	16	1	0	0	—		—		16	1
Odisha	Total		38	3	5	3	8	0	0	0	51	6
Career total			304	23	9	5	26	3	11	2	350	33

=== International ===
Appearances and goals by national team and year
National team	Year	Apps	Goals
Morocco	2012	5	0
Morocco	2015	2	0
Morocco	2016	2	0
Total		9	0

== Honours ==
FC Goa

- Indian Super League League Winners Shield: 2019–20

Mumbai City

- Indian Super League League Winners Shield: 2020–21, 2022–23
- Indian Super League: 2020–21

Morocco

- FIFA Arab Cup: 2012
