= GMC Athletic Stadium =

Multi-purpose stadium in Bambolim, Goa, India

- Interactive map of GMC Athletic Stadium
- Location: Bambolim, Goa, India
- Coordinates: 15°28′4.95″N 73°51′44.65″E
- Owner: Sports Authority of Goa
- Capacity: 3,000
- Surface: Grass

Construction
- Opened: 2014
- Renovated: 2020
- Cost: $1 million

Tenants
- Churchill Brothers FC; SC de Goa; FC Goa Reserves and Academy; Goa Professional League

The GMC Athletic Stadium in Bambolim is the first integrated athletic complex in Goa. It has been constructed according to the IAAF specifications and norms and has hosted the athletic events of 2014 Lusofonia Games. The field has been used as the training ground for the FC Goa developmental squad. It was chosen as one of the three venues to host the 2020–21 of the Indian Super League.

== History ==
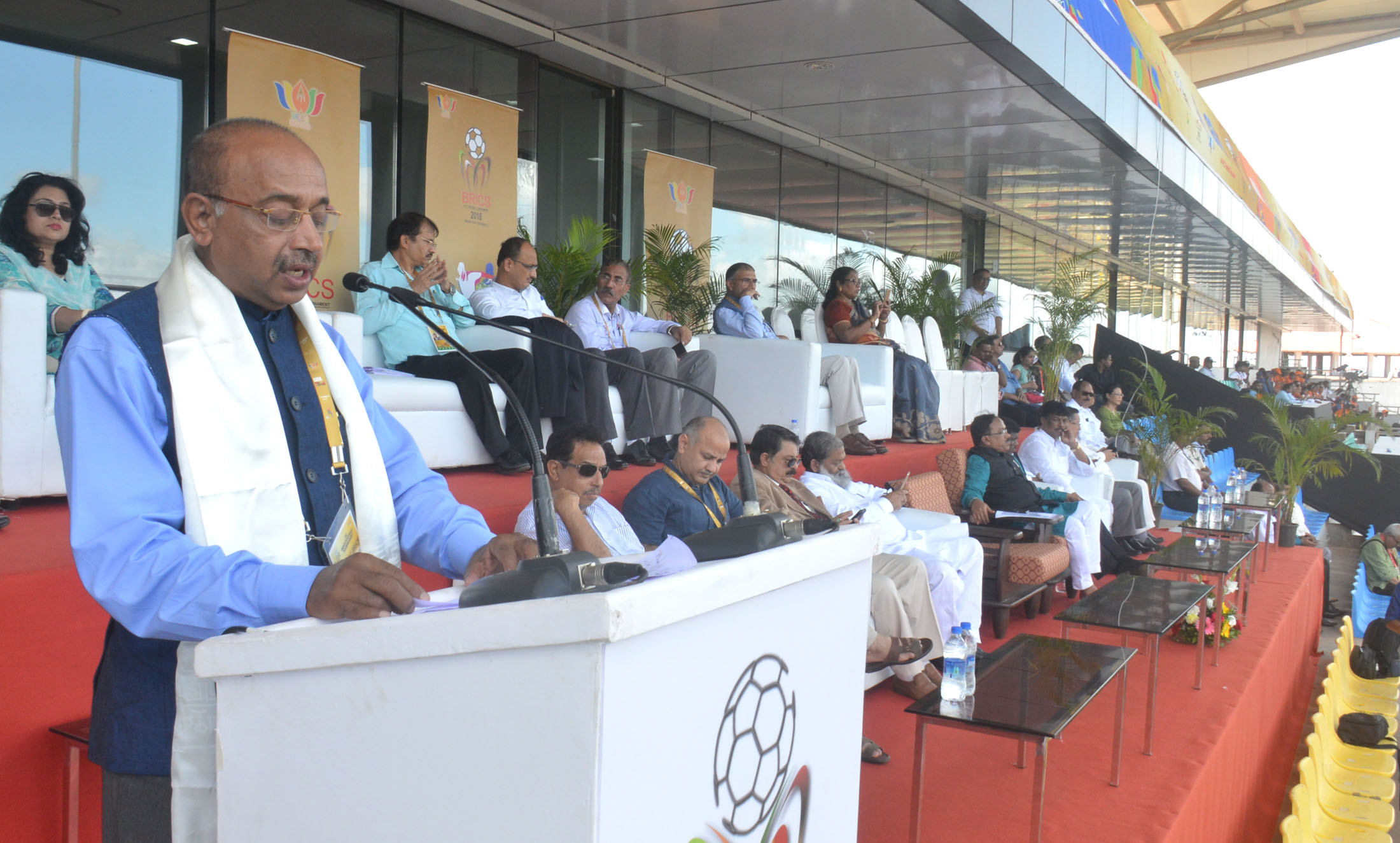
The stadium during the inauguration of first 2016 BRICS U-17 Football Cup, October 05, 2016.

GMC Stadium was opened in 2014 on the occasion of the 2014 Lusofonia Games, a multi-sport event held between athletes from Portuguese-speaking countries and territories. The stadium has been used as an athletic complex by the Sports Authority of Goa, as well as an association football venue for the Goa Professional League matches.

The stadium has also hosted the U-18 Y-League, U-15 Y-League, U-13 Y-League, Santosh Trophy and I-League games previously.

== Indian Super League ==
The stadium was the official home ground of Kerala Blasters FC, Mumbai City FC, Chennaiyin FC and Odisha FC for the 2020–21 Indian Super League season due to the COVID-19 outbreak in the country. The entire season was played in selected venues in close proximity to minimise any chance of outbreak in the bio-bubble.

== See also ==
- Fatorda Stadium
- Tilak Maidan Stadium
- Duler Stadium
