= Pranjal Banerjee =

Indian football referee (born 1986)

- Born: 21 April 1986 (age 40); Kolkata, West Bengal, India

Domestic
Years	League	Role

International
Years	League	Role
2014–Present (AFC Elite Referee since 2015)	FIFA listed	Referee

Pranjal Banerjee is an Indian professional football referee who officiates primarily the matches of both I-League and Indian Super League.

Banerjee was awarded 2016 All India Football Federation Referee of the Year.
