= Mourtada Fall =

Senegalese footballer (born 1987)

Personal information
- Full name: Sérigné Mourtada Fall
- Date of birth: 26 December 1987 (age 38)
- Place of birth: Dakar, Senegal
- Height: 1.91 m (6 ft 3 in)
- Position: Centre-back

Youth career
- Moghreb Tétouan

Senior career*
Years	Team	Apps	(Gls)
2007–2013	Moghreb Tétouan		
2013	Al-Arabi		
2013–2014	Al-Salmiya		
2014–2015	Moghreb Tétouan	27	(1)
2015–2017	Wydad AC	40	(2)
2017–2018	Moghreb Tétouan	17	(1)
2018–2020	Goa	40	(9)
2020–2023	Mumbai City	59	(8)
2023–2025	Odisha	41	(8)
- * Club domestic league appearances and goals as of 13:15, 23 February 2025 (UTC)

Sérigné Mourtada Fall (born 26 December 1987) is a Senegalese professional footballer who plays as a defender.

== Career ==
Regarded as a goalscoring defender, Fall became the highest scoring defender in the history of Indian Super League in 2021. Under his captaincy, the club began its 2021–22 season campaign with a 3–0 win on 22 November against FC Goa. Mumbai City finished the season on fifth place and failed to qualify for the playoffs. Ahead of the 2022 AFC Champions League kick-off, the club went to Abu Dhabi for training and defeated Emirati giants Al Ain 2–1 in a friendly match. He appeared in and captained the club's AFC Champions League debut match on 8 April against Saudi Arabian Al Shabab in a 3–0 defeat. In the next match on 11 April, Fall led Mumbai City registered their first win at the AFC Champions League, becoming the first Indian team to win a game in the competition, beating Iraqi Premier League champions Al-Quwa Al-Jawiya 2–1 at the King Fahd International Stadium.

== Career statistics ==
=== Club ===
As of 21 April 2025

Club	Season	League			National Cup (Note: Includes Moroccan Throne Cup, Super Cup)		Continental		Other		Total	
Club	Season	Division	Apps	Goals	Apps	Goals	Apps	Goals	Apps	Goals	Apps	Goals
Moghreb Tetuán
Moghreb Tetuán	2007–08	Botola	1	0			—		—		1	0
Moghreb Tetuán	2008–09	Botola					—		—			
Moghreb Tetuán	2009–10	Botola	11	1			—		—		11	1
Moghreb Tetuán	2010–11	Botola	11	1	1	0	—		—		12	1
Moghreb Tetuán	2011–12	Botola	26	0			—		—		26	0
Moghreb Tetuán	2012–13	Botola	4	0			—		—		4	0
Moghreb Tetuán	Total		53	2	0	0	—		—		54	2
Al-Arabi	2012–13	Kuwait Premier League					—		—			
Al-Salmiya	2013–14	Kuwait Premier League					—		—			
Moghreb Tetuán	2014–15	Botola	27	1	—		7 (Note: Appearances in CAF Champions League)	0	1 (Note: Appearance in FIFA Club World Cup)	0	35	2
Wydad AC	2015–16	Botola	29	2	—		6	0	—		35	2
Wydad AC	2016–17	Botola	11	0	1	0	7	0	—		19	0
Wydad AC	Total		40	2	1	0	13	0	—		54	2
Moghreb Tetuán	2017–18	Botola	17	1	0	0	—		—		17	1
Goa	2018–19	Indian Super League	21	4	3	0	—		—		24	4
Goa	2019–20	Indian Super League	19	5	0	0	—		—		19	5
Goa	Total		40	9	3	0	—		—		43	9
Mumbai City	2020–21	Indian Super League	22	4	—		—		—		22	4
Mumbai City	2021–22	Indian Super League	19	3	—		6 (Note: Appearance(s) in AFC Champions League)	0	—		25	3
Mumbai City	2022–23	Indian Super League	18	1	—		—		4 (Note: Appearance(s) in Durand Cup) (Note: Appearance in play-offs for AFC Cup)	0	22	1
Mumbai City	Total		59	8	0	0	6	0	4	0	69	8
Odisha	2023–24	Indian Super League	20	3	5	2	6 (Note: Appearance(s) in AFC Cup)	3	—		31	8
Odisha	2024–25	Indian Super League	21	5	1	0	—		—		22	5
Odisha	Total		41	8	6	2	6	3	0	0	53	13
Career total			277	31	11	2	32	3	5	0	325	36

== Honours ==
Moghreb Tétouan

- Botola: 2011–12

Goa

- Indian Super League Winners' Shield: 2019–20
- Super Cup: 2019

Mumbai City

- Indian Super League: 2020–21
- Indian Super League Winners' Shield: 2020–21, 2022–23
- Durand Cup runner-up: 2022
