= Hernán Santana =

Spanish footballer

Hernán
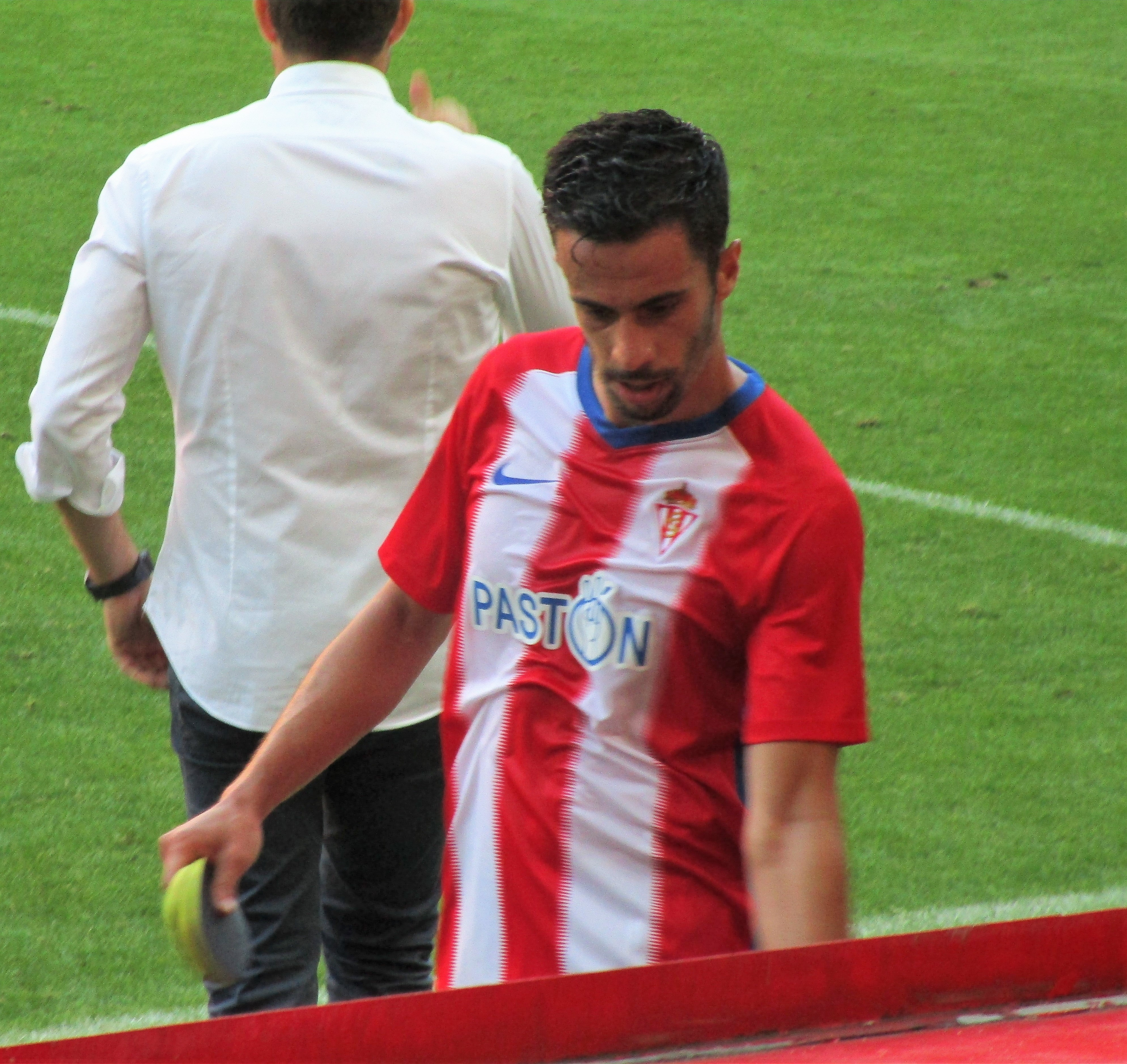
- Hernán with Sporting Gijón in 2018

Personal information
- Full name: Hernán Daniel Santana Trujillo
- Date of birth: 26 August 1990 (age 36)
- Place of birth: Breña Baja, Spain
- Height: 1.80 m (5 ft 11 in)
- Positions: Defensive midfielder; centre-back

Team information
- Current team: Panadería Pulido

Youth career
- San Juan Tres Palmas
- 2008–2010: Las Palmas

Senior career*
Years	Team	Apps	(Gls)
2010–2012	Las Palmas B	?	(8)
2011–2018	Las Palmas	107	(5)
2018–2021	Sporting Gijón	26	(2)
2020–2021	→ Mumbai City (loan)	19	(2)
2021–2022	NorthEast United	17	(1)
2022	Sichuan Jiuniu	20	(0)
2023	Goa	4	(0)
2023–2024	Mensajero	18	(0)
2025–	Panadería Pulido	10	(0)
- * Club domestic league appearances and goals as of 12:03, 15 June 2026 (UTC)

Hernán Daniel Santana Trujillo (born 26 August 1990), known simply as Hernán, is a Spanish professional footballer who plays as a defensive midfielder or a central defender for Tercera Federación club Panadería Pulido.

== Club career ==
=== Las Palmas ===
Born in Breña Baja, La Palma, Canary Islands, Hernán finished his development at UD Las Palmas. He made his debut as a senior with the reserves, in Tercera División.

Hernán played his first game as a professional on 12 February 2011, starting in a 5–0 away defeat against AD Alcorcón in the Segunda División. His second appearance came only on 1 October, in the 1–1 home draw with Real Murcia CF. In June 2012, he was definitely promoted to the first team.

Hernán scored his first goal in the second tier on 2 March 2013, in a 3–3 home draw against FC Barcelona B. He suffered a knee injury in August, being sparingly used during the campaign.

Hernán was an undisputed starter in 2014–15, featuring in 36 matches – play-offs included – and netting three times as the Amarillos returned to La Liga after a 13-year absence. On 1 July 2015, he signed a new three-year contract until 2018.

On 22 August 2015, Hernán made his debut in the Spanish top flight, in a 1–0 defeat at Atlético Madrid. He scored for the only time in the competition on 31 October of the same year, but in a 3–1 away loss to Real Madrid.

=== Sporting Gijón ===
On 26 January 2018, Hernán signed with Sporting de Gijón until the end of the second-tier season and three more. On 25 October 2020, he was loaned to Mumbai City FC of the Indian Super League. He started in all but one of his appearances for the latter, as they clinched their maiden league title.

=== NorthEast United ===
Hernán joined NorthEast United FC on 10 September 2021, on a two-year contract. He made his debut for the club on 20 November against Bengaluru FC in a 4–2 loss. He scored his only goal the following 14 January, opening the 1–1 draw at FC Goa.

=== Sichuan Jiuniu ===
Hernán moved to Sichuan Jiuniu F.C. from the China League One on 18 April 2022.

== Honours ==
Mumbai City

- Indian Super League: 2020–21
