= Mandar Rao Dessai =

Indian footballer (born 1992)

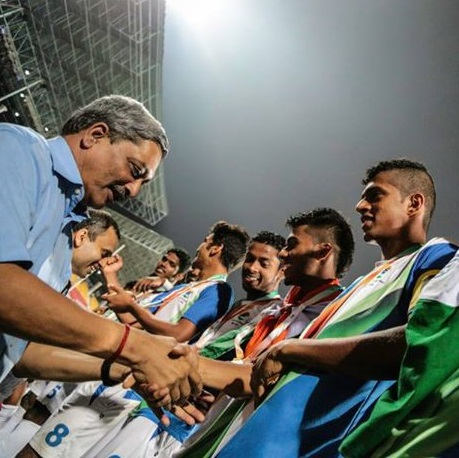
- Dessai shaking hands with Manohar Parrikar at the 2014 Lusofonia Games

Personal information
- Full name: Mandar Rao Dattarao Dessai
- Date of birth: 18 March 1992 (age 34)
- Place of birth: Mapusa, Goa, India
- Height: 1.72 m (5 ft 8 in)
- Position: Left-back

Youth career
- Dempo

Senior career*
Years	Team	Apps	(Gls)
2013–2016	Dempo	30	(3)
2014	→ Goa (loan)	11	(0)
2015	→ Goa (loan)	15	(3)
2016–2020	Goa	71	(3)
2016–2017	→ Bengaluru (loan)	9	(1)
2020–2023	Mumbai City	41	(0)
2023–2024	East Bengal	17	(0)
2024–2026	Chennaiyin	25	(0)

International career^{‡}
2014	India U20	4	(1)
2015	India U23	1	(0)
2019–2021	India	9	(0)
Medal record
Men's football
Representing India
SAFF Championship
Winner	2021 Maldives
- * Club domestic league appearances and goals as of 16:33, 6 March 2024 (UTC) ‡ National team caps and goals as of 16 October 2021

Mandar Rao Dessai (born 18 March 1992) is an Indian professional footballer who plays as a left-back.

== Career ==
=== Dempo ===
Desai made his professional debut for Dempo in the 2013-14 I-League on 22 September 2013 against Shillong Lajong at the Duler Stadium and played the match till 55th minute before he was replaced by Jeje Lalpekhlua as his team lost the match 0–3.

==== Goa (loan) ====
Mandar represented Goa in the 2014 Indian Super League, on loan from Dempo, and was a regular for his team on the left wing.

=== Return to Dempo ===
After the 2014 ISL, Mandar returned to his senior club and started the new season in the 2014–15 Indian Federation Cup, where he played in 5 of his teams' cup-winning campaign, assisting Tolgay Ozbey once in a group game. While he was regular for Dempo during the 2014–15 I-League, he could not prevent his team from getting relegated. He made 14 appearances, with only 5 starts in the league.

==== Goa (loan) ====
Mandar was retained by Goa for the 2015 Indian Super League with Zico impressed by him from the 2014 season. He started and scored in the first game of the season against Roberto Carlos lead northern outfit Delhi Dynamos from a Romeo Fernandes assist as his team won 2–0. He scored again in a round 4 game away at Guwahati against NorthEast United after coming on as a substitute, from a swift counterattack, showing his impressive pace. Mandar then turned in his first assist of the season at home against Kerala Blasters from a corner, assisting Gregory Arnolin with a goal that turned out be the winner. He won Hero of the Match awards for his performances against Delhi Dynamos and Pune City in 2015 Indian Super League. Mandar scored his 3rd goal of the season against Kerala Blasters in a 1–5 win at Kochi on 29 November 2015, where he also assisted Reinaldo for the 3rd goal.

=== Return to Dempo ===
After contractual problems, Mandar returned to play for Dempo, where he had a contract until the end of the 2015–16 season where he helped his team win promotion back to the I-League.

=== Goa ===
Desai signed a permanent deal with Goa from the 2016 Indian Super League. He later went to Spain for a short training cum trial stint with La Liga side Villarreal CF.

=== Mumbai City ===
In 2020, Dessai moved to Mumbai City and emerged champions of the 2020–21 season. He was later included in club's 2022 AFC Champions League squad.

== International ==
Mandar captained Goa-India during the 2014 Lusophony Games where he made 4 appearances and scored once, as he led his team to the gold medal, beating the under-20 team of Mozambique in the final.

Mandar made his India U23 debut in the 2014 Asian Games against UAE U23.

== Personal life ==
Mandar was in a relationship with Danish footballer Cecilie Bjørnstrup Andersen, from 2018 until their separation in 2021. They have a daughter namely Aya and son called Adrian.

== Career statistics ==
=== Club ===
As of 6 March 2024

Club	Season	League			Cup		Continental		Total	
Club	Season	Division	Apps	Goals	Apps	Goals	Apps	Goals	Apps	Goals
Dempo	2013–14	I-League	6	0	0	0	—		6	0
Dempo	2014–15	I-League	14	0	1 (Note: Appearance(s) in Federation Cup)	0	—		15	0
Dempo	2015–16	I-League 2nd Division	10	3	—		—		10	3
Dempo	Total		30	3	1	0	—		31	3
Goa (loan)	2014	Indian Super League	11	0	—		—		11	0
Goa (loan)	2015	Indian Super League	15	2	—		—		15	2
Goa	2016	Indian Super League	12	1	—		—		12	1
Goa	2017–18	Indian Super League	20	2	3 (Note: Appearance(s) in Super Cup)	0	—		23	2
Goa	2018–19	Indian Super League	19	0	0	0	—		23	0
Goa	2019–20	Indian Super League	20	0	—		—		20	0
Goa	Total		97	5	3	0	—		100	5
Bengaluru (loan)	2016–17	I-League	9	1	0	0	2 (Note: Appearance(s) in AFC Cup)	0	11	1
Mumbai City	2020–21	Indian Super League	17	0	—		—		17	0
Mumbai City	2021–22	Indian Super League	14	0	—		5 (Note: Appearance(s) in AFC Champions League)	0	19	0
Mumbai City	2022–23	Indian Super League	10	0	6 (Note: Appearance(s) in Durand Cup)	0	1 (Note: Appearance(s) in AFC Champions League qualifiers)	0	17	0
Mumbai City	Total		41	0	6	0	6	0	53	0
East Bengal	2023–24	Indian Super League	17	0	7	0	—		24	0
Chennaiyin	2024–25	Indian Super League	0	0	—		—		0	0
Career total			190	9	16	0	8	0	214	9

=== International ===
As of 16 October 2021

National team	Year	Apps	Goals
India	2019	5	0
India	2021	4	0
Total		9	0

== Honours ==
Dempo

- I-League 2nd Division: 2015–16

Goa

- ISL League Winners Shield: 2019–20
- Super Cup: 2019

Mumbai City

- Indian Super League: 2020–21
- ISL League Winners Shield: 2020–21
- ISL League Winners Shield: 2022–23

East Bengal

- Super Cup: 2024
- Durand Cup Runner Up: 2023

India

- SAFF Championship: 2021

India U20 (Goa India)

- Lusofonia Games Gold medal: 2014
