= 2020–21 Indian Super League =

7th season of the Hero Indian Super League

Indian Super League
- League announcement poster
- Season: 2020–21
- Dates: 20 November 2020 – 13 March 2021
- Champions: Mumbai City; 1st ISL Cup title 1st Indian title
- League Winners' Shield: Mumbai City; 1st ISL Shield title
- AFC Champions League: Mumbai City
- AFC Cup: Mohun Bagan
- Matches: 115
- Goals: 298 (2.59 per match)
- Top goalscorer: Igor Angulo; Roy Krishna (14 goals each)
- Best goalkeeper: Arindam Bhattacharya (108.95 mins per goal)
- Biggest home win: Hyderabad 4–0 Kerala Blasters (16 February 2021)
- Biggest away win: Odisha 1–6 Mumbai City (24 February 2021)
- Highest scoring: Odisha 6–5 East Bengal (27 February 2021)
- Longest winning run: Mohun Bagan (5 games)
- Longest unbeaten run: Goa (15 games)
- Longest winless run: Odisha (10 games)
- Longest losing run: Bengaluru, Odisha (4 games)

The 2020–21 Indian Super League season was the seventh season of the Indian Super League (ISL) since its formation and the 25th season of the top division of the Indian football league system. The season started on 20 November 2020 and ended on 13 March 2021. It was hosted behind closed doors across three venues in Goa due to the COVID-19 pandemic in India.

Mumbai City won the trophy, having defeated Mohun Bagan in the final, and also won the League Winners Shield. Thus, Mumbai City became the first club to win, both, the ISL trophy, and League Winners Shield, within the same season.

== Changes from last season ==
- Each club had the option of signing a minimum of five and a maximum of seven foreign players. Still, unlike the previous season, there should be at least one overseas player who hails from an AFC–affiliated country.
- The maximum squad size was increased as the clubs were allowed to register up to 35 players in their squad.
- The number of substitutions allowed, was increased from 3 players to 5 players.
- Due to the COVID-19 pandemic, all matches during the 2020–21 season was played behind closed doors across three venues in Goa. The venues were the Fatorda Stadium in Margao, GMC Athletic Stadium in Bambolim, and Tilak Maidan Stadium in Vasco da Gama. The host venues for each team were revealed on 18 August 2020.
- In June–July 2020, KGSPL, the owners of ATK, officially disbanded their football team and bought a majority stake in Mohun Bagan FC (India) Private Limited and rebranded Mohun Bagan football section as ATK Mohun Bagan which took the spot of ATK
- On 27 September 2020, East Bengal joined the league as an expansion team and thus became the 11th team.
- Since all the matches were played in neutral venues, there was no away goal rule applied in the playoffs this season.

== Teams ==
=== Stadiums and locations ===
Locations of the Indian Super League teams

Team	Location	Host venue	Capacity
ATK Mohun Bagan	Kolkata, West Bengal	Fatorda Stadium	18,600
Bengaluru	Bangalore, Karnataka	Fatorda Stadium	18,600
Goa	Margao, Goa	Fatorda Stadium	18,600
Chennaiyin	Chennai, Tamil Nadu	GMC Athletic Stadium	3,000
Kerala Blasters	Kochi, Kerala	GMC Athletic Stadium	3,000
Mumbai City	Mumbai, Maharashtra	GMC Athletic Stadium	3,000
Odisha	Bhubaneswar, Odisha	GMC Athletic Stadium	3,000
SC East Bengal	Kolkata, West Bengal	Tilak Maidan Stadium	5,000
Hyderabad	Hyderabad, Telangana	Tilak Maidan Stadium	5,000
Jamshedpur	Jamshedpur, Jharkhand	Tilak Maidan Stadium	5,000
NorthEast United	Guwahati, Assam	Tilak Maidan Stadium	5,000

Locations of the stadiums in Goa

=== Personnel and sponsorship ===
Team	Head coach	Captain(s)	Kit manufacturer	Main sponsor
ATK Mohun Bagan	(Spain) Antonio López Habas	(India) Pritam Kotal; (Fiji) Roy Krishna; (India) Sandesh Jhingan; (India) Arindam Bhattacharya; (Spain) Edu Garcia (Note: Coach Habas announced five players will be given the captain's armband in rotation.)	Nivia	SBOTOP
Bengaluru	(India) Naushad Moosa (interim head coach)	(India) Sunil Chhetri	Puma	JSW
Chennaiyin	(Hungary) Csaba László	(Brazil) Rafael Crivellaro	Performax	Apollo Tyres
East Bengal	(England) Robbie Fowler	(Scotland) Danny Fox	TYKA	Shree Cement
Goa	(Spain) Juan Ferrando	(Spain) Edu Bedia	SIX5SIX	Indinews
Hyderabad	(Spain) Manuel Roca	(Spain) Aridane Santana	T10 Sports	Andslite
Jamshedpur	(Scotland) Owen Coyle	(England) Peter Hartley	Nivia	Tata Steel
Kerala Blasters	(India) Ishfaq Ahmed (interim head coach)	(Zimbabwe) Costa Nhamoinesu; (India) Jessel Carneiro	Reyaur Sports	BYJU'S
Mumbai City	(Spain) Sergio Lobera	(India) Amrinder Singh	Puma	DafaNews
NorthEast United	(India) Khalid Jamil (Interim head coach)	(Belgium) Benjamin Lambot; (India) Lalengmawia; (Uruguay) Federico Gallego; (India) Subhasish Roy Chowdhury	Performax	JA Entertainment
Odisha	(Republic of Ireland) Gerry Peyton (Interim head coach)	(England) Steven Taylor	T10 Sports	Odisha Tourism

=== Managerial changes ===
Team	Outgoing manager	Manner of departure	Date of vacancy	Ref.	Position in table	Incoming manager	Date of appointment	Ref.
Kerala Blasters	(Netherlands) Eelco Schattorie	Sacked	22 April 2020		Pre-season	(Spain) Kibu Vicuña	23 April 2020	
Goa	(India) Clifford Miranda	End of interim period	30 April 2020		Pre-season	(Spain) Juan Ferrando	30 April 2020	
Hyderabad	(Spain) Xavier Gurri López	End of interim period	1 June 2020		Pre-season	(Spain) Albert Roca	1 June 2020	
Odisha	(Spain) Josep Gombau	Mutual consent	18 March 2020		Pre-season	(Scotland) Stuart Baxter	19 June 2020	
Jamshedpur	(Spain) Antonio Iriondo	End of contract	31 May 2020		Pre-season	(Scotland) Owen Coyle	7 August 2020	
NorthEast United	(India) Khalid Jamil	End of the interim period	25 August 2020		Pre-season	(Spain) Gerard Nus	25 August 2020	
Chennaiyin	(Scotland) Owen Coyle	End of contract	14 March 2020		Pre-season	(Hungary) Csaba László	30 August 2020	
Hyderabad	(Spain) Albert Roca	Mutual consent	29 August 2020		Pre-season	(Spain) Manuel Roca	31 August 2020	
Mumbai City	(Portugal) Jorge Costa	End of contract	5 March 2020		Pre-season	(Spain) Sergio Lobera	12 October 2020	
Bengaluru	(Spain) Carles Cuadrat	Mutual consent	6 January 2021		5th	(India) Naushad Moosa	6 January 2021	
NorthEast United	(Spain) Gerard Nus	Sacked	12 January 2021		7th	(India) Khalid Jamil	12 January 2021	
Odisha	(Scotland) Stuart Baxter	Sacked	2 February 2021		11th	(Republic of Ireland) Gerry Peyton	3 February 2021	
Kerala Blasters	(Spain) Kibu Vicuna	Sacked	17 February 2021		9th	(India) Ishfaq Ahmed	17 February 2021	

== Foreign players ==
Bold letters suggest the player was signed in the winter transfer window.

Club	Player 1	Player 2	Player 3	Player 4	Player 5	Player 6	AFC Player	Former Player
ATK Mohun Bagan	(Brazil) Marcelinho	(Fiji) Roy Krishna	(Republic of Ireland) Carl McHugh	(Spain) Edu García	(Spain) Javi Hernández	(Spain) Tiri	(Australia) David Williams	(Australia) Brad Inman
Bengaluru	(Brazil) Cleiton Silva	(Norway) Kristian Opseth	(Spain) Dimas Delgado	(Spain) Fran González	(Spain) Juanan	(Spain) Xisco Hernández	(Australia) Erik Paartalu	(Jamaica) Deshorn Brown
Chennaiyin	(Bosnia and Herzegovina) Enes Sipović	(Brazil) Eli Sabiá	(Brazil) Memo	(Guinea-Bissau) Esmaël Gonçalves	(Slovakia) Jakub Sylvestr	(Spain) Manuel Lanzarote	(Tajikistan) Fatkhullo Fatkhuloev	(Brazil) Rafael Crivellaro
East Bengal	(Democratic Republic of the Congo) Jacques Maghoma	(Germany) Matti Steinmann	(Nigeria) Bright Enobakhare	(Republic of Ireland) Anthony Pilkington	(Scotland) Danny Fox	(Wales) Aaron Holloway	(Australia) Scott Neville	
Goa	(Spain) Alberto Noguera	(Spain) Edu Bedia	(Spain) Igor Angulo	(Spain) Iván González	(Spain) Jorge Ortiz		(Australia) James Donachie	
Hyderabad	(Brazil) João Victor	(Spain) Aridane Santana	(Spain) Fran Sandaza	(Spain) Lluís Sastre	(Spain) Odei Onaindia	(Suriname) Roland Alberg	(Australia) Joel Chianese	
Jamshedpur	(Brazil) Alex Monteiro	(England) Peter Hartley	(Lithuania) Nerijus Valskis	(Nigeria) Stephen Eze	(Spain) Aitor Monroy	(Spain) David Grande	(Australia) Nick Fitzgerald	
Kerala Blasters	(Argentina) Facundo Pereyra	(Burkina Faso) Bakary Koné	(England) Gary Hooper	(Spain) Juande	(Spain) Vicente Gómez	(Zimbabwe) Costa Nhamoinesu	(Australia) Jordan Murray	(Spain) Sergio Cidoncha
Mumbai City	(England) Adam Le Fondre	(France) Hugo Boumous	(Morocco) Ahmed Jahouh	(Nigeria) Bartholomew Ogbeche	(Senegal) Mourtada Fall	(Spain) Hernán Santana	(Japan) Cy Goddard	
NorthEast United	(Belgium) Benjamin Lambot	(Guinea) Idrissa Sylla	(Jamaica) Deshorn Brown	(Mauritania) Khassa Camara	(Portugal) Luís Machado	(Uruguay) Federico Gallego	(Australia) Dylan Fox	(Ghana) Kwesi Appiah
Odisha	(Australia) Brad Inman	(Brazil) Diego Maurício	(England) Steven Taylor	(South Africa) Cole Alexander	(Spain) Manuel Onwu	(Senegal) Diawandou Diagne	(Australia) Jacob Tratt	(Brazil) Marcelinho

== Regular season ==
=== League table ===
Pos	Team	Pld	W	D	L	GF	GA	GD	Pts	Qualification
1	Mumbai City (L, C)	20	12	4	4	35	18	+17	40	Qualification to ISL playoffs and 2022 AFC Champions League group stage
2	ATK Mohun Bagan (Note: As the Premiers Mumbai City won the ISL playoffs, the regular season runners-up qualified for 2022 AFC Cup play-off round.)	20	12	4	4	28	15	+13	40	Qualification to ISL playoffs and 2022 AFC Cup play-off round
3	NorthEast United	20	8	9	3	31	25	+6	33	Qualification to ISL playoffs
4	Goa	20	7	10	3	31	23	+8	31	Qualification to ISL playoffs
5	Hyderabad	20	6	11	3	27	19	+8	29	
6	Jamshedpur	20	7	6	7	21	22	−1	27	
7	Bengaluru	20	5	7	8	26	28	−2	22	
8	Chennaiyin	20	3	11	6	17	23	−6	20	
9	East Bengal	20	3	8	9	22	33	−11	17	
10	Kerala Blasters	20	3	8	9	23	36	−13	17	
11	Odisha	20	2	6	12	25	44	−19	12	

Source: Indian Super League
Rules for classification: 1) points; 2) head-to-head points; 3) head-to-head goal difference; 4) head-to-head goals scored; 5) goal difference; 6) number of goals scored; 7) fair play ranking; 8) drawing of lots
(C) Champions; (L) League Winners' Shield Winners

=== Results ===
Home \ Away	AMB	BEN	CHE	EAB	GOA	HYD	JAM	KER	MCI	NEU	OFC
ATK Mohun Bagan	—	1–0	1–0	3–1	1–0	1–1	1–0	3–2	0–1	2–0	1–0
Bengaluru	0–2	—	0–0	0–1	1–2	0–0	0–1	4–2	1–3	2–2	1–1
Chennaiyin	0–0	0–1	—	0–0	2–2	1–4	0–1	0–0	1–1	3–3	0–0
East Bengal	0–2	0–2	2–2	—	1–1	1–1	0–0	1–1	0–1	1–2	3–1
Goa	1–1	2–2	1–2	1–1	—	0–0	3–0	3–1	0–1	1–1	3–1
Hyderabad	2–2	2–2	2–0	3–2	1–2	—	1–1	4–0	0–2	0–0	1–1
Jamshedpur	2–1	3–2	1–2	1–2	1–2	0–0	—	2–3	2–0	1–2	2–2
Kerala Blasters	0–1	2–1	1–1	1–1	1–1	2–0	0–0	—	1–2	2–2	2–4
Mumbai City	2–0	2–4	2–1	3–0	3–3	1–1	1–1	2–0	—	1–2	2–0
NorthEast United	2–1	1–1	0–0	2–0	2–2	2–4	0–1	2–0	1–0	—	3–1
Odisha	1–4	1–2	1–2	6–5	0–1	0–1	0–1	2–2	1–6	2–2	—

Source: Indian Super League
Legend: Blue = home team win; Yellow = draw; Red = away team win.

== Playoffs ==
=== Bracket ===
Semi-finals
1	Mumbai City (p)	2	0	2 (6)
4	Goa	2	0	2 (5)
2	ATK Mohun Bagan	1	2	3
3	NorthEast United	1	1	2

Final
1	Mumbai City	2
2	ATK Mohun Bagan	1

=== Semi-finals ===
Team 1	Agg.	Team 2	1st leg	2nd leg
Mumbai City	2–2 (6–5 p)	Goa	2–2	0–0 (a.e.t.)
ATK Mohun Bagan	3–2	NorthEast United	1–1	2–1

=== Final ===
13 March 2021
19:30 IST

Mumbai City	2–1	ATK Mohun Bagan
Tiri 29' (o.g.); B. Singh 90'	Report	Williams 18'

Fatorda Stadium, Margao
Attendance: 0
Referee: Tejas Nagvenkar (India)

== Season statistics ==
=== Scoring ===
==== Top scorers ====
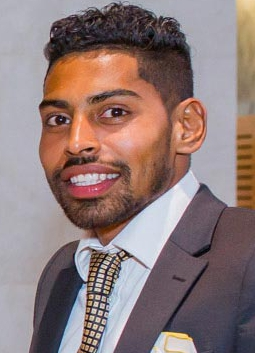
Roy Krishna scored 14 goals in 2020–21 ISL season, joint highest goal scorer of the season.

Rank	Player	Club	Goals
1	(Spain) Igor Angulo	Goa	14
1	(Fiji) Roy Krishna	ATK Mohun Bagan	14
3	(England) Adam Le Fondre	Mumbai City	11
4	(Spain) Aridane Santana	Hyderabad	10
5	(Nigeria) Bartholomew Ogbeche	Mumbai City	8
5	(Lithuania) Nerijus Valskis	Jamshedpur	8
5	(India) Sunil Chhetri	Bengaluru	8
8	(Australia) Jordan Murray	Kerala Blasters	7
8	(Brazil) Diego Mauricio	Odisha	7
8	(Portugal) Luís Machado	NorthEast United	7

==== Top Indian scorers ====
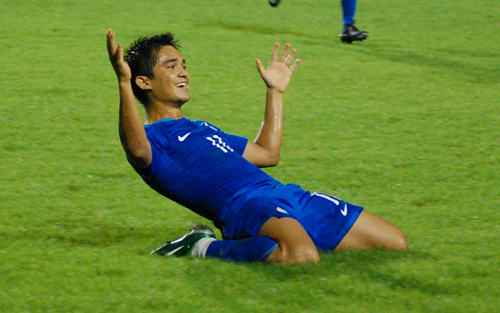
Sunil Chhetri scored 8 goals, highest Indian goalscorer of this season.

Rank	Player	Club	Goals
1	Sunil Chhetri	Bengaluru	8
2	Manvir Singh	ATK Mohun Bagan	6
2	Bipin Singh	Mumbai City	6
4	Ishan Pandita	Goa	4
4	Halicharan Narzary	Hyderabad	4
4	Lallianzuala Chhangte	Chennaiyin	4
7	Rahul KP	Kerala Blasters	3
7	V.P. Suhair	NorthEast United	3
9	Paul Ramfangzauva	Odisha	2
9	Anirudh Thapa	Chennaiyin	2
9	Liston Colaco	Hyderabad	2
9	Rahim Ali	Chennaiyin	2
9	Jerry Mawihmingthanga	Odisha	2
9	Rowllin Borges	Mumbai City	2

==== Hat-tricks ====
Result column shows goal tally of player's team first.

Player	For	Against	Result	Date	Ref
(India) Bipin Singh	Mumbai City	Odisha	6–1 (A)	24 February 2021	

Notes

(H) – Home team
(A) – Away team

=== Assists ===
Rank	Player	Club	Assists
1	(Spain) Alberto Noguera	Goa	8
1	(Fiji) Roy Krishna	ATK Mohun Bagan	8
3	(France) Hugo Boumous	Mumbai City	7
4	(Uruguay) Federico Gallego	NorthEast United	6
4	(Spain) Aitor Monroy	Jamshedpur	6
6	(India) Jerry Mawihmingthanga	Odisha	5
6	(Morocco) Ahmed Jahouh	Mumbai City	5
8	(England) Gary Hooper	Kerala Blasters	4
8	(India) Alexander Jesuraj	Goa	4
8	(Brazil) Cleiton Silva	Bengaluru	4
8	(India) Bipin Singh	Mumbai City	4

=== Clean sheets ===
Rank	Player	Club	Clean sheets
1	(India) Amrinder Singh	Mumbai City	10
1	(India) Arindam Bhattacharya	ATK Mohun Bagan	10
3	(India) Rehenesh TP	Jamshedpur	8
4	(India) Laxmikant Kattimani	Hyderabad	6
4	(India) Vishal Kaith	Chennaiyin	6
6	(India) Gurpreet Singh	Bengaluru	4
7	(India) Subhasish Roy	NorthEast United	3
7	(India) Albino Gomes	Kerala Blasters	3
9	(India) Gurmeet Singh	NorthEast United	2
9	(India) Dheeraj Singh	Goa	2
9	(India) Subrata Pal	East Bengal	2
9	(India) Debjit Majumder	East Bengal	2

=== Discipline ===
==== Player ====
- Most yellow cards: 8
  - (India) Pronay Halder (ATK Mohun Bagan)
  - (Australia) Erik Paartalu (Bengaluru)
- Most red cards: 2
  - (Morocco) Ahmed Jahouh (Mumbai City)

==== Club ====
- Most yellow cards: 61
  - Mumbai City
- Most red cards: 4
  - East Bengal
  - Jamshedpur
  - Goa

== Awards ==
=== Hero of the Match ===
Match	Hero of the Match		Match	Hero of the Match		Match	Hero of the Match	
Match	Player	Club	Match	Player	Club	Match	Player	Club
Match 1	(Fiji) Roy Krishna	ATK Mohun Bagan	Match 40	(India) Jeakson Singh	Kerala Blasters	Match 78	(Fiji) Roy Krishna	ATK Mohun Bagan
Match 2	(Mauritania) Khassa Camara	NorthEast United	Match 41	(India) Rehenesh TP	Jamshedpur	Match 79	(India) Seiminlen Doungel	Jamshedpur
Match 3	(Spain) Igor Angulo	Goa	Match 42	(India) Arindam Bhattacharya	ATK Mohun Bagan	Match 80	(India) Sunil Chhetri	Bengaluru
Match 4	(Spain) Aridane Santana	Hyderabad	Match 43	(Spain) Igor Angulo	Goa	Match 81	(India) Amrinder Singh	Mumbai City
Match 5	(India) Anirudh Thapa	Chennaiyin	Match 44	(India) Amrinder Singh	Mumbai City	Match 82	(Uruguay) Federico Gallego	NorthEast United
Match 6	(England) Adam Le Fondre	Mumbai City	Match 45	(Republic of Ireland) Anthony Pilkington	East Bengal	Match 83	(India) Gurpreet Singh	Bengaluru
Match 7	(Australia) Dylan Fox	NorthEast United	Match 46	(Fiji) Roy Krishna	ATK Mohun Bagan	Match 84	(India) Manvir Singh	ATK Mohun Bagan
Match 8	(Republic of Ireland) Carl McHugh	ATK Mohun Bagan	Match 47	(India) Halicharan Narzary	Hyderabad	Match 85	(Germany) Matti Steinmann	East Bengal
Match 9	(India) Chinglensana Singh	Hyderabad	Match 48	(India) Bipin Singh	Mumbai City	Match 86	(India) Lalengmawia	NorthEast United
Match 10	(Brazil) Diego Maurício	Odisha	Match 49	(Nigeria) Bright Enobakhare	East Bengal	Match 87	(India) Rowllin Borges	Mumbai City
Match 11	(India) Albino Gomes	Kerala Blasters	Match 50	(Brazil) Diego Maurício	Odisha	Match 88	(Brazil) Marcelinho Leite Pereira	ATK Mohun Bagan
Match 12	(India) Lalengmawia	NorthEast United	Match 51	(Australia) Joel Chianese	Hyderabad	Match 89	(Nigeria) Stephen Eze	Jamshedpur
Match 13	(France) Hugo Boumous	Mumbai City	Match 52	(India) Debjit Majumder	East Bengal	Match 90	(Brazil) Diego Mauricio	Odisha
Match 14	(India) Mohammad Yasir	Hyderabad	Match 53	(India) Lallianzuala Chhangte	Chennaiyin	Match 91	(India) Akash Mishra	Hyderabad
Match 15	(Fiji) Roy Krishna	ATK Mohun Bagan	Match 54	(Australia) Jordan Murray	Kerala Blasters	Match 92	(India) Ishan Pandita	Goa
Match 16	(India) Suresh Singh Wangjam	Bengaluru	Match 55	(Nigeria) Bartholomew Ogbeche	Mumbai City	Match 93	(Uruguay) Federico Gallego	NorthEast United
Match 17	(Belgium) Benjamin Lambot	NorthEast United	Match 56	(India) Lalengmawia	NorthEast United	Match 94	(Fiji) Roy Krishna	ATK Mohun Bagan
Match 18	(India) Rowllin Borges	Mumbai City	Match 57	(India) Anirudh Thapa	Chennaiyin	Match 95	(India) Sunil Chhetri	Bengaluru
Match 19	(India) Lenny Rodrigues	Goa	Match 58	(India) Naveen Kumar	Goa	Match 96	(Spain) Aridane Santana	Hyderabad
Match 20	(Lithuania) Nerijus Valskis	Jamshedpur	Match 59	(India) Sahal	Kerala Blasters	Match 97	(Spain) Iván González	Goa
Match 21	(Portugal) Luís Machado	NorthEast United	Match 60	(India) Hitesh Sharma	Hyderabad	Match 98	(India) Lallianzuala Chhangte	Chennaiyin
Match 22	(Senegal) Mourtada Fall	Mumbai City	Match 61	(Uruguay) Federico Gallego	NorthEast United	Match 99	(Fiji) Roy Krishna	ATK Mohun Bagan
Match 23	(India) Mohammed Irshad	East Bengal	Match 62	(India) Saviour Gama	Goa	Match 100	(India) Farukh Choudhary	Jamshedpur
Match 24	(India) Liston Colaco	Hyderabad	Match 63	(India) Debjit Majumder	East Bengal	Match 101	(India) Glan Martins	Goa
Match 25	(Spain) Jorge Ortiz	Goa	Match 64	(South Africa) Cole Alexander	Odisha	Match 102	(India) Lallianzuala Chhangte	Chennaiyin
Match 26	(Mauritania) Khassa Camara	NorthEast United	Match 65	(India) Rahul K P	Kerala Blasters	Match 103	(Spain) Aridane Santana	Hyderabad
Match 27	(Spain) Dimas Delgado	Bengaluru	Match 66	(Australia) David Williams	ATK Mohun Bagan	Match 104	(India) V.P. Suhair	NorthEast United
Match 28	(England) Peter Hartley	Jamshedpur	Match 67	(Senegal) Mourtada Fall	Mumbai City	Match 105	(India) Bipin Singh	Mumbai City
Match 29	(Spain) Aridane Santana	Hyderabad	Match 68	(India) Sandeep Singh	Kerala Blasters	Match 106	(Spain) Aitor Monroy	Jamshedpur
Match 30	(Republic of Ireland) Carl McHugh	ATK Mohun Bagan	Match 69	(Spain) Aridane Santana	Hyderabad	Match 107	(India) Lalengmawia	NorthEast United
Match 31	(Brazil) Cleiton Silva	Bengaluru	Match 70	(Brazil) Cleiton Silva	Bengaluru	Match 108	(India) Paul Ramfangzauva	Odisha
Match 32	(England) Peter Hartley	Jamshedpur	Match 71	(India) Amey Ranawade	Mumbai City	Match 109	(India) Adil Khan	Goa
Match 33	(Brazil) Rafael Crivellaro	Chennaiyin	Match 72	(Uruguay) Federico Gallego	NorthEast United	Match 110	(Senegal) Mourtada Fall	Mumbai City
Match 34	(Morocco) Ahmed Jahouh	Mumbai City	Match 73	(India) Sahal	Kerala Blasters	Match 111 (SF)	(Spain) Jorge Ortiz	Goa
Match 35	(Republic of Ireland) Anthony Pilkington	East Bengal	Match 74	(Spain) Aridane Santana	Hyderabad	Match 112 (SF)	(India) Gurjinder Kumar	NorthEast United
Match 36	(Australia) David Williams	ATK Mohun Bagan	Match 75	(Nigeria) Bright Enobakhare	East Bengal	Match 113 (SF)	(Spain) Iván González	Goa
Match 37	(South Africa) Cole Alexander	Odisha	Match 76	(Jamaica) Deshorn Brown	NorthEast United	Match 114 (SF)	(India) Manvir Singh	ATK Mohun Bagan
Match 38	(Spain) Jorge Ortiz	Goa	Match 77	(India) Asish Rai	Hyderabad	Match 115 (F)	(India) Bipin Singh	Mumbai City
Match 39	(Germany) Matti Steinmann	East Bengal		Source:				

== Season awards ==
Award	Winner	Club
Hero of the League	(Fiji) Roy Krishna	ATK Mohun Bagan
Golden Boot	(Spain) Igor Angulo	Goa
Golden Glove	(India) Arindam Bhattacharya	ATK Mohun Bagan
Winning Pass of the League	(Spain) Alberto Noguera	Goa
Emerging Player of the League	(India) Lalengmawia	NorthEast United

Team of the Season
Goalkeeper	(India) Amrinder Singh (Mumbai City)			
Defence	(India) Akash Mishra (Hyderabad)	(Spain) Ivan Garrido (Goa)	(Senegal) Mourtada Fall (Mumbai City)	(India) Seriton Fernandes (Goa)
Midfield	(Spain) Edu Bedia (Goa)		(South Africa) Cole Alexander (Odisha)	(Argentina) Facundo Pereyra (Kerala Blasters)
Attack	(Spain) Jorge Ortiz (Goa)		(India) Manvir Singh (ATK Mohun Bagan)	(Fiji) Roy Krishna (ATK Mohun Bagan)

== See also ==
- 2020−21 I-League
- 2020–21 in Indian football
