= Sergio Lobera =

Spanish football manager (born 1977)

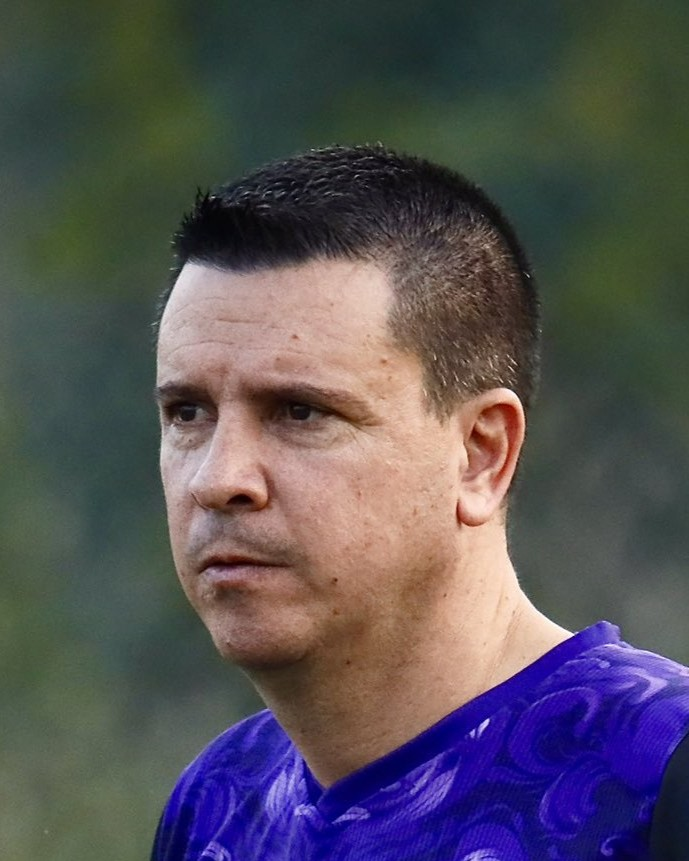
- Lobera with Odisha in 2024

Personal information
- Full name: Sergio Lobera Rodríguez
- Date of birth: 16 January 1977 (age 49)
- Place of birth: Zaragoza, Spain

Team information
- Current team: AD Ceuta FC (manager)

Managerial career
- Years: Team
- 1997–2006: Barcelona (youth)
- 2006–2007: Barcelona C
- 2008–2009: Terrassa
- 2010–2011: San Roque
- 2011–2012: AD Ceuta
- 2012: Barcelona (assistant)
- 2012–2014: Las Palmas
- 2014–2017: Moghreb Tétouan
- 2017–2020: Goa
- 2020–2021: Mumbai City
- 2022–2023: Sichuan Jiuniu
- 2023–2025: Odisha
- 2025–2026: Mohun Bagan
- 2026–: AD Ceuta FC

Sergio Lobera Rodríguez (born 16 January 1977) is a Spanish professional football manager, currently in charge of Segunda División AD Ceuta FC.

== Career ==
Lobera was born in Zaragoza, Aragon. After impressing with Dosa Salesians and UFB Jàbac Terrassa he signed with FC Barcelona in 1997, going through its youth system and being the manager of the C team in 2006–07, in the Tercera División. He was appointed sporting director at Terrassa FC in June 2007, also being their coach for the last seven games of the season.

In May 2010, Lobera was appointed CD San Roque de Lepe manager, agreeing to a three-year deal. The following campaign, he was in charge of AD Ceuta also in the Segunda División B.

On 11 May 2012, Lobera was named FC Barcelona's assistant manager behind Tito Vilanova. However, roughly a month later, he signed as head coach of Segunda División side UD Las Palmas.

Lobera finished his first season in charge of a professional club in sixth position, being defeated in the play-offs by eventually promoted UD Almería. He renewed with the Canarians on 18 June 2013, but was relieved of his duties on 26 May of the following year.

On 24 December 2014, Lobera was appointed at Botola's Moghreb Tétouan until the end of the season. On 6 June 2017 he moved countries again, joining FC Goa from the Indian Super League on a two-year contract.

On 17 November 2018, Lobera renewed his link at the Fatorda Stadium until 2020. Five months later, he led his team to the conquest of the Indian Super Cup. On 31 January 2020, however, he was dismissed despite being top of the table after several run-ins with the board of directors.

Lobera continued in the Indian top flight in March 2020, signing with Mumbai City FC. He was officially presented on 12 October, being crowned champion in his debut campaign.

On 19 January 2022, Lobera was appointed at China League One club Sichuan Jiuniu FC. Unsuccessful in securing promotion to the Super League, he left at the end of a single season and a seventh-place finish.

On 17 May 2023, Lobera became the head coach of Odisha FC on a two-year deal in his return to India. He left by mutual agreement in November 2025, being announced at Mohun Bagan Super Giant shortly after.

Lobera's contract expired in June 2026. He went back to Spain on 8 November, joining second-tier AD Ceuta FC.

== Managerial statistics ==
As of match played 9 May 2026

Managerial record by team and tenure
Team	Nat.	From	To	Record								Ref
Team	Nat.	From	To	G	W	D	L	GF	GA	GD	Win %	Ref
Barcelona C	(Spain)	1 July 2006	30 May 2007	38	10	15	13	45	52	−7	26.32	
Terrassa	(Spain)	31 March 2008	26 May 2009	47	15	10	22	53	73	−20	31.91	
San Roque	(Spain)	20 May 2010	16 May 2011	40	18	10	12	44	38	+6	45.00	
AD Ceuta	(Spain)	18 May 2011	13 May 2012	43	14	11	18	54	60	−6	32.56	
Las Palmas	(Spain)	17 June 2012	26 May 2014	94	40	25	29	126	112	+14	42.55	
Moghreb Tétouan	(Morocco)	24 December 2014	31 May 2017	93	35	22	36	105	119	−14	37.63	
Goa	(India)	7 June 2017	1 February 2020	60	33	11	16	127	78	+49	55.00	
Mumbai City	(India)	12 October 2020	8 October 2021	23	13	6	4	39	21	+18	56.52	
Sichuan Jiuniu	(China)	19 January 2022	21 April 2023	36	19	3	14	46	36	+10	52.78	
Odisha	(India)	17 May 2023	26 November 2025	63	29	16	18	110	88	+22	46.03	
Mohun Bagan	(India)	26 November 2025	30 June 2026	13	7	5	1	23	9	+14	53.85	
AD Ceuta FC	(Spain)	8 November 2026	Present	0	0	0	0	0	0	+0	—	
Total				550	233	134	183	772	686	+86	42.36	—

== Honours ==
Goa

- Indian Super League Winners' Shield: 2019–20
- Super Cup: 2019

Mumbai City

- Indian Super League: 2020–21
- Indian Super League Winners' Shield: 2020–21

Odisha

- Super Cup runner-up: 2024

Individual

- FPAI Coach of the Year: 2020
