= 2021–22 Indian Super League =

8th season of the Indian Super League

Indian Super League
- League announcement poster
- Season: 2021–22
- Dates: 19 November 2021 – 20 March 2022
- Champions: Hyderabad; 1st ISL Cup title Indian title
- League Winners' Shield: Jamshedpur; 1st ISL Shield title
- AFC Champions League: Mumbai City
- AFC Cup: Odisha; Mohun Bagan
- Matches: 115
- Goals: 354 (3.08 per match)
- Top goalscorer: Bartholomew Ogbeche (18 goals)
- Best goalkeeper: Prabhsukhan Singh Gill (7 clean sheets)
- Biggest home win: Hyderabad 6–1 Odisha (28 December 2021)
- Biggest away win: NorthEast United 0–5 Hyderabad (31 January 2022); Chennaiyin 0–5 Goa (9 February 2022)
- Highest scoring: Odisha FC 6–4 East Bengal FC (30 November 2021)
- Longest winning run: 7 matches Jamshedpur
- Longest unbeaten run: 15 matches Mohun Bagan
- Longest winless run: 11 matches East Bengal FC
- Longest losing run: 3 matches Bengaluru; East Bengal FC; Goa; North East United; Chennaiyin

The 2021–22 Indian Super League season was the eighth season of the Indian Super League (ISL) since its formation in 2013 and the 26th season of the top division of Indian football league system. The season started on 19 November 2021 and concluded with the final on 20 March 2022. Except for the final, it was hosted behind closed doors across three venues in Goa due to the COVID-19 pandemic in India.

Jamshedpur won the League Winners' Shield and Hyderabad won the trophy having defeated Kerala Blasters in the final.

== Changes from last season ==
The All India Football Federation Executive Committee decided to implement the 3+1 rule in I-League and discussed implementing it in the Super League from the 2021–22 season. FSDL, agreeing to the suggestions made by AIFF Executive Committee have made significant changes in players registration and foreign players number in the squad enforceable from 2021 to 2022 Indian Super League season. The changes have been made keeping in mind the AFC Club competitions regulations which follow 3+1 foreign players rule and to give more chances to domestic players in the league. The changes made were:

- A club can now sign maximum of six and minimum of four foreigners including at least one player who hails from an AFC affiliated nation.
- Four foreigners can play on the field at any instant of a match.
- A decrease in foreign player numbers from 5 to 4 mandates the clubs to have a minimum of seven 7 Indian players on the field at any time.
- A club also has the option to sign a foreign marquee player within the League-approved classifications.
- Clubs to increase their development player signing from a minimum of 2 to 4 while continuing to have 2 of such development players be part of the match-day squad.
- A club can have a maximum squad strength of 35 players, with at least three registered goalkeepers. A club can also have an injury replacement for an Indian player (outside the max. 35 registered players).
- The squad salary cap remains at ₹16.5 crore (equivalent to ₹20 crore or US$2.1 million in 2026) for season 2021–22.

== Teams ==
Locations of the Indian Super League teams

=== Stadiums and locations ===
Locations of the stadiums in Goa

Club	State/Region	City	Host Venue	Capacity
Mohun Bagan Super Giant	West Bengal	Kolkata	Fatorda Stadium	19,000
Mumbai City	Maharashtra	Mumbai	Fatorda Stadium	19,000
NorthEast United	Assam	Guwahati	Fatorda Stadium	19,000
Bengaluru	Karnataka	Bengaluru	GMC Athletic Stadium	3,000
Goa	Goa	Margao	GMC Athletic Stadium	3,000
Hyderabad	Telangana	Hyderabad	GMC Athletic Stadium	3,000
Jamshedpur	Jharkhand	Jamshedpur	GMC Athletic Stadium	3,000
Chennaiyin	Tamil Nadu	Chennai	Tilak Maidan Stadium	5,000
East Bengal FC	West Bengal	Kolkata	Tilak Maidan Stadium	5,000
Kerala Blasters	Kerala	Kochi	Tilak Maidan Stadium	5,000
Odisha	Odisha	Bhubaneswar	Tilak Maidan Stadium	5,000

=== Personnel and sponsorship ===
Team	Head coach	Captain(s)	Kit Manufacturer	Main Sponsor
Mohun Bagan Super Giant	(Spain) Juan Ferrando	(Fiji) Roy Krishna; (India) Pritam Kotal; (India) Subashish Bose	Nivia	SBOTOP
Bengaluru	(Germany) Marco Pezzaiuoli	(India) Sunil Chhetri; (India) Gurpreet Singh Sandhu	Puma	JSW
Chennaiyin	(India) Syed Sabir Pasha (interim)	(India) Anirudh Thapa	Nivia	Apollo Tyres
East Bengal	(Spain) Mario Rivera		Reyaur	Shree Cement
Goa	(India) Derrick Pereira	(Spain) Edu Bedia; (Spain) Iván Gonzalez; (India) Brandon Fernandes; (India) Seriton Fernandes	Reyaur	1xNews
Hyderabad	(Spain) Manuel Roca	(Brazil) Joao Victor; (India) Laxmikant Kattimani; (Nigeria) Bartholomew Ogbeche	Hummel	DafaNews
Jamshedpur	(Scotland) Owen Coyle	(England) Peter Hartley	Nivia	Tata Steel
Kerala Blasters	(Serbia) Ivan Vukomanović	(Uruguay) Adrian Luna	SIX5SIX	BYJU'S
Mumbai City	(England) Des Buckingham	(Senegal) Mourtada Fall	Puma	Expo 2020
NorthEast United	(India) Khalid Jamil	(India) Subhasish Roy Chowdhury; (Spain) Hernan Santana	SIX5SIX	Amrit Cement
Odisha	(Spain) Kino García (interim)	(Spain) Hector Rodas; (Spain) Victor Mongil	Hummel	Odisha Tourism

=== Managerial changes ===
Team	Outgoing manager	Manner of departure	Date of vacancy	Position in table	Incoming manager	Date of appointment	Ref.
Bengaluru	(India) Naushad Moosa	End of interim period		Pre-season	(Germany) Marco Pezzaiuoli	12 February 2021	
Kerala Blasters	(India) Ishfaq Ahmed	End of interim period	26 February 2021	Pre-season	(Serbia) Ivan Vukomanović	17 June 2021	
Chennaiyin	(Hungary) Csaba László	End of contract	10 April 2021	Pre-season	(Montenegro) Božidar Bandović	10 July 2021	
Odisha	(India) Steven Dias	End of interim period	27 February 2021	Pre-season	(Spain) Kiko Ramírez	20 July 2021	
East Bengal	(England) Robbie Fowler	Mutual Consent	8 September 2021	Pre-season	(Spain) Manolo Díaz	8 September 2021	
Mumbai City	(Spain) Sergio Lobera	End of contract	8 October 2021	Pre-season	(England) Des Buckingham	8 October 2021	
Mohun Bagan Super Giant	(Spain) Antonio Lopez Habas	Resigned	17 December 2021	6th	(Spain) Juan Ferrando	20 December 2021	
Goa	(Spain) Juan Ferrando	Resigned	20 December 2021	8th	(India) Derrick Pereira	21 December 2021	
East Bengal	(Spain) Manolo Díaz	Resigned	28 December 2021	11th	(Spain) Mario Rivera	1 January 2022	
Odisha	(Spain) Kiko Ramírez	Sacked	14 January 2022	9th	(Spain) Kino García	14 January 2022	
Chennaiyin	(Montenegro) Božidar Bandović	Sacked	11 February 2022	8th	(India) Syed Sabir Pasha	11 February 2022	

== Foreign players ==
Bold letters suggest the player was signed in the winter transfer window

Club	Player 1	Player 2	Player 3	Player 4	Player 5	AFC Player	Former Player(s)
Mohun Bagan Super Giant	(Fiji) Roy Krishna	(Finland) Joni Kauko	(France) Hugo Boumous	(Republic of Ireland) Carl McHugh	(Spain) Tiri	(Australia) David Williams	
Bengaluru	(Brazil) Alan Costa	(Brazil) Bruno Ramires	(Brazil) Cleiton Silva	(Cameroon) Yaya Banana	(Republic of the Congo) Prince Ibara	(Iran) Iman Basafa	(Gabon) Musavu-King
Chennaiyin	(Hungary) Vladimir Koman	(Lithuania) Nerijus Valskis	(Poland) Ariel Borysiuk	(Poland) Łukasz Gikiewicz	(Serbia) Slavko Damjanović	(Kyrgyzstan) Mirlan Murzaev	(Brazil) Rafael Crivellaro
East Bengal	(Brazil) Marcelo Ribeiro	(Croatia) Antonio Perošević	(Croatia) Franjo Prce	(Netherlands) Darren Sidoel	(Spain) Fran Sota	(Nepal) Ananta Tamang	(Nigeria) Daniel Chima (Slovenia) Amir Dervišević (Australia) Tomislav Mrcela
Goa	(Spain) Airam Cabrera	(Spain) Alberto Noguera	(Spain) Edu Bedia	(Spain) Iván González	(Spain) Jorge Ortiz	(Australia) Dylan Fox	
Hyderabad	(Brazil) João Victor	(Mauritania) Khassa Camara	(Nigeria) Bartholomew Ogbeche	(Spain) Javier Siverio	(Spain) Juanan	(Australia) Joel Chianese	(Spain) Edu García
Jamshedpur	(Brazil) Alex Lima	(Brazil) Eli Sabiá	(England) Peter Hartley	(Nigeria) Daniel Chima	(Scotland) Greg Stewart	(Australia) Jordan Murray	(Lithuania) Nerijus Valskis
Kerala Blasters	(Argentina) Jorge Pereyra Díaz	(Bosnia and Herzegovina) Enes Sipović	(Croatia) Marko Lešković	(Spain) Álvaro Vázquez	(Uruguay) Adrián Luna	(Bhutan) Chencho Gyeltshen	
Mumbai City	(Brazil) Cássio Gabriel	(Brazil) Diego Mauricio	(Morocco) Ahmed Jahouh	(Senegal) Mourtada Fall	(Spain) Igor Angulo	(Australia) Bradden Inman	(Brazil) Ygor Catatau
NorthEast United	(Austria) Marco Sahanek	(Brazil) Marcelinho	(France) Zakaria Diallo	(Jamaica) Deshorn Brown	(Spain) Hernán Santana	(Australia) Patrick Flottmann	(Uruguay) Federico Gallego (Martinique) Mathias Coureur (Mauritania) Khassa Camara
Odisha	(Brazil) Jonathas de Jesus	(Spain) Aridai Cabrera	(Spain) Héctor Rodas	(Spain) Javi Hernández	(Spain) Víctor Mongil	(Malaysia) Liridon Krasniqi	

== Regular season ==
=== League table ===
Pos	Team	Pld	W	D	L	GF	GA	GD	Pts	Qualification
1	Jamshedpur (L)	20	13	4	3	42	21	+21	43	Qualification to ISL playoffs and Playoffs for 2023–24 AFC Champions League group stage
2	Hyderabad (Note: Hyderabad qualified for Playoffs for 2023–24 AFC Cup qualifying playoffs by winning the ISL playoffs) (C)	20	11	5	4	43	23	+20	38	Qualification to ISL playoffs and Playoffs for 2023–24 AFC Cup qualifying playoffs
3	ATK Mohun Bagan	20	10	7	3	37	26	+11	37	Qualification to ISL playoffs
4	Kerala Blasters	20	9	7	4	34	24	+10	34	Qualification to ISL playoffs
5	Mumbai City	20	9	4	7	36	31	+5	31	
6	Bengaluru	20	8	5	7	32	27	+5	29	
7	Odisha	20	6	5	9	31	43	−12	23	
8	Chennaiyin	20	5	5	10	17	35	−18	20	
9	Goa	20	4	7	9	29	35	−6	19	
10	NorthEast United	20	3	5	12	25	43	−18	14	
11	East Bengal	20	1	8	11	18	36	−18	11	

Source: Indian Super League
Rules for classification: 1) points; 2) head-to-head points; 3) head-to-head goal difference; 4) head-to-head goals scored; 5) goal difference; 6) number of goals scored; 7) fair play ranking; 8) drawing of lots
(C) Champions; (L) League Winners' Shield Winners

=== Results ===
Home \ Away	MSG	BEN	CHE	EAB	GOA	HYD	JAM	KER	MCI	NEU	OFC
Mohun Bagan Super Giant	—	2–0	1–1	3–1	2–1	2–2	0–1	4–2	1–5	3–1	0–0
Bengaluru	3–3	—	3–0	1–1	1–1	1–2	3–1	1–1	1–3	4–2	2–1
Chennaiyin	0–1	2–4	—	0–0	0–5	1–1	1–4	0–3	0–1	2–1	2–1
East Bengal FC	0–3	0–1	2–2	—	3–4	0–4	1–1	1–1	0–0	1–1	1–2
Goa	0–2	2–1	1–0	1–2	—	1–1	1–3	4–4	0–2	1–1	1–1
Hyderabad	1–2	1–0	0–1	1–1	3–2	—	0–3	2–1	2–1	5–1	6–1
Jamshedpur	2–1	0–0	0–1	1–0	1–0	1–1	—	3–0	3–2	3–2	5–1
Kerala Blasters	2–2	0–1	3–0	1–0	2–2	1–0	1–1	—	3–1	2–1	2–1
Mumbai City	1–1	0–3	1–0	1–0	3–0	1–3	4–2	0–3	—	1–1	4–1
NorthEast United	2–3	2–1	1–2	2–0	2–1	0–5	2–3	0–0	3–3	—	0–2
Odisha	1–1	3–1	2–2	6–4	1–1	2–3	0–4	0–2	4–2	1–0	—

Updated to match(es) played on 6 March 2022. Source: Indian Super League
Legend: Blue = home team win; Yellow = draw; Red = away team win.

=== Results by match ===
The table lists the results of the teams after each match.

Team ╲ Round	1	2	3	4	5	6	7	8	9	10	11	12	13	14	15	16	17	18	19	20
Mohun Bagan Super Giant	W	W	L	L	D	D	W	W	D	D	W	D	W	D	W	W	W	D	W	L
Bengaluru	W	L	D	L	L	L	D	D	W	D	W	L	D	W	W	W	L	L	W	W
Chennaiyin	W	W	D	D	L	W	L	L	W	L	D	W	L	D	L	L	D	L	L	L
East Bengal	D	L	L	D	L	D	L	D	D	D	L	W	L	L	D	L	L	L	D	L
Goa	L	L	L	W	W	D	D	L	D	W	D	L	D	L	D	W	L	L	L	D
Hyderabad	L	W	D	W	W	D	D	W	D	L	D	L	W	W	W	L	W	W	W	W
Jamshedpur	D	W	D	W	L	W	D	D	L	W	W	W	W	W	L	W	W	W	W	W
Kerala Blasters	L	D	D	W	D	W	W	D	D	W	W	W	D	L	W	L	W	L	W	D
Mumbai City	W	L	W	W	W	W	L	D	L	D	L	L	L	D	D	W	W	W	W	L
Northeast United	L	D	L	W	L	L	W	L	D	L	D	L	L	D	L	L	L	W	L	D
Odisha	W	W	L	W	L	L	D	L	W	L	W	D	L	D	W	L	D	L	D	L

Updated to match(es) played on 7 March 2022. Source: Indian Super League
W = Win; D = Draw; L = Lose

== Playoffs ==
=== Bracket ===
Semi-finals
1	Jamshedpur	0	1	1
4	Kerala Blasters	1	1	2
2	Hyderabad	3	0	3
3	ATK Mohun Bagan	1	1	2

Final
4	Kerala Blasters	1 (1)
2	Hyderabad (p)	1 (3)

=== Semi-finals ===
Team 1	Agg.	Team 2	1st leg	2nd leg
Jamshedpur	1–2	Kerala Blasters	0–1	1–1
Hyderabad	3–2	ATK Mohun Bagan	3–1	0–1

=== Final ===
20 March 2022
14:00 GMT/19:30IST

Hyderabad	1–1 (a.e.t.)	Kerala Blasters
Tavora 88'	Report	Rahul KP 68'
Penalties
João MJT (penalty scored); Siverio (penalty missed); K. Camara (penalty scored); Hali (penalty scored)	3–1	Lešković (penalty missed); Nishu (penalty missed); Ayush (penalty scored); Jeakson (penalty missed)

Fatorda Stadium, Margao, Goa
Attendance: 11,500
Referee: Crystal John

== Season statistics ==
=== Scoring ===
==== Top scorers ====
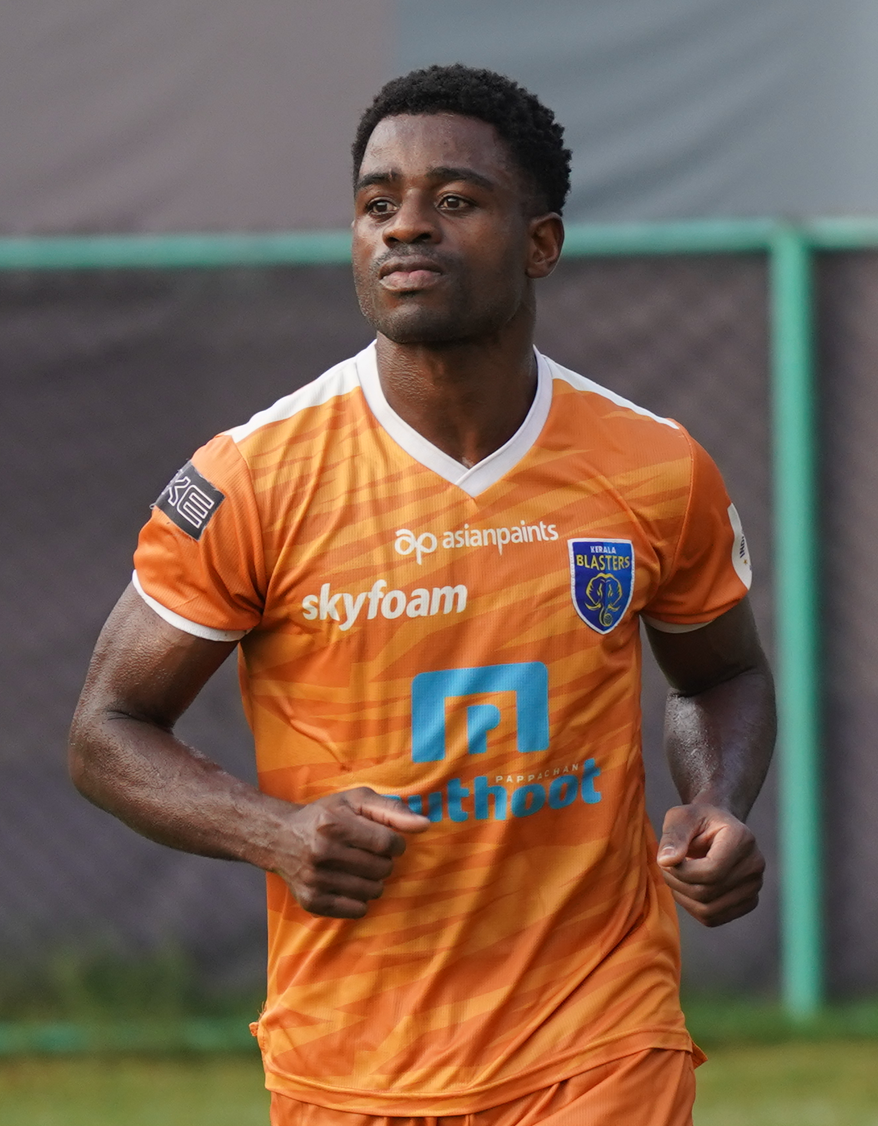
Bartholomew Ogbeche won his first Indian Super League Golden Boot after scoring 18 goals, a joint-record for an ISL season.

Rank	Player	Club	Goals
1	(Nigeria) Bartholomew Ogbeche	Hyderabad	18
2	(Spain) Igor Angulo	Mumbai City	10
2	(Scotland) Greg Stewart	Jamshedpur	10
4	(Brazil) Cleiton Silva	Bengaluru	9
4	(Nigeria) Daniel Chima Chukwu	Jamshedpur	9
6	(Spain) Jorge Ortiz	Goa	8
6	(Brazil) Jonathas de Jesus	Odisha	8
6	(Argentina) Jorge Pereyra Díaz	Kerala Blasters	8
6	(India) Liston Colaco	Mohun Bagan Super Giant	8
6	(Spain) Álvaro Vázquez	Kerala Blasters	8

==== Top Indian scorers ====
Rank	Player	Club	Goals
1	Liston Colaco	Mohun Bagan Super Giant	8
2	Bipin Singh	Mumbai City	6
2	Sahal Abdul Samad	Kerala Blasters	6
2	Manvir Singh	Mohun Bagan Super Giant	6
5	Laldanmawia Ralte	NorthEast United	4
5	Ritwik Das	Jamshedpur	4
5	V. P. Suhair	NorthEast United	4
5	Sunil Chhetri	Bengaluru	4
9	Kiyan Nassiri	Mohun Bagan Super Giant	3
9	Vikram Pratap Singh	Mumbai City	3
9	Ishan Pandita	Jamshedpur	3
9	Danish Farooq Bhat	Bengaluru	3
9	Udanta Singh	Bengaluru	3
9	Jerry Mawihmingthanga	Odisha	3

==== Hat-tricks ====
Player	For	Against	Result	Date	Ref
(Scotland) Greg Stewart	Jamshedpur	Odisha	4–0 (A)	14 December 2021	
(Jamaica) Deshorn Brown	NorthEast United	Mumbai City	3–3 (H)	27 December 2021	
(Nigeria) Bartholomew Ogbeche	Hyderabad	East Bengal	4–0 (A)	24 January 2022	
(India) Kiyan Nassiri	ATK Mohun Bagan	East Bengal	3–1 (H)	29 January 2022	
(Spain) Jorge Ortiz	Goa	Chennaiyin	5–0 (A)	9 February 2022	
(Spain) Airam Cabrera	Goa	Kerala Blasters	4–4 (H)	6 March 2022	

=== Clean Sheets ===
Rank	Player	Club	Clean sheets
1	(India) Prabhsukhan Singh Gill	Kerala Blasters	7
2	(India) Rehenesh TP	Jamshedpur	6
2	(India) Amrinder Singh	ATK Mohun Bagan	6
4	(India) Mohammad Nawaz	Mumbai City	5
5	(India) Gurpreet Singh Sandhu	Bengaluru	3
5	(India) Laxmikant Kattimani	Hyderabad	3

=== Discipline ===
==== Player ====
- Most yellow cards: 7
  - 6 players
- Most red cards: 1
  - 12 players

==== Club ====
- Most yellow cards: 50
  - Kerala Blasters
- Most red cards: 3
  - ATK Mohun Bagan

== Awards ==
=== Hero of the Match ===
Match	Hero of the Match		Match	Hero of the Match		Match	Hero of the Match	
Match	Player	Club	Match	Player	Club	Match	Player	Club
Match 1	(France) Hugo Boumous	ATK Mohun Bagan	Match 40	(Spain) Iván González	Goa	Match 78	(Spain) Víctor Mongil	Odisha
Match 2	(India) Udanta Singh	Bengaluru	Match 41	(Scotland) Greg Stewart	Jamshedpur	Match 79	(Netherlands) Darren Sidoel	East Bengal
Match 3	(Croatia) Antonio Perošević	East Bengal	Match 42	(Jamaica) Deshorn Brown	NorthEast United	Match 80	(Spain) Tiri	ATK Mohun Bagan
Match 4	(Spain) Igor Angulo	Mumbai City	Match 43	(Nigeria) Bartholomew Ogbeche	Hyderabad	Match 81	(Spain) Álvaro Vázquez	Kerala Blasters
Match 5	(Hungary) Vladimir Koman	Chennaiyin	Match 44	(India) Liston Colaco	ATK Mohun Bagan	Match 82	(Brazil) Bruno Ramires	Bengaluru
Match 6	(Spain) Javi Hernández	Odisha	Match 45	(India) Naorem Roshan Singh	Bengaluru	Match 83	(India) Lallianzuala Chhangte	Mumbai City
Match 7	(Spain) Hernan Santana	NorthEast United	Match 46	(Spain) Jorge Ortiz	Goa	Match 84	(Spain) Javi Hernández	Odisha
Match 8	(Lithuania) Nerijus Valskis	Jamshedpur	Match 47	(India) Mohammad Sajid Dhot	Chennaiyin	Match 85	(India) Liston Colaco	ATK Mohun Bagan
Match 9	(Finland) Joni Kauko	ATK Mohun Bagan	Match 48	(India) Jerry Mawihmingthanga	Odisha	Match 86	(Spain) Jorge Ortiz	Goa
Match 10	(Brazil) João Victor	Hyderabad	Match 49	(India) Adil Khan	East Bengal	Match 87	(Scotland) Greg Stewart	Jamshedpur
Match 11	(India) Harmanjot Khabra	Kerala Blasters	Match 50	(India) Asish Rai	Hyderabad	Match 88	(Brazil) João Victor	Hyderabad
Match 12	(India) Lallianzuala Chhangte	Chennaiyin	Match 51	(India) Ishan Pandita	Jamshedpur	Match 89	(Finland) Joni Kauko	ATK Mohun Bagan
Match 13	(Spain) Héctor Rodas	Odisha	Match 52	(India) Sourav Das	East Bengal	Match 90	(India) Bipin Singh	Mumbai City
Match 14	(India) Vikram Pratap Singh	Mumbai City	Match 53	(India) Thoiba Singh Moirangthem	Odisha	Match 91	(India) Lalthathanga Khawlhring	Kerala Blasters
Match 15	(Scotland) Greg Stewart	Jamshedpur	Match 54	(India) Anwar Ali	Goa	Match 92	(India) Manvir Singh	ATK Mohun Bagan
Match 16	(India) Hira Mondal	East Bengal	Match 55	(Spain) Álvaro Vázquez	Kerala Blasters	Match 93	(India) Rahim Ali	Chennaiyin
Match 17	(Spain) Hernan Santana	NorthEast United	Match 56	(India) Naorem Roshan Singh	Bengaluru	Match 94	(India) Joe Zoherliana	NorthEast United
Match 18	(India) Lalengmawia Ralte	Mumbai City	Match 57	(Scotland) Greg Stewart	Jamshedpur	Match 95	(Nigeria) Bartholomew Ogbeche	Hyderabad
Match 19	(Uruguay) Adrián Luna	Kerala Blasters	Match 58	(India) Harmanjot Khabra	Kerala Blasters	Match 96	(India) Mobashir Rahman	Jamshedpur
Match 20	(India) Jitendra Singh	Jamshedpur	Match 59	(India) Debjit Majumder	Chennaiyin	Match 97	(India) Danish Farooq Bhat	Bengaluru
Match 21	(Spain) Alberto Noguera	Goa	Match 60	(Spain) Jorge Ortiz	Goa	Match 98	(India) Bipin Singh	Mumbai City
Match 22	(India) Souvik Chakrabarti	Hyderabad	Match 61	(India) Sandesh Jhingan	ATK Mohun Bagan	Match 99	(Spain) Juanan	Hyderabad
Match 23	(Brazil) Cássio Gabriel	Mumbai City	Match 62	(India) Lalthathanga Khawlhring	Kerala Blasters	Match 100	(India) Sebastian Thangmuansang	Odisha
Match 24	(Brazil) Jonathas de Jesus	Odisha	Match 63	(Brazil) Alex	Jamshedpur	Match 101	(India) Ricky Lallawmawma	Jamshedpur
Match 25	(India) Anirudh Thapa	Chennaiyin	Match 64	(Spain) Aridai Cabrera	Odisha	Match 102	(India) Sanjeev Stalin	Kerala Blasters
Match 26	(India) Devendra Murgaonkar	Goa	Match 65	(India) Naorem Mahesh Singh	East Bengal	Match 103	(India) Mehtab Singh	Mumbai City
Match 27	(Uruguay) Adrián Luna	Kerala Blasters	Match 66	(Uruguay) Adrián Luna	Kerala Blasters	Match 104	(India) Joe Zoherliana	NorthEast United
Match 28	(India) Asish Rai	Hyderabad	Match 67	(Scotland) Greg Stewart	Jamshedpur	Match 105	(Spain) Tiri	ATK Mohun Bagan
Match 29	(Scotland) Greg Stewart	Jamshedpur	Match 68	(Serbia) Slavko Damjanović	Chennaiyin	Match 106	(Nigeria) Daniel Chima Chukwu	Jamshedpur
Match 30	(India) Rahul Bheke	Mumbai City	Match 69	(Australia) Dylan Fox	Goa	Match 107	(India) Lara Sharma	Bengaluru
Match 31	(India) Subhasish Bose	ATK Mohun Bagan	Match 70	(Nigeria) Bartholomew Ogbeche	Hyderabad	Match 108	(India) Souvik Chakrabarti	Hyderabad
Match 32	(Mauritania) Khassa Camara	NorthEast United	Match 71	(Brazil) Cássio Gabriel	Mumbai City	Match 109	(Spain) Airam Cabrera	Goa
Match 33	(Serbia) Slavko Damjanović	Chennaiyin	Match 72	(India) Udanta Singh	Bengaluru	Match 110	(England) Peter Hartley	Jamshedpur
Match 34	(Spain) Airam Cabrera	Goa	Match 73	(India) Akash Mishra	Hyderabad	Match 111 (SF)	(India) Ruivah Hormipam	Kerala Blasters
Match 35	(Spain) Álvaro Vázquez	Kerala Blasters	Match 74	(India) Rehenesh TP	Jamshedpur	Match 112 (SF)	(Nigeria) Bartholomew Ogbeche	Hyderabad
Match 36	(Scotland) Greg Stewart	Jamshedpur	Match 75	(India) Kiyan Nassiri	ATK Mohun Bagan	Match 113 (SF)	(Uruguay) Adrián Luna	Kerala Blasters
Match 37	(India) Liston Colaco	ATK Mohun Bagan	Match 76	(India) Naorem Roshan Singh	Bengaluru FC	Match 114 (SF)	(India) Laxmikant Kattimani	Hyderabad
Match 38	(Uruguay) Adrián Luna	Kerala Blasters	Match 77	(Nigeria) Bartholomew Ogbeche	Hyderabad	Match 115 (F)	(India) Laxmikant Kattimani	Hyderabad
Match 39	(India) Lalrinliana Hnamte	East Bengal						

=== Season awards ===
Award	Winner	Club
Hero of the League	(Scotland) Greg Stewart	Jamshedpur
Golden Boot	(Nigeria) Bartholomew Ogbeche	Hyderabad
Golden Glove	(India) Prabhsukhan Singh Gill	Kerala Blasters
Emerging Player of the League	(India) Naorem Roshan Singh	Bengaluru

Team of the Season
Goalkeeper	(India) Hrithik Tiwari (FC Goa)			
Defence	(India) Akash Mishra (Mumbai City)	(Spain) Pol Moreno (FC Goa)	(India) Anwar Ali (East Bengal)	(India) Abhi Meitei (Mohammedan)
Midfield	(Spain) Sergio Llamas (Mohammedan)		(India) Anirudh Thapa (Mohun Bagan)	
Attack	(India) Noufal PN (Mumbai City)		(Serbia) Dejan Drazic (FC Goa)	(India) Edmund Lalrindika (East Bengal)
Forward	(Morocco) Youssef Ezzejjari (East Bengal)			

== See also ==
- 2021–22 I-League
- 2021–22 in Indian football
- 2022 AFC Champions League
- 2022 AFC Cup
- 2021 Durand Cup
