= Anselmo Eyegue =

Equatoguinean footballer (born 1990)

Personal information
- Full name: Anselmo Eyegue Nfono
- Date of birth: 5 September 1990 (age 36)
- Place of birth: Malabo, Equatorial Guinea
- Height: 1.74 m (5 ft 9 in)
- Positions: Forward; attacking midfielder

Team information
- Current team: Pas de la Casa

Youth career
- Briquets Deportivo
- Guineueta
- 2003–2008: Damm
- 2008–2009: Barcelona

Senior career*
Years	Team	Apps	(Gls)
2009	Alcoyano	3	(0)
2009–2010	Alcoyano B		
2010	Getafe B	11	(5)
2010	Pulpileño	10	(1)
2011–2012	Bowsher		
2012–2013	Gramenet	25	(2)
2013–2014	La Jonquera	21	(8)
2014	Montañesa		
2014–2015	Vilassar de Mar	14	(0)
2015–2016	CF Lloreda		
2017–2018	Atlético Piferrar		
2018–2020	Navata CF	20	(15)
2022	CD Arrabal-Calaf	6	(4)
2023	CE Alt Empordà		
2023–	Pas de la Casa	0	(0)

International career^{‡}
2008–2010	Equatorial Guinea	4	(1)
- * Club domestic league appearances and goals as of 5 November 2022 ‡ National team caps and goals as of 9 December 2014

Anselmo Eyegue Nfono (born 5 September 1990) is an Equatoguinean professional footballer who plays as a forward for Andorran Primera Divisió club Pas de la Casa. He capped for the Equatorial Guinea national team.

== Club career ==
Anselmo played his first years for Briquets Deportivo, EE Guineueta and CF Damm. He signed for FC Barcelona Juvenil A, FC Barcelona's youth team aged 18 where he played 30 matches and scored 7 goals. He played for Spanish teams CD Alcoyano, Getafe FC and CA Pulpileño and then had an unsuccessful trial with Colombian team La Equidad, signing shortly after with Omani club Bowsher. In 2012, Anselmo returned to Spain, where signed for UDA Gramenet. Later he played for UE La Jonquera and CF Montañesa. He last played for Navata CF in the Catalonian third division.

== International career ==
Anselmo made his Equatorial Guinea national team debut on 15 June 2008 in a World Cup 2010 Qualifying match against Nigeria in Malabo. That day the Nzalang Nacional (the nickname of Equatorial Guinea national football team) lost by 1–0. Later, he played against South Africa on 11 October 2008, in Malabo and a friendly match against Cape Verde on 28 March 2009 in Espargos. He scored against Morocco on 11 August 2010.

== Career statistics ==
=== International ===
==== International appearances ====
Team	Year	Apps	Goals
Equatorial Guinea	2008	2	0
Equatorial Guinea	2009	1	0
Equatorial Guinea	2010	1	1
Total		4	1

==== International goals ====
International goals
No.	Date	Venue	Opponent	Score	Result	Competition
1	2010-08-11	Prince Moulay Abdellah Stadium, Rabat, Morocco	Morocco	0–1	2–1	Friendly match
