= Nerijus Valskis =

Lithuanian footballer

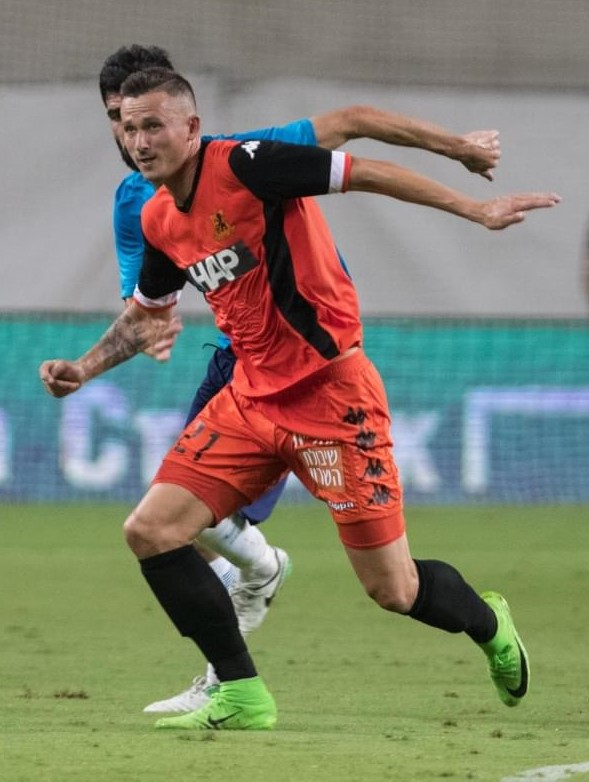
- Valskis with Bnei Yehuda in 2017

Personal information
- Full name: Nerijus Valskis
- Date of birth: 4 August 1987 (age 39)
- Place of birth: Klaipėda, Lithuanian SSR, Soviet Union
- Height: 1.85 m (6 ft 1 in)
- Position: Striker

Youth career
- 2004–2005: Polonia Vilnius

Senior career*
Years	Team	Apps	(Gls)
2005	Žalgiris Vilnius	10	(0)
2006	Kauno Jėgeriai		
2007–2008	Šilutė	37	(4)
2008	FBK Kaunas	10	(1)
2009	Smorgon	12	(0)
2010	FBK Kaunas	24	(16)
2011	Liepājas Metalurgs	27	(8)
2012	Minsk	10	(0)
2012–2013	Sūduva	38	(29)
2014	Universitatea Craiova	15	(2)
2015	Wigry Suwałki	5	(0)
2015–2016	Trakai	43	(24)
2017–2018	Bnei Yehuda	49	(11)
2018	Ratchaburi Mitr Phol	15	(9)
2019	Hapoel Tel Aviv	10	(1)
2019–2020	Chennaiyin	20	(15)
2020–2021	Jamshedpur	24	(10)
2022	Chennaiyin	11	(2)
2022–2024	Kauno Žalgiris	25	(8)

International career
2007–2008	Lithuania U21	6	(1)
2013–2024	Lithuania	25	(1)
- * Club domestic league appearances and goals

Nerijus Valskis (born 4 August 1987) is a Lithuanian former professional footballer who played as a forward.

== Club career ==
=== Earlier career ===
Valskis began his senior club career in 2005 at FK Žalgiris of Lithuanian A Lyga, where he made 11 appearances before moving to Kauno Jėgeriai. During 2007–2008 season, he appeared for FK Šilutė and scored 4 goals in 37 league matches. He later moved to another A Lyga outfit FBK Kaunas, where he scored 17 goals in two different seasons (2008 and 2010).

=== Belarus and Latvia ===
In 2009, he arrived in Belarus and signed with Belarusian Premier League side FC Smorgon. In 2011, he played for FC Smorgon in the Latvian Higher League where he scored 8 goals in 27 league matches. He then came back to Belarus with Minsk and he was in the 2011–12 Belarusian Cup Runners-up squad.

=== Lithuania ===
After several successful stints in foreign clubs, he returned to Lithuania and signed with giants FK Sūduva. During the 2013 A Lyga season, while playing for Sūduva, Valskis was awarded the Best Player and was also the league's leading scorer with 27 goals.

=== Poland ===
In 2014, Valskis signed for CS Universitatea Craiova of Romanian Liga I and appeared in 15 league games before moving to Polish club Wigry Suwałki.

=== Back to Lithuania ===
He returned to Lithuania with FK Riteriai during the 2015–2016 season. With the club, He scored 24 goals in 43 league matches. Valskis was in FK Riteriai's squad in that season, which finished runners-up in their domestic tournaments; A Lyga, Lithuanian Supercup and Lithuanian Football Cup.

=== More foreign stints ===
He went to Israel and played for Bnei Yehuda Tel Aviv in the 2017–2018 season. Valskis was part of Bnei Yehuda Tel Aviv squad which won the Israeli State Cup in 2017.

Valskis in 2018, moved to Thailand and appeared with Ratchaburi Mitr Phol in 15 Thai League 1 matches, scoring 9 goals.

=== Israel ===
After his previous appearances with Israeli side Bnei Yehuda, Valskis again came back to Israeli Premier League with Hapoel Tel Aviv in 2019. He signed for Hapoel Tel Aviv on a short-term contract until the end of the 2018–19 Israeli Premier League season. He scored only 1 goal in 10 league matches before moving to India.

=== India ===
Following his second stint in Israel, Valskis joined Indian Super League side Chennaiyin in July 2019. In his debut season in India, Valskis was the league's top goal scorer with 15 goals, winning the ISL golden boot. His goals helped to lead the club to the final of the Super League on 14 March 2020; he scored in the showpiece match but Chennaiyin lost 3–1 to ATK.

On 21 August 2020, after parting ways with Chennaiyin, Valskis signed a two-year contract with fellow Super League club Jamshedpur FC, reuniting with former boss Owen Coyle. He scored 8 goals for Jamshedpur in the 2020–21 Indian Super League season.

He returned to Chennaiyin on 1 January 2022 in the mid season of ISL 2021–22.

=== Retirement from professional football ===
On 26 February 2024, Valskis announced his retirement from professional football.

== International career ==
While playing for FK Sūduva, Valskis was called up in the national squad of Lithuania in 2013. He made his debut on 11 October, against Latvia in a 2014 FIFA World Cup qualification match.

He scored his only goal for his country against Estonia in the 2016 Baltic Cup. In that competition, Lithuania finished as the Runners-up.

From 2013, he has appeared in 24 international matches and represented Lithuania in competitions like Baltic Cup and UEFA Nations League alongside Euro Cup, 2014 FIFA World Cup and 2018 FIFA World Cup qualifiers.

== Career statistics ==
=== Club ===
Appearances and goals by club, season and competition
Club	Season	League			National Cup		League Cup		Other		Total	
Club	Season	Division	Apps	Goals	Apps	Goals	Apps	Goals	Apps	Goals	Apps	Goals
FK Žalgiris	2005	A Lyga	10	0	0	0	0	0	0	0	10	0
FK Šilutė	2007	A Lyga	22	0	0	0	0	0	0	0	22	0
FK Šilutė	2008	A Lyga	15	4	0	0	0	0	0	0	15	4
FK Šilutė	Total		48	4	0	0	0	0	0	0	48	4
FBK Kaunas	2008	A Lyga	10	1	1	0	4	2	4	0	19	3
FBK Kaunas	2009	A Lyga	0	0	1	0	0	0	0	0	1	0
FBK Kaunas	Total		10	1	2	0	4	2	4	0	20	3
Smorgon	2009	Belarusian Premier League	12	0	0	0	0	0	0	0	12	0
FBK Kaunas	2010	I Lyga	22	13	5	3	0	0	0	0	27	16
Liepājas Metalurgs	2011	Virslīga	27	8	3	1	0	0	4	0	34	9
Minsk	2012	Belarusian Premier League	10	0	2	0	0	0	0	0	12	0
FK Sūduva	2012	A Lyga	8	2	1	0	0	0	0	0	9	2
FK Sūduva	2013	A Lyga	30	27	1	1	0	0	2	2	33	30
FK Sūduva	Total		38	29	2	1	0	0	2	0	42	32
Universitatea Craiova	2013–14	Liga II	14	2	0	0	0	0	0	0	14	2
Universitatea Craiova	2014–15	Liga I	1	0	0	0	0	0	0	0	1	0
Universitatea Craiova	Total		15	2	0	0	0	0	0	0	15	2
Wigry Suwałki	2014–15	I liga	5	0	0	0	0	0	0	0	5	0
FK Trakai	2015	A Lyga	14	7	5	2	0	0	0	0	19	9
FK Trakai	2016	A Lyga	29	17	1	0	0	0	2	1	32	18
FK Trakai	Total		43	24	6	2	0	0	2	1	51	25
Bnei Yehuda Tel Aviv	2016–17	Israeli Premier League	14	4	5	2	0	0	0	0	19	6
Bnei Yehuda Tel Aviv	2017–18	Israeli Premier League	35	7	1	0	3	1	5	1	44	9
Bnei Yehuda Tel Aviv	Total		49	11	6	2	3	1	5	1	63	15
Ratchaburi Mitr Phol	2018	Thai League 1	15	9	0	0	0	0	0	0	15	9
Hapoel Tel Aviv	2018–19	Israeli Premier League	10	1	1	0	0	0	0	0	11	1
Chennaiyin	2019–20	Indian Super League	20	15	0	0	0	0	0	0	20	15
Jamshedpur	2020–21	Indian Super League	18	8	0	0	0	0	0	0	18	8
Jamshedpur	2021–22	Indian Super League	6	2	0	0	0	0	0	0	6	2
Jamshedpur	Total		24	10	0	0	0	0	0	0	24	10
Chennaiyin	2021–22	Indian Super League	11	2	0	0	0	0	0	0	11	2
FK Kauno Žalgiris	2022	A Lyga	13	4	2	0	0	0	0	0	15	4
FK Kauno Žalgiris	2023	A Lyga	12	4	2	0	0	0	2	0	16	4
FK Kauno Žalgiris	Total		25	8	4	0	0	0	2	0	31	8
Career total			383	137	31	9	7	3	17	4	438	153

=== International goals ===
As of match played 29 May 2016. Lithuania score listed first, score column indicates score after each Valskis goal.

International goals by date, venue, cap, opponent, score, result and competition
No.	Date	Venue	Cap	Opponent	Score	Result	Competition
1	29 May 2016	Klaipėdos M. Centrinis Stadionas, Klaipėda, Lithuania	6	Estonia	1–0	2–0	2016 Baltic Cup

== Honours ==
FBK Kaunas

- Latvian Football Cup: 2007–08
- Baltic League: 2008

Liepājas Metalurgs

- Latvian Football Cup runner-up: 2010–11

Minsk

- Belarusian Cup runner-up: 2011–12

Riteriai

- A Lyga runner-up: 2015, 2016
- Lithuanian Cup runner-up: 2016
- Lithuanian Supercup runner-up: 2016

Bnei Yehuda Tel Aviv

- Israel State Cup: 2016–17
- Israel Super Cup runner-up: 2017

Chennaiyin

- Indian Super League runner-up: 2019–20

Lithuania

- Baltic Cup runner-up: 2016

Individual

- A Lyga top scorer: 2013 (27 goals)
- A Lyga Best Player: 2013
- Indian Super League Golden Boot: 2019–20
