= Football Sports Development Limited =

Company operating the Indian Super League

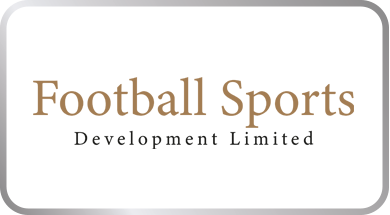
- Industry: Sports; Sports services
- Founded: 2 September 2013; 12 years ago
- Founder: Reliance Industries; IMG; Star Sports
- Headquarters: Mumbai
- Key people: Nita Ambani (Chairperson); Sanjog Gupta (Director); Martin Bain (CEO)
- Parent: Reliance Industries (65%); Star Sports (35%)

Football Sports Development Limited (FSDL) is an Indian company established to operate the Indian Super League, the top tier football league in India until 2025. The company is run as a subsidiary of Reliance. FSDL served as the commercial partners of All India Football Federation, until 8 December 2025 when the Master Rights Agreement (MRA) with AIFF to operate the Indian Super League expired.

== Indian Super League ==
On 9 December 2010, it was announced that the All India Football Federation had signed a 15-year, 700-crore deal with Reliance Industries and the International Management Group. in that deal they agreed to form a new professional league for the development of Indian football

The Indian Super League was founded in October 2013 by IMG–Reliance, along with All India Football Federation and STAR Sports. The goal of the league was to make football a top sport in India. The league was modelled along the lines of the popular Twenty20 cricket league, the Indian Premier League, and Major League Soccer of the United States. The league started in October 2014 with eight teams and ended in December 2014 with Atlético de Kolkata coming out as inaugural champions.

The league saw stars such as Roberto Carlos, Alessandro Nesta, Tim Cahill, Asamoah Gyan, Robert Pires, Dimitar Berbatov, Nicolas Anelka, Wes Brown, Carlos Marchena, David Trezeguet, Alessandro Del Piero, David James, Elano, Robbie Keane, Diego Forlán, Marco Materazzi, Freddie Ljungberg, Joan Capdevila, Aaron Hughes, Florent Malouda, Kostas Katsouranis, Luis García and Hélder Postiga come to India.

== Development League & Next Gen Cup ==
In June 2021 it was proposed by the organisers of ISL after a meeting with the CEOs of all the ISL clubs, that a new developmental league, called Reliance Foundation Development League, would be introduced in 2022. This new league would consist of the youth and reserve teams of all the ISL clubs, with aim to develop young players as there has been limited number of competitions and leagues outside the ISL since the pandemic. The teams would predominantly feature U-21 players with few overage players allowed as well. The inaugural season of the proposed two-month league was to be held in Goa inside a bio-secure bubble between January and March, following the same medical and safety procedures for 2021–22 ISL season, but got postponed to April 15. Out of all the ISL clubs, ATK Mohun Bagan, East Bengal, NorthEast United and Odisha didn't participate due to lack of youth teams, thus only seven clubs took part in the league along with Reliance Foundation Youth Champs football team. The league concluded on 12 May with Bengaluru topping the table and becoming the inaugural champions. Along with Bengaluru, Kerala Blasters qualified for Premier League's NextGen Cup 2022 in the UK as the top two teams in the league.

== See also ==
- International Management Group
- Reliance Industries
- Star Sports
