= Youssef Ezzejjari =

Spanish-born Singaporean footballer

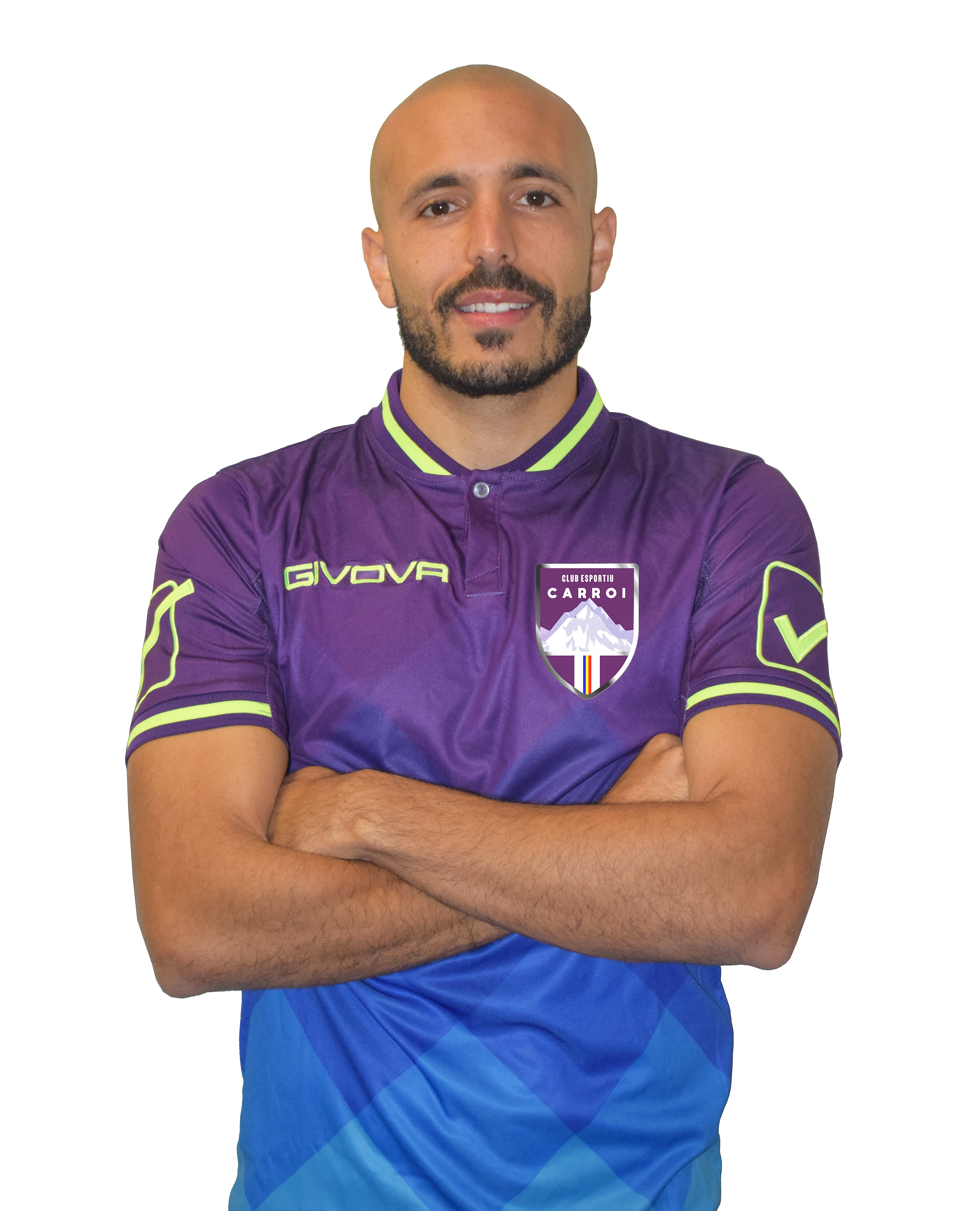
- Ezzejari in 2020 with Carroi

Personal information
- Full name: Youssef Ezzejjari Lhasnaoui
- Date of birth: 10 May 1993 (age 33)
- Place of birth: Santa Coloma de Gramenet, Spain
- Height: 1.85 m (6 ft 1 in)
- Position: Striker

Team information
- Current team: Al Hamriyah

Youth career
- 2011–2012: Manlleu
- 2013: Nike Academy

Senior career*
| Years | Team | Apps | (Gls) |
| 2012 | Granollers | 6 | (0) |
| 2013 | Vilassar de Mar | 14 | (0) |
| 2014 | Mollet | 10 | (3) |
| 2014–2015 | Gramenet | 31 | (5) |
| 2015–2016 | Avià | 15 | (2) |
| 2016 | Terrassa B | 24 | (5) |
| 2017 | Tona | 16 | (1) |
| 2017–2018 | Mataró | 33 | (14) |
| 2018–2019 | Guineueta | 26 | (9) |
| 2019–2020 | Oyonesa | 22 | (16) |
| 2020–2021 | Carroi | 22 | (18) |
| 2021–2022 | Persik Kediri | 32 | (18) |
| 2022–2023 | Bhayangkara | 12 | (4) |
| 2023 | Khon Kaen United | 6 | (1) |
| 2023 | Negeri Sembilan | 4 | (0) |
| 2023–2024 | Visakha | 11 | (10) |
| 2024–2025 | Barito Putera | 12 | (2) |
| 2025 | → Madura United (loan) | 17 | (4) |
| 2025–2026 | Tanjong Pagar United | 6 | (5) |
| 2026 | East Bengal | 13 | (11) |
| 2026– | Al Hamriyah | 7 | (4) |

International career
| 2009 | Morocco U17 | 5 | (0) |
- * Club domestic league appearances and goals as of 23:10, 21 May 2026 (UTC)

Youssef Ezzejjari Lhasnaoui (born 10 May 1993) is a professional footballer who plays as a striker for UAE Division One club Al Hamriyah. Born in Spain, he represented Morocco at youth level.

Ezzejjari has spend most of his career in Andorra, Indonesia, Thailand, Malaysia, Cambodia and Singapore.

== Club career ==
=== Youth ===
Trained in Catalonia grassroots football, Ezzejjari went through the quarries of clubs such as Badalona, Cornellà and ultimately Manlleu of the División de Honor Juvenil de Fútbol.

The following year in 2012, Ezzejjari signed for Granollers in the Third Division of Spain, and in January 2013 signed for Vilassar de Mar. In the summer of 2013, Ezzejjari travelled to England to be part of the combined Nike Academy, where he was later on probation to be part of Deportivo Alavés B of the Third Division of Spain, in addition to the Constància of Second Division B of Spain. Finally in March 2014 signed to Mollet UE.

The following seasons played in various regional teams; Gramenet, Avià, Terrassa B, Tona, Mataró and Guineueta.

In the 2019–2020 season, Ezzejjari signed with Oyonesa, where he also became the fifth scorer in group XVI with sixteen goals at the end of the campaign.

=== Carroi ===
In the summer of 2020, Ezzejjari signed for Andorran Primera Divisió club Carroi for the 2020–21 season. He made his debut on 30 November, as a starter in a 0–3 defeat to Penya d'Andorra. where he finished as the top scorer in Andorran football with 19 goals. and was also chosen as a forward reference in the first round of the championship. and included in the ideal team of the season in the elite category of Andorran football by the country's sports press. On 9 May 2021, he scored a hat-trick in a 3–2 win over Santa Coloma.

=== Persik Kediri ===
On 21 June 2021, Ezzejjari moved to Indonesia. He signed one-year contract with Indonesian Liga 1 club Persik Kediri. He made his debut on 27 August, as a starter in a 1–0 defeat to Bali United. On 17 September 2021, Ezzejjari scored his first and second goal for Persik in 2021–22 Liga 1, earning them a 2–2 draw over Persikabo 1973. Ezzejjari scored another brace for Persik Kediri in a 2–3 loss against PSM Makassar on 23 September 2021. And against Persipura Jayapura in a 4–2 win on 21 October 2021. Ezzejjari ended his first season at Persik Kediri with 32 appearances and 18 goals in 2021–22 Liga 1.

=== Bhayangkara ===
On 3 April 2022, Ezzejjari signed one-year contract with Indonesian Liga 1 club Bhayangkara. On 24 July 2022, he made his debut by starting in a 2–2 draw against Persib Bandung. And he also scored his first goal for the team, he scored in the 37th minute at the Wibawa Mukti Stadium.

=== Khon Kaen United ===
On 7 January 2023, Ezzejjari moved to Thai League 1 club Khon Kaen United. He scored a goal on his debut for the club in a 2–0 league win over Ratchaburi on 21 January.

=== Negeri Sembilan ===
In August 2023, Ezzejjari joined Malaysia Super League club Negeri Sembilan. He scored his first goal for the club in the second leg of the Round of 16 clash during the 2023 Malaysia Cup against Kelantan United in a 4–2 win.

=== Visakha ===
On 12 December 2023, Ezzejjari joined Cambodian Premier League club Visakha. He scored on his debut in a 3–1 lost to Phnom Penh Crown on 18 December. Ezzejjari scored a brace and recorded an assist in a 3–1 win over Prey Veng on 21 January. In the next match on 27 January, he scored a hat-trick as his team thrash Kirivong Sok Sen Chey 6–1.

=== Barito Putera ===
On 21 July 2024, Ezzejjari joined his third Indonesian club Barito Putera. On 14 September 2024, he scored a brace in a 2–2 draw against his former club Persik Kediri.

==== Madura United (loan) ====
On 7 January 2025, Ezzejjari was loan out to Madura United until the end of the 2024–25 season. He scored on his debut for the club scoring the only goal in the match against Malut United on 10 January. On 13 March, Ezzejjari scored in the AFC Challenge League quarter-final match against Taiwanese club Tainan City which he help his club to win 3–0 to advance to the semi-finals.

=== Tanjong Pagar United ===
On 25 July 2025, Ezzejjari signed with Singapore Premier League club Tanjong Pagar United. He then scored four goals in a 5–1 thrashing win over Young Lions on 25 September.

=== East Bengal ===
On 6 February 2026, Ezzejjari joined Indian Super League (ISL) club East Bengal. He made his debut against NorthEast United on 16 February in a 3–0 home win, scoring twice in the match. Again he scored a brace in the next match against SC Delhi in a brilliant 4–1 comeback. On 28 April, he scored a quick brace against Odisha FC after coming off the bench, thereby scoring 4 braces in 9 matches. Youssef Ezzejjari scored 11 goals in 13 matches in the ISL for East Bengal and won the Golden Boot for ISL 2025–26.

=== Al Hamriyah Club ===
On 12 July 2026, Ezzejjari signed for UAE Division One side Al Hamriyah.

== Career statistics ==
=== Club ===
As of 24 March 2026

| Club | Season | League | | | Cup | | Continental | | Total | |
| Club | Season | Division | Apps | Goals | Apps | Goals | Apps | Goals | Apps | Goals |
|---|---|---|---|---|---|---|---|---|---|---|
| CE Carroi | 2020–21 | Primera Divisió | 22 | 18 | 2 | 1 | 0 | 0 | 24 | 19 |
| CE Carroi | Total | | 22 | 18 | 2 | 1 | 0 | 0 | 24 | 19 |
| Persik Kediri | 2021–22 | Indonesian Liga 1 | 32 | 18 | 0 | 0 | 0 | 0 | 32 | 18 |
| Persik Kediri | Total | | 32 | 18 | 0 | 0 | 0 | 0 | 32 | 18 |
| Bhayangkara | 2022–23 | Indonesian Liga 1 | 12 | 4 | 4 | 1 | 0 | 0 | 16 | 5 |
| Bhayangkara | Total | | 12 | 4 | 4 | 1 | 0 | 0 | 16 | 5 |
| Khon Kaen United | 2022–23 | Thai League 1 | 6 | 0 | 1 | 0 | 0 | 0 | 7 | 0 |
| Khon Kaen United | Total | | 6 | 0 | 1 | 0 | 0 | 0 | 7 | 0 |
| Negeri Sembilan | 2023 | Malaysia Super League | 4 | 0 | 3 | 1 | 0 | 0 | 7 | 1 |
| Negeri Sembilan | Total | | 4 | 0 | 3 | 1 | 0 | 0 | 7 | 1 |
| Visakha | 2023–24 | Cambodian Premier League | 11 | 10 | 0 | 0 | 0 | 0 | 11 | 10 |
| Visakha | Total | | 11 | 10 | 0 | 0 | 0 | 0 | 11 | 10 |
| Barito Putera | 2024–25 | Indonesian Liga 1 | 12 | 2 | 0 | 0 | 0 | 0 | 12 | 2 |
| Barito Putera | Total | | 12 | 2 | 0 | 0 | 0 | 0 | 12 | 2 |
| Madura United (loan) | 2024–25 | Liga 1 (Indonesia) | 17 | 4 | 0 | 0 | 3 | 1 | 20 | 5 |
| Madura United (loan) | Total | | 17 | 4 | 0 | 0 | 3 | 1 | 20 | 5 |
| Tanjong Pagar United | 2025–26 | Singapore Premier League | 0 | 0 | 0 | 0 | 0 | 0 | 0 | 0 |
| Tanjong Pagar United | Total | | 0 | 0 | 0 | 0 | 0 | 0 | 0 | 0 |
| East Bengal FC | 2025–26 | Indian Super League | 6 | 7 | 0 | 0 | 0 | 0 | 6 | 7 |
| East Bengal FC | Total | | 6 | 7 | 0 | 0 | 0 | 0 | 6 | 7 |
| Career total | | | 122 | 63 | 10 | 3 | 3 | 1 | 135 | 67 |

== Honours ==
East Bengal

- Indian Super League: 2025–26

Individual

- Indian Super League Golden Boot: 2025–26
