= Indian Super League Golden Ball =

Annual award given to the best player in the Indian Super League

- Awarded for: Best player of a given Indian Super League season
- Country: India
- Presented by: Indian Super League
- First award: 2014
- Currently held by: Miguel Figueira

Highlights
- Most team wins: Goa; Mohun Bagan (2 each)
- Most consecutive team wins: Goa (2)

The Indian Super League Golden Ball is an annual association football award presented to the best player in the Indian Super League each season.

The Indian Super League was founded in 2013 and played its inaugural season in 2014. It became the joint top-tier of the Indian football league system by the 2017–18 season and has been the top-tier since the 2022–23 season. The first Golden Ball was awarded to Iain Hume in 2014. Sunil Chhetri is the first Indian player to have won the award in the 2017–18 season.

== Winners ==
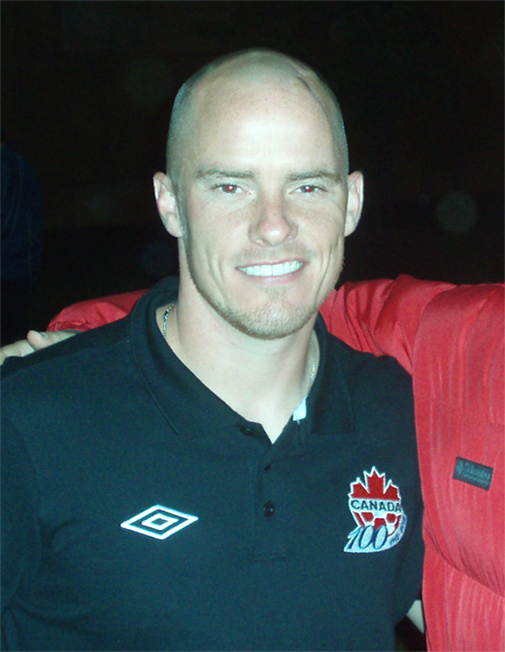
Iain Hume won the inaugural Indian Super League Golden Ball.

Key
Player (X)	Name of the player and number of times they had won the award at that point (if more than one)
†	Denotes the club were Indian Super League champions in the same season

Indian Super League Hero of the League Winners
Season	Player	Position	Nationality	Club	Ref(s)
2014	Iain Hume	Forward	Canada	Kerala Blasters	
2015	Stiven Mendoza	Forward	Colombia	Chennaiyin^{†}	
2016	Florent Malouda	Midfielder	France	Delhi Dynamos	
2017–18	Sunil Chhetri	Forward	India	Bengaluru	
2018–19	Coro	Forward	Spain	Goa	
2019–20	Hugo Boumous	Midfielder	France	Goa^{†}	
2020–21	Roy Krishna	Forward	Fiji	Mohun Bagan	
2021–22	Greg Stewart	Midfielder	Scotland	Jamshedpur^{†}	
2022–23	Lallianzuala Chhangte	Forward	India	Mumbai City^{†}	
2023–24	Dimitri Petratos	Forward	Australia	Mohun Bagan^{†}	
2024–25	Alaaeddine Ajaraie	Forward	Morocco	NorthEast United	
2025–26	Miguel Figueira	Midfielder	Brazil	East Bengal^{†}	

== Awards won by nationality ==
Country	Players	Total
France	2	2
India	2	2
Canada	1	1
Colombia	1	1
Fiji	1	1
Scotland	1	1
Spain	1	1
Australia	1	1
Morocco	1	1
Brazil	1	1

== Awards won by club ==
Club	Total
Goa	2
Mohun Bagan	2
Bengaluru	1
Chennaiyin	1
Jamshedpur	1
Kerala Blasters	1
Odisha	1
Mumbai City	1
NorthEast United	1
East Bengal	1

== See also ==
- Indian Super League
- Indian Super League Golden Boot
- Indian Super League Golden Glove
- Indian Super League Emerging Player of the League
- Indian Super League Winning Pass of the League
