= Indian Super League Winning Pass of the League =

Annual award given to the leading assist provider in the Indian Super League

- Awarded for: The leading assist provider in a given Indian Super League season
- Country: India
- Presented by: Indian Super League
- First award: 2016
- Final award: 2021
- Currently held by: Alberto Noguera

Highlights
- Most team wins: Goa (2)
- Most consecutive team wins: Goa (2)

The Indian Super League Winning Pass of the League was an annual association football award presented to the leading assist provider in the Indian Super League.

The Indian Super League was founded in 2013, eight teams competed in the 2014 inaugural season. It became the joint top-tier of Indian football league system by 2017–18 season and is the top-tier since 2022–23 season.

Indian Super League Winning Pass of the League was first awarded in 2016 and 2017–18 seasons for the best assist provided in the Indian Super League playoff finals. Since 2018–19 season, it has been awarded to the leading assist provider of a given Indian Super League season. Sameehg Doutie of ATK won the first award in 2016 and Arnold Issoko of Mumbai City won in 2018–19. The current holder is Alberto Noguera of Goa who won in 2020–21.

== Winners ==
Key
Player (X)	Name of the player and number of times they had won the award at that point (if more than one)
Games	The number of Indian Super League games played by the winner that season (Note: This does not necessarily match the total number of games in a season.)
Rate	The winner's assists-to-games ratio that season
†	Denotes the club were Indian Super League premiers or champions in the same season
#	Indian Super League record

Indian Super League Winning Pass of the League Winners
Season	Player	Position	Nationality	Club	Assists	Games	Rate	Ref(s)
2016	Sameehg Doutie	Midfielder	South Africa	ATK^{†}	4 (Note: One assist in the 2016 Indian Super League final)	14	0.29	
2017–18	Udanta Singh	Forward	India	Bengaluru	7 (Note: One assist in the 2018 Indian Super League final)	19	0.37	
2018–19	Arnold Issoko	Defender	Cape Verde	Mumbai City	8	18	0.44	
2019–20	Hugo Boumous	Midfielder	France	Goa^{†}	10^{#}	15	0.67	
2020–21	Alberto Noguera	Midfielder	Spain	Goa	8	20	0.4	

== Awards won by nationality ==
Country	Players	Total
Cape Verde	1	1
France	1	1
India	1	1
South Africa	1	1
Spain	1	1

== Awards won by club ==
Club	Total
Goa	2
ATK	1
Bengaluru	1
Mumbai City	1

== See also ==
- Indian Super League
- Indian Super League Golden Ball
- Indian Super League Golden Boot
- Indian Super League Golden Glove
- Indian Super League Emerging Player of the League
