= Indian Super League Emerging Player of the League =

Annual award given to the best young Indian player in the Indian Super League

- Awarded for: Best young player of a given Indian Super League season
- Country: India
- Presented by: Indian Super League
- First award: 2014
- Currently held by: Vikram Partap Singh

Highlights
- Most team wins: Kerala Blasters (3)
- Most consecutive team wins: Kerala Blasters; Chennaiyin; Bengaluru (2 each)

The Indian Super League Emerging Player of the League is an annual association football award presented to the best young player in the Indian Super League.

The Indian Super League was founded in 2013, eight teams competed in the 2014 inaugural season. It became the joint top-tier of Indian football league system by 2017–18 season and is the top-tier since 2022–23 season. The first Emerging Player of the League was awarded to Sandesh Jhingan of Kerala Blasters in 2014.

== Winners ==
Key
Player (X)	Name of the player
†	Denotes the club were Indian Super League champions in the same season

Indian Super League Emerging Player of the League Winners
Season	Player	Position	Club	Ref(s)
2014	Sandesh Jhingan	Defender	Kerala Blasters	
2015	Jeje Lalpekhlua	Forward	Chennaiyin^{†}	
2016	Jerry Lalrinzuala	Defender	Chennaiyin	
2017–18	Lalruatthara	Defender	Kerala Blasters	
2018–19	Sahal Abdul Samad	Midfielder	Kerala Blasters	
2019–20	Sumit Rathi	Defender	ATK^{†}	
2020–21	Lalengmawia Ralte	Midfielder	NorthEast United	
2021–22	Naorem Roshan Singh	Defender	Bengaluru	
2022–23	Sivasakthi Narayanan	Forward	Bengaluru	
2023–24	Vikram Partap Singh	Forward	Mumbai City^{†}	
2024–25	Brison Fernandes	Forward	Goa	

== Awards won by club ==
Club	Total
Kerala Blasters	3
Chennaiyin	2
Bengaluru	2
ATK	1
NorthEast United	1
Mumbai City	1
Goa	1

== See also ==
- Indian Super League
- Indian Super League Golden Boot
- Indian Super League Player of the League
- Indian Super League Golden Glove
- Indian Super League Winning Pass of the League
