= Indian Super League Golden Boot =

- Awarded for: The leading goalscorer in a given Indian Super League season
- Country: India
- Presented by: Indian Super League
- First award: 2014
- Currently held by: Youssef Ezzejjari

Highlights
- Most wins: Coro (2)
- Most consecutive wins: Coro (2)
- Most team wins: Chennaiyin; Goa (3 each)
- Most consecutive team wins: Chennaiyin; Goa (2 each)

The Indian Super League Golden Boot is an annual association football award presented to the leading goalscorer in the Indian Super League.

The Indian Super League was founded in 2013, eight teams competed in the 2014 inaugural season. It became the joint top-tier of Indian football league system by 2017–18 season and is the top-tier since 2022–23 season. Elano of Chennaiyin won the inaugural award in 2014. Coro won the Golden Boot award twice with Goa, more than any other player.

Bartholomew Ogbeche, Roy Krishna and Nerijus Valskis were the top scorers in the 2019–20 season with 15 goals each. In the assist count tiebreaker, both Krishna and Valskis were tied on six assists. Valskis was awarded the Golden Boot for a better goals-to-minutes ratio. Igor Angulo and Roy Krishna were the top scorers in the 2020–21 season with 14 goals each. Angulo won the award for a better goals-to-minutes ratio. Diego Maurício, Cleiton Silva and Dimitri Petratos were the top scorers in the 2022–23 season with 12 goals each. Maurício won the award for a better goals-to-minutes ratio.

== Winners ==
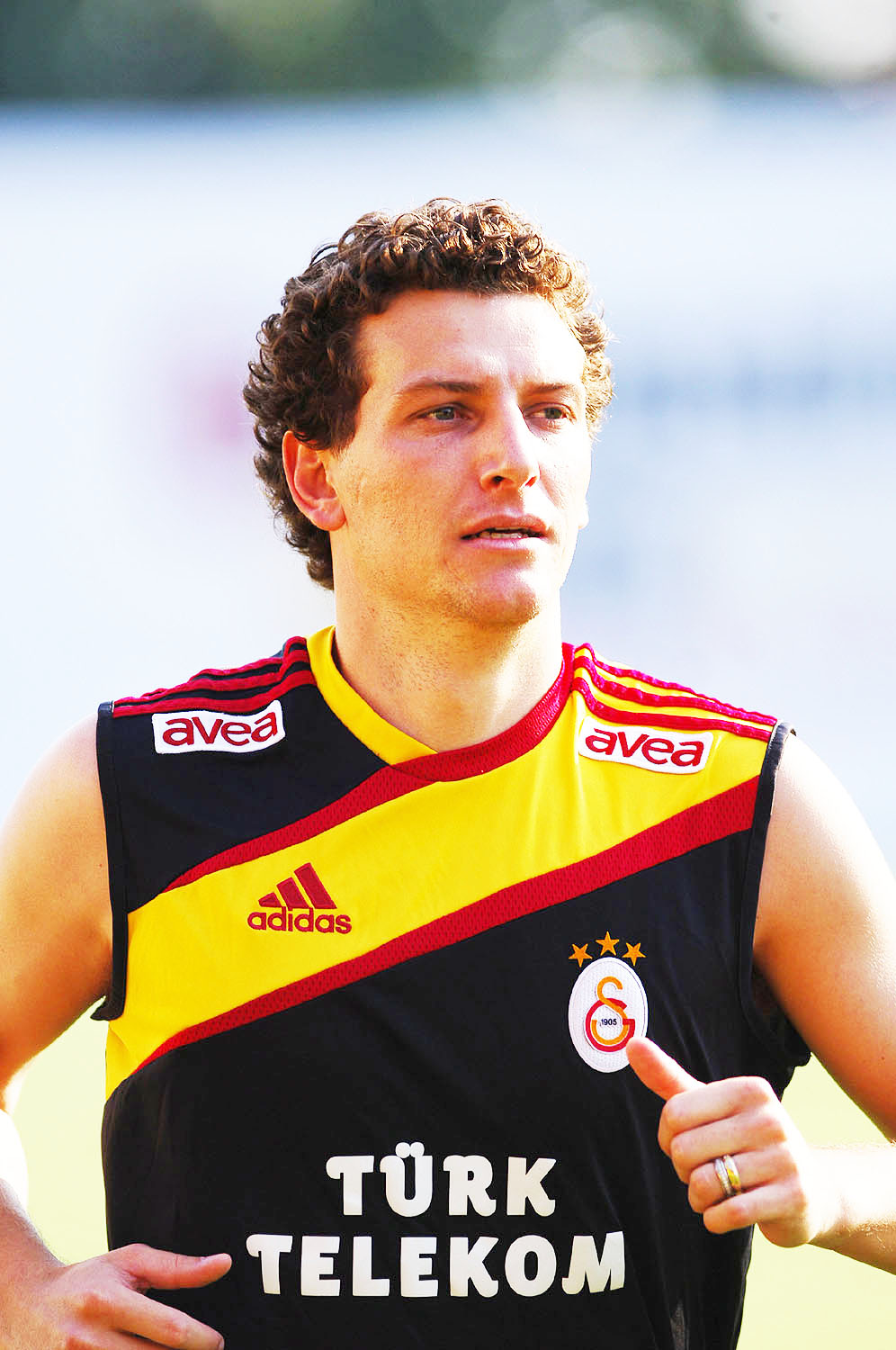
Elano won the inaugural Indian Super League Golden Boot in 2014.

Key
Player (X)	Name of the player and number of times they had won the award at that point (if more than one)
Matches	The number of Indian Super League matches played by the winner that season (Note: This does not necessarily match the total number of matches in a season.)
Rate	The winner's goals-to-matches ratio that season
†	Denotes the club were Indian Super League champions in the same season
#	Indian Super League record

Indian Super League Golden Boot Winners
Season	Player	Nationality	Club	Goals	Matches	Rate	Assists
2014	Elano	Brazil	Chennaiyin	8	11	0.73	1
2015	Stiven Mendoza	Colombia	Chennaiyin^{†}	13	16	0.81	3
2016	Marcelinho	Brazil	Odisha	10	15	0.67	5
2017–18	Coro	Spain	Goa	18	20	0.9	5
2018–19	Coro (2)	Spain	Goa	16	20	0.8	7
2019–20	Nerijus Valskis	Lithuania	Chennaiyin	15	20	0.75	6
2020–21	Igor Angulo	Spain	Goa	14	21	0.67	0
2021–22	Bartholomew Ogbeche	Nigeria	Hyderabad^{†}	18	20	0.9	1
2022–23	Diego Maurício	Brazil	Odisha	12	21	0.57	4
2023–24	Dimitrios Diamantakos	Greece	Kerala Blasters	13	17	0.76	3
2024–25	Alaaeddine Ajaraie	Morocco	NorthEast United	23^{#}	25	0.92	7
2025–26	Youssef Ezzejjari	Spain	East Bengal^{†}	11	13	0.85	0

== Awards won by nationality ==
Country	Players	Total
Spain	3	4
Brazil	3	3
Colombia	1	1
Lithuania	1	1
Nigeria	1	1
Greece	1	1
Morocco	1	1

== Awards won by club ==
Club	Total
Chennaiyin	3
Goa	3
Odisha	2
Hyderabad	1
Kerala Blasters	1
NorthEast United	1
East Bengal	1

== Joint top scorers ==
Season	Player	Nationality	Club	Goals	Matches	Rate
2019–20	Bartholomew Ogbeche	Nigeria	Kerala Blasters	15	16	0.94
2019–20	Roy Krishna	Fiji	ATK	15	21	0.71
2020–21	Roy Krishna	Fiji	ATK Mohun Bagan	14	23	0.61
2022–23	Cleiton Silva	Brazil	East Bengal	12	20	0.6
2022–23	Dimitri Petratos	Australia	Mohun Bagan SG	12	23	0.52
2023–24	Roy Krishna	Fiji	Odisha	13	25	0.52

== See also ==
- Indian Super League
- Indian Super League Golden Ball
- Indian Super League Golden Glove
- Indian Super League Emerging Player of the League
- Indian Super League Winning Pass of the League
