= Indian Super League =

Indian association football league

- Organising body: AIFF
- Founded: 21 October 2013; 13 years ago
- Country: India
- Confederation: AFC
- Number of clubs: 14
- Level on pyramid: 1
- Relegation to: Indian Football League
- Domestic cup(s): Federation Cup; Durand Cup
- International cup: AFC Challenge League
- Current champions: East Bengal (1st title) (2025–26)
- Most championships: ATK (3 titles)
- Most appearances: Sunil Chhetri (200)
- Top scorer: Sunil Chhetri (77)
- Broadcasters: Sony Sports; SonyLIV; YouTube
- Sponsor: MG
- Website: indiansuperleague.com
- Current: 2026–27 Indian Super League

The Indian Super League (ISL), officially known as the MG Indian Super League due to sponsorship ties with MG Motor, is a professional association football league in India and the highest level of the Indian football league system. Contested by 14 clubs, it operates on a system of promotion and relegation with the Indian Football League. It is administered by the All India Football Federation (AIFF).

Until 2024–25 the season usually ran from September to April and included a 24-round regular season, followed by the playoffs involving the top six, culminating with the ISL Final to determine the ISL Cup winners. At the end of the regular season, the club with the most points is declared the ISL League winners and presented with the League Winners' Shield. From 2025–26 season onwards the team with the most points at the end of season is awarded with the ISL Trophy. ISL clubs qualify for AFC continental club competitions, with the league champions earning qualification for the subsequent season's AFC Champions League Two qualifying playoffs.

The competition was founded on 21 October 2013 to grow the sport of football in India and increase its exposure in the country. Play began in October 2014 with eight teams. During its first three seasons, the competition operated without official recognition from the Asian Football Confederation (AFC), the governing body for the sport in Asia. It was structured along the same lines as the Indian Premier League, the country's biggest league. Each season lasted just three months, from October to December, and matches were held daily. However, before the 2017–18 season, the league expanded to ten clubs with Jamshedpur and Bengaluru joining, expanded its schedule to six months, and earned recognition from the AFC. Mohun Bagan and East Bengal joined the league in the 2020–21 season. With ATK disbanding, the 2020–21 season had 11 clubs competing.

The ISL attained sole top-tier league status from the 2022–23 season, with the I-League demoted to the second tier. The 2023–24 season saw directly promoted club from the I-League participating in the ISL for the first time. Punjab FC, as the 2022–23 I-League champions, became the 12th league member. In subsequent years, Mohammedan and Inter Kashi joined the league as the 13th and 14th club respectively, as champions of the I-League.

Since the league's inaugural season, six clubs have won the ISL trophy: ATK (3), Chennaiyin (2), Mumbai City (2), Mohun Bagan (2), Bengaluru (1), and Hyderabad (1), East Bengal (1). Since the introduction of the League Winners' Shield in the 2019–20 season, Mumbai City and Mohun Bagan have won it twice, while Goa and Jamshedpur have won it once each. In the 2024–25 season, Mohun Bagan became the first team to successfully defend the League Shield. Mohun Bagan also became the first team to earn 50 points or more in the league, setting a record with 56 points in the 2024–25 league season.

== History ==
Season	Champions	
2014	Atlético de Kolkata	
2015	Chennaiyin	
2016	Atlético de Kolkata (2)	
2017–18	Chennaiyin (2)	
2018–19	Bengaluru	
Season	Champions	Shield Winners
2019–20	ATK (3)	Goa
2020–21	Mumbai City	Mumbai City
2021–22	Hyderabad	Jamshedpur
2022–23	ATK Mohun Bagan	Mumbai City (2)
2023–24	Mumbai City (2)	Mohun Bagan SG
2024–25	Mohun Bagan SG (2)	Mohun Bagan SG (2)
Season	Champions	
2025–26	East Bengal	

=== Origins ===
Football in India has existed in many forms since the game first arrived in the country during the 19th century with the first nationwide club competition, the Durand Cup, beginning in 1888. Despite the long history of the game in India, the country's first nationwide football league did not begin until the semi-professional National Football League commenced in 1996. Before the creation of the National Football League, most clubs played in state leagues or select nationwide tournaments.

In 2006, the AIFF, the governing body for the sport in India, reformatted the league as the I-League to professionalize the game. However, during the following seasons, the league suffered from a lack of popularity due to poor marketing.

In September 2006, the AIFF signed a 10-year television and media contract with Zee Sports. Zee would broadcast the National Football League, later the I-League, and other tournaments organized by the AIFF and selected India's international matches. However, in October 2010, the deal between the AIFF and Zee Sports was terminated over payment and marketing disagreements.

On 9 December 2010, it was announced that the AIFF had signed a new 15-year, ₹700 crore deal with Reliance Industries and the International Management Group.

=== Foundation ===
The Indian Super League was officially launched on 21 October 2013 by IMG–Reliance, Star Sports, and the All India Football Federation. The competition was announced to take place from January 2014 to March 2014, but was postponed shortly thereafter to September 2014.

At first, it was announced that bidding for the eight Indian Super League teams would be completed before the end of 2013 and there was already high interest from major corporations, Indian Premier League teams, Bollywood stars, and other consortia. However, due to the rescheduling of the league, bidding was delayed to 3 March 2014. It was also revealed around this time that bidders would need to comply with financial requirements as well as promote football development within their area. Finally, in early April 2014, the winning bidders were announced. The selected cities/states were Bengaluru, Delhi, Goa, Guwahati, Kochi, Kolkata, Mumbai, and Pune. Former Indian cricket player Sachin Tendulkar, along with PVP Ventures, won the bidding for the Kochi franchise. Another former Indian cricket player, Sourav Ganguly, along with a group of Indian businessmen and La Liga side Atlético Madrid, won the bid for the Kolkata franchise. Meanwhile, Bollywood stars John Abraham, Ranbir Kapoor, and Salman Khan won the bid for the Guwahati, Mumbai, and Pune franchises respectively. Bengaluru and Delhi were won by companies while Goa was won by a partnership between Videocon, Dattaraj Salgaocar, and I-League side Dempo.

The first team to be launched officially was the Kolkata franchise as Atlético de Kolkata on 7 May 2014. On 7 July 2014, the team announced the first head coach in league history, Antonio López Habas. The next day, Kolkata also announced the first official marquee signing in the Indian Super League, UEFA Champions League winner Luis García.

Eventually, all eight teams were revealed as Atlético de Kolkata, Bangalore Titans, Delhi Dynamos, Goa, Kerala Blasters, Mumbai City, NorthEast United and Pune City. However, on 21 August 2014, it was announced that due to Bangalore's owners dropping out, Chennai would be given a franchise instead. The team was eventually named Chennaiyin FC. At the same time, the original marquee players were Luis García, Elano, Alessandro Del Piero, Robert Pires, David James, Freddie Ljungberg, Joan Capdevila, and David Trezeguet.

The inaugural season began on 12 October 2014 at the Salt Lake Stadium when Atlético de Kolkata defeated Mumbai City, 3–0. The first goal was scored by Fikru Teferra. The first Indian to score in the league was Balwant Singh for Chennaiyin FC.

=== Recognition and expansion (2014–2021) ===
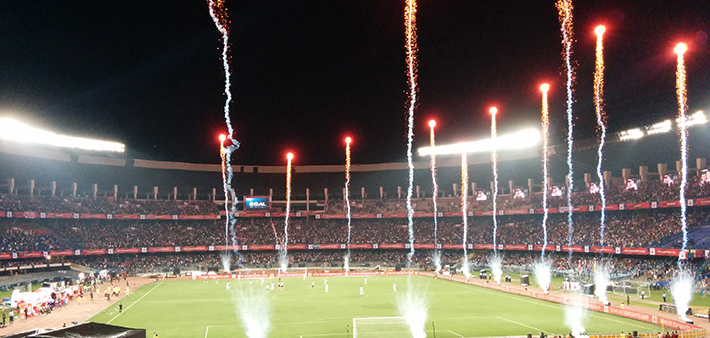
The first-ever ISL match being played at Vivekananda Yuba Bharati Krirangan.

For the first three seasons of the Indian Super League, the competition operated without official recognition from the governing body for football in Asia, the Asian Football Confederation (AFC), and the world football governing body FIFA. In October 2014, then FIFA Secretary General Jérôme Valcke stated that the world governing body only recognized the ISL as a tournament, not a league. The official league for football in India remained the I-League. With no recognition from the AFC, the teams also could not participate in Asian club competitions, the AFC Champions League or the AFC Cup.

During the first three seasons of the Indian Super League, attendance across the competition exceeded the expectations of pundits and the domestic I-League mainly due to the timing of the matches, mostly on working days, and extensive promotion. Television ratings were also strong for the competition, due to better commentary and telecasting, pre-match and post-match shows, as well as hourly reminders in various channels and social media interaction. However, despite the general success off the pitch, the competition drew criticism in other areas. Due to the need to accommodate the ISL into the Indian football calendar, the I-League season was shortened and went from having an October to May schedule to a January to May schedule. Indian players would play for both an ISL team and an I-League club while the I-League continued to suffer from a lack of visibility compared to the ISL. India's then head coach Stephen Constantine had called for both the ISL and I-League to either run together at the same time or merge.

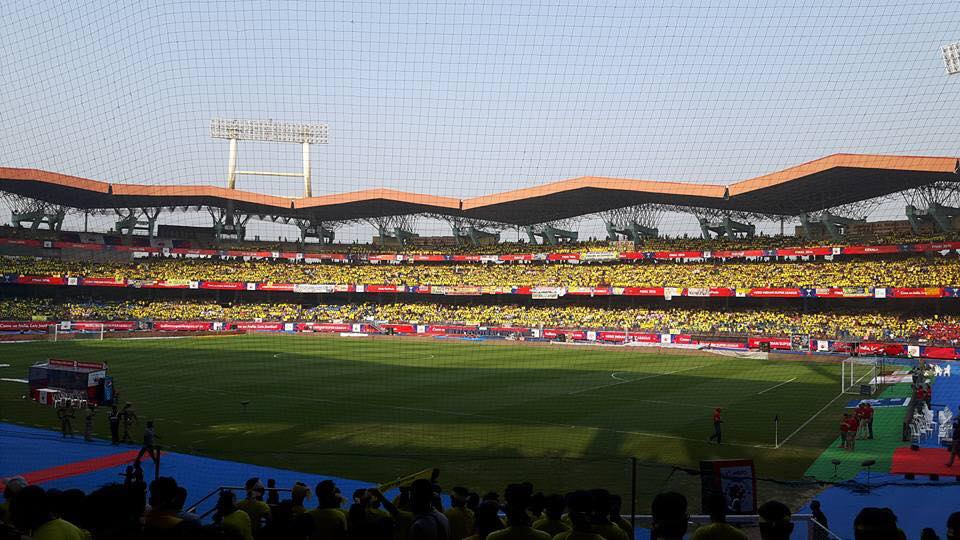
2016 ISL Final at Jawaharlal Nehru International Stadium, Kochi

For the first three seasons Atlético de Kolkata emerged as the dominant team by finishing in the top four every year, and winning the Final twice (2014 and 2016) by defeating Kerala Blasters both times.

On 18 May 2016, IMG–Reliance, along with the AIFF and I-League representatives met at a meeting in Mumbai. During the meeting, it was proposed that starting from the 2017–18 season, the Indian Super League become the top-tier football league in India while the I-League be reformed as League One and restructured as the second division. The competition would also expand by two teams and continue to operate without promotion and relegation, as stated earlier due to the 15 crore attraction of the FSDL each year, but run for 5–7 months instead of 2–3. The idea was not entertained by the I-League representatives.

In June 2017, IMG–Reliance, the AIFF and the I-League representatives met with the AFC in Kuala Lumpur in order to find a new way forward for Indian football. The AFC were against allowing the ISL as the main league in India, while I-League clubs East Bengal and Mohun Bagan wanted a complete merger of the ISL and I-League. A couple weeks later, the AIFF proposed that both Indian Super League and I-League run simultaneously on a short–term basis with the I-League champion retaining the AFC Champions League qualifying stage spot and the AFC Cup qualifying stage spot going to the ISL champion. The proposal from the AIFF was officially approved by the AFC on 25 July 2017, with the ISL replacing the domestic cup competition, the Federation Cup, a true knockout cup competition. It was also stated that the competition would now run for five months, starting with the 2017–18 season, expand to 10 teams.

A month before, on 11 May 2017, the ISL organizers started to accept bids for 2–3 new franchises for the 2017–18 season. The bids would be for ten cities, namely Ahmedabad, Bengaluru, Cuttack, Durgapur, Hyderabad, Jamshedpur, Kolkata, Ranchi, Siliguri and Thiruvananthapuram. It was also clarified that if Kolkata were to win at least one bid that the new Kolkata side would have to play away from the city for only two seasons. A month later, on 12 June, it was announced that I-League side, Bengaluru, and Tata Steel (for Jamshedpur) had won the bidding for the new teams.

On 22 September 2017, the competition announced officially that it would be extending its season by two months, thus making the league last for five months instead of three. The competition would also go from having matches played daily to being played between Wednesday and Sunday.

The next year, before the 2018–19 season, it was reported that Reliance Industries had bought out IMG's shares in the Football Sports Development. IMG realising that the robust business model will soon be exposed, pulled out, thus giving Reliance Industries 65% ownership while Star Sports retains 35%. In this season, Bengaluru had achieved the feat of being the first club to win the final after topping the league standings. Following the 2018–19 season, Pune City was disbanded in 2019. The club's franchise rights were then transferred to an ownership group which founded Hyderabad FC. In August 2019, Delhi Dynamos became the first ISL club to relocate when it moved from Delhi to Bhubaneswar and rebranded as Odisha FC.

On 14 October 2019, the AFC held a summit in Kuala Lumpur, chaired by the AFC Secretary General Windsor John, which involved key stakeholders from the AIFF, the FSDL, the ISL, and the I-League clubs, and other major stakeholders to propose a new roadmap to facilitate the football league system in India. Based on the roadmap, that was prepared by the AFC and the AIFF at the summit and approved by the AFC Executive Committee on 26 October in Da Nang, In 2019–20 season the Indian Super League will attain the country's top-tier league status and run parallelly with I-League, allowing the Indian Super League premiers to play in AFC Champions League and the I-League champions to play in AFC Cup. In addition, starting from the 2022–23 season the I—League lost top-tier status and the Indian Super League became the country's sole top-tier league. The champion of the I-League will stand a chance to be promoted to the Indian Super League with no participation fee, a basis fulfilling sporting merit and the national club licensing criteria to be set out by the AIFF, but there will not be relegation from Indian Super League up to the 2023–24 season. In its recommendation for 2024–25, it was agreed to fully implement promotion and relegation in between the two leagues, and abolition of the system of two parallel leagues. The club finishing at the top of the Indian Super League table was crowned the season's premiere, and Goa became the first to achieve the title in 2019–20 season.

Another key recommendation by the AFC in the roadmap was to open a pathway for two I-League clubs' entry into the Indian Super League by the end of the 2020–21 season, subject to the criteria being fulfilled. Therefore, efforts were taken early on by the organizers to include two historic clubs– Mohun Bagan and East Bengal into the league, which succeeded in the following season. Mohun Bagan entered the ISL in the 2020–21 season after KGSPL, the owners of ATK FC, officially disbanded ATK FC and acquired an 80% stake in the football division of Mohun Bagan in June 2020. In September 2020, Shree Cement acquired a 76% stake in East Bengal along with the sporting rights of the club and East Bengal entered the ISL in the same season.

=== Sole top-tier league status (2022–present) ===
Following the Indian football roadmap, the Indian Super League became the sole top-tier league in the country from the 2022–23 season. Before the 2023–24 season, Punjab became the first club to be promoted to the league from the I-League. Similarly, Mohammedan and Inter Kashi won the next I-Leagues and was promoted for 2024–25 and 2025–26 ISL season respectively.

The Indian football roadmap also recommended relegation to be adopted by the 2024–25 season. However, relegation was implemented in the ISL only during 2025–26 season and Mohammedan SC became the first-ever club to be relegated from the top-flight. They were relegated to the Indian Football League (formerly I-League) for the 2026–27 season, while the champions of the second division Diamond Harbour earned promotion to the ISL.

== Competition format ==
=== Regular season ===
The regular season of the Indian Super League usually runs from September to April (since the 2017–18 season). The competition consists of 24 rounds that follow a double round-robin format, with each club playing the others twice, once at their home stadium and once at their opponents' stadium, for a total of 24 matches each. Teams receive three points for a win, one point for a draw, and no points for a loss. Teams are ranked by total points. From the 2019–20 season, the team with the highest-ranked club at the end of the regular season had been awarded the League Winners' Shield up to 2024–25 season. From the 2025–26 season, the team finishing first in the league table is awarded the ISL trophy.

The position of each club is determined by the highest number of points accumulated during the regular season. If two or more clubs are level on points, the following criteria are applied:

1. Points accumulated head-to-head;
2. Goal difference head-to-head;
3. Goals scored head-to-head;
4. Highest goal difference;
5. Highest goals scored;
6. Lowest number of red cards accumulated;
7. Lowest number of yellow cards accumulated;
8. Toss of a coin.

The Indian Super League approved the 3+1 rule, limiting the maximum number of foreign players (3+1 from an AFC member nation. This rule was implemented in the 2021–22 season to increase participation of domestic players. However, following the AFC removing the rule in continental competitions, it was also scrapped by the ISL. This allowed clubs to register a maximum of six foreign players from any nation or region.

=== ISL playoffs ===
The top two clubs after the regular season automatically progress to the ISL Cup playoffs. The third-through-sixth ranked clubs play a single-elimination match hosted at the higher-ranked club's venue, with the two winners joining the first and second-ranked clubs in two-legged semifinals played over two weeks. The two winners eventually meet in the ISL Cup final hosted at the home stadium of the higher-ranked club since 2024. From the 2025–26 season, the playoffs stage is discarded.

Prize money (2023–24)

- Cup winners: ₹6 crore
- League Shield winners: ₹3.5 crore
- Cup runner-up: ₹3 crore
- Cup third place: ₹1.5 crore
- Cup fourth place: ₹1.5 crore

Indian Super League final host venues
Rank	Stadium	City	Capacity	No.	Year
1	Fatorda Stadium	Margao	19,000	5	2015, 2020, 2021, 2022, 2023
2	Vivekananda Yuba Bharati Krirangan	Kolkata	68,000	2	2024, 2025
3	DY Patil Stadium	Mumbai	55,000	1	2014
3	Jawaharlal Nehru International Stadium	Kochi	65,000 (reduced to 39,000 for ISL matches)	1	2016
3	Sree Kanteerava Stadium	Bangalore	25,800	1	2018
3	Mumbai Football Arena	Mumbai	18,000 (reduced to 7,000)	1	2019

=== Continental qualification ===
As of 2024, Indian Super League clubs can qualify for the AFC Champions League Two, the second tier AFC club competition, through their performance in the league. Previously ISL league winners had the opportunity to qualify for the top tier AFC club competition, the AFC Champions League but following the revamp of AFC club competitions, India lost the right to qualify for the top tier AFC Champions League Elite. Starting from the 2023–24 season, the ISL Champions will qualify to the group stage of AFC Champions League Two. Mohun Bagan will represent India in the 2024–25 AFC Champions League Two as the 2023–24 ISL Champions.

Before the 2017–18 season, the league was not recognized by the Asian Football Confederation (AFC), the governing body for football in Asia, so for the first three seasons no ISL team was eligible to participate in Asian competition. However, in June 2017, it was announced that the AFC, along with FIFA, would recognise the Indian Super League and allow clubs to participate in the AFC Cup starting in 2019.

Bengaluru became the first Indian Super League club to participate in Asian competition when they participated in the 2018 AFC Cup. The club qualified while still an I-League club and through winning the Federation Cup in 2017 but participated in the tournament as an ISL team after entering the league before the 2017–18 season. In March 2018, Chennaiyin became the first ISL side to qualify for the AFC Cup directly through the league. They qualified for the 2019 edition after winning the 2018 ISL final.

In October 2019, it was announced that the AFC had approved the proposed roadmap from the AIFF, which includes allowing the Indian Super League champion to qualify for the AFC Champions League qualifiers. A couple months later, in December 2019, it was officially announced by the AFC that they would be expanding the Champions League group stage from 32 teams to 40 and that the Indian Super League premier shall qualify directly for the group stage from the 2021 edition onwards. In total 3 spots in AFC club competitions are awarded to India based on the AFC club competitions ranking, including one for the winner of the Indian Super League Final in the AFC Cup qualifying play-offs and one for the champions of I-League, the other top-tier league, in the AFC Cup group stage. In February 2020, Goa became the first ISL club to qualify for the Champions League after they became the ISL Premiers of 2019–20. From the 2022–23 season has I-League ceased to be a top-tier league; hence, the AFC Cup group stage berth is now awarded to the winners of the Super Cup. Starting in 2024, the winners of the Super Cup will qualify for the AFC Champions League Two preliminary stage following the revamp of the AFC club competitions.

Extracted from the 2024 ranking of nations by their AFC club points
Rank 2024	Rank 2022	Change	Region	Association	2019	2021	2022	2024	Total	Places in AFC Champions League Elite (GS+PO)		Places in AFC Champions League Two (GS+PO)		Places in AFC Challenge League (GS+PO)	
Rank 2024	Rank 2022	Change	Region	Association	2019	2021	2022	2024	Total	GS	PO	GS	PO	GS	PO
15	15	—	8 (E)	Hong Kong	3.650	16.500	6.587	4.900	26.888	0	0	1	1	0	0
16	18	▲ +2	8 (W)	Bahrain	2.500	5.510	5.215	7.020	23.368	0	0	1	1	0	0
17	17	—	9 (W)	India	3.217	6.865	4.797	3.453	22.806	0	0	1	1	0	0
18	16	▼ -2	10 (W)	Tajikistan	3.000	13.955	2.493	2.230	22.493	0	0	1	1	0	0
19	20	▲ +1	11 (W)	Turkmenistan	5.267	3.125	2.640	3.463	20.217	0	0	0	1	1	0

Updated on 3 ^{rd} October 2024

=== Other competitions ===
In February 2018 it was announced by the AIFF that the Super Cup would be replacing the Federation Cup as Indian football's annual knockout football competition. Before the Super Cup, Indian Super League clubs did not play official matches outside of ISL (exception being Bengaluru in the 2018 AFC Cup) so the Super Cup was the first time clubs in the league played in an official cup tournament. The Super Cup was contested by all ten sides in the ISL and the top 10 sides from the I-League, the other top flight league in India, during its initial seasons. The top six teams from both leagues qualify automatically for the tournament proper while the bottom four participate in qualifiers. The first editions of the tournament were won by ISL clubs; namely Bengaluru and Goa.

The Super Cup was revived in 2023 with 16 clubs participating. All ISL clubs would participate and the remaining spots would be contested by I-League teams. The 2023 Super Cup was the first instance of the winner qualifying for an AFC club competition, with Odisha qualifying for the qualifier for 2023–24 AFC Cup group stage after defeating Bengaluru 2–1 in the final. Starting in 2024, the winners of the Super Cup will qualify for the AFC Champions League Two preliminary stage following the revamp of the AFC club competitions. East Bengal won the 2024 Super Cup and will participate in the 2024–25 AFC Champions League Two preliminary stage.

From 2019 onward, ISL clubs began to participate in Durand Cup on invitation. ATK, Bengaluru, Chennaiyin, Goa and Jamshedpur were the first ones to participate in the tournament, and 2019 Durand Cup was held as the de facto domestic cup tournament for that season after Super Cup was cancelled due to COVID-19 pandemic. In its next edition, Goa became the first club from ISL to win the cup. From 2022 onwards, AIFF and FSDL made it mandatory for all the clubs to participate in the Durand Cup, commencing at the beginning of every football season, thereby to fulfil the minimum number of games played by top-tier clubs set by AFC.

==== Reliance Foundation Development League ====
In June 2021 it was proposed by the organizers of ISL after a meeting with the CEOs of all the ISL clubs, that a new developmental league, called the Reliance Foundation Development League, would be introduced in 2022. This new league would consist of the youth and reserve teams of all the ISL clubs, with aim to develop young players as there has been a limited number of competitions and leagues outside the ISL since the start of the COVID-19 pandemic. The teams would predominantly feature U-21 players with few overage players allowed as well. The inaugural season of the proposed two-month league was to be held in Goa inside a bio-secure bubble between January and March, following the same medical and safety procedures for 2021–22 ISL season, but got postponed to 15 April. Out of all the ISL clubs, Mohun Bagan, East Bengal, NorthEast United and Odisha did not participate due to lack of youth teams, thus only seven clubs took part in the league along with Reliance Foundation Youth Champs football team. The league concluded on 12 May with Bengaluru topping the table and becoming the inaugural champions. Along with Bengaluru, Kerala Blasters qualified for Premier League's NextGen Cup 2022 in the UK as the top two teams in the league.

There was a huge increase in participation for the 2023 RFDL, with 59 clubs competing. Bengaluru FC retained their title after defeating Sudeva Delhi in the final. Along with the two finalists, Mohun Bagan and RYFC qualified for the Next Gen Cup.

Punjab FC won the 2024 RDFL and qualified for the Next Gen Cup alongside East Bengal and Muthoot FA.

=== Vision 2047 ===
The AIFF has broken down Vision 2047 into four-year strategic plans.

== Clubs ==
Thirteen clubs are competing in the 2026–27 season – twelve from the previous season, one replaced Jamshedpur and one promoted from the Indian Football League, later withdrew.

Locations of Indian Super League clubs
Location of Kolkata club tents and stadiums

Club	City	Position in 2025–26	First season	Seasons in ISL	ISL Cup	Recent ISL Cup	League Shield	Recent League Shield
Bengaluru	Bengaluru, Karnataka	4th	2017–18	9	1	2018–19	0	–
Chennaiyin	Chennai, Tamil Nadu	13th	2014	12	2	2017–18	0	–
Churchill Brothers	Margao, Goa	–	2026–27	–	–	–	–	–
Delhi	New Delhi, Delhi	12th	2025–26	1	0	–	0	–
East Bengal	Kolkata, West Bengal	1st	2020–21	6	1	2025–26	0	–
Goa	Margao, Goa	7th	2014	12	0	–	1	2019–20
Inter Kashi	Varanasi, Uttar Pradesh	10th	2025–26	1	0	–	0	–
Kerala Blasters	Kochi, Kerala	8th	2014	12	0	–	0	–
Mohun Bagan	Kolkata, West Bengal	2nd	2020–21	6	2	2024–25	2	2024–25
Mumbai City	Mumbai, Maharashtra	3rd	2014	12	2	2023–24	2	2022–23
NorthEast United	Guwahati, Assam	9th	2014	12	0	–	0	–
Odisha	Bhubaneswar, Odisha	11th	2019–20	7	0	–	0	–
Punjab	Mohali, Punjab	6th	2023–24	3	0	–	0	–

Promoted club

- Diamond Harbour (2025–26), later withdrew

Relegated club

- Mohammedan (2025–26)

Rebranded clubs
Club	City	Rebranded	First season	Last season	Seasons in ISL	ISL Cup	Recent ISL Cup
Delhi Dynamos	New Delhi, Delhi	Odisha	2014	2018–19	5	0	–
Hyderabad	Hyderabad, Telangana	Delhi	2019–20	2024–25	6	1	2021–22

Defunct clubs
Club	City	First season	Last season	Seasons in ISL	ISL Cup	Recent ISL Cup	League Shield	Recent League Shield
Pune City	Pune, Maharashtra	2014	2018–19	5	0	–	0	–
ATK	Kolkata, West Bengal	2014	2019–20	6	3	2019–20	0	–
Jamshedpur	Jamshedpur, Jharkhand	2017–18	2025–26	9	0	–	1	2021–22

=== Timeline ===
The Indian Super League is currently contested by 13 clubs. A total of 17 clubs have participated in the Indian Super League since its inception in 2014. Most of the clubs that have contested in this league were founded as franchise teams for the league. Six of these clubs have been competing in this league since its inaugural season. The league started with eight clubs but has now expanded to 13 clubs participating in it every season. The eight original clubs included Atlético de Kolkata (renamed as ATK FC), Chennaiyin, Delhi Dynamos (rebranded as Odisha FC), Goa, Kerala Blasters, Mumbai City, NorthEast United and Pune City. In the 2017–18 Indian Super League, two new teams, Bengaluru FC, which entered the league after having a successful spell in the I-League, and Jamshedpur FC, a newly formed franchise club, made their debuts in the league, increasing the number of participating teams from eight to ten. At the end of the 2018–19 Indian Super League, Pune City announced that it will be shutting down its operations. It was the first club in the history of the league to stop its operations. Its place was taken up by Hyderabad who took their place in the succeeding season. In the same season, Delhi Dynamos relocated to Bhubaneswar and rebranded itself as Odisha FC.

In 2020, the demand for the two Kolkata giants – East Bengal and Mohun Bagan – to be playing in Indian Super League increased. In June 2020, KGSPL, the owners of ATK, officially disbanded ATK and acquired an 80% stake in the football division of Mohun Bagan. Thus, Mohun Bagan joined the Indian Super League in the 2020-21 season. In September 2020, Shree Cement acquired a 76% stake in East Bengal along with the club's sporting rights and East Bengal also joined the ISL in the 2020–21 season. This increased the number of teams to eleven. In the 2023–24 season, Punjab FC became the first club to be promoted from the I-League to the ISL, taking the total number of clubs to 12. Mohammedan SC and Inter Kashi were promoted to the 2024–25 season and 2024–25 season as the 13th and 14th club respectively.

On 7 October 2025, Hyderabad FC announced their official relocation to Delhi and renamed their club to SC Delhi.

== Championships ==
As of the end of the 2024–25 season, 13 clubs have competed in the league, with six becoming ISL trophy winners and four earning the League Shield title. ATK remains the most successful ISL trophy winners with three titles, while Mumbai City and Mohun Bagan remain the joint most successful League Shield winners with two titles each. Mohun Bagan successfully defended their League Shield title in the 2024–25 season, while no team has yet defended their ISL trophy title. Mumbai City and Mohun Bagan are the only clubs to have won the double — becoming League Shield winners as well as ISL trophy winners — during the 2020–21 and 2024–25 seasons respectively.

Until the 2021–22 season, the ISL trophy winners were designated as champions, but from the 2022–23 season, the champions designation has been given to the league shield winners. From the 2025–26 season again, the champions designation has been transferred back to the ISL trophy winners.

=== League Shields and ISL Trophies by years ===
Season	Regular season	Playoffs			Top goalscorer(s)	Goals
Season	Winners (Note: Since the 2019–20 season, the club finishing top of the regular season table had been awarded the League Winners Shield upto 2024–25 season. Since 2025–26 season, the club finishing top of the league table is awarded the ISL Trophy. Playoff winners were awarded the ISL Trophy upto 2024–25 season.)	Winners	Score	Runners–up	Top goalscorer(s)	Goals
2014	Did not exist	ATK	1–0	Kerala Blasters	(Brazil) Elano	8
2015	Did not exist	Chennaiyin	3–2	Goa	(Colombia) Stiven Mendoza	13
2016	Did not exist	ATK (2)	1–1 (a.e.t, 4–3 p)	Kerala Blasters	(Brazil) Marcelinho	10
2017–18	Did not exist	Chennaiyin (2)	3–2	Bengaluru	(Spain) Coro	18
2018–19	Did not exist	Bengaluru	1–0	Goa	(Spain) Coro	16
2019–20	Goa	ATK (3)	3–1	Chennaiyin	(Nigeria) Bartholomew Ogbeche, (Lithuania) Nerijus Valskis, (Fiji) Roy Krishna	15
2020–21	Mumbai City	Mumbai City	2–1	Mohun Bagan	(Spain) Igor Angulo, (Fiji) Roy Krishna	14
2021–22	Jamshedpur	Hyderabad	1–1 (a.e.t, 3–1 p)	Kerala Blasters	(Nigeria) Bartholomew Ogbeche	18
2022–23	Mumbai City (2)	Mohun Bagan	2–2 (a.e.t, 4–3 p)	Bengaluru	(Brazil) Cleiton Silva, (Brazil) Diego Mauricio, (Australia) Dimitri Petratos	12
2023–24	Mohun Bagan	Mumbai City (2)	3–1	Mohun Bagan	(Greece) Dimitrios Diamantakos, (Fiji) Roy Krishna	13
2024–25	Mohun Bagan (2)	Mohun Bagan (2)	2–1 (a.e.t)	Bengaluru	(Morocco) Alaaeddine Ajaraie	23
2025–26	East Bengal	Not held			(Spain) Youssef Ezzejjari	11
2026–27						

=== ISL Trophies and League Shields by clubs ===
Club	Total Titles	ISL Trophies	Season(s)	League Shields	Season(s)
Mohun Bagan	4	2	2022–23, 2024–25	2	2023–24, 2024–25
Mumbai City	4	2	2020–21, 2023–24	2	2020–21, 2022–23
ATK^{^}	3	3	2014, 2016, 2019–20	—	—
Chennaiyin	2	2	2015, 2017–18	—	—
Goa	1	—	—	1	2019–20
Jamshedpur	1	—	—	1	2021–22
Bengaluru	1	1	2018–19	—	—
Hyderabad	1	1	2021–22	—	—
East Bengal	1	1	2025–26	—	—

^{^} Club now defunct

== Ownership ==
The Indian Super League has a similar ownership model where the teams are owned by prominent businessmen, as well as celebrity owners from Bollywood and cricket. The Indian Super League owners act as the league partners. British professional services group Ernst & Young were hired to draw up a criterion for the bidding process and approve the potential owners. In April 2014 the owners were announced. Bollywood stars such as Ranbir Kapoor, John Abraham, and Salman Khan were bid winners, as well as cricket stars Sachin Tendulkar and Sourav Ganguly. Football clubs such as Atlético Madrid and Shillong Lajong were also bid winners.

Despite careful selection, the Indian Super League has had trouble with team ownership. In August 2014, two months before the inaugural season, Sun Group, the owners of the Bangalore franchise, dropped out after the competition rejected their potential tie-up with then I-League club Bengaluru. Later that month, it was announced that another Bollywood star, Abhishek Bachchan, would take over the last franchise spot and move the team from Bangalore to Chennai. The competition had its first ownership switch on 1 June 2016, when Kerala Blasters announced their new ownership structure. Along with Sachin Tendulkar, they brought in businessman Nimmagadda Prasad and film stars Allu Aravind, Chiranjeevi, and Nagarjuna after PVP Ventures withdrew their stake in the team. In 2018, Tendulkar sold off his shares to the majority stakeholders in the club.

== Sponsorship and revenues ==
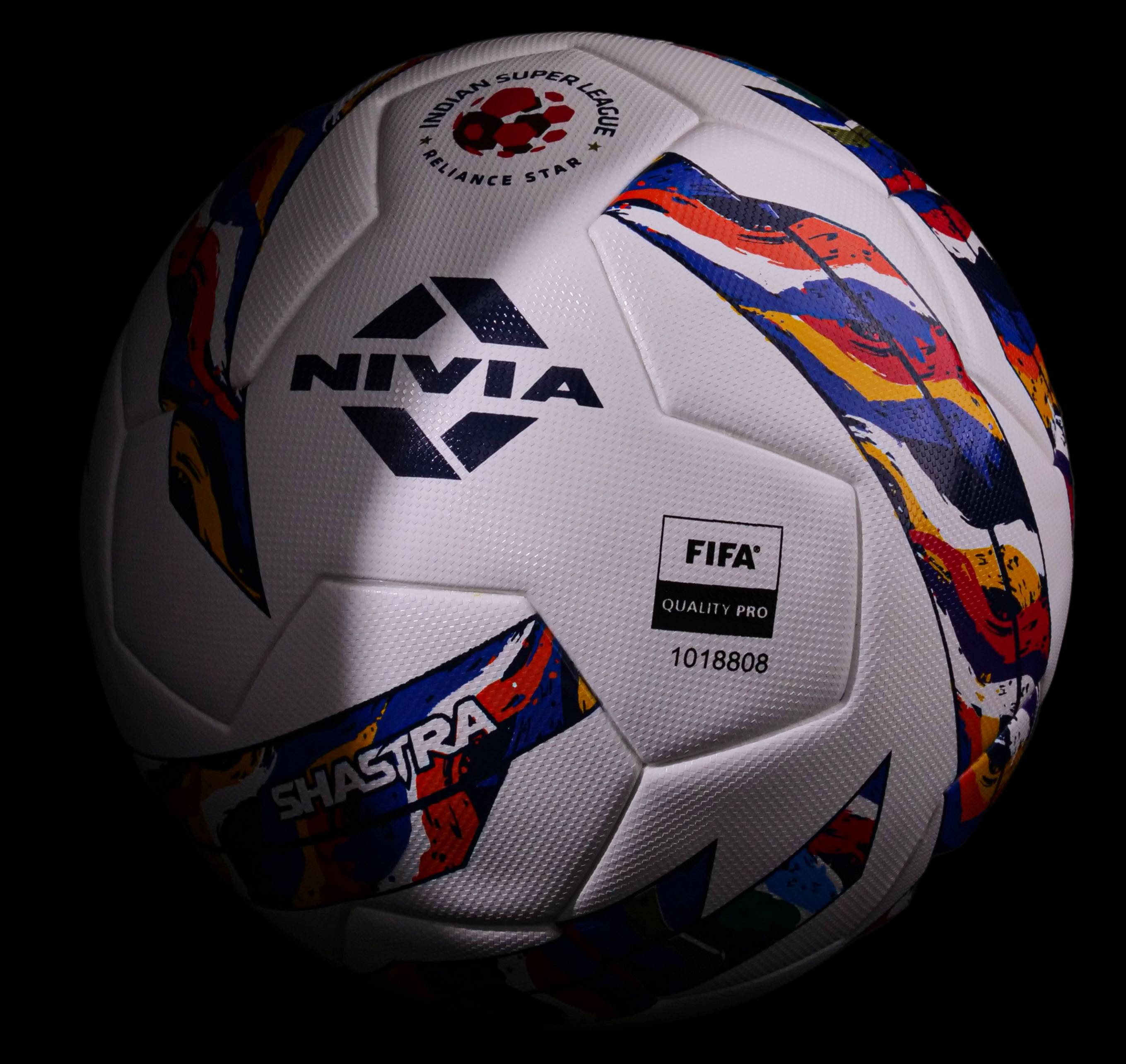
Nivia Sports sponsors ISL official ball

In 2014, Hero MotoCorp became the first title sponsor of the Indian Super League in a deal that would last through 2016. On 30 September 2014, a week before the first season, it was announced that Puma would be the official ball supplier of the Indian Super League. Nivia Sports took on the role of match ball sponsor from 2018. As of the 2024 season, Nivia Sports's Football Shastra 2.0 has been designated as the official match ball, continuing their involvement in the league by supplying this model for the next three years.

The competition relies heavily on a central sponsorship pool. League stakeholders manage it and market the competition to potential investors and sponsors. Twenty percent of the money gained in the central sponsorship pool goes towards organizing the competition, while the rest is divided among the clubs. Despite successfully gaining a lot of money through central sponsorship in 2014, 100% of the revenues were used to improve facilities. The next season saw a change, with the central sponsorship pool doubling to around 100 crore due to new competition–wide sponsorships with corporates such as Flipkart and DHL Express. Clubs were able to increase their intake with shirt sponsorship deals worth double from the previous season and around nine advertisements allowed. Teams in the league had also signed shirt manufacturing sponsorship deals with companies such as Adidas and Puma.

For the 2016 season, it was projected that the competition would gain more sponsors compared to the previous season, especially since it would occur during the Indian festive periods. For kit sponsorships, each club was allowed to have six.

On 23 July 2017, it was announced that Hero MotoCorp would extend their deal as the title sponsor of the Indian Super League for another three years. The company would spend $25 million during three years according to Nita Ambani, the league's chairperson.

On 9 June 2026, the AIFF accepted a club-led model to conduct the league for four seasons where each club would be paying ₹1.1 crore (US$120,000) for a total of ₹15.4 crore (US$1.6 million) per season. Former AIFF president, Praful Patel, and the sports minister, Mansukh Mandaviya, were present in the meeting.

On October 1, 2026, the Indian Super League officially announced JSW MG Motor India as the new title sponsor. The multi-year agreement, which is reportedly valued at over ₹25 crore, rebrands the tournament as the MG Indian Super League (MG ISL).

== Media coverage ==
=== Television ratings ===
Star Sports served as the official broadcaster of the league in India for the first nine seasons. In September 2014, it was announced that Star Sports would broadcast the ISL through eight channels in five languages in an attempt to reach 85% of the Indian television audience. The first match reportedly drew a television audience of 75 million views. The first week reportedly drew 170 million views in total. These numbers were 12 times more than what India drew for the 2014 FIFA World Cup and around 20–30 times more than what the India's then top-tier league drew on TEN Action. At the end of the first season, it was reported that the ISL drew a total of 429 million viewers across India, close to the Pro Kabaddi League, and two and a half times more than the FIFA World Cup. It was also reported that 57% of the viewers were women, and the Star Sports website gained 32 million visits during the tournament.

The league experienced a sharp growth in ratings after the 2016 season, with over 216 million viewers on television throughout. The 2016 final reportedly drew 41 million viewers, which was a 41% increase on the number of viewers who saw the 2015 final. Ratings in rural India meanwhile drew 101 million viewers.

For the 2017–18 season, Star Sports broadcast the league on Star Sports 2 and Star Sports 2HD in English. The broadcasters also televised the matches in Bangla, Malayalam, Kannada, Tamil, and other languages through various channels. The league streamed online via Disney+ Hotstar, Star India's online streaming service, and Jio TV.

ISL 2019–20 viewership recorded a 51 percent growth per BARC's report. ISL 2020–21 season saw a growth of 16% pan-India viewership from the last season numbers. ISL 2021–22 and 2022–23 seasons continued to gain steady growth.

=== Broadcasters ===
Broadcasters in India
Period	Television	Digital
2014–15	Star Sports, Star Gold, Star Utsav, Asianet Movies, Star Jalsha Movies, Star Suvarna Plus	Starsports.com
2015–17	Star Sports, Star Gold, Asianet Movies, Star Jalsha Movies, Star Suvarna Plus, Jaya Max	Hotstar
2017–18	Star Sports, Star Gold, Asianet Movies, Star Jalsha Movies, Star Suvarna Plus, Star Maa Gold	Disney+ Hotstar
2018–19	Star Sports, Star Gold, Asianet Plus, Star Jalsha Movies, Star Suvarna Plus, Star Maa Gold	Disney+ Hotstar
2019–20	Star Sports, Star Gold, Asianet Plus, Star Jalsha Movies	Disney+ Hotstar
2023–24	Sports18, VH1, Surya Movies, DD Bangla, Colors Bangla Cinema, News18 Kerala	JioCinema
2024–25	Star Sports, Asianet Plus	JioHotstar
2025–26	Sony Sports	FanCode
2026–present	Sony Sports	YouTube, Sony Liv

== Stadiums ==
Since the competition began in 2014, there have been a variety of stadiums used to host matches. DY Patil Stadium in Navi Mumbai and Jawaharlal Nehru Stadium are mainly used as cricket venues. The other stadiums were athletic (Fatorda Stadium, Vivekananda Yuba Bharati Krirangan (VYBK), Indira Gandhi Athletic Stadium in Guwahati, Jawaharlal Nehru Stadium (Chennai), Jawaharlal Nehru Stadium (Delhi)).

For the 2016 season, two new stadiums were used in the competition, Mumbai Football Arena and Rabindra Sarobar Stadium. Mumbai Football Arena replaced DY Patil Stadium. ATK moved to Rabindra Sarobar Stadium when VYBK was being renovated for the 2017 FIFA U-17 World Cup.

For the 2017–18 season, addition of Bengaluru and Jamshedpur added two new stadiums to the competition. Bengaluru would host matches at Sree Kanteerava Stadium while Jamshedpur would play at JRD Tata Sports Complex. Although Kolkata clus have East Bengal Ground, Mohammedan Sporting Ground and Mohun Bagan Ground respectively, they prefer to use VYBK. Mohammedan plays non-derby matches at Kishore Bharati Krirangan.

Home stadiums of current clubs
Bengaluru FC	Chennaiyin FC	East Bengal FC, Mohun Bagan SG	FC Goa
Sree Kanteerava Stadium, Bengaluru	Marina Arena, Chennai	Vivekananda Yuba Bharati Krirangan, Kolkata	Fatorda Stadium, Margao
Capacity: 25,800	Capacity: 30,000	Capacity: 68,000	Capacity: 30,000
SC Delhi	Jamshedpur FC	Kerala Blasters FC	Mohammedan SC, Inter Kashi FC
Ambedkar Stadium, New Delhi	JRD Tata Sports Complex, Jamshedpur	Kaloor Stadium, Kochi	Kishore Bharati Krirangan, Kolkata
Capacity: 35,000	Capacity: 24,424	Capacity: 41,000	Capacity: 12,000
Mumbai City FC	NorthEast United FC	Odisha FC	Punjab FC
Mumbai Football Arena, Mumbai	IG Athletic Stadium, Guwahati	Kalinga Stadium, Bhubaneswar	Jawaharlal Nehru Stadium, Delhi
Capacity: 7,000	Capacity: 25,000	Capacity: 12,000	Capacity: 60,000

== Coaches ==
Managers or head coaches influence varies from club to club and is related to the ownership. An AFC Pro Diploma or equivalent coaching license is required in the ISL. Caretaker manager can be appointed to fill the gap between the managerial departure and a new appointment.

Sergio Lobera holds the record for most matches coached in the Indian Super League with 126. Lobera, José Francisco Molina, and Antonio López Habas have been the most successful head coaches in the Indian Super League, with three titles each. Lobera has won two ISL League Shields and one ISL Cup, while Molina and Habas have won one ISL League Shield and two ISL cups. Habas and Lobera also share the record of managing the most teams in the Indian Super League, having taken charge of four different clubs. Habas has managed ATK, Pune City, Mohun Bagan, and Inter Kashi, while Lobera has managed FC Goa, Mumbai City, Odisha, and Mohun Bagan.

Current head coaches
Nat	Head coach	Club	Appointed	Time as head coach
(Spain)	Pep Muñoz	Bengaluru	25 March 2026	241 days
(India)	Clifford Miranda	Chennaiyin	18 October 2025	1 year, 34 days
(Cyprus)	Dimitris Dimitriou	Churchill Brothers	18 July 2026	126 days
(Poland)	Tomasz Tchórz	Delhi	19 October 2025	1 year, 33 days
(Spain)	Antonio López Habas	East Bengal	7 July 2026	137 days
(Spain)	Ángel Viadero	Goa	15 November 2026	6 days
(Portugal)	Carlos Vaz Pinto	Inter Kashi	7 October 2026	45 days
(England)	Ashley Westwood	Kerala Blasters	27 March 2026	239 days
(Greece)	Panagiotis Dilberis	Mohun Bagan SG	18 July 2026	126 days
(England)	Ashvir Singh Johal	Mumbai City	14 November 2026	7 days
(Spain)	Juan Pedro Benali	NorthEast United	22 May 2023	3 years, 183 days
(India)	T. G. Purushothaman	Odisha	7 February 2026	287 days
(Greece)	Pavlos Dermitzakis	Punjab	18 July 2026	126 days

== Players ==
=== Appearances ===
As of 21 November 2026

Most appearances
Rank	Player	Apps	Years
1	(India) Sunil Chhetri	200	2015–
2	(India) Pritam Kotal	196	2014–
2	(India) Amrinder Singh	196	2015–
4	(India) Rahul Bheke	191	2014–
5	(India) Lallianzuala Chhangte	186	2016–
6	(India) Subhasish Bose	183	2017–
7	(India) Gurpreet Singh Sandhu	182	2014–
8	(India) Mandar Rao Dessai	179	2017–
9	(India) Sandesh Jhingan	177	2014–
10	(India) Manvir Singh	176	2014–

=== Transfer regulations and foreign players ===
Player transfers may only take place within transfer windows set by the AIFF and approved by the FIFA. The two transfer windows run from 9 June to 31 August and from 1 January to 31 January. Player registrations cannot be exchanged outside these windows except under a specific license from the AIFF, usually on an emergency basis; if a player is injured and ruled out for at least two months, the club can permanently replace him, also if the club terminates the contract of a registered player, then a replacement can be signed. Although loan transfers and registrations can take place even outside the transfer windows.

During the initial seasons, the no. of foreigners in a squad varied from 7–10, which was gradually reduced as the league achieved AFC and FIFA recognition, and the organizers emphasized more on developing Indian players. As of 2024–25, a club can have a maximum squad strength of 35 men, including at most 6 foreigners, and a minimum of 3 registered goalkeepers. Previously, it was mandated for one of the foreigners to be from an AFC member nation, but following the AFC removing the need of such a player in Asian continental competitions, the ISL also removed the rule.

A club can also have an injury replacement for a domestic player. If a club registers less than 35 players by the end of the window, they can still fill the quota post the stipulated date provided the player is a free agent. Football Sports Development Limited (FSDL) also mandated the clubs to sign at least 4 under-21 players, with a minimum of 2 of them being a part of the matchday squad.

Previously, it was also mandatory for the clubs to get the approval of the league for three of their foreign signings, wherein players who played a minimum of 1000 minutes last season were automatically approved. But this rule was later scrapped and the clubs no longer need to approach the organisers for approval.

=== Top scorers ===
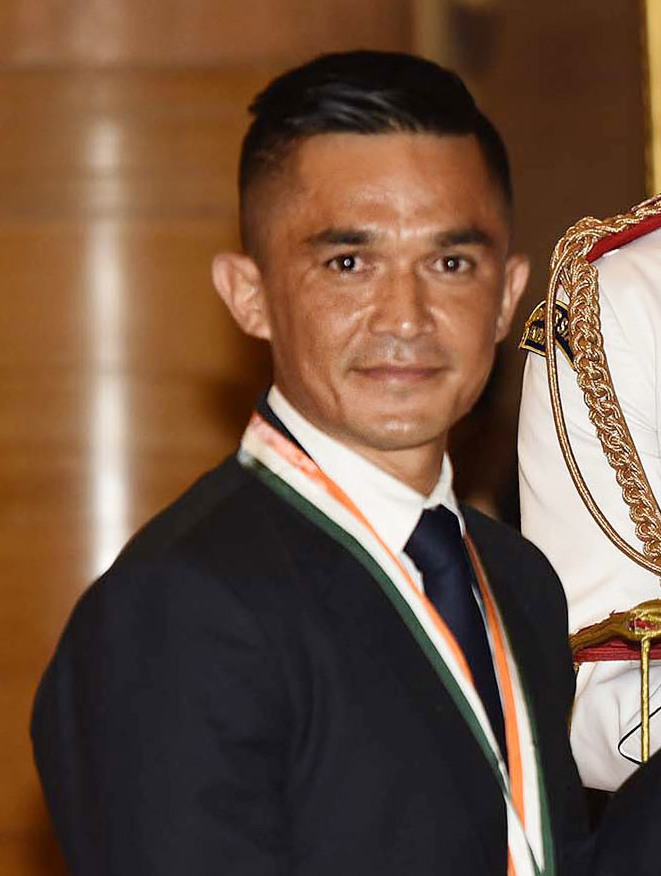
Sunil Chhetri is the top scorer in Indian Super League history with 77 goals.

As of 21 November 2026

Rank	Player	Goals	Apps	Ratio	Years
1	(India) **Sunil Chhetri**	77	200	0.39	2015–
2	(Nigeria) Bartholomew Ogbeche	63	98	0.64	2018–2023
3	(Fiji) Roy Krishna	58	116	0.5	2019–2025
4	(India) **Lallianzuala Chhangte**	50	186	0.27	2016–
5	(Spain) Coro	48	57	0.84	2017–2020
6	(Brazil) Diego Maurício	47	94	0.5	2020–2025
7	(Brazil) Cleiton Silva	36	97	0.37	2020–2025
7	(France) Hugo Boumous	36	126	0.29	2018–2025
9	(Brazil) Marcelinho	34	87	0.39	2016–2022
10	(Argentina) Jorge Pereyra Díaz	33	84	0.39	2021–2026

Bold denotes players still playing in the Indian Super League.

=== Wages ===
Every club has to follow a squad salary cap of ₹18 crores (≈ $2.15 million), which includes individual performance bonuses, agent/intermediary fees, and other arrangements with the players, although loan wages and transfer fees are not included within the salary cap. The league also allows the clubs to exclude two players from the salary cap value. Failing to follow the regulations, a club may risk deduction of points, fines, or sanctions.

== Awards ==
=== Trophy ===
The Indian Super League trophy was unveiled on 5 October 2014 by Nita Ambani, the founder and chairperson of the Football Sports Development. At the trophy unveiling occasion Ambani said, "It's a momentous day for all of us today as I stand along with the world's footballing legends to unveil the pride of Indian Super League. As these role models have inspired hundreds of thousands of players worldwide, I am sure the ISL trophy will also stand as a symbol of aspiration for many youngsters in an emergent India". Designed by Frazer and Haws, the ISL trophy stands 26 inches tall. The logo on the top band has the ISL colors assigned, and the handles are ornately carved and embellished with 24 carats of gold gilt to imbue a sense of pride.

=== League Winners Shield ===
On 19 February 2020, the FSDL unveiled the League Winners Shield for the ISL premiers to be awarded from 2019 to 2020 season. The League Winners' Shield, weighing approx. 5 kg with a diameter of 22 inches draws inspiration from global football traditions and design tones of the ISL Cup. The wreath carved around the silver football symbolizes the victors of The beautiful game.

=== Individual awards ===
In addition to the League Winners' Shield and the ISL trophy, the organizers also issue other awards throughout the season. A Man of the Match award, referred to as the Hero of the Match due to sponsorship reasons, is presented to the player who had the most impact in an individual match. Monthly awards are also given for the Hero of the Month and Emerging Player of the Month. These are issued after each season for the Hero of the League and the Emerging Player of the League. The Golden Boot is awarded to the top goalscorer of each season, the Winning Pass of the League award is presented to the top assist provider of each season, and the Golden Glove is awarded to the goalkeeper with the most clean sheets in a season.

== Partnerships ==
- Strategic partnership with the Premier League
- Partnership with London-based Terra Virtua Limited, exclusive non-fungible token (NFT) as digital collectibles ahead of the 2021–22 season
- NODWIN Gaming on 26 October 2021 announced the launch of eISL in collaboration with EA Sports

== See also ==
Preceded by I-League	Division 1 Football League in India; 2022–present	Succeeded by Incumbent

- Sport in India
- Football in India
- History of football in India
- India national football team
- Indian Super League playoffs
- Super Cup
- Durand Cup
- Indian Football League
- I-League 2
- I-League 3
- Indian State Leagues
- Indian Women's League
- List of Indian football champions
- List of Indian Super League coaches
- Indian football clubs in Asian competitions
