= Indian Super League Golden Glove =

Annual award given to the best goalkeeper in the Indian Super League

- Awarded for: The most clean sheets in a given Indian Super League season
- Country: India
- Presented by: Indian Super League
- First award: 2014
- Currently held by: Hrithik Tiwari

Highlights
- Most wins: Gurpreet Singh Sandhu; Vishal Kaith (2 each)
- Most consecutive wins: Gurpreet Singh Sandhu (2)
- Most team wins: Mohun Bagan (3)
- Most consecutive team wins: Bengaluru (2)

The Indian Super League Golden Glove is an annual association football award presented to the goalkeeper who has kept the most clean sheets in the Indian Super League.

The Indian Super League was founded in 2013, eight teams competed in the 2014 inaugural season. It became the joint top-tier of Indian football league system by 2017–18 season and is the top-tier since 2022–23 season.

Inaugural Indian Super League Golden Glove was awarded to Jan Šeda of Goa in 2014. While Gurpreet Singh Sandhu and Vishal Kaith won the golden glove the most (2 times each), Amrinder Singh was the first Indian player to win the award with Mumbai City in 2016, and Prabhsukhan Singh Gill was the youngest to win the award at 21 years and 3 months with Kerala Blasters.

== Winners ==
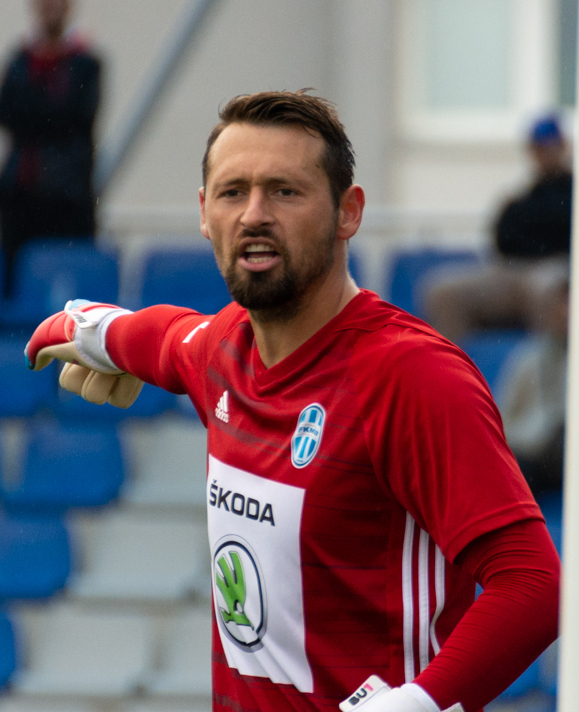
Jan Šeda won the inaugural Indian Super League Golden Glove in 2014.

Key
Player (X)	Name of the player and number of times they had won the award at that point (if more than one)
Matches	The number of Indian Super League matches played by the winner that season (Note: This does not necessarily match the total number of matches in a season.)
†	Denotes the club were Indian Super League champions or ISL Cup winners in the same season
#	Indian Super League record
M/G	Minutes per goal conceded

Indian Super League Golden Glove Winners
Season	Player	Nationality	Club	Clean sheets	Games	M/G
2014	Jan Šeda	Czech Republic	Goa	6	14	143.33
2015	Apoula Edel	Armenia	Chennaiyin^{†}	6	13	90
2016	Amrinder Singh	India	Mumbai City	5	6	180
2017–18	Subrata Pal	India	Jamshedpur	7	18	102.4
2018–19	Gurpreet Singh Sandhu (1)	India	Bengaluru^{†}	7	20	96.32
2019–20	Gurpreet Singh Sandhu (2)	India	Bengaluru	11	19	122.4
2020–21	Arindam Bhattacharya	India	Mohun Bagan	10	23	108.95
2021–22	Prabhsukhan Singh Gill	India	Kerala Blasters	7	20	83.52
2022–23	Vishal Kaith (1)	India	Mohun Bagan^{†}	12	24	115.53
2023–24	Phurba Lachenpa	India	Mumbai City^{†}	9	22	108.35
2024–25	Vishal Kaith (2)	India	Mohun Bagan^{†}	15#	26	124.74
2025–26	Hrithik Tiwari	India	Goa	5	10	128.57

== Awards won by nationality ==
Country	Players	Total
India	8	10
Czech Republic	1	1
Armenia	1	1

== Awards won by club ==
Club	Total
Mohun Bagan	3
Bengaluru	2
Mumbai City	2
Goa	2
Chennaiyin	1
Kerala Blasters	1
Jamshedpur	1

== See also ==
- Indian Super League
- Indian Super League Golden Ball
- Indian Super League Golden Boot
- Indian Super League Emerging Player of the League
- Indian Super League Winning Pass of the League
