= 2016 Baltic Cup =

International football competition

Tournament details
- Host country: Estonia; Latvia; Lithuania
- Dates: 29 May – 4 June
- Teams: 3
- Venues: 3 (in 3 host cities)

Final positions
- Champions: Latvia (12th title)
- Runners-up: Lithuania
- Third place: Estonia

Tournament statistics
- Matches played: 3
- Goals scored: 5 (1.67 per match)
- Top scorer(s): (Lithuania) Fiodor Černych (2 goals)

The 2016 Baltic Cup was the 26th football competition for men's national football teams organised by the Baltic states. The tournament, held between 29 May and 4 June 2016, was hosted in Estonia, Latvia and Lithuania, and was won by Latvia.

== Standings ==
Pos	Team	Pld	W	D	L	GF	GA	GD	Pts	
1	Latvia	2	1	1	0	2	1	+1	4	Winners
2	Lithuania	2	1	0	1	3	2	+1	3	
3	Estonia	2	0	1	1	0	2	−2	1	

Updated to match(es) played on unknown. Source: Soccerway

== Matches ==
29 May 2016
16:00
(UTC+3)

Lithuania	2–0	Estonia
Valskis 30'; Černych 45'	Report

Klaipėda Central Stadium, Klaipėda
Attendance: 3,700
Referee: Aleksandrs Anufrijevs (Latvia)
1 June 2016
19:30
(UTC+3)

Latvia	2–1	Lithuania
Zjuzins 51'; Rudņevs 72'	Report	Černych 84'

Daugava Stadium, Liepāja
Referee: Roomer Tarajev (Estonia)
4 June 2016
19:00
(UTC+3)

Estonia	0–0	Latvia
	Report

Lilleküla Stadium, Tallinn
Attendance: 1,982
Referee: Gediminas Mažeika (Lithuania)

== Winners ==
2016 Baltic Football Cup winners

Latvia
Twelfth title

== Statistics ==
=== Goalscorers ===
There were 5 goals scored in 4 matches, for an average of 1.25 goals per match.

2 goals

- (Lithuania) Fiodor Černych

1 goal

- (Latvia) Artjoms Rudņevs
- (Latvia) Artūrs Zjuzins
- (Lithuania) Nerijus Valskis
