= EE Guineueta =

Association football club in Spain

Guineueta
- Full name: Escola Esportiva Guineueta
- Nickname: Guine
- Founded: 1961
- Ground: CEM Guineueta, Barcelona, Catalonia, Spain
- Capacity: 2,000
- President: José Centeno
- Manager: Sergio Arana
- League: Segona Catalana – Group 3
- 2024–25: Primera Catalana – Group 2, 16th of 16 (relegated)
- Website: www.eeguineueta.cat
Home colours	Away colours

Escola Esportiva Guineueta is a football team based in Barcelona. Founded in 1961, they play in Segona Catalana – Group 3, holding home matches at the Complex Esportiu Municipal Guineueta.

== History ==
AD Guineueta was founded in 1961, with a rival team Sociedad Recreativa Atlético Guineueta being founded three years later; both teams merged in June 1974, establishing UD Guineueta. This club had a senior side in the regional leagues, and merged with Patronato de Escuelas Cívico Deportivas in June 1993, forming CEE Guineueta.

In 2010, Guineueta absorbed UD Buen Pastor, expanding their youth sides and being now named EE Guineueta. In June 2021, the club achieved a first-ever promotion to Tercera División RFEF.

=== Club background ===
- Agrupación Deportiva Guineueta - (1961–1974)
- Unión Deportiva Guineueta - (1974–1993)
- Club Escola Esportiva Guineueta - (1993–2010)
- Escola Esportiva Guineueta - (2010–)

== Season to season ==
Season	Tier	Division	Place	Copa del Rey
1961–1973	—	Regional	—	
1973–74	7	3ª Reg.	2nd	
1974–75	6	2ª Reg.	20th	
1975–76	7	3ª Reg.	1st	
1976–77	6	2ª Reg.	6th	
1977–78	7	2ª Reg.	4th	
1978–79	7	2ª Reg.	4th	
1979–80	7	2ª Reg.	7th	
1980–81	7	2ª Reg.	5th	
1981–82	7	2ª Reg.	4th	
1982–83	7	2ª Reg.	1st	
1983–84	6	1ª Reg.	2nd	
1984–85	5	Reg. Pref.	14th	
1985–86	5	Reg. Pref.	11th	
1986–87	5	Reg. Pref.	16th	
1987–88	6	1ª Reg.	17th	
1988–89	7	2ª Reg.	7th	
1989–90	7	2ª Reg.	1st	
1990–91	7	2ª Reg.	16th	
1991–92	8	2ª Terr.	4th	

Season	Tier	Division	Place	Copa del Rey
1992–93	8	2ª Terr.	8th	
1993–94	8	2ª Terr.	11th	
1994–95	8	2ª Terr.	4th	
1995–96	8	2ª Terr.	6th	
1996–97	8	2ª Terr.	4th	
1997–98	8	2ª Terr.	5th	
1998–99	8	2ª Terr.	1st	
1999–2000	7	1ª Terr.	9th	
2000–01	7	1ª Terr.	16th	
2001–02	8	2ª Terr.	15th	
2002–03	8	2ª Terr.	5th	
2003–04	8	2ª Terr.	8th	
2004–05	8	2ª Terr.	5th	
2005–06	8	2ª Terr.	13th	
2006–07	8	2ª Terr.	14th	
2007–08	8	2ª Terr.	9th	
2008–09	8	2ª Terr.	10th	
2009–10	8	2ª Terr.	9th	
2010–11	7	1ª Terr.	8th	
2011–12	6	2ª Cat.	9th	

Season	Tier	Division	Place	Copa del Rey
2012–13	6	2ª Cat.	13th	
2013–14	6	2ª Cat.	3rd	
2014–15	6	2ª Cat.	5th	
2015–16	6	2ª Cat.	7th	
2016–17	6	2ª Cat.	3rd	
2017–18	6	2ª Cat.	1st	
2018–19	5	1ª Cat.	5th	
2019–20	5	1ª Cat.	6th	
2020–21	5	1ª Cat.	1st	
2021–22	5	3ª RFEF	17th	
2022–23	6	1ª Cat.	5th	
2023–24	6	Lliga Elit	15th	
2024–25	7	1ª Cat.	16th	
2025–26	8	2ª Cat.		

- 1 season in Tercera División RFEF
