= 2022–23 Real Kashmir FC season =

Real Kashmir
2022–23 season
- Chairman: (India) Sandeep Chattoo
- Head coach: (India) Mehrajuddin Wadoo (until 1 February 2023) (England) Gifton Noel-Williams (from 8 February 2023)
- Stadium: TRC Turf Ground, Srinagar, Jammu and Kashmir
- I-League: 5th
- Super Cup: Qualifiers
- Top goalscorer: League: Samuel Kynshi (6 goals); All: Samuel Kynshi (6 goals)
- Highest home attendance: 4,123 (vs Churchill Brothers)
- Lowest home attendance: 538 (vs Aizawl)
- Average home league attendance: 2,859
- Biggest win: 2–0 (vs Rajasthan United (H), 19 November 2022, I-League); 4–2 (vs Sudeva Delhi (H), 8 February 2023, I-League); 2–0 (vs TRAU (A), 26 February 2023, I-League)
- Biggest defeat: 2–0 (vs Gokulam Kerala (A), 20 January 2023, I-League); 2–0 (vs RoundGlass Punjab (A), 27 January 2023, I-League)
Home colours	Away colours
- All statistics correct as of 11 March 2023.

The 2022–23 season was the sixth season in Real Kashmir FC's existence and their fifth season in I-League. This season of the I-League witnessed the return of the home-away format of the matches similar to that of the 2019–20 I-League season after a break of two years due to the COVID-19 pandemic in the country.

== First-team squad ==
As of 29 September 2022

Note: Flags indicate national team as defined under FIFA eligibility rules; some limited exceptions apply. Players may hold more than one non-FIFA nationality.

No.	Pos.	Nation	Player
1	GK	IND	Subhasish Roy Chowdhury (Captain)
3	DF	IND	Akashdeep Singh
4	DF	GHA	Richard Osei Agyemang
5	DF	IND	Balwinder Singh
6	MF	IND	Lalnuntluanga Bawitlung
8	MF	GHA	Wadudu Yakubu
9	FW	GHA	Ibrahim Nurudeen
11	MF	IND	Samuel Kynshi
12	MF	IND	Owais Bashir
13	MF	IND	Nestor Dias
14	MF	IND	Adnan Ayub
16	MF	IND	Mohammad Inam
17	FW	IND	Phrangki Buam
18	MF	IND	Loken Meitei
19	FW	IND	Parveez Hussain Parray
20	DF	IND	Joyner Lourenco
22	DF	IND	Kamalpreet Singh

No.	Pos.	Nation	Player
23	MF	IND	Rupert Nongrum
24	DF	IND	Jestin George (on loan from NorthEast United)
26	FW	GHA	Ernest Boateng
27	DF	IND	Paolenmang Tuboi
28	DF	IND	Jayraj Ghelani
30	FW	IND	Reuben Letkhontinchon
31	DF	IND	Shahid Nazir
32	DF	IND	Davinder Singh
33	GK	IND	Sanjiban Ghosh
34	DF	IND	Sarineo Fernandes
35	GK	IND	Prateek Kumar Singh
49	MF	IND	Girik Khosla
51	GK	IND	Imran Arshid
88	MF	TJK	Nuriddin Davronov
99	FW	IND	Jerry Pulamte
—	MF	IND	Abhijit Sarkar
—	MF	IND	Shahnawaz Bashir

== Contract Extension ==
=== New contracts ===
Date	Position	No.	Player	Ref.
21 September 2022	MF	17	(India) Samuel Kynshi	
28 September 2022	DF	27	(India) Paolenmang Tuboi	

== Transfers ==
=== Transfers in ===
Date from	Position	Nationality	Name	From	Fee	Ref.
12 September 2022	GK	(India)	Subhasish Roy Chowdhury	(India) NorthEast United	Free transfer	
13 September 2022	MF	(Tajikistan)	Nozim Babadzhanov	(Bahrain) Al-Ahli	Free transfer	
14 September 2022	MF	(India)	Mohammad Inam	(India) Delhi FC	Free transfer	
15 September 2022	MF	(India)	Loken Meitei	(India) Delhi FC	Free transfer	
16 September 2022	FW	(Ghana)	Issahak Seidu	(India) Golden Threads	Free transfer	
17 September 2022	DF	(India)	Kamalpreet Singh	(India) Odisha	Free transfer	
17 September 2022	DF	(India)	Shahid Nazir	(India) Hindustan FC	Free transfer	
18 September 2022	DF	(India)	Davinder Singh	(India) Chennaiyin	Free transfer	
18 September 2022	MF	(India)	Lalnuntluanga Bawitlung	(India) Swaraj FC	Free transfer	
19 September 2022	DF	(India)	Jestin George	(India) NorthEast United	Loan transfer	
20 September 2022	GK	(India)	Sanjiban Ghosh	(India) NorthEast United	Free transfer	
20 September 2022	FW	(India)	Parveez Hussain Parray	(India) Hindustan FC	Free transfer	
21 September 2022	DF	(India)	Akashdeep Singh	(India) Rajasthan United	Free transfer	
22 September 2022	FW	(India)	Jerry Pulamte	(India) Sagolband United	Free transfer	
22 September 2022	MF	(India)	Owais Bashir	(India) J & K FA	Free transfer	
23 September 2022	DF	(India)	Balwinder Singh	(India) Viva Chennai	Free transfer	
24 September 2022	MF	(India)	Abhijit Sarkar	(India) Sudeva Delhi	Free transfer	
25 September 2022	FW	(India)	Alocious Muthayyan	(India) Rajasthan United	Undisclosed Fee	
26 September 2022	MF	(India)	Girik Khosla	(India) Sreenidi Deccan	Free transfer	
27 September 2022	GK	(India)	Prateek Kumar Singh	(India) NEROCA	Free transfer	
27 September 2022	MF	(India)	Nestor Dias	(India) Goa	Free transfer	
2 October 2022	FW	(India)	Reuben Letkhontinchon	(India) Odisha B	Free transfer	
3 October 2022	MF	(Ghana)	Wadudu Yakubu	(Ghana) King Faisal Babes	Free transfer	
4 October 2022	FW	(Ghana)	Ibrahim Nurudeen	AS Togo-Port	Free transfer	
6 October 2022	DF	(India)	Abdul Hakku	(India) Kerala Blasters	Free transfer	
12 October 2022	DF	(Ghana)	Lamine Moro	(Iraq) Newroz	Free transfer	
3 November 2022	DF	(India)	Jayraj Ghelani	(India) Goalorious Mothers	Free transfer	
4 January 2023	FW	(India)	Phrangki Buam	(India) Goa	Free transfer	
5 January 2023	MF	(Tajikistan)	Nuriddin Davronov	(India) Mohammedan	Free transfer	
10 January 2023	MF	(India)	Rupert Nongrum	(India) NorthEast United	Free transfer	
16 January 2023	FW	(Ghana)	Ernest Boateng	(Slovenia) DAC Dunajská Streda	Free transfer	
18 January 2023	DF	(Ghana)	Richard Osei Agyemang	(Ghana) Ashanti Gold	Free transfer	
18 January 2023	DF	(India)	Joyner Lourenco	(India) East Bengal	Free transfer	

=== Promoted from Real Kashmmir FC Reserves ===
No.	Name	Nationality	Position(s)	Date of Birth (Age)	Ref.
51	Imran Arshid	(India)	GK	11 April 2006 (age 20)	

=== Transfers out ===
Date from	Position	Nationality	Name	To	Fee	Ref.
1 July 2022	DF	(India)	Prakash Sarkar	(India) Bhawanipore	Released	
1 July 2022	DF	(Scotland)	Mason Robertson		Released	
1 July 2022	DF	(India)	Bhupendar Singh	(India) Jamshedpur	Loan Return	
1 July 2022	GK	(India)	Niraj Kumar	(India) Jamshedpur	Loan Return	
1 July 2022	FW	(India)	Bawlte Rohmingthanga	(India) Rajasthan United	Released	
1 July 2022	FW	(Brazil)	Tiago Adan	(Malta) Marsaxlokk	Released	
1 July 2022	MF	(India)	Surchandra Singh	(India) Rajasthan United	Released	
1 July 2022	DF	(India)	Thoi Singh		Released	
1 July 2022	DF	(India)	Lalchhawnkima	(India) Aizawl	Released	
1 July 2022	DF	(India)	Abhash Thapa	(India) Mohammedan	Released	
1 July 2022	FW	(India)	Thomyo Shimray	(India) NEROCA	Released	
1 July 2022	MF	(India)	Saikat Sarkar	(India) Calcutta Customs	Released	
1 July 2022	DF	(India)	Sena Ralte	(India) FC Bethlehem	Released	
1 July 2022	DF	(India)	Mir Zahid	(India) STFC Natipora	Released	
1 July 2022	DF	(India)	Shahanwas Basheer		Released	
1 July 2022	DF	(Spain)	Fran Gonzalez	(Spain) Terrassa	Released	
1 July 2022	MF	(India)	Pratesh Shirodkar		Released	
1 July 2022	FW	(India)	Malemngamba Meitei	(India) Forward Club	Released	
1 July 2022	DF	(India)	Aaqib Amin		Released	
1 July 2022	DF	(India)	Koushik Sarkar	(India) Bhawanipore	Released	
1 July 2022	GK	(India)	Subham Roy	(India) Bhawanipore	Released	
1 July 2022	DF	(India)	Ponif Vaz	(India) Churchill Brothers	Released	
1 July 2022	DF	(India)	Rishik Shetty	(India) United	Released	
1 July 2022	DF	(India)	Abdul Jack Yule		Released	
1 July 2022	DF	(South Korea)	Park Jong-oh		Released	
1 July 2022	MF	(India)	Ragav Gupta	(India) Rajasthan United	Released	
1 November 2022	GK	(India)	Bilal Khan	(India) Gokulam Kerala	Released	
1 January 2023	DF	(India)	Abdul Hakku	(India) Gokulam Kerala	Released	
1 January 2023	FW	(Ghana)	Issahak Seidu		Released	
1 January 2023	DF	(Ghana)	Lamine Moro		Released	

== Competition ==
=== Overview ===
Win Draw Loss

Competition	First match	Last match	Starting round	Final position	Record							
Competition	First match	Last match	Starting round	Final position	Pld	W	D	L	GF	GA	GD	Win %
Super Cup	6 April 2023	6 April 2023	Qualifiers		1	0	0	1	0	6	−6	0.00
I-League	13 November 2022	11 March 2023	Matchday 1	5th	22	9	7	6	27	25	+2	40.91
Total					23	9	7	7	27	31	−4	39.13

Last updated: 11 March 2023
Source: Soccerway

=== I-League ===
==== League table ====
Pos	Team	Pld	W	D	L	GF	GA	GD	Pts
3	Gokulam Kerala	22	12	3	7	26	14	+12	39
4	TRAU	22	11	2	9	34	34	0	35
5	Real Kashmir	22	9	7	6	27	25	+2	34
6	Churchill Brothers	22	9	6	7	34	24	+10	33
7	Aizawl	22	6	8	8	27	29	−2	26 (Note: Head-to-head points: Aizawl 4, Mohammedan 1.)

Source: I-League
Rules for classification: 1) points; 2) head-to-head points; 3) head-to-head goal difference; 4) goal difference; 5) number of goals scored; 6) drawing of lots

==== League Results by Round ====
Match	1	2	3	4	5	6	7	8	9	10	11	12	13	14	15	16	17	18	19	20	21	22
Ground	A	H	H	H	H	H	H	A	A	A	A	A	A	A	H	H	H	H	A	H	A	A
Result	W	W	D	L	W	W	L	L	L	D	D	L	D	L	W	D	W	W	W	D	D	W
League Position	5	1	1	1	1	1	1	1	3	4	5	5	5	7	7	7	7	6	5	5	5	5

Updated to match(es) played on 11 March 2023. Source: I-League
A = Away; H = Home; W = Win; D = Draw; L = Loss

==== Matches ====
Note: I-League announced the fixtures for the 2022–23 season on 1 November 2022.

13 November 2022 1	NEROCA	0–1	Real Kashmir	Imphal, Manipur
16.30 IST	N. Akoijam (yellow card) 72'	Report	I. Seidu 53'; Chowdhury (yellow card) 90+1'; Davinder (yellow card) 90+6'	Stadium: Khuman Lampak Stadium; Attendance: 7,580; Referee: Mithun Kumar Kundu; Man of the Match: Ibrahim Nurudeen (Real Kashmir)

19 November 2022 2	Real Kashmir	2–0	Rajasthan United	Srinagar, Jammu and Kashmir
14.00 IST	Moro 20'; Davinder (yellow card) 34'; I. Seidu (yellow card) 51'; George (yellow card) 70'; Pulamte 77'	Report	Cháves (yellow card) 10'; M. Assisi (yellow card) 66'	Stadium: TRC Turf Ground; Attendance: 4,000; Referee: Jatinder Singh; Man of the Match: Lamine Moro (Real Kashmir)

22 November 2022 3	Real Kashmir	0–0	Gokulam Kerala	Srinagar, Jammu and Kashmir
14.00 IST	Moro (yellow card) 45+1'	Report	Bouba (yellow card) 44'	Stadium: TRC Turf Ground; Attendance: 3,500; Referee: Dipu Roy; Man of the Match: Shibinraj Kunniyil (Gokulam Kerala)

28 November 2022 4	Real Kashmir	0–3	Churchill Brothers	Srinagar, Jammu and Kashmir
14.00 IST	Davinder (yellow card) 30'; I. Nurudeen 75'; W. Yakubu (yellow card) 88'; Chowdhury (yellow card) 90+2'	Report	Gomes (yellow card) 43'; Vaz (yellow card) 45+2'; Clemente (yellow card) 62'	Stadium: TRC Turf Ground; Attendance: 4,123; Referee: V Eshwar Rao; Man of the Match: Samuel Kynshi (Real Kashmir)
Note: Initially, Real Kashmir won 1–0, but the scoreline was overturned by the AIFF after Churchill Brothers filed a protest due to an illegal substitution made by Real Kashmir.

1 December 2022 5	Real Kashmir	3–2	TRAU	Srinagar, Jammu and Kashmir
14.00 IST	George (yellow card) 29'; Babadzhanov 34'; W. Yakubu 58'; Moro 63'	Report	Tursunov 30'; N. Singh (yellow card) 38'; S. Johnson Singh 45+1'	Stadium: TRC Turf Ground; Attendance: 4,038; Referee: Lalit Singh Rawat; Man of the Match: Lamine Moro (Real Kashmir)

6 December 2022 6	Real Kashmir	2–1	Sreenidi Deccan	Srinagar, Jammu and Kashmir
14.00 IST	I. Nurudeen 61', 90+4' (yellow card) 90+4'	Report	Akhtar 12'; Ramhlunchhunga (yellow card) 59'; Bagui (yellow card) 60'; Awal (yellow card) 90+8'	Stadium: TRC Turf Ground; Attendance: 3,950; Referee: Lakshay; Man of the Match: Ibrahim Nurudeen (Real Kashmir)

12 December 2022 7	Real Kashmir	0–1	RoundGlass Punjab	Srinagar, Jammu and Kashmir
14.00 IST	Akashdeep (yellow card) 5' (yellow-red card) 49'; Moro (yellow card) 27' (yellow-red card) 76'; Bawitlung (yellow card) 60'	Report	Bhumij 21'; K. Lhungdim (yellow card) 65'	Stadium: TRC Turf Ground; Attendance: 3,446; Referee: Jatinder Singh; Man of the Match: Brandon Vanlalremdika (RoundGlass Punjab)

16 December 2022 8	Mohammedan	1–0	Real Kashmir	Kolkata, West Bengal
16.30 IST	Kima (yellow card) 13'; Dauda (yellow card) 49'; Joseph 57' (yellow card) 81'; Rahaman (red card) 84'; Ambekar (yellow card) 90+8'	Report	I. Nurudeen (yellow card) 60'; W. Yakubu (red card) 85'; Davinder (yellow card) 85'	Stadium: Kishore Bharati Krirangan; Attendance: 1,850; Referee: Srikant Bohidar; Man of the Match: Nikola Stojanović (Mohammedan)

22 December 2022 9	Mumbai Kenkre	2–1	Real Kashmir	Mumbai, Maharashtra
16.30 IST	A. Gaikwad 24'; K. Khongsit (yellow card) 42'; Nongkhlaw (yellow card) 66'; A. Khan 90' (pen.)	Report	George 17' (yellow card) 89'; Bawitlung (yellow card) 86'	Stadium: Cooperage Ground; Attendance: 840; Referee: Akashkumar Kamleshkumar Mehta; Man of the Match: Aman Gaikwad (Mumbai Kenkre)

9 January 2023 10	Aizawl	0–0	Real Kashmir	Aizawl, Mizoram
16.30 IST	Lalramsanga (yellow card) 45+1'	Report		Stadium: Rajiv Gandhi Stadium; Attendance: 2,000; Referee: Jehrul Islam; Man of the Match: Ibrahim Nurudeen (Real Kashmir)

12 January 2023 11	Sudeva Delhi	1–1	Real Kashmir	New Delhi, Delhi
14.00 IST	S. Lotjem 54'; Abioye (yellow card) 62'	Report	I. Nurudeen (yellow card) 34'; George (yellow card) 52'; Davinder (yellow card) 58'; W. Yakubu (yellow card) 62'; Bawitlung (yellow card) 63'; Kynshi 90+5'	Stadium: Chhatrasal Stadium; Attendance: 556; Referee: Kynsanphar Lyngdoh Nongum; Man of the Match: Samuel Kynshi (Real Kashmir)

20 January 2023 12	Gokulam Kerala	2–0	Real Kashmir	Calicut, Kerala
16.30 IST	Zaman 35'; R. Raju (yellow card) 36'; Sreekuttan (yellow card) 45+5'; Justin 86'	Report	Agyemang (yellow card) 45+5'	Stadium: EMS Stadium; Attendance: 2,864; Referee: Williams Joy Koshy; Man of the Match: Omar Ramos (Gokulam Kerala)

24 January 2023 13	Churchill Brothers	0–0	Real Kashmir	Vasco da Gama, Goa
16.30 IST		Report	W. Yakubu (yellow card) 20'; Bawitlung (yellow card) 78'; Chowdhury (yellow card) 89'	Stadium: Tilak Maidan; Attendance: 1,931; Referee: Mithun Kumar Kundu; Man of the Match: Lamgoulen Hangshing (Churchill Brothers)

27 January 2023 14	RoundGlass Punjab	2–0	Real Kashmir	Panchkula, Haryana
16.30 IST	Mera 41'; Vanlalremdika 63'; Krishananda (yellow card) 65'; Valpuia (yellow card) 79'	Report	Agyemang (yellow card) 40'; Akashdeep (yellow card) 55'; George (yellow card) 73'; Kamalpreet (yellow card) 74'; Davronov (yellow card) 80'	Stadium: Tau Devi Lal Stadium; Attendance: 300; Referee: K Ramdasan; Man of the Match: Brandon Vanlalremdika (RoundGlass Punjab)

~~1 February 2023~~ ~~15~~	Real Kashmir	Postponed	Aizawl	Srinagar, Jammu and Kashmir
16.30 IST				Stadium: TRC Turf Ground
Note: This match was postponed due to the heavy snowfall in Srinagar.

8 February 2023 15	Real Kashmir	4–2	Sudeva Delhi	Srinagar, Jammu and Kashmir
14.00 IST	Bawitlung 17' (yellow card) 45+1'; Agyemang 20', 71'; Khosla (yellow card) 22'; George 83'	Report	Gómez 22'; S. Khotam 55' (pen.)	Stadium: TRC Turf Ground; Attendance: 2,236; Referee: Mrutyunjay L Amatya; Man of the Match: Richard Osei Agyemang (Real Kashmir)

11 February 2023 16	Real Kashmir	2–2	NEROCA	Srinagar, Jammu and Kashmir
14.00 IST	Agyemang 10' (yellow card) 63'; Nongrum (yellow card) 45+1'; Bawitlung 90+3'	Report	Fletcher 13'; Agyemang 71' (o.g.)	Stadium: TRC Turf Ground; Attendance: 2,100; Referee: Surojit Das; Man of the Match: Sweden Fernandes (NEROCA)

18 February 2023 17	Real Kashmir	3–2	Mohammedan	Srinagar, Jammu and Kashmir
14.00 IST	Kynshi 27', 49'; I. Nurudeen (yellow card) 62'; Boateng 86'; Chowdhury (yellow card) 90'	Report	Murzaev 14'; C. Davis 33'; Joseph (yellow card) 75'	Stadium: TRC Turf Ground; Attendance: 2,513; Referee: Akashkumar Kamleshkumar Mehta; Man of the Match: Samuel Kynshi (Real Kashmir)

21 February 2023 18	Real Kashmir	2–1	Aizawl	Srinagar, Jammu and Kashmir
14.00 IST	George 79'; Kynshi 84' (yellow card) 84'	Report	Lalramsanga 75'	Stadium: TRC Turf Ground; Attendance: 538; Referee: V Eshwar Rao; Man of the Match: Samuel Kynshi (Real Kashmir)

26 February 2023 19	TRAU	0–2	Real Kashmir	Imphal, Manipur
14.00 IST		Report	Davronov (yellow card) 2'; Agyemang 30'; Buam 77'; George (yellow card) 85'	Stadium: Khuman Lampak Main Stadium; Attendance: 1,845; Referee: Williams Joy Koshy; Man of the Match: Richard Osei Agyemang (Real Kashmir)

2 March 2023 20	Real Kashmir	1–1	Mumbai Kenkre	Srinagar, Jammu and Kashmir
14.00 IST	Kynshi 68'; Agyemang (yellow card) 78'	Report	S. Negi (yellow card) 3'; A. Rajan (yellow card) 32'; Nongkhlaw 90+4'	Stadium: TRC Turf Ground; Attendance: 1,000; Referee: I Jamal Mohamed; Man of the Match: Subhasish Roy Chowdhury (Real Kashmir)

5 March 2023 21	Sreenidi Deccan	2–2	Real Kashmir	Hyderabad, Telangana
15.00 IST	Dinesh 86' (yellow card) 90+8'; R. Gabriel 90+1'	Report	Kynshi 19'; Davronov (yellow card) 69'; W. Yakubu (yellow card) 83'; Boateng 84'	Stadium: Deccan Arena; Attendance: 240; Referee: C R Srikrishna; Man of the Match: Samuel Kynshi (Real Kashmir)

11 March 2023 22	Rajasthan United	0–1	Real Kashmir	New Delhi, Delhi
16.30 IST	M. Assisi (yellow card) 45+1'; Mahata (yellow card) 85'	Report	Boateng 7' (yellow card) 71'; Bawitlung (yellow card) 72'; Lourenco (yellow card) 82'; Prateek (yellow card) 90+4'	Stadium: Ambedkar Stadium; Attendance: 536; Referee: K Ramdasan; Man of the Match: Ernest Boateng (Real Kashmir)

=== Super Cup ===
After finishing 5th in the I-League, Real Kashmir will have to play a qualifier against 6th-ranked Churchill Brothers to earn a place in the group stage.

==== Matches ====
Win Draw Loss

==== Qualifiers ====
6 April 2023 Q-4	Real Kashmir	0–6	Churchill Brothers	Manjeri, Kerala
20.30 IST		Report	Cháves 6' (pen.); Kromah 36' (pen.), 45+1', 59', 61'; Jakhonov 75'	Stadium: Payyanad Stadium; Attendance: 1,708; Referee: Pranjal Banerjee; Man of the Match: Ansumana Kromah (Churchill Brothers)

== Statistics ==
=== Goal Scorers ===
As of 26 February 2023

Rank	No.	Pos.	Nat.	Name	I League	IFA Shield	Super Cup	Total
1	11	MF	(India)	Samuel Kynshi	4	0	0	4
1	4	DF	(Ghana)	Richard Osei Agyemang	4	0	0	4
3	9	FW	(Ghana)	Ibrahim Nuruddin	3	0	0	3
3	24	DF	(India)	Jestin George	3	0	0	3
5	6	MF	(India)	Lalnuntluanga Bawitlung	2	0	0	2
5	25	DF	(Ghana)	Lamine Moro	2	0	0	2
7	8	MF	(Ghana)	Wadudu Yakubu	1	0	0	1
7	10	FW	(Tajikistan)	Nozim Babadzhanov	1	0	0	1
7	17	FW	(India)	Phrangki Buam	1	0	0	1
7	26	FW	(Ghana)	Ernest Boateng	1	0	0	1
7	37	FW	(Ghana)	Isahak Seidu	1	0	0	1
7	99	FW	(India)	Jerry Pulamte	1	0	0	1
Own Goals					0	0	0	0
Total					24	0	0	24
