= 2021–22 Real Kashmir FC season =

Indian professional football club

Real Kashmir FC
- Full name: Real Kashmir Football Club
- Nicknames: Sheeni Seh (Snow Leopards)
- Ground: TRC Turf Ground; Bakshi Stadium (proposed)
- Owner: Sandeep Chattoo
- Head coach: David Robertson
- League: I-League
- Website: www.realkashmirfc.com
Home colours	Away colours

The 2021-22 season is Real Kashmir's fourth season in the I-League.

== First Team squad ==
As of 26 December 2021

Note: Flags indicate national team as defined under FIFA eligibility rules; some limited exceptions apply. Players may hold more than one non-FIFA nationality.

No.	Pos.	Nation	Player
1	GK	IND	Bilal Khan
2	MF	IND	Prakash Sarkar
3	DF	SCO	Mason Robertson (captain)
7	MF	IND	Bhupendar Singh (on loan from Jamshedpur)
8	FW	IND	Bawlte Rohmingthanga
9	FW	BRA	Tiago Adan
10	MF	IND	Surchandra Singh
11	DF	IND	Thoi Singh
12	MF	IND	Farhan Ganie
13	DF	IND	Lalchhawnkima
16	DF	IND	Paolenmang Tuboi
18	DF	IND	Abhash Thapa
19	FW	IND	Thomyo Shimray
20	MF	IND	Saikat Sarkar
21	DF	IND	Sena Ralte

No.	Pos.	Nation	Player
22	GK	IND	Niraj Kumar (on loan from Jamshedpur)
24	MF	IND	Mir Zahid
26	MF	IND	Samuel Kynshi
30	DF	IND	Shahanwas Basheer
50	DF	ESP	Fran Gonzalez
55	MF	IND	Pratesh Shirodkar
—	FW	IND	Malemngamba Meitei
—	DF	IND	Aaqib Amin
—	DF	IND	Koushik Sarkar
—	GK	IND	Subham Roy
—	DF	IND	Ponif Vaz
—	DF	IND	Rishik Shetty
—	MF	IND	Ragav Gupta
—	DF	IND	Abdul Jack Yule
—	DF	KOR	Park Jong-oh

== Contract Extension ==
=== New contracts ===
Date	Position	No.	Player	Ref.
19 October 2021	MF	17	(India) Samuel Kynshi	
25 October 2021	DF	21	(India) Sena Ralte	
26 October 2021	DF		(India) Paolengmang Tuboi	
30 October 2021	DF		(India) Abhash Thapa	
5 November 2021	DF		(Scotland) Mason Robertson	

== Transfers ==
=== Transfers in ===
Date from	Position	Nationality	Name	From	Fee	Ref.
31 August 2021	MF	(India)	Bhupender Singh	(India) Jamshedpur	Loan	
31 August 2021	GK	(India)	Niraj Kumar	(India) Jamshedpur	Loan	
2 October 2021	DF	(India)	Thoi Singh	(India) Chennaiyin	None	
2 October 2021	MF	(India)	Surchandra Singh	(India) East Bengal	None	
19 October 2021	DF	(Spain)	Fran Gonzalez	(India) Bengaluru	None	
21 October 2021	MF	(India)	Mir Zahid	Academy	None	
22 October 2021	FW	(India)	Malemngamba Meitei	(India) FC Bengaluru United	None	
24 October 2021	DF	(India)	Aaqib Amin		None	
26 October 2021	FW	(Brazil)	Tiago Adan	(Brazil) Retrô	None	
27 October 2021	MF	(India)	Prakash Sarkar	(India) East Bengal	None	
28 October 2021	FW	(India)	Thomyo Shimray		None	
28 October 2021	DF	(India)	Lalchhawnkima		None	
29 October 2021	MF	(India)	Pratesh Shirodkar	(India) Dempo	None	
31 October 2021	MF	(India)	Saikat Sarkar	(India) Rainbow A.C	None	
1 November 2021	GK	(India)	Bilal Khan	(India) Kerala Blasters FC	None	
5 November 2021	CB	(India)	Koushik Sarkar	(India) Peerless FC	None	
1 November 2021	GK	(India)	Subham Roy	(India) Bhawanipore FC	None	
10 November 2021	CB	(India)	Ponif Vaz	(India) Northeast United FC	None	
10 November 2021	DF	(India)	Rishik Shetty		None	
11 November 2021	FW	(India)	Bawlte Rohmingthanga	(India) Aizawl F.C.	None	
15 November 2021	MF	(India)	Ragav Gupta	(India) Lonestar Kashmir	None	
25 December 2021	DF	(South Korea)	Park Jong-oh	(Thailand) Trat	None	
1 March 2022	FW	(Ivory Coast)	Bernard Yao Kouassi		None	

=== Transfers out ===
Date from	Position	Nationality	Name	To	Fee	Ref.
1 July 2021	DF	(Afghanistan)	Zohib Islam Amiri	(Canada) A.S. Blainville	Released	
11 July 2021	GK	(India)	Mithun Samanta	(India) Mohammedan	Released	
25 July 2021	MF	(India)	Danish Farooq Bhat	(India) Bengaluru	Released	
18 August 2021	DF	(India)	Bijay Chetri	(India) Sreenidhi FC	Released	
23 August 2021	DF	(India)	Pawan Kumar	(India) Gokulam Kerala	Released	
1 September 2021	FW	(Cameroon)	Aser Pierrick Dipanda	(India) Delhi	Released	
2 September 2021	DF	(India)	Dharmaraj Ravanan	(India) Bengaluru United	Released	
2 September 2021	DF	(India)	Arun Nagial	(India) Kerala United FC	Released	
26 October 2021	FW	(Nigeria)	Lukman Adefemi		Released	
26 October 2021	DF	(India)	Arjun Naghial		Released	
26 October 2021	GK	(India)	Anuj Kumar	(India) Hyderabad FC	Loan Return	
26 October 2021	MF	(India)	Shahnawaz Bashir	(India) Hyderiya Sports	Released	
26 October 2021	FW	(India)	Rohit Jhamat		Released	
26 October 2021	FW	(India)	Ifham Tariq Mir	(India) Hyderiya Sports	Released	

== Pre-season ==
22 November 2021 Friendly	Real Kashmir	3-1	BSS	Mohun Bagan Ground
16.00 IST

== Competitions ==
=== Overview ===
Competition	First match	Last match	Starting round	Final position	Record							
Competition	First match	Last match	Starting round	Final position	Pld	W	D	L	GF	GA	GD	Win %
I-League	26 December 2021		Matchday 1	0	1	1	0	0	3	2	+1	100.00
IFA Shield	24 November 2021	15 December 2021	CHAMPIONS		6	5	0	1	10	4	+6	83.33
Super Cup	TBD	TBD		-	0	0	0	0	0	0	+0	—
Total					7	6	0	1	13	6	+7	85.71

Last updated: 26 December 2021.
Source: Competitions

=== I-League ===
==== League table ====
Pos	Team	Pld	W	D	L	GF	GA	GD	Pts	Qualification
6	NEROCA	12	4	6	2	17	16	+1	18	Championship stage
7	Rajasthan United	12	3	7	2	10	8	+2	16	Championship stage
8	Real Kashmir	12	2	7	3	18	22	−4	13	Relegation stage
9	TRAU	12	3	3	6	12	15	−3	12	Relegation stage
10	Aizawl	12	4	0	8	15	19	−4	12	Relegation stage

Source: Hero I-League
Rules for classification: 1) points; 2) head-to-head points; 3) head-to-head goal difference; 4) goal difference; 5) number of goals scored; 6) drawing of lots

Pos	Team	Pld	W	D	L	GF	GA	GD	Pts	Qualification
1	Gokulam Kerala	18	13	4	1	44	15	+29	43	Champions and qualification for the play–offs for 2023–24 AFC Cup group stage spot
2	Mohammedan	18	11	4	3	34	18	+16	37	
3	Sreenidi Deccan	18	9	5	4	27	19	+8	32	
4	Churchill Brothers	18	9	3	6	24	22	+2	30	
5	RoundGlass Punjab	18	8	4	6	33	29	+4	28	
6	Rajasthan United	18	5	7	6	16	16	0	22	
7	NEROCA	18	4	8	6	21	30	−9	20	

Source: Hero I-League
Rules for classification: 1) points; 2) head-to-head points; 3) head-to-head goal difference; 4) goal difference; 5) number of goals scored; 6) drawing of lots

Pos	Team	Pld	W	D	L	GF	GA	GD	Pts
2	TRAU	17	4	6	7	15	17	−2	18
3	Indian Arrows	17	4	5	8	10	23	−13	17 (Note: Head-to-head standings: Indian Arrows 4 points, Sudeva Delhi 1 point.)
4	Sudeva Delhi	17	4	5	8	13	23	−10	17
5	Real Kashmir	17	2	8	7	23	31	−8	14
6	Kenkre	17	3	3	11	11	25	−14	12

Source: Hero I-League
Rules for classification: 1) points; 2) head-to-head points; 3) head-to-head goal difference; 4) goal difference; 5) number of goals scored; 6) drawing of lots
Notes:

Pos	Team	Pld	W	D	L	GF	GA	GD	Pts
9	TRAU	17	4	6	7	15	17	−2	18
10	Indian Arrows	17	4	5	8	10	23	−13	17
11	Sudeva Delhi	17	4	5	8	13	23	−10	17
12	Real Kashmir	17	2	8	7	23	31	−8	14
13	Kenkre	17	3	3	11	11	25	−14	12

Source: Hero I-League
Rules for classification: 1) points; 2) head-to-head points; 3) head-to-head goal difference; 4) goal difference; 5) number of goals scored; 6) drawing of lots

==== Matches ====
I-league fixtures were published on 7 December 2021.

26 December 2021 1	Real Kashmir	3-2	Aizawl	East Bengal Ground
14.00 IST				Attendance:

7 March 2022 3	Gokulam Kerala	5-1	Real Kashmir	Kalyani Municipal Stadium
16.30 IST	Luka Majcen 4' (pen.) 38'; Jourdaine Fletcher 5', 27'; Jithin M S 66'		Tiago Adan 48' (pen.)	Attendance:

== Group stage ==
=== Group A ===
Pos	Team	Pld	W	D	L	GF	GA	GD	Pts	
1	Real Kashmir	2	1	0	1	3	1	+2	3	Advance to the pre quarterfinals
2	Calcutta Customs	2	1	0	1	1	1	0	3	Advance to the pre quarterfinals
3	Indian Arrows	2	1	0	1	1	3	−2	3	

Source: kolkatafootball.com

24 November 2021 1	Real Kashmir	3-0	Indian Arrows	East Bengal Ground
14.00 IST	Fran Gonzalez 18'; Pratesh Shirodkar 23'; Thoi Singh 88'			Attendance:

28 November 2021 2	Real Kashmir	0-1	Calcutta Customs	East Bengal Ground
14.00 IST			Rabi Hansda 45+1'	Attendance:

=== Pre Quarter-finals ===
5 December 2021 PQF	Real Kashmir	2-1	Bhawanipore FC	East Bengal Ground
14.00 IST	Tiago Adan; Mason Robertson		Kamo Stephane Bayi	Attendance:

=== Quarterfinals ===
8 December 2021 QF	Mohammedan SC	0-1	Real Kashmir	East Bengal Ground
14.00 IST	Lalchhawnkima			Attendance:

=== Semi-final ===
12 December 2021 SF	Real Kashmir	2-1	Gokulam Kerala FC	East Bengal Ground
14.00 IST	Mason Robertson 23'; Thoi Singh 30'		Ronald Singh 45+2'	Attendance:

=== Final ===
15 December 2021 F	Real Kashmir	2-1	Sreenidi Deccan FC	East Bengal Ground
14.00 IST	Fran González 90+3'; Mason Robertson 100'		David C.Monoz 30'	Attendance:

=== Goal Scorers ===
Rank	No.	Pos.	Nat.	Name	I League	IFA Shield	Super Cup	Total
1	3	DF	(Scotland)	Mason Robertson	1	3	0	4
2	9	FW	(Brazil)	Tiago Adan	2	1	0	3
3	11	FW	(India)	Thoi Singh	0	2	0	2
3	50	DF	(Spain)	Fran Gonzalez	0	2	0	2
4	55	FW	(India)	Pratesh Shirodkar	0	1	0	1
4		FW	(India)	Lalchhawnkima	0	1	0	1
Own Goals					0	0	0	0
Total					3	10	0	13
