= 2017–18 FC Goa season =

2017–18 season of FC Goa

Goa
2017–18 season
- President: Akshay Tandon
- Head Coach: Sergio Lobera
- Stadium: Fatorda Stadium
- ISL: Regular season: 3rd Playoffs: Semi-finals
- Super Cup: Semi-finals
- Top goalscorer: League: Coro (18); All: Coro (20)
- Highest home attendance: 18,600 vs Bengaluru (30 November 2017); 18,600 vs Pune City (23 December 2017)
- Lowest home attendance: 2567 vs Delhi Dynamos (21 February 2018)
- Average home league attendance: 17,535
Home colours	Away colours

The 2017–18 season was the club's fourth season since its establishment in 2014 and their fourth season in the Indian Super League.

== Season overview ==
=== Pre-season ===
FC Goa announced on 24 April signing of nine players for their development squad but only six names were revealed. Aaren D'Silva and Derren Fernandes were signed from Santa Cruz Club of Cavelossim, Princeton Rebello from Vasco. Liston Colaco signed from Salgaocar F.C. for the transfer fee of ₹1.5 Million. Ivon Costa and Jude Cardozo from local Goan clubs.

=== June ===
On 5 June 2017, FC Goa announced Sergio Lobera as their new manager replacing Zico on a 2-year contract. On 16 June 2017, FC Goa announced the return of Bruno Pinheiro.

=== July ===
FC Goa retained goalkeeper Laxmikant Kattimani and midfielder Mandar Rao Desai from their last season's squad before the players draft. Both players signed three-year deal and will stay with the franchise until 2020. On 12 July, Manuel Arana signed for FC Goa on 1-year contract. On 18 July, FC Goa announced signing of Spanish forward Ferran Corominas on 1-year deal who last played for Cypriot side Doxa Katokopias.

In ISL players draft held on 23 July 2017, FC Goa retained midfielder Pratesh Shirodkar. Franchise added ten new players from draft, goalkeeper Bruno Colaco and Naveen Kumar, defender Chinglensana Singh, Amey Ranawade and Mohamed Ali, midfielder Brandon Fernandes, Anthony D'Souza, Seriton Fernandes, Jovel Martins and Mohammed Yasir. Defender Narayan Das and midfielder Pronay Halder made their comebacks. Five players from FC Goa were signed by other clubs in the draft. Defender Keenan Almeida and Fulganco Cardozo were signed by Chennaiyin. Midfielder Sahil Tavora was signed by Mumbai City. Midfielder Romeo Fernandes was signed by Delhi Dynamos and forward Robin Singh was signed by ATK. I-League side Mohun Bagan signed defender Debabrata Roy outside draft.

FC Goa announced signing of Indian striker Manvir Singh on 28 July 2017.

=== August ===
On 2 August, Moroccan midfielder Ahmed Jahouh was signed from FUS Rabat on a year long loan deal. On 14 August 2017, former FC Barcelona B player Sergio Juste signed for FC Goa. On 23 August 2017, Manuel Lanzarote signed for FC Goa from Real Zaragoza.

=== September ===
On 1 September 2017, FC Goa completed the signings of two foreign players Edu Bedia and Adrian Colunga. It was announced that Goa would have their pre-season in Murcia, Spain with a 27-man squad and play five friendly matches in Spain.

=== October ===
FC Goa had a strong pre-season after they played a total of five friendlies in Spain; winning three and losing two matches. They returned to Goa on 27 October 2017.

=== November ===
FC Goa continued their preparations for the new season by playing three friendlies in Goa, they won two and lost one out of three matches. They ended their pre-season with a 4–0 victory over Chennai City.

FC Goa kicked off their Indian Super League season by beating Chennaiyin away 2–3. On 25 November 2017, Goa lost their first match of the season against Mumbai City 1–2. On 30 November 2017, Goa won their first home match 4–3 against Bengaluru as Ferran Corominas scored the first hat-trick of the 2017–18 Indian Super League.

=== December ===
FC Goa continued their good form after winning 5–2 against Kerala Blasters as Corominas scored his second consecutive hat-trick of the season. On 17 December, Goa beat Delhi Dynamos in a 1–5 away victory, sending them at the top of the table. FC Goa lost their first home match of the season against Pune City in a 0–2 loss.

=== January ===
On 3 January 2018, FC Goa drew their first game of the calendar year with a 1–1 away draw against ATK, the match was delayed by 2 hours and 45 minutes due to unavoidable circumstances at Goa Airport which caused the team travel late. Three days later, Goa lost their third match in the league against NorthEast United in a 2–1 away loss, this loss left them winless in three games. On 10 January, Goa announced the signing of winger Lalmuankima from Aiwzal FC, they also signed U-19 goalkeeper Mohammad Nawaz who would join their development team. On 11 January, Goa defeated Jamshedpur in a 2–1 home victory as Lanzarote scored a brace, this was their first win of the calendar year 2018. On 21 January, Goa beat Kerala Blasters in a 1–2 away victory with goals from Ferran Corominas and Edu Bedia. On 24 January, Mohamed Ali and Brandon Fernandes signed new contracts with FC Goa which would keep them at the club until 2020. On 26 January, Goa announced the signing of Mark Sifneos until the end of the season. On 28 February, Goa lost to Mumbai City 3–4 at home with Seriton Fernandes receiving two yellow cards and sent off. On 31 January, Goa announced that Manuel Arana would be sent on loan to Delhi Dynamos until the end of the season.

=== February ===
On 2 February, Goa announced the signing of Hugo Boumous following the departure Manuel Arana. Two days later, Goa drew 2–2 at home against NorthEast United. On 9 February, Goa suffered a 2–0 away defeat to Bengaluru. On 15 February, Goa lost 0–1 to Chennaiyin at home. On 21 February, Goa drew 1–1 with Delhi Dynamos at home which meant they were winless in five games. Goa then bounced back and went on to win 0–4 away vs Pune City and 5–1 at home vs ATK.

=== March ===
On 4 March, Goa won 0–3 away against Jamshedpur. They qualified for the playoffs and finished third in the group. After picking up a 1–1 draw in the first leg of the semi-final against Chennaiyin, they lost 0–3 in the second leg away from home and got knocked out. They directly qualified for the 2018 Super Cup after finishing in the top six of the Indian Super League table. On 24 March, FC Goa announced on Twitter that assistant coach Derrick Pereira would take charge as head coach for the Super Cup in Sergio Lobera's absence.

=== April ===
On 3 April, Goa beat ATK 3–1 in the round of 16 of the Super Cup. On 12 April, Goa beat Jamshedpur 1–5 in the quarter-finals of the Super Cup, Goa players; Sergio Juste, Brandon Fernandes and Bruno Pinheiro and Jamshedpur players; Subrata Pal, Anas Edathodika and Kervens Belfort were sent off at the start of the second half. On 16 April, Goa were knocked out after East Bengal beat Goa 1–0 in the semi-finals of the Super Cup.

== Pre Season Friendlies ==
Win Draw Loss

12 October 2017 Friendly	FC Cartagena (Spain)	4–1	(India) FC Goa	Murcia, Spain
18:00 CET	Kuki Zalazar 1', 37'; Martín 13'; Gonzalo Poley 40'	Report	Colunga 18'	Stadium: La Manga Club

16 October 2017 Friendly	FC Goa (India)	1–2	(Spain) Real Murcia Imperial	Murcia, Spain
17:00 CET	Lanzarote	Report	Mengoud; Jordan Domínguez	Stadium: La Manga Club

19 October 2017 Friendly	FC Goa (India)	3–0	(Spain) Deportiva Minera	Murcia, Spain
18:00 CET	Corominas; Arana; Colunga	Report		Stadium: La Manga Club

23 October 2017 Friendly	FC Goa (India)	3–1	(Spain) Algar	Murcia, Spain
18:00 CET	Corominas 58'; Lanzarote 63', 82'	Report	Víctor	Stadium: La Manga Club

26 October 2017 Friendly	FC Goa (India)	4–2	(Spain) FC Cartagena B	Murcia, Spain
15:30 CET	Brandon 12' Corominas 40'; Lanzarote 43' Colunga 93'	Report		Stadium: La Manga Club

3 November 2017 Friendly	FC Goa (India)	1–2	(India) East Bengal	Bambolim, India
18:00 IST	Manvir 80'	Report	Vanlalremdika 8'; D'Souza 82'	Stadium: Athletic Stadium

9 November 2017 Friendly	FC Goa (India)	2–0	(India) Mohun Bagan	Margao, India
19:00 IST	Lanzarote 1'; Corominas 21'			Stadium: Fatorda Stadium

12 November 2017 Friendly	FC Goa (India)	4–0	(India) Chennai City	Bambolim, India
19:00 IST	Mandar Rao Dessai 26' 50'; Brandon 53'; Anthony D'Souza 68'	Report		Stadium: Athletic Stadium

== Transfers ==
=== In ===
Pos.	Player	Previous club	Date	Ref
MF	(India) Princeton Rebello	(India) Vasco	24 April 2017	
MF	(Portugal) Bruno Pinheiro	(Israel) Hapoel Haifa	16 June 2017	
MF	(Spain) Manuel Arana	(Australia) Brisbane Roar	12 July 2017	
FW	(Spain) Coro	(Cyprus) Doxa	17 July 2017	
DF	(India) Narayan Das	(India) Pune City	23 July 2017	
MF	(India) Pronay Halder	(India) Mohun Bagan	23 July 2017	
DF	(India) Chinglensana Singh	(India) Shillong Lajong	23 July 2017	
MF	(India) Brandon Fernandes	(India) Churchill Brothers	23 July 2017	
MF	(India) Seriton Fernandes	(India) Churchill Brothers	23 July 2017	
GK	(India) Naveen Kumar	(India) Churchill Brothers	23 July 2017	
DF	(India) Mohamed Ali	(India) NEROCA FC	23 July 2017	
MF	(India) Jovel Martins	(India) Sporting Goa	23 July 2017	
DF	(India) Amey Ranawade	(India) DSK Shivajians	23 July 2017	
MF	(India) Anthony D'Souza	(India) Churchill Brothers	23 July 2017	
DF	(India) Mohammad Yasir		23 July 2017	
GK	(India) Bruno Colaço	(India) Dempo	23 July 2017	
FW	(India) Manvir Singh	(India) Mohammedan	28 July 2017	
DF	(Spain) Sergio Juste	(Spain) Hospitalet	14 August 2017	
MF	(Spain) Manuel Lanzarote	(Spain) Real Zaragoza	23 August 2017	
MF	(Spain) Edu Bedia	(Spain) Real Zaragoza	31 August 2017	
FW	(Spain) Adrián Colunga	(Cyprus) Anorthosis	31 August 2017	
FW	(India) Lalmuankima	(India) Aizawl F.C.	10 January 2018	
GK	(India) Mohammad Nawaz	(India) Indian Arrows	10 January 2018	
FW	(Netherlands) Mark Sifneos	(India) Kerala Blasters	26 January 2018	
MF	(Morocco) Hugo Boumous	(Morocco) Moghreb Tétouan	2 February 2018	

=== Out ===
Pos.	Player	New Club	Date	Ref
GK	(India) Subhasish Roy Chowdhury	(India) East Bengal	1 January 2017	
GK	(India) Sukhdev Patil	(India) Mumbai	1 January 2017	
DF	(Brazil) Lúcio	Released	1 January 2017	
DF	(France) Grégory Arnolin	Released	1 January 2017	
DF	(India) Denzil Franco	(India) Churchill Brothers	1 January 2017	
DF	(Brazil) Luciano Sabrosa	Released	1 January 2017	
MF	(Spain) Jofre Mateu	Released	1 January 2017	
FW	(Brazil) Reinaldo	(Brazil) Brasiliense	1 January 2017	
FW	(Brazil) Júlio César	(Brazil) Madureira	1 January 2017	
FW	(Brazil) Rafael Coelho	(Thailand) Chiangrai United	6 January 2017	
MF	(Brazil) Richarlyson	(Brazil) Guarani	8 May 2017	
DF	(India) Keenan Almeida	(India) Chennaiyin	23 July 2017	
DF	(India) Fulganco Cardozo	(India) Chennaiyin	23 July 2017	
MF	(India) Sahil Tavora	(India) Mumbai City	23 July 2017	
MF	(India) Romeo Fernandes	(India) Delhi Dynamos	23 July 2017	
MF	(India) Robin Singh	(India) ATK	23 July 2017	
DF	(India) Debabrata Roy	(India) Mohun Bagan	23 July 2017	
FW	(Spain) Adrián Colunga	Released	26 January 2018	

=== Loan in ===
Pos.	Name	From	Date from	Date to	Ref
MF	(Morocco) Ahmed Jahouh	(Morocco) FUS Rabat	2 August 2017	30 July 2017	

=== Loan out ===
Pos.	Name	To	Date from	Date to	Ref
MF	(Spain) Manuel Arana	(India) Delhi Dynamos	31 January 2018	17 March 2018	

== Squad ==
Note: Flags indicate national team as defined under FIFA eligibility rules; some limited exceptions apply. Players may hold more than one non-FIFA nationality.

No.	Pos.	Nation	Player
1	GK	IND	Bruno Colaço
2	DF	IND	Amey Ranawade
3	DF	IND	Narayan Das
5	MF	MAR	Ahmed Jahouh (on loan form (Morocco) FUS Rabat)
6	DF	IND	Chinglensana Singh
96	FW	NED	Mark Sifneos
8	FW	ESP	Coro
9	FW	IND	Manvir Singh
10	MF	IND	Brandon Fernandes
4	MF	MAR	Hugo Boumous
12	MF	ESP	Manuel Lanzarote
13	MF	IND	Anthony D'Souza
15	MF	IND	Mohammad Yasir

No.	Pos.	Nation	Player
16	DF	POR	Bruno Pinheiro
17	MF	IND	Mandar Rao Dessai
18	MF	IND	Pronay Halder
19	FW	IND	Liston Colaco
20	DF	IND	Seriton Fernandes
21	DF	ESP	Chechi
23	MF	ESP	Edu Bedia
—	FW	IND	Lalmuankima
27	GK	IND	Laxmikant Kattimani (captain)
28	MF	IND	Pratesh Shirodkar
32	GK	IND	Naveen Kumar
33	DF	IND	Jovel Martins
37	DF	IND	Mohamed Ali

=== Current Technical Staff ===
Position	Name
Head coach	(Spain) Sergio Lobera
Assistant coach	(India) Derrick Pereira
Conditioning coach	(Spain) Manuel Sayabera

== Competitions ==
=== Indian Super League ===
==== Standings ====
Pos	Team	Pld	W	D	L	GF	GA	GD	Pts	Qualification or relegation
1	Bengaluru	18	13	1	4	35	16	+19	40	Qualification for ISL play-offs
2	Chennaiyin (Note: Qualified for 2019 AFC Cup qualifying play-offs) (C)	18	9	5	4	24	19	+5	32	Qualification for ISL play-offs
3	Goa	18	9	3	6	42	28	+14	30	Qualification for ISL play-offs
4	Pune City	18	9	3	6	30	21	+9	30	Qualification for ISL play-offs
5	Jamshedpur	18	7	5	6	16	18	−2	26	

Source: Indian Super League
Rules for classification: 1) points; 2) head-to-head points; 3) head-to-head goal difference; 4) head-to-head goals scored; 5) goal difference; 5) number of goals scored; 6) fair play ranking; 6) drawing of lots
(C) Champions

==== Results summary ====
Overall								Home						Away					
Pld	W	D	L	GF	GA	GD	Pts	W	D	L	GF	GA	GD	W	D	L	GF	GA	GD
18	9	3	6	42	29	+13	30	4	2	3	22	18	+4	5	1	3	20	11	+9

Last updated: 15 March 2018.
Source: http://www.indiansuperleague.com/isl-2017/schedule-fixtures

==== Results by round ====
Round	1	2	3	4	5	6	7	8	9	10	11	12	13	14	15	16	17	18
Ground	A	A	H	H	A	H	A	A	H	A	H	H	A	H	H	A	H	A
Result	W	L	W	W	W	L	D	L	W	W	L	D	L	L	D	W	W	W
Position	3	4	4	2	1	2	4	5	4	4	4	5	6	6	7	6	4	3

Updated to match(es) played on 15 March 2018. Source: Matches
A = Away; H = Home; W = Win; D = Draw; L = Loss

=== Matches ===
19 November 2017 1	Chennaiyin	2–3	Goa	Chennai, India
17:30 IST (UTC+5:30)	Calderón 70'; Augusto 84' (pen.)	Report	Corominas 25'; Lanzarote 29'; Dessai 39'	Stadium: Jawaharlal Nehru Stadium; Attendance: 18,213

25 November 2017 2	Mumbai	2–1	Goa	Mumbai, India
20:00 IST (UTC+5:30)	Éverton Santos 59'; Thiago Santos 88'	Report	Manuel Arana 83'	Stadium: Mumbai Football Arena; Attendance: 6,212

30 November 2017 3	Goa	4–3	Bengaluru	Margao, India
20:00 IST (UTC+5:30)	Coro 16' 33' 63'; Lanzarote 40' (pen.)	Report	Miku 20' 60'; Paartalu 57'; Sandhu (red card) 36'	Stadium: Fatorda Stadium; Attendance: 18,600

9 December 2017 4	Goa	5–2	Kerala	Margao, India
20:00 IST (UTC+5:30)	Lanzarote 9' 18'; Corominas 47' 51' 55'	Report	Sifneos 7'; Singh 30'	Stadium: Fatorda Stadium; Attendance: 18,482

16 December 2017 5	Delhi	1–5	Goa	Delhi, India
20:00 IST (UTC+5:30)	Corominas 45+1'; Lanzarote 45+3'; Kotal 85' (og.); Colunga 85'; Arana 88'	Report	Uche 62'; Cichero (red card) 65'	Stadium: Jawaharlal Nehru Stadium; Attendance: 11,119

23 December 2017 6	Goa	0–2	Pune	Margao, India
17:30 IST (UTC+5:30)		Report	Alfaro 72'; Lucca 84'	Stadium: Fatorda Stadium; Attendance: 18,600

3 January 2018 7	ATK	1–1	Goa	Kolkata, India
22:40 IST (UTC+5:30)	Keane 4'	Report	Corominas 24'	Stadium: Salt Lake Stadium; Attendance: 19,626

6 January 2018 8	NorthEast United	2–1	Goa	Guwahati, India
20:00 IST (UTC+5:30)	Marchino 21'; Doungel 52'	Report	Arana 28'	Stadium: Indira Gandhi Athletic Stadium; Attendance: 5,103

11 January 2018 9	Goa	2–1	Jamshedpur	Margao, India
20:00 IST (UTC+5:30)	Lanzarote 19' (pen.) 60'	Report	Trindade 54'	Stadium: Fatorda Stadium; Attendance: 17,128

21 January 2018 10	Kerala Blasters	1–2	Goa	Kochi, India
20:00 IST (UTC+5:30)	Vineeth 29'	Report	Corominas 7'; Bedia 77'	Stadium: Jawaharlal Nehru Stadium (Kochi); Attendance: 29,769

28 January 2018 11	Goa	3–4	Mumbai City	Margao, India
17:30 IST (UTC+5:30)	Corominas 34' 78'; Lanzarote 45'	Report	Santos 36'; Emana 55' (pen.); Thiago Santos 71'; Singh 86'	Stadium: Fatorda Stadium; Attendance: 17,812

4 February 2018 12	Goa	2–2	NorthEast United	Margao, India
20:00 IST (UTC+5:30)	Dessai 42'; Corominas 53'	Report	Marcinho 45'; Mosquera 71'	Stadium: Fatorda Stadium; Attendance: 16,612

9 February 2018 13	Bengaluru	2–0	Goa	Bengaluru, India
20:00 IST (UTC+5:30)	García 35'; Delgado 82'	Report		Stadium: Sree Kanteerava Stadium; Attendance: 14,724

15 February 2018 14	Goa	0–1	Chennaiyin	Margao, India
20:00 IST (UTC+5:30)		Report	Iñigo Calderón 52'	Stadium: Fatorda Stadium; Attendance: 16,842

15 February 2018 15	Goa	1–1	Delhi Dynamos	Margao, India
20:00 IST (UTC+5:30)	Hugo Boumous 53'	Report	Kalu Uche 81'	Stadium: Fatorda Stadium; Attendance: 16,221

25 February 2018 16	Pune City	0–4	Goa	Pune, India
17:30 IST (UTC+5:30)	Marcelo Leite Pereira (yellow card) 80' (red card)	Report	Manuel Lanzarote 28' (pen.); Hugo Boumous 47'; Ferran Corominas 58' 65' (pen.)	Stadium: Balewadi Stadium; Attendance: 7,861

28 February 2018 17	Goa	5–1	ATK	Margao, India
20:00 IST (UTC+5:30)	Sergio Juste 10'; Manuel Lanzarote 15', 21'; Ferran Corominas 64'; Mark Sifneos 90'	Report	Robbie Keane 87'	Stadium: Fatorda Stadium; Attendance: 17224

4 March 2018 18	Jamshedpur	0–3	Goa	Jamshedpur, India
20:00 IST (UTC+5:30)	Subrata Pal (red card)	Report	Ferran Corominas 29', 51'; Manuel Lanzarote 69'; Naveen Kumar (footballer) (red card)	Stadium: JRD Tata Sports Complex; Attendance: 23,386

==== Playoffs ====
===== Semi-finals =====
10 March 2018 First Leg	Goa	1–1	Chennaiyin	Margao, India
20:00 IST (UTC+5:30)	Manuel Lanzarote 64'	Report	Anirudh Thapa 71'	Stadium: Fatorda Stadium; Attendance: 18,492

13 March 2018 Second Leg	Chennaiyin	3–0	Goa	Chennai, India
20:00 IST (UTC+5:30)	Jeje Lalpekhlua 26' 90'; Dhanpal Ganesh 29'	Report		Stadium: Marina Arena; Attendance: 19,013

=== Super Cup ===
==== Round of 16 ====
3 April 2018 Round of 16	Goa	3–1	ATK	Bhubaneswar
20:00 IST	Coro 45+1'; Boumous 70'; Fernandes 77'	Report	Keane 50'	Stadium: Kalinga Stadium; Attendance: 2,583; Referee: Rowan Arumughan

==== Quarter-finals ====
12 April 2018 Quarter-final	Jamshedpur	1–5	Goa	Bhubaneswar
16:00 IST	Pal (red card) 46'; Edathodika (red card) 46'; Belfort (red card) 46'; Biswas 90+1'	Report	Fernandes 34' (red card) 46'; Coro 69' (pen.); Singh 77'; Boumous 79' 89'; Juste (red card) 46'; Pinheiro (red card) 46'	Stadium: Kalinga Stadium; Attendance: 1,200; Referee: Venkatesh R

==== Semi-finals ====
16 April 2018 Semi-final	East Bengal	1–0	Goa	Bhubaneswar
16:00 IST	Dudu 78'		Bedia (red card) 80'	Stadium: Kalinga Stadium; Referee: Santosh Kumar

== Player statistics ==
As of 23 December 2017

List of squad players, including number of appearances by competition

No.	Pos	Nat	Player	Total		Indian Super League	
No.	Pos	Nat	Player	Apps	Goals	Apps	Goals
Goalkeepers
25	GK	(India) IND	Laxmikant Kattimani	6	0	6	0
32	GK	(India) IND	Naveen Kumar	0	0	0	0
1	GK	(India) IND	Bruno Colaco	0	0	0	0
Defenders
16	DF	(Portugal) POR	Bruno Pinheiro	5	0	5	0
21	DF	(Catalonia) CAT	Sergio Juste	0	0	0	0
3	DF	(India) IND	Narayan Das	6	0	6	0
6	DF	(India) IND	Chinglensana Singh	1	0	1	0
33	DF	(India) IND	Jovel Martins	0	0	0	0
20	DF	(India) IND	Seriton Fernandes	6	0	6	0
2	DF	(India) IND	Amey Ranawade	0	0	0	0
37	DF	(India) IND	Mohamed Ali	6	0	6	0
Midfielders
15	MF	(India) IND	Mohammed Yasir	0	0	0	0
5	MF	(Morocco) MAR	Ahmed Jahouh	6	0	6	0
4	MF	(Morocco) MAR	Hugo Boumous	0	0	0	0
12	MF	(Spain) ESP	Manuel Lanzarote	6	5	6	5
23	MF	(Spain) ESP	Edu Bedia	6	0	6	0
18	MF	(India) IND	Pronay Halder	4	0	4	0
28	MF	(India) IND	Pratesh Shirodkar	0	0	0	0
13	MF	(India) IND	Anthony D'Souza	0	0	0	0
17	MF	(India) IND	Mandar Rao Desai	6	1	6	1
10	MF	(India) IND	Brandon Fernandes	5	0	5	0
Forwards
8	FW	(Catalonia) CAT	Corominas	6	8	6	8
9	FW	(India) IND	Manvir Singh	3	0	3	0
	FW	(India) IND	H. Lalmuankima	0	0	0	0
19	FW	(India) IND	Liston Colaco	2	0	2	0
47	FW	(India) IND	Omkar Landge	0	0	0	0
29	FW	(Netherlands) NED	Mark Sifneos	0	0	0	0
Players who have made an appearance or had a squad number this season but have left the club
7	FW	(Spain) ESP	Adrián Colunga	2	1	2	1
11	MF	(Spain) ESP	Manuel Arana	6	2	6	2

=== Goalscorers ===
No.	Pos.	Nation	Name	Indian Super League	Super Cup
8	FW	(Spain)	Corominas	18	2
12	MF	(Spain)	Lanzarote	13	0
11	MF	(Spain)	Manuel Arana	3	0
4	MF	(Morocco)	Hugo Boumous	2	3
17	MF	(India)	Mandar Rao Dessai	2	0
7	FW	(Spain)	Adrián Colunga	1	0
10	MF	(India)	Brandon Fernandes	0	2
24	DF	(Spain)	Sergio Juste	1	0
23	FW	(Spain)	Edu Bedia	1	0
96	FW	(Netherlands)	Mark Sifneos	1	0
9	FW	(India)	Manvir Singh	0	1
Own goals				1	0
TOTAL				42	8

Last updated: 16 April 2018

=== Hat-tricks ===
Player	Against	Result	Date	Competition
(Spain) Ferran Corominas	Bengaluru	4–3 (H)	30 November 2017	Indian Super League
(Spain) Ferran Corominas	Kerala Blasters	5–2 (H)	9 December 2017	Indian Super League

=== Clean sheets ===
Rank	Name	Indian Super League	Super Cup	Games played
1	(India) Naveen Kumar	2	0	8
2	(India) Laxmikant Kattimani	0	0	15

=== Disciplinary record ===
No.	Pos	Nat	Player	ISL			Super Cup			Notes
No.	Pos	Nat	Player	Booked	(yellow card) (yellow-red card)	Sent off (straight red)	Booked	(yellow card) (yellow-red card)	Sent off (straight red)	Notes
5	MF	(Morocco)	Ahmed Jahouh	5	0	0	0	0	0	
20	DF	(India)	Seriton Fernandes	1	1	0	1	0	0	
32	GK	(India)	Naveen Kumar	0	0	1	0	0	0	
11	MF	(Spain)	Manuel Arana	2	0	0	0	0	0	
12	MF	(Spain)	Manuel Lanzarote	5	0	0	0	0	0	
10	MF	(India)	Brandon Fernandes	2	0	0	0	0	1	
3	DF	(India)	Narayan Das	3	0	0	0	0	0	
6	DF	(India)	Chinglesana Singh	2	0	0	0	0	0	
8	FW	(Spain)	Ferran Corominas	3	0	0	0	0	0	
37	DF	(India)	Mohamed Ali	2	0	0	0	0	0	
23	MF	(Spain)	Edu Bedia	5	0	0	0	1	0	
17	MF	(India)	Mandar Rao Dessai	1	0	0	0	0	0	
15	MF	(India)	Pratesh Shirodkar	1	0	0	0	0	0	
9	FW	(India)	Manvir Singh	1	0	0	0	0	0	
18	MF	(India)	Pronay Halder	1	0	0	2	0	0	
4	MF	(Morocco)	Hugo Boumous	1	0	0	2	0	0	
96	FW	(Netherlands)	Mark Sifneos	1	0	0	0	0	0	
16	DF	(Portugal)	Bruno Pinheiro	0	0	0	0	0	1	
21	DF	(Spain)	Sergio Juste	0	0	0	0	0	1	
Total				36	1	1	5	1	3	

Updated: 16 April 2018
