= 2016 FC Goa season =

2016 season of FC Goa

Goa
2016 season
- Owner: Jaydev Mody
- Head Coach: Zico
- Stadium: Fatorda Stadium
- ISL: 8th
- ISL finals: DNQ
- Top goalscorer: Rafael Coelho (5 goals)
- Highest home attendance: 19,003 vs Pune City FC (8 October 2016)
- Lowest home attendance: 14,717 vs Chennaiyin FC (1 December 2016)

The 2016 FC Goa season was the club's third season since its establishment in 2014 and their third season in the Indian Super League.

== Background ==
After retaining Brazilian head coach, Zico, as well as the core Indian players from the 2014 season such as Romeo Fernandes, Mandar Rao Desai, Narayan Das, and Laxmikant Kattimani, Goa began the season in good fashion with a 2–0 victory at home against Delhi Dynamos. Goa went on the finish the regular season in first place, winning seven of their fourteen games, losing only once in the second half of the season. In the finals, Goa took on Delhi Dynamos in the semi-finals. After losing the away leg 1–0, Goa qualified for the final after winning the home leg 3–0. Goals from Jofre, Rafael Coelho, and Dudu Omagbemi, saw Goa win on aggregate 3–1.

Goa took on Chennaiyin in the final at the Fatorda Stadium. Bruno Pelissari gave Chennaiyin the lead in the 54th minute after missing his penalty before Goa took a 2–1 going into stoppage time through Thongkhosiem Haokip and Jofre. However, an own goal from Kattimani and a strike from Stiven Mendoza saw Chennaiyin win the match 3–2 and win the championship.

== Season overview ==
FC Goa played their first match on 4 October 2016 against NorthEast United FC and succumbed a 2–0 away defeat in Guwahati. Four days later, Goa lost their first home match of the season against FC Pune City after Momar Ndoye scored at the 90th-minute winner to give them a 1–2 victory.

== Pre Season Friendly ==
11 September 2016 Exhibition match	FC Goa (India)	1–3	(Brazil) Bangu Atlético Clube	Rio de Janeiro, Brazil
	1		3

15 September 2016 Exhibition match	FC Goa (India)	0–0	(Brazil) Boavista Sport Club	Rio de Janeiro, Brazil
	0		0

23 September 2016 Exhibition match	FC Goa (India)	1–0	(Brazil) Flamengo	Rio de Janeiro, Brazil
	1		0

== Player movement ==
=== Signings ===
==== In ====
Position	Player	Old club	Date	Ref
MF	(India) Pratesh Shirodkar	(India) Mumbai City	26 April 2016	

== Indian Super League ==
Pos	Team	Pld	W	D	L	GF	GA	GD	Pts	Qualification
4	Atlético de Kolkata (C)	14	4	8	2	16	14	+2	20	Advance to ISL Play-offs
5	NorthEast United	14	5	3	6	14	14	0	18	
6	Pune City	14	4	4	6	13	16	−3	16	
7	Chennaiyin	14	3	6	5	20	25	−5	15	
8	Goa	14	4	2	8	15	25	−10	14	

Source: Indian Super League
Rules for classification: 1) points; 2) head-to-head points; 3) head-to-head goal difference; 4) goal difference; 5) number of goals scored; 6) play-off match
(C) Champions

=== Results summary ===
Overall								Home						Away					
Pld	W	D	L	GF	GA	GD	Pts	W	D	L	GF	GA	GD	W	D	L	GF	GA	GD
14	4	2	8	15	25	−10	14	2	1	4	10	13	−3	2	1	4	5	12	−7

Source: Matches

=== Matches ===
Win Draw Loss

4 October 2016 1	NorthEast United FC	2–0	FC Goa	Guwahati
19:00 IST (UTC+5:30)	Alfaro 20', 62'	Report		Stadium: Indira Gandhi Athletic Stadium; Attendance: 27,816; Referee: C. R. Srikrishna

8 October 2016 2	FC Goa	1–2	FC Pune City	Margao
19:00 IST (UTC+5:30)	Coelho 33'	Report	Izumi 25'; Ndoye 90'	Stadium: Fatorda Stadium; Attendance: 19,003; Referee: Santosh Kumar

13 October 2016 3	Chennaiyin FC	0–2	FC Goa	Chennai
19:00 IST (UTC+5:30)		Report	Mulder 15'; Wadoo 26'	Stadium: Jawaharlal Nehru Stadium; Attendance: 18,213; Referee: Om Prakash Thakur

16 October 2016 4	Atletico de Kolkata	1–1	FC Goa	Kolkata
19:00 IST (UTC+5:30)	Doutie 6'	Report	Jofre 77' (pen.)	Stadium: Rabindra Sarobar Stadium; Attendance: 10,589; Referee: Fernando Guerrero

21 October 2016 5	Mumbai City FC	0–1	FC Goa	Mumbai
19:00 IST (UTC+5:30)		Report	Richarlyson 41'	Stadium: Mumbai Football Arena; Attendance: 7,690; Referee: Sandro Ricci

24 October 2016 6	FC Goa	1–2	Kerala Blasters FC	Margao
19:00 IST (UTC+5:30)	Júlio César 24'	Report	Rafi 46'; Belfort 84'	Stadium: Fatorda Stadium; Attendance: 18,157; Referee: C. R. Srikrishna

30 October 2016 7	FC Goa	0–2	Delhi Dynamos FC	Margao
19:00 IST (UTC+5:30)		Report	Marcelinho 72'; Gadze 76'	Stadium: Fatorda Stadium; Attendance: 17,989; Referee: Hettikamkanamge Perera

3 November 2016 8	FC Pune City	0–1	FC Goa	Pune
19:00 IST (UTC+5:30)		Report	Coelho 32'	Stadium: Balewadi Stadium; Attendance: 8,587; Referee: Ajit Dutta

8 November 2016 9	Kerala Blasters FC	2–1	FC Goa	Kochi
19:00 IST (UTC+5:30)	Belfort 48' (pen.); Vineeth 90+9'	Report	Coelho 9'	Stadium: Jawaharlal Nehru Stadium; Attendance: 34,196; Referee: Nick Waldron

11 November 2016 10	FC Goa	2–1	NorthEast United FC	Margao
19:00 IST (UTC+5:30)	R. Singh 62'; R. Fernandes 90+4'	Report	S. Singh 50'	Stadium: Fatorda Stadium; Attendance: 16,317; Referee: Santosh Kumar

16 November 2016 11	FC Goa	0–0	Mumbai City FC	Margao
19:00 IST (UTC+5:30)		Report		Stadium: Fatorda Stadium; Attendance: 18,917; Referee: Nivon Robesh Gamini

24 November 2016 12	FC Goa	1–2	Atletico de Kolkata	Margao
19:00 IST (UTC+5:30)	Desai 80'	Report	Belencoso 28'; Pearson 90+2'	Stadium: Fatorda Stadium; Attendance: 18,527; Referee: Nivon Robesh Gamini

27 November 2016 13	Delhi Dynamos FC	5–1	FC Goa	Delhi
19:00 IST (UTC+5:30)	Marcelinho 38', 48', 56'; Gadze 51', 57'	Report	Cardozo 31'	Stadium: Jawaharlal Nehru Stadium; Attendance: 18,243; Referee: Om Prakash Thakur

1 December 2016 14	FC Goa	5–4	Chennaiyin FC	Margao
19:00 IST (UTC+5:30)	Coelho 5', 76'; Jofre 21' (pen.); Tavora 68', 90+5'	Report	Lalrinzuala 4'; Arnolin 13' (o.g.); Omagbemi 28'; Riise 88' (pen.)	Stadium: Fatorda Stadium; Attendance: 14,717; Referee: Muhammad Taqi Jahari

== Player statistics ==
Season stats
#	Position	Player	GP	G
	MF	(India) Pratesh Shirodkar	0	0

== See also ==
- 2016–17 in Indian football
