= Laxmikant Kattimani =

Indian footballer

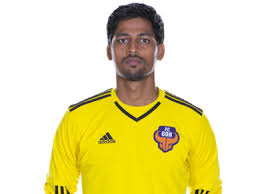

Personal information
- Full name: Laxmikant Kattimani
- Date of birth: 3 May 1989 (age 37)
- Place of birth: Cansaulim, Goa, India
- Height: 1.84 m (6 ft 1/2 in)
- Position: Goalkeeper

Team information
- Current team: Thrissur Magic

Senior career*
Years	Team	Apps	(Gls)
2008–2009	Vasco		
2009–2016	Dempo	42	(0)
2014–2016	→ Goa (loan)	25	(0)
2017–2019	Goa	14	(0)
2017	→ Mumbai (loan)	17	(0)
2019–2024	Hyderabad	57	(0)
2024–2025	Goa	6	(0)
2025–	Thrissur Magic		

International career
- India U19
2009–2016	India U23	2	(0)
- * Club domestic league appearances and goals as of 12:33, 24 October 2024 (UTC)

Laxmikant Kattimani (born 3 May 1989) is an Indian professional footballer who plays as a goalkeeper for the Super League Kerala club Thrissur Magic.

== Club career ==
=== Vasco SC ===
Born in Goa, Kattimani started his senior professional career with local club Vasco in 2008 who were about to make debut in I-League. On 26 September 2008, he made his I-League debut in opening game of the season against local rivals Sporting Goa which ended in a 1–0 loss. He kept his first professional cleansheet in next game against JCT FC on 2 October which ended in a goalless draw.

=== Dempo SC ===
In the following year, he switched to another Goan club Dempo and went on to represent the club for seven years. He won the I-League twice (2009–10 and 2011–12) with the side.

On 24 July 2014, Kattimani was drafted by Goa for their first even Indian Super League campaign. He was retained by the franchise in the following year. He featured for the club in the final match against Chennaiyin, which FC Goa lost by 3–2. He scored an own goal in the final minutes of the match.

Kattimani returned to Dempo for the 2015–16 I-League 2nd Division campaign and went on to win promotion to the I-League. Followingly he returned to FC Goa for the 2016 Indian Super League. In December 2016, he joined I-League club Mumbai on a loan deal.

=== FC Goa ===
On 5 July 2017, Goa announced that they had signed Kattimani permanently, who signed a three-year contract with the franchise.

=== Hyderabad FC ===
On 31 May 2020, Kattimani extended his contract till the end of 2020–21 season. On 23 April 2021, he once again extended his contract for another season. On 1 July 2022, Kattimani signed a new 2-year contract with Hyderabad.

== International career ==
Kattimani was included in the India under-23 team which won the 2009 SAFF Championship. He further represented the youth squad which competed in the 2010 Asian Games.

On 5 July 2011, India national football team manager Armando Colaco called him to the squad for friendlies against Maldives and Qatar.

== Career statistics ==
=== Club ===
As of match played 28 October 2023

Due to lack of information about stats before 2012-13 season the stats may vary for that time period.

- + indicates must be more
- ? indicates the stat is unknown

Appearances and goals by club, season and competition
Club	Season	League			Durand Cup		League cup (Note: Includes Federation Cup and Super Cup)		Continental (Note: includes AFC Cup)		Other		Total	
Club	Season	Division	Apps	Goals	Apps	Goals	Apps	Goals	Apps	Goals	Apps	Goals	Apps	Goals
Vasco SC	2008—09	I-League	16	0	—		3	0	—		—		19+	0
Dempo SC	2009—10	I-League	4+	0	0	0	?	0	—		?	0	4+	0
Dempo SC	2010—11	I-League	18+	0	—		?	0	3	0	1 (Note: Appearance in Indian Super Cup)	0	22+	0
Dempo SC	2011—12	I-League	6+	0	—		?	0	—		1 (Note: Appearance in Goa Super Cup)	0	7+	0
Dempo SC	2012—13	I-League	7	0	—		—		—		4 (Note: Appearances in Goa Professional League)	0	11+	0
Dempo SC	2013—14	I-League	15	0	—		4	0	—		9 (Note: Appearances in Goa Professional League)	0	28	0
Dempo SC	2014—15	I-League	20	0	—		5	0	—		4 (Note: 1 appearance in GFA Charity Cup and 3 in Goa Professional League)	0	29	0
Dempo SC	2015—16	I-League 2nd Division	14	0	—		—		—		3 (Note: 2 appearances in Goa Police Cup and 1 appearance in Goa Professional League)	0	17	0
Dempo SC	Total		84+	0	0	0	9+	0	3	0	22+	0	118+	0
FC Goa (Loan)	2014	Indian Super League	2	0	—		—		—		—		2	0
FC Goa (Loan)	2015	Indian Super League	13	0	—		—		—		—		13	0
FC Goa (Loan)	2016	Indian Super League	10	0	—		—		—		—		10	0
FC Goa	2017—18	Indian Super League	14	0	—		2	0	—		—		16	0
FC Goa	2018—19	Indian Super League	0	0	—		—		—		—		0	0
FC Goa	Total		39	0	0	0	2	0	0	0	0	0	41	0
Mumbai (Loan)	2016—17	I-League	17	0	—		—		—		—		17	0
Hyderabad FC	2019—20	Indian Super League	6	0	—		—		—		—		6	0
Hyderabad FC	2020—21	Indian Super League	14	0	—		—		—		—		14	0
Hyderabad FC	2021—22	Indian Super League	22	0	—		—		—		—		22	0
Hyderabad FC	2022—23	Indian Super League	6	0	3	0	0	0	—		—		9	0
Hyderabad FC	2023—24	Indian Super League	2	0	0	0	3	0	—		—		1	0
Hyderabad FC	Total		50	0	3	0	3	0	0	0	0	0	56	0
Career Total			167	0	3	0	17	0	3	0	22	0	212	0

== Honours ==
India U23

- SAFF Championship: 2009
- South Asian Games Silver medal: 2016

Dempo

- I-League: 2009–10, 2011–12

FC Goa

- Indian Super Cup: 2019

Hyderabad

- Indian Super League: 2021–22
