= Akashdeep Singh Kahlon =

Indian footballer (born 1993)

Akashdeep Singh
Personal information
- Full name: Akashdeep Singh Kahlon
- Date of birth: 26 July 1993 (age 33)
- Place of birth: Batala, Punjab, India
- Height: 1.76 m (5 ft 9 1/2 in)
- Position: Right back

Team information
- Current team: Namdhari
- Number: 5

Youth career
- 2012–2013: Indian Arrows

Senior career*
Years	Team	Apps	(Gls)
2015–2019	Minerva Punjab	28	(0)
2020–2021	Sudeva Delhi	11	(0)
2021	East Bengal	0	(0)
2021–2022	Rajasthan United	13	(0)
2022–2023	Real Kashmir	18	(0)
2023–	Namdhari	33	(0)
- * Club domestic league appearances and goals as of 12:33, 23 March 2025 (UTC)

Akashdeep Singh Kahlon (born 26 July 1993) is an Indian professional footballer who plays as a defender for Indian Football League club Namdhari.

== Career statistics ==
=== Club ===
As of 5 March 2023

Club	Season	League			Cup		AFC		Total	
Club	Season	Division	Apps	Goals	Apps	Goals	Apps	Goals	Apps	Goals
Minerva Punjab	2015–16	I-League 2nd Division	9	0	0	0	–		9	0
Minerva Punjab	2017–18	I-League	4	0	1 (Note: Appearance(s) in Super Cup)	0	–		5	0
Minerva Punjab	2018–19	I-League	15	0	0	0	7 (Note: Appearance(s) in AFC Champions League) (Note: Appearance(s) in AFC Cup)	0	22	0
Minerva Punjab	Minerva Punjab total		28	0	1	0	7	0	36	0
Sudeva Delhi	2020–21	I-League	11	0	0	0	–		11	0
East Bengal	2021–22	Indian Super League	0	0	0	0	–		0	0
Rajasthan United	2021–22	I-League	13	0	0	0	–		13	0
Real Kashmir	2022–23	I-League	18	0	0	0	–		18	0
Career total			70	0	1	0	7	0	78	0
