= Phrangki Buam =

Indian footballer (born 2000)

Personal information
- Date of birth: 16 December 2000 (age 25)
- Place of birth: Meghalaya, India
- Height: 1.70 m (5 ft 7 in)
- Positions: Right winger; attacking midfielder

Team information
- Current team: Shillong Lajong
- Number: 16

Youth career
- 2016–2017: Royal Wahingdoh
- 2017–2018: Shillong Lajong

Senior career*
Years	Team	Apps	(Gls)
2018–2020	Shillong Lajong	20	(6)
2019–2020	→ Bengaluru United (loan)	8	(2)
2020–2023	Goa	1	(0)
2021–2022	→ Mohammedan (loan)	7	(0)
2023	Real Kashmir	10	(1)
2023–	Shillong Lajong	51	(20)
- * Club domestic league appearances and goals as of 23:44, 23 May 2026 (UTC)

Phrangki Buam (born 16 December 2000) is an Indian professional footballer who plays as a forward for Indian Football League club Shillong Lajong.

== Career ==
=== Early career ===
Born in Meghalaya, Buam began his career in his home state with Wahingdoh, which competes in Shilong Premier League. He soon joined the youth side of Shillong Lajong, playing for the club in the Shillong Premier League. Buam is currently pursuing education, sociology and Khasi language in his Bachelor of Arts course at Shillong College.

=== Shillong Lajong ===
Phrangki Buam started his I-League career with Shillong Lajong in 2018. Buam was the second highest goal scorer by an Indian Player in the I-League 2018/19 season. He won Meghalaya State League and Shillong Premier League with Shillong Lajong in 2019–20 season and also was the Shillong Lajong's highest goal scorer with 24 goals in both tournaments.

=== Bengaluru United ===
On 22 January 2020, Phrangki Buam joined Bengaluru United on loan from Shillong Lajong

=== Goa ===
On 17 September 2020, Phrangki Buam joined Goa on a three-year deal from Shillong Lajong.

=== Mohammedan Sporting ===
Buam moved to I-League side Mohammedan Sporting on loan and was part of the team's 2021 Durand Cup campaign, and reached to the final, defeating Bengaluru United 4–2. On 3 October 2021, they lost the title winning match 1–0 to ISL side Goa.

== Career statistics ==
=== Club ===
As of match played 23 May 2026

Appearances and goals by club, season and competition
Club	Season	League			Cup		AFC		Total	
Club	Season	Division	Apps	Goals	Apps	Goals	Apps	Goals	Apps	Goals
Shillong Lajong	2018–19	I-League	20	6	0	0	—		20	6
Bengaluru United (loan)	2019–20	I-League 2nd Division	8	2	0	0	—		8	2
Goa	2020–21	Indian Super League	0	0	—		1 (Note: Appearance(s) in AFC Champions League)	0	1	0
Goa	2022–23	Indian Super League	0	0	4 (Note: Appearance(s) in Durand Cup)	1	—		4	1
Goa	Total		0	0	4	1	1	0	5	1
Mohammedan (loan)	2021–22	I-League	7	0	1	0	—		8	0
Real Kashmir	2022–23	I-League	10	1	0	0	—		10	1
Shillong Lajong	2023–24	I-League	15	6	3	0	—		18	6
Shillong Lajong	2024–25	I-League	22	6	5	0	—		27	6
Shillong Lajong	2025–26	Indian Football League	14	8	4	2	—		18	10
Shillong Lajong	Total		51	20	12	2	0	0	63	22
Career total			96	29	17	3	1	0	114	32

== Honours ==
Royal Wahingdoh

- Nike Premier Cup runner-up: 2016

Mohammedan Sporting

- Calcutta Football League: 2021

Individual

- 2018–19 I-League Best Young Player
