= Jerry Pulamte =

Indian footballer (born 1999)

Personal information
- Full name: Jerry Onesemas Pulamte
- Date of birth: 15 March 1999 (age 27)
- Place of birth: Haflong, Assam, India
- Height: 1.75 m (5 ft 9 in)
- Position: Winger

Team information
- Current team: Bengaluru United
- Number: 9

Youth career
- SAIL Football Academy

Senior career*
Years	Team	Apps	(Gls)
2017–2018	KLASA		
2018–2019	NEROCA	9	(0)
2019–2020	Wangoi FA		
2020–2021	Garhwal		
2021–2022	Sagolband United		
2022–2023	Real Kashmir	7	(1)
2023–	Bengaluru United		
- * Club domestic league appearances and goals as of 18:39, 12 December 2022 (UTC)

Jerry Onesemas Pulamte ( Jerry Hmar ) (born 15 March 1999) is an Indian professional footballer who plays as a winger for I-League club Bengaluru United.

== Playing career ==
After training with the Mohun Bagan-affiliated SAIL Academy as a teenager, Pulamte spent the 2017–18 season with Keinou Library & Sports Association (KLASA), a semi-professional club participating in the Manipur State League (MSL). On 10 September 2017, he scored the lone goal in a 1–0 victory over his future club, NEROCA, after just 20 seconds, setting a new MSL record for the quickest goal in league history. In fact, he finished the season as the league's top scorer.

In May 2018, Pulamte signed a two-year contract with I-League club NEROCA. He made his professional debut on 27 October, replacing Manglem Meitei in the 77th minute of a 2–0 defeat to East Bengal.

In September 2022, Pulamte signed with Real Kashmir, returning to the I-League after stints with Wangoi FA, Garhwal and Sagolband United.

== Career statistics ==
=== Club ===
As of 12 December 2022

Club	Season	League			Cup		AFC		Total	
Club	Season	Division	Apps	Goals	Apps	Goals	Apps	Goals	Apps	Goals
NEROCA	2018–19	I-League	9	0	0	0	—		9	0
Real Kashmir	2022–23	I-League	7	1	0	0	—		7	1
Career total			16	1	0	0	0	0	16	1

== Honours ==
Individual

- Manipur State League top scorer: 2017–18
