= Manuel Arana =

Spanish footballer

Personal information
- Full name: Manuel Jesús Arana Rodríguez
- Date of birth: 3 December 1984 (age 41)
- Place of birth: Seville, Spain
- Height: 1.75 m (5 ft 9 in)
- Position: Winger

Youth career
- Betis

Senior career*
Years	Team	Apps	(Gls)
2002–2005	Betis B	30	(3)
2005–2007	Castellón B	65	(11)
2007–2009	Castellón	70	(14)
2009–2012	Racing Santander	73	(7)
2012–2013	Rayo Vallecano	2	(0)
2013–2014	Recreativo	42	(9)
2014–2016	Mallorca	52	(10)
2016–2017	Brisbane Roar	18	(0)
2017–2018	Goa	10	(3)
2018	→ Delhi Dynamos (loan)	6	(1)
2018–2019	Europa	20	(10)
2020	Utrera	5	(0)
Total		393	(68)
- * Club domestic league appearances and goals

Manuel Jesús Arana Rodríguez (born 3 December 1984) is a Spanish former professional footballer who played as a right winger.

He appeared in 75 La Liga matches over four seasons, totalling seven goals for Racing de Santander and Rayo Vallecano. He added 164 appearances and 33 goals in the Segunda División, and also played in Australia, India and Gibraltar.

== Club career ==
Arana was born in Seville, Andalusia. Not having been able to reach the first team at Real Betis in his hometown, he signed with CD Castellón where he would first appear professionally in 2006–07's Segunda División, playing one game; in the following two seasons, also at that level, he proceeded to be regularly utilised.

On 29 June 2009, Arana moved to La Liga with Racing de Santander, on a four-year contract. He made his debut in the competition on 30 August in a 1–4 home loss against Getafe CF, and scored in his third match for a 2–1 away win over Málaga CF; he added three more goals until the end of the campaign (totalling 1,749 minutes) as the side from Cantabria managed to retain their status.

Arana terminated his contract with Racing in late August 2012, following the club's top-flight relegation. Subsequently, he joined Rayo Vallecano of the same league.

On 7 July 2014, Arana left Recreativo de Huelva and agreed to a two-year deal at RCD Mallorca also in the second tier. On 30 September 2016, the 31-year-old moved abroad for the first time in his career after being confirmed as the third visa player signing by Brisbane Roar FC for the 2016–17 season.

On 12 July 2017, Arana switched clubs and countries again, joining FC Goa. He scored his first goal for them on 25 November, but in a 2–1 away defeat to Mumbai City FC. On 31 January 2018, he was loaned to fellow Indian Super League team Delhi Dynamos FC until March.

== Career statistics ==
As of match played on 2 March 2018

Club	Season	League			Cup		Other		Total	
Club	Season	Division	Apps	Goals	Apps	Goals	Apps	Goals	Apps	Goals
Castellón	2006–07	Segunda División	1	0	2	0	—		3	0
Castellón	2007–08	Segunda División	28	6	0	0	—		28	6
Castellón	2008–09	Segunda División	41	8	3	0	—		44	8
Castellón	Total		70	14	5	0	—		75	14
Racing Santander	2009–10	La Liga	31	4	3	0	—		34	4
Racing Santander	2010–11	La Liga	14	1	1	0	—		15	1
Racing Santander	2011–12	La Liga	28	2	1	0	—		29	2
Racing Santander	Total		73	7	5	0	—		78	7
Rayo Vallecano	2012–13	La Liga	2	0	1	0	—		3	0
Recreativo	2012–13	Segunda División	18	1	0	0	—		18	1
Recreativo	2013–14	Segunda División	24	8	2	0	—		26	8
Recreativo	Total		42	9	2	0	—		44	9
Mallorca	2014–15	Segunda División	32	8	0	0	—		32	8
Mallorca	2015–16	Segunda División	20	2	0	0	—		20	2
Mallorca	Total		52	10	0	0	—		52	10
Brisbane Roar	2016–17	A-League	18	0	0	0	6 (Note: Appearances in AFC Champions League)	2	24	2
Goa	2017–18	Indian Super League	10	3	—		—		10	3
Delhi Dynamos	2017–18	Indian Super League	6	1	—		—		6	1
Career total			273	44	13	0	6	2	292	46
