= Park Jong-oh =

Korean association football player

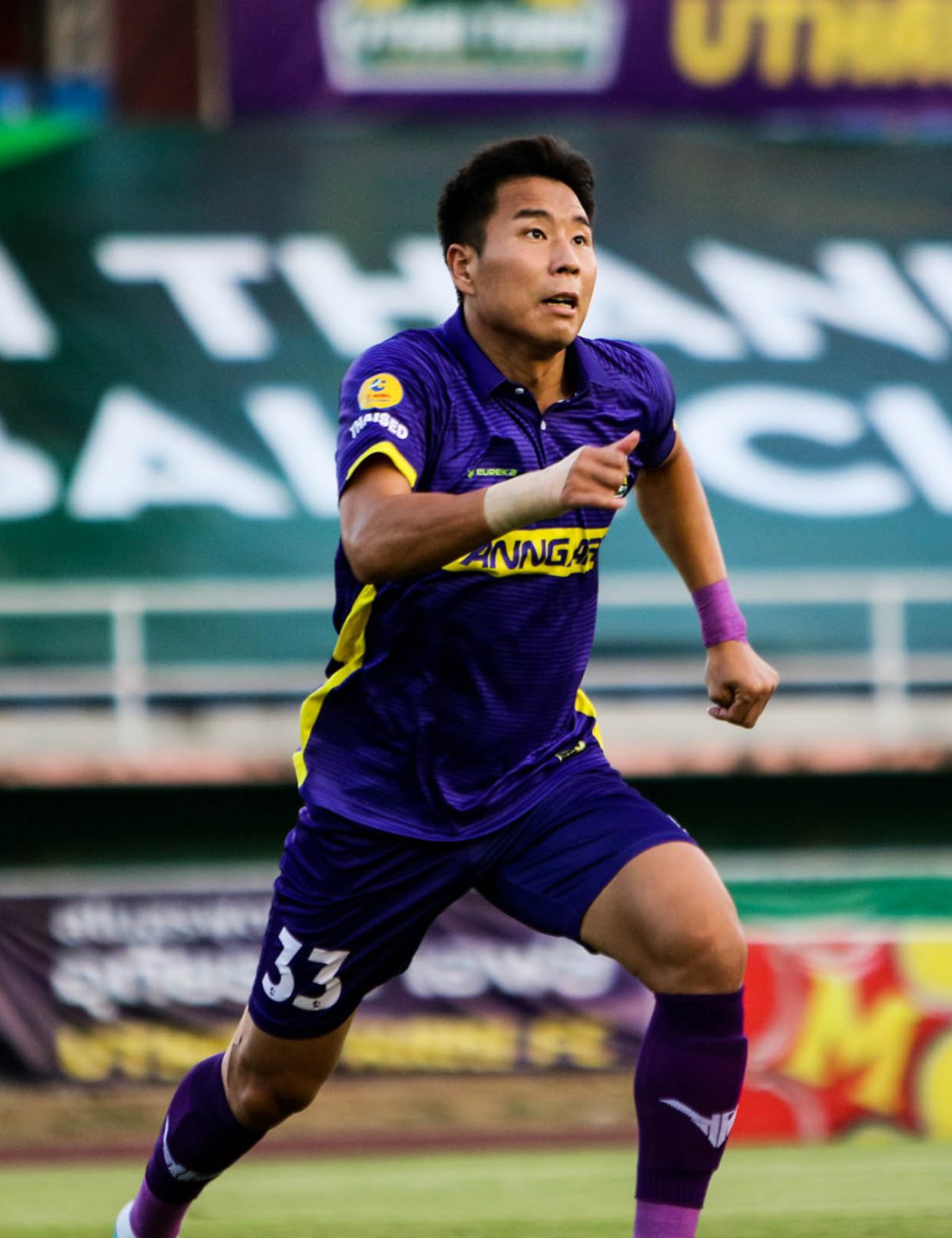
- Jong-oh playing with Uthai Thani in 2021

Personal information
- Date of birth: 12 April 1991 (age 35)
- Place of birth: South Korea
- Height: 1.88 m (6 ft 2 in)
- Position: Centre-back

Youth career
- 2007–2009: Boin High School
- 2010–2013: Hanyang University

Senior career*
Years	Team	Apps	(Gls)
2014–2015	Bucheon	2	(0)
2015–2016	Yongin City	33	(0)
2017–2018	Chainat Hornbill	14	(0)
2018–2020	Yangpyeong	4	(0)
2020–2021	Uthai Thani	27	(1)
2022	Real Kashmir	7	(1)
- * Club domestic league appearances and goals as of 19:44, 2 April 2022 (UTC)

- Park Jong-oh
- Hangul: 박종오
- RR: Bak Jongo
- MR: Pak Chongo

Park Jong-oh (Korean: 박종오; born 12 April 1991) is a South Korean professional footballer who plays as a defender.

== Club career ==
=== Real Kashmir ===
In December 2021, Park signed for I-League club Real Kashmir.

On 4 March, he made his debut for the club against Kenkre in the I-League, in a thrilling 1–1 stalemate. He scored his first goal for the club against Indian Arrows on 2 April, which ended in a 1–1 stalemate. Rohmingthanga Bawlte played in a cross into the back post from the right flank, and Park arrived into the box to finish with a first time volley back across goal.

== Career statistics ==
=== Club ===
As of 2 April 2022

Club	Season	League			Cup		Continental		Total	
Club	Season	Division	Apps	Goals	Apps	Goals	Apps	Goals	Apps	Goals
Bucheon	2014	K League Challenge	2	0	0	0	–		2	0
Bucheon	2015	K League Challenge	0	0	0	0	–		0	0
Bucheon	Bucheon total		2	0	0	0	0	0	2	0
Yongin City	2015	Korea National League	20	0	0	0	–		20	0
Yongin City	2016	Korea National League	13	0	0	0	–		13	0
Yongin City	Yongin City total		33	0	0	0	0	0	33	0
Chainat Hornbill	2018	Thai League 1	14	0	1 (Note: Appearances in the Thai FA Cup)	0	–		15	0
Yangpyeong	2020	K4 League	4	0	1 (Note: Appearances in the Korean FA Cup)	0	–		5	0
Uthai Thani	2020–21	Thai League 2	27	1	0	0	–		27	1
Real Kashmir	2021–22	I-League	7	1	0	0	–		7	1
Career total			87	2	2	0	0	0	89	2
