= Lamine Moro =

Ghanaian footballer (born 1994)

Personal information
- Date of birth: 13 February 1994 (age 32)
- Place of birth: Accra, Ghana
- Height: 1.82 m (6 ft 0 in)
- Position: Centre-back

Team information
- Current team: Namdhari FC
- Number: 55

Senior career*
Years	Team	Apps	(Gls)
2009–2012	Feyenoord Fetteh		
2009–2010	→ Sekondi Hasaacas (loan)		
2012–2013	Al-Quwa Al-Jawiya		
2013–2017	Liberty Professionals	9	(0)
2014–2015	→ US Orléans (loan)		
2017–2019	Buildcon		
2019–2021	Young Africans		
2021–2022	AS Kigali		
2022	Newroz		
2022–2023	Real Kashmir	8	(2)
2023	Mohammedan		
2023–2024	Naft Al-Basra SC		
2024–2025	Dhofar Club		
2025–	Namdhari FC		

International career
	Ghana U20	11	(0)
- * Club domestic league appearances and goals

Lamine Moro (born 13 February 1994) is a Ghanaian professional footballer who plays as a centre-back.

== Early life ==
Lamine Moro playing the test match against TP Mazembe in March 2017 in Ndola Stadium

Moro Lamine was born in Accra, Ghana. He began his junior career in West African Football Academy and elaborated his skills there during all his junior career. When was 15 years old, he began his professional career in the Ghanean Football Sekondi Hasaacas Football Club.

== Club career ==
=== Youth career ===
- 2007-2009: West African Football Academy, Ghana

=== Senior career ===
- Loan 2009-2010: Sekondi Hasaacas Football Club, Ghana
- 2010-2012: West African Football Academy, Ghana
- 2012-2013: Nadi Al-Quwa Al-Jawiya Al-Riyadh, Iraq
- 2013-2016: Liberty Professionals FC, Ghana
- Loan 2014-2015: Union Sportive Orléans Loiret Football, France
- 2016-2019 : Buildcon FC, Zambia (47 matches,3 goals)
- 2019- : Young Africans S.C, Tanzania

=== Real Kashmir ===
In October 2022, I-League club Real Kashmir confirmed the signing of Moro, on a one-year deal. On 13 November, he made his professional debut in India, playing for Real Kashmir in the I-League against NEROCA, winning 1–0. Six days later, he scored his first goal for the club against Rajasthan United, in a 2–0 win.

== International career ==
- Ghana U-20 (11 match, 0 goal)

== Career statistics ==
=== Club ===
As of 22 December 2022

Club	Season	League			Cup		Continental		Total	
Club	Season	Division	Apps	Goals	Apps	Goals	Apps	Goals	Apps	Goals
Liberty; Professionals	2016	Ghana Premier League	9	0	0	0	—		9	0
Young Africans	2019–20	Tanzanian Premier League	0	0	0	0	5 (Note: Appearance(s) in CAF Champions League) (Note: Appearance(s) in CAF Confederation Cup)	0	5	0
Real Kashmir	2022–23	I-League	8	2	0	0	—		8	2
Career total			17	2	0	0	5	0	22	2
