= Lalnuntluanga Bawitlung =

Indian footballer (born 1999)

Personal information
- Date of birth: 27 November 1999 (age 26)
- Place of birth: Mizoram, India
- Height: 1.72 m (5 ft 8 in)
- Position: Midfielder

Team information
- Current team: Mumbai City

Youth career
- –2017: AIFF Elite Academy
- 2017–2019: Bengaluru U18

Senior career*
Years	Team	Apps	(Gls)
2019	Bengaluru B	6	(2)
2019–2021	Goa B	5	(0)
2021–2022	Ramhlun North		
2022	Ramkrishna Club		
2022	Swaraj FC		
2022–2023	Real Kashmir	20	(2)
2023–2025	Sreenidi Deccan	41	(2)
2025–	Mumbai City	8	(0)
- * Club domestic league appearances and goals as of 16:50, 18 April 2026 (UTC)

Lalnuntluanga Bawitlung (born 27 November 1999) is an Indian professional footballer who plays as a midfielder for Indian Super League club Mumbai City.

== Career ==
=== Real Kashmir ===
On 18 September 2022, Bawitlung was snapped up by I-League club Real Kashmir, on a one-year deal. He made his professional career debut against NEROCA, on 13 November in a 1–0 away win.

=== Mumbai City FC ===
On 8 June 2025, ISL club Mumbai City confirmed Bawitlung's signing on a three-year contract, valid until the end of the 2027–28 season.

== Career statistics ==
As of 11 March 2023

Club	Season	League			Cup		AFC		Total	
Club	Season	Division	Apps	Goals	Apps	Goals	Apps	Goals	Apps	Goals
Bengaluru B	2018–19	I-League 2nd Division	6	2	0	0	–		6	2
Goa B	2019–20	I-League 2nd Division	5	0	0	0	–		5	0
Real Kashmir	2022–23	I-League	20	2	0	0	–		20	2
Sreenidi Deccan	2023–24	I-League	20	2	3 (Note: Appearance(s) in Super Cup)	0	–		23	2
Sreenidi Deccan	2024–25	I-League	21	0	0	0	–		21	0
Sreenidi Deccan	Total		41	2	3	0	0	0	44	2
Mumbai City	2025–26	Indian Super League	0	0	0	0	–		0	0
Career total			72	6	3	0	0	0	75	6
