= Adrián Colunga =

Spanish footballer (born 1984)

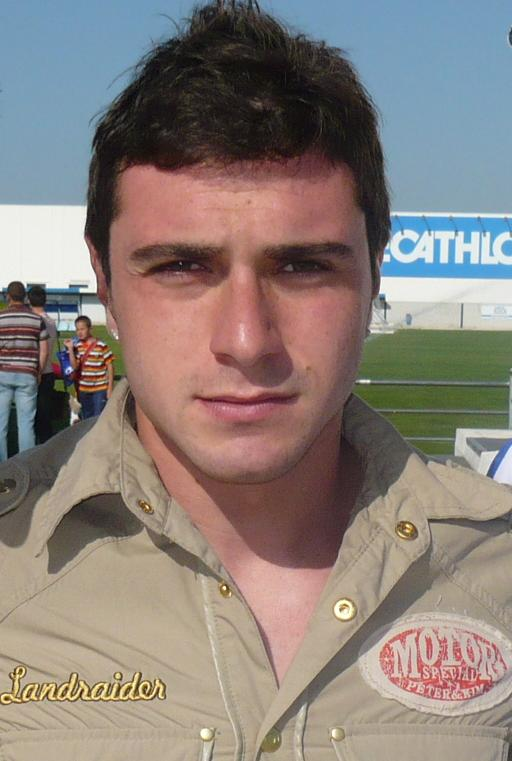
- Colunga as a Recreativo player (2009)

Personal information
- Full name: Adrián Colunga Pérez
- Date of birth: 17 November 1984 (age 41)
- Place of birth: Oviedo, Spain
- Height: 1.72 m (5 ft 8 in)
- Position: Forward

Team information
- Current team: Algeciras (manager)

Youth career
- Covadonga
- Sporting Gijón

Senior career*
Years	Team	Apps	(Gls)
2002–2006	Sporting Gijón B	28	(9)
2002	→ Turón (loan)	8	(8)
2003	→ Marino (loan)	5	(0)
2003–2004	→ Ceares (loan)	25	(8)
2005–2006	→ Marino (loan)	14	(2)
2006	Soledad	16	(9)
2006–2007	Pájara Playas	37	(10)
2007–2008	Las Palmas	34	(13)
2008–2010	Recreativo	46	(11)
2010	→ Zaragoza (loan)	16	(7)
2010–2014	Getafe	82	(17)
2012	→ Sporting Gijón (loan)	17	(3)
2014–2015	Brighton & Hove Albion	17	(3)
2015	→ Granada (loan)	4	(0)
2016	Mallorca	8	(2)
2016–2017	Anorthosis	18	(1)
2017–2018	Goa	2	(1)
Total		377	(104)

Managerial career
- 2020–2021: Mallorca (youth)
- 2021–2022: San Francisco (youth)
- 2023–2024: Murcia (youth)
- 2024–2025: DAC Dunajská Streda (assistant)
- 2025: Murcia B
- 2025–2026: Murcia
- 2026–: Algeciras
- * Club domestic league appearances and goals

Adrián Colunga Pérez (born 17 November 1984) is a Spanish former professional footballer who played as a forward. He is currently manager of Primera Federación club Algeciras.

He appeared in 152 La Liga matches over seven seasons, scoring 36 goals for Recreativo, Zaragoza, Getafe, Sporting de Gijón and Granada. He added 54 games and 17 goals in the Segunda División, and also competed in England, Cyprus and India.

== Playing career ==
Colunga was born in Oviedo, Asturias. After unsuccessfully emerging through Sporting de Gijón's youth system he made his professional debut on loan, in the Segunda División B with Marino de Luanco – also in his native region – going on to serve several others in the third tier and Tercera División while also spending the 2004–05 season with Sporting's reserves.

In January 2006, Colunga was definitely released by Gijón and, after a spell in the fourth division and another in the third, joined UD Las Palmas of Segunda División. He scored 13 league goals (second-best in the squad) in the 2007–08 campaign for a Canary Islands side that was threatened with relegation until the last month of competition.

Colunga was then bought by Recreativo de Huelva in La Liga, on a four-year contract worth €2.7 million. In his debut for the team, on 31 August 2008, he scored the game's only goal in an away win against Andalusia neighbours Real Betis.

Alternating between starts and games from the bench in his first year, Colunga entered the club's history when he scored a penalty kick in a 4–1 loss at Deportivo de La Coruña on 21 December, his fourth consecutive game achieving the feat; Spanish football pundit Guillem Balagué compared the player, in his weekly report of first division encounters, to Valencia CF's David Villa. Despite a first fruitful year individually, Recre ranked last.

On 23 January 2010, after experiencing personal problems in the new season at Recreativo, which included a confrontation with club fans, Colunga was loaned to Real Zaragoza of the top flight until June. He scored on his debut eight days later, a 3–1 away victory over CD Tenerife, and finished the campaign as the team's top scorer in only four months of play, with the Aragonese finally escaping relegation.

On 5 August 2010, Colunga was sold to Getafe CF as Kepa Blanco moved in the opposite direction. He was loaned to Sporting Gijón in January 2012, scoring three times in 13 starts during his short spell but suffering top-division relegation.

Colunga transferred to Brighton & Hove Albion on 25 August 2014 for an undisclosed fee, signing a two-year contract. He scored on his debut the following day, contributing to a 4–2 away defeat of Swindon Town in the second round of the League Cup. He added a further three in the English Championship before the end of the year, with away strikes against Bournemouth (3–2 loss), Norwich City (3–3) and Fulham (2–0).

Following the appointment of Chris Hughton as new manager, Colunga found first-team opportunities difficult and, in the very last day of the 2015 January transfer window, joined Granada CF on a loan deal lasting until the end of the season, with the option of a permanent transfer in June. However, having featured rarely, he returned to Brighton and eventually had his contract terminated by mutual consent on 7 October.

On 2 September 2017, the 32-year-old Colunga switched to the Indian Super League with FC Goa after stints with RCD Mallorca and Cypriot club Anorthosis Famagusta FC. He made his debut on 16 December, scoring in the last minutes of a 5–1 victory against Delhi Dynamos FC.

Colunga's contract was terminated by mutual agreement on 25 January 2018, when he refused to play second-fiddle to compatriot Coro. Four days later, he announced his retirement.

== Coaching career ==
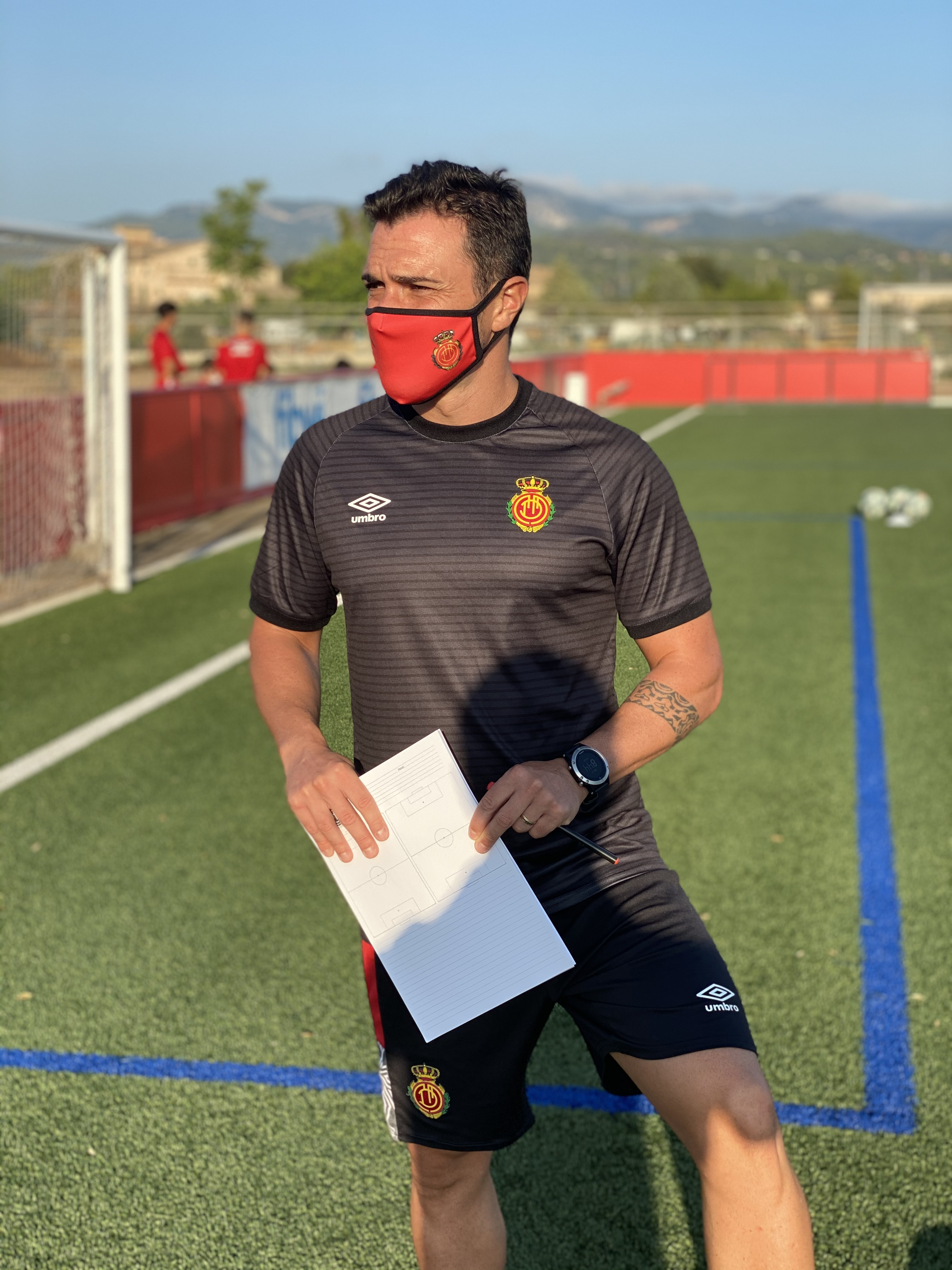
Colunga coaching Mallorca's youths in 2020

On 6 August 2020, shortly after obtaining his coaching licence, Colunga returned to Mallorca as manager of the Juvenil B team. The following 25 July, he was appointed at feeder club CD San Francisco in the División de Honor.

Colunga took over Real Murcia CF's Juvenil A squad on 30 September 2023. In February 2024, he left to join Xisco Muñoz's staff at FC DAC 1904 Dunajská Streda of the Slovak First Football League.

On 14 July 2025, Colunga returned to Murcia, now taking charge of their reserves in the Tercera Federación. On 28 October, he was named caretaker of the main squad after Joseba Etxeberria's dismissal, being appointed on a permanent basis on 20 November.

On 23 February 2026, after a run of six games without a win placed the team just above the relegation zone, the last being a 2–1 home loss against FC Cartagena in a regional derby, Colunga was sacked. On 7 June, he became head coach of fellow Primera Federación side Algeciras CF.

== Career statistics ==
Club	Season	League			Cup		Other		Total	
Club	Season	Division	Apps	Goals	Apps	Goals	Apps	Goals	Apps	Goals
Marino (loan)	2002–03	Segunda División B	5	0	0	0	—		5	0
Ceares (loan)	2003–04	Tercera División	25	7	0	0	—		25	7
Sporting Gijón B	2004–05	Tercera División	27	6	0	0	—		27	6
Marino (loan)	2005–06	Segunda División B	14	2	0	0	—		14	2
Pájara Playas (loan)	2006–07	Segunda División B	37	10	0	0	2 (Note: Appearances in Segunda División B play-offs)	2	39	12
Las Palmas	2007–08	Segunda División	33	13	3	0	—		36	13
Recreativo	2008–09	La Liga	33	9	1	0	—		34	9
Recreativo	2009–10	Segunda División	13	2	1	0	—		14	2
Recreativo	Total		46	11	2	0	—		48	11
Zaragoza (loan)	2009–10	La Liga	16	7	0	0	—		16	7
Getafe	2010–11	La Liga	29	7	1	0	7 (Note: Appearances in UEFA Europa League)	0	37	7
Getafe	2011–12	La Liga	4	0	2	0	—		6	0
Getafe	2012–13	La Liga	22	6	2	0	—		24	6
Getafe	2013–14	La Liga	27	4	4	1	—		31	5
Getafe	Total		82	17	9	1	7	0	98	18
Sporting Gijón (loan)	2011–12	La Liga	17	3	0	0	—		17	3
Brighton & Hove Albion	2014–15	Championship	17	3	4	1	—		21	4
Granada (loan)	2014–15	La Liga	4	0	0	0	—		4	0
Mallorca	2015–16	Segunda División	7	2	0	0	—		7	2
Mallorca	2016–17	Segunda División	1	0	0	0	—		1	0
Mallorca	Total		8	2	0	0	—		8	2
Anorthosis	2016–17	Cypriot First Division	18	1	2	1	—		20	2
Goa	2017–18	Indian Super League	2	1	—		—		2	1
Career total			351	83	20	3	9	2	380	88

== Managerial statistics ==
As of 25 October 2026

Managerial record by team and tenure
Team	Nat	From	To	Record								Ref
Team	Nat	From	To	G	W	D	L	GF	GA	GD	Win %	Ref
Murcia B	(Spain)	14 July 2025	28 October 2025	8	5	2	1	13	8	+5	62.50	
Murcia	(Spain)	28 October 2025	23 February 2026	18	8	4	6	21	19	+2	44.44	
Algeciras	(Spain)	7 June 2026	Present	9	4	1	4	13	13	+0	44.44	
Total				35	17	7	11	47	40	+7	48.57	—
