= Samuel Kynshi =

Indian footballer (born 2000)

Personal information
- Full name: Samuel James Lyngdoh Kynshi
- Date of birth: 11 March 2000 (age 26)
- Place of birth: Meghalaya, India
- Height: 1.63 m (5 ft 4 in)
- Position: Winger

Team information
- Current team: Gokulam Kerala
- Number: 55

Senior career*
Years	Team	Apps	(Gls)
2018–2020	Shillong Lajong	24	(6)
2020	→ Kerala Blasters B (loan)	5	(1)
2020–2022	Real Kashmir	22	(0)
2022	Mawlai SC		
2022–2023	Real Kashmir	21	(6)
2023–2025	Punjab	5	(0)
2025	→ Rajasthan United (loan)	8	(0)
2025–	Gokulam Kerala	3	(0)

International career^{‡}
2023	India U23	4	(0)
- * Club domestic league appearances and goals as of 21:14, 26 March 2026 (UTC) ‡ National team caps and goals as of 23:44, 28 September 2023 (UTC)

Samuel James Lyngdoh Kynshi (born 11 March 2000) is an Indian professional footballer who plays as a forward for I-League club Gokulam Kerala.

== Career ==
Kynshi was promoted to Shillong Lajong senior team from their junior team after his good show in 2017 Under–18 Shillong Premier League and 2017 Shillong Premier League. He made his I-League debut against Gokulam Kerala FC, coming in as substitute for Kynsailang Khongsit. He scored his first goal in second game of the season against Churchill Brothers coming as substitute in second half of the match.

=== Punjab ===
On 8 May 2023, Punjab completed the signing of Kynshi ahead of their maiden Indian Super League campaign, on a multi-year contract.

== Career statistics ==
=== Club ===
As of 27 February 2026

Club	Season	League			Cup		AFC		Total	
Club	Season	Division	Apps	Goals	Apps	Goals	Apps	Goals	Apps	Goals
Shillong Lajong	2017–18	I-League	5	1	1 (Note: Appearance(s) in Super Cup)	0	—		6	1
Shillong Lajong	2018–19	I-League	19	5	0	0	—		19	5
Shillong Lajong	Total		24	6	1	0	0	0	25	6
Kerala Blasters B (loan)	2020	I-League 2nd Division	5	1	0	0	—		5	1
Real Kashmir	2020–21	I-League	11	0	0	0	—		11	0
Real Kashmir	2021–22	I-League	11	0	0	0	—		11	0
Real Kashmir	2022–23	I-League	21	6	0	0	—		21	6
Real Kashmir	Total		43	6	0	0	0	0	43	6
Punjab	2023–24	Indian Super League	5	0	3 (Note: Appearance(s) in Durand Cup)	0	—		8	0
Punjab	2024–25	Indian Super League	0	0	2	0	—		2	0
Punjab	Total		5	0	5	0	0	0	10	0
Rajasthan United (loan)	2024–25	I-League	8	0	0	0	—		8	0
Gokulam Kerala	2025–26	I-League	1	0	2 (Note: Appearance(s) in Super Cup)	0	—		3	0
Career total			86	13	8	0	0	0	94	13

== Honours ==
Real Kashmir

- IFA Shield: 2020
