= Momar Ndoye =

Senegalese footballer (born 1992)

Personal information
- Date of birth: 10 March 1992 (age 34)
- Place of birth: Pikine, Senegal
- Height: 1.78 m (5 ft 10 in)
- Position: Midfielder

Team information
- Current team: Boca Gibraltar

Youth career
- Atlético Madrid

Senior career*
Years	Team	Apps	(Gls)
2011–2015	Atlético Madrid B	94	(7)
2015–2016	Muro	28	(6)
2016–2017	Pune City	11	(1)
2017	Arandina	13	(3)
2017–2018	SS Reyes		
2018–	Boca Gibraltar	0	(0)
- * Club domestic league appearances and goals as of 2 September 2018

Momar Ndoye (born 10 March 1992) is a Senegalese professional footballer who plays as a midfielder for Gibraltarian club Boca Gibraltar.

== Career ==
Born in Pikine, Ndoye began his career in Spain, making his debut for the Atlético Madrid B side on 16 August 2011 against RSD Alcalá in the Segunda División B. He came on as a halftime substitute for Roberto as Madrid B drew 1–1. After playing for the reserves in the third division for a while, Ndoye earned a call-up to the Atlético Madrid first-team and appeared on the bench for the side on 5 April 2012 against Hannover 96 in the Europa League. He did not see any game time, however. Ndoye also appeared on the bench for Madrid in the UEFA Champions League on 26 November 2013 against Zenit Saint Petersburg. He again did not see time on the field.

In 2015, Ndoye left Madrid to sign for Muro. He stayed at the club for a year before leaving Spain and signing for Indian Super League side Pune City. He made his professional debut with the club on 3 October 2016 against Mumbai City. He came on as a halftime substitute for Gustavo Oberman as Pune City lost 1–0.

== Career statistics ==
As of 3 October 2016

Club	Season	League			League Cup		Domestic Cup		Continental		Total	
Club	Season	Division	Apps	Goals	Apps	Goals	Apps	Goals	Apps	Goals	Apps	Goals
Pune City	2016	ISL	1	0	0	0	—	—	—	—	1	0
Career total			1	0	0	0	0	0	0	0	1	0
