= Sergio Juste =

Spanish footballer (born 1992)

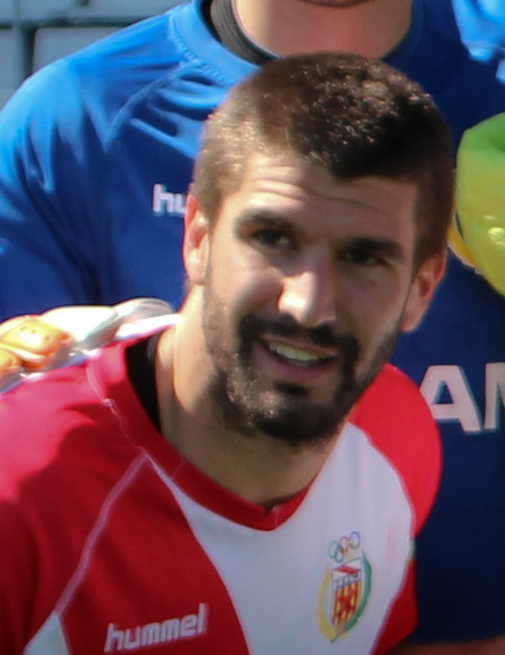
- Juste with Hospitalet in 2019

Personal information
- Full name: Sergio Juste Marín
- Date of birth: 12 January 1992 (age 34)
- Place of birth: Tarragona, Spain
- Height: 1.81 m (5 ft 11 in)
- Position: Defender

Youth career
- 2001–2002: Barcelona
- 2002–2009: Gimnàstic

Senior career*
Years	Team	Apps	(Gls)
2009–2011	Pobla Mafumet	29	(1)
2009–2012	Gimnàstic	25	(0)
2012–2016	Barcelona B	21	(0)
2016–2017	Hospitalet	36	(2)
2017–2018	Goa	11	(1)
2018–2022	Hospitalet	100	(5)
2022–2023	Grama	20	(0)
Total		242	(9)

International career
2011	Catalonia	1	(0)
- * Club domestic league appearances and goals

Sergio Juste Marín (born 12 January 1992), also known as Chechi, is a Spanish former professional footballer. Mainly a central defender, he could also play as a right-back.

== Club career ==
=== Gimnàstic ===
Born in Tarragona, Catalonia, Juste began playing football with FC Barcelona, moving in early 2009 to neighbouring Gimnàstic de Tarragona to complete his development. On 20 June that year, at just 17, he made his senior debut, playing 32 minutes in a 1–0 away loss against SD Eibar as a substitute for Nebojša Marinković.

In 2011–12, with the club still in the Segunda División, Juste was promoted to the main squad – after spending several years with farm team CF Pobla de Mafumet – following an injury crisis, and started the first match of the season on 28 August, against Real Valladolid.

=== Barcelona ===
In late June 2012, after Nàstic suffered relegation, Juste returned to his first club Barcelona, signing a two-year contract and being assigned to the reserves. However, on 15 July, the former announced that he would return for preseason play.

On 6 August 2012, Gimnàstic and Barça reached an agreement for Juste, and he agreed to a three-year deal with a €12 million buyout clause. He picked up an injury in mid-August, only returning on 8 January 2013; he was again downed by physical problems shortly after, this time in the knee, being sidelined for the rest of the campaign.

Juste damaged his anterior cruciate ligament on 20 August 2013, going on to miss a further several months. He finally made his debut for Barcelona B on 31 May of the following year, playing the last three minutes of a 4–3 home win over AD Alcorcón.

Despite appearing in just one match in two years, Juste was named the B team's captain on 22 August 2014.

=== Goa ===
Juste moved abroad for the first time on 14 August 2017, signing for Indian Super League franchise FC Goa. He scored his only goal for them on 28 February 2018, opening the 5–1 home defeat of ATK.

== International career ==
On 31 December 2011, Juste made his debut for Catalonia, in a friendly with Tunisia.

== Career statistics ==
As of match played 21 February 2021

Club	Season	League			Cup		Other		Total	
Club	Season	Division	Apps	Goals	Apps	Goals	Apps	Goals	Apps	Goals
Gimnàstic	2008–09	Segunda División	1	0	0	0	—		1	0
Gimnàstic	2011–12	Segunda División	24	0	1	0	—		25	0
Gimnàstic	Total		25	0	1	0	—		26	0
Barcelona B	2012–13	Segunda División	0	0	—		—		0	0
Barcelona B	2013–14	Segunda División	1	0	—		—		1	0
Barcelona B	2014–15	Segunda División	15	0	—		—		15	0
Barcelona B	2015–16	Segunda División B	5	0	—		—		5	0
Barcelona B	Total		21	0	—		—		21	0
Hospitalet	2016–17	Segunda División B	36	2	0	0	—		36	2
Goa	2017–18	Indian Super League	11	1	1	0	—		12	1
Hospitalet	2018–19	Tercera División	26	1	—		2	0	28	1
Hospitalet	2019–20	Tercera División	2	0	—		—		2	0
Hospitalet	2020–21	Segunda División B	10	0	—		—		10	0
Hospitalet	Total		38	1	—		2	0	40	1
Career total			131	4	2	0	2	0	135	4
