= Richard Osei Agyemang =

Ghanaian footballer (born 1995)

Richard Agyemang
Personal information
- Full name: Richard Osei Agyemang
- Date of birth: 6 April 1995 (age 31)
- Place of birth: Ghana
- Height: 1.80 m (5 ft 11 in)
- Position: Centre-back

Team information
- Current team: Calicut
- Number: 5

Senior career*
Years	Team	Apps	(Gls)
–2016	Berekum Chelsea	6	(0)
2016–2018	Asante Kotoko	17	(0)
2018–2023	Ashanti Gold	54	(2)
2023	Real Kashmir	10	(4)
2023–2024	Dhangadhi F.C.	9	(1)
2024–	Calicut	21	(2)
- * Club domestic league appearances and goals as of 14 December 2025

Richard Osei Agyemang (born 6 April 1995) is a Ghanaian professional footballer who plays as a defender for Super League Kerala club Calicut.

== Club career ==
=== Berekum Chelsea ===
Agyemang played for Bono-based team Berekum Chelsea in the 2015 Ghanaian Premier League season helping them to place 4th. In the process he made 17 league appearances and won 4 man of the match awards.

=== Asante Kotoko ===
In November 2015, he was signed by Kumasi-based club Asante Kotoko on a 3-year contract. After featuring in 18 league appearances in the 2016 Ghanaian Premier League, It was reported in the media in October 2016 that he had been placed on the transfer list of the club. He remained in the club for the following season only playing in 4 league matches for the 2017 Ghanaian Premier League season and being reportedly listed on the transfer list again at the end of the season.

=== Ashanti Gold ===
In August 2018, Asante Kotoko announced the departure of Agyemang and fellow player Isaac Quansah. With one season left on his contract, he signed a 3-year deal for Obuasi-based team Ashanti Gold. He was a member of the club's squad that featured in the 2020–21 CAF Confederation Cup. In August 2020, he signed a new 3-year contract with the club after the expiration of his initial 3-year contract.

== International career ==
Agyemang was part of the Black Meteors team, Ghana national under-23 football team that participated in 2015 All-Africa Games in Brazzaville, Congo.

== Honours ==
Calicut FC

- Super League Kerala: 2024
