= Jovel Martins =

Indian footballer

Personal information
- Date of birth: 15 August 1990 (age 36)
- Place of birth: Goa, India
- Height: 1.62 m (5 ft 4 in)
- Position: Left back

Team information
- Current team: Churchill Brothers
- Number: 37

Youth career
- Sporting Goa

Senior career*
Years	Team	Apps	(Gls)
2010–2017	Sporting Goa	60	(0)
2017	Goa	0	(0)
2018	→ Churchill Brothers (loan)	3	(0)
2018–	Churchill Brothers	23	(0)
- * Club domestic league appearances and goals as of 23:11, 18 February 2021 (UTC)

Jovel Martins (born 15 August 1990) is an Indian professional footballer who plays as a defender for Churchill Brothers in the I-League.

== Career ==
=== Sporting Clube de Goa ===
In June 2011 Martins signed for Sporting Clube de Goa who play in the I-League. He then made his debut for Sporting Goa on 23 October 2011 against Prayag United in the I-League.

== Career statistics ==
=== Club ===
As of 4 March 2022

Club	Season	League			Cup		AFC		Total	
Club	Season	Division	Apps	Goals	Apps	Goals	Apps	Goals	Apps	Goals
Sporting Goa	2011–12	I-League	16	0	0	0	–		16	0
Sporting Goa	2012-13	I-League	19	0	0	0	–		19	0
Sporting Goa	2013-14	I-League	13	0	0	0	–		15	0
Sporting Goa	2014–15	I-League	12	0	0	0	–		12	0
Goa	2017–18	Indian Super League	0	0	0	0	–		0	0
Churchill Brothers (loan)	2017–18	I-League	3	0	2 (Note: Appearances in the Super Cup)	0	–		5	0
Churchill Brothers	2018–19	I-League	10	0	0	0	–		10	0
Churchill Brothers	2019–20	I-League	12	0	0	0	–		12	0
Churchill Brothers	2020–21	I-League	1	0	0	0	–		1	0
Career total			86	0	2	0	0	0	88	0
