= Koushik Sarkar =

Indian footballer

Personal information
- Date of birth: 8 February 1994 (age 32)
- Place of birth: Chinsurah, West Bengal, India
- Position: Centre-back

Team information
- Current team: Kalighat MS

Youth career
- 2010–2015: Sports Authority of India

Senior career*
Years	Team	Apps	(Gls)
2013–2016	Kalighat MS		
2016–2019	East Bengal	4	(2)
2017	→ Kenkre (loan)		
2019–2020	Mohun Bagan		
2020–2021	Peerless		
2021–2022	Real Kashmir	8	(0)
2022–2023	Bhawanipore		
2023	Delhi		
2023–	Kalighat MS		

International career
2016	India U23		
2015–	India	2	(0)
- * Club domestic league appearances and goals

Koushik Sarkar (born 8 February 1994) is an Indian professional footballer who plays as a defender.

== Career ==
=== Early career ===
Born in Chinsurah, West Bengal, Sarkar joined the Sports Authority of India in 2010. He spent three seasons there before signing with the Calcutta Football League, Kalighat Milan Sangha. He made one appearance with them before returning to the Sports Authority of India.

Sarkar captained the University of Calcutta football side during the Inter-University challenge. While with the university side, Sarkar attracted interest through two good performances against I-League side, Mohun Bagan.

=== East Bengal ===
On 6 December 2015 it was announced that Sarkar had signed a three-year contract with East Bengal of the I-League. A year later, after not playing a single match for East Bengal in the I-League, it was revealed that Sarkar had his contract terminated by East Bengal before the 2016–17 season.

== International ==
Despite not playing professional football, Sarkar was called up to the shortlisted 40 player squad by India head coach, Stephen Constantine, in December 2015. On 27 December 2015, Sarkar made his debut for India in 2015 SAFF Championship match against Nepal, thus becoming the 503rd player to represent India internationally.

== Career statistics ==
As of 6 December 2015

Club	Season	League			League Cup		Domestic Cup		AFC		Total	
Club	Season	Division	Apps	Goals	Apps	Goals	Apps	Goals	Apps	Goals	Apps	Goals
East Bengal	2015–16	I-League	0	0	0	0	0	0	0	0	0	0
Career total			0	0	0	0	0	0	0	0	0	0

=== National team statistics ===
As of 27 December 2015

India national team
Year	Apps	Goals
2015	1	0
2016	1	0
Total	2	0

== Honours ==
India

- SAFF Championship: 2015

India U23

- South Asian Games Silver medal: 2016
