= Rohmingthanga Bawlte =

Indian footballer (born 1999)

Personal information
- Date of birth: 2 January 1999 (age 27)
- Place of birth: Lunglei, Mizoram, India
- Position: Winger

Team information
- Current team: Vasco SC
- Number: 11

Youth career
- Mohun Bagan Academy
- AIFF Elite Academy

Senior career*
Years	Team	Apps	(Gls)
2017–2019	Chennaiyin B	18	(4)
2019–2020	Indian Arrows	1	(0)
2020–2021	Aizawl FC	9	(1)
2021–2022	Real Kashmir	13	(0)
2022–2023	Rajasthan United	0	(0)
2023	United SC	0	(0)
2023-2024	Aizawl FC	9	(1)
2024	Kalighat Sports Lovers Association	-	(-)
2024-Present	Vasco SC		
- * Club domestic league appearances and goals as of 22:31, 03 December 2024 (IST)

Rohmingthanga Bawlte (born 2 January 1999) is an Indian professional footballer who plays as a forward for Goa Professional League club Vasco SC.

== Career ==
After graduating from AIFF Elite Academy Bawlte was signed by Chennaiyin B in October 2017. He was sent on loan to Indian Arrows in 2019-20 season. He made his professional debut for the Indian Arrows side in the Arrow's first match of the 2019–20 season against Aizawl F.C. He was brought in 87th minute as Indian Arrows lost 0–1.

=== Real Kashmir ===
In November 2021, Bawlte signed for the Snow Leopards ahead of the 2021–22 season. On 27 December, he made his debut against his former club Aizawl, which ended in a thrilling 3–2 win. He came on as a 90th-minute substitute for Tiago Adan.

=== Rajasthan United ===
In August 2022, I-League club Rajasthan United roped in Bawlte.

== Career statistics ==
=== Club ===
As of 4 May 2022

Club	Season	League			Cup		AFC		Total	
Club	Season	Division	Apps	Goals	Apps	Goals	Apps	Goals	Apps	Goals
Chennaiyin B	2017–18	I-League 2nd Division	10	1	0	0	—		10	1
Chennaiyin B	2018–19	I-League 2nd Division	8	3	0	0	—		8	3
Chennaiyin B	Chennaiyin B total		18	4	0	0	0	0	18	4
Chennaiyin	2019–20	Indian Super League	0	0	3 (Note: Appearance(s) in Durand Cup)	0	—		3	0
Indian Arrows	2019–20	I-League	1	0	0	0	—		1	0
Aizawl	2020–21	I-League	9	1	0	0	—		9	1
Real Kashmir	2021–22	I-League	13	0	0	0	—		13	0
Rajasthan United	2022–23	I-League	0	0	0	0	—		0	0
Career total			41	5	3	0	0	0	44	5

== Honours ==
Rajasthan United

- Baji Rout Cup: 2022
