= Pratesh Shirodkar =

Indian footballer (born 1989)

Personal information
- Full name: Pratesh Shirodkar
- Date of birth: 19 February 1989 (age 37)
- Place of birth: Calangute, Goa
- Height: 1.68 m (5 ft 6 in)
- Position: Midfielder

Team information
- Current team: Real Kashmir
- Number: 55

Youth career
- SESA FA

Senior career*
Years	Team	Apps	(Gls)
2012–2016	Sporting Goa	73	(5)
2015	→ Mumbai City (loan)	7	(0)
2016–2019	Goa	6	(0)
2017	→ Mumbai (loan)	13	(0)
2020–	Real Kashmir	31	(0)
- * Club domestic league appearances and goals as of 23:33, 4 May 2022 (UTC)

Pratesh Shirodkar (born 19 February 1989), is an Indian footballer who plays as a midfielder for Real Kashmir in the I-League.

== Career ==
=== Sporting Goa ===
After spending his youth career with SESA Football Academy in Goa Pratesh signed for Sporting Clube de Goa of the I-League on 29 June 2012. Pratesh scored his first goal for the club on 28 August 2012 against ONGC in the 2012 Durand Cup.

=== Mumbai City ===
In July 2015 Shirodkar was drafted to play for Mumbai City FC in the 2015 Indian Super League.

=== Goa ===
After playing the 2015 Indian Super League with Mumbai City, Shirodkar signed with his home state side, Goa, for the 2016 season.

== Career statistics ==
=== Club ===
As of 4 May 2022

Club	Season	League			Cup		AFC		Total	
Club	Season	Division	Apps	Goals	Apps	Goals	Apps	Goals	Apps	Goals
Sporting Goa	2012–13	I-League	24	1	1 (Note: Appearance(s) in Durand Cup)	1	—		25	2
Sporting Goa	2013–14	I-League	20	2	4 (Note: Appearance(s) in Federation Cup)	0	—		24	2
Sporting Goa	2014–15	I-League	18	1	0	0	—		18	1
Mumbai City (loan)	2015	Indian Super League	7	0	0	0	—		7	0
Sporting Goa	2015–16	I-League	11	1	0	0	—		11	1
Goa	2016	Indian Super League	3	0	0	0	—		3	0
Mumbai (loan)	2016–17	I-League	13	0	0	0	—		13	0
Goa	2017–18	Indian Super League	2	0	2 (Note: Appearance(s) in Super Cup)	0	—		4	0
Goa	2018–19	Indian Super League	1	0	0	0	—		1	0
Goa	2019–20	Indian Super League	0	0	0	0	—		0	0
Real Kashmir	2020–21	I-League	15	0	0	0	—		15	0
Real Kashmir	2021–22	I-League	16	0	0	0	—		16	0
Career total			130	5	7	1	0	0	137	6

== Honours ==
FC Goa

- Indian Super Cup: 2019

Real Kashmir

- IFA Shield: 2020, 2021
