= Tiago Adan =

Brazilian footballer

Personal information
- Full name: Tiago Adan Fonseca
- Date of birth: 14 March 1988 (age 38)
- Place of birth: Votorantim, Brazil
- Height: 1.88 m (6 ft 2 in)
- Position: Striker

Team information
- Current team: Marsaxlokk
- Number: 99

Youth career
- 2005: Atlético Sorocaba-SP
- 2006–2007: Corinthians

Senior career*
| Years | Team | Apps | (Gls) |
| 2008 | Náutico | 3 | (0) |
| 2009 | Caxias | 1 | (0) |
| 2010–2011 | Astra Giurgiu | 33 | (11) |
| 2012 | Arapongas | 18 | (10) |
| 2012–2017 | Atlético Paranaense | 16 | (2) |
| 2013 | → América de Natal (loan) | 11 | (1) |
| 2015 | → Ferroviária (loan) | 18 | (8) |
| 2015 | → Criciúma (loan) | 11 | (2) |
| 2016 | → Ferroviária (loan) | 7 | (1) |
| 2016 | → Náutico (loan) | 15 | (1) |
| 2017 | → Oeste (loan) | 16 | (2) |
| 2017 | Vila Nova | 22 | (0) |
| 2018 | Novorizontino | 5 | (0) |
| 2018–2019 | Hibernians | 26 | (11) |
| 2019–2021 | Floriana | 30 | (10) |
| 2021 | → Hibernians (loan) | 7 | (2) |
| 2021 | Retrô | 8 | (2) |
| 2021–2022 | Real Kashmir | 10 | (7) |
| 2022– | Marsaxlokk | 23 | (4) |
- * Club domestic league appearances and goals as of 25 June 2023

Tiago Adan Fonseca (born 14 March 1988), simply known as Tiago Adan, is a Brazilian professional footballer who plays as a forward for Marsaxlokk in the Maltese Premier League.

== Club career ==
=== Real Kashmir ===
On 26 October 2021, Adan signed for the Snow Leopards on a season-long deal.

On 27 December 2021, he made his debut for the club in the I-League, against Aizawl in a 3–2 win, in which he scored a brace.

=== Marsaxlokk ===
In June 2022, newly promoted Maltese Premier League club Marsaxlokk secured the services of Adan, on a one-year deal.

== Honours ==
Real Kashmir

- IFA Shield: 2021
