= 2023 Indian Super League final =

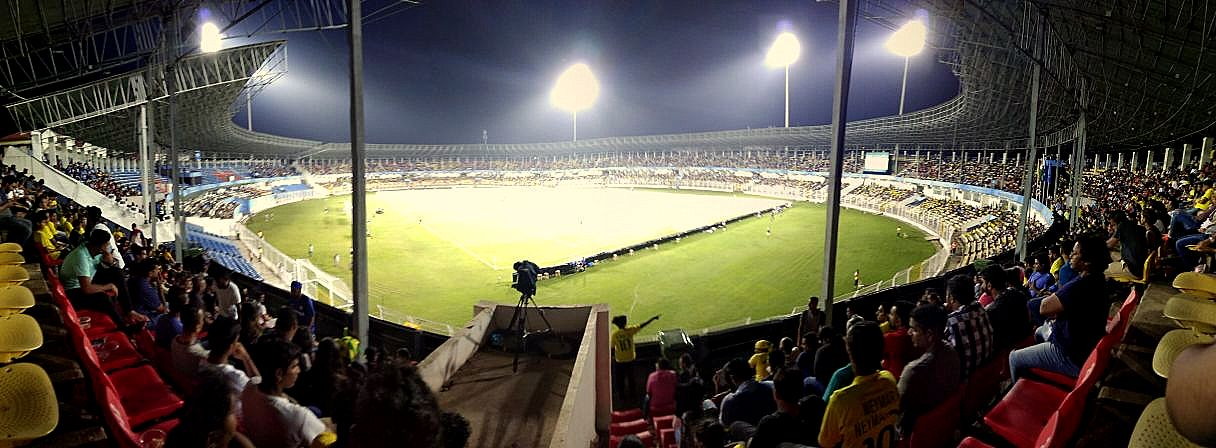
- Fatorda Stadium in Margao hosted the match.
- Event: 2022–23 Indian Super League
ATK Mohun Bagan	Bengaluru
2	2
- ATK Mohun Bagan won 4–3 on penalties
- Date: 18 March 2023
- Venue: Fatorda Stadium, Margao
- Hero of the Match: Dimitri Petratos
- Referee: Harish Kundu
- Attendance: 11,879

The 2023 Indian Super League Cup final was the final match of the 2023 ISL Cup playoffs. It was played on 18 March 2023 between ATK Mohun Bagan and Bengaluru at the Fatorda Stadium in Margao.

ATK Mohun Bagan played their second final and Bengaluru played their third final. The match ended 2–2 after extra time, with ATK Mohun Bagan winning 4–3 on penalties to secure their first Indian Super League title.

The playoff champions, ATK Mohun Bagan, thus qualified for Indian playoffs for 2023–24 AFC competitions against Hyderabad, the champions of 2021–22 Indian Super League for a place in 2023–24 AFC Cup qualifying playoff round.

== Background ==
ATK Mohun Bagan finished third in the regular season table and won 2–0 in the playoff knockout against Odisha. They then went on to win 0–0 aggregate via penalties (4–3) against league runners-up and defending champions Hyderabad in the playoff semi-final to qualify for the final.

Bengaluru finished fourth in the regular season table and won 1–0 in the playoff knockout against Kerala Blasters. They then went on to win 2–2 aggregate via penalties (9–8) against table toppers Mumbai City in the playoff semi-final to qualify for the final.

== Match ==
18 March 2023
19:30 IST

ATK Mohun Bagan	2–2 (a.e.t.)	Bengaluru
D. Petratos 14' (pen.), 85' (pen.)	Report	Chhetri 45+4' (pen.); Krishna 78'
Penalties
D. Petratos (penalty scored); Liston (penalty scored); Kiyan (penalty scored); Manvir (penalty scored)	4–3	(penalty scored) Alan Costa; (penalty scored) Krishna; (penalty missed) B. Ramires; (penalty scored) Chhetri; (penalty missed) Pérez

Fatorda Stadium, Margao
Attendance: 11,879
Referee: Harish Kundu

ATK Mohun Bagan	Bengaluru

GK	1	(India) Vishal Kaith
DF	44	(India) Asish Rai
DF	20	(India) Pritam Kotal (c)
DF	3	(Montenegro) Slavko Damjanović
DF	15	(India) Subhasish Bose		(substituted off) 83'
MF	8	(Republic of Ireland) Carl McHugh	(yellow card) 68'	(substituted off) 83'
MF	33	(India) Glan Martins		(substituted off) 46'
MF	10	(France) Hugo Boumous		(substituted off) 86'
MF	19	(India) Ashique Kuruniyan		(substituted off) 54'
FW	11	(India) Manvir Singh
FW	9	(Australia) Dimitri Petratos
Substitutes:
GK	31	(India) Arsh Shaikh
DF	2	(India) Sumit Rathi		(substituted on) 108'
MF	5	(Australia) Brendan Hamill		(substituted on) 86'	(substituted off) 108'
MF	32	(India) Lalthathanga Khawlhring
MF	14	(India) Lalrinliana Hnamte	(yellow card) 90+1'	(substituted on) 46'
MF	21	(Uruguay) Federico Gallego		(substituted on) 83'
FW	17	(India) Liston Colaco		(substituted on) 54'
FW	25	(India) Kiyan Giri		(substituted on) 83'
FW	27	(India) Md. Fardin Ali Molla
Head coach:
(Spain) Juan Ferrando

GK	1	(India) Gurpreet Singh Sandhu
DF	4	(Australia) Aleksandar Jovanovic		(substituted off) 46'
DF	3	(India) Sandesh Jhingan
DF	33	(India) Prabir Das	(yellow card) 30'
MF	32	(India) Roshan Naorem	(yellow card) 37'	(substituted off) 109'
MF	6	(Brazil) Bruno Silva
MF	8	(India) Suresh Wangjam
MF	10	(Spain) Javier Hernandez		(substituted off) 91'
MF	18	(India) Rohit Kumar		(substituted off) 102'
FW	22	(Fiji) Roy Krishna
FW	39	(India) Sivasakthi Narayanan		(substituted off) 4'
Substitutes:
GK	1	(India) Amrit Gope
DF	2	(India) Parag Shrivas		(substituted on) 109'
DF	5	(Brazil) Alan Costa		(substituted on) 102'
DF	25	(India) Namgyal Bhutia
MF	7	(India) Jayesh Rane
MF	23	(Spain) Pablo Pérez	(yellow card) 118'	(substituted on) 46'
MF	31	(India) Leon Augustine
FW	11	(India) Sunil Chhetri	(yellow card) 37'	(substituted on) 4'
FW	21	(India) Udanta Singh		(substituted on) 91'
Head coach:
(England) Simon Grayson

Hero of the Match

- Dimitri Petratos (ATK Mohun Bagan)

Match rules

- 90 minutes.
- 30 minutes of extra time if necessary.
- Penalty shoot-out if scores still level.
- Nine named substitutes.
- Maximum of five substitutions. One additional substitution in extra time.
