= 2022 Durand Cup final =

- Event: 2022 Durand Cup
Mumbai City	Bengaluru
1	2
- Date: 18 September 2022
- Venue: Vivekananda Yuba Bharati Krirangan, Kolkata
- Man of the Match: (Brazil) Bruno Ramires (Bengaluru)
- Referee: C. R. Srikrishna (India)
- Attendance: Unavailable
- Weather: Partly clear evening 28 °C (82 °F); 94% humidity

The 2022 Durand Cup final, also called IndianOil Durand Cup Final due to sponsorship ties with Indian Oil Corporation, was the final match of the 2022 Durand Cup, the 131st edition of Asia's oldest football tournament, jointly organised by the Eastern Command and the Government of West Bengal, in cooperation with the Government of Assam and the Government of Manipur. It was played at Vivekananda Yuba Bharati Krirangan in Kolkata, West Bengal on 18 September 2022.

== Route to the final ==
Note: In all results below, the score of the finalist is given first.

Mumbai City		Round	Bengaluru	
Opponent	Result	Group stage	Opponent	Result
Indian Navy	4–1	Matchday 1	Jamshedpur	2–1
ATK Mohun Bagan	1–1	Matchday 2	Indian Air Force	4–0
Rajasthan United	5–1	Matchday 3	Goa	2–2
East Bengal	3–4	Matchday 4	Mohammedan	1–1
Group B winner: Pos / Team / Pld / Pts; 1 / Mumbai City / 4 / 7; 2 / Rajasthan United / 4 / 7; 3 / Mohun Bagan (H) / 4 / 7; 4 / East Bengal (H) / 4 / 5; 5 / Indian Navy / 4 / 1; Source: Sportstar (H) Hosts		Final standings	Group A runner-up: Pos / Team / Pld / Pts; 1 / Mohammedan (H) / 4 / 10; 2 / Bengaluru / 4 / 8; 3 / Jamshedpur / 4 / 6; 4 / Goa / 4 / 4; 5 / Indian Air Force / 4 / 0; Source: Sportstar (H) Hosts	
Opponent	Result	Knockout stage	Opponent	Result
Chennaiyin	5–3 (a.e.t.)	Quarter-finals	Odisha	2–1 (a.e.t.)
Mohammedan	1–0	Semi-finals	Hyderabad	1–0

== Pre-match ==
=== Ticketing ===
The tickets for the final were made available both online as well as offline. The online tickets were released on BookMyShow.com on 10 September and was open until the day before the final. The offline tickets were made available from a day prior to the matchday at the VYBK box offices and the Mohammedan club tent. Metro Railway Kolkata also collaborated with the tournament organisers to sell tickets at the ticket counters of the Park Street metro station and the Salt Lake Stadium metro station. Complimentary tickets were distributed among the fans by two Maidan clubs—Mohun Bagan and Mohammedan.

=== Final ceremony ===
The closing ceremony on the final day of the tournament involved performances by Indian military bands playing patriotic songs including the National song– Vande Mataram. Other acts consisted of performances by Air Warrior Drill Team, various folk dance performances and Kalaripayattu acts.

=== Guests ===
The guest of honour for the final was the Governor of Manipur and West Bengal– La. Ganesan Iyer, who was accompanied by other eminent figures like the Cabinet Minister for Sports and Youth Affairs (Government of West Bengal)– Aroop Biswas, the Minister of State for Sports and Youth Affairs (Government of West Bengal)– Manoj Tiwary, the Chief of Army Staff– Gen. Manoj Pande, the Chief of Staff (Eastern Command)– Lt. Gen. Kamal Kumar Repswal and the General Officer Commanding-in-Chief (Eastern Command)– Lt. Gen. Rana Pratap Kalita. The match was also attended by various key representatives of the tournament sponsors and partners.

== Match ==
=== Summary ===
Bengaluru took an early lead through the fifth tournament goal from Sivasakthi Narayanan in the 10th minute that was converted from a long ball delivered from the deep by Aleksandar Jovanovic, which put the Mumbai City's captain Mourtada Fall under pressure with Narayanan on his shoulder. After Lallianzuala Chhangte had the first chance for Mumbai City in the 17th minute, they got the equalizer at the half-hour mark when Sandesh Jhingan gave away a free kick and Ahmed Jahouh played on Greg Stewart, who went on one of his runs and took a left-footed grounder towards goal which Gurpreet Singh Sandhu fended off, but Apuia tapped home the rebound with ease. The Blues almost went ahead in the 38th minute, when, off Roshan Singh's corner, a rebound fell for Roy Krishna and he shot towards goal, but Chhangte brought off a stunning goal-line save. The Islanders' next closest chance for a lead came from Vinit Rai after being played on by Stewart but shot over from close. The only other notable incident of the first half was the match's first yellow card that turned up for Fall in the 44th minute after he elbowed down Krishna near the penalty box.

The game resumed for the second half with a similar intensity and only five minutes after resumption, Jahouh delivered a measured long ball that fell for Chhangte, who got away from Jovanovic and Jhingan, but with just the keeper to beat, the shot went wide out. At the hour mark, the Blues earned the long-awaited lead in the game, when off the captain Sunil Chhetri's corner aimed at the far post, Alan Costa jumped and nailed a header into the back of the Islanders' net. The most notable chance for Mumbai City in the second half came through Alberto Noguera in the 77th minute when he went on a solo run from midfield and took a powerful shot which beat Gurpreet but struck the left post to deflect away. Chhetri also had a couple of scoring opportunities, including one in the 69th minute when his left-footed strike missed the target and one in the 87th minute when he was one-on-one with the keeper, but Phurba Lachenpa was up to it and brought off a brave save. With six minutes of time added on, Mumbai City made constant efforts for an equaliser and Stewart came close to score in the final seconds with a free kick which ultimately went wide, and the final culminated with Bengaluru winning their first-ever Durand Cup.

=== Details ===
18 September 2022
18.00 IST

Mumbai City	1–2	Bengaluru
Apuia 30'	Report	Narayanan 10'; Costa 61'

Vivekananda Yuba Bharati Krirangan, Kolkata
Referee: C R Srikrishna

Mumbai City	Bengaluru

GK	1	(India) Phurba Lachenpa
DF	15	(India) Sanjeev Stalin
DF	25	(Senegal) Mourtada Fall (c)	(yellow card) 44'	(substituted off) 66'
DF	18	(Australia) Rostyn Griffiths
DF	17	(India) Mandar Rao Desai		(substituted off) 88'
MF	45	(India) Apuia		(substituted off) 74'
MF	10	(Morocco) Ahmed Jahouh	(yellow card) 87'
MF	16	(India) Vinit Rai		(substituted off) 66'
FW	7	(India) Lallianzuala Chhangte
FW	24	(Scotland) Greg Stewart
FW	29	(India) Bipin Singh
Substitutes:
GK	22	(India) Bhaskar Roy
DF	5	(India) Mehtab Singh		(substituted on) 66'
DF	33	(India) Gursimrat Singh Gill
DF	23	(India) Vignesh Dakshinamurthy
MF	14	(India) Rowllin Borges
MF	36	(India) Mohammed Asif Khan
MF	8	(Spain) Alberto Noguera		(substituted on) 66'
FW	6	(India) Vikram Partap Singh		(substituted on) 88'
FW	9	(India) Gurkirat Singh		(substituted on) 74'
FW	28	(India) Ayush Chhikara
Head coach:
(England) Des Buckingham

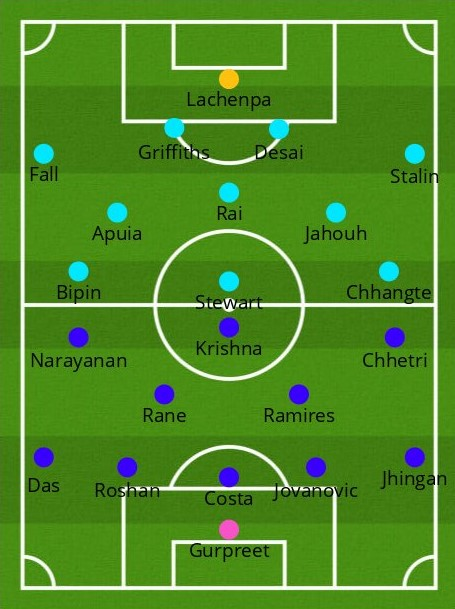

GK	1	(India) Gurpreet Singh Sandhu
DF	33	(India) Prabir Das		(substituted off) 80'
DF	5	(Brazil) Alan Costa		(substituted off) 64'
DF	3	(India) Sandesh Jhingan	(yellow card) 57'
DF	4	(Australia) Aleksandar Jovanovic
DF	32	(India) Roshan Singh		(substituted off) 80'
MF	6	(Brazil) Bruno Ramires	(yellow card) 90+5'
MF	7	(India) Jayesh Rane		(substituted off) 80'
FW	11	(India) Sunil Chhetri (c)
FW	22	(Fiji) Roy Krishna
FW	39	(India) Sivasakthi Narayanan		(substituted off) 89'
Substitutes:
GK	30	(India) Lara Sharma
DF	3	(India) Parag Shrivas		(substituted on) 64'
DF	25	(India) Namgyal Bhutia		(substituted on) 89'
DF	24	(India) Hira Mondal		(substituted on) 80'
DF	15	(India) Wungngayam Muirang
MF	12	(India) Danish Bhat
MF	18	(India) Rohit Kumar		(substituted on) 80'
FW	21	(India) Udanta Singh		(substituted on) 80'
FW	31	(India) Leon Augustine
FW	19	(India) Faisal Ali
Head coach:
(England) Simon Grayson

Man of the Match:
Bruno Ramires (Bengaluru)

Assistant referees:
Kennedy Sapam (India)
B Nagoorkani (India)
Fourth official:
Aditya Purkayastha (India)

Match rules

- 90 minutes.
- 30 minutes of extra time if necessary.
- Penalty shoot-out if scores are still level.
- Maximum of ten named substitutes.
- Maximum of five substitutions allowed.

=== Statistics ===
At half time
Statistic	Mumbai City	Bengaluru
Goals scored	1	1
Total shots	6	7
Shots on target	2	2
Ball possession	59%	41%
Corner kicks	0	2
Yellow cards	1	0
Red cards	0	0

At full time
Statistic	Mumbai City	Bengaluru
Goals scored	1	2
Total shots	16	12
Shots on target	3	5
Ball possession	59%	41%
Corner kicks	1	6
Yellow cards	2	2
Red cards	0	0

== Post-match ==
With their win, Bengaluru became the first ISL club to win every major championship final—ISL playoffs, Super Cup (previously Federation Cup) and Durand Cup. Bengaluru captain Sunil Chhetri also secured his only remaining major national title to have participated for with this victory. Mumbai City forward Lallianzuala Chhangte won the Golden Boot after finishing the season with 7 goals in 7 matches and Antonio Dylan of Odisha bagged the Golden Glove for 2 clean sheets in 2 games. Mumbai City midfielder Greg Stewart earned the Golden Ball as the most valuable player in the tournament.

=== Controversy involving La. Ganesan and Aroop Biswas ===
During the handing over of the Shimla Trophy by Lt. Gen. Rana Pratap Kalita and Aroop Biswas to Roy Krishna and Sivasakthi Narayanan, Biswas was seen pushing away Narayanan, who might have been blocking him in the photos. Later during the handing over of the President's Cup by Biswas and La. Ganesan to Simon Grayson and Sunil Chhetri, Ganesan would push away Chhetri for the same reason. The video of the incidents would go viral later that night after many people felt annoyed, especially with the Governor's actions towards Chhetri, who is revered by huge numbers of people across the nation. Many people tweeted demanding for public apologies from the Governor and the Minister for their disrespectful actions towards the footballers.
