= 2023 Indian Super League playoffs =

2022–23 ISL Cup playoffs
Tournament details
- Country: India
- Teams: 6

Final positions
- Champions: ATK Mohun Bagan
- Runners-up: Bengaluru
- Semifinalists: Mumbai City; Hyderabad

Tournament statistics
- Matches played: 7
- Goals scored: 9 (1.29 per match)

The 2023 Indian Super League Cup playoffs was the post-season knockout tournament of the 2022–23 Indian Super League to determine the ISL Cup winners. It was the 9th edition of the Indian Super League playoffs. The playoffs began on 29 March 2025 and concluded with the ISL Cup final on 18 March 2025.

The top two teams in regular season, Mumbai City and Hyderabad automatically qualified for the semi-finals. Teams finishing 3rd to 6th featured in a single-leg play-off to determine the other two semi-finalists, with ATK Mohun Bagan and Bengaluru advancing. The semi-finals took place over two legs while the final was a one-off match at the Fatorda Stadium in Margao, with ATK Mohun Bagan beating Bengaluru on penalties.

== Season table ==
Pos	Team	Pld	W	D	L	GF	GA	GD	Pts	Qualification
1	Mumbai City (C)	20	14	4	2	54	21	+33	46	ISL Cup Semi-finals, Playoffs for 2023–24 ACL group stage and 2023–24 ACL group stage (Note: Qualified via winning the Indian club qualifiers for 2023–24 AFC competitions) (Note: It was announced by AIFF that 2022-23 will be the last season in which the defending Cup Winners will wear the Champions badge. Starting from 2023-24 season it will be the defending League Shield Winners that will wear the Champions badge hereafter.)
2	Hyderabad	20	13	3	4	36	16	+20	42	ISL Cup Semi-finals
3	ATK Mohun Bagan (W)	20	10	4	6	24	17	+7	34 (Note: Head-to-head points: ATK Mohun Bagan 3, Bengaluru 3. Head-to-head goal difference: ATK Mohun Bagan 0, Bengaluru 0. Head-to-head goal scored: ATK Mohun Bagan 4, Bengaluru 4. Goal difference: ATK Mohun Bagan +7, Bengaluru +4.)	ISL Cup Knockouts, Playoffs for 2023–24 AFC Cup qualifiers (Note: Qualified via winning the 2023 Indian Super League playoffs) and 2023–24 AFC Cup qualifiers (Note: Qualified via winning the Indian club qualifiers for 2023–24 AFC competitions) (Note: It was announced by AIFF that 2022-23 will be the last season in which the reigning Cup Winners will wear the Champions badge. Starting from 2023-24 season it will be the reigning League Shield Winners that will wear the Champions badge thereafter.)
4	Bengaluru	20	11	1	8	27	23	+4	34	ISL Cup Knockouts
5	Kerala Blasters	20	10	1	9	28	28	0	31	ISL Cup Knockouts
6	Odisha	20	9	3	8	30	32	−2	30	ISL Cup Knockouts, Playoffs for 2023–24 AFC Cup group stage (Note: Qualified via winning the 2023 Super Cup) and 2023–24 AFC Cup group stage (Note: Qualified via winning the Indian club qualifiers for 2023–24 AFC competitions)
7	Goa	20	8	3	9	36	35	+1	27 (Note: Head-to-head points: Goa 3, Chennaiyin 3. Head-to-head goal difference: Goa +1, Chennaiyin -1.)	
8	Chennaiyin	20	7	6	7	36	37	−1	27	
9	East Bengal	20	6	1	13	22	38	−16	19 (Note: Head-to-head points: East Bengal 3, Jamshedpur 3. Head-to-head goal difference: East Bengal +1, Jamshedpur -1.)	
10	Jamshedpur	20	5	4	11	21	32	−11	19	
11	NorthEast United	20	1	2	17	20	55	−35	5	

Source: Indian Super League
Rules for classification: 1) points; 2) head-to-head points; 3) head-to-head goal difference; 4) head-to-head goals scored; 5) goal difference; 6) number of goals scored; 7) fair play ranking; 8) drawing of lots
(C) Champions; (W) ISL Cup winners

== Teams ==
- Mumbai City
- Hyderabad
- Bengaluru
- ATK Mohun Bagan
- Kerala Blasters
- Odisha

== Bracket ==
Knockout
4	Bengaluru (a.e.t.)	1
5	Kerala Blasters	0
3	ATK Mohun Bagan	2
6	Odisha	0

Semifinals
1	Mumbai City	0	2	2 (8)
4	Bengaluru (p)	1	1	2 (9)
2	Hyderabad	0	0	0 (3)
3	ATK Mohun Bagan (p)	0	0	0 (4)

Finals
4	Bengaluru	2 (3)
3	ATK Mohun Bagan (p)	2 (4)

=== Knockout ===
Team 1	Score	Team 2
Bengaluru	1–0 (a.e.t.)	Kerala Blasters
ATK Mohun Bagan	2–0	Odisha

=== Semi-finals ===
Team 1	Agg.	Team 2	1st leg	2nd leg
Mumbai City	2–2 (8–9 p)	Bengaluru	0–1	2–1 (a.e.t.)
Hyderabad	0–0 (4–3 p)	ATK Mohun Bagan	0–0	0–0 (a.e.t.)

== Knockout ==
3 March 2023
19:30 IST

Bengaluru	1–0 (a.e.t.)	Kerala Blasters
Chhetri 96'	Report

Sree Kanteerava Stadium, Bengaluru
Attendance: 20,301
Referee: Crystal John

4 March 2023
19:30 IST

ATK Mohun Bagan	2–0	Odisha
Boumous 36'; D. Petratos 58'	Report

Vivekananda Yuba Bharati Krirangan, Kolkata
Attendance: 35,256
Referee: Rahul Kumar Gupta

== Semi-finals ==
7 March 2023
19:30 IST

Mumbai City	0–1	Bengaluru
	Report	Chhetri 79'

Mumbai Football Arena, Mumbai
Attendance: 6,124
Referee: R Venkatesh
12 March 2023
19:30 IST

Bengaluru	1–2 (a.e.t.)	Mumbai City
Javi H. 22'	Report	Bipin 31'; Mehtab 66'
Penalties
Javi H. (penalty scored); Krishna (penalty scored); Alan Costa (penalty scored); Chhetri (penalty scored); Pérez (penalty scored); Prabir (penalty scored); Rohit (penalty scored); Suresh (penalty scored); Jhingan (penalty scored)	9–8	(penalty scored) Stewart; (penalty scored) Pereyra Díaz; (penalty scored) LZ Chhangte; (penalty scored) F. A. H. Jahouh; (penalty scored) Rahul; (penalty scored) Vikram; (penalty scored) M. Fall; (penalty scored) Vinit R; (penalty missed) Mehtab

Sree Kanteerava Stadium, Bengaluru
Attendance: 21,901
Referee: Rahul Kumar Gupta

2–2 on aggregate. Bengaluru won 9–8 on penalties.

9 March 2023
19:30 IST

Hyderabad	0–0	ATK Mohun Bagan
	Report

G. M. C. Balayogi Athletic Stadium, Hyderabad
Attendance: 12,926
Referee: Harish Kundu
13 March 2023
19:30 IST

ATK Mohun Bagan	0–0 (a.e.t.)	Hyderabad
	Report
Penalties
D. Petratos (penalty scored); F. Gallego (penalty scored); Manvir (penalty scored); Hamill (penalty missed); Pritam (penalty scored)	4–3	(penalty scored) João MJT; (penalty missed) Siverio; (penalty missed) Ogbeche; (penalty scored) Danu; (penalty scored) Reagan

Vivekananda Yuba Bharati Krirangan, Kolkata
Attendance: 52,507
Referee: Coimbatore Ramaswamy Srikrishna

0–0 on aggregate. ATK Mohun Bagan won 4–3 on penalties.

== Final ==
18 March 2023
19:30 IST

ATK Mohun Bagan	2–2 (a.e.t.)	Bengaluru
D. Petratos 14' (pen.), 85' (pen.)	Report	Chhetri 45+4' (pen.); Krishna 78'
Penalties
D. Petratos (penalty scored); Liston (penalty scored); Kiyan (penalty scored); Manvir (penalty scored)	4–3	(penalty scored) Alan Costa; (penalty scored) Krishna; (penalty missed) B. Ramires; (penalty scored) Chhetri; (penalty missed) Pérez

Fatorda Stadium, Margao
Attendance: 11,879
Referee: Harish Kundu

== Controversy ==
The first knockout match of the playoffs between Bengaluru and Kerala Blasters had a controversial ending. Kerala Blasters players were called off the pitch by head coach Ivan Vukomanović in protest after a controversial free-kick goal was awarded to Bengaluru in the seventh minute of extra time, scored by Sunil Chhetri. Kerala Blasters forfeited the match in disagreement with the decision and a win was awarded to Bengaluru.
