= 2022–23 Bengaluru FC season =

10th season in the existence of Bengaluru FC

Bengaluru FC
2022–23 season
- Sun sets behind Kanteerava as Bengaluru FC vs Jamshedpur FC match progresses, 17 December 2022.
- Chairman: (India) Parth Jindal
- Manager: (England) Simon Grayson
- Stadium: Sree Kanteerava Stadium
- Indian Super League: Runners-up (league 4th)
- Super Cup: Runners-up
- Durand Cup: Champions (first title)
- Top goalscorer: League: (India) Sivasakthi Narayanan (Spain) Javi Hernandez (6 goals each); All: (India) Sivasakthi Narayanan (11 goals)
- Highest home attendance: 28,001
- Average home league attendance: 11,371
- Biggest win: 4–0 (vs Indian Air Force)
- Biggest defeat: 0–4 (vs Mumbai City)
Home colours	Away colours	Third colours
- All statistics correct as of 10 March 2022.

The 2022–23 season is Bengaluru FC's tenth season as a club since its establishment in 2013. After spending two seasons in Goa, at a centralised venue due to COVID-19 pandemic, the club will return to Sree Kanteerava Stadium, despite the concerns raised by the athletes. This season also marks as the final season leading to the decennial anniversary of the club on 20 July 2023.

Bengaluru's season commenced with the 2022 edition of Durand Cup, which also acts as a curtain raiser for the domestic season. The 2022–23 season of Indian Super League will see the blues returning to the Sree Kanteerava Stadium after three years despite the concerns raised by the athletes. With the Super Cup returning after three years, the inaugural edition's champions will also participate in the tournament which is set to be held in 2023 after the league ends.

== Background ==
In the previous season, the rebuilt Bengaluru FC squad led by Marco Pezzaiuoli finished sixth in the Indian Super League, it was the club's second worst finish in the league after ending up in the seventh spot in 2020–21 season. Before the league, Bengaluru FC made their fifth appearance in the 2021 season of AFC Cup where they failed to make it past the group stage after finishing third behind ATK Mohun Bagan and Bashundhara Kings with four points. Later, in the 2021 edition of Durand Cup, Bengaluru fielded their reserve squad with the assistant head coach Naushad Moosa leading the young team. The team's unbeaten run of four games was halted by FC Goa in the second semifinal, where they went down by a 7–6 margin on penalties.

After failing to qualify for the playoffs in two consecutive seasons, Bengaluru began to make changes in the squad with the likes of defenders Pratik Chaudhari and Sarthak Golui parting ways with the club along with the foreigners Iman Basafa, Cleiton Silva and the head coach Marco Pezzaiuoli who was on the performance-based contract. On 8 June, Bengaluru appointed former Fleetwood Town coach, Simon Grayson as their new head coach on a two-year contract.

When I spoke to the owner (Parth Jindal), his mindset was the same as mine. I want this club to be winning trophies again. I know that BFC has been very successful in the past, but the last few years haven't worked out like everybody would have liked it to. That happens in football – you learn from it and strive to do better – to get players to work harder on and off the pitch; that's the exciting part for me.

— Simon Grayson, after completing formalities of the deal, Bengaluru FC

Following the head coach's appointment, Bengaluru then handed over contract extensions for Roshan Singh, Lara Sharma and Wungngayam Muirang on two-years each and a three-year deal respectively. Later, on 20 June, Ashique Kuruniyan who had served the club for three seasons moved to ATK Mohun Bagan while Prabir Das from the same club was announced as a new right wingback addition. Two days later, the club strengthened their midfield by signing Spanish international Javi Hernández on a two-year deal. The management further extended the contracts of Parag Shrivas, Leon Augustine and Namgyal Bhutia.

Come July and Bengaluru would make a double deal with the likes of the 22-year-olds from I-League sides, Amrit Gope the former TRAU goalkeeper signed a two-year deal, and Faisal Ali the former Mohamemedan winger penned a deal that ends in 2025. A tragedy shook the Indian football fraternity on 4 July after Adrian Luna, the Kerala Blasters player, disclosed the passing of his six-year-old daughter to whom many players and clubs including Bengaluru FC paid condolences to. On 5 July, Bengaluru filled the void created by the departure of left-back Ajith Kumar by signing Hira Mondal from East Bengal. On 15 July, Yrondu Musavu-King, the Gabonese center-back parted ways with the club after serving for one season. Three days later, Bengaluru made their biggest signing of the season after they closed the deal with the Fijian star striker Roy Krishna who had previously won the Indian Super League Golden Ball in 2020–21 season

20 July 2022 marked the ninth anniversary of Bengaluru FC's foundation. The CEO of the club, Mandar Tamhane, tweeted in celebration of the foundation day, along with the former Bengaluru FC players Darren Caldeira, Cameron Watson and the reserve team head coach Naushad Moosa. On 22 July, Bengaluru completed their Asian slot by signing the six-foot five-inch tall center-back Aleksander Jovanovic from Australia. A day later, the club made four new domestic signings by bringing in the two local talents Sudheer Kotikela and Ankith Padmanabhan from the Karnataka state team along with the two young Goan players, Felixson Fernandes and Clarence Fernandes. They had been scouted from the JSW Youth Cup held a few months earlier in April.

=== Transfers in ===
No.	Position	Player	Previous club	Date	Fee	Ref
33	DF	(India) Prabir Das	ATK Mohun Bagan	20 June 2022	Undisclosed	
18	MF	(Spain) Javi Hernández	Odisha	22 June 2022	Free transfer	
23	FW	(India) Faisal Ali	Mohammedan	1 July 2022	Free transfer	
50	GK	(India) Amrit Gope	TRAU	1 July 2022	Free transfer	
20	DF	(India) Hira Mondal	East Bengal	5 July 2022	Free transfer	
22	FW	(Fiji) Roy Krishna	ATK Mohun Bagan	18 July 2022	Free transfer	
2	DF	(Australia) (Serbia) Aleksander Jovanovic	(Australia) Macarthur FC	22 July 2022	Free transfer	
24	FW	(India) Sudheer Kotikala	Kickstart FC	23 July 2022	Free transfer	
	FW	(India) Ankith Padmanabhan	Kickstart FC	23 July 2022	Free transfer	
	DF	(India) Clarence Fernandes	Dempo U-18	23 July 2022	Free transfer	
	DF	(India) Felixson Fernandes	RF Young Champs	23 July 2022	Free transfer	
3	DF	(India) Sandesh Jhingan	ATK Mohun Bagan	14 August 2022	Free transfer	

=== Transfers out ===
No.	Position	Player	Outgoing club	Date	Fee	Ref
4	DF	(India) Pratik Chaudhari	Jamshedpur	5 June 2022	Free agent	
16	DF	(India) Sarthak Golui	East Bengal	5 June 2022	Free transfer	
10	MF	(Iran) Iman Basafa	(Iran) Kheybar Khorramabad	6 June 2022	Free transfer	
23	FW	(Brazil) Cleiton Silva	East Bengal	6 June 2022	Free transfer	
22	FW	(India) Ashique Kuruniyan	ATK Mohun Bagan	20 June 2022	Undisclosed	
29	DF	(Gabon) Yrondu Musavu-King	Without a club	15 July 2022	Free agent	
19	DF	(India) Ajith Kumar	Chennaiyin	28 July 2022	Undisclosed	

=== Loans out ===
No.	Position	Player	Outgoing club	Date	Fee	Duration	Ref
26	FW	(India) Bidyashagar Singh	Kerala Blasters	17 August 2022	Undisclosed	1 year	
20	MF	(India) Ajay Chhetri	Punjab FC	1 September 2022	Undisclosed	1 year	
	FW	(India) Rahul Raju	Gokulam Kerala	31 August 2022	Undisclosed	1 year	

=== Contract extensions ===
No.	Position	Player	Date	Ref
32	DF	(India) Roshan Singh	2026	
30	GK	(India) Lara Sharma	2026	
15	DF	(India) Wungngayam Muirang	2025	
27	DF	(India) Parag Shrivas	2025	
25	DF	(India) Namgyal Bhutia	2026	
31	FW	(India) Leon Augustine	2025	

== Players ==
Bengaluru FC has 38 players under contract; the following list of players is subject to change during the transfer season. The final squad for the ISL will be officially announced by the club later.

=== Players under contract ===
No.	Name	Nationality	Position	Date of Birth (Age)	Since	Until	Picked for Durand Cup	Picked for ISL	Picked for Super Cup
Goalkeepers
1	Gurpreet Singh Sandhu	(India)	GK	3 February 1992 (aged 30)	2017	2023	Yes	Yes	Yes
30	Lara Sharma	(India)	GK	1 October 1999 (aged 22)	2020	2026	Yes	Yes	Yes
43	Sharon Padattil	(India)	GK	18 April 2000 (aged 22)	2020	2023	No	Yes	Yes
50	Amrit Gope	(India)	GK	12 September 1999 (aged 22)	2022	2024	Yes	Yes	Yes
Defenders
2	Aleksandar Jovanović	(Australia) (Serbia)	CB	15 November 1997 (aged 24)	2022	2023	Yes	Yes	Yes
3	Sandesh Jhingan	(India)	CB	21 July 1993 (aged 28)	2022	2023	Yes	Yes	Yes
5	Alan Costa ‡	(Brazil)	CB	30 October 1990 (aged 31)	2021	2023	Yes	Yes	—N/a
15	Wungngayam Muirang	(India)	CB/LB	16 February 1999 (aged 23)	2020	2025	Yes	Yes	Yes
20	Hira Mondal ‡	(India)	LB	11 August 1991 (aged 30)	2022	2024	Yes	Yes	—N/a
27	Parag Shrivas	(India)	CB	9 June 1997 (aged 24)	2019	2025	Yes	Yes	Yes
32	Roshan Singh	(India)	LB	2 February 1999 (aged 23)	2020	2026	Yes (Note: joined after first two group stage games)	Yes	Yes
33	Prabir Das	(India)	RB	20 December 1993 (aged 28)	2022	2025	Yes	Yes	Yes
—	Clarence Fernandes	(India)	DF	25 July 2004 (aged 17)	2022	2025	No	No	No
—	Felixson Fernandes	(India)	CB	28 January 2003 (aged 19)	2022	2025	No	No	No
Midfielders
4	Ajay Chhetri †	(India)	CDM	7 July 1993 (aged 28)	2018	2022	—N/a	—N/a	—N/a
6	Bruno Ramires	(Brazil)	CM	18 March 1984 (aged 38)	2021	2023	Yes	Yes	Yes
7	Jayesh Rane	(India)	CDM	20 February 1993 (aged 29)	2021	2024	Yes	Yes	Yes
8	Suresh Singh	(India)	CDM	7 August 2000 (aged 21)	2019	2024	Yes	Yes	Yes
10	Javi Hernández	(Spain)	CAM	6 June 1989 (aged 32)	2022	2024	Yes	Yes	Yes
12	Danish Farooq Bhat †	(India)	LM	9 May 1996 (aged 26)	2021	2023	Yes	Yes	—N/a
18	Rohit Kumar	(India)	CDM	1 January 1997 (aged 25)	2021	2023	Yes	Yes	Yes
25	Namgyal Bhutia	(India)	RM	11 August 1999 (aged 22)	2020	2026	Yes	Yes	Yes
28	Amay Morajkar	(India)	CDM	20 June 2000 (aged 21)	2020	2024	No	No	No
31	Leon Augustine	(India)	RW/RM	2 October 1998 (aged 23)	2019	2025	Yes	Yes	Yes
35	Biswa Darjee	(India)	LM	8 November 1999 (aged 22)	2020	2024	Yes	Yes	Yes
36	Thoi Singh	(India)	MF	4 May 2004 (aged 18)			No	Yes	Yes
40	Damaitphang Lyngdoh	(India)	CAM	7 October 2003 (aged 18)	2021	2024	No	Yes	Yes
42	Akashdeep Singh	(India)	MF	18 February 2002 (aged 20)	2021	2024	No	No	No
Forwards
9	Prince Ibara	(Republic of the Congo)	CF	7 February 1996 (aged 26)	2021	2023	Yes	Yes	No
11	Sunil Chhetri	(India)	CF	3 August 1984 (aged 37)	2013	2023	Yes	Yes	Yes
14	Harmanpreet Singh	(India)	CF	2 September 2001 (aged 20)	2021	2023	No	Yes	Yes
17	Edmund Lalrindika	(India)	CF	24 April 1999 (aged 23)	2019	2022	No	No	No
21	Udanta Singh	(India)	RW	14 June 1996 (aged 25)	2014	2023	Yes	Yes	No
22	Roy Krishna	(Fiji)	CF	30 August 1987 (aged 34)	2022	2023	Yes	Yes	Yes
23	Faisal Ali	(India)	RW	20 October 1999 (aged 22)	2022	2025	Yes	Yes	No
24	Sudheer Kotikela	(India)	FW	20 August	2022	2024	No	No	No
26	Bidyashagar Singh †	(India)	FW	11 March 1998 (aged 24)	2021	2024	—N/a	—N/a	—N/a
38	Sivasakthi Narayanan	(India)	CF	9 July 2001 (aged 20)	2021	2022	Yes	Yes	Yes
−	Ankith Padmanabhan	(India)	FW		2022	2025	No	No	No

Last updated: 3 August 2022
Source: Bengaluru FC

^{†} Loaned out.

=== Injury record ===
N	P	Nat.	Name	Type	Status	Source	Match	Inj. Date	Ret. Date
14	GK	(India)	Harmanpreet Singh	knee injury			2021 Durand Cup semifinal vs Goa	13 October 2021	14 September 2022
42	MF	(India)	Akashdeep Singh	Unknown injury			2021 Durand Cup semifinal vs Goa	29 September 2021	Unknown
28	MF	(India)	Amay Morajkar	Unknown injury			Unknown	10 February 2022	29 March 2022
9	FW	(Republic of the Congo)	Prince Ibara	Unknown injury			2022 Durand Cup vs Goa	30 August 2022	Left the club injured

- Player is injured
- Player has recovered from injury
Last updated: 10 September 2022
Source: Bengaluru FC

== Pre-season ==
Bengaluru FC kicked off their pre-season training on 25 July 2022 with Simon Grayson leading the available squad in Ballari. Sunil Chhetri was part of the initial squad and made his record 10th pre-season appearance for the club. Midfielder Amay Morajkar, who had been out from the squad due to a long-term injury, also returned to the senior team in the training camp. On 27 July, the squad trained at Inspire Institute of Sport, a high-performance training center in Vijaynagar. New foreign signings Javi Hernández and Roy Krishna joined the training camp three days later.

On 14 August, faithful of Bengaluru FC reunited with the team for the first time in three years as the club hosted its traditional open pre-season training sessions at Bangalore Football Stadium (BFS), which is an event attended by the fans every season, to watch the club kickoff its new season. This season's event also featured the sale of free digital tickets for the first time. The last time when such an event was hosted at BFS was back in 2019 for the 2019–20 season. During the player announcement at the event, the club took off fans for a surprise after Sandesh Jhingan was announced as their new signing out of the blue. The Indian international had previously donned Bengaluru's jersey in the 2016-17 season.

== Competitions ==
=== Overview ===
Competition	First match	Last match	Starting round	Final position	Record							
Competition	First match	Last match	Starting round	Final position	Pld	W	D	L	GF	GA	GD	Win %
Super League	8 October 2022	18 March 2023	Matchday 1	4th out of 11; Runners up	24	13	2	9	32	27	+5	54.17
Super Cup	8 April 2023	25 April 2023	Group Stage	Runners up	5	2	2	1	7	4	+3	40.00
Durand Cup	17 August 2022	18 September 2022	Group Stage	Champions	7	5	2	0	14	6	+8	71.43
Total					36	20	6	10	53	37	+16	55.56

Last updated: 16 February 2022
Source: Competitions

=== Indian Super League ===
The league returned to its traditional home-away format after spending two seasons at a centralized venue in Goa during the pandemic. In August, the athletes raised concerns about the damage to the athletic track in Sree Kanteerava Stadium due to pitch maintenance work. In response to this, the Department of Youth Empowerment and Sports (DYES), Government of Karnataka, had stated that it was regular upkeep work and the stadium could be let out for football purposes as per 'official procedures.' The league kicked off in October, and a total of six instead of four top-placed teams qualified for the playoffs.

==== League table ====
Pos	Team	Pld	W	D	L	GF	GA	GD	Pts	Qualification
2	Hyderabad	20	13	3	4	36	16	+20	42	ISL Cup Semi-finals
3	ATK Mohun Bagan (W)	20	10	4	6	24	17	+7	34 (Note: Head-to-head points: ATK Mohun Bagan 3, Bengaluru 3. Head-to-head goal difference: ATK Mohun Bagan 0, Bengaluru 0. Head-to-head goal scored: ATK Mohun Bagan 4, Bengaluru 4. Goal difference: ATK Mohun Bagan +7, Bengaluru +4.)	ISL Cup Knockouts, Playoffs for 2023–24 AFC Cup qualifiers (Note: Qualified via winning the 2023 Indian Super League playoffs) and 2023–24 AFC Cup qualifiers (Note: Qualified via winning the Indian club qualifiers for 2023–24 AFC competitions) (Note: It was announced by AIFF that 2022-23 will be the last season in which the reigning Cup Winners will wear the Champions badge. Starting from 2023-24 season it will be the reigning League Shield Winners that will wear the Champions badge thereafter.)
4	Bengaluru	20	11	1	8	27	23	+4	34	ISL Cup Knockouts
5	Kerala Blasters	20	10	1	9	28	28	0	31	ISL Cup Knockouts
6	Odisha	20	9	3	8	30	32	−2	30	ISL Cup Knockouts, Playoffs for 2023–24 AFC Cup group stage (Note: Qualified via winning the 2023 Super Cup) and 2023–24 AFC Cup group stage (Note: Qualified via winning the Indian club qualifiers for 2023–24 AFC competitions)

Source: Indian Super League
Rules for classification: 1) points; 2) head-to-head points; 3) head-to-head goal difference; 4) head-to-head goals scored; 5) goal difference; 6) number of goals scored; 7) fair play ranking; 8) drawing of lots
(W) ISL Cup winners

==== Result summary ====
Overall								Home						Away					
Pld	W	D	L	GF	GA	GD	Pts	W	D	L	GF	GA	GD	W	D	L	GF	GA	GD
20	11	1	8	27	23	+4	34	7	0	3	14	9	+5	4	1	5	13	14	−1

==== Results by round ====
Matchday	1	2	3	4	5	6	7	8	9	10	11	12	13	14	15	16	17	18	19	20
Ground	H	A	A	A	H	A	A	H	A	H	H	A	A	H	A	H	A	H	H	H
Result	W	D	L	L	L	L	W	L	L	W	L	L	W	W	W	W	W	W	W	W
Position	2	3	5	6	9	10	9	9	9	8	8	9	7	8	7	6	6	5	4	3

Source: soccerway
A = Away; H = Home; W = Win; D = Draw; L = Loss

==== League stage ====
The fixtures for the 2022–23 season of ISL were announced on 1 September. Bengaluru FC faced NorthEast United on 8 October.

8 October 2022 1	Bengaluru	1–0	NorthEast United	Bengaluru
19:30 IST	Alan 87'	Report	Bora (yellow card) 60'; Gani (yellow card) 81'; Imran (yellow card) 86'	Stadium: Sree Kanteerava Stadium; Attendance: 19,379; Referee: Rahul Kumar Gupta; Man of the Match: Alan Costa (Bengaluru)

14 October 2022 2	Chennaiyin	1–1	Bengaluru	Chennai
19:30 IST	Prasanth 45+1'; Majumder (red card) 82'	Report	Krishna 5' (yellow card) 90+7'	Stadium: Jawaharlal Nehru Stadium; Attendance: 11,564; Referee: Crystal J. Man of the Match: Jiteshwor Singh (Chennaiyin)

22 October 2022 3	Hyderabad	1–0	Bengaluru	Hyderabad
19:30 IST	Ogbeche 83'; Mishra (yellow card) 86'	Report	Hernández (yellow card) 84'	Stadium: G. M. C. Balayogi Athletic Stadium; Attendance: 10,543; Referee: Umesh Bora; Man of the Match: Ogbeche (Hyderabad)

27 October 2022 4	Odisha	1–0	Bengaluru	Bhubaneswar
19:30 IST				Stadium: Kalinga Stadium; Attendance: 6,811; Man of the Match: Nandha Kumar Sekar

11 November 2022 5	Bengaluru	0–1	East Bengal	Bengaluru
19:30 IST				Stadium: Sree Kanteerava Stadium; Attendance: 12,817

17 November 2022 6	Mumbai City	4–0	Bengaluru	Mumbai
19:30 IST				Stadium: Mumbai Football Arena

26 November 2022 7	Goa	0–2	Bengaluru	Margao
17:30 IST				Stadium: Fatorda Stadium

3 December 2022 8	Bengaluru	0–1	ATK Mohun Bagan	Bengaluru
19:30 IST				Stadium: Sree Kanteerava Stadium

11 December 2022 9	Kerala Blasters	3–2	Bengaluru	Kochi
19:30 IST				Stadium: Jawaharlal Nehru Stadium (Kochi)

17 December 2022 10	Bengaluru	1–0	Jamshedpur	Bengaluru
17:30 IST				Stadium: Sree Kanteerava Stadium

23 December 2022 11	Bengaluru	0–3	Hyderabad	Bengaluru
19:30 IST				Stadium: Sree Kanteerava Stadium

30 December 2022 12	East Bengal	2–1	Bengaluru	Kolkata
19:30 IST				Stadium: Vivekananda Yuba Bharati Krirangan

6 January 2023 13	NorthEast United	1–2	Bengaluru	Guwahati
19:30 IST				Stadium: Indira Gandhi Athletic Stadium

14 January 2023 14	Bengaluru	3–1	Odisha	Bengaluru
17:30 IST				Stadium: Sree Kanteerava Stadium

19 January 2023 15	Jamshedpur	0–3	Bengaluru	Jamshedpur
17:30 IST				Stadium: JRD Tata Sports Complex

28 January 2023 16	Bengaluru	3–1	Chennaiyin	Bengaluru
17:30 IST				Stadium: Sree Kanteerava Stadium

5 February 2023 17	ATK Mohun Bagan	1–2	Bengaluru	Kolkata
19:30 IST				Stadium: Vivekananda Yuba Bharati Krirangan

11 February 2023 18	Bengaluru	1–0	Kerala Blasters	Bengaluru
19:30 IST				Stadium: Sree Kanteerava Stadium

15 February 2023 19	Bengaluru	2–1	Mumbai City	Bengaluru
19:30 IST	Naorem Roshan Singh (yellow card) 51'; Sunil Chhetri 57'; Javi Hernadez 70'		Ahmed Jahouh (yellow card) 26'; Vignesh Dakshinamurthy (yellow card) 45'; Mourtada Fall 77'	Stadium: Sree Kanteerava Stadium

23 February 2023 20	Bengaluru	3–1	Goa	Bengaluru
19:30 IST				Stadium: Sree Kanteerava Stadium

==== Playoffs ====
3 March 2023 Eliminator	Bengaluru	1–0 (a.e.t.)	Kerala Blasters	Bengaluru
19:30 IST	Chhetri 96'	Report		Stadium: Sree Kanteerava Stadium; Attendance: 20,301; Referee: Crystal John

==== Semifinals ====
7 March 2023	Mumbai City	0–1	Bengaluru	Mumbai
19:30 IST		Report	78' Chhetri	Stadium: Mumbai Football Arena; Attendance: 6,124; Referee: R Venkatesh; Man of the Match: Prabir Das

12 March 2023	Bengaluru	1–2 (a.e.t.) (9–8 p)	Mumbai City	Bengaluru
19:30 IST	Javi H. 22'	Report	Bipin 31'; Mehtab 66'	Stadium: Sree Kanteerava Stadium; Attendance: 21,901; Referee: Rahul Kumar Gupta
	Penalties
	Javi H. (penalty scored); Krishna (penalty scored); Alan Costa (penalty scored); Chhetri (penalty scored); Pérez (penalty scored); Prabir (penalty scored); Rohit (penalty scored); Suresh (penalty scored); Jhingan (penalty scored)		(penalty scored) Stewart; (penalty scored) Pereyra Díaz; (penalty scored) LZ Chhangte; (penalty scored) F. A. H. Jahouh; (penalty scored) Rahul; (penalty scored) Vikram; (penalty scored) M. Fall; (penalty scored) Vinit R; (penalty missed) Mehtab

2–2 on aggregate. Bengaluru won 9–8 on penalties.

==== Final ====
18 March 2023 Final	Bengaluru FC	2–2 (a.e.t.) (3-4 p)	ATK Mohun Bagan	Margao Goa
19:30 IST	Chhetri 45+4' (pen.); Krishna 78'		Petratos 14' (pen.), 85' (pen.)	Stadium: Fatorda Stadium; Attendance: 11879; Referee: Harish Kundu; Man of the Match: Petratos
	Penalties
	(penalty scored) Alan Costa; (penalty scored) Krishna; (penalty missed) B. Ramires; (penalty scored) Chhetri; (penalty missed) Pérez		D. Petratos (penalty scored); Liston (penalty scored); Kiyan (penalty scored); Manvir (penalty scored)

=== Durand Cup ===
Bengaluru FC had never won the Durand Cup and made their fourth appearance in the 131st edition of the tournament. They were clubbed in Group A with the defending champions FC Goa, two-time champions Mohammedan SC, Jamshedpur FC and one-time runners-up Indian Air Force, which is one of the four traditional armed forces' teams. Sunil Chhetri was reportedly set to play in Durand Cup after a gap of nine years.

On 15 August, Bengaluru announced a 25-man squad of primary players for the tournament which confirmed Chhetri's participation.

==== Group A ====
The squad touched down in Kolkata on 15 August and started their preparations on the same day for the first group stage game against Jamshedpur two days later. Bengaluru were facing the reserve side of Jamshedpur led by youth team coach Indranil Chakraborty. Sunil Chhetri opened the scoring for the dominant Bengaluru in the 23rd minute before debutant Roy Krishna doubled the lead in the 56th minute, helping Bengaluru kick-off their missing silverware quest with a 2–1 win, despite Rishi's consolation goal for Jamshedpur.

In the second game, Bengaluru faced Indian Air Force on 23 August where they breezed past the armed force side after scoring four goals in response to none. Roy Krishna and Sunil Chhetri found themselves on the scoresheet yet again in the first half while the substitutes Faisal Ali and Sivasakthi Narayanan added two more to the tally in the latter half. Bengaluru moved jointly to the top of the table along with Mohammedan. After the game, Bengaluru alleged racial abuse on one of their player from one of the opposition's player and raised the issue to the relevant authorities.

With two wins in two games, Bengaluru FC then faced the defending champions FC Goa who were fielding a reserve side this time around. Bengaluru yet again took an early 2-0 lead via back-to-back goals from Sunil Chhetri and Sivasakthi but failed to hold the lead after the Goan side with the likes of Phrangki Buam and Princeton Rebello who managed to equalise the score. Despite a draw, it ensured Bengaluru's qualification to the knock-out stage, with a game left to be played against hosts Mohammedan.

Bengaluru's final group stage encounter was against hosts Mohammedan SC. With both the teams already making cut into the knock-out stage, the match determined who tops the table in Group A and by virtue of which, will face an easier side from Group D in the quarter-finals. Simon Grayson made nine changes in the playing eleven from their previous game against Goa. A wonderful team combination play saw Mohammedan get an early lead in the 13th minute after Ningthoujam Pritam Singh tapped in the rebounded save from the Bengaluru's custodian Lara Sharma. The game turned into Bengaluru's way after Mohammedan's Abhishek Halder was sent off and his team was down to 10-men on the pitch. Bengaluru kept knokcing on the doors and finally broke it thanks to the Sivasakthi's shot which struck the crossbar and fell inwards before bouncing out. The game ended at stalemate and Mohammedan topped the group while Bengaluru's quarter-final clash was set up against Odisha FC.

Pos	Team	Pld	W	D	L	GF	GA	GD	Pts	Qualification	MOH	BEN	JAM	GOA	IAF
1	Mohammedan (H)	4	3	1	0	9	2	+7	10	Qualify for the Knockout stage	—	1–1	3–0	3–1	2–0
2	Bengaluru	4	2	2	0	9	4	+5	8	Qualify for the Knockout stage	—	—	2–1	2–2	4–0
3	Jamshedpur	4	2	0	2	4	6	−2	6		—	—	—	1–0	2–1
4	Goa	4	1	1	2	4	6	−2	4		—	—	—	—	1–0
5	Indian Air Force	4	0	0	4	1	9	−8	0		—	—	—	—	—

Source: Sportstar
Rules for classification: 1) points; 2) head-to-head points; 3) head-to-head goal difference; 4) goal difference; 5) number of goals scored; 6) drawing of lots
(H) Hosts

17 August 2022 2	Jamshedpur	1−2	Bengaluru	Kolkata
18.00 IST	Thakuri (yellow card) 25'; Angelo (yellow card) 40'; Rishi 61'	Report	Chhetri 23'; Mondal (yellow card) 42' (yellow-red card) 58'; Krishna 56'; Shrivas (yellow card) 86'	Stadium: Kishore Bharati Krirangan; Referee: Rahul Kumar Gupta; Man of the Match: Sunil Chhetri (Bengaluru)

23 August 2022 5	Bengaluru	4−0	Indian Air Force	Kolkata
18.00 IST	Krishna 9'; Songliansiam 23' (o.g.); Ramires (yellow card) 61'; Ali 68'; Narayanan 90+2'	Report		Stadium: Kishore Bharati Krirangan; Referee: Surojit Das; Man of the Match: Roy Krishna (Bengaluru)

30 August 2022 8	Bengaluru	2−2	Goa	Kolkata
18.00 IST	Ramires (yellow card) 9'; Chhetri 24'; Narayanan 26'; Udanta (yellow card) 56'	Report	Buam 53'; Rebello 64'	Stadium: Vivekananda Yuba Bharati Krirangan; Referee: Crystal John; Man of the Match: Phrangki Buam (Goa)

2 September 2022 10	Mohammedan	1–1	Bengaluru	Kolkata
18.00 IST	Pritam 13' (yellow card) 24'; Vanlalzuidika (yellow card) 27'; Halder (yellow card) 60' (yellow-red card) 73'; Ambekar (yellow card) 61'; N'Diaye (yellow card) 90+2'	Report	Suresh (yellow card) 34'; Rohit (yellow card) 66'; Narayanan 90+1'	Stadium: Vivekananda Yuba Bharati Krirangan; Referee: C R Srikrishna; Man of the Match: Shaher Shaheen (Mohammedan)

==== Knockout stage ====
After finishing second in the group stage, Bengaluru faced the toppers of Group D, Odisha in the third quarter-final. Both the sides did not lose a single game until this round, and as a matter of a fact, Odisha had won all their games in the group stage without conceding a single goal while scoring twelve. Naorem Roshan Singh who had returned to the squad from an illness was started by Simon Grayson for the first time in the tournament. After a close encounter in the first half, both the teams failed to disturb the scoresheet and it was much of the same in the second half. With only ten minutes left in the game, Shubham Sarangi went into the booking for the second time and was sent off, thus reducing Odisha to 10-men on the field. Bengaluru tried to take advantage of the situation, but were unable to score and hence pushed the game into extra-time.

Seven minutes into extra-time and one minute after being substituted, Sivasakthi gave Bengaluru the lead after turning the ball in which was rebounded off former Bengaluru FC's goalkeeper, Ralte's save. Despite having a numerical disadvantage, Odisha managed to pull off an equaliser as Diego Maurício headed home a free-kick in to the net in the 115th minute. When the game seemed to be heading towards a penalty shootout to break the tie, Ralte gave the ball away cheaply in the form of a throw in during the added time in the second half of the extra time, which was then picked up by Bengaluru and an attack was initiated with Faisal Ali playing it to Roy Krishna who then scored a 25-yard stunner to take Bengaluru FC into their third semi-final.

Semi-final was a barrier that Bengaluru had never been able to cross previously in two different attempts. In their third attempt, Bengaluru met Hyderabad FC in the second semi-final at the Vivekananda Yuba Bharati Krirangan. Hyderabad had topped Group C with three wins in four and had beaten Rajasthan United 3-1 in the fourth quarter-final on their way to maiden semi-final appearance. An evenly poised encounter saw Bengaluru score the opener at the half-hour mark via an own goal from Hyderabad's Odei Onaindia. Jayesh Rane, who had replaced Javi Hernandez from the previous game, played out wide to Prabir Das who put an inch perfect delivery near the goal mouth towards on rushing Roy Krishna, which was then deflected in to the net by Hyderabad's defender.

In the second half, Hyderabad threw everything at the goal, made several attacking moves and earned several set pieces but to no avail as Bengaluru's backline came on top with the likes of trio: Sandesh Jhingan, Aleksander Jovanovic and Parag Shrivas. Bengaluru were in to the finals of the Durand Cup for the first time in their history, and their first final appearance in any tournament since the 2018–19 season's final of Indian Super League. Bengaluru also became the only Indian club to play final of every major club competition in the country.

10 September 2022 Quarter-final	Odisha	1−2 (a.e.t.)	Bengaluru	Kolkata
18.00 IST	Gahlot (yellow card) 30'; Malik (yellow card) 72'; Sarangi (yellow card) 75' (yellow-red card) 85'; Panwar (yellow card) 90+2'; Maurício 115'	Report	Hernández (yellow card) 27'; Roshan (yellow card) 39'; Narayanan 97'; Krishna (yellow card) 90' (goal) 120+1'	Stadium: Kishore Bharati Krirangan; Referee: Dipu Roy; Man of the Match: Roy Krishna (Bengaluru)

15 September 2022 Semi-final	Bengaluru	1–0	Hyderabad	Kolkata
18.00 IST	Shrivas (yellow card) 17'; Onaindia 31' (o.g.); Kumar (yellow card) 38'	Report		Stadium: Vivekananda Yuba Bharati Krirangan; Referee: Rowan Arumughan; Man of the Match: Shrivas

===== Final =====
It was Bengaluru's maiden Durand Cup final appearance and their first cup final since the 2018 Super Cup. They were up against Mumbai City, who were also playing their maiden Durand Cup final. Mumbai City had topped Group B with two wins, a draw and a defeat at the hands of East Bengal. En route to the final, they had beaten Chennaiyin FC in the quarter-final in an eight goal thriller which was settled in the extra-time by Greg Stewart's 118th-minute winner, while in the semi-final, Mumbai overcame Mohammedan's challenge thanks to a 90th-minute winner by Bipin Singh.

After the traditional pre-match formalities in the Durand Cup final by the Indian Army, the matched kick-off with Bengaluru starting the game brightly of the two teams. It took only eleven minutes for the first time starter Sivasakthi, also the top scorer for Bengaluru in the tournament to take his side into an early lead. Aleksander Jovanovic's long ball directed at Sivasakthi, who beat the defense of Senegalese Mourtada Fall to successfully chip past the hapless Phurba Lachenpa in goal. Mumbai had their fair share of chances and they managed to convert one of those. It was exactly at the half hour mark when Mumbai pulled things to a level from a quickly taken free-kick as Apuia tapped the ball in off a rebounded shot that Gurpreet parried away. Both the sides went in to the half-time break with everything to play for in the latter half.

After the resumption, Bengaluru continued to attack and take their lead back and came close during the 60th minute when Jayesh's deftly lobbed ball in towards Chhetri saw Lachenpa saving the shot. A minute later, Bengaluru did find their lead as Chhetri's corner found the header of Alan Costa to make it 2-1 for Bengaluru in the 56th minute. Mumbai then initiated several attacks on Bengaluru's defense but one of those attacks was converted into a counter attack by Bengaluru, who almost put the game to bed had Lachenpa not made a wonderful save of Chhetri's shot. Mumbai almost equalised when Greg Stewart's long ranger shot rolled past few inches away from the goalpost. A final free-kick attempt by Mumbai was shot wide and the final whistle was blown, Bengaluru had grabbed their seventh trophy in the form of maiden Durand Cup silverware.

18 September 2022 Final	Mumbai City	1–2	Bengaluru	Kolkata
18.00 IST	Apuia 30'; Fall (yellow card) 44'	Report	Narayanan 10'; Jhingan (yellow card) 56'; Costa 56'; Ramires (yellow card) 90+5'	Stadium: Vivekananda Yuba Bharati Krirangan; Referee: C R Srikrishna; Man of the Match: Bruno Ramires (Bengaluru)

=== Super Cup ===
Super Cup returned to the Indian football calendar after it was suspended following the 2019 edition. Bengaluru FC, the inaugural edition's champions, will be participating in the 20-team tournament of eleven teams featuring from ISL and nine from I-League.

==== Group A ====
Pos	Team	Pld	W	D	L	GF	GA	GD	Pts		BEN	SRD	KER	RGP
1	Bengaluru	3	1	2	0	4	2	+2	5	Advance to knockout stage	—	1–1	1–1	—
2	Sreenidi Deccan	3	1	1	1	3	2	+1	4 (Note: Head-to-head points: Sreenidi Deccan 3, Kerala Blasters 0.)		—	—	2–0	—
3	Kerala Blasters	3	1	1	1	4	4	0	4		—	—	—	3–1
4	Punjab	3	1	0	2	2	5	−3	3		0–2	1–0	—	—

Source: AIFF
Rules for classification: 1) points; 2) head-to-head points; 3) head-to-head goal difference; 4) goal difference; 5) number of goals scored; 6) drawing of lots

===== Matches =====
8 April 2023 1	Bengaluru	1–1	Sreenidi Deccan	Kozhikode
17:00 IST	Hernández 10'	Report	Shayesteh 21'; Dinesh (yellow card) 24'	Stadium: EMS Stadium; Attendance: 3,214; Referee: Rowan Arumughan; Man of the Match: Bijay Chhetri (Sreenidi Deccan)

12 April 2023 2	RoundGlass Punjab	0–2	Bengaluru	Kozhikode
20:30 IST	K. Lhungdim (yellow card) 35'; Naocha (yellow card) 54' (yellow-red card) 78'	Report	Kumar (yellow card) 39'; Shrivas (yellow card) 40'; Jhingan (yellow card) 53'; Udanta 67'; Hernández 90+6' (pen.)	Stadium: EMS Stadium; Attendance: 2,375; Referee: Pratik Mondal; Man of the Match: Sandesh Jhingan (Bengaluru)

16 April 2023 3	Bengaluru	1–1	Kerala Blasters	Kozhikode
20:30 IST	Krishna 23' (yellow card) 45'	Report	Lešković (yellow card) 35'; Diamantakos 77'	Stadium: EMS Stadium; Attendance: 22,565; Referee: Rahul Kumar Gupta; Man of the Match: Javi Hernández (Bengaluru)

==== Semi-finals ====
21 April 2023 SF	Bengaluru	2–0	Jamshedpur	Calicut, Kerala
20:30 IST	Jhingan (yellow card) 53'; Rane 67'; Chhetri 84'	Report	Renthlei (yellow card) 61'	Stadium: EMS Stadium; Attendance: 3,458; Referee: Venkatesh R Man of the Match: Gurpreet Singh Sandhu (Bengaluru)

==== Final ====
25 April 2023	Bengaluru	1–2	Odisha	Kozhikode
19:00 IST	Suresh (yellow card) 22'; Chhetri (yellow card) 60', (goal) 85' (pen.)	Report	Maurício 23', 38'; Amrinder (yellow card) 29'; Narender (yellow card) 90+3'	Stadium: EMS Stadium; Attendance: 6,952; Referee: Rahul Kumar Gupta; Man of the Match: Diego Maurício (Odisha)

== Accolades ==
Bengaluru's captain, Sunil Chhetri, won the AIFF men's player of the year award for the record seventh time. He was nominated by the Indian national team's head coach Igor Stimac.

== Personnel ==
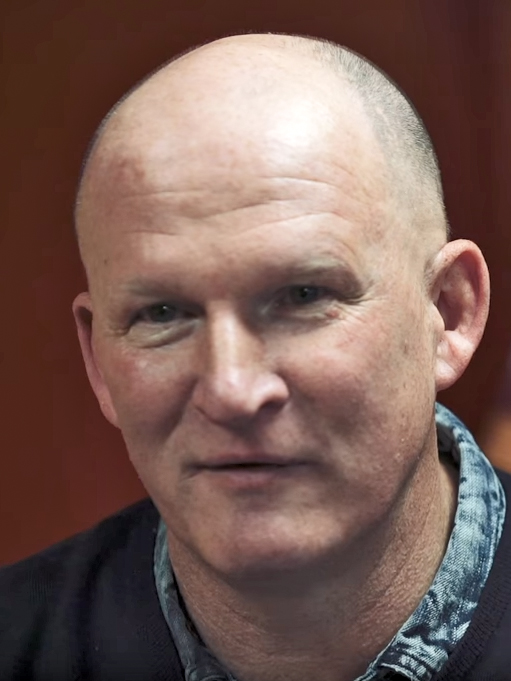
Grayson in 2018.

The German coach Marco Pezzaiuoli, who was previously appointed on a performance-based three-year contract in 2021, was released on 8 June 2021. On the same day, Bengaluru FC appointed the English manager Simon Grayson as their new head coach on a two-year deal. On 29 July, Englishmen Eric Kinder and Andy Beasley were appointed as the assistant and goalkeeping coaches, respectively.

Position	Name
Head coach	(England) Simon Grayson
Assistant coach	(England) Eric Kinder
Assistant coach/Reserve team head coach	(India) Naushad Moosa
Goalkeeping coach	(England) Andy Beasley
Strength and conditioning coach	(India) Diwakar M.
Team manager	(India) Rosewall Da Cunha
Video analyst	(India) Alwin Lawrence
Masseur	(India) Manu Prasad
Kit Boy	(India) Gireesh PM

== Statistics ==
=== Appearances and goals ===
No.	Pos	Nat	Player	Total		ISL		Durand Cup		Super Cup	
No.	Pos	Nat	Player	Apps	Goals	Apps	Goals	Apps	Goals	Apps	Goals
Goalkeepers
1	GK	(India) IND	Gurpreet Singh Sandhu	5	0	0+0	0	5+0	0	0+0	0
30	GK	(India) IND	Lara Sharma	1	0	0+0	0	1+0	0	0+0	0
43	GK	(India) IND	Sharon Padattil	0	0	0+0	0	0+0	0	0+0	0
50	GK	(India) IND	Amrit Gope	1	0	0+0	0	1+0	0	0+0	0
Defenders
2	DF	(Australia) AUS	Aleksandar Jovanović	6	0	0+0	0	5+1	0	0+0	0
3	DF	(India) IND	Sandesh Jhingan	5	0	0+0	0	5+0	0	0+0	0
5	DF	(Brazil) BRA	Alan Costa	4	1	0+0	0	3+1	1	0+0	0
15	DF	(India) IND	Wungngayam Muirang	2	0	0+0	0	1+1	0	0+0	0
20	DF	(India) IND	Hira Mondal	3	0	0+0	0	3+0	0	0+0	0
27	DF	(India) IND	Parag Shrivas	6	0	0+0	0	4+2	0	0+0	0
32	DF	(India) IND	Roshan Singh	3	0	0+0	0	3+0	0	0+0	0
33	DF	(India) IND	Prabir Das	6	0	0+0	0	6+0	0	0+0	0
—	DF	(India) IND	Clarence Fernandes	0	0	0+0	0	0+0	0	0+0	0
—	DF	(India) IND	Felixson Fernandes	0	0	0+0	0	0+0	0	0+0	0
Midfielders
4	MF	(India) IND	Ajay Chhetri	0	0	0+0	0	0+0	0	0+0	0
6	MF	(Brazil) BRA	Bruno Ramires	6	0	0+0	0	6+0	0	0+0	0
7	MF	(India) IND	Jayesh Rane	5	0	0+0	0	3+2	0	0+0	0
8	MF	(India) IND	Suresh Singh Wangjam	3	0	0+0	0	3+0	0	0+0	0
10	MF	(Spain) ESP	Javi Hernández	3	0	0+0	0	2+1	0	0+0	0
12	MF	(India) IND	Danish Farooq Bhat	5	0	0+0	0	2+3	0	0+0	0
18	MF	(India) IND	Rohit Kumar	5	0	0+0	0	4+1	0	0+0	0
25	MF	(India) IND	Namgyal Bhutia	5	0	0+0	0	2+3	0	0+0	0
28	MF	(India) IND	Amay Morajkar	0	0	0+0	0	0+0	0	0+0	0
31	MF	(India) IND	Leon Augustine	5	0	0+0	0	1+4	0	0+0	0
35	MF	(India) IND	Biswa Darjee	0	0	0+0	0	0+0	0	0+0	0
40	MF	(India) IND	Damaitphang Lyngdoh	0	0	0+0	0	0+0	0	0+0	0
42	MF	(India) IND	Akashdeep Singh	0	0	0+0	0	0+0	0	0+0	0
Forwards
9	FW	(Republic of the Congo) CGO	Prince Ibara	1	0	0+0	0	1+0	0	0+0	0
11	FW	(India) IND	Sunil Chhetri	7	2	0+0	0	7+0	2	0+0	0
14	FW	(India) IND	Harmanpreet Singh	0	0	0+0	0	0+0	0	0+0	0
17	FW	(India) IND	Edmund Lalrindika	0	0	0+0	0	0+0	0	0+0	0
19	FW	(India) IND	Faisal Ali	5	1	0+0	0	1+4	1	0+0	0
21	FW	(India) IND	Udanta Singh	5	0	0+0	0	2+3	0	0+0	0
22	FW	(Fiji) FIJ	Roy Krishna	6	3	0+0	0	5+1	3	0+0	0
24	FW	(India) IND	Sudheer Kotikela	0	0	0+0	0	0+0	0	0+0	0
39	FW	(India) IND	Sivasakthi Narayanan	6	5	0+0	0	1+5	5	0+0	0
—	FW	(India) IND	Ankith Padmanabhan	0	0	0+0	0	0+0	0	0+0	0

- Source: soccerway

Updated: 18 September 2022

=== Goal scorers ===
Rank	No.	Pos	Nat	Player	ISL	DC	SC	Total
1	38	FW	(India)	Sivasakthi Narayanan	0	4	0	5
2	22	FW	(Fiji)	Roy Krishna	0	3	0	3
3	11	FW	(India)	Sunil Chhetri	0	2	0	2
4	23	DF	(India)	Faisal Ali	0	1	0	1
4	5	DF	(Brazil)	Alan Costa	0	1	0	1
Own goals					0	2	0	2
TOTALS					0	14	0	14

Updated: 18 September 2022

=== Clean sheets ===
Rank	No.	Pos	Nat	Player	ISL	DC	SC	Total
1	1	GK	(India)	Gurpreet Singh Sandhu	0	2	0	2
TOTALS					0	2	0	2

Updated: 15 September 2022

=== Assists ===
Rank	No.	Pos	Nat	Player	ISL	DC	SC	Total
1	23	DF	(India)	Prabir Das	0	2	0	2
1	21	FW	(India)	Udanta Singh	0	2	0	2
1	2	DF	(Australia) (Serbia)	Aleksander Jovanovic	0	2	0	2
2	22	FW	(Fiji)	Roy Krishna	0	1	0	1
2	8	MF	(India)	Suresh Singh Wangjam	0	1	0	1
2	31	MF	(India)	Leon Augustine	0	1	0	1
2	19	FW	(India)	Faisal Ali	0	1	0	1
2	11	FW	(India)	Sunil Chhetri	0	1	0	1
TOTALS					0	11	0	11

Updated: 18 September 2022

=== Disciplinary record ===
Rank	No.	Pos	Nat	Player	ISL			DC			SC			Total			Notes
Rank	No.	Pos	Nat	Player	Yellow card	Second yellow card	Red card	Yellow card	Second yellow card	Red card	Yellow card	Second yellow card	Red card	Yellow card	Second yellow card	Red card	Notes
1	22	DF	(India)	Hira Mondal	0	0	0	0	1	0	0	0	0	0	1	0	Missed a game, against Indian Air Force (red card) (23 August 2022)
1	6	DF	(India)	Bruno Ramires	0	0	0	3	0	0	0	0	0	3	0	0	N/A
2	18	MF	(India)	Rohit Kumar	0	0	0	2	0	0	0	0	0	2	0	0	N/A
2	32	DF	(India)	Roshan Singh	0	0	0	2	0	0	0	0	0	2	0	0	N/A
2	27	DF	(India)	Parag Shrivas	0	0	0	2	0	0	0	0	0	2	0	0	N/A
3	21	FW	(India)	Udanta Singh	0	0	0	1	0	0	0	0	0	1	0	0	N/A
3	8	MF	(India)	Suresh Singh	0	0	0	1	0	0	0	0	0	1	0	0	N/A
3	10	MF	(Spain)	Javi Hernández	0	0	0	1	0	0	0	0	0	1	0	0	N/A
3	22	MF	(India)	Roy Krishna	0	0	0	1	0	0	0	0	0	1	0	0	N/A
3	6	MF	(Brazil)	Bruno Ramires	0	0	0	1	0	0	0	0	0	1	0	0	N/A
TOTALS					0	0	0	11	1	0	0	0	0	11	1	0	

Disciplinary points (yellow card = 1 point, red card as a result of two yellow cards = 3 points, direct red card = 3 points, yellow card followed by direct red card = 4 points);
Updated: 18 September 2022

== See also ==
- List of Bengaluru FC seasons
