= 2023–24 Bengaluru FC season =

11th season in the existence of Bengaluru FC

Bengaluru FC
2023–24 season
- West Block Blues unfurl Dr. Puneeth Rajkumar's banner ahead of Bengaluru FC vs FC Goa, 25 October 2023.
- Chairman: Parth Jindal
- Manager: Simon Grayson (until 8 December); Gerard Zaragoza (from 14 December)
- Stadium: Sree Kanteerava Stadium
- Indian Super League: 10th
- Super Cup: Group Stage
- Durand Cup: Group Stage
- Top goalscorer: League: Javi Hernandez (5 goal); All: Javi Hernandez (6 goal)
- Highest home attendance: 27,923
- Lowest home attendance: 2,923
- Average home league attendance: 7,954
- Biggest defeat: 4-0
Home colours	Away colours	Third colours
- All statistics correct as of 14 August 2023.

The 2023–24 season is Bengaluru FC's eleventh season as a club since its establishment in 2013. The season for the Blues kicked off with title defending task at the 2023 Durand Cup.

== Background ==
In the previous season, the squad of Bengaluru was yet again overhauled with Englishman Simon Grayson at the helm accompanied by several fresh signings. The freshly built squad went on to lift the 2022 Durand Cup, which was the club's maiden Durand Cup title. This also made Simon Grayson the fastest Bengaluru head coach to win a title, which took him only 102 days, beating the record of Carles Cuadrat who took 259 days. They would go on to finish as runners-up in the previous season of ISL and in the Super Cup.

=== Transfers in ===
No.	Position	Player	Previous club	Date	Fee	Ref
30	GK	(India) Sahil Poonia	(India) Zinc FA	1 June 2023	Free	
19	FW	(India) Halicharan Narzary	(India) Hyderabad	14 June 2023	Free	
33	GK	(India) Vikram Lakhbir Singh	(India) Aizawl	21 June 2023	Free	
23	DF	(Montenegro) Slavko Damjanović	(India) Mohun Bagan	28 June 2023	Free	
24	FW	(India) Rohit Danu	(India) Hyderabad	7 July 2023	Free	
35	FW	(India) Salam Johnson Singh	(India) TRAU	10 July 2023	Free	
9	FW	(England) Curtis Main	(Scotland) St Mirren	18 July 2023	Free	
14	DF	(India) Jessel Carneiro	(India) Kerala Blasters	25 July 2023	Free	
16	MF	(India) Shankar Sampingiraj	(India) Punjab	25 July 2023	Free	
7	MF	(Australia) Ryan Williams	(Australia) Perth Glory	28 July 2023	Free	
6	MF	(Netherlands) Keziah Veendorp	(Netherlands) Emmen	5 August 2023	Free	
	DF	(India) Chinglensana Singh Konsham	(India) Hyderabad FC	30 January 2024	Free	
	DF	(India) Nikhil Poojary	(India) Hyderabad FC	1 February 2024	Free	

==== Promoted from youth system ====
No.	Position	Player	Previous club	Date	Fee	Ref
44	DF	(India) Robin Yadav	(India) Bengaluru B	1 June 2023	Internal transfer (Youth system)	
38	FW	(India) Ankith Padmanabhan	(India) Bengaluru B	1 August 2023	Internal transfer (Youth system)	
49	MF	(India) Harsh Patre	(India) Bengaluru B	31 August 2023	Internal transfer (Youth system)	
51	DF	(India) Chingambam Shivaldo Singh	(India) Bengaluru B	1 December 2023	Internal transfer (Youth system)	
41	FW	(India) Monirul Molla	(India) Bengaluru B	1 June 2023	Internal transfer (Youth system)	

== Overview ==
=== Competitions ===
Competition	First match	Last match	Starting round	Final position	Record							
Competition	First match	Last match	Starting round	Final position	Pld	W	D	L	GF	GA	GD	Win %
Super League	21 September 2023	30 March 2023	Matchday 1	10th	22	5	7	10	20	34	−14	22.73
Super Cup	8 April 2023	25 April 2023	Group Stage	Runners up	3	0	1	2	1	3	−2	0.00
Durand Cup	17 August 2022	18 September 2022	Group Stage	Champions	3	1	2	0	5	3	+2	33.33
Total					28	6	10	12	26	40	−14	21.43

Last updated: 31 May 2024
Source: Competitions

=== First-team squad ===
As of 6 October 2023

Note: Flags indicate national team as defined under FIFA eligibility rules; some limited exceptions apply. Players may hold more than one non-FIFA nationality.

No.	Pos.	Nation	Player
1	GK	IND	Gurpreet Singh Sandhu
2	DF	IND	Parag Shrivas
4	DF	AUS	Aleksandar Jovanović
6	MF	NED	Keziah Veendorp
7	FW	AUS	Ryan Williams
8	MF	IND	Suresh Singh Wangjam
9	FW	ENG	Curtis Main
10	MF	ESP	Javi Hernández
11	FW	IND	Sunil Chhetri (captain)
13	GK	IND	Amrit Gope
14	DF	IND	Jessel Carneiro
16	DF	IND	Shankar Sampingiraj
18	MF	IND	Rohit Kumar
19	FW	IND	Halicharan Narzary

No.	Pos.	Nation	Player
23	DF	MNE	Slavko Damjanović
24	MF	IND	Rohit Danu
25	DF	IND	Namgyal Bhutia
29	FW	IND	Ashish Jha
30	GK	IND	Sahil Poonia
32	MF	IND	Naorem Roshan Singh
33	GK	IND	Vikram Lahkbir Singh
38	FW	IND	Ankith Padmanabhan
39	FW	IND	Sivasakthi Narayanan
41	FW	IND	Monirul Molla
44	DF	IND	Robin Yadav
45	MF	IND	Lalremtluanga Fanai
46	MF	IND	Shreyas Ketkar
49	MF	IND	Harsh Patre

== Indian Super League ==
=== League table ===
Pos	Team	Pld	W	D	L	GF	GA	GD	Pts	Qualification
8	Punjab	22	6	6	10	28	35	−7	24 (Note: Head-to-head points: Punjab 4, East Bengal 1.)	
9	East Bengal	22	6	6	10	27	29	−2	24	Qualification for the Champions League Two preliminary stage (Note: East Bengal qualified for the AFC Champions League Two preliminary stage by winning the 2024 Super Cup.)
10	Bengaluru	22	5	7	10	20	34	−14	22	
11	Jamshedpur	22	5	6	11	27	32	−5	21	
12	Hyderabad	22	1	5	16	10	43	−33	8	

Source: Indian Super League
Rules for classification: 1) points; 2) head-to-head points; 3) head-to-head goal difference; 4) head-to-head goals scored; 5) goal difference; 6) number of goals scored; 7) fair play ranking

=== League Matches ===
Note: FSDL and the Indian Super League announced the fixtures for the first half of the season on 7 September with the remaining fixtures to be released on late 2023.

21 September 2023 1	Kerala Blasters	2–1	Bengaluru	Kochi
20:00 IST	Veendorp 52' (o.g.); Luna 69', (yellow card) 90+7'	Report	Carneiro (yellow card) 26'; Main 90'	Stadium: Jawaharlal Nehru Stadium; Attendance: 34,911; Referee: Rahul Gupta; Man of the Match: Adrián Luna (Kerala Blasters)

27 September 2023 2	Mohun Bagan SG	1–0	Bengaluru	Kolkata
20:00 IST	Hugo Boumous 68'	Report		Stadium: Vivekananda Yuba Bharati Krirangan; Attendance: 29,552; Referee: Haris Kundu; Man of the Match: Hugo Boumous (Mohun Bagan)

4 October 2023 3	Bengaluru	2–1	East Bengal FC	Bengaluru
20:00 IST	Chhetri 21' (pen.); Damjanović (yellow card) 70'; Hernández 72'; F Lalremtluanga (yellow card) 90'; Rohit Kumar (yellow card) 90+7'	Report	Mahesh 15' (yellow card) 45+2'; Herrera (yellow card) 30'; Kumar (yellow card) 38'	Stadium: Sree Kanteerava Stadium; Attendance: 5,913; Referee: Senthil Nathan; Man of the Match: Ryan Williams (Bengaluru)

25 October 2023 4	Bengaluru	0–0	Goa	Bengaluru
20:00 IST				Stadium: Sree Kanteerava Stadium

31 October 2023 5	Odisha	3–2	Bengaluru	Bhubaneswar
20:00 IST	Puitea 23'; Isak Vanlalruatfela 45'; Amey Ranawade 60'		Chhetri 8'; Ryan Williams 18'	Stadium: Kalinga Stadium

4 November 2023 6	Hyderabad	1–1	Bengaluru	Hyderabad
20:00 IST	Mohammad Yasir 35'		Ryan Williams 58'	Stadium: GMC Balayogi Athletic Stadium

26 November 2023 7	NorthEast United	1–1	Bengaluru	Guwahati
20:00 IST	Aleksandar Jovanović 45+3' (o.g.)		Chhetri 36' (pen.)	Stadium: Indira Gandhi Athletic Stadium

30 November 2023 8	Bengaluru	3–3	Punjab	Bengaluru
20:00 IST	Harsh Patre 25'; Main 45+1'; Hernández 67'		Nikhil Prabhu 19'; Dimitrios Chatziisaias 26'; Luka Majcen 30'	Stadium: Sree Kanteerava Stadium

8 December 2023 9	Bengaluru	0–4	Mumbai City	Bengaluru
20:00 IST			El Khayati 11'; Akash Mishra 30'; Díaz 57' (pen.); Lallianzuala Chhangte 61' (pen.)	Stadium: Sree Kanteerava Stadium

13 December 2023 10	Chennaiyin	2–0	Bengaluru	Chennai
20:00 IST	Rafael Crivellaro 6' (pen.); Murray 50' (pen.)			Stadium: Jawaharlal Nehru Stadium

16 December 2023 11	Bengaluru	1–0	Jamshedpur	Bengaluru
17:30 IST	Hernández 67' (pen.)			Stadium: Sree Kanteerava Stadium

24 December 2023 12	Bengaluru	1–1	NorthEast United	Bengaluru
17:30 IST				Stadium: Sree Kanteerava Stadium

3 February 2024 13	Punjab	3–1	Bengaluru	New Delhi
17:00 IST				Stadium: Jawaharlal Nehru Stadium; Attendance: 3,945; Referee: Venkatesh Ramachandran

7 February 2024 14	Bengaluru	1–0	Chennaiyin	Bengaluru
20:00 IST		Report		Stadium: Sree Kanteerava Stadium; Attendance: 4,231; Referee: Crystal John

11 February 2024 15	Jamshedpur	1–1	Bengaluru	Jamshedpur
17:00 IST		Report		Stadium: JRD Tata Sports Complex; Attendance: 12,605; Referee: Venkatesh Ramachandran

18 February 2024 16	Mumbai City	2–0	Bengaluru	Mumbai
17:00 IST		Report		Stadium: Mumbai Football Arena; Attendance: 5,866; Referee: Pranjal Banerjee

24 February 2024 17	Bengaluru	2–1	Hyderabad	Bengaluru
20:00 IST		Report		Stadium: Sree Kanteerava Stadium; Attendance: 2,323; Referee: Pratik Mondal

2 March 2024 18	Bengaluru	1–0	Kerala Blasters	Bengaluru
20:00 IST		Report		Stadium: Sree Kanteerava Stadium; Attendance: 27,923; Referee: R Venkatesh

14 March 2024 19	Goa	2–1	Bengaluru	Goa
20:00 IST		Report		Stadium: Fatorda Stadium; Attendance: 7,384; Referee: Crystal John

30 March 2024 20	Bengaluru	0–0	Odisha	Bengaluru
17:00 IST		Report		Stadium: Sree Kanteerava Stadium; Attendance: 7,823; Referee: Harish Kundu

7 April 2024 21	East Bengal	2–1	Bengaluru	Kolkata
20:00 IST		Report		Stadium: Salt Lake Stadium; Attendance: 19,989; Referee: Tejas Nagvenkar

11 April 2024 22	Bengaluru	0–4	Mohun Bagan	Bengaluru
20:00 IST		Report		Stadium: Sree Kanteerava Stadium; Attendance: 9,239; Referee: Rahul Gupta

== Durand Cup ==
Group C

Pos	Team	Pld	W	D	L	GF	GA	GD	Pts	Qualification	GOK	BEN	KER	IAF
1	Gokulam Kerala	3	2	0	1	6	5	+1	6	Qualify for the knockout stage	—	—	—	2–0
2	Bengaluru	3	1	2	0	5	3	+2	5		2–0	—	2–2	1–1
3	Kerala Blasters	3	1	1	1	10	6	+4	4		3–4	—	—	5–0
4	Indian Air Force	3	0	1	2	1	8	−7	1		—	—	—	—

Source: Twitter
Rules for classification: Group stage tiebreakers

=== Matches ===
14 August 2023 1	Bengaluru	1–1	Indian Air Force	Kolkata
18.00 IST	S. Johnson Singh 58'	Report	V. Kumar 20'	Stadium: Kishore Bharati Krirangan; Man of the Match: Vivek Kumar (Indian Air Force)

18 August 2023 2	Bengaluru	2–2	Kerala Blasters	Kolkata
18.00 IST	Lalrindika 38'; A. Jha 51'	Report	J. Emmanuel 14'; Ruivah (yellow card) 42' (yellow-red card) 85'; M. Aimen 84'	Stadium: Kishore Bharati Krirangan; Man of the Match: Bekey Oram (Bengaluru)

22 August 2023 3	Bengaluru	2–0	Gokulam Kerala	Kolkata
18.00 IST	R. Yadav 58'; Lalpekhlua 89'	Report		Stadium: Kishore Bharati Krirangan; Man of the Match: Robin Yadav (Bengaluru)

== Super Cup ==
=== Matches ===
Pos	Team	Pld	W	D	L	GF	GA	GD	Pts	Qualification	OFC	FCG	BEN	IKA
1	Odisha	3	3	0	0	7	2	+5	9	Advance to knockout stage	—	3–2	1–0	3–0
2	Goa	3	2	0	1	5	4	+1	6		—	—	1–0	2–1
3	Bengaluru	3	0	1	2	1	3	−2	1		—	—	—	1–1
4	Inter Kashi	3	0	1	2	2	6	−4	1		—	—	—	—

Source: AIFF
Rules for classification: 1) points; 2) head-to-head points; 3) head-to-head goal difference; 4) goal difference; 5) number of goals scored; 6) drawing of lots

12 January 2024 1	Odisha	1–0	Bengaluru	Bhubaneswar
19:30 IST	Jahouh 21'	Report		Stadium: Kalinga Stadium; Man of the Match: Ahmed Jahouh (Odisha)

17 January 2024 2	Goa	1–0	Bengaluru	Bhubaneswar
14:00 IST	Brison Fernandes 90+3'	Report		Stadium: Kalinga Stadium Pitch 1 Man of the Match: Brison Fernandes (Goa)

22 January 2024 3	Bengaluru	1–1	Inter Kashi	Bhubaneswar
14:00 IST	Javi 58' (pen.)	Report	Edmund 15'	Stadium: Kalinga Stadium Pitch 1 Man of the Match: Ryan Williams (Bengaluru

== Statistics ==
=== Goal scorers ===
Rank	No.	Pos	Nat	Player	ISL	DC	SC	Total
1	10	MF	(Spain)	Javi Hernández	3	0	0	3
1	11	FW	(India)	Sunil Chhetri	3	0	0	3
2	7	FW	(Australia)	Ryan Williams	2	0	0	2
2	9	FW	(England)	Curtis Main	2	0	0	2
5	49	MF	(India)	Harsh Patre	1	0	0	1
Own goals					0	0	0	0
TOTALS					11	0	0	11

Updated: 30 November 2023

== See also ==
- 2023–24 Bengaluru FC B season
