= Faisal Ali =

Faisal Ali may refer to:

- Faisal Ali Hassan (born 1981), Emarati footballer
- Faisal Ali (footballer) (born 1999), Indian footballer
