= 2016 Atlético de Kolkata season =

3rd season in existence of Atlético de Kolkata

Atlético de Kolkata
2016 season
- Head Coach: José Francisco Molina
- Stadium: Rabindra Sarobar Stadium
- ISL: 4th
- ISL finals: Winners
- Top goalscorer: Iain Hume (7)
- Highest home attendance: 12,575
- Lowest home attendance: 10,589
- Average home league attendance: 11,703

The 2016 Atlético de Kolkata season was the club's third season since its establishment in 2014 and their third season in the Indian Super League. The 2016 season was Atlético de Kolkata's last season before it got separated with the Spanish La Liga club Atlético Madrid to form ATK.

This season will also be the first in which the club is coached by Spaniard José Francisco Molina, replacing Antonio López Habas who served as head coach the previous two seasons. At the end of the season, Atlético de Kolkata came out as winners after defeating the Kerala Blasters in a penalty shootout, 4–3, during the final. The match had ended 1–1 after ninety minutes and extra time.

== Background ==
Atlético de Kolkata entered the 2015 season as the first defending winners of the Indian Super League. Their title defense began on 3 October 2015 against Chennaiyin. A brace my new marquee, Hélder Postiga, helped Atlético de Kolkata win the match 3–2. They would go on the finish the regular season in second place, two points behind first place Goa. They would enter the finals facing off against Chennaiyin again. A 3–0 victory by Chennaiyin in the first leg all but sealed the fate for Kolkata, which was confirmed after Atlético de Kolkata could only manage a 2–1 victory in the second leg.

== Player movement ==
=== Retained players ===
Foreign players

Position	Player
DF	(Spain) Tiri
MF	(Botswana) Ofentse Nato
MF	(South Africa) Sameehg Doutie
FW	(Canada) Iain Hume

Indian players

Position	Player
DF	(India) Arnab Mondal
MF	(India) Jewel Raja

=== Signings ===
==== In ====
Position	Player	Old club	Date	Ref
GK	(India) Shilton Pal	(India) Mohun Bagan	14 June 2016	
GK	(India) Debjit Majumder	(India) Mohun Bagan	14 June 2016	
DF	(India) Pritam Kotal	(India) Mohun Bagan	14 June 2016	
DF	(India) Kingshuk Debnath	(India) Mohun Bagan	14 June 2016	
DF	(India) Robert Lalthlamuana	(India) East Bengal	14 June 2016	
DF	(India) Prabir Das	(India) Mohun Bagan	14 June 2016	
MF	(India) Bikramjit Singh	(India) Mohun Bagan	14 June 2016	
MF	(India) Bidyananda Singh	India U20	14 June 2016	
MF	(India) Bikash Jairu	(India) East Bengal	14 June 2016	
MF	(India) Lalrindika Ralte	(India) East Bengal	14 June 2016	

== Indian Super League ==
Pos	Team	Pld	W	D	L	GF	GA	GD	Pts	Qualification
2	Kerala Blasters	14	6	4	4	12	14	−2	22	Advance to ISL Play-offs
3	Delhi Dynamos	14	5	6	3	27	17	+10	21	Advance to ISL Play-offs
4	Atlético de Kolkata (C)	14	4	8	2	16	14	+2	20	Advance to ISL Play-offs
5	NorthEast United	14	5	3	6	14	14	0	18	
6	Pune City	14	4	4	6	13	16	−3	16	

Source: Indian Super League
Rules for classification: 1) points; 2) head-to-head points; 3) head-to-head goal difference; 4) goal difference; 5) number of goals scored; 6) play-off match
(C) Champions

== See also ==
- 2016–17 in Indian football
