= List of Bengaluru FC seasons =

Bengaluru FC is an Indian professional association football club based in Bengaluru. The club was formed in 2013.

Bengaluru FC have won the I-League and the Federation Cup twice.

== Key ==
- P = Played
- W = Games won
- D = Games drawn
- L = Games lost
- F = Goals for
- A = Goals against
- Pts = Points
- Pos = Final position
- IL = I-League
- W = Winner
- RU = Runners-up
- SF = Semi-finals
- QF = Quarter-finals
- R16 = Round of 16
- IZSF = Inter-zonal semi-finals
- IZF = Inter-zonal finals
- GS = Group stage
- PR1 = Preliminary Round 1
- PR2 = Preliminary Round 2

1st or W	Winners
2nd or RU	Runners-up
↑	Promoted
↓	Relegated
♦	Top scorer in division

== Seasons ==
Results of league and cup competitions by season
Season	Division	P	W	D	L	F	A	Pts	Pos	Federation Cup	Durand Cup	Asia		Name	Goals
Season	League									Federation Cup	Durand Cup	Tournament	Round reached	Top goalscorer	
2013–14	IL	24	14	5	5	42	28	47	1st	GS	DNP	—	—	(India) Sunil Chhetri	15 ♦ (Note: Joint holder of I-League Golden Boot with Darryl Duffy and Cornell Glen, all of whom scored 14 goals.)
2014–15	IL	20	10	7	3	35	19	37	2nd	W	SF	Champions League	PR1	(India) Sunil Chhetri	14
2014–15	IL	20	10	7	3	35	19	37	2nd	W	SF	AFC Cup	R16	(India) Sunil Chhetri	14
2015–16	IL	16	10	2	4	24	17	32	1st	QF	DNH	AFC Cup	RU	(India) Sunil Chhetri	9
2016–17	IL	20	8	6	4	30	15	30	4th	W	DNP	Champions League	PR2	(India) Sunil Chhetri	12
2016–17	IL	20	8	6	4	30	15	30	4th	W	DNP	AFC Cup	IZF	(India) Sunil Chhetri	12

Season	Division	P	W	D	L	F	A	Pts	Pos	Super Cup	Durand Cup	Asia		Name	Goals
Season	League									Super Cup	Durand Cup	Tournament	Round reached	Top goalscorer	
2017–18	ISL	21	14	2	5	40	20	44	League – 1st Playoffs – Runner-up	W	DNH	AFC Cup	IZSF	(India) Sunil Chhetri	24
2018–19	ISL	21	12	4	5	34	23	40	League – 1st Playoffs – Winners	QF	DNH	—	—	(India) Sunil Chhetri	10
2019–20	ISL	20	9	6	5	24	16	33	League – 3rd Playoffs – Semifinals	—	GS	AFC Cup	play-offs	(India) Sunil Chhetri	11
2020–21	ISL	20	5	7	8	26	28	22	7th	—	DNH	AFC Cup	GS	(Brazil) Cleiton Silva	10
2021–22	ISL	20	8	5	7	32	27	29	6th	—	SF	—	—	(Brazil) Cleiton Silva	10
2022–23	ISL	20	11	1	8	27	23	+4	League - 4th Playoffs-Runner up	Runner-ups	W	—	—	(India) Sivasakthi Narayanan	11
2023-24	ISL	22	5	7	10	20	34	-14							
