= Bruno Ramires =

Brazilian footballer (born 1994)

Personal information
- Full name: Bruno Edgar Silva Almeida
- Date of birth: 18 March 1994 (age 32)
- Place of birth: Salvador, Brazil
- Height: 1.90 m (6 ft 3 in)
- Positions: Centre-back; midfielder

Team information
- Current team: Amazonas

Youth career
- 2004–2006: Bahia
- 2007: Vitória
- 2007–2014: Cruzeiro
- 2008–2009: → Itaúna (loan)

Senior career*
| Years | Team | Apps | (Gls) |
| 2013–2018 | Cruzeiro | 23 | (0) |
| 2017 | → Vitória (loan) | 11 | (1) |
| 2017–2018 | → Moreirense (loan) | 17 | (0) |
| 2018 | → Ponte Preta (loan) | 6 | (1) |
| 2019 | CSA | 7 | (0) |
| 2019–2020 | Feirense | 15 | (2) |
| 2020–2021 | Belenenses | 32 | (1) |
| 2021–2023 | Bengaluru | 36 | (0) |
| 2023–2024 | Hong Linh Ha Tinh | 26 | (0) |
| 2024–2025 | Amazonas | 9 | (0) |
| 2025–2026 | Hapoel Haifa | 17 | (0) |
| 2026– | Amazonas | 0 | (0) |
- * Club domestic league appearances and goals as of 10 November 2026

Bruno Edgar Silva Almeida (born 18 March 1994), known as Bruno Ramires, is a Brazilian professional footballer who plays as a midfielder for Amazonas.

== Club career ==
=== Bengaluru ===
In August 2021, Indian Super League club Bengaluru confirmed the signing Ramires on a two-year deal.

On 20 November, he made his debut for the club against NorthEast United in the Indian Super League, which ended in a 4–2 win. He registered his first assist of the season against Chennaiyin on 30 December, in a 4–2 win. He cushioned the ball for Pratik Chaudhari to hit it into the back of the net from a Roshan Singh corner.

Ramires made his first appearance of the 2022–23 season on 17 August, in the Durand Cup in a 2–1 win over Jamshedpur at the Kishore Bharati Stadium. On 18 September, he was adjudged man of the match in the final against Mumbai City in a 2–1 win, which secured Bengaluru's first Durand Cup title.

=== Hong Linh Ha Tinh ===
In September 2023, Ramires signed for V.League 1 club Hong Linh Ha Tinh.

== Career statistics ==
As of match played 1 June 2025

Appearances and goals by club, season and competition
| Club | Season | League | | | State League | | National Cup (Note: Includes Copa do Brasil, Taça de Portugal, Super Cup and Vietnamese Cup) | | Other | | Total | |
| Club | Season | Division | Apps | Goals | Apps | Goals | Apps | Goals | Apps | Goals | Apps | Goals |
|---|---|---|---|---|---|---|---|---|---|---|---|---|
| Cruzeiro | 2014 | Série A | 1 | 0 | 0 | 0 | 0 | 0 | — | | 1 | 0 |
| Cruzeiro | 2015 | Série A | 3 | 0 | 2 | 0 | 0 | 0 | — | | 5 | 0 |
| Cruzeiro | 2016 | Série A | 16 | 0 | 1 | 0 | 4 | 1 | — | | 21 | 1 |
| Cruzeiro | Cruzeiro total | | 20 | 0 | 3 | 0 | 4 | 1 | 0 | 0 | 27 | 1 |
| Vitória (loan) | 2017 | Série A | 0 | 0 | 8 | 1 | 4 | 0 | 3 (Note: Appearances in Copa do Nordeste) | 0 | 15 | 1 |
| Moreirense (loan) | 2017–18 | Liga Portugal 1 | 17 | 0 | — | | 1 | 0 | 3 (Note: Appearances in Taça da Liga) | 0 | 20 | 0 |
| Ponte Preta (loan) | 2018 | Série B | 6 | 1 | — | | 0 | 0 | — | | 6 | 1 |
| CSA | 2019 | Série A | 3 | 0 | — | | 0 | 0 | 4 | 0 | 7 | 0 |
| Feirense | 2019–20 | LigaPro | 15 | 2 | — | | 1 | 0 | 0 | 0 | 16 | 2 |
| Belenenses | 2020–21 | Liga Portugal 1 | 32 | 1 | — | | 4 | 0 | — | | 36 | 1 |
| Bengaluru | 2021–22 | Indian Super League | 20 | 0 | — | | 0 | 0 | — | | 20 | 0 |
| Bengaluru | 2022–23 | Indian Super League | 16 | 0 | — | | 5 | 0 | 6 (Note: Appearances in Durand Cup) | 0 | 27 | 0 |
| Bengaluru | Bengaluru total | | 36 | 0 | 0 | 0 | 5 | 0 | 6 | 0 | 47 | 0 |
| Hong Linh Ha Tinh | 2023–24 | V.League 1 | 26 | 0 | — | | 2 | 0 | — | | 28 | 0 |
| Amazonas | 2025 | Campeonato Brasileiro Série B | 9 | 0 | — | | 1 | 0 | 2 | 0 | 12 | 0 |
| Hapoel Haifa | 2025–26 | Israeli Premier League | 0 | 0 | — | | 0 | 0 | — | | 0 | 0 |
| Career total | | | 164 | 4 | 11 | 1 | 22 | 1 | 18 | 0 | 209 | 6 |

== Honours ==
Cruzeiro

- Série A: 2014

Vitória

- Campeonato Baiano: 2017

Bengaluru

- Durand Cup: 2022
