= Slavko Damjanović =

Montenegrin footballer (born 1992)

Personal information
- Date of birth: 2 November 1992 (age 34)
- Place of birth: Nikšić, Montenegro, FR Yugoslavia
- Height: 1.89 m (6 ft 2 in)
- Position: Centre-back

Team information
- Current team: Persis Solo
- Number: 5

Senior career*
Years	Team	Apps	(Gls)
2009–2010	Čelik Nikšić		
2011	Mogren	0	(0)
2011–2012	Sutjeska Nikšić	0	(0)
2012	Mornar Bar	4	(0)
2013	Spartak Subotica	0	(0)
2013–2015	Bačka 1901		
2015–2016	Békéscsaba	20	(1)
2016–2017	Sutjeska Nikšić	25	(0)
2017	Bidvest Wits	3	(0)
2018–2019	Budućnost Podgorica	56	(3)
2020	Lokomotiv Tashkent	14	(0)
2020–2021	TSC	11	(1)
2021–2022	Chennaiyin	19	(2)
2022–2023	Novi Pazar	4	(0)
2023	Mohun Bagan	10	(1)
2023–2024	Bengaluru	16	(0)
2024–2025	Persebaya Surabaya	29	(0)
2025–2026	Bhayangkara Presisi	29	(3)
2026–	Persis Solo	1	(0)
- * Club domestic league appearances and goals as of 23:00, 13 September 2026 (UTC)

Slavko Damjanović (Montenegrin: Славко Дамјановић; born 2 November 1992) is a Montenegrin professional footballer who plays as a centre-back for Championship club Persis Solo.

== Career ==
Born in Nikšić, Montenegro, back then within FR Yugoslavia, Slavko Damjanović played with Montenegrin clubs FK Čelik Nikšić, FK Mogren, FK Sutjeska Nikšić and FK Mornar, before moving to Serbia and playing with FK Spartak Subotica and FK Bačka 1901. In summer 2015, he moved to Hungary and played with Békéscsaba 1912 Előre the entire season 2015–16 Nemzeti Bajnokság I. They finished the season 12th and ended relegated, thus Damjanović left Békéscsaba and returned to Montenegro where he signed with his former club FK Sutjeska Nikšić.

He was announced to have signed for South African club Bidvest Wits F.C. early July 2017 as a free agent, playing in the South African Premier Division. He then returned to Montenegro with Budućnost Podgorica before playing for Budućnost Podgorica of the Uzbekistan Super League and Serbian SuperLiga club Bačka Topola.

He was announced as new signing of the Indian Super League club Chennaiyin on 5 August 2021, where he is said to have penned a one-year deal.

In December 2022, Damjanović returned to India to sign for Mohun Bagan following a short spell back in Serbia with Novi Pazar.

On 25 June 2025, Damjanović officially signed for Liga 1 club Bhayangkara Presisi.

== Honours ==
Sutjeska

- Montenegrin Cup: 2017

Bidvest Wits

- Telkom Knockout: 2017

Budućnost

- Montenegrin Cup: 2019

Mohun Bagan

- Indian Super League Cup: 2022–23
