= Javi Hernández (footballer, born 1989) =

Spanish footballer

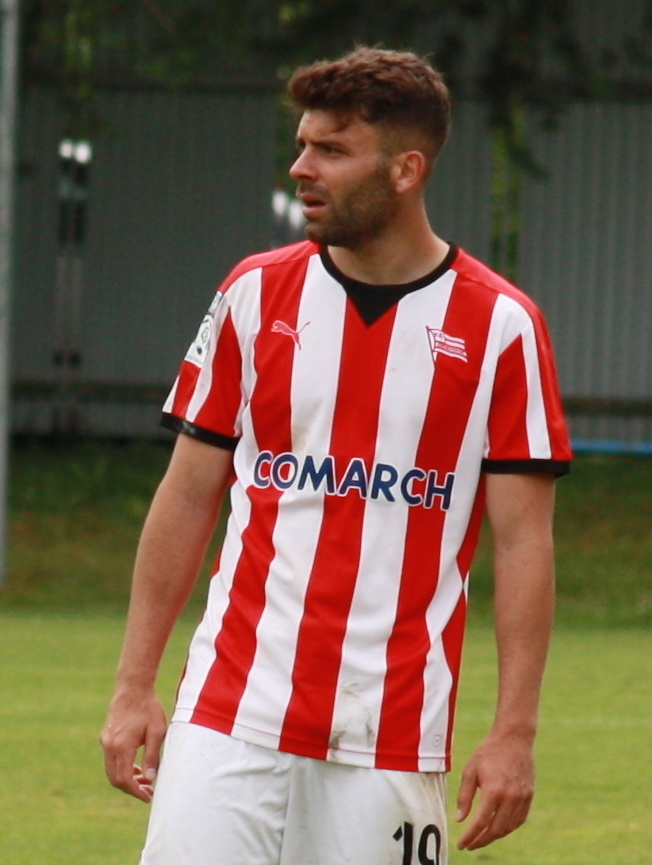
- Hernández with Cracovia in 2018

Personal information
- Full name: Francisco Javier Hernández González
- Date of birth: 6 June 1989 (age 37)
- Place of birth: Salamanca, Spain
- Height: 1.84 m (6 ft 0 in)
- Position: Attacking midfielder

Team information
- Current team: Alcalá

Youth career
- 1999–2002: CDF Pizarrales
- 2002–2005: Salamanca
- 2005–2008: Real Madrid

Senior career*
Years	Team	Apps	(Gls)
2008–2011	Real Madrid B	34	(3)
2011	→ Halmstad (loan)	8	(1)
2011–2013	Salamanca	56	(13)
2013–2014	Ourense	32	(5)
2014–2015	Burgos	35	(5)
2015–2016	Poli Timișoara	34	(5)
2016–2017	Górnik Łęczna	28	(4)
2017	Gabala	0	(0)
2017–2019	Cracovia	65	(15)
2019–2020	ATK	20	(2)
2020–2021	ATK Mohun Bagan	17	(1)
2021–2022	Odisha	19	(6)
2022–2024	Bengaluru	43	(12)
2024–2025	Jamshedpur	26	(9)
2025–	Alcalá	35	(10)

International career
2007	Spain U19	4	(1)
- * Club domestic league appearances and goals as of 16:21, 23 October 2026 (UTC)

Francisco Javier "Javi" Hernández González (born 6 June 1989) is a Spanish professional footballer who plays as an attacking midfielder for Segunda Federación club Alcalá.

== Club career ==
Born in Salamanca, Castile and León, Hernández reached Real Madrid's youth academy in 2005 at the age of 16, signing from local UD Salamanca. He made his senior debut in the 2008–09 season with Real Madrid Castilla in the Segunda División B, appearing in 24 games but only starting in three of those.

On 1 February 2011, after having totalled only ten league matches in one and a half seasons, Hernández was loaned to Halmstads BK in Sweden, alongside Castilla teammates Raúl Ruiz and José Zamora. He returned to his country in the summer, going on to continue competing in the third tier the following years with Salamanca, CD Ourense and Burgos CF.

On 31 August 2016, Hernández joined Górnik Łęczna. On 15 June 2017, he moved to Azerbaijan Premier League club Gabala FK on a one-year contract with an optional second year, but left shortly after and returned to the Polish Ekstraklasa with KS Cracovia.

In August 2019, Hernández signed a deal at ATK of the Indian Super League. He scored twice in his debut campaign to win the national championship, with both of his goals coming in the 3–1 final win over Chennaiyin FC.

After a merger, Hernández agreed to a one-year contract with the newly formed ATK Mohun Bagan FC on 30 September 2020. The following 30 July, he moved to Odisha FC of the same league on a one-year deal. He scored in the latter's first match of the season against Bengaluru FC (3–1 home victory), repeating the feat the following round – through a direct corner kick – as the hosts defeated SC East Bengal 6–4.

Hernández continued in the Indian top division in June 2022, on a two-year contract at Bengaluru. Once it expired, he signed for Jamshedpur FC also in that league.

On 7 July 2025, the 36-year-old Hernández returned to Spain ten years after leaving, joining Segunda Federación club RSD Alcalá.

== Personal life ==
Guti, who spent the majority of his professional career with Real Madrid, is Hernández's cousin.

== Career statistics ==
As of match played 3 May 2025

Appearances and goals by club, season and competition
Club	Season	League			National cup (Note: Includes Svenska Cupen, Copa del Rey, Cupa României, Polish Cup, Super Cup)		Continental		Other		Total	
Club	Season	Division	Apps	Goals	Apps	Goals	Apps	Goals	Apps	Goals	Apps	Goals
Real Madrid B	2008–09	Segunda División B	24	2	—		—		—		24	2
Real Madrid B	2009–10	Segunda División B	4	0	—		—		—		4	0
Real Madrid B	2010–11	Segunda División B	6	1	—		—		—		6	1
Real Madrid B	Total		34	3	0	0	0	0	0	0	34	3
Halmstad (loan)	2011	Allsvenskan	8	1	1	1	—		—		9	2
Salamanca	2011–12	Segunda División B	34	7	1	0	—		—		35	7
Salamanca	2012–13	Segunda División B	22	6	0	0	—		—		22	6
Salamanca	Total		56	13	1	0	0	0	0	0	57	13
Ourense	2013–14	Segunda División B	32	5	0	0	—		—		32	5
Burgos	2014–15	Segunda División B	35	5	0	0	—		—		35	5
Poli Timișoara	2015–16	Liga I	34	5	2	1	—		2 (Note: Appearances in Cupa Ligii)	0	38	6
Górnik Łęczna	2016–17	Ekstraklasa	28	4	0	0	—		—		28	4
Gabala	2017–18	Azerbaijan Premier League	0	0	0	0	1 (Note: Appearance in UEFA Europa League)	0	—		1	0
Cracovia	2017–18	Ekstraklasa	32	5	1	0	—		—		33	5
Cracovia	2018–19	Ekstraklasa	33	10	2	0	—		—		35	10
Cracovia	Total		65	15	3	0	0	0	0	0	68	15
ATK	2019–20	Indian Super League	20	2	—		—		—		20	2
ATK Mohun Bagan	2020–21	Indian Super League	17	1	—		—		—		17	1
Odisha	2021–22	Indian Super League	19	6	—		—		—		19	6
Bengaluru	2022–23	Indian Super League	22	7	4	2	—		3 (Note: Appearances in Durand Cup)	0	29	9
Bengaluru	2023–24	Indian Super League	21	5	3	1	—		0	0	24	6
Bengaluru	Total		43	12	7	3	—		3	0	53	15
Jamshedpur	2024–25	Indian Super League	26	9	4	0	—		0	0	30	9
Alcalá	2025–26	Segunda Federación	0	0	0	0	—		0	0	0	0
Career total			417	81	18	5	1	0	5	0	441	86

== Honours ==
ATK

- Indian Super League: 2019–20

Bengaluru

- Durand Cup: 2022
