= Alan Costa =

Brazilian footballer (born 1990)

Personal information
- Full name: Alan Henrique Costa
- Date of birth: 30 October 1990 (age 36)
- Place of birth: Araraquara, Brazil
- Height: 1.94 m (6 ft 4 1/2 in)
- Position: Centre-back

Team information
- Current team: Avaí
- Number: 5

Youth career
- 2007–2009: Ferroviária
- 2009: Palmeiras

Senior career*
| Years | Team | Apps | (Gls) |
| 2010–2011 | Ferroviária | 15 | (0) |
| 2010 | → São Bento (loan) | 10 | (0) |
| 2013–2018 | Internacional | 52 | (0) |
| 2017 | → Vitória (loan) | 25 | (2) |
| 2018–2019 | Coritiba | 35 | (3) |
| 2019–2020 | CSA | 46 | (3) |
| 2020– | Avaí | 53 | (3) |
| 2021–2023 | → Bengaluru (loan) | 36 | (4) |
- * Club domestic league appearances and goals as of 01:31, 27 March 2024 (UTC)

Alan Henrique Costa (born 30 October 1990) is a Brazilian professional footballer who plays as a centre-back for Avaí.

== Career ==
=== Ferroviária ===
Alan Costa made his league debut against União São João on 16 January 2011.

=== São Bento ===
Alan Costa made his league debut against América Futebol Clube (SP) on 14 January 2010.

=== Internacional ===
Alan Costa made his league debut against Cerâmica on 23 January 2013.

=== Vitória ===
Alan Costa made his league debut against Sergipe on 26 January 2017. He scored his first goal for the club against Botafogo PB on 12 March 2017, scoring in the 17th minute.

=== Coritiba ===
Alan Costa made his league debut against Maringá on 4 March 2018. He scored his first goal for the club against Foz do Iguaçu on 20 January 2019, scoring in the 44th minute.

=== CSA ===
Alan Costa made his league debut against Corinthians on 14 July 2019. He scored his first goal for the club against Cruzeiro on 29 November 2019, scoring in the 43rd minute.

=== Avaí ===
Alan Costa made his league debut against Grêmio Esportivo Brasil on 6 October 2020. He scored his first goal for the club against Guarani FC on 25 October 2020, scoring in the 86th minute.

=== Bengaluru ===
In July 2021, Costa moved to Indian Super League outfit Bengaluru on a two-year loan deal from Avaí. He debuted for the club on 15 August in a 1–0 win over Maldivian side Club Eagles, in 2021 AFC Cup playoffs. He later appeared in all three group stage matches against ATK Mohun Bagan, Bashundhara Kings and Maziya.

He made his Indian Super League debut on 20 November against NorthEast United in a 4–2 win. He scored his first league goal in the next match against Odisha on 24 November, but they lost by 3–1.

Costa made his first appearance of the 2022–23 season on 17 August, in the Durand Cup in a 2–1 win over Jamshedpur at the Kishore Bharati Stadium. On 18 September, he scored the winning goal in the final against Mumbai City in a 2–1 win, which helped Bengaluru win their first Durand Cup title. On 30 March 2023, Bengaluru confirmed that they have parted ways with Costa. The club stated he returned to Brazil citing personal reasons in a bid to be close to his family.

== Club statistics ==
=== Club ===
As of 18 March 2023

| Club | Season | League | | | Cup | | Continental | | Total | |
| Club | Season | Division | Apps | Goals | Apps | Goals | Apps | Goals | Apps | Goals |
|---|---|---|---|---|---|---|---|---|---|---|
| Ferroviária | 2011 | Paulista Série A2 | 15 | 0 | 0 | 0 | — | | 15 | 0 |
| São Bento (loan) | 2010 | Paulista Série A2 | 10 | 0 | 0 | 0 | — | | 10 | 0 |
| Internacional | 2013 | Série A | 8 | 0 | 2 (Note: Appearance(s) in Copa do Brasil) | 0 | — | | 10 | 0 |
| Internacional | 2014 | Série A | 10 | 0 | 0 | 0 | — | | 10 | 0 |
| Internacional | 2015 | Série A | 10 | 0 | 0 | 0 | 9 (Note: Appearance(s) in Copa Libertadores) | 0 | 19 | 0 |
| Internacional | 2016 | Série A | 5 | 0 | 3 | 0 | — | | 8 | 0 |
| Internacional | Internacional total | | 33 | 0 | 5 | 0 | 9 | 0 | 47 | 0 |
| Vitória (loan) | 2017 | Série A | 8 | 0 | 4 | 1 | — | | 12 | 1 |
| Coritiba | 2018 | Série B | 10 | 0 | 0 | 0 | — | | 10 | 0 |
| Coritiba | 2019 | Série B | 7 | 0 | 1 | 0 | — | | 8 | 0 |
| Coritiba | Coritiba total | | 17 | 0 | 1 | 0 | 0 | 0 | 18 | 0 |
| CSA | 2019 | Série A | 26 | 1 | 0 | 0 | — | | 26 | 1 |
| CSA | 2020 | Série B | 6 | 1 | 1 | 0 | — | | 7 | 1 |
| CSA | CSA total | | 32 | 2 | 1 | 0 | 0 | 0 | 33 | 2 |
| Avaí | 2020 | Série B | 20 | 2 | 0 | 0 | — | | 20 | 2 |
| Avaí | 2021 | Série B | 7 | 1 | 2 | 0 | — | | 9 | 1 |
| Avaí | Avaí total | | 27 | 3 | 2 | 0 | 0 | 0 | 29 | 3 |
| Bengaluru (loan) | 2021–22 | Indian Super League | 18 | 2 | 0 | 0 | 4 (Note: Appearance(s) in the AFC Cup) | 0 | 22 | 2 |
| Bengaluru (loan) | 2022–23 | Indian Super League | 18 | 2 | 4 (Note: Appearance(s) in Durand Cup) | 1 | — | | 22 | 3 |
| Bengaluru (loan) | Bengaluru total | | 36 | 4 | 4 | 1 | 4 | 0 | 44 | 5 |
| Career total | | | 178 | 9 | 17 | 2 | 13 | 0 | 208 | 11 |

== Honours ==
International

- Campeonato Gaúcho: 2013, 2014, 2015
- Recopa Gaúcha: 2016

Vitória

- Campeonato Baiano: 2017

Avaí

- Campeonato Catarinense: 2021

Bengaluru

- Durand Cup: 2022
