= Amrit Gope =

Indian footballer

Personal information
- Date of birth: 12 September 1999 (age 27)
- Place of birth: Jamshedpur, Bihar, (now-Jharkhand), India
- Height: 1.87 m (6 ft 1 1/2 in)
- Position: Goalkeeper

Team information
- Current team: Rajasthan United
- Number: 1

Youth career
- Hindustan
- Telco Sports Club

Senior career*
Years	Team	Apps	(Gls)
2017–2021	Jamshedpur B	12	(0)
2021–2022	TRAU	16	(0)
2022–2024	Bengaluru	0	(0)
2024–2026	Jamshedpur	0	(0)
2026–	Rajasthan United	0	(0)
- * Club domestic league appearances and goals as of 17:00, 4 May 2022 (UTC)

Amrit Gope (born 12 September 1999) is an Indian professional footballer who plays as a goalkeeper for Indian Football League club Rajasthan United

== Club career ==
=== Jamshedpur B ===
Gope, first tasted senior competitive football with Jamshedpur B in the 2018–19 season. On 13 January 2019, he made his debut for the reserve team, against TRAU, in a 1–0 loss. He played a combined 12 matches for them in the I-League 2nd Division, over two seasons.

Gope got promoted to the senior team ahead of the 2019–20 season, after impressive performances in between the sticks with the reserves team.

=== TRAU ===
Having worked his way up from the Jamshedpur B, Gope signed for TRAU on a one-year deal. On 9 January 2021, he made his debut for the club, against Aizawl in a 1–0 win, riding on some valiant goalkeeping. He saved a penalty from MC Malsawmzuala and received a yellow card but managed to kept a clean-sheet in a 1-0 win over Aizawl FC.

Gope extended his contract with TRAU ahead of the 2021–22 season. He played in nine matches and managed to keep three clean sheets throughout the season.

=== Bengaluru FC ===
He signed for the ISL club Bengaluru FC on a two-year deal. He made his debut in a 2-2 draw against FC Goa in durand cup but remained on the bench for rest of the tournament as Bengaluru won the final by defeating Mumbai City FC 2-1. He remained on the bench for the rest whole season as a backup for Gurpreet Singh Sandhu and played in no games for the first team. He moved to Bengaluru FC B and played in the first group stage game of I-League 2 against FC Bengaluru United but received a straight red in the 38th minute.

He was included in 2023 Durand Cup squad and played in a 2–2 draw against Kerala Blasters.

== Career statistics ==
=== Club ===
As of 30 August 2022

Club	Season	League			Cup		AFC		Total	
Club	Season	Division	Apps	Goals	Apps	Goals	Apps	Goals	Apps	Goals
Jamshedpur B	2018–19	I-League 2nd Division	9	0	0	0	–		9	0
Jamshedpur B	2019–20	I-League 2nd Division	3	0	3 (Note: Appearance(s) in Durand Cup)	0	–		6	0
TRAU	2020–21	I-League	7	0	0	0	–		7	0
TRAU	2021–22	I-League	9	0	0	0	–		9	0
TRAU	TRAU total		16	0	0	0	0	0	16	0
Bengaluru	2022–23	Indian Super League	0	0	1	0	–		0	0
Career total			28	0	4	0	0	0	32	0
