= Suresh Singh Wangjam =

Indian footballer (born 2000)

Suresh Singh
Personal information
- Full name: Suresh Singh Wangjam
- Date of birth: 7 August 2000 (age 26)
- Place of birth: Manipur, India
- Height: 1.66 m (5 ft 5 1/2 in)
- Position: Defensive midfielder

Team information
- Current team: Bengaluru
- Number: 8

Youth career
- 2016–2019: AIFF Elite Academy
- 2019: Bengaluru B

Senior career*
Years	Team	Apps	(Gls)
2017–2019	Indian Arrows	30	(0)
2019–	Bengaluru	100	(3)

International career^{‡}
2015–2017	India U17	30	(6)
2017	India U20	2	(2)
2021–	India U23	3	(0)
2021–	India	40	(1)
Medal record
Representing India
SAFF Championship
Winner	2021 Maldives
CAFA Nations Cup
Third place	2025 Tajikistan–Uzbekistan	Team
- * Club domestic league appearances and goals as of 20:53, 18 March 2025 (UTC) ‡ National team caps and goals as of 22:00, 18 November 2025 (UTC)

Suresh Singh Wangjam (born 7 August 2000) is an Indian professional footballer who plays as a midfielder for Indian Super League club Bengaluru and India national team. He won the 2020–21 AIFF Emerging Player of the Year award. He also represented India in the FIFA U-17 World Cup in 2017.

== Club career ==
Born in Manipur, and nicknamed as both El Torito and Gooli Suresha, Wangjam was part of the AIFF Elite Academy batch that was preparing for the 2017 FIFA U-17 World Cup to be hosted in India. After the tournament, Wangjam was selected to play for the Indian Arrows, an All India Football Federation-owned team that would consist of India under-20 players to give them playing time. He made his professional debut for the side in the Arrow's first match of the season against Chennai City. He started and played the whole match as Indian Arrows won 3–0.

== International career ==
Wangjam represented the India under-17 side which participated in the 2017 FIFA U-17 World Cup which was hosted in India.

He made his senior team debut on 25 March 2021 in an 1–1 draw match against Oman.

== Career statistics ==
=== Club ===
As of 18 March 2023

Club	Season	League			Cup		AFC		Other		Total	
Club	Season	Division	Apps	Goals	Apps	Goals	Apps	Goals	Apps	Goals	Apps	Goals
Indian Arrows	2017–18	I-League	15	0	0	0	—		—		15	0
Indian Arrows	2018–19	I-League	15	0	2 (Note: Appearance(s) in Super Cup)	0	—		—		17	0
Indian Arrows	Total		30	0	2	0	0	0	0	0	32	0
Bengaluru	2019–20	Indian Super League	11	0	0	0	3 (Note: Appearance(s) in AFC Cup)	0	3 (Note: Appearance(s) in Durand Cup)	3	17	3
Bengaluru	2020–21	Indian Super League	19	1	0	0	5	0	0	0	24	1
Bengaluru	2021–22	Indian Super League	16	0	0	0	—		0	0	16	0
Bengaluru	2022–23	Indian Super League	22	0	5	0	—		3	0	30	0
Bengaluru	2023–24	Indian Super League	19	1	0	0	—		0	0	19	1
Bengaluru	2024–25	Indian Super League	13	1	0	0	—		3	0	16	1
Bengaluru	Total		100	3	5	0	8	0	9	3	122	6
Career total			130	3	7	0	8	0	9	3	154	6

=== International ===
As of 18 November 2025

National team	Year	Apps	Goals
India	2021	11	1
India	2022	4	0
India	2023	7	0
India	2024	9	0
India	2025	9	0
Total		40	1

==== International goals ====
Scores and results list India's goal tally first

No.	Date	Venue	Cap	Opponent	Score	Result	Competition
1.	16 October 2021	National Football Stadium, Malé, Maldives	11	Nepal	2–0	3–0	2021 SAFF Championship Final

== Honours ==
India

- SAFF Championship: 2021, 2026
- Tri-Nation Series: 2023

Individual

- AIFF Emerging Player of the Year: 2020–21

Bengaluru FC

- Durand Cup: 2022
- ISL Cup runner-up: 2022–23, 2024–25
- Super Cup runner-up: 2023
