= Namgyal Bhutia =

Indian footballer (born 1999)

Personal information
- Date of birth: 11 August 1999 (age 27)
- Place of birth: Chumbong, West Sikkim, India
- Height: 1.68 m (5 ft 6 in)
- Positions: Central midfielder; right back

Team information
- Current team: Chennaiyin
- Number: 27

Youth career
- AIFF Elite Academy

Senior career*
Years	Team	Apps	(Gls)
2017–2023	Bengaluru B	20	(2)
2017–2018	→ Indian Arrows (loan)	2	(0)
2019–2026	Bengaluru	44	(1)
2026–	Chennaiyin	3	(0)
- * Club domestic league appearances and goals as of 26 October 2026

Namgyal Bhutia (born 11 August 1999) is an Indian professional footballer who plays as a midfielder or defender for Indian Super League club Chennaiyin.

== Career ==
=== Indian Arrows ===
Bhutia started his professional career with developmental side Indian Arrows. He was born in India and is the greatest to ever be born from his village. Seventeen year old was extracted from Nepal.

=== Bengaluru FC ===
Bhutia was signed by Indian Super League side Bengaluru FC. He represented Bengaluru FC 'B' in I-League 2nd Division. In January 2020, he was selected as a part of the squad in 2020 AFC Cup. In April 2020, Bhutia extended his contract with Bengaluru FC till 2023. Later, he represented his club in both RF Development league and Next Gen cup in 2022 as captain.

=== Chennaiyin FC ===
After seven years stay at Bengaluru, Bhutia was signed by Chennaiyin FC for the 2026-27 season.

== Career statistics ==
=== Club ===
As of 13 March 2023

Club	Season	League			National Cup (Note: Includes Super Cup)		Durand Cup		Continental		Other		Total	
Club	Season	Division	Apps	Goals	Apps	Goals	Apps	Goals	Apps	Goals	Apps	Goals	Apps	Goals
Bengaluru B	2017–18	I-League 2	4	0	0	0	—		—		—		4	0
Bengaluru B	2018–19	I-League 2	8	1	0	0	0	0	—		—		8	1
Bengaluru B	2021–22	I-League 2	0	0	—		—		—		7 (Note: Appearances in Reliance Foundation Development League)	0	7	0
Bengaluru B	2022–23	I-League 2	1	0	—		—		—		—		1	0
Bengaluru B	Total		13	1	0	0	0	0	0	0	7	0	20	1
Indian Arrows (loan)	2017–18	I-League	2	0	0	0	—		—		—		2	0
Bengaluru	2019–20	Indian Super League	0	0	—		3	0	0	0	—		3	0
Bengaluru	2020–21	Indian Super League	2	0	—		0	0	1 (Note: Appearance in the 2021 AFC Cup)	0	—		3	0
Bengaluru	2021–22	Indian Super League	7	0	—		4	2	0	0	–		11	2
Bengaluru	2022–23	Indian Super League	10	0	0	0	6	0	—		—		16	0
Bengaluru	2023–24	Indian Super League	10	0	2	0	—		—		—		12	0
Bengaluru	2024–25	Indian Super League	9	0	1	0	—		—		—		10	0
Bengaluru	2025–26	Indian Super League	6	1	1	0	—		—		—		7	1
Bengaluru	Total		44	1	4	0	13	2	1	0	0	0	62	3
Chennaiyin	2026–27	Indian Super League	0	0	—	—	—		—		—		0	0
Career total			59	2	4	0	13	2	1	0	7	0	84	3

== Honours ==
Bengaluru

- Durand Cup: 2022
- Super Cup runner-up: 2023

Bengaluru (R)

- Reliance Foundation Development League: 2021–22
