= Aleksandar Jovanović (soccer, born 1989) =

Australian soccer player (born 1989)

Personal information
- Date of birth: 4 August 1989 (age 37)
- Place of birth: Sydney, Australia
- Height: 1.96 m (6 ft 5 in)
- Position: Centre-back

Youth career
- APIA Leichhardt

Senior career*
Years	Team	Apps	(Gls)
2006–2007	Parramatta	5	(0)
2008–2011	Vojvodina	2	(0)
2008	→ Palić (loan)	3	(0)
2009	→ Veternik (loan)	13	(0)
2009–2011	→ Novi Sad (loan)	35	(1)
2011	Hajduk Kula	7	(0)
2012	Police Tero		
2013	Suwon	24	(0)
2014–2015	Jeju United	53	(1)
2016	Tianjin TEDA	23	(2)
2017–2019	Jeju United	51	(2)
2020	Željezničar	1	(0)
2020–2022	Macarthur	33	(1)
2022–2025	Bengaluru	60	(0)
Total		287	(7)
- * Club domestic league appearances and goals as of 23 April 2025

Aleksandar Jovanović (Serbian Cyrillic: Александар Јовановић, pronounced [aleksǎːndar jǒʋanoʋitɕ, alěksaːn-, – joʋǎːn-]; born 4 August 1989) is a former Australian professional soccer player who played as a centre-back. Born in Sydney, he also holds Serbian citizenship.

== Career ==
After playing in the Endeavour Sports High School team, Jovanović played with Parramatta in Australia before signing in January 2008 with Serbian SuperLiga club Vojvodina. Because of his youth he failed to make any league appearance that season and in the following one, while in the 2008–09 season, he was loaned to lower league neighbouring clubs Palić and Veternik.

In the summer of 2009, Vojvodina loaned Jovanović to Serbian First League club Novi Sad, where he stayed for a season and a half, becoming a regular player and making a total of 35 league appearances and even scoring one goal.

In the summer of 2011, he left Vojvodina and signed with another Serbian top league club, Hajduk Kula. He made his Serbian SuperLiga debut on 25 September 2011, in for the 2013 K League 2 in South Korea. After one season he moved up a division to K League 1 side Jeju United for the 2014 season.

On 6 February 2016, Jovanović transferred to Chinese Super League side Tianjin Teda. In February 2017, he came back to South Korea and once again joined Jeju United, being a regular in the club ever since. He left Jeju in January 2020, after his contract expired.

On 14 January 2020, Jovanović signed a six-month contract with a possibility of an extension with Bosnian Premier League club Željezničar. He made his official debut for the club in a 0–0 league draw against Radnik Bijeljina on 22 February 2020. Jovanović left Željezničar in July 2020.

On 13 October 2020 he joined Macarthur.

On 22 July 2022, he joined Indian Super League club Bengaluru.

== Career statistics ==
As of 23 April 2025

Appearances and goals by club, season and competition
Club	Season	League			National cup (Note: Includes Serbian Cup, Korean FA Cup, Bosnian Cup, Super Cup)		Continental		Others		Total	
Club	Season	Division	Apps	Goals	Apps	Goals	Apps	Goals	Apps	Goals	Apps	Goals
Vojvodina	2008–09	Serbian SuperLiga	0	0	0	0	—		—		0	0
Novi Sad (loan)	2009–10	Serbian First League	27	1	0	0	—		—		27	1
Novi Sad (loan)	2009–10	Serbian First League	8	0	0	0	—		—		8	0
Novi Sad (loan)	Total		35	1	0	0	0	0	—		35	1
Hajduk Kula	2011–12	Serbian SuperLiga	7	0	1	0	—		—		8	0
Suwon	2013	K League Challenge	24	0	2	0	—		—		26	0
Jeju United	2014	K League 1	31	1	0	0	—		—		31	1
Jeju United	2015	K League 1	22	0	2	0	—		—		24	0
Jeju United	Total		53	1	2	0	0	0	—		55	1
Tianjin TEDA	2016	Chinese Super League	23	2	0	0	—		—		23	2
Jeju United	2017	K League 1	12	1	2	0	4 (Note: Appearance(s) in AFC Champions League)	0	—		18	1
Jeju United	2018	K League 1	16	1	1	0	1	0	—		18	1
Jeju United	2019	K League 1	23	0	1	0	—		—		24	0
Jeju United	Total		51	2	4	0	5	0	—		60	2
Željezničar	2019–20	Premijer Liga	1	0	1	0	—		—		2	0
Macarthur	2020–21	A-League	13	1	0	0	—		—		13	1
Macarthur	2021–22	A-League	20	0	1	1	—		—		21	1
Macarthur	Total		33	1	1	1	0	0	—		34	2
Bengaluru	2022–23	Indian Super League	17	0	2	0	—		6 (Note: Appearances in Durand Cup)	0	25	0
Bengaluru	2023–24	Indian Super League	20	0	3	0	—		—		23	0
Bengaluru	2024–25	Indian Super League	23	0	1	0	—		5	1	29	1
Bengaluru	Total		60	0	6	0	0	0	11	1	77	1
Career total			287	7	17	1	5	0	11	1	320	9

== Honours ==
Bengaluru

- ISL Cup runner-up: 2022–23, 2024–25
- Durand Cup: 2022
- Super Cup runner-up: 2023
