= Parag Shrivas =

Indian footballer

Personal information
- Full name: Parag Satish Shrivas
- Date of birth: 9 June 1997 (age 29)
- Place of birth: Amravati, Maharastra, India
- Height: 1.80 m (5 ft 11 in)
- Positions: Right back; centre-back

Team information
- Current team: Churchill Brothers
- Number: 24

Youth career
- Kalyani Bharat

Senior career*
Years	Team	Apps	(Gls)
2016–2017	Pride Sports	5	(0)
2017–2019	Bengaluru B	15	(6)
2019–2024	Bengaluru	49	(0)
2024–2025	Hyderabad	16	(1)
2026–	Churchill Brothers	0	(0)
- * Club domestic league appearances and goals as of 12:56, 6 March 2025 (UTC)

Parag Satish Shrivas (born 9 June 1997) is an Indian professional footballer who plays as a defender for Indian Super League club Churchill Brothers.

== Career ==
Born in Maharashtra, Shrivas was motivated to play football from the age of seven. In July 2013, Shrivas was selected to represent India after winning the zonal competition of the Bajaj Allianz Junior Football Camp. He was selected among over 3,000 players.

On 13 October 2017, it was announced that Shrivas would join the inaugural squad for Bengaluru B, the reserve side of Indian Super League club, Bengaluru. Later, on 27 February 2019, Shrivas was called up to Bengaluru's first team for their league match against Jamshedpur. He came on to make his professional debut in the 57th minute as Bengaluru lost 5–1. At the end of the season, Shrivas was named the Bengaluru B Player of the Season.

== Career statistics ==
=== Club ===
As of 26 October 2024

Club	Season	League			Cup		AFC		Total	
Club	Season	Division	Apps	Goals	Apps	Goals	Apps	Goals	Apps	Goals
Pride Sports	2016–17	I-League 2nd Division	5	0	0	0	—		5	0
Bengaluru B	2017–18	I-League 2nd Division	8	4	0	0	—		8	4
Bengaluru B	2018–19	I-League 2nd Division	6	2	0	0	—		6	2
Bengaluru B	2019–20	I-League 2nd Division	1	0	0	0	—		1	0
Bengaluru B	Total		15	6	0	0	0	0	15	6
Bengaluru	2018–19	Indian Super League	1	0	0	0	—		1	0
Bengaluru	2019–20	Indian Super League	1	0	3 (Note: Appearance(s) in Durand Cup)	0	3 (Note: Appearance(s) in AFC Cup)	0	7	0
Bengaluru	2020–21	Indian Super League	11	0	0	0	2	0	13	0
Bengaluru	2021–22	Indian Super League	14	0	5	0	—		19	0
Bengaluru	2022–23	Indian Super League	19	0	10 (Note: Appearance(s) in Super Cup)	0	—		29	0
Bengaluru	2023–24	Indian Super League	3	0	3	0	—		6	0
Bengaluru	Total		49	0	21	0	5	0	75	0
Hyderabad	2024–25	Indian Super League	4	1	0	0	—		4	1
Career totat			73	7	21	0	5	0	99	7

== Honours ==
Bengaluru

- Durand Cup: 2022
