= Prabir Das =

Indian footballer (born 1993)

Personal information
- Date of birth: 20 December 1993 (age 32)
- Place of birth: Sodepur, West Bengal, India
- Height: 1.71 m (5 ft 7 in)
- Position: Right-back

Senior career*
Years	Team	Apps	(Gls)
2012–2013	Pailan Arrows	24	(1)
2013–2015	Dempo	10	(0)
2014	→ Goa (loan)	1	(0)
2015	→ Delhi Dynamos (loan)	0	(0)
2015–2017	Mohun Bagan	26	(1)
2016	→ ATK (loan)	12	(0)
2017–2020	ATK	34	(0)
2020–2022	Mohun Bagan	39	(0)
2022–2023	Bengaluru	20	(0)
2023–2025	Kerala Blasters	9	(0)
2025	→ Mumbai City (loan)	5	(0)
2025	Inter Kashi	5	(0)
Total		185	(2)

International career^{‡}
2011	India U19	3	(1)
2015	India U23	2	(0)
- * Club domestic league appearances and goals as of 08:30, 15 September 2026 (UTC) ‡ National team caps and goals as of 06:00, 1 April 2022 (UTC)

Prabir Das (Bengali: প্রবীর দাস; born 20 December 1993) is a former Indian professional footballer who played as a right-back for various Indian Super League and Indian Football League clubs.

== Club career ==
=== Pailan Arrows ===
On 23 September 2012 Das scored his first goal for Pailan Arrows in the 2012 Indian Federation Cup against Shillong Lajong at the Keenan Stadium in the 69th minute to give Pailan the victory 2–1. He then scored his first I-League goal for Pailan Arrows and the second goal of his career again against Shillong Lajong at the Salt Lake Stadium in which he scored in the 39th minute to give Pailan Arrows the eventual 1–0.

On 12 April 2013, during a game versus Prayag United, Das collapsed on the pitch due to heatstroke. It was 37 degrees Celsius when Das fell and had to be taken away via ambulance to the nearest hospital. He had breathing problems which resulted in immediate care.

=== Dempo ===
On 15 November 2013, Das joined Goan giant Dempo SC from Pailan Arrows for a one-year deal on loan. He made his debut for Dempo in the I-League on 27 November 2013 against Pune F.C. at the Duler Stadium in which he played the whole match as Dempo drew the match 1-1.

=== Mohun Bagan ===
On 13 June 2015 Das signed a two-year contract with Mohun Bagan.

==== Delhi Dynamos (loan) ====
In July 2015 Das was drafted to play for Delhi Dynamos in the 2015 Indian Super League.

==== ATK (loan) ====
In July 2016, Das signed for former ISL champion Atletico de Kolkata on loan from Mohun Bagan. He was the instrumental part of ATK squad which lifted the 2016 ISL trophy.

=== ATK ===
On 5 July 2017, Das was retained by ATKand have him a three-year contract extension. In the 2019–20 season, Das recorded the joint-highest assists by a defender with five, eventually winning the title with ATK.

=== Bengaluru ===
In 2022, Das joined Bengaluru FC in a swap deal with Ashique Kuruniyan who joined ATK Mohun Bagan. Das made 20 appearances for the club during the season.

=== Kerala Blasters FC ===
After winning 2022 Durand Cup, with Bengaluru FC, ahead of the 2023–24 season, Das signed for their rivals Kerala Blasters FC on a three-year deal on 1 June 2023 until 2026. He made his debut as well as scored first goal for the club on 13 August 2023 in a 4–3 loss against Gokulam Kerala in the 2023 Durand Cup. On 21 September, Das made his debut for the club in the Indian Super League, in the season opener against Bengaluru FC at home, which the Blasters won 2–1. After the Kerala Blasters' 2–1 loss against Mumbai City on 8 October, Das was handed over a three match suspension after the AIFF disciplinary committee's report cited Prabir's aggressive actions against a referee during the game. However his suspension led to some controversy as it was alleged that Prabir's actions were accidental, and that he was entangled in a brawl with a Mumbai City FC player at the time.

=== Mumbai City FC (loan) ===
On 2 January 2025, Mumbai City FC signed Das on a 6-month loan, valid until the end of the season. He made his debut away against East Bengal FC, coming on during stoppage time as a substitute for Bipin Singh and helping his new team secure a 3–2 win away from home.

== International career ==
=== India U19 ===
Das made his debut for the India U19s on 31 October 2011 during the 2012 AFC U-19 Championship qualifiers against Turkmenistan in which he also scored in the 82nd minute to confirm India's 3–1 victory to open the qualifiers.

=== India U23 ===
On 29 March 2015, Das has made his debut for India U23 against Syria in AFC U23 Championship Qualifier.

== Personal life ==
Apart from his football career, Das also has his official YouTube channel, named Prabir Das Lifestyle, which is having over 161 thousand subscribers and 11 million views.

In December 2019, he extended financial support for a young East Bengal fan's treatment.

He has been in relationship with Indian Bengali actress Geetashree Roy.

On 15 September 2026, Das announced his retirement from football via Instagram.

== Career statistics ==
=== Club ===
As of matches finished till 25 October 2025

Club	Season	League			Cup		AFC		Total	
Club	Season	Division	Apps	Goals	Apps	Goals	Apps	Goals	Apps	Goals
Pailan Arrows	2012–13	I-League	24	1	0	0	—		24	1
Pailan Arrows	Pailan Arrows total		24	1	0	0	0	0	24	1
Dempo	2013–14	I-League	9	0	0	0	—		9	0
Dempo	2014–15	I-League	1	0	0	0	—		1	0
Dempo	Dempo total		10	0	0	0	0	0	10	0
Goa (loan)	2014	Indian Super League	1	0	0	0	—		1	0
Goa (loan)	FC Goa total		1	0	0	0	0	0	1	0
Delhi Dynamos (loan)	2015	Indian Super League	0	0	0	0	—		0	0
Delhi Dynamos (loan)	Delhi Dynamos total		0	0	0	0	0	0	0	0
Mohun Bagan	2015–16	I-League	12	0	0	0	6 (Note: Appearance(s) in AFC Champions League) (Note: Appearance(s) in AFC Cup)	0	18	0
Mohun Bagan	2016–17	I-League	14	1	4 (Note: Appearance(s) in Federation Cup)	0	7	0	25	1
Mohun Bagan	2020–21	Indian Super League	20	0	0	0	—		20	0
Mohun Bagan	2021–22	Indian Super League	19	0	0	0	5	0	24	0
Mohun Bagan	Mohun Bagan total		65	1	4	0	18	0	87	1
ATK (loan)	2016	Indian Super League	12	0	0	0	—		12	0
ATK (loan)	2017–18	Indian Super League	14	0	2 (Note: Appearance(s) in Super Cup)	0	—		16	0
ATK (loan)	2019–20	Indian Super League	20	0	3 (Note: Appearance(s) in Durand Cup)	1	—		23	1
ATK (loan)	ATK total		46	0	5	1	0	0	51	1
Bengaluru	2022–23	Indian Super League	20	0	9	0	—		29	0
Bengaluru	Bengaluru FC total		20	0	9	0	0	0	29	0
Kerala Blasters FC	2023–24	Indian Super League	8	0	5 (Note: Three appearances in the 2023 Durand Cup, Two appearances in the 2024 Super Cup)	1 (Note: One goal in the 2023 Durand Cup)	—		13	1
Kerala Blasters FC	2024–25	Indian Super League	1	0	—				1	0
Kerala Blasters FC	Kerala Blasters FC total		9	0	5	1	0	0	14	1
Mumbai City FC (loan)	2024–25	Indian Super League	5	0	—				5	0
Mumbai City FC (loan)	Mumbai City FC total		5	0	0	0	0	0	5	0
Inter Kashi	2025-26	Indian Super League								
Inter Kashi	Inter Kashi total									
Career total			180	2	23	2	18	0	221	4

== Honours ==
Mohun Bagan

- I-League: 2014–15
- Federation Cup: 2015–16

ATK

- Indian Super League: 2016, 2019–20

Bengaluru

- Durand Cup: 2022
