= Roshan Singh Naorem =

Indian footballer (born 1999)

Roshan Singh
Personal information
- Full name: Roshan Singh Naorem
- Date of birth: 2 February 1999 (age 27)
- Place of birth: Samurou, Manipur, India
- Height: 1.73 m (5 ft 8 in)
- Positions: Left back; winger

Team information
- Current team: Bengaluru
- Number: 32

Youth career
- Bengaluru

Senior career*
Years	Team	Apps	(Gls)
2017–2020	Bengaluru B	18	(7)
2017–2018	→ Indian Arrows (loan)	3	(0)
2019–	Bengaluru	90	(2)

International career^{‡}
2017	India U20	3	(0)
2022–	India	19	(0)
Medal record
Representing India
CAFA Nations Cup
Third place	2025 Tajikistan–Uzbekistan	Team
- * Club domestic league appearances and goals as of 16:30, 18 March 2023 (UTC) ‡ National team caps and goals as of 20:00, 9 June 2026 (UTC)

Roshan Singh Naorem (Meitei: Naorem Roshan Singh, born 2 February 1999) is an Indian professional footballer who plays as a defender or winger for Indian Super League club Bengaluru and the India national team.

== Club career ==
In October 2017, it was announced that Roshan had joined Bengaluru's reserve team for the I-League 2nd Division. A month later, he was loaned to Indian Arrows, an All India Football Federation-owned team that would consist of India under-20 players to allow them playing time. He made his professional debut for the side 5 December 2017 against Minerva Punjab, coming on as an 80th-minute substitute for Edmund Lalrindika as Indian Arrows lost 2–0. Roshan was also part of the Bengaluru B that participated in Bangalore Super Division league, where he also captained them.

Roshan was included in the senior team of Bengaluru for the 2019–20 Indian Super League season under coach Naushad Moosa but would split time between playing for the senior team and the B team in the I-League 2nd Division. Roshan appeared as the left sided-midfielder where he showed glimpses of his talent during the 2019 Durand Cup and appearance in the 2019 AFC Cup, where they bowed out of the group stages. His second season with Bengaluru would see him make his debut for the senior team in the Indian Super League, and make 5 appearances in the 2020 AFC Cup.

Roshan entered his third season at Bengaluru as a full back, where he would play both left and right side due to his two-footed nature. He made 5 appearances in the 2021 Durand Cup but Bengaluru would be eliminated in the semi-final stage by Goa. On 30 January 2022, he scored his first goal from a direct free-kick in the 56th minute as Bengaluru defeated 10-match unbeaten Kerala Blasters 1–0. He would finish the season with a goal and 7 assists from 17 appearances from full-back position for the 2021–22 Indian Super League season culminating in a national team call-up for friendlies against Bahrain and Belarus.

== International career ==
In March 2022, Roshan was called up for the national squad by coach Igor Štimac ahead of India's two friendly matches against Bahrain and Belarus. He made his debut on 23 March against Bahrain in their 2–1 defeat, in which he assisted the goal.

== Career statistics ==
=== Club ===
As of 18 March 2023

Club	Season	League			Cup		AFC		Total	
Club	Season	Division	Apps	Goals	Apps	Goals	Apps	Goals	Apps	Goals
Bengaluru B	2017–18	I-League 2	7	2	0	0	–		7	2
Bengaluru B	2018–19	I-League 2	8	5	0	0	–		8	5
Bengaluru B	2019–20	I-League 2	3	0	0	0	–		3	0
Bengaluru B	Total		18	7	0	0	0	0	18	7
Indian Arrows (loan)	2017–18	I-League	3	0	0	0	–		3	0
Bengaluru	2019–20	Indian Super League	0	0	3 (Note: Appearance(s) in Durand Cup)	0	1 (Note: Appearance(s) in AFC Cup)	0	4	0
Bengaluru	2020–21	Indian Super League	2	0	0	0	1	0	3	0
Bengaluru	2021–22	Indian Super League	17	1	5	0	4	0	26	1
Bengaluru	2022–23	Indian Super League	24	0	3	0	–		27	0
Bengaluru	2023–24	Indian Super League	20	0	0	0	–		20	0
Bengaluru	2024–25	Indian Super League	28	1	0	0	–		28	1
Bengaluru	Total		91	2	11	0	6	0	108	2
Career total			112	9	11	0	6	0	129	9

=== International ===
As of 9 June 2026

National team	Year	Apps	Goals
India	2022	7	0
India	2023	4	0
India	2024	2	0
India	2025	3	0
India	2026	3	0
Total		19	0

== Honours ==
India

- Tri-Nation Series: 2023

Bengaluru

- Durand Cup: 2022

Bengaluru FC B

- Bangalore Super Division: 2018–19, 2019–20

Individual

- Indian Super League Emerging Player of the Season: 2021–22
