= Faisal Ali (footballer) =

Indian footballer (born 1999)

Personal information
- Date of birth: 20 October 1999 (age 27)
- Place of birth: Kolkata, India
- Height: 1.81 m (5 ft 11 in)
- Positions: Attacking midfielder; winger

Team information
- Current team: Thrissur Magic

Youth career
- Kolkata Football Academy
- Southern Samity

Senior career*
Years	Team	Apps	(Gls)
2020	Bhawanipore	7	(0)
2020–2022	Mohammedan	28	(5)
2022–2023	Bengaluru	3	(1)
2023	→ Mohammedan (loan)	11	(1)
2023–2024	Churchill Brothers	7	(2)
2025–	Thrissur Magic		
- * Club domestic league appearances and goals as of 21:34, 11 March 2023 (UTC)

Faisal Ali (Bengali: ফয়সাল আলী; born 20 October 1999) is an Indian professional footballer who plays as an attacking midfielder or winger for the Super League Kerala club Thrissur Magic.

== Career ==
=== Early career ===
Born in India, Faisal Ali started his professional football career with Bhawanipore FC. He was also part of Bhawanipore which played in I-League Qualifiers which held in October 2020.

=== Mohammedan SC ===
On 7 November 2020, Faisal joined I-league club Mohammedan SC on a 2-year deal. On 9 January 2021, Faisal made his debut for Mohammedan and in 58th minute he scored his first goal for the club.

== Career statistics ==
=== Club ===
As of 5 April 2023

Club	Season	League			Cup		AFC		Total	
Club	Season	Division	Apps	Goals	Apps	Goals	Apps	Goals	Apps	Goals
Bhawanipore	2020	I-League 2nd Division	7	0	0	0	–		7	0
Mohammedan	2020–21	I-League	12	2	0	0	–		12	2
Mohammedan	2021–22	I-League	16	3	6 (Note: Appearance(s) in Durand Cup)	1	–		22	4
Mohammedan	Mohammedan total		28	5	6	1	0	0	34	6
Bengaluru	2022–23	Indian Super League	0	0	5	1	–		5	1
Bengaluru	2023–24	Indian Super League	0	0	0	0	–		0	0
Bengaluru	Bengaluru total		0	0	5	1	0	0	5	1
Mohammedan (loan)	2022–23	I-League	11	1	1 (Note: Appearance(s) in Super Cup)	0	–		12	1
Career total			46	6	12	2	0	0	58	8

== Honours ==
Mohammedan Sporting

- Calcutta Football League: 2021
- I-League: 2021–22

Bengaluru

- Durand Cup: 2022
