= 2026–27 Bengaluru FC season =

14th season in the existence of Bengaluru FC

Bengaluru FC
2026–27 season
- Sree Kanteerava on an ISL matchday.
- Chairman: Sajjan Jindal
- Manager: Pep Muñoz
- Stadium: Sree Kanteerava Stadium
- Indian Super League: 1st
- Super Cup: TBD
- Durand Cup: Did not participate
- Top goalscorer: (Spain) Borja Martínez (4 goals)
- Highest home attendance: 10,623
- Lowest home attendance: 10,211
- Average home league attendance: 10,349
- Biggest win: 3–2 vs SC Delhi
Home colours	Away colours	Third colours
- All statistics correct as of 20 November 2026.

The 2026–27 season is Bengaluru FC's 14th season as a professional football club since its establishment in 2013 and 9th season in the Indian Super League. It runs from 1 June 2026 to 31 May 2027 with participation in the Indian Super League and Super Cup.

Bengaluru began their month long pre-season training in late July at Ballari's Inspire Institute of Sport. Head coach Pep Muñoz's camp was joined by four new foreign signings during the training.

== Background ==
In the truncated previous season, the Blues had a positive start to their ISL campaign with four wins in seven games, losing just once under the helm of Renedy Singh. The former India international had taken charge of the first team post departure of Gerard Zaragoza, who parted ways after Bengaluru failed to make it past the group stage of Super Cup and owing to uncertainty of the league's commencement. However, the Blues would eventually lose the momentum after a mid-season change in staff with Renedy making way for Pep Muñoz. With just two wins in their remaining six games, Bengaluru finished fourth in the truncated single-round-robin league.

In an unfortunate incident, former Bengaluru FC player Yrondu Musavu-King who had represented the club in the 2020–21 and 2021–22 seasons, passed away on 5 June 2026 aged 34. The club and its supporters mourned the loss. On 18 June 2026, Rahul Bheke parted ways with the club and joined Mohun Bagan Super Giant.

Following Bheke were foreign midfielders Braian Sánchez and Sirojiddin Kuziev, both departing the club on 7 July 2026, which left the Blues with a fresh slate of foreign slots. The next day on 8th July, Namgyal Bhutia who began his career at Bengaluru FC back in 2017 for the club's Reserves side, bid adieu to his seven year stint and joined Chennaiyin FC. Defender Mohamed Salah and goalkeeper Jaspreet Singh were also among the departees.

Sandro Embaló was announced as the season's first foreign recruit on 15 July 2026. The 30-year-old portuguese centre-back was signed to strengthen Bengaluru's backline. On 20 July 2026, Spaniard and former Elche CF winger Borja Martínez was announced as the second foreign signing of the season. For the midfield, Bengaluru welcomed Manuel de Iriondo, the Argentine defensive-midfielder who had previously played in the French Ligue 2 for Grenoble. Later on 19th August, Montenegrin forward Mihailo Perović was named as the club's new target man in the frontline. The 29-year-old has seven games and a goal under his belt for Montengro national team.

On 27 August 2026, Bengaluru added Dutch centre-back Menno Koch as their fifth foreign signing. The 32-year-old joined the club after a two-season stint in the Norweign top division league for Sarpsborg 08 FF.

Among contract extensions were defender Harsh Palande and midfielder Vinith Venkatesh who penned extensions until the end of 2028–29 season. While Soham Varshneya extended a season more until the end of 2028–29. Sunil Chhetri also extended his contract until the end of the season, thus confirming his participation.

=== Transfers in ===
No.	Position	Player	Previous club	Date	Fee	Ref
	DF	(Portugal) Sandro Sakho	(Indonesia) PSBS Biak	15 July 2026	Free	
	FW	(Spain) Borja Martínez	(Spain) AD Alcorcón	20 July 2026	Free	
	MF	(Argentina) Manuel de Iriondo	(Cyprus) Krasava ENY Ypsonas FC	30 July 2026	Free	
	FW	(Montenegro) Mihailo Perović	(Indonesia) Persebaya Surabaya	19 August 2026	Free	
	DF	(Netherlands) Menno Koch	(Norway) Sarpsborg 08 FF	27 August 2026	Free	
Total transfers in				5		

=== Transfers out ===
No.	Position	Player	Outgoing club	Date	Fee	Ref
2	DF	(India) Rahul Bheke	(India) Mohun Bagan Super Giant	18 June 2026	Free	
6	MF	(Uzbekistan) Sirojiddin Kuziev	(Uzbekistan) Shurtan Guzar	7 July 2026	Free	
10	MF	(Argentina) Braian Sánchez	(Argentina) Deportivo Riestra	7 July 2026	End of loan	
	FW	(India) Halicharan Narzary	Without a club	31 May 2026	End of loan	
25	MF	(India) Namgyal Bhutia	(India) Chennaiyin FC	7 July 2026	Free	
12	MF	(India) Mohamed Salah	Without a club	13 July 2026	—N/a	
13	GK	(India) Jaspreet Singh	Without a club	14 July 2026	—N/a	
Total transfers out				7		

== Overview ==
Competition	First match	Last match	Starting round	Final position	Record							
Competition	First match	Last match	Starting round	Final position	Pld	W	D	L	GF	GA	GD	Win %
Super League	10 October 2026	May 2027	Matchday 1	TBD	6	5	1	0	10	4	+6	83.33
Super Cup			Group stage	Group stage					—			
Total					6	5	1	0	10	4	+6	83.33

Last updated: 20 November 2026
Source: Competitions

== Squad ==
=== Personnel ===
Role	Name	Refs.
Head coach	(Spain) Pep Muñoz	
Assistant coach	(Spain) Ferran Borras	
Assistant coach	(India) Nishad Nagraj	
Goalkeeping coach	(India) Muhammed Rashid Nalakath	
Strength and conditioning coach	(India) Dhruv Balaraman	
Team analyst	(India) Prateek Chopra	
Reserves coach	(India) Renedy Singh	
Academy head coach	(India) Sandesh Bhoite	
Head Physio	(India) Naved Hameed	
Assistant physio	(India) V. Kiran Kumar	
Masseur	(India) Ratheesh Mon	
Kit Manager	(India) Gireesh Mallappa	
Staff strength	12	

=== Players under contract ===
No.	Name	Nat	Position	Date of Birth (Age)	Since	Until	Picked for	
No.	Name	Nat	Position	Date of Birth (Age)	Since	Until	ISL	SC
Goalkeepers
1	Gurpreet Singh Sandhu (3rd Captain)	(India)	GK	3 February 1992 (aged 34)	2017	2028	Yes	TBA
28	Lalthuammawia Ralte	(India)	GK	28 November 1992 (aged 33)	2024	2027	Yes	TBA
30	Sahil Poonia	(India)	GK	8 March 2006 (aged 20)	2023	2027	Yes	TBA
44	Aheibam Suraj Singh	(India)	GK	18 February 2008 (aged 18)	2025	2028	Yes	TBA
Defenders
3	Menno Koch (4th Captain)	(Netherlands)	CB	2 July 1994 (aged 31)	2026	2027	Yes	TBA
4	Chinglensana Singh	(India)	CB	23 July 1996 (aged 29)	2024	2029	Yes	TBA
6	Sandro Sakho	(Portugal)	CB	1 May 1996 (aged 30)	2026	2027	Yes	TBA
18	Haobam Ricky Meetei	(India)	RB	30 August 2006 (aged 19)	2025	2027	Yes	TBA
26	Harsh Palande	(India)	CB	26 January 2005 (aged 21)	2025	2029	Yes	TBA
27	Nikhil Poojary (5th Captain)	(India)	RB	3 September 1995 (aged 30)	2024	2028	Yes	TBA
32	Roshan Singh	(India)	LB	2 February 1999 (aged 27)	2020	2029	Yes	TBA
66	Takhellambam Bungson Singh	(India)	CB	5 March 2007 (aged 19)	2025	2028	Yes	TBA
Midfielders
5	Manuel de Iriondo	(Argentina)	DM	6 May 1993 (aged 33)	2026	2027	Yes	TBA
8	Suresh Singh	(India)	DM	7 August 2000 (aged 25)	2019	2028	Yes	TBA
14	Soham Varshneya	(India)	RM	14 August 2004 (aged 21)	2024	2027	Yes	TBA
23	Lalremtluanga Fanai	(India)	DM	17 September 2004 (aged 21)	2020	2028	Yes	TBA
31	Vinith Venkatesh	(India)	CM	31 July 2005 (aged 20)	2022	2029	Yes	TBA
38	Ningthoukhongjam Rishi Singh	(India)	MF	23 March 2008 (aged 18)	2025	2027	Yes	TBA
48	Mohammed Arbash	(India)	CM	29 September 2008 (aged 17)	2025	2027	Yes	TBA
51	Shivaldo Singh	(India)	RM	13 June 2004 (aged 21)	2023	2028	Yes	TBA
72	Yaiphremba Chingakham	(India)	MF	6 February 2008 (aged 18)	2025	2027	Yes	TBA
Forwards
7	Borja Martínez	(Spain)	LW	3 February 1994 (aged 32)	2026	2027	Yes	TBA
9	Mihailo Perović	(Montenegro)	CF	23 January 1997 (aged 29)	2026	2027	Yes	TBA
10	Ryan Williams (Vice-Captain)	(India)	RW	28 October 1993 (aged 32)	2023	2028	Yes	TBA
11	Sunil Chhetri (Captain)	(India)	CF	3 August 1984 (aged 41)	2013	2027	Yes	TBA
17	Monirul Molla	(India)	CF	1 May 2005 (aged 21)	2023	2028	Yes	TBA
22	Ashique Kuruniyan	(India)	LW	14 June 1997 (aged 28)	2025	2029	Yes	TBA
29	Serto Worneilen Kom	(India)	CF	25 March 2004 (aged 22)	2025	2028	Yes	TBA
37	Kelvin Singh Taorem	(India)	FW	22 November 2005 (aged 19)	2024	2027	Yes	TBA
39	Sivasakthi Narayanan	(India)	CF	9 July 2001 (aged 24)	2021	2029	No	TBA

== Preseason ==
Bengaluru FC players gather during 2026-27 open training session at Centre of Excellence Phase-3 in Bettahalasuru, Karnataka.

Led by Pep Muñoz, the Blues assembled and began their pre-season training at Padukone – Dravid Centre for Sports Excellence in Bengaluru and played a friendly against India U-20, before departing for Inspire Institute of Sport in Ballari during the end of July. The pre-season training in Ballari continued until late August before they returned to Bengaluru for the annual open training session on 12 September 2026. A traditional event where Bengaluru FC hold a session involving supporters prior to the start of the season.

The Blues continued their pre-season training in Bengaluru without Ashique Kuruniyan, Gurpreet Singh Sandhu, Ricky Meetei Haobam and Ryan Williams as they had been called up for national duties for a friendlyies against Panama, Brazil and Uruguay. Coach Pep Muñoz hinted at a total seven friendlies arranged for the team before the start of the season, with the team already having played three of the seven, which included a 3–0 win over Indian Under-20 national team.

=== Friendlies ===
July 2026 Friendly-1	Bengaluru	3–0	India U-20	Bettahalasuru, Karnataka
10:00 IST		Report		Stadium: Centre of Excellence

16 September 2026 Friendly-4	Bengaluru	1–2	Malappuram	Bettahalasuru, Karnataka
10:00 IST		Report		Stadium: Centre of Excellence

20 September 2026 Friendly-5	Bengaluru	3–2	Indian Air Force	Bettahalasuru, Karnataka
17:00 IST		Report		Stadium: Centre of Excellence

26 September 2026 Friendly-6	Bengaluru	0–1	Chennaiyin	Bettahalasuru, Karnataka
19:00 IST		Report		Stadium: Centre of Excellence

== Super League ==
=== Summary ===
Pos	Team	Pld	W	D	L	GF	GA	GD	Pts	Qualification
1	Bengaluru	5	4	1	0	10	4	+6	13	League Shield Winners and qualification for the Challenge League preliminary stage and semi-finals
2	Mohun Bagan (Note: If Mohun Bagan SG, who are banned from AFC competitions until 2028–29 season. If they become Indian Super League champions, the ISL league runners-up will qualify for Challenge League preliminary stage.)	5	4	0	1	8	5	+3	12	Qualification for the SAFF Club Championship and semi-finals
3	NorthEast United	6	3	2	1	8	3	+5	11	Qualification for the knockouts
4	Delhi	6	2	2	2	12	10	+2	8	Qualification for the knockouts
5	Punjab	5	2	2	1	8	7	+1	8	Qualification for the knockouts

Updated to match(es) played on 21 November 2026. Source: Indian Super League
Rules for classification: 1) points; 2) goal difference; 3) number of goals scored; 4) head-to-head points; 5) head-to-head goal difference; 6) head-to-head goals scored; 7) fair play ranking; 8) drawing of lots
(Note: Head-to-head record is used only after all the matches between the teams in question have been played).

==== Result summary ====
Overall								Home						Away					
Pld	W	D	L	GF	GA	GD	Pts	W	D	L	GF	GA	GD	W	D	L	GF	GA	GD
5	4	1	0	10	4	+6	13	3	0	0	7	2	+5	1	1	0	3	2	+1

==== Results by round ====
Matchday	1	2	3	4	5	6	7	8	9	10	11	12	13	14	15	16	17	18	19	20	21	22	23	24	25	26
Ground	H	H	×	A	A	H	×	A	A	H	H	H	A	H	A	A	H	A	A	H	H	H	A	H	A	A
Result	W	W	×	D	W	W	×																			
Position	2	2	4	3	3																					

Updated to match(es) played on 20 November 2026. Source: soccerway
A = Away; H = Home; W = Win; D = Draw; L = Loss; = League premiers, qualification to
2027–28 AFC Challenge League playoffs; = Qualification for ISL Semi-finals; = Qualification for ISL Play-offs; = Relegation to 2027–28 IFL; × = No match scheduled in the round

=== League matches ===
10 October 2026 1	Bengaluru	3–2	SC Delhi	Bengaluru, Karnataka
17:00 IST	Martínez 22', 75'; Koch 89'	Report	26' Rodrigo; 32' (o.g.) Koch; (yellow card) 45' Azhar; (yellow card) 81' Ndayishimiye; (yellow card) 84' Manoj	Stadium: Sree Kanteerava Stadium; Attendance: 10,623; Referee: Ashwin; Man of the Match: Borja Martínez

17 October 2026 2	Bengaluru	2–0	Chennaiyin	Bengaluru, Karnataka
19:30 IST	Williams 24'; Shivaldo (yellow card) 33'; Ricky (yellow card) 45'; Perović 52'; Poojary (yellow card) 78'	Report	Imanishimwe (yellow card) 35'	Stadium: Sree Kanteerava Stadium; Attendance: 10,211; Referee: Lakshay Tushir; Man of the Match: Borja Martínez

30 October 2026 3	NorthEast United	1–1	Bengaluru	Guwahati, Assam
19:30 IST	Jithin 15'; P. Singh (yellow card) 43'	Report	(yellow card) 40' Williams; (yellow card) 52' S. Singh; (yellow card) 87' Koch; 90+3' Venkatesh	Stadium: Sarusajai Stadium; Attendance: 11,337; Referee: I Jamal Mohamed; Man of the Match: Jithin M.S. (NorthEast United)

6 November 2026 4	FC Goa	1–2	Bengaluru	Madgaon, Goa
19:30 IST	Franchu 17'; Malsawmsanga (yellow card) 90'; Raj (yellow card) 90+2'	Report	12' Martínez; (yellow card) 69' de Iriondo; (yellow card) 82' Ricky; (yellow card) 90+1' Kuruniyan; 90+3' Varshneya	Stadium: Fatorda Stadium; Attendance: 3,001; Referee: Pratik Mondal; Man of the Match: Ricky Meitei

20 November 2026 5	Bengaluru	2–0	Mumbai City	Bengaluru, Karnataka
19:30 IST	de Iriondo (yellow card) 36'; Martínez 57' (pen.); Williams 85'	Report		Stadium: Sree Kanteerava Stadium; Attendance: 10,213; Referee: Surojit Das; Man of the Match: Sandro Sakho

4 December 2026 6	Odisha	–	Bengaluru	Bhubaneswar, Odisha
17:00 IST				Stadium: Kalinga Stadium

9 December 2026 7	Mohun Bagan	–	Bengaluru	Kolkata, West Bengal
19:30 IST				Stadium: Salt Lake Stadium

17 December 2026 8	Bengaluru	–	East Bengal	Bengaluru, Karnataka
19:30 IST				Stadium: Sree Kanteerava Stadium

22 December 2026 9	Bengaluru	–	Punjab	Bengaluru, Karnataka
17:00 IST				Stadium: Sree Kanteerava Stadium

3 January 2027 10	Bengaluru	–	Kerala Blasters	Bengaluru, Karnataka
19:30 IST				Stadium: Sree Kanteerava Stadium

9 January 2027 11	Churchill Brothers	–	Bengaluru	Madgaon, Goa
19:30 IST				Stadium: Fatorda Stadium

16 January 2027 12	Bengaluru	–	Inter Kashi	Bengaluru, Karnataka
19:30 IST				Stadium: Sree Kanteerava Stadium

23 January 2027 13	Inter Kashi	–	Bengaluru	Pune, Maharashtra
17:00 IST				Stadium: Shree Shiv Chhatrapati Sports Complex

30 January 2027 14	East Bengal	–	Bengaluru	Kolkata, West Bengal
19:30 IST				Stadium: Salt Lake Stadium

5 February 2027 15	Bengaluru	–	Churchill Brothers	Bengaluru, Karnataka
19:30 IST				Stadium: Sree Kanteerava Stadium

14 February 2027 16	Mumbai City	–	Bengaluru	Mumbai, Maharashtra
19:30 IST				Stadium: Mumbai Football Arena

21 February 2027 17	Chennaiyin	–	Bengaluru	Chennai, Tamil Nadu
17:00 IST				Stadium: Marina Arena

27 February 2027 18	Bengaluru	–	FC Goa	Bengaluru, Karnataka
19:30 IST				Stadium: Sree Kanteerava Stadium

6 March 2027 19	Bengaluru	–	Odisha	Bengaluru, Karnataka
17:00 IST				Stadium: Sree Kanteerava Stadium

14 March 2027 20	Bengaluru	–	Mohun Bagan	Bengaluru, Karnataka
19:30 IST				Stadium: Sree Kanteerava Stadium

18 March 2027 21	Kerala Blasters	–	Bengaluru	Kochi, Kerala
19:30 IST				Stadium: JLN Kochi

4 April 2027 22	Bengaluru	–	NorthEast United	Bengaluru, Karnataka
19:30 IST				Stadium: Sree Kanteerava Stadium

9 April 2027 22	Punjab	–	Bengaluru	New Delhi, Delhi
19:30 IST				Stadium: JLN Delhi

TBD 2027 24	SC Delhi	–	Bengaluru	New Delhi, Delhi
: IST				Stadium: JLN Delhi

== Accolades ==
=== Player of the match awards ===
Rank	Nat.	Player	ISL	SC	Total
1	(Spain)	Borja Martínez	2	0	2
2	(India)	Ricky Meitei	1	0	1
2	(Portugal)	Sandro Sakho	1	0	1
Totals			4	0	4

Updated: 20 November 2026

== Statistics ==
=== Appearances and goals ===
No.	Pos	Nat	Player	Total		ISL		Super Cup	
No.	Pos	Nat	Player	Apps	Goals	Apps	Goals	Apps	Goals
Goalkeepers
1	GK	(India) IND	Gurpreet Singh	5	0	5+0	0	0+0	0
28	GK	(India) IND	Lalthuammawia Ralte	0	0	0+0	0	0+0	0
30	GK	(India) IND	Sahil Poonia	0	0	0+0	0	0+0	0
44	GK	(India) IND	Aheibam Suraj	0	0	0+0	0	0+0	0
Defenders
3	CB	(Netherlands) NED	Menno Koch	5	1	5+0	1	0+0	0
4	CB	(India) IND	Chinglensana Singh	5	0	4+1	0	0+0	0
6	CB	(Portugal) POR	Sandro Sakho	3	0	2+1	0	0+0	0
18	RB	(India) IND	Haobam Ricky	3	0	3+0	0	0+0	0
26	CB	(India) IND	Harsh Palande	0	0	0+0	0	0+0	0
27	RB	(India) IND	Nikhil Poojary	3	0	1+2	0	0+0	0
32	LB	(India) IND	Roshan Singh	4	0	2+2	0	0+0	0
66	CB	(India) IND	Bungson Singh	0	0	0+0	0	0+0	0
Midfielders
5	DM	(Argentina) ARG	Manuel de Iriondo	5	0	4+1	0	0+0	0
8	DM	(India) IND	Suresh Singh	4	0	2+2	0	0+0	0
14	RM	(India) IND	Soham Varshneya	5	1	3+2	1	0+0	0
23	DM	(India) IND	Lalremtluanga Fanai	5	0	5+0	0	0+0	0
31	CM	(India) IND	Vinith Venkatesh	2	1	1+1	1	0+0	0
38	MF	(India) IND	Rishi Singh	0	0	0+0	0	0+0	0
48	CM	(India) IND	Mohammed Arbash	0	0	0+0	0	0+0	0
51	RM	(India) IND	Shivaldo Singh	3	0	3+0	0	0+0	0
72	MF	(India) IND	Yaiphremba Chingakham	1	0	0+1	0	0+0	0
Forwards
7	RW	(Spain) ESP	Borja Martínez	5	4	5+0	4	0+0	0
9	CF	(Montenegro) MNE	Mihailo Perović	3	1	2+1	1	0+0	0
10	RW	(India) IND	Ryan Williams	5	2	4+1	2	0+0	0
11	CF	(India) IND	Sunil Chhetri	4	0	2+2	0	0+0	0
17	CF	(India) IND	Monirul Molla	2	0	0+2	0	0+0	0
22	LW	(India) IND	Ashique Kuruniyan	4	0	2+2	0	0+0	0
29	FW	(India) IND	Serto Kom	0	0	0+0	0	0+0	0
37	FW	(India) IND	Kelvin Singh	1	0	0+1	0	0+0	0
39	CF	(India) IND	Sivasakthi Narayanan	0	0	0+0	0	0+0	0

- Source: soccerway

Updated: 20 November 2026

=== Goal scorers ===
Rank	No.	Pos	Nat	Player	ISL	SC	Total
1	7	CF	(Spain)	Borja Martínez	4	0	4
2	10	RW	(India)	Ryan Williams	2	0	2
2	3	CB	(Netherlands)	Menno Koch	1	0	1
2	9	CF	(Montenegro)	Mihailo Perović	1	0	1
2	31	CM	(India)	Vinith Venkatesh	1	0	1
2	14	RM	(India)	Soham Varshneya	1	0	1
Totals					10	0	10

Updated: 20 November 2026

=== Clean sheets ===
Rank	No.	Pos	Nat	Player	ISL	SC	Total
1	1	GK	(India)	Gurpreet Singh Sandhu	1	0	1
Totals					2	0	2

Updated: 20 November 2026

=== Disciplinary record ===
Rank	No.	Pos	Nat	Player	ISL			SC			Total			Points	Notes
Rank	No.	Pos	Nat	Player	Yellow card	Second yellow card	Red card	Yellow card	Second yellow card	Red card	Yellow card	Second yellow card	Red card	Points	Notes
1	51	RM	(India)	Shivaldo Singh	2	0	0	0	0	0	2	0	0	2	—N/a
1	18	RB	(India)	Ricky Meitei	2	0	0	0	0	0	2	0	0	2	(Note: Suspended for opening match against SC Delhi due to the red card received against Chennaiyin FC at the end of the previous season.)
1	5	DM	(Argentina)	Manuel de Iriondo	2	0	0	0	0	0	2	0	0	2	—N/a
2	27	RB	(India)	Nikhil Poojary	1	0	0	0	0	0	1	0	0	1	—N/a
2	10	RW	(India)	Ryan Williams	1	0	0	0	0	0	1	0	0	1	—N/a
2	3	CB	(Netherlands)	Menno Koch	1	0	0	0	0	0	1	0	0	1	—N/a
2	22	LW	(India)	Ashique Kuruniyan	1	0	0	0	0	0	1	0	0	1	—N/a
Totals					9	0	0	0	0	0	9	0	0	9	—N/a

Disciplinary points: yellow card = 1 point, red card as a result of two yellow cards = 3 points, direct red card = 3 points, yellow card followed by direct red card = 4 points. 4 yellow cards or a red card leads to a one match suspension.
Updated: 20 November 2026

== See also ==
- List of Bengaluru FC seasons
- 2026–27 in Indian football
