= Bengaluru FC (women) =

Association women's football club in India

Bengaluru FC Women
- Full name: Bengaluru Football Club Women (ಬೆಂಗಳೂರು ಕಾಲ್ಚೆಂಡು ಕ್ಲಬ್ ಹೆಂಗಸರು)
- Nickname: The Blues (ಬ್ಲೂಸ್)
- Short name: BFC women
- Founded: 17 September 2021; 5 years ago
- Ground: Bangalore Football Stadium
- Capacity: 8,400
- Owner: JSW Sports
- CEO: Sajjan Jindal
- Head coach: Sandeep Singh
- League: Karnataka Women's League
- 2025–26: 6th
Home colours	Away colours

Bengaluru Football Club Women ([ˈbeŋɡəɭuːɾu]; Kannada: ಬೆಂಗಳೂರು.ಎಫ್.ಸಿ) commonly referred to as BFC Women, is a women's professional football club based in Bengaluru, Karnataka. The club competes in Karnataka Women's League, the third-tier women's football league in India.

The club is owned and operated by JSW Sports and its CEO is Sajjan Jindal. After seven years of successful establishment and operations of the men's team, Bengaluru FC, the club commenced its women's team operations in 2021.

== History ==
=== Background ===
In early 2013, JSW Group, which had previously considered forming a football club in Bengaluru, India, was interested in bidding for a spot in the I-League and on 15 May, The All India Football Federation (AIFF) received a bid from the group. Two months later, on 28 May 2013, it was officially announced JSW Group had won the rights to form a direct-entry men's team for the 2013–14 I-League season in Bengaluru, Bengaluru FC. On 20 July, JSW Group officially established the club as "Bengaluru Football Club" at the Bangalore Football Stadium, which had been announced as the men's home stadium for the upcoming season.

=== Inception ===
Since its establishment of men's team, the club has shown support for women, with the men's team having their third kit in pink. The pink kit is especially worn during International Women's Day at home. In May 2019, the club had also organised women's 5-a-side tournament as part of the AFC Grassroots Festival involving eight teams across the city. Later on 21 November 2019, the club facilitated a week-long trial for Indian women's national team's striker Bala Devi Ngangom, with Rangers W.F.C. Karnataka Women's League was also established in 2019, thus supporting the discussions for the formation of a women's side of the club.

Seven years later, on 17 September 2021, the club officially announced the formation of its women's team. Beginning with under-11, under-13 and under-15 girls' squads, the club decided to gradually build the foundation for a senior team that would take shape in due course, as per the then club's CEO, Mandar Tamhane.

=== 2021–2023: Karnataka Women's A Division ===
On 15 February 2022, Bengaluru FC Women with their under-15 squad, kicked-off their debut campaign at the KSFA Women's A Division league, the second tier of women's football in Karnataka. The debut match ended in a 2–0 defeat for the Blues against Modern Girls. Two days later on 17 February in the club's second league game, the Blues registered a historic first victory with a thumping 10–0 win over against GRK Girls FC. Shloka Krishna became the first goalscorer for the team.

They eventually ended their season with 11 points on the table and finished in fourth place. Tanvi Nair was adjuded as U15 Girls' Academy player of the year on 30 May 2022, for her performance in the season. In the following season, the Blues registered five consecutive wins in the league and on 11 June 2023, a 7–0 victory over Young Stars FC led to the club's maiden title. It also sealed the promotion to Karnataka Women's League, the top-tier league of Karnataka and the third tier in India.

=== 2023–present: Karnataka Women's League ===
Upon promotion to Karnataka Women's League (KWL) in the 2023–24 season, the Blues registered their first win in the league against Rebels Women's FC on 18 September 2023. With Chinmayi Tili becoming the first goalscorer for the club in a 2–0 win at the state's top division. With 21 local players in a squad with an average age of 15 years, the Blues eventually finished eighth. Later in March 2024, Rheanna Jacob became the first player from the club to score for the Indian U-20 national team in any age category, against Nepal at the 2024 SAFF U-20 Championship.

The Blues began their second season in KWL with four wins in three games, but a late goal in their fifth encounter against Pass FC resullted in four defeats. They eventually finished sixth on the table with sixteen points. The 2025–26 season also saw the BFC Women finish sixth with thirteen points.

== Stadium ==
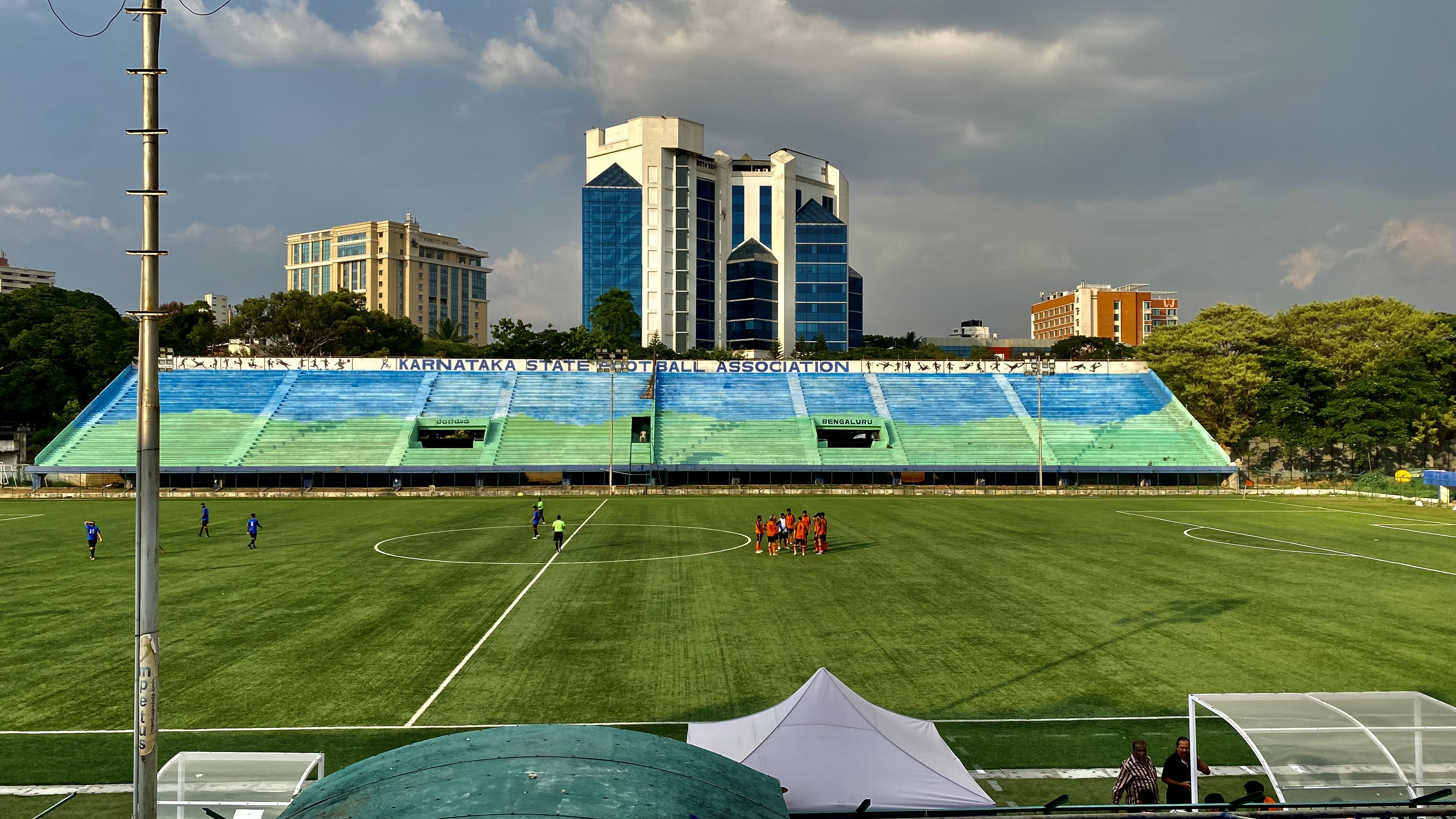
Bangalore Football Stadium

Like its Reserve and Academy counterpart, the women's team plays its games at the Bangalore Football Stadium (BFS), a football specific stadium with 8,400 seating capacity, located in Ashok Nagar in Bengaluru.

== Crest and colours ==
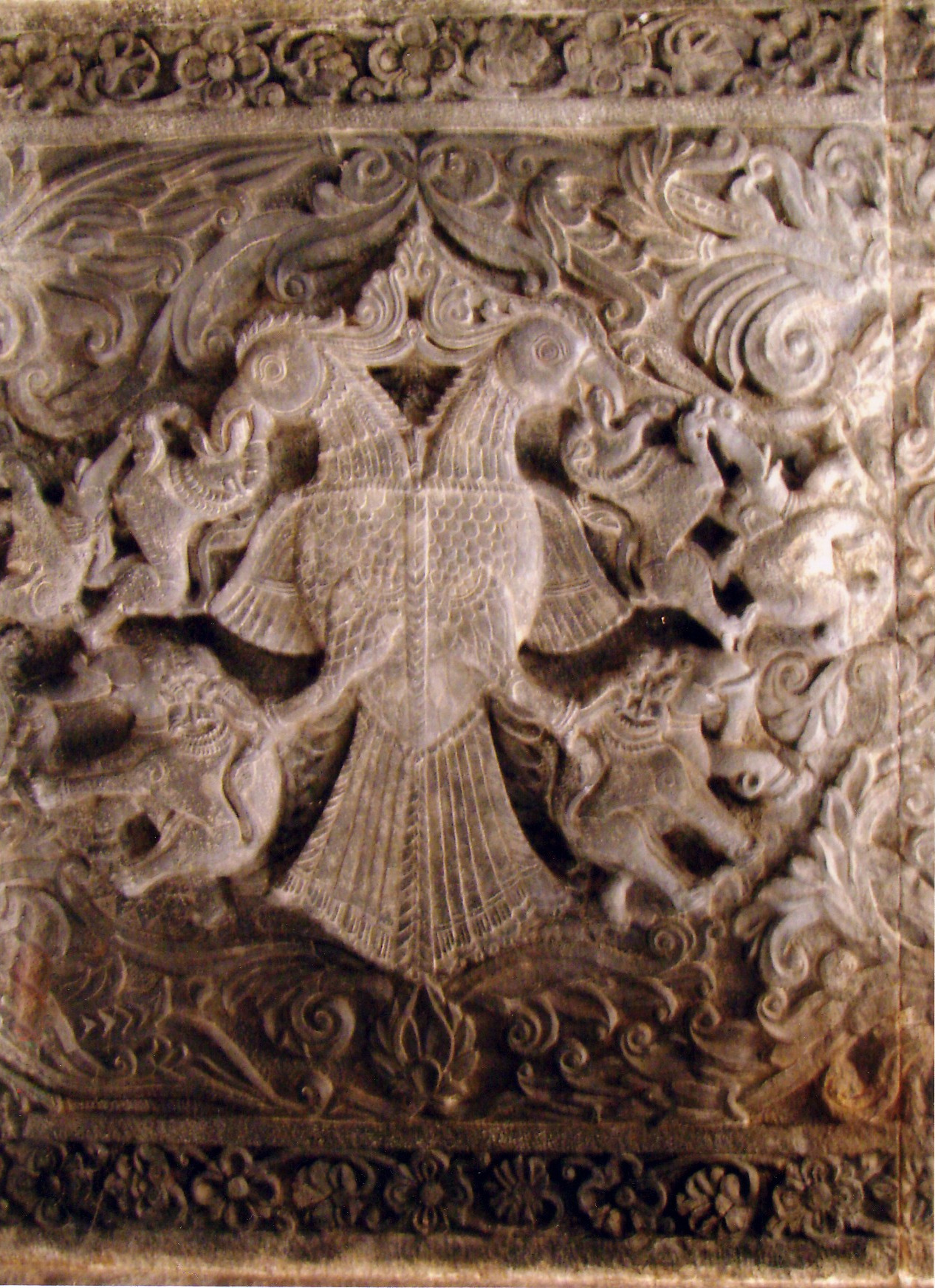
Gandaberunda mural in Keladi

The Bengaluru FC women's team carries the same home colours as men's team; the crest features the Bangalore Palace in white to symbolize the victory of the Wodeyars, who won the palace back. In the middle of the crest, a blue Gandaberunda, a mythical two-headed bird. The Gandaberunda is taken from the emblem of Karnataka.

On 24 January 2015, Bengaluru revealed Eddie the Eagle as its official mascot.

The club colour is blue; it is often known by the nickname "The Blues".

== Players ==
=== First-team squad ===
As of 28 July 2025

Note: Flags indicate national team as defined under FIFA eligibility rules; some limited exceptions apply. Players may hold more than one non-FIFA nationality.

No.	Pos.	Nation	Player
1	GK	IND	Khushi Kumari
2	FW	IND	Janani Thoppur
3	DF	IND	Kajal
4	DF	IND	Aabha Kudale
5	DF	IND	Vasty Haokip
6	MF	IND	Prakalya KG
7	MF	IND	Rheanna Jacob
8	MF	IND	Reeth Kashyap
9	DF	IND	Ruthu Sreenandan
10	MF	IND	Tanvi Nair (captain)
11	MF	IND	Chinmayi Tili
12	FW	IND	Aswani MR

No.	Pos.	Nation	Player
13	GK	IND	Ritika Thakur
14	FW	IND	Annika Srivastava
15	DF	IND	Saisha Chawla
16	FW	IND	Palak
17	MF	IND	Tia Zamora Fernandes
18	DF	IND	Anoushka Johnson
19	FW	IND	Hina Nirmalkar
20	DF	IND	Namita Belsariya
21	FW	IND	Cathrine Thanga
22	DF	IND	Aaroshi Govekar
44	MF	IND	Shubhangi Subba

== Club officials ==
As of 28 February 2026

Role	Name	Refs.
Head coach	(India) Sandeep Singh	
Manager	(India) Prarthana Sengupta	
Psychologist	(India) Liyaan Akkalkotkar	

== Season by season record ==
Bengaluru FC Women season by season record
Season	Division	Tier	Performance								
Season	Division	Tier	P	W	D	L	F	A	GD	Pts	Pos
2021–22	Karnataka Women's A Division	4th	8	4	1	3	18	12	+6	13	4th
2022–23	Karnataka Women's A Division	4th	10	9	1	0	44	5	+39	28	1st
2023–24	Karnataka Women's League	3rd	9	4	1	4	15	16	-1	13	6th
2024–25	Karnataka Women's League	3rd	10	5	1	4	17	15	+2	16	6th

== Honours ==
Bengaluru FC Women honours
Type	Competition	Titles	Seasons participated
**State**	Karnataka Women's League	0	2023–24, 2024–25, 2025–26
**State**	Karnataka Women's A Division League	1	2021–22, **2023–24**

Bold indicates champions of the season

== See also ==
- Bengaluru FC Futsal
- Bengaluru FC Reserves and Academy
