= Bengaluru FC =

Association football club in India

Bengaluru
- Full name: Bengaluru Football Club
- Nickname: The Blues
- Short name: BFC
- Founded: 20 July 2013; 13 years ago
- Ground: Kanteerava Stadium
- Capacity: 25,810
- Owner: JSW Sports
- Chairman: Sajjan Jindal
- Head Coach: Pep Muñoz
- League: Indian Super League
- 2025–26: Indian Super League, 4th of 14
- Website: bengalurufc.com
Home colours	Away colours	Third colours

Bengaluru Football Club is an Indian professional football club based in Bengaluru, Karnataka. The club competes in the Indian Super League, the top flight of Indian football.

The club was established on 20 July 2013, and began its first competitive season in the I-League on 22 September the same year. Since its inception, the club has won two I-League titles including one in its debut season, two Federation Cup titles, one Indian Super League title, and a Super Cup championship making it fourth-most successful club in Indian football.

The club is owned and operated by JSW Sports and its managing director Sajjan Jindal. Bengaluru has played its home matches at the Sree Kanteerava Stadium since the beginning of the 2014–15 season. Despite only playing four seasons in the I-League, the club was considered one of the model clubs of Indian football. Bengaluru drew praise for bringing a new sense of professionalism to Indian football, including the use of on field equipment meant to help player fitness.

On 22 September 2013, Bengaluru FC played its inaugural match, which ended in a 1–1 draw against Mohun Bagan. The club went on to win the I-League in its debut season and again in 2015–16. They won the ISL title in 2018–19. As well as three league titles, Bengaluru also won two Federation Cups in 2015 and 2017 and a Super Cup in 2018. Between 2015 and 2018, the club represented India in Asian club competition, competing in the AFC Cup for four consecutive years. During the 2016 AFC Cup, Bengaluru reached the final and lost 1–0 to Al-Quwa Al-Jawiya of Iraq. On 28 September 2019, it was announced that the club had entered into a partnership with the Scottish Premier League club Rangers. In 2022, Bengaluru FC beat Mumbai City to win the 131st Durand Cup.

== History ==
=== Inception ===
In January 2013, it was reported Mumbai Tigers (then known as Dodsal FC) had failed to register for the upcoming I-League 2nd Division. It was also rumoured the club could instead enter the I-League, India's top football league, directly through cash payment to the All India Football Federation (AIFF) and a promise to build a new football stadium. On 12 January, it was announced the AIFF had called for an executive meeting to decide whether to allow teams to enter directly the I-League for the 2013–14 season. At around the same time, uncertainty whether institutional clubs Air India, ONGC and then-suspended Mohun Bagan would be allowed to play in the league that season arose.

During the AIFF executive meeting on 15 January, it was officially announced the federation, in an effort to make the I-League more pan-Indian, would accept bids for two new, direct-entry clubs for the 2013–14 season from corporate groups. Corporate groups could bid to create teams outside Kolkata and Goa, and would have to create new infrastructure in their cities. The winning bids would be announced in March 2013 and the new clubs would be replacements for Air India and ONGC.

On 8 March 2013, it was reported JSW Group, which had previously considered forming a football club in Bangalore, was interested in bidding for a spot in the I-League. It was also reported AR Khaleel, the President of the Karnataka State Football Association and a senior official of the AIFF, had suggested Bangalore could be a host venue for the 2017 FIFA U-17 World Cup and that a corporate team in the city could help build new infrastructure. On 15 May that year, it was announced the AIFF had received three bids for two direct-entry spots. The bids came from JSW Group, Dodsal Group, and a consortium from Kerala.

On 28 May 2013, it was officially announced JSW Group had won the rights to form a direct-entry team for the 2013–14 I-League season in Bangalore, which would be done through the sports branch, JSW Sports. It was also announced JSW Group would set up a youth academy in Bangalore and would construct new infrastructure. On 20 July, JSW Group officially launched the club as "Bengaluru Football Club" at launch event at the Bangalore Football Stadium, which was announced as the club's home stadium for the upcoming season. Along with the club name and stadium, the squad, club crest, colours and home kit for the season were revealed.

=== Ashley Westwood era (2013–2016) ===
Immediately after winning the rights to form a direct-entry side, JSW Group began assembling a team. The club's first signing was midfielder Thoi Singh from Mumbai Tigers. On 2 July 2013, it was announced former Blackburn Rovers assistant manager Ashley Westwood would become the club's first head coach. On 16 July, JSW Group signed the club's first two foreign players, defenders John Johnson and Curtis Osano. Three days later, it was announced the club had signed the India national team captain Sunil Chhetri from Sporting Portugal B.

On 22 September that year, the club played their first official match in the I-League against Mohun Bagan at Bangalore Football Stadium. After a scoreless first-half, Bengaluru scored their first official goal in the 49th minute through Sean Rooney. In injury time, Mohun Bagan equalized through Chinadorai Sabeeth to end the match 1–1. Their next match brought Bengaluru's first win, defeating Rangdajied United 3–0 at the Bangalore Football Stadium.

The club played their first away game on 26 October 2013 against East Bengal at the Kalyani Stadium. In their first losing away game, Bengaluru lost 0–2 to the Kolkata-based side. Exactly a month later, the club won their first away match against Salgaocar at the Duler Stadium 2–1.

On 15 January 2014, Bengaluru played the first game in their first domestic cup competition, the Federation Cup, against Sporting Goa at the Manjeri Stadium. Bengaluru won 5–3 but went on to draw one match and lose another, and were knocked out in the group stage of the tournament.

On 21 April 2014, Bengaluru defeated Dempo 4–2 at the Fatorda Stadium to claim their first I-League title in their debut season. During the 2014–15 season, Bengaluru again participated in the Federation Cup, winning their first trophy on 11 January 2015 after defeating Dempo 2–1 in the final. Despite the cup victory and entering the season as defending league champions, Bengaluru lost the I-League title on the last day of the season, when they drew 1–1 against Mohun Bagan, who gained the title. Despite losing the title, Bengaluru ended the season with a 13-match unbeaten run. Bengaluru also participated in the Asian club competition for the first time but failed to qualify for the AFC Champions League; the team also reached Round 16 for the AFC Cup.

The next season, Bengaluru won their second I-League title, defeating Salgaocar 2–0 at home on 17 April 2016. The club also advanced further into the AFC Cup, reaching the quarter-finals after defeating Kitchee 3–2 in Round 16. Despite the club's achievement, Ashley Westwood left the club at the end of the season.

=== Albert Roca era and transition to Indian Super League (2016–2018) ===
Bengaluru FC appointed former FC Barcelona assistant coach Albert Roca as the head coach for two seasons. In his first game in charge of the club, Bengaluru FC won 1–0 against Tampines Rovers in the first leg of the quarter-finals of the AFC Cup 2016, and became the third Indian team to qualify for the tournament's semi-finals. They reached the final on 19 October 2016, the first Indian team to do so, by defeating defending champions Johor Darul Ta'zim F.C. 3–1 at home in the second leg of the semi-finals. On 5 November, Bengaluru played against the Iraqi club Al-Quwa Al-Jawiya in the final at the Suheim Bin Hamad Stadium in Qatar, losing the game 0–1. Bengaluru's first 2016–17 I-League season under Roca was not as successful; the club finished the season in fourth position, the lowest since 2013, after a winless run of seven games in January and February 2017. The club won their second Federation Cup title under Albert Roca in 2017, defeating Mohun Bagan 2–0 in the final. The club also reached the Inter-zonal final in the 2017 AFC Cup.

=== Carles Cuadrat era (2018–2021) ===
After two seasons as an assistant coach at Bengaluru FC, Carles Cuadrat took over as the head coach in July 2018 for the first time in his career. In his debut season, Bengaluru won the fifth edition of the ISL for the first time. The season brought multiple records, including an 11-game undefeated run in the league and a six-game winning run. They became the first team to finish on top of the regular season twice in succession and the first team to win the title after finishing top in the league phase. In 2019–20, Bengaluru reached the ISL play-offs after finishing third in the league phase. Under Cuadrat, Bengaluru set new records in 2019–20, becoming the first team to keep 11 clean sheets and went on a 17-match unbeaten run at home, 2 full seasons not losing in their Kanteereva Stadium. Towards the end of the 2019–20 season, Bengaluru beat Paro FC 9–1 at the Kanteerava in the AFC Cup qualifiers; their biggest-ever win. In January 2021, Bengaluru FC parted ways with Carles Cuadret on mutual consent. The change of coach did not bring any benefit to the team, which worsened its position in the table with the new coach and only got 2 wins in the remaining 11 games of the championship.

=== Marco Pezzaiuoli era (2021–2022) ===
On 12 February 2021, the club announced Marco Pezzaiuoli as their new head coach on a three-year performance-based contract. Under his stewardship, Bengaluru began its 2020–21 Indian Super League campaign on 20 November against NorthEast United with a 4–2 win, followed by a 7 match winless streak. The team failed to qualify for the playoffs for the second time in a row, confirming the departure of Marco. On 14 December 2023, the club roped in Spanish tactician Zaragoza as new head coach until 2025.

== Crest, colours & kits ==
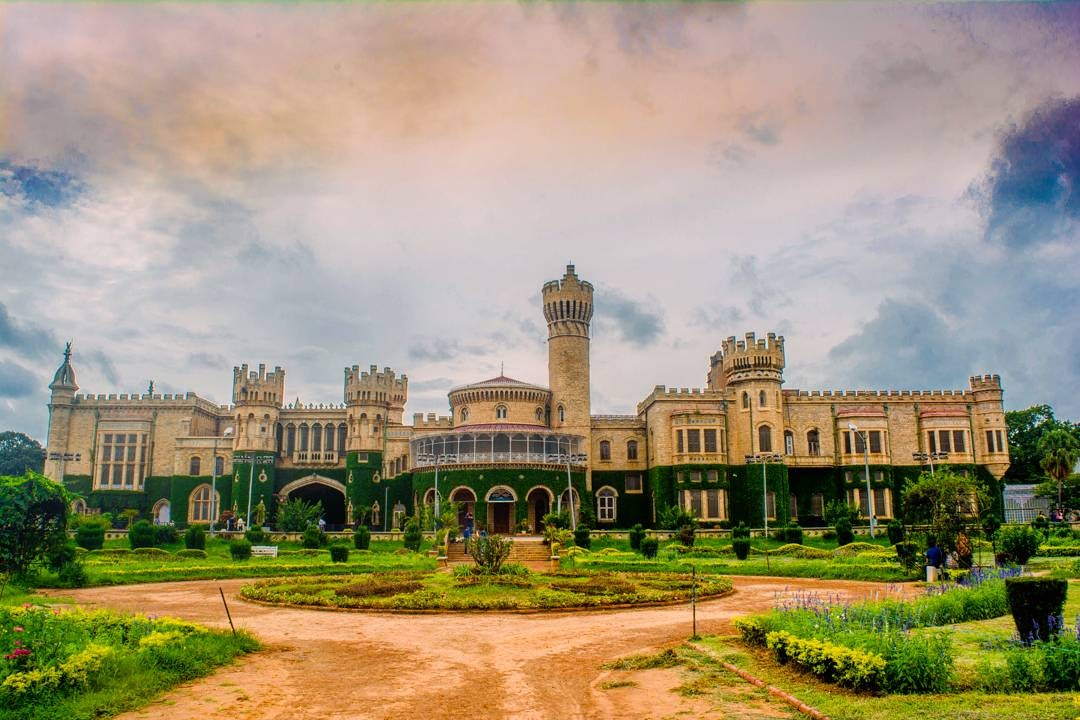
The Bangalore Palace

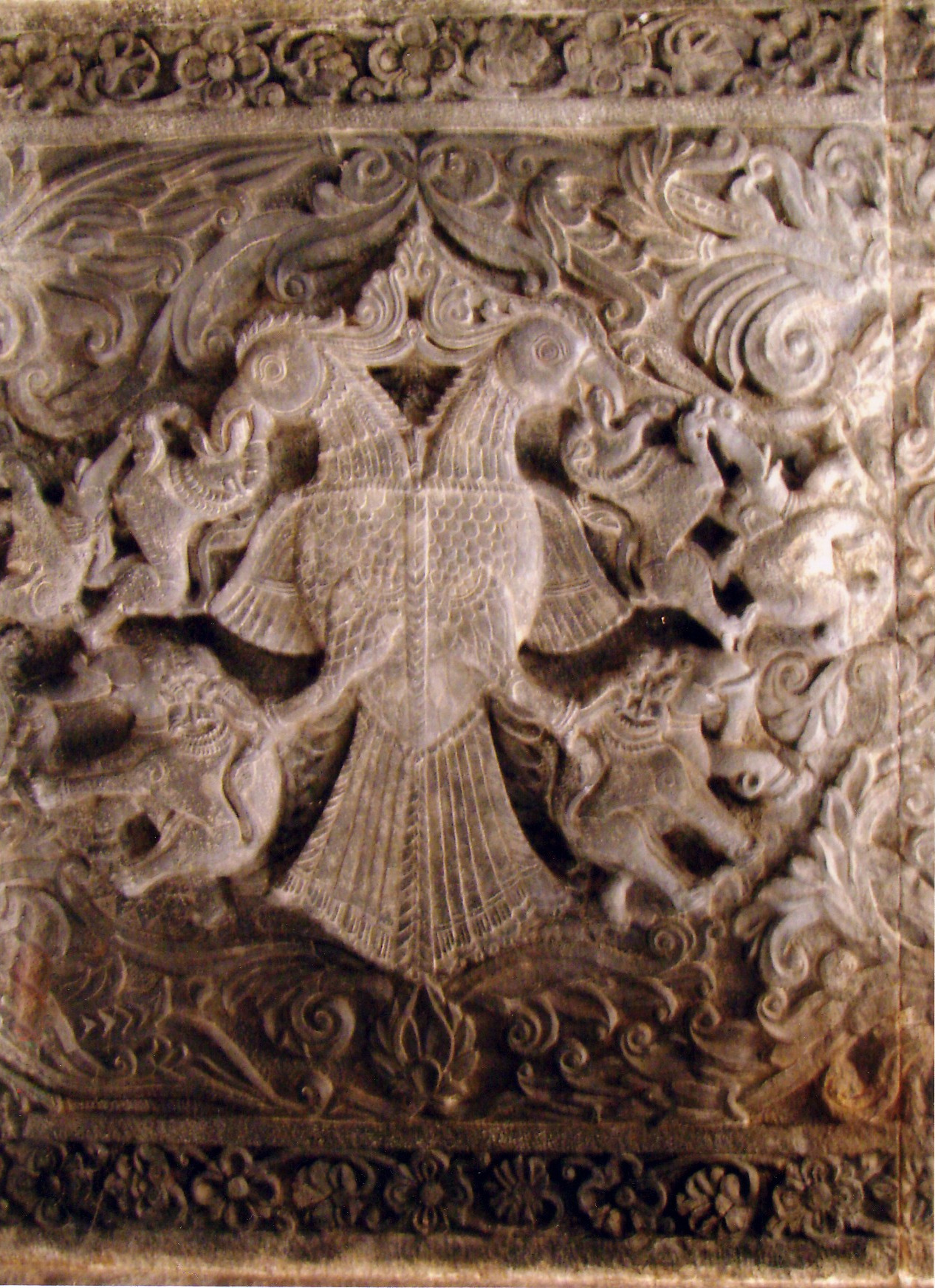
Gandaberunda bird in the Rameshwara temple at keladi

Bengaluru FC' home livery was unveiled during the 21 July JSW launch; the crest features the Bangalore Palace coloured white to symbolize the victory of the Wodeyars, who won the palace back. In the middle of the crest, a blue Gandaberunda – a mythical two-headed bird, symbolizes the pride, resilience, and bravery of the people of Bengaluru. The Gandaberunda is taken from the coat of arms of the state of Karnataka. On 24 January 2015, Bengaluru revealed Eddie The Eagle as its official mascot.

The club colour is blue; it is often known by the nickname "The Blues".

=== Kit manufacturers and shirt sponsors ===
Period	Kit manufacturer	Shirt sponsor	Back sponsor
2013–14		JSW	
2014–17	Puma	JSW	
2017–18	Puma	JSW	Kingfisher
2018–20	Puma	Kia	Kingfisher
2020–22	Puma	JSW	DafaNews
2022–24	Puma	JSW	Parimatch Sports
2024–25	Puma	JSW	Batery
2025–26	Puma	JSW	Century
2026–27	Puma	JSW	Century

In July 2014, Bengaluru signed a deal with Puma, which became the club's kit sponsor from the 2014–15 season. The club's parent company JSW Group was the team's principal sponsor from inception until 2018, when the club signed a four-year deal with South Korean car company Kia Motors as the principal sponsor. The contract was terminated by the start of the 2020–21 season and JSW Group returned as the principal sponsor.

In July 2020, DafaNews renewed partnership with Indian Super League club Bengaluru FC. Partnership was extended the deal by a year, by which DafaNews will remain the club's Official Digital News Portal.

=== Kit evolution ===
==== Home Kit ====
2013–14	2014–15	2015–16	2016–17	2017–18	2018–19	2019–20	2020–21	2021–22	2022–23
2023–24	2024–25	2025–27

== Stadium ==
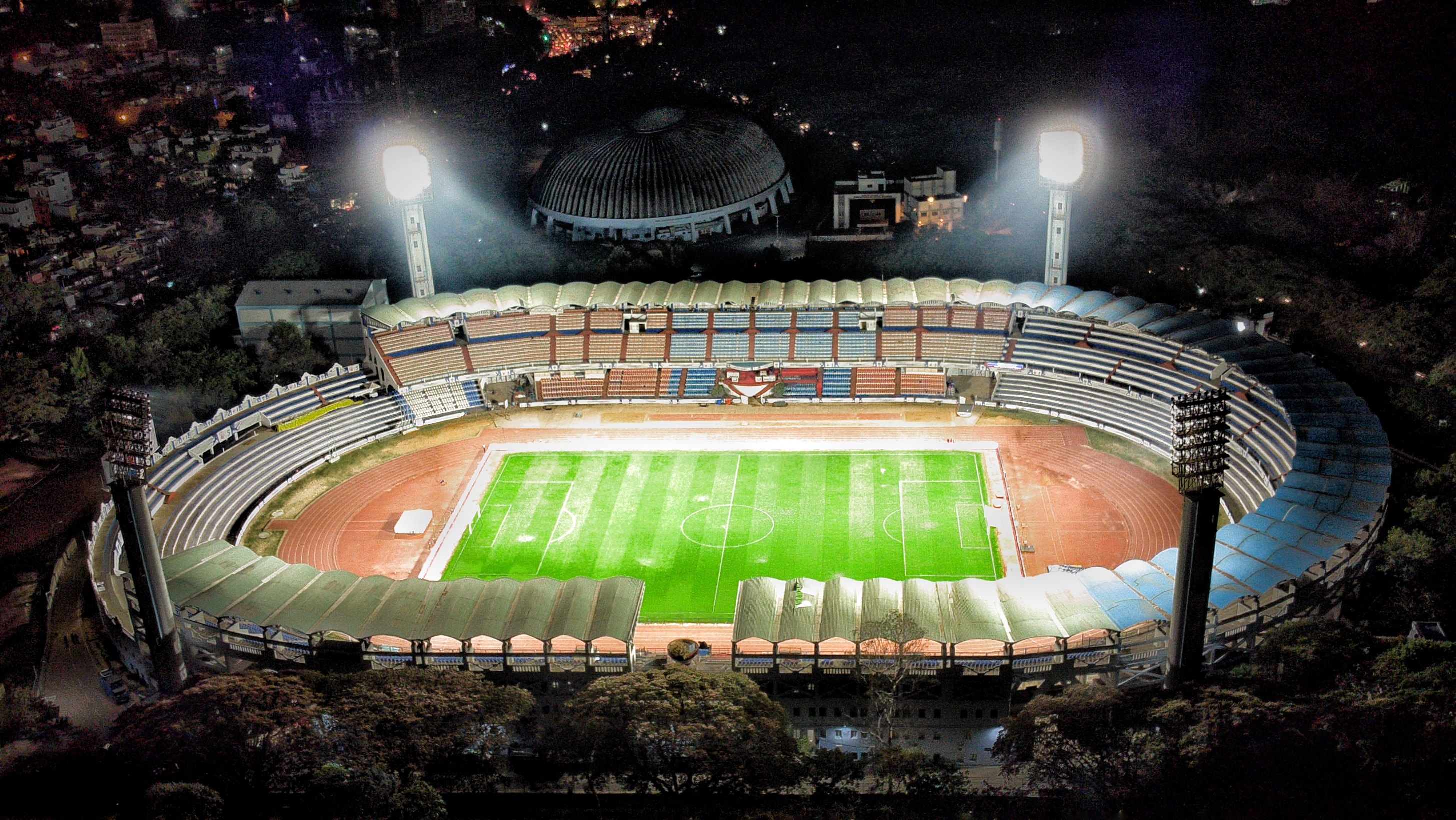
Kanteerava Stadium, home of Bengaluru FC

In their first season, Bengaluru FC played home games at Bangalore Football Stadium in the city centre. The West stand was the largest and most capacious stand, and housed the VIP boxes during I-League and other major matches. During the club's launch, it was announced the team would play at Bangalore Football Stadium for the 2013–14 I-League season. The stadium had a capacity of 15,000 and its pitch was covered with astroturf.

From the 2014–15 season, the club started playing home games at the 24,000 capacity Sree Kanteerava Stadium. There are eight entrances to the stadium, and nine stands are used for Bengaluru FC matches. West Block A stand is the largest stand in the stadium and is home to the West Block Blues supporters' club. Due to criticisms of the artificial pitch at Bangalore Football Stadium, the new stadium's pitch is covered with natural grass. All stands except the North Stand have permanent seating. Some fans refer to the Sree Kanteerva Stadium as 'The Fortress".

== Supporters ==
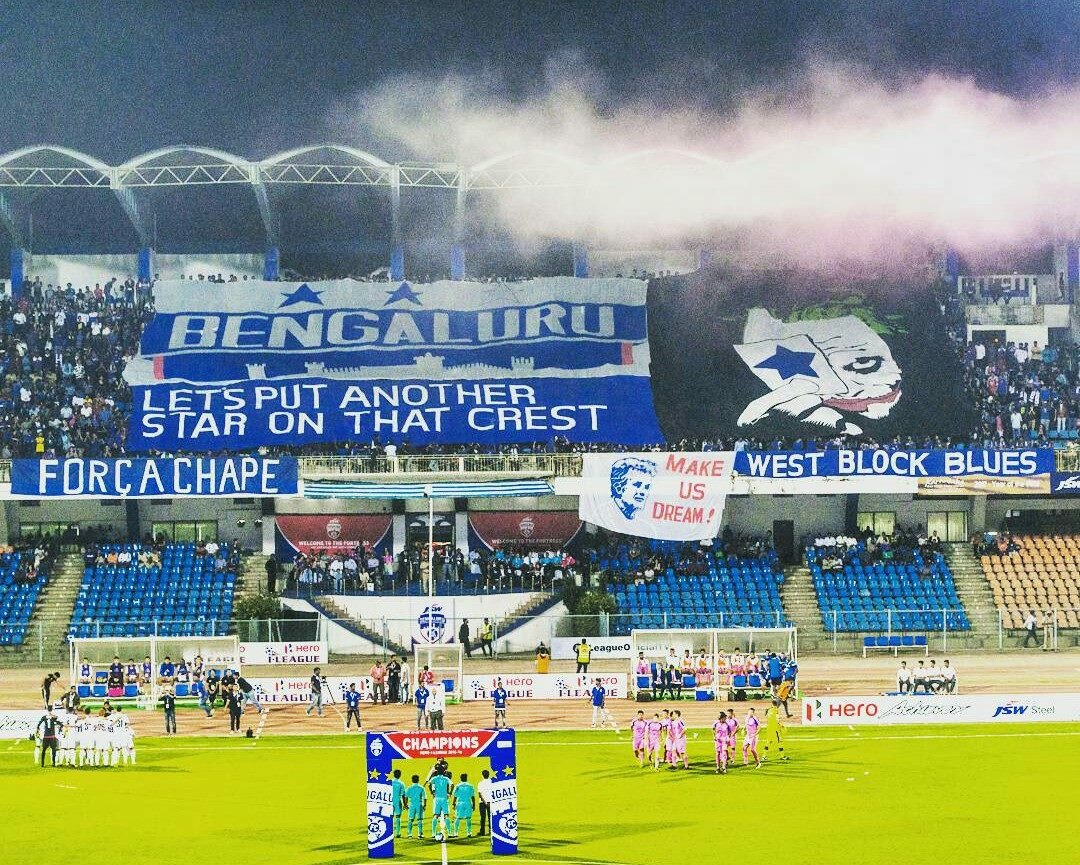
West Block Blues unveiling banner

Bengaluru FC is reputed to have one of the most vocal fanbases in India. The fans are known as the West Block Blues, which is named after West Block A in the Bangalore Football Stadium.

The players and the coach have often acknowledged the fans' support in their success, and called them "The 12th Man". Apart from supporting Bengaluru FC, the fan club has frequently supported the India national football team, and unfurled a 5,000 sq ft (460 m^{2}) banner at the India vs Guam game.

== Rivalries ==
In the initial years of the club, Bengaluru FC played in the I-league before joining the Indian Super League. The club played important games against Mohun Bagan, sparking a rivalry between the clubs which continued in ISL when Mohun Bagan joined the league.

=== South Indian Derby ===
Bengaluru FC has also developed a famous rivalry with South Indian club Kerala Blasters. The rivalry stems from the competition between the clubs' fan bases; Manjappada and Bengaluru's West Block Blues.

=== Statistics ===
Opponent	GP	W	D	L	GF	GA	GD	Win %
Chennaiyin (2017–2025)	17	10	3	4	29	16	+13	58.82
Kerala Blasters (2017–2025)	20	12	4	4	35	22	+13	60.00
Mohun Bagan SG (2013–2025)	28	6	6	16	28	47	−19	21.43

- In All Competitions, as of 12.04.2025 (I-League, Super Cup, Federation Cup, Durand Cup, AFC Cup (vs Mohun Bagan))
- Pen Shootout Results are Considered as W/L

== Players ==
=== First-team squad ===
As of 30 May 2025

Note: Flags indicate national team as defined under FIFA eligibility rules; some limited exceptions apply. Players may hold more than one non-FIFA nationality.

No.	Pos.	Nation	Player
1	GK	IND	Gurpreet Singh Sandhu (3rd captain)
3	DF	NED	Menno Koch (4th captain)
4	DF	IND	Chinglensana Singh Konsham
5	MF	ARG	Manuel de Iriondo
6	DF	POR	Sandro Sakho
7	FW	ESP	Borja Martínez
8	MF	IND	Suresh Singh Wangjam
9	FW	MNE	Mihailo Perović
10	FW	IND	Ryan Williams (vice-captain)
11	FW	IND	Sunil Chhetri (Captain)
14	MF	IND	Soham Varshneya
17	FW	IND	Monirul Molla
18	DF	IND	Ricky Meetei Haobam
22	MF	IND	Ashique Kuruniyan
23	MF	IND	Lalremtluanga Fanai

No.	Pos.	Nation	Player
26	DF	IND	Harsh Palande
27	DF	IND	Nikhil Poojary (5th captain)
28	GK	IND	Lalthuammawia Ralte
29	FW	IND	Serto Worneilen Kom
30	GK	IND	Sahil Poonia
31	MF	IND	Vinith Venkatesh
32	DF	IND	Naorem Roshan Singh
33	GK	IND	Aheibam Suraj Singh
37	FW	IND	Taorem Kelvin Singh
38	MF	IND	Ningthoukhongjam Rishi Singh
39	FW	IND	Sivasakthi Narayanan
48	MF	IND	MD Arbash
51	FW	IND	Chingambam Shivaldo Singh
66	DF	IND	Takhellambam Bungson Singh
72	DF	IND	Yaipharemba Chingakham
—	MF	IND	Takhellambam Bobbish

=== Out on loan ===
Note: Flags indicate national team as defined under FIFA eligibility rules; some limited exceptions apply. Players may hold more than one non-FIFA nationality.

No.	Pos.	Nation	Player

== Club officials ==
=== Current technical staff ===
As of 7 June 2026

Role	Name
Head coach	(Spain) Pep Muñoz
Assistant coach	(Spain) Ferran Borras
First Team coach	(India) Nishant Nagraj
Team analyst	(India) Prateek Chopra
Physiotherapist	(India) Naved Hameed
Physiotherapist	(India) V.K Kiran Kumar
Kit Manager	(India) Gireesh Mallappa
Masseur	(India) Ratheesh Mon

=== Management ===
Role	Name
Director of Football	(India) Darren Caldeira
Technical Consultant	(Spain) Albert Roca
Head of youth development	(Netherlands) Jan van Loon

== Managers ==
List of Bengaluru FC managers
Name	Nationality	From	To	Ref
Ashley Westwood	England	2 July 2013	31 May 2016	
Albert Roca	Spain	6 July 2016	31 May 2018	
Carles Cuadrat	Spain	1 July 2018	6 January 2021	
Naushad Moosa (Note: Caretaker manager)	India	6 January 2021	25 February 2021	
Marco Pezzaiuoli	Germany	12 February 2021	8 June 2022	
Simon Grayson	England	8 June 2022	9 December 2023	
Renedy Singh	India	9 December 2023	13 December 2023	
Gerard Zaragoza	Spain	14 December 2023	14 November 2025	
Renedy Singh	India	21 January 2026	26 March 2026	
Pep Muñoz	Spain	26 March 2026	Present	

== Season by season record ==
Season	Division	League										Federation Cup	Super Cup	AFC competitions		Top Goalscorer	
Season	Division	P	W	D	L	F	A	GD	Pts	Pos	Play-offs	Federation Cup	Super Cup	ACL Elite	ACL Two	Name	Goals
2013–14	I-League	24	14	5	5	42	28	+14	47	1st	—	GS	Did not exist	—		(India) Sunil Chhetri ♦	15
2014–15	I-League	20	10	7	3	35	19	+16	37	2nd	—	W	Did not exist	PR1	R16	(India) Sunil Chhetri	14
2015–16	I-League	16	10	2	4	24	17	+7	32	1st	—	QF	Did not exist	—	RU	(India) Sunil Chhetri	9
2016–17	I-League	18	8	6	4	30	15	+15	30	4th	—	W	Did not exist	PR2	IZF	(India) Sunil Chhetri	12
2017–18	Indian Super League	18	13	1	4	35	16	+19	40	1st	RU	Abolished	W	—	IZSF	(India) Sunil Chhetri	24
2018–19	Indian Super League	18	10	4	4	29	22	+7	34	1st	W	Abolished	QF	—	—	(India) Sunil Chhetri	10
2019–20	Indian Super League	18	8	6	4	22	13	+9	30	3rd	SF	Abolished	—	—	PS	(India) Sunil Chhetri	11
2020–21	Indian Super League	20	5	7	8	26	28	–2	22	7th	DNQ	Abolished	—	—	GS	(India) Sunil Chhetri	8
2021–22	Indian Super League	20	8	5	7	32	27	+5	29	6th	DNQ	Abolished	—	—		(Brazil) Cleiton Silva	10
2022–23	Indian Super League	20	11	1	8	27	23	+4	34	4th	RU	Abolished	RU	—		(India) Sivasakthi Narayanan	11
2023–24	Indian Super League	22	5	7	10	20	34	–14	22	10th	DNQ	Abolished	GS	—		(Spain) Javi Hernández	6
2024–25	Indian Super League	24	11	5	8	40	31	+9	38	3rd	RU	Abolished	R16	—		(India) Sunil Chhetri	17
2025–26	Indian Super League	13	6	5	2	18	12	+6	23	4th	—	Abolished	GS	—		(India) Ryan Williams	6

	Champions
	Runners-up
	Third Place
♦	Top scorer in league
PS	Play-off Stage
IZF	Interzonal finalist
IZSF	Interzonal Semi-finalist
PR	Preliminary Round

== Honours ==
=== Trophies ===
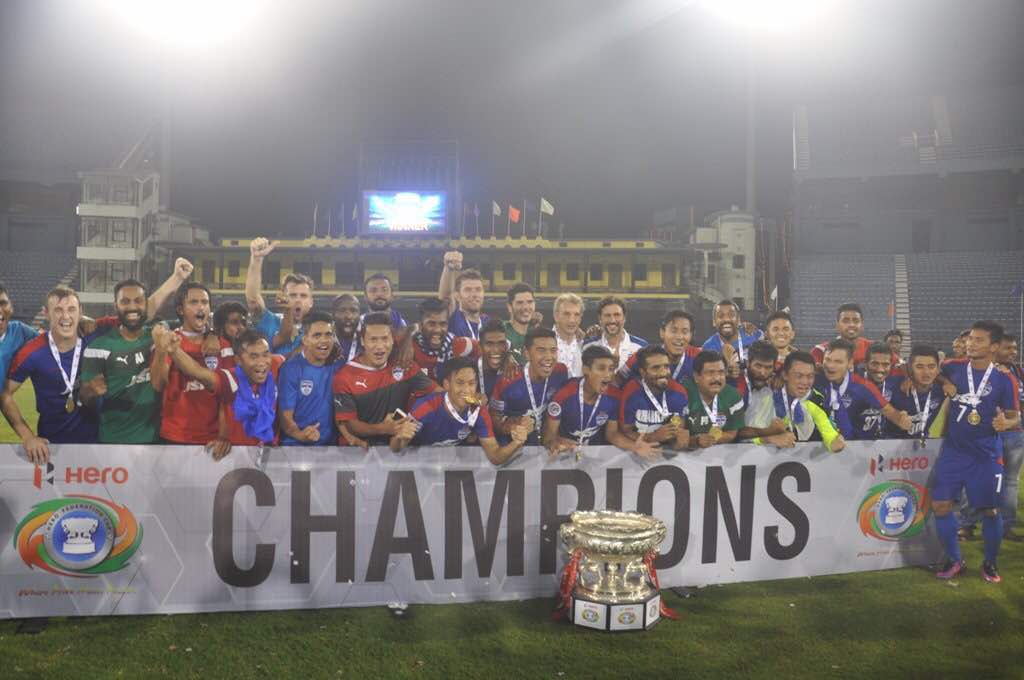
Bengaluru FC players celebrating the Federation Cup win in 2017

Type	Competition	Titles	Seasons
Domestic	I-League/ISL (Note: From 2017–18 season until 2021–22 season, I-League and Indian Super League shared joint top flight status in Indian Football. Following the Indian football roadmap, Indian Super League become the sole top-tier league in the country from 2022–23 season and I-League become second tier.)	3	2013–14, 2015–16, 2018–19
Domestic	Federation Cup	2	2014–15, 2016–17
Domestic	Super Cup	1	2018
Domestic	Durand Cup	1	2022
Regional	Puttaiah Memorial Cup	1	2014

=== Continental ===
- AFC Champions League 2
  - Runner-up (1): 2016

=== Awards ===
- AFC Champions League 2
  - Fair Play Award: 2016

=== Youth team ===
- Reliance Foundation Development League
  - Champions (3): 2022, 2023, 2025–26
- BDFA Super Division
  - Champions (3): 2018–19, 2019–20, 2023–24
- Puttaiah Memorial Cup
  - Champions (1): 2018

== Club ranking ==
=== AFC club ranking ===
As of 22 May 2026

Rank	Team	Points
114	(China) Qingdao West Coast	1,342
115	(India) East Bengal FC	1,340
116	(India) Bengaluru FC	1,339
117	(Jordan) Al-Ramtha SC	1,337
118	(Japan) Sagan Tosu	1,336

=== World club ranking ===
As of 22 May 2026

Rank	Team	Points
1121	(Azerbaijan) Zirə	1339
1122	(Algeria) JSM Béjaïa	1339
1123	(India) Bengaluru FC	1339
1124	(Algeria) NC Magra	1339
1125	(France) Dijon	1339

== Continental record ==
=== AFC Cup/AFC Champions League Two ===
AFC Champions League Two results
Season	Round	Club		Home	Away	Aggregate
2015	Group E	(Maldives)	Maziya	2–1	2–1	2nd
2015	Group E	(Indonesia)	Persipura Jayapura	1–3	1–3	2nd
2015	Group E	(Singapore)	Warriors	1–0	1–0	2nd
2015	Round of 16	(Hong Kong)	South China	0–2		
2016	Group H	(Laos)	Lao Toyota FC	2–1	1–2	2nd
2016	Group H	(Malaysia)	Johor Darul Ta'zim	0–1	0–3	2nd
2016	Group H	(Myanmar)	Ayeyawady United	5–3	1–0	2nd
2016	Round of 16	(Hong Kong)	Kitchee	3–2		
2016	Quarter final	(Singapore)	Tampines Rover	1–0	0–0	1–0
2016	Semi final	(Malaysia)	Johor Darul Ta'zim	3–1	1–1	4–2
2016	Final	(Iraq)	Al-Quwa Al-Jawiya	0–1 (Note: The final took place in Doha, Qatar because Iraqi clubs were not allowed to host matches due to security concerns)		
2017	Group E	(India)	Mohun Bagan SG	2–1	1–3	1st
2017	Group E	(Maldives)	Maziya	1–0	1–0	1st
2017	Group E	(Bangladesh)	Abahani Limited Dhaka	2–0	0–2	1st
2017	Inter-zone semi-finals	(North Korea)	April 25	3–0	0–0	3–0
2017	Inter-zone final	(Tajikistan)	Istiklol	2–2	0–1	2–3
2018	Preliminary round	(Bhutan)	Transport United	3–0	0–0	3–0
2018	Play-off round	(Maldives)	T.C. Sports Club	5–0	3–2	8–2
2018	Group E	(Bangladesh)	Abahani Limited Dhaka	1–0	4–0	1st
2018	Group E	(India)	Aizawl	5–0	3–1	1st
2018	Group E	(Maldives)	New Radiant	1–0	0–2	1st
2018	Inter-zone semi-finals	(Turkmenistan)	Altyn Asyr	2–3	0–2	2–5
2020	Preliminary round 2	(Bhutan)	Paro	9–1	1–0	10–1
2020	Play-off round	(Maldives)	Maziya	3–2	1–2	4–4 (3–4 p)
2021	Preliminary round 2	(Nepal)	Tribhuvan Army	5–0		
2021	Play-off round	(Maldives)	Eagles	1–0		
2021	Group D	(India)	Mohun Bagan SG	0–2		3rd
2021	Group D	(Bangladesh)	Bashundhara	0–0		3rd
2021	Group D	(Maldives)	Maziya	6–2		3rd

== eSports ==
The organizers of ISL introduced eISL, a FIFA video game tournament for the ISL playing clubs, each represented by two players. Bengaluru FC hosted a series of qualifying games for all the participants wanting to represent the club in eISL. On 20 November the club announced signing of the two players.

=== Roster ===
Bengaluru FC eSports FIFA roster
Players	Coaches
Handle / Name / Nationality; Harshil / Harshil, Dewani / India	Head coach: Vacant
Legend: (I) Inactive; (S) Suspended; Substitute; (injured) Injury / Illness	Latest roster transaction: 9 September 2024.

== Affiliated clubs ==
The following clubs are affiliated with Bengaluru FC:

- (Scotland) Rangers FC
- (India) Rangdajied United FC

== See also ==
- List of Bengaluru FC players
- List of Bengaluru FC seasons
- List of Bengaluru FC records and statistics
- Indian football clubs in Asian competitions
- Bengaluru FC Futsal
- Bengaluru FC (women)
- Bengaluru FC Reserves and Academy
