= Menno Koch =

Dutch footballer

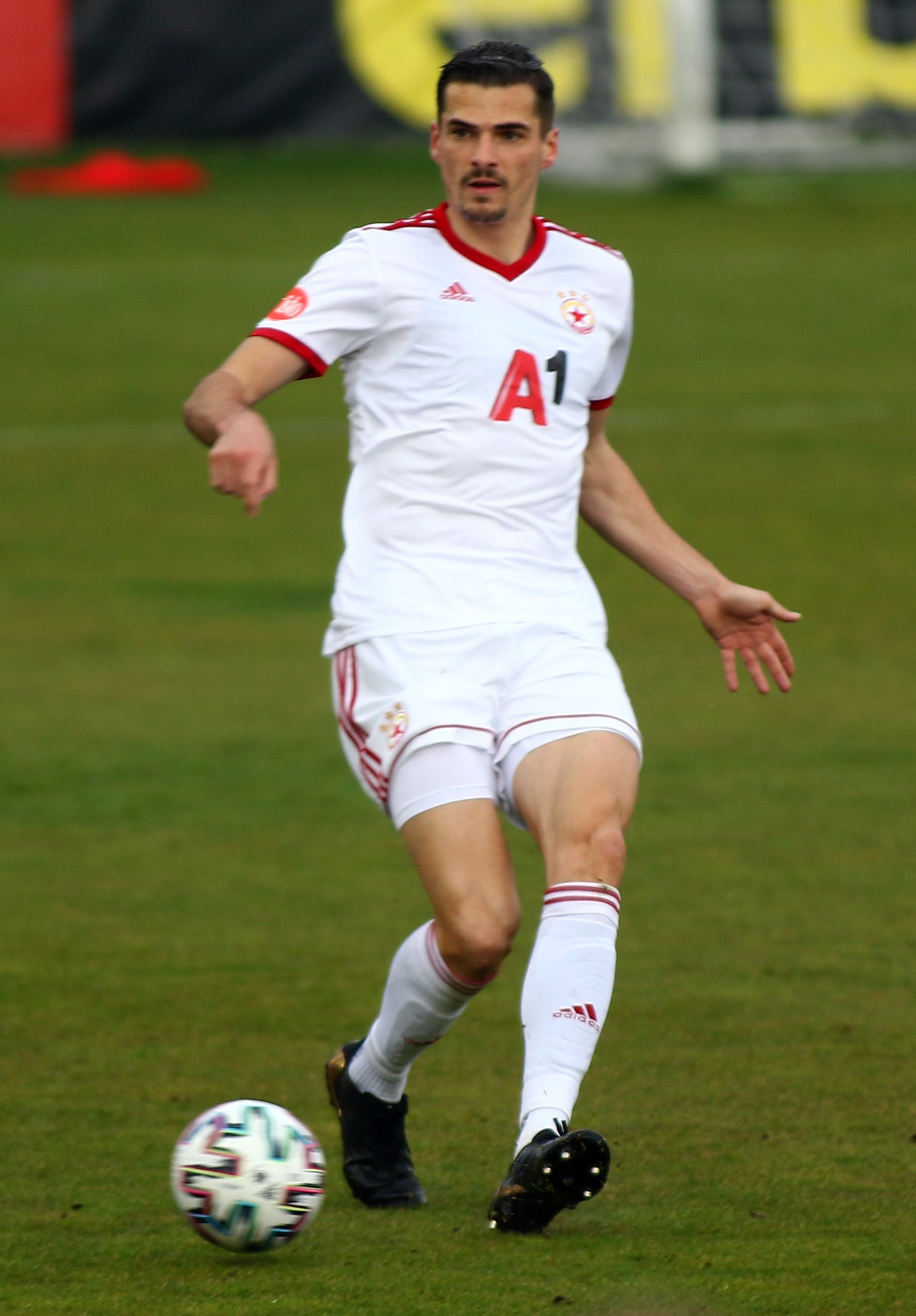
- Koch in 2021

Personal information
- Full name: Menno Robert Maria Koch
- Date of birth: 2 July 1994 (age 32)
- Place of birth: Heeze, Netherlands
- Height: 1.95 m (6 ft 5 in)
- Position: Centre back

Team information
- Current team: Bengaluru
- Number: 3

Youth career
- RKSV Heeze
- –2012: PSV

Senior career*
Years	Team	Apps	(Gls)
2012–2017	PSV	1	(0)
2015	→ NAC Breda (loan)	10	(0)
2016–2017	→ Utrecht (loan)	5	(0)
2017–2019	NAC Breda	46	(3)
2019–2021	Eupen	40	(3)
2021–2024	CSKA Sofia	62	(6)
2024–2026	Sarpsborg 08	54	(2)
2026–	Bengaluru	3	(1)

International career^{‡}
2010	Netherlands U16	1	(0)
2010–2011	Netherlands U17	4	(0)
2011–2012	Netherlands U18	2	(0)
2012–2013	Netherlands U19	5	(0)
2013	Netherlands U20	1	(0)
Medal record
Men's football
Representing Netherlands
UEFA European Under-17 Championship
Winner	2011 Serbia
- * Club domestic league appearances and goals as of 30 October 2026 ‡ National team caps and goals as of 17 October 2013

Menno Koch (born 2 July 1994) is a Dutch professional footballer who plays as a centre-back for Indian Super League club Bengaluru. Besides the Netherlands, he has played in Belgium and Bulgaria.

== Career ==
Koch was born in Heeze. He made his professional debut as Jong PSV player in the Eerste Divisie on 3 August 2013 against Sparta Rotterdam. He scored the 2–2 equalizer with his head in the 76th minute. On 25 February 2021, Koch signed a 3.5-year contract with CSKA Sofia. In June 2024, he left the team upon the expiration of his contract.

== Career statistics ==
=== Club ===
As of matches played 10 October 2026

Appearances and goals by club, season and competition
Club	Season	League			Cup		Continental		Other		Total	
Club	Season	Division	Apps	Goals	Apps	Goals	Apps	Goals	Apps	Goals	Apps	Goals
Jong PSV	2011–12	Beloften Eredivisie	3	1	—		—		—		3	1
Jong PSV	2012–13	Beloften Eredivisie	18	4	—		—		—		18	4
Jong PSV	2013–14	Eerste Divisie	34	8	—		—		—		34	8
Jong PSV	2014–15	Beloften Eredivisie	12	2	—		—		—		12	2
Jong PSV	2015–16	Eerste Divisie	16	2	—		—		—		16	2
Jong PSV	2016–17	Eerste Divisie	7	0	—		—		—		7	0
Jong PSV	Total		90	17	—		—		—		90	17
PSV	2012–13	Eredivisie	0	0	0	0	0	0	—		0	0
PSV	2013–14	Eredivisie	0	0	0	0	0	0	—		0	0
PSV	2014–15	Eredivisie	1	0	0	0	0	0	—		1	0
PSV	2015–16	Eredivisie	0	0	0	0	0	0	—		0	0
PSV	2016–17	Eredivisie	0	0	0	0	0	0	1	0	1	0
PSV	Total		1	0	0	0	0	0	1	0	1	0
NAC Breda (loan)	2014–15	Eredivisie	10	0	—		—		—		10	0
Utrecht (loan)	2016–17	Eredivisie	5	0	—		—		—		5	0
Jong Utrecht (loan)	2016–17	Eerste Divisie	5	0	—		—		—		5	0
NAC Breda	2017–18	Eredivisie	13	1	1	0	—		—		14	1
NAC Breda	2018–19	Eredivisie	33	2	0	0	—		—		33	2
NAC Breda	Total		46	3	1	0	—		—		47	3
Jong NAC Breda	2017–18	Beloften Eredivisie	3	1	1	0	—		—		4	1
Eupen	2019–20	Belgian First Division A	23	1	1	0	—		—		24	1
Eupen	2020–21	Belgian First Division A	17	2	1	1	—		—		18	3
Eupen	Total		40	3	2	1	—		—		42	4
CSKA Sofia	2020–21	Bulgarian First League	13	2	5	0	—		—		18	2
CSKA Sofia	2021–22	Bulgarian First League	13	1	4	0	0	0	0	0	17	1
CSKA Sofia	2022–23	Bulgarian First League	18	3	2	0	5	0	0	0	25	3
CSKA Sofia	2023–24	Bulgarian First League	18	0	1	0	2	0	—		21	0
CSKA Sofia	Total		62	6	12	0	7	0	0	0	81	6
Sarpsborg 08	2024	Eliteserien	16	1	0	0	—		—		16	1
Sarpsborg 08	2025	Eliteserien	29	0	5	0	—		—		34	0
Sarpsborg 08	2026	Eliteserien	9	0	0	0	—		—		9	0
Sarpsborg 08	Total		54	1	5	0	0	0	0	0	59	1
Bengaluru	2026–27	Indian Super League	1	1	0	0	—		—		1	1
Career total			317	32	20	2	7	0	1	0	352	33

=== International ===
Appearances and goals by national team and year
National team	Year	Competitive		Friendly		Total	
National team	Year	Apps	Goals	Apps	Goals	Apps	Goals
Netherlands U16	2010	0	0	1	0	1	0
Netherlands U17	2010	1 (Note: Appearance in 2011 UEFA European Under-17 Championship qualifying round)	0	1	0	2	0
Netherlands U17	2011	2 (Note: One appearance in 2011 UEFA European Under-17 Championship and one appearance in 2011 FIFA U-17 World Cup)	0	0	0	2	0
Netherlands U17	Total	3	0	1	0	4	0
Netherlands U18	2011	0	0	1	0	1	0
Netherlands U18	2012	0	0	1	0	1	0
Netherlands U18	Total	0	0	2	0	2	0
Netherlands U19	2012	2 (Note: Appearances in 2013 UEFA European Under-19 Championship qualification)	0	1	0	3	0
Netherlands U19	2013	0	0	1	0	1	0
Netherlands U19	Total	2	0	2	0	4	0
Netherlands U20	2013	0	0	1	0	1	0
Total		5	0	7	0	12	0

== Honours ==
CSKA Sofia

- Bulgarian Cup: 2020–21

Netherlands U17

- UEFA European Under-17 Championship: 2011
