= Sandro Sakho =

Portuguese footballer

Personal information
- Full name: Sandro Sene Aníbal Embaló
- Date of birth: 1 May 1996 (age 30)
- Place of birth: Lisbon, Portugal
- Height: 1.87 m (6 ft 2 in)
- Position: Centre-back

Team information
- Current team: Bengaluru
- Number: 6

Youth career
- 2005–2010: Alverca
- 2010–2012: Sporting CP
- 2012–2013: Braga
- 2014: União Leiria
- 2015: Atlético Madrid
- 2015–2016: Genoa

Senior career*
Years	Team	Apps	(Gls)
2016–2017	Genoa	0	(0)
2018	Kalev	14	(0)
2018–2019	Ermis Aradippou	10	(0)
2019	Vitória Setúbal B	9	(0)
2019	Fátima	0	(0)
2020–2021	Dulwich Hamlet	7	(0)
2021	Olympias Lympion		
2022	Oulu	10	(1)
2023–2024	Al-Qaisumah	25	(1)
2024–2025	Persita Tangerang	16	(1)
2025–2026	PSBS Biak	24	(1)
2026–	Bengaluru	1	(0)
- * Club domestic league appearances and goals as of 30 October 2026

Sandro Sene Aníbal Embaló (born 1 May 1996), commonly known as Sandro Sakho, is a Portuguese professional footballer who plays as a centre-back for Indian Super League club Bengaluru.

== Career ==
On 25 August 2018, Sakho made his professional debut with Ermis Aradippou in a 2018–19 Cypriot First Division match against AEL Limassol.

On 18 November 2021, he signed with Oulu in Finland.

On 12 July 2023, Sandro joined Saudi First Division League side Al-Qaisumah.

== Personal life ==
Sakho is of Bissau-Guinean descent.

== Career statistics ==
As of match played 21 April 2025

Club	Season	League			Cup (Note: Includes Taça de Portugal, King's Cup, Liigacup)		Continental		Total	
Club	Season	Division	Apps	Goals	Apps	Goals	Apps	Goals	Apps	Goals
Tallinna Kalev	2018	Meistriliiga	14	0	–		–		14	0
Ermis Aradippou	2018–19	Cypriot First Division	10	0	–		–		10	0
Fátima	2019–20	Campeonato de Portugal	0	0	1	0	–		1	0
Dulwich Hamlet	2020–21	National League South	7	0	–		–		7	0
Olympias Lympion	2021–22	Cypriot Second Division	0	0	–		–		0	0
Oulu	2022	Veikkausliiga	10	1	3	0	–		13	1
Al-Qaisumah	2023–24	Saudi First Division League	25	1	1	0	–		26	1
Persita Tangerang	2024–25	Indonesian Super League	15	1	–		–		15	1
PSBS Biak	2025–26	Indonesian Super League	24	1	–		–		24	1
Bengaluru FC	2026–27	Indian Super League	0	0	–		–		0	0
Career total			105	4	5	0	0	0	110	4
