= Borja Martínez (footballer, born 1994) =

Spanish footballer

Personal information
- Full name: Borja Martínez Giner
- Date of birth: 2 March 1994 (age 32)
- Place of birth: Alicante, Spain
- Height: 1.73 m (5 ft 8 in)
- Position: Winger

Team information
- Current team: Bengaluru
- Number: 7

Youth career
- 2001–2004: Terra Alacant
- 2004–2012: Hércules

Senior career*
Years	Team	Apps	(Gls)
2011–2013	Hércules B	17	(3)
2013	Hércules	6	(0)
2013–2016	Espanyol B	41	(2)
2014–2015	→ Cultural Leonesa (loan)	34	(5)
2016–2017	Lorca	23	(0)
2017–2018	Ebro	35	(4)
2018–2019	Elche	21	(1)
2019–2021	Hércules	36	(5)
2020	→ Ibiza (loan)	6	(0)
2021–2023	Sanse	66	(11)
2023–2024	Teruel	36	(9)
2024–2025	Intercity	34	(2)
2025–2026	Alcorcón	33	(3)
2026–	Bengaluru	3	(2)
- * Club domestic league appearances and goals as of 30 October 2026

Borja Martínez Giner (born 2 March 1994), known as simply Borja (Valencian pronunciation: [ˈbɔɾdʒa]), is a Spanish footballer who plays as a left winger for Indian Super League club Bengaluru.

== Club career ==
Born in Alicante, Valencian Community, Borja joined Hércules CF's youth system in 2004 at the age of 10, and started playing as a senior with the reserves in the regional divisions. He made his professional debut with the first team on 20 January 2013, playing the last 17 minutes of the 3–0 home win against CD Lugo in the Segunda División championship.

On 12 July 2013, Borja signed a 2+2 contract with RCD Espanyol, being assigned to the B-team in Segunda División B. On 11 August of the following year he moved to Cultural y Deportiva Leonesa, in the same division.

On 23 July 2016, Borja moved to Lorca FC also in the third tier. The following 11 July, after helping the club in their first promotion ever to the second division, he joined CD Ebro.

On 28 June 2018, Borja signed for Elche CF in the second level. On 14 August of the following year, after contributing with only one goal during the campaign, he cut ties with the club.

On 21 June 2024, Borja signed with Intercity in Primera Federación.

== Career statistics ==
As of match played 21 April 2025

Club	Season	League			Cup (Note: Includes Copa del Rey)		Continental		Others		Total	
Club	Season	Division	Apps	Goals	Apps	Goals	Apps	Goals	Apps	Goals	Apps	Goals
Hércules	2012–13	Segunda División	6	0	–		–		–		6	0
Espanyol B	2013–14	Segunda División B	29	2	–		–		–		29	2
Espanyol B	2014–15	Segunda División B	0	0	–		–		–		0	0
Espanyol B	2015–16	Segunda División B	12	0	–		–		–		12	0
Espanyol B	Total		41	2	0	0	0	0	0	0	41	2
Cultural Leonesa (loan)	2014–15	Segunda División B	34	5	–		–		–		34	5
Lorca	2016–17	Segunda División B	23	0	2	0	–		2 (Note: Appearances in Segunda División B play-offs)	0	27	0
Ebro	2017–18	Segunda División B	35	4	–		–		–		35	4
Elche	2018–19	Segunda División	21	1	2	0	–		–		23	1
Hércules	2019–20	Segunda División B	19	3	1	0	–		–		20	3
Hércules	2020–21	Segunda División B	17	2	–		–		1	0	18	2
Hércules	Total		36	5	1	0	0	0	1	0	38	5
Ibiza (loan)	2019–20	Segunda División B	6	0	–		–		1	0	7	0
Sanse	2021–22	Primera Federación	29	5	2	0	–		–		31	5
Sanse	2022–23	Primera Federación	37	4	–		–		–		37	4
Sanse	Total		66	9	2	0	0	0	0	0	68	9
Teruel	2023–24	Primera Federación	36	9	1	0	–		–		37	9
Intercity	2024–25	Primera Federación	34	2	–		–		–		34	2
Alcorcón	2025–26	Primera Federación	33	3	–		–		–		33	3
Bengaluru	2026–27	Indian Super League	0	0	0	0	–		–		0	0
Career total			371	40	8	0	0	0	4	0	383	40
