= Basava Raja =

Basava Raja or Basava Bhoopāla (r. 1684–1710) was a chief of the kingdom of Keladi (Ikkeri) in south-west India. He is known as the author of the long and varied Sanskrit poem Śiva Tattva Ratnākara which, among other subjects, discusses Indian music and cookery.
