= Manuel de Iriondo =

Argentine footballer

Personal information
- Full name: Manuel Ignacio de Iriondo
- Date of birth: 6 May 1993 (age 33)
- Place of birth: Santa Fe, Argentina
- Height: 1.79 m (5 ft 10 in)
- Position: Defensive midfielder

Team information
- Current team: Bengaluru

Youth career
- –2013: Rafaela

Senior career*
Years	Team	Apps	(Gls)
2013–2014	Rafaela	0	(0)
2014–2020	Unión	50	(0)
2019	→ Olimpo (loan)	12	(0)
2020–2021	Politehnica Iași	47	(2)
2021–2022	Grenoble	17	(0)
2022–2023	Rayo Majadahonda	27	(0)
2023–2025	Ethnikos Achna	58	(8)
2025–2026	Krasava Ypsonas	24	(0)
2026–	Bengaluru	3	(0)
- * Club domestic league appearances and goals as of 30 October 2026

Manuel Ignacio de Iriondo (born 6 May 1993) is an Argentine professional footballer who plays as a defensive midfielder for Indian Super League club Bengaluru.

== Career ==
On 29 July 2021, de Iriondo signed a two-year contract with French Ligue 2 club Grenoble. On 26 July 2022, the contract was terminated by mutual consent. The following day, he signed for Spanish Primera Federación club Rayo Majadahonda.
