= Pep Muñoz =

Spanish football manager (born 1979)

Personal information
- Full name: José Muñoz Zoyo
- Date of birth: 2 August 1979 (age 47)
- Place of birth: Terrassa, Spain

Team information
- Current team: Bengaluru (manager)

Managerial career
- Years: Team
- 2004–2006: Lleida (fitness coach)
- 2008–2012: Lleida (youth)
- 2012–2015: Barcelona (U19 assistant)
- 2015–2016: Barcelona B (assistant)
- 2016–2019: Qingdao FC (assistant)
- 2019–2022: Shandong Taishan (assistant)
- 2022–2023: China (assistant)
- 2023–2025: Svay Rieng
- 2025–2026: Shenzhen Peng City
- 2026–: Bengaluru

José Muñoz Zoyo (born 2 August 1979) is a Spanish professional football manager who manages Bengaluru.

== Career ==
During the summer of 2011, he was appointed as an assistant manager of the under-19 team of Spanish La Liga side Barcelona, helping them win the 2013–14 UEFA Youth League. Subsequently, he was appointed as an assistant manager of the China national football team.

Ahead of the 2023–24 season, he was appointed manager of Cambodian side Svay Rieng, helping the club win the league title. Two years later, he was appointed manager of Chinese side Shenzhen Peng City, before being appointed manager of Indian side Bengaluru in 2026.

== Personal life ==
Muñoz was born on 2 August 1979. Born in Terrassa, Spain, he obtained a UEFA Pro License.

== Managerial statistics ==
As of match played 21 May 2026

Managerial record by team and tenure
Team	From	To	Record							
Team	From	To	M	W	D	L	GF	GA	GD	Win %
(Cambodia) Svay Rieng	6 May 2023	20 May 2025	75	56	7	12	206	83	+123	74.67
(China) Shenzhen Peng City	11 July 2025	30 September 2025	10	2	0	8	13	20	−7	20.00
(India) Bengaluru	16 Match 2026	Present	6	2	3	1	8	7	+1	33.33
Total			91	60	10	21	227	110	+117	65.93

== Honours ==
Svay Rieng

- Cambodian Premier League: 2023–24, 2024–25
- Cambodian Super Cup: 2024
- AFC Challenge League runners-up: 2024–25

Individual

- 2023–24 Cambodian League 'Coach of the Season'
- 2024–25 Cambodian League 'Coach of the Season'
