= Gandabherunda =

Two-headed bird form of Hindu god Vishnu

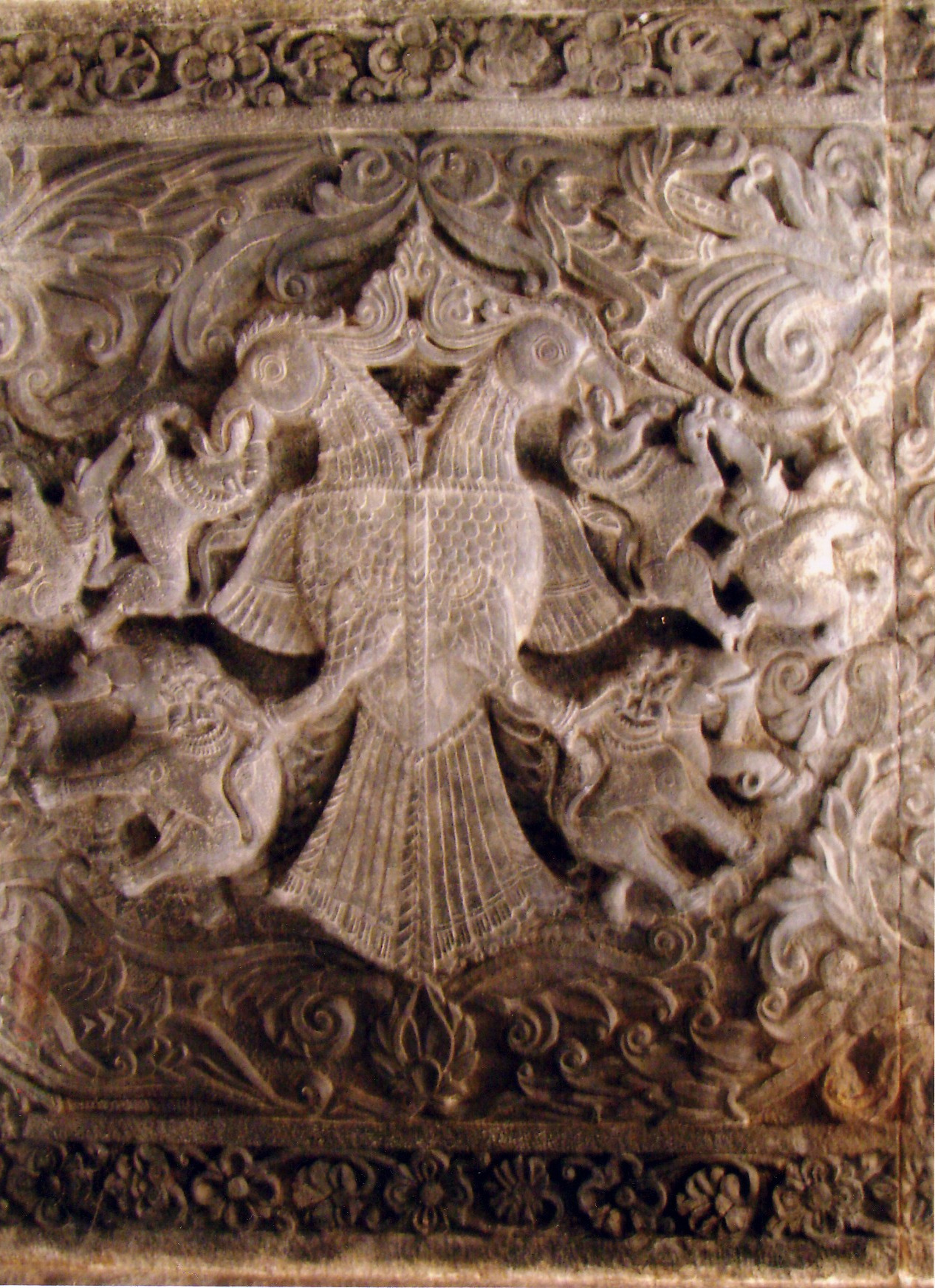
Gandabherunda as a roof statue, Rameshvara temple, Keladi

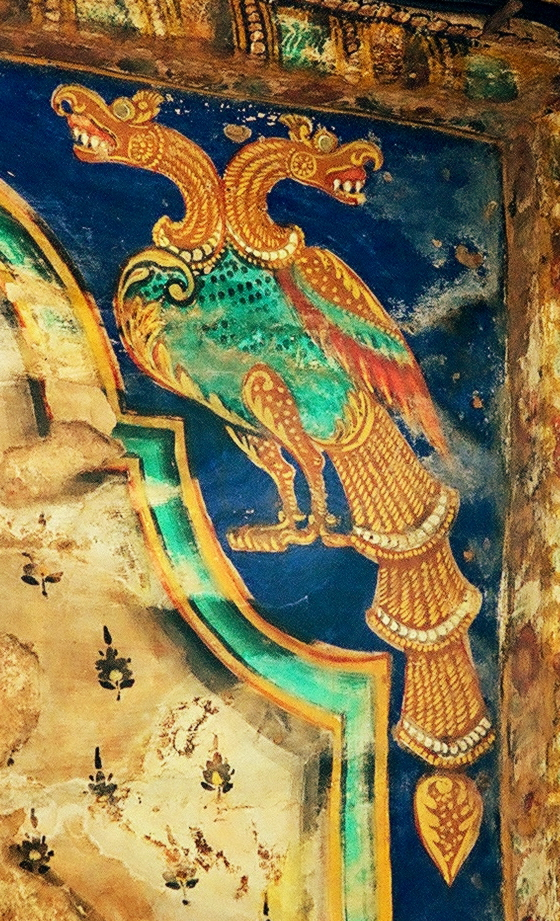
Gandabherunda in a decorative painting, Brihadishvara Temple, Thanjavur

Left: Gandabherunda in a roof statue, Rameshvara temple, Keladi. Right: Gandabherunda in a decorative painting, Brihadishvara Temple, Thanjavur.

Gandabherunda (IAST: Gaṇḍabheruṇḍa) is a regional form of Vishnu in Vaishnavism. According to Sri Vaishnava authors, Narasimha, an avatar of Vishnu, assumes this form of a double-headed eagle to subdue Sharabha, a form of Shiva.

== Depiction ==
The two headed eagle is holding two elephants in his claws and beaks, revealing his enormous powers. In a coin found in Madurai, he is holding a snake in his beak. All 2-dimensional depictions show a symmetrical image in which he is a double-headed eagle while other images show his long tail feathers like a peafowl. In the Chennakeshava Temple, Beluru, Karnataka, Gandabherunda as a two headed eagle is carved in a scene of chain of destruction, which results in the destruction of the universe. Gandabherunda is a form of Narasimha, the fourth incarnation of Vishnu in the Dashavatara of Vishnu and he disemboweled and killed both Sharabha and Hiranyakashipu at the same time.

== Legend ==
After Narasimha disemboweled and killed the asura king Hiranyakashipu, he burned and killed all other asuras and won over them. In the original story of this incident, the asura king Hiranyakashipu and the asura queen Kayudhu's son Prahlada prayed to him along with the devas and devis and celebrated him, after which Narasimha went to Vaikuntha.

== Usage ==
The Vijayanagaram emperor Harihara II installed Yaduraya Wodeyar as first king of Mysore as his vassal in 1399 to suppress the opposition of the Dalavays. The Dalavays were a decommissioned clan of royal fighters, advisers, and ministers who were active in the Vijayanagaram Empire before, during and after Harihara II and Yaduraya. Vijayanagaram Empire's coat of arms is Gandabherunda sculpted is found on the roof of the Rameshwara temple in the temple town of Keladi in Shimoga District, the capital of the Keladi Nayakas. Gandabherunda is used by the Kingdom of Mysore as a royal emblem of Wodeyar rulers under Vijayanagaram Empire. Then Mughal rulers Tippu Sultan and European countries rulers introduced guns and conquered the Kingdom. Government of Karnataka has Gandabherunda as a state symbol and is found on bus terminals and tickets issued by Karnataka State Road Transport Corporation. Gold Coins from the reign of Achyuta Deva Raya is the first to use Gandabherunda on coins. The crests of the Indian Navy ships named INS Mysore - INS Mysore (C60) and INS Mysore (D60) depicts Gandabherunda. Indian navy's "stitched sail" ship INSV Kaundinya's sails also depict the motif.

The Gandaberunda is very similar in design to the double-headed eagle used in Western heraldry, used as a symbol by Albania, Serbia, Montenegro and Russia in their respective coats of arms, and as an emblem by a number of Orthodox Christian churches, including the Greek Orthodox Church and the Orthodox Autocephalous Church of Albania.

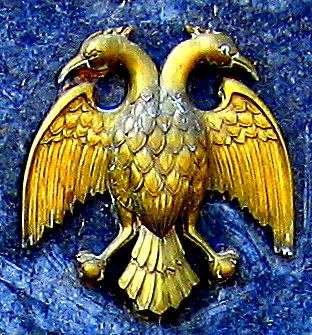
Gandabherunda as emblem on Mysore Palace.

Gandabherunda as emblem on Emblem of Karnataka, India.

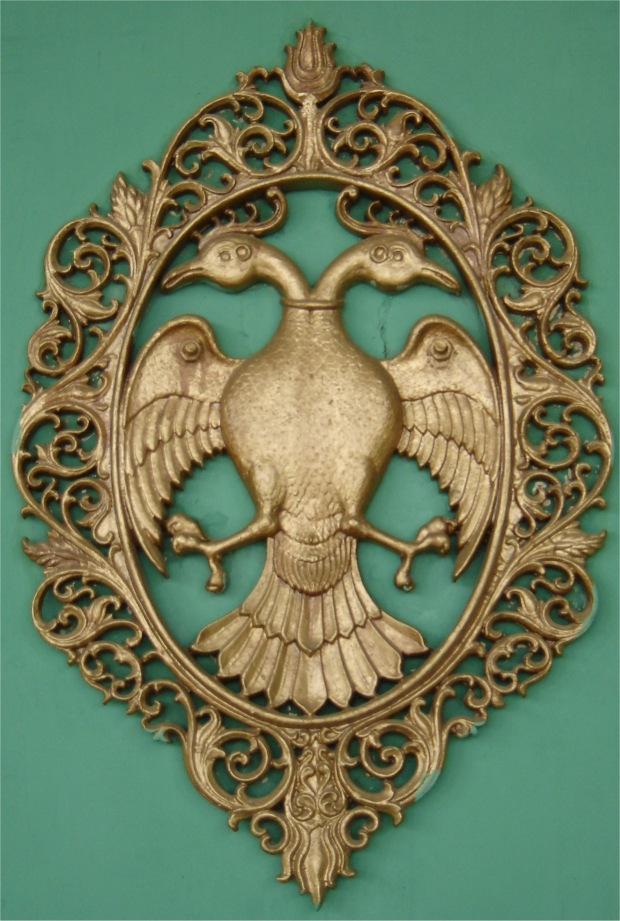
Gandabherunda as emblem on Lalita Mahal Palace Hotel, Mysore.

== In popular culture ==
Gandu Bherunda is a Kannada film directed by S. V. Rajendrasingha Babu and produced by Vajramuni. The playwright of the movie was the celebrated writer, H.V. Subba Rao. The film was released in 1984. The music was composed by Sathyam. Bollywood actor Amrish Puri played the antagonist in the film.

== See also ==
- Garuda
- Pratyangira
- Roc (mythology)
- Yali
- Double-headed eagle
