= Shivaldo Singh =

Indian footballer (born 2004)

Personal information
- Full name: Shivaldo Singh Chingangbam
- Date of birth: 13 June 2004 (age 22)
- Place of birth: Awang Potsangbam, Imphal, Manipur, India
- Height: 1.72 m (5 ft 8 in)
- Position: Midfielder

Team information
- Current team: Bengaluru
- Number: 51

Youth career
- 2021–23: RF Young Champs
- 2023–24: Bengaluru U23

Senior career*
Years	Team	Apps	(Gls)
2023–	Bengaluru	16	(1)

International career^{‡}
2024–	India U23	7	(2)
- * Club domestic league appearances and goals as of 22:00, 7 March 2026 (UTC) ‡ National team caps and goals as of 22:00, 6 September 2025 (UTC)

Shivaldo Singh Chingangbam (Meitei: Chingangbam Shivaldo Singh, born 13 June 2004) is an Indian professional footballer who plays as a midfielder for the Indian Super League club Bengaluru.

== Club career ==
=== Bengaluru ===
Singh started his youth training and career with RF Young Champs in 2021. Next year he moved to Bengaluru's youth team. He played two seasons at the Development League. For 2023–24 he was promoted to the senior team of Bengaluru. He made his senior debut against Mumbai City on 8 December 2023. On 14 March 2024, he scored a goal in a 2–1 victory against Goa. He also represented the club at the 2024 Super Cup. However, his performance dropped and made limited appearances in 2024–25.

== International career ==
In March 2024, Singh got his call-ups for India under-23 camp for preparation of two friendlies that India would play against Malaysia. He made it to final squad, and played both the friendlies. He scored his first international goal for India under-23 team in the first friendly, though lost the match 2–1 to Malaysia. In May 2025, then India under-23 head coach Naushad Moosa listed Singh again in the 29-members probable squad for two friendlies that will be held in Tajikistan in June 2025.

== Career statistics ==
=== Club ===
As of 25 May 2025

Appearances and goals by club, season and competition
Club	Season	League			Super Cup		Durand Cup		Continental		Total	
Club	Season	Division	Apps	Goals	Apps	Goals	Apps	Goals	Apps	Goals	Apps	Goal
Bengaluru	2023–24	Indian Super League	12	1	2	0	0	0	0	0	14	1
Bengaluru	2024–25	Indian Super League	3	0	0	0	4	0	0	0	7	0
Career total			15	1	2	0	4	0	0	0	21	1
