= Bettahalasur =

Bettahalasur Betthalsur
- village
- Location in Karnataka, India Bettahalasur (India)
- Coordinates: 13.16252°N 77.6090°E
- Country: India
- State: Karnataka
- District: Bangalore
- Talukas: Bangalore North

Government
  - Body: Village Panchayat

Languages
  - Official: Kannada
- Time zone: UTC+5:30 (IST)
- PIN: 562157
- Vehicle registration: KA 50
- Nearest city: Bangalore
- Civic agency: Village Panchayat

Bettahalasur is a census town in Bangalore Urban district in the Indian state of Karnataka. Bettahalasur is located 25 km from Majestic Bus Terminal and 16 km from Bangalore International Airport.

Bettahalasur was known for stone quarrying but recently the quarrying activity has been stopped.
