= Keladi =

- village
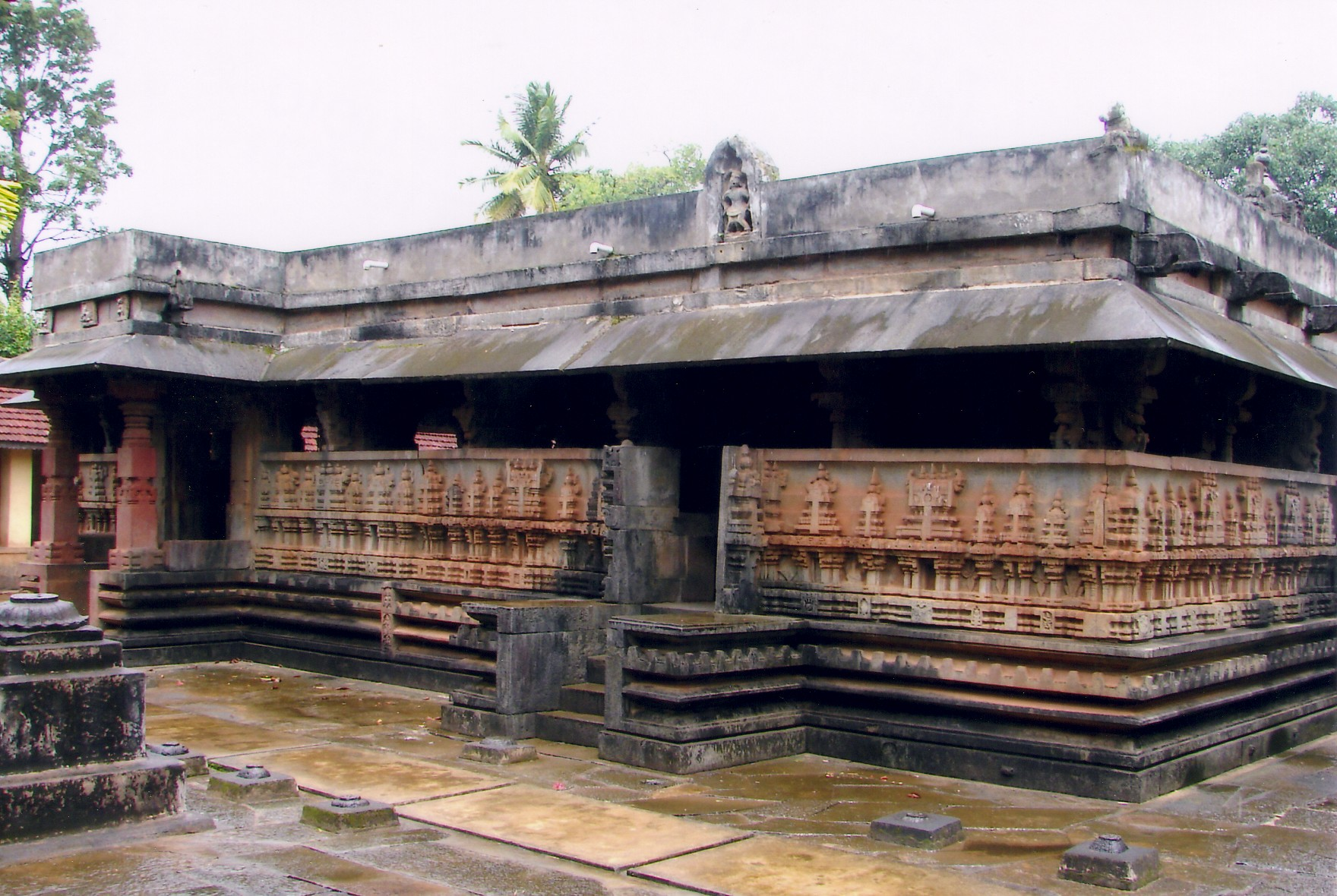
- Rameshwara Temple, Hoysala-Dravida style, Keladi Nayaka period

- Location in Karnataka, India Keladi (India)
- Coordinates: 14.2241°N 75.0164°E
- Country: India
- State: Karnataka
- District: Shivamogga

Government
  - Body: Nagar Palika

Languages
  - Official: Kannada
- Time zone: UTC+5:30 (IST)
- PIN: 577 443
- Telephone code: 08183
- ISO 3166 code: IN-KA
- Website: karnataka.gov.in

Keladi (Kannada: [keɭɐd̪i]) is a temple town in Sagara Taluk of the state of Karnataka in India. Keladi is located about 8 km from the town of Sagara.

== History ==
It is the place whence the Ikkeri chiefs derived their origin, which is thus related:

Two brothers named Chavuda Gowda and Bhadra Gowda, living in the village of Hale-bayal, in the Keladi taluk of the Chandragutti paragana, had two servants or slaves, named Yadava and Murari, who cultivated their masters' fields. A cow they had was discovered to shed her milk over a certain ant-hill, which, on digging into, Chavuda Gowda found, contained a linga, over which, therefore, he built a small temple. A little time after, the servants, when ploughing, turned up an old sword, which they put into the thatch of the house, intending to make a scythe of it. But they discovered that if a crow perched on the shed the sword leaped out in the form of a serpent and killed it. On this, Chavuda Gowda took it and, carefully cleaning it, kept in his house, giving it the name of Nagaramuri. At another time, the ploughshare struck against the ring of a cauldron, which contained treasure. Afraid to disturb it, Chavuda Gowda covered it up again, but that night had a dream, in which he was directed to offer a human sacrifice and take the treasure. On hearing this, his two slaves volunteered to be the victims on condition that their memory was preserved. All the preparations being made, the place was dug up at night and the slaves, after ablutions, prostrated themselves to the cauldron and were beheaded with the sword Nagaramuri.

With this accession of wealth, the Gowdas raised a small force and began to subdue the neighbouring villages. But they were seized and sent to Vijayanagar by order from the king, and there put into custody. Hearing that a Palegar near Balihalu was rebellious, they made an offer through the court musicians to punish him if allowed to do so. Permission being given, they went with a force and killed the Palegar, on which they were released and confirmed in the possession of the places they had captured, receiving from the king a seal (sikha moharu). The town of Keladi was then founded, together with the temple of Rameshwara.

One day while the Gauda was hunting, a hare turned upon his hounds, indicating heroic virtue in the soil of the place in which this occurred. He therefore removed his town to the spot, calling Ikkeri. His son and successor, with the sanction of Sadasiva Raya, the Vijayanagar sovereign, took the name of Sadasiva-Nayak.

Two mounds, called Kalte, at the entrance to Keladi are pointed out as the scene of the human sacrifices.

The principal building in the place is the double temple of Rameshwara and Virabhadra, a large and plain structure built in the Hoysala-Dravida style.

After the disintegration of Vijayanagar Empire in the Battle of Talikota, the Keladi Nayakas created an independent kingdom and it remained so until it was annexed to Mysore Kingdom by Hyder Ali.

Shivappa Nayaka, Chennamma and Basava Raja were the rulers of this kingdom.

== Image Gallery ==
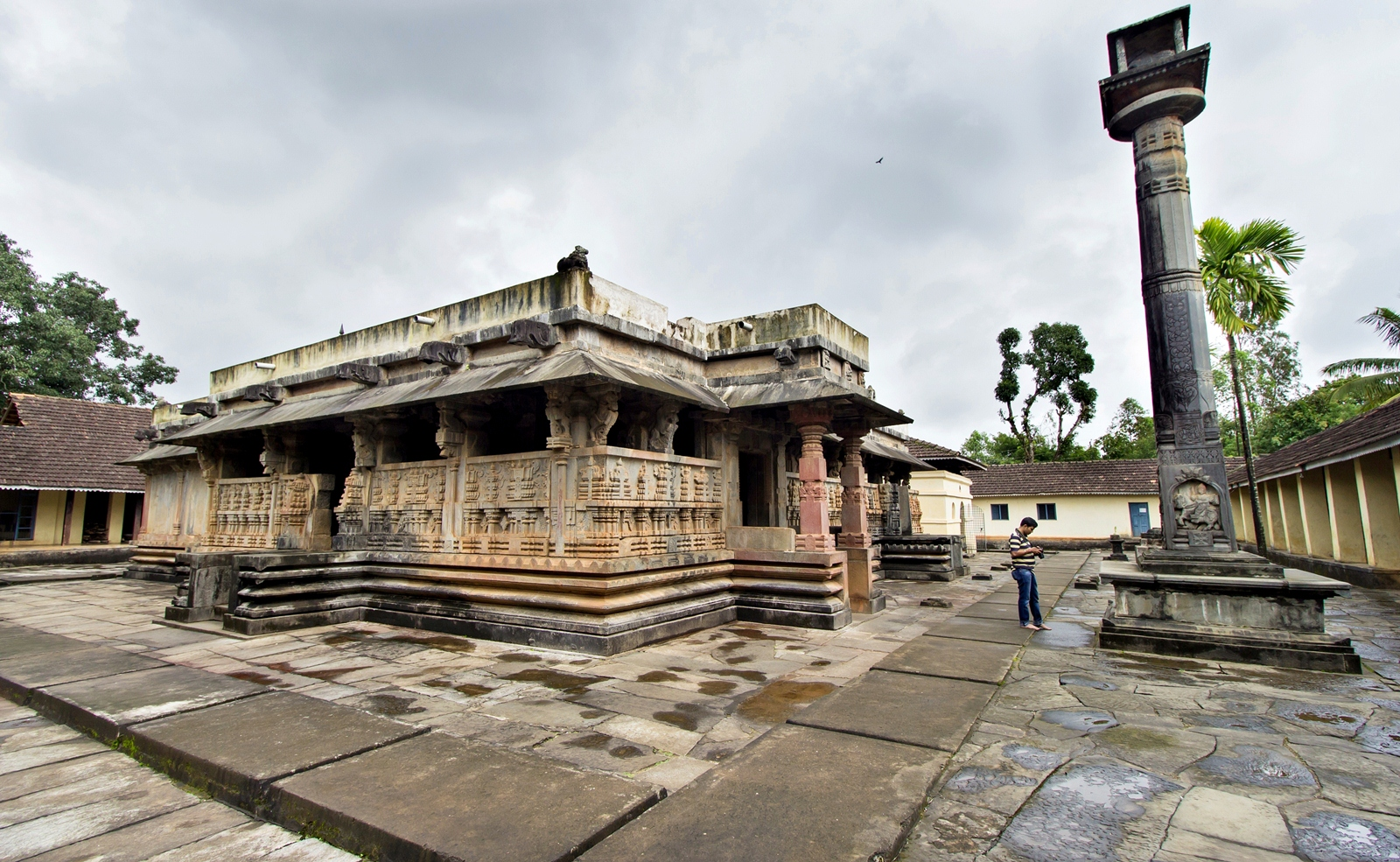
The wide and beautiful Rameshwara Temple

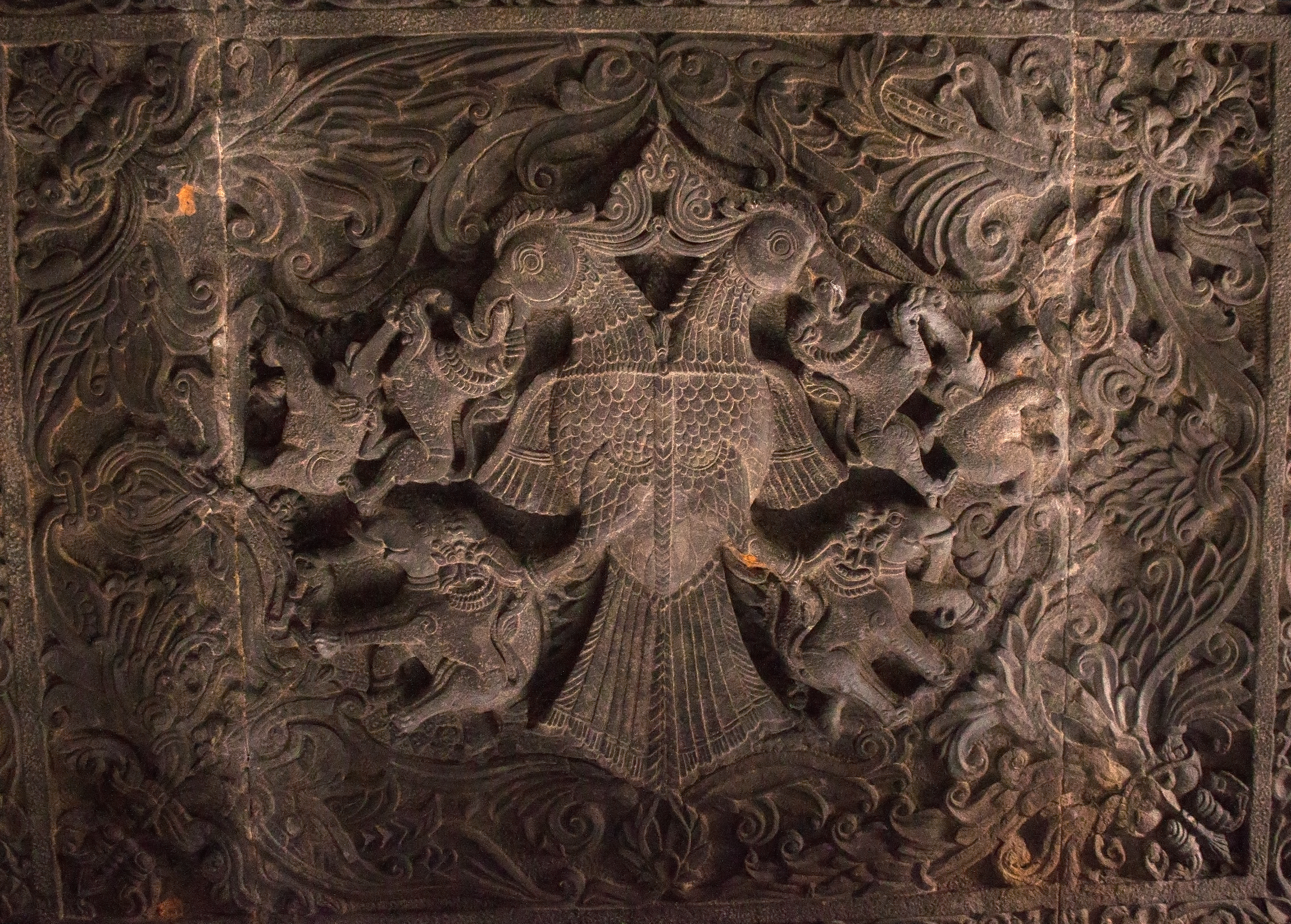
Carving inside the temple

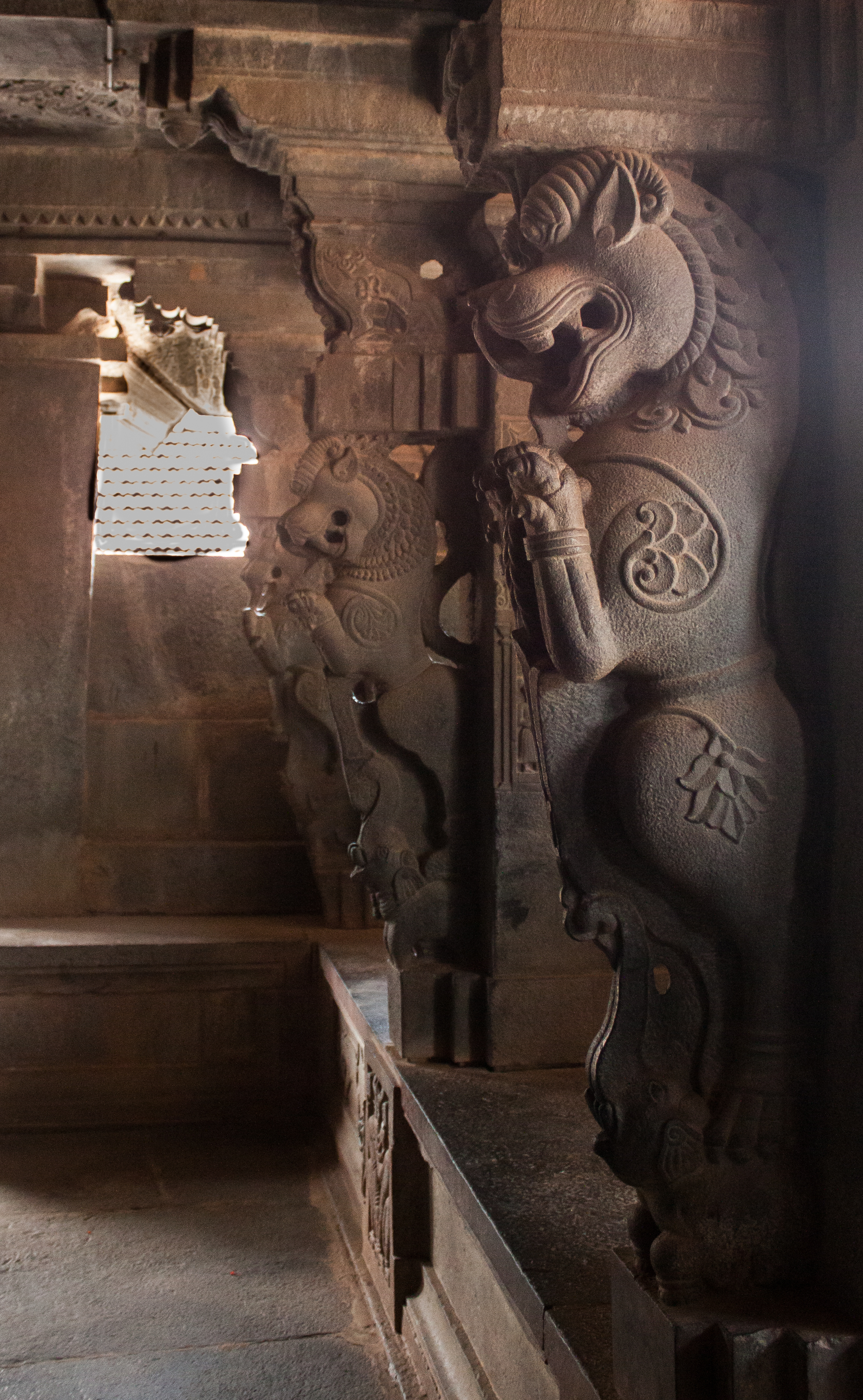
Stone Sculpture inside the temple

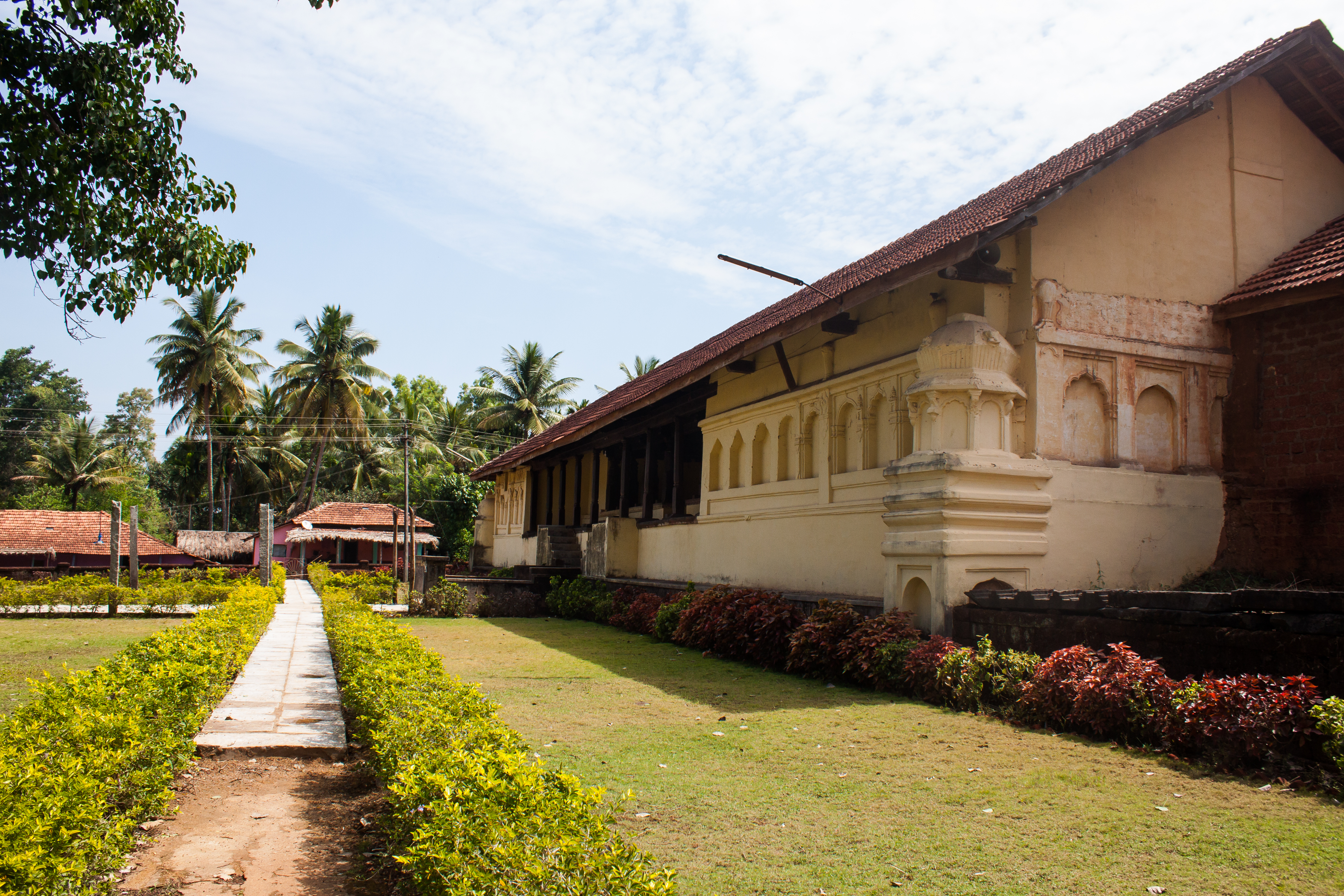
Exterior building surrounding the temple complex

== See also ==
- Keladi Nayaka
- Vijayanagara Empire
- Karnataka
