= 2021 Durand Cup knockout stage =

The 2021 Durand Cup knockout stage began on 23 September with the quarter-finals and ended on 3 October 2021 with the final at the Vivekananda Yuba Bharati Krirangan in Kolkata, West Bengal, to decide the champions of the 2021 Durand Cup. A total of 8 teams competed in the knockout phase.

== Qualified teams ==
The knockout stage involves the eight teams which qualified as winners and runners-up of each of the four groups in the group stage.

Group	Winners	Runners-Up
A	Bengaluru United	Mohammedan
B	Goa	Army Green
C	Bengaluru	Delhi
D	Gokulam Kerala	Army Red

: Indian Super League club
: I League club
: 2nd Division League club
: Indian Armed Forces team

== Schedule ==
The schedule was as follows.

Round	Dates
Quarter-finals	23–25 September 2021
Semi-finals	27–29 September 2021
Final	3 October 2021

== Bracket ==
Quarterfinals
Mohammedan	1
Gokulam Kerala	0
Army Red	-
Bengaluru United (w.o.)	-
Goa	5
Delhi	1
Bengaluru	3
Army Green	2

Semifinals
Mohammedan (a.e.t.)	4
Bengaluru United	2
Goa (p)	2(7)
Bengaluru	2(6)

Final
Mohammedan	0
Goa (a.e.t.)	1

== Quarter-finals ==
=== Summary ===
Team 1	Score	Team 2
Mohammedan	1–0	Gokulam Kerala
Army Red	w/o (Note: Army Red withdrew from their Durand Cup quarter final fixture against FC Bengaluru United after reports of positive COVID-19 cases were discovered within the squad.)	Bengaluru United
Goa	5–1	Delhi
Bengaluru	3–2	Army Green

=== Matches ===
23 September 2021 1st Quarterfinal	Mohammedan	1–0	Gokulam Kerala	Kolkata
14.00 IST	Joseph 44'	Report	Rashid (yellow card) 83'	Stadium: Vivekananda Yuba Bharati Krirangan; Attendance: 10000; Man of the Match: Zothanmawia (Mohammedan SC)

24 September 2021 2nd Quarterfinal	Army Red	w/o	Bengaluru United	Kalyani
14.00 IST		Report		Stadium: Kalyani Stadium
Note: Army Red withdrew from the quarterfinal fixture against FC Bengaluru United after reports of positive COVID-19 cases within the squad.

24 September 2021 3rd Quarterfinal	Goa	5–1	Delhi	Kalyani
14.00 IST	Murgaonkar 15'; Nemil 18'; Pereira (yellow card) 32'; Bedia (yellow card) 38'; Fernandes 45+3'; D'Cunha 84'; Jesuraj 90+2'	Report	Shaiza (yellow card) 30'; Ali (yellow card) 41'; Hazra (yellow card) 44'; Mali 82'	Stadium: Kalyani Stadium; Attendance: 0 (Note: Match was played behind closed doors.); Man of the Match: Leander D'Cunha (FC Goa)

25 September 2021 4th Quarterfinal	Bengaluru	3–2	Army Green	Kolkata
14.00 IST	Muirang 20'; Augustine 46'; Augustine (yellow card) 47'; Bhutia 74'; Sharma (yellow card) 90'	Report	Lallawmkima 9' (pen.); Leon (yellow card) 63'; Vibin TV 89' (pen.); Singh (yellow card) 90+3'	Stadium: Vivekananda Yuba Bharati Krirangan; Attendance: 0 Man of the Match: Wungngayam Muirang (Bengaluru FC)

== Semi-finals ==
=== Summary ===
Team 1	Score	Team 2
Mohammedan	4–2 (a.e.t.)	Bengaluru United
Goa	2–2 (7–6 p)	Bengaluru

=== Matches ===
27 September 2021 1st Semifinal	Mohammedan	4–2 (a.e.t.)	Bengaluru United	Kolkata
18.00 IST	Joseph 8'; Faisal 37'; Shaheen (yellow card) 76'; Singh (yellow card) 90+1'; Vaz (yellow card) 96'; Stojanović (yellow card) 97'; Vanlalremdika 102'; Vanlalremdika (yellow card) 102'; Stojanović 109' (pen.); Firoj (yellow card) 113'	Report	Manzi 1'; Manzi (yellow card) 73' (yellow-red card) 90+2'; Debnath 78'; Majcen (yellow card) 81'; Ravanan (yellow card) 108'; Singh (yellow card) 117'; Pinto (yellow card) 118'	Stadium: Vivekananda Yuba Bharati Krirangan; Attendance: 24,291; Referee: Harish Kundu; Man of the Match: Marcus Joseph (Mohammedan SC)

29 September 2021 2nd Semifinal	Goa	2–2 (a.e.t.) (7–6 p)	Bengaluru	Kolkata
18.00 IST	Murgaonkar 8'; D'Cunha (yellow card) 32'; Tlang 71'; Davis (yellow card) 104'	Report	Narayanan 1', 83'; Kumar (yellow card) 74'; Sharma (yellow card) 75'; Singh (yellow card) 87'	Stadium: Vivekananda Yuba Bharati Krirangan; Attendance: 96; Referee: Rowan Arumughan; Man of the Match: Edu Bedia (FC Goa)
	Penalties
	Dohling (penalty scored); Tlang (penalty missed); Pereira (penalty scored); D'Cunha (penalty scored); Bedia (penalty scored); Chote (penalty scored); Papuia (penalty scored); Davis (penalty scored)		(penalty scored) Muirang; (penalty missed) Singh; (penalty scored) Chhetri; (penalty scored) Shrivas; (penalty scored) Bhutia; (penalty scored) Kumar; (penalty scored) Oram; (penalty missed) Lyngdoh

== Final ==
The final was played on 3 October 2021 at the Vivekananda Yuba Bharati Krirangan in Kolkata.

3 October 2021
18:00 IST

Mohammedan	0–1 (a.e.t.)	Goa
	Report	Bedia 105'

Vivekananda Yuba Bharati Krirangan, Kolkata, West Bengal
Attendance: 43,292
Referee: Rahul Kumar Gupta
