= 2021 Durand Cup =

130th edition of the Durand Cup

- Tournament poster

Tournament details
- Country: India
- Venue: West Bengal
- Dates: 5 September 2021 – 3 October 2021
- Teams: 16

Final positions
- Champions: FC Goa (1st title)
- Runners-up: Mohammedan

Tournament statistics
- Matches played: 29
- Goals scored: 105 (3.62 per match)
- Top goal scorer(s): Devendra Murgaonkar; Marcus Joseph (5 goals each)

Awards
- Best goalkeeper: Naveen Kumar (165 mins per goal)

The 2021 Durand Cup was the 130th edition of Durand Cup, the oldest football tournament in Asia. Like its previous edition, the tournament was hosted in West Bengal. The tournament is jointly hosted by the Eastern Command of the Indian Armed Forces and the Government of West Bengal.

The Durand Cup was cancelled in 2020 due to worldwide COVID-19 pandemic and was reorganised in 2021 after a year gap. Gokulam Kerala were the defending champions, having defeated Mohun Bagan in the 2019 final.

Mohammedan made their first Durand Cup final appearance since 2013 against FC Goa. The match went into the extra time with no goal from either side. Goan captain Edu Bedia's 105th minute solitary goal sealed Goa's victory against Mohammedan. Goa became the fourth Goan team to win the Durand Cup after Salgaocar, Dempo and Churchill Brothers.

== Teams ==
A total of 16 teams participated in the competition; 5 clubs from Indian Super League, 3 clubs from I-League, 2 clubs from I-League 2nd Division and 6 teams representing the Indian Armed Forces.

Location of the 2021 Durand Cup teams.
Indian Super League club
I-League club
I-League 2nd Division club
Indian Armed Forces team

Team	Head coach	Captain	Location
Indian Super League clubs
Bengaluru	(India) Naushad Moosa	(India) Ajith Kumar	Bengaluru, Karnataka
Goa	(Spain) Juan Ferrando	(Spain) Edu Bedia	Porvorim, Goa
Hyderabad	(India) Shameel Chembakath	(India) Pritam Kumar Singh	Hyderabad, Telangana
Jamshedpur	(India) Noel Wilson	(India) Jitendra Singh	Jamshedpur, Jharkhand
Kerala Blasters	(Serbia) Ivan Vukomanović	(India) Jessel Carneiro	Kochi, Kerala
I-League clubs
Gokulam Kerala	(Italy) Vincenzo Alberto Annese	(Afghanistan) Sharif Mukhammad	Calicut, Kerala
Mohammedan	(Russia) Andrey Chernyshov	(Serbia) Nikola Stojanović	Kolkata, West Bengal
Sudeva Delhi	(Bhutan) Chencho Dorji	(India) Sairuat Kima	New Delhi, Delhi
I-League 2nd Division clubs
Bengaluru United	(India) Richard Reginald Hood	(India) Dharmaraj Ravanan	Bengaluru, Karnataka
Delhi	(India) Yan Law	(India) Anwar Ali	Dwarka, Delhi
Indian Armed Force teams
Assam Rifles	(India) Ningombam Jiten Singh	(India) Jefferson Nongrud	—N/a
Army Green	(India) Mileswamy Govindaraju Ramachandran	(India) Roel Lepcha	—N/a
Army Red	(India) Anustup Sarkar	(India) Nongmaikapam Suresh Meitei	Kolkata, West Bengal
Indian Air Force	(India) Priya Darshan	(India) Vivek Kumar	New Delhi, Delhi
Indian Navy	(India) Abhilash Vasantha Nair	(India) Bhaskar Roy	—N/a
CRPF FT	(India) Dayal Singh Bhati	(India) Moses Antony	Jalandhar, Punjab

Mohun Bagan and East Bengal were invited to be part of the tournament but most of the first team players of Mohun Bagan were on international break and also had their AFC Cup knockouts coinciding with the Durand Cup fixtures, thus they backed out from the tournament, while East Bengal refused participation because of investor issues. Since this year India celebrates golden jubilee of its victory over Pakistan for the liberation of Bangladesh in 1971, DFTS invited Mohammedan SC and Sk. Jamal Dhanmondi Club from Bangladesh to participate in the 130th edition of the tournament. But due to the COVID-19 pandemic in Bangladesh, the clubs were unable to confirm their participation.

== Prize money ==
Position	Prize money
Champions	₹4 million (equivalent to ₹4.5 million or US$47,000 in 2023)
Runners-up	₹2 million (equivalent to ₹2.2 million or US$23,000 in 2023)
Semi-finalists	₹0.5 million (equivalent to ₹560,000 or US$5,800 in 2023)
Season awardees	₹0.1 million (equivalent to ₹110,000 or US$1,200 in 2023)
Total	~₹7.3 million (US$76,000)

== Official sponsors and partners ==
=== Co-sponsors ===
- Coal India
- State Bank of India
- ITC
- SERVO IndianOil

=== Associate sponsors ===
- GAIL
- Kalyani Group
- Pramerica Life Insurance
- JIS Group

=== Supported by ===
- GRSE
- Adani Defence & Aerospace
- Tata Advanced Systems
- TABLT Pharmacy
- Gloster
- Hindustan Aeronautics

=== Tournament partner ===
- IFA W.B.
- Cherry Tree

=== Streaming and radio partner ===
- Addatimes
- SonyLIV (only semifinals and final)
- 91.9 Friends FM

Source: Durand Cup

== Venues ==
Kalyani	Kolkata	
Kalyani Stadium	Vivekananda Yuba Bharati Krirangan	Mohun Bagan Ground
Capacity: 20,000	Capacity: 85,000	Capacity: 20,000
No. of matches: 9	No. of matches: 14	No. of matches: 6

== Group stage ==
=== Group A ===
Pos	Team	Pld	W	D	L	GF	GA	GD	Pts	Qualification
1	Bengaluru United	3	3	0	0	7	2	+5	9	Knockout stage
2	Mohammedan	3	2	0	1	9	4	+5	6	Knockout stage
3	Indian Air Force	3	0	1	2	3	8	−5	1	
4	CRPF FT	3	0	1	2	1	6	−5	1	

Rules for classification: 1) points; 2) head-to-head points; 3) head-to-head goal difference; 4) goal difference; 5) number of goals scored; 6) drawing of lots

==== Matches ====
5 September 2021 1	Indian Air Force	1–4	Mohammedan	Kolkata
16.15 IST	Jerone (yellow card) 40'; Sadhukan 47'; Singh (yellow card) 51'; Danish (yellow card) 53'	Report	Ongnam 19'; Singh 31'; Mallick 45'; Rahaman (yellow card) 47'; Joseph 77'; Vanlalremdika (yellow card) 85'	Stadium: Vivekananda Yuba Bharati Krirangan; Attendance: 0 (Note: Match was played behind closed doors.); Man of the Match: Nikola Stojanović (Mohammedan SC)

6 September 2021 2	CRPF FT	0–1	Bengaluru United	Kalyani
15.00 IST	Antony (red card) 71'	Report	Manzi 62'; Manzi (yellow card) 90+3'	Stadium: Kalyani Stadium; Attendance: 0 Man of the Match: Pedro Manzi (FC Bengaluru United)

9 September 2021 3	Indian Air Force	2–4	Bengaluru United	Kalyani
15.00 IST	Kumar 42', 51'; P Singh (yellow card) 46'; D Singh (yellow card) 62'; Das (yellow card) 84'	Report	Manzi 22' (pen.), 90+1'; Singh 28', 72'; Ravanan (yellow card) 47'	Stadium: Kalyani Stadium; Attendance: 0 Man of the Match: Yumnam Singh (FC Bengaluru United)

10 September 2021 4	CRPF FT	1–5	Mohammedan	Kalyani
15.00 IST	AA Singh (yellow card) 45'; A Singh 89'	Report	Mallick 13', 87'; Joseph 65', 66'; Vanlalremdika (yellow card) 90+2'	Stadium: Kalyani Stadium; Attendance: 0 Man of the Match: Azharuddin Mallick (Mohammedan SC)

14 September 2021 5	Mohammedan	0–2	Bengaluru United	Kalyani
15.00 IST	Vaz (red card) 90+4'	Report	Kumar (yellow card) 41'; Singh 64'; Majcen 90+5' (pen.); Majcen (yellow card) 90+5'	Stadium: Kalyani Stadium; Attendance: 0 Man of the Match: Kunzang Bhutia (FC Bengaluru United)

14 September 2021 6	CRPF FT	Cancelled	Indian Air Force	Kolkata
15.00 IST		Report		Stadium: Mohun Bagan Ground; Attendance: 0
Note: The match was abandoned due to heavy rainfall and waterlogging, resulting in pitch being unfit for play. Both teams were awarded a point each.

=== Group B ===
Pos	Team	Pld	W	D	L	GF	GA	GD	Pts	Qualification
1	Goa	3	3	0	0	9	1	+8	9	Knockout stage
2	Army Green	3	2	0	1	4	3	+1	6	Knockout stage
3	Jamshedpur	3	1	0	2	2	8	−6	3	
4	Sudeva Delhi	3	0	0	3	1	4	−3	0	

Rules for classification: 1) points; 2) head-to-head points; 3) head-to-head goal difference; 4) goal difference; 5) number of goals scored; 6) drawing of lots

==== Matches ====
6 September 2021 1	Jamshedpur	1–0	Sudeva Delhi	Kolkata
15.00 IST	Lalruatmawia 33'; J Singh (yellow card) 45+1'; P Singh (yellow card) 86'; Yadav (yellow card) 88'	Report	Singh (yellow card) 90+3'	Stadium: Mohun Bagan Ground; Attendance: 0 Man of the Match: Vishal Yadav (Jamshedpur FC)

7 September 2021 2	Goa	2–0	Army Green	Kolkata
15.00 IST	Noguera 35'; Murgaonkar 59'	Report		Stadium: Vivekananda Yuba Bharati Krirangan; Attendance: 0 Man of the Match: Sarath Narayanan M (Army Green)

10 September 2021 3	Jamshedpur	1–3	Army Green	Kolkata
15.00 IST	Singh (yellow card) 32'; Meitei (yellow card) 55'; J Singh 61' (pen.)	Report	Singh 43', 48'; Singh (yellow card) 89'; Chhetri 58'	Stadium: Mohun Bagan Ground; Attendance: 0 Man of the Match: Deepak Singh (Army Green)

13 September 2021 4	Goa	2–1	Sudeva Delhi	Kolkata
15.00 IST	Nemil 45+2'; Fernandes (yellow card) 46'; Ortiz 80'	Report	Kima (yellow card) 18'; Vanlalzuidika (yellow card) 33'; Khan (yellow card) 80'; Pauliankhum 90+8' (pen.)	Stadium: Vivekananda Yuba Bharati Krirangan; Attendance: 0 Man of the Match: Seriton Fernandes (FC Goa)

17 September 2021 5	Jamshedpur	0–5	Goa	Kolkata
15.00 IST	Singh (yellow card) 41'	Report	Murgaonkar 20', 44'; Rebello 26'; Nemil 46', 81'; D'Cunha (yellow card) 60'; Davis (yellow card) 65'	Stadium: Vivekananda Yuba Bharati Krirangan; Attendance: 0 Man of the Match: Muhammed Nemil (FC Goa)

17 September 2021 6	Army Green	1–0	Sudeva Delhi	Kolkata
15.00 IST	Lallawmkima (yellow card) 34'; Rana (yellow card) 42'; Singh 51'	Report	Kima (yellow card) 54'; Kharpan (yellow card) 88'	Stadium: Mohun Bagan Ground; Attendance: 0 Man of the Match: Deepak Singh (Army Green)

=== Group C ===
Pos	Team	Pld	W	D	L	GF	GA	GD	Pts	Qualification
1	Bengaluru	3	2	1	0	9	5	+4	7	Knockout stage
2	Delhi	3	1	1	1	4	4	0	4	Knockout stage
3	Kerala Blasters	3	1	0	2	1	3	−2	3	
4	Indian Navy	3	1	0	2	5	7	−2	3	

Source: Khel Now
Rules for classification: 1) points; 2) head-to-head points; 3) head-to-head goal difference; 4) goal difference; 5) number of goals scored; 6) drawing of lots

==== Matches ====
8 September 2021 1	Delhi	1–2	Indian Navy	Kolkata
15.00 IST	Plaza 21'; Ceesay (yellow card) 41'	Report	Sreyas VG 26'; Singh 86'	Stadium: Mohun Bagan Ground; Attendance: 0 Man of the Match: Dalraj Singh (Indian Navy)

11 September 2021 2	Kerala Blasters	1–0	Indian Navy	Kolkata
15.00 IST	Luna 71' (pen.); Khabra (yellow card) 84'	Report	S Singh (yellow card) 53'; D Singh (yellow card) 69'	Stadium: Vivekananda Yuba Bharati Krirangan; Attendance: 0 Man of the Match: Adrian Luna (Kerala Blasters)

15 September 2021 3	Bengaluru	2–0	Kerala Blasters	Kolkata
15.00 IST	Shrivas (yellow card) 38'; Bhutia 45'; Augustine 70'	Report	Soraisham (yellow card) 41' (red card) 83'; Hormipam (yellow card) 48' (yellow-red card) 64'; Meitei (yellow card) 84' (yellow-red card) 86'	Stadium: Vivekananda Yuba Bharati Krirangan; Attendance: 0 Man of the Match: Lara Sharma (Bengaluru FC)

18 September 2021 4	Delhi	2–2	Bengaluru	Kolkata
15.00 IST	Plaza 58', 62'	Report	Narayanan 27'; Chhetri (yellow card) 65'; Singh 75'	Stadium: Mohun Bagan Ground; Attendance: 0 Man of the Match: Willis Plaza (Delhi FC)

21 September 2021 5	Bengaluru	5–3	Indian Navy	Kolkata
15.00 IST	Augustine 53'; H Singh 61', 81'; Chhetri 73' (pen.); T Singh 90+2'	Report	Jijo F 19'; Sreyas VG 30'; Inayath (yellow card) 49'; Vijay J 90+4'	Stadium: Vivekananda Yuba Bharati Krirangan; Attendance: 0 Man of the Match: Harmanpreet Singh (Bengaluru FC)

21 September 2021 6	Delhi	1–0	Kerala Blasters	Kolkata
15.00 IST	Plaza 53'	Report	Sipovic (yellow card) 38'	Stadium: Kalyani Stadium; Attendance: 0 Man of the Match: Anwar Ali (Delhi FC)

=== Group D ===
Pos	Team	Pld	W	D	L	GF	GA	GD	Pts	Qualification
1	Gokulam Kerala	3	2	1	0	10	4	+6	7	Knockout stage
2	Army Red	3	2	1	0	8	4	+4	7	Knockout stage
3	Hyderabad	3	1	0	2	6	3	+3	3	
4	Assam Rifles	3	0	0	3	3	16	−13	0	

Rules for classification: 1) points; 2) head-to-head points; 3) head-to-head goal difference; 4) goal difference; 5) number of goals scored; 6) drawing of lots

==== Matches ====
9 September 2021 1	Army Red	4–1	Assam Rifles	Kolkata
15.00 IST	Shil 39'; Thapa 66'; Shah 75' (pen.); Meitei 82'		Rabha 41'; T Singh (yellow card) 74'; D Singh (red card) 80'; Narjinari (yellow card) 90+4'	Stadium: Vivekananda Yuba Bharati Krirangan; Attendance: 0 Man of the Match: Bikash Thapa (Army Red)

12 September 2021 2	Assam Rifles	0–5	Hyderabad	Kolkata
15.00 IST	Haokip (yellow card) 75'		Rabeeh 7'; Chhangte 18', 89'; Rohlupia 21'; Kumar 27'	Stadium: Mohun Bagan Ground; Attendance: 0 Man of the Match: Lalchungnunga Chhangte (Hyderabad FC)

12 September 2021 3	Gokulam Kerala	2–2	Army Red	Kalyani
15.00 IST	Osumanu 8'; Mukhammad 68' (pen.)	Report	Jain P 30'; Thapa 43'; Kumar (yellow card) 45'; Shafeel (yellow card) 73'	Stadium: Kalyani Stadium; Attendance: 0 Man of the Match: Christopher Kamei (Army Red)

16 September 2021 4	Gokulam Kerala	1–0	Hyderabad	Kalyani
15.00 IST	Osumanu 46'; Benny (yellow card) 10' (yellow-red card) 48'; Mukhammad (yellow card) 57'; Rishad P (yellow card) 90+2'	Report		Stadium: Kalyani Stadium; Attendance: 0 Man of the Match: Sharif Mukhammad (Gokulam Kerala FC)

19 September 2021 5	Army Red	2–1	Hyderabad	Kolkata
15.00 IST	Zothanpuia (yellow card) 18'; Meitei (yellow card) 32'; Shil 33', 70'; Kumar (yellow card) 59'	Report	Dutta 35'	Stadium: Vivekananda Yuba Bharati Krirangan; Attendance: 0 Man of the Match: Liton Shil (Army Red)

19 September 2021 6	Assam Rifles	2–7	Gokulam Kerala	Kalyani
15.00 IST	Singh 36'; Rishad P (yellow card) 38'; Haokip (yellow card) 54'; D Singh (yellow card) 58'; Rabha 63'	Report	Chikatara 1', 52', 72'; Baretto 2', 45+2'; Osumanu 34'; Sourav 60'; Saji (yellow card) 62'	Stadium: Kalyani Stadium; Attendance: 0 Man of the Match: Chisom Chikatara (Gokulam Kerala)

== Knockout stage ==
=== Bracket ===
Quarterfinals
Mohammedan	1
Gokulam Kerala	0
Army Red	-
Bengaluru United (w.o.)	-
Goa	5
Delhi	1
Bengaluru	3
Army Green	2

Semifinals
Mohammedan (a.e.t.)	4
Bengaluru United	2
Goa (p)	2(7)
Bengaluru	2(6)

Final
Mohammedan	0
Goa (a.e.t.)	1

=== Quarter-finals ===
Team 1	Score	Team 2
Mohammedan	1–0	Gokulam Kerala
Army Red	w/o (Note: Army Red withdrew from their Durand Cup quarter final fixture against FC Bengaluru United after reports of positive COVID-19 cases were discovered within the squad.)	Bengaluru United
Goa	5–1	Delhi
Bengaluru	3–2	Army Green

=== Semi-finals ===
Team 1	Score	Team 2
Mohammedan	4–2 (a.e.t)	Bengaluru United
Goa	2–2 (7–6 pen.)	Bengaluru

=== Final ===
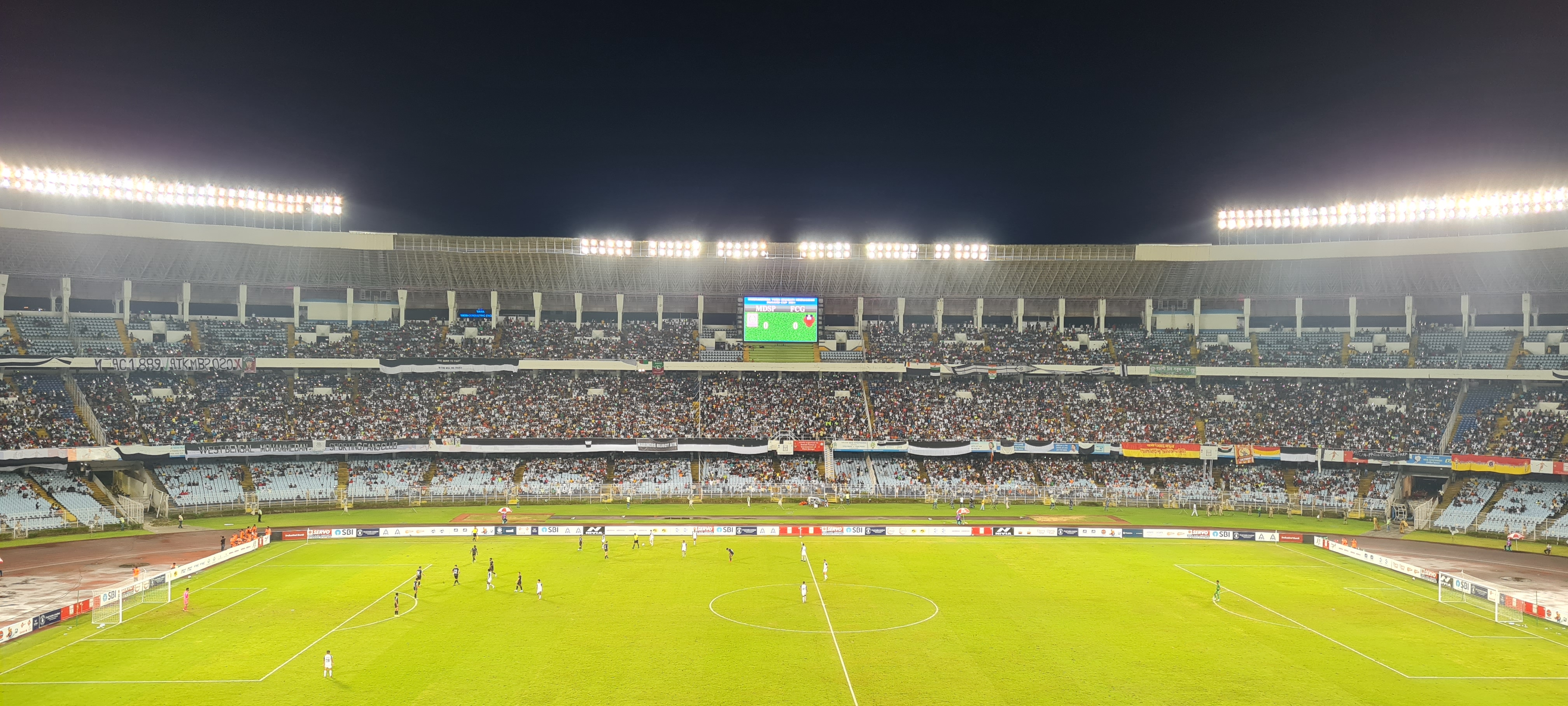
2021 Durand Cup Final

3 October 2021
18:00 IST

Mohammedan	0–1 (a.e.t.)	Goa
	Report	Bedia 105'

Vivekananda Yuba Bharati Krirangan, Kolkata, West Bengal
Attendance: 43,292
Referee: Rahul Kumar Gupta

== Statistics ==
=== Top scorers ===
As of 3 October 2021

Note: Only top goal scorers with 3 or more goals are mentioned.

Rank	Player	Club	Goals
1	(India) Devendra Murgaonkar	Goa	5
1	(Trinidad and Tobago) Marcus Joseph	Mohammedan	5
3	(India) Muhammed Nemil	Goa	4
3	(Spain) Pedro Manzi	Bengaluru United	4
3	(Trinidad and Tobago) Willis Plaza	Delhi	4
6	(India) Azharuddin Mallick	Mohammedan	3
6	(Nigeria) Chisom Chikatara	Gokulam Kerala	3
6	(India) Deepak Singh	Army Green	3
6	(India) Leon Augustine	Bengaluru	3
6	(India) Liton Shil	Army Red	3
6	(Ghana) Rahim Osumanu	Gokulam Kerala	3
6	(India) Sivasakthi Narayanan	Bengaluru	3

=== Hatricks ===
Note: Player's team score mentioned first

Player	Club	Against	Result	Date
(Nigeria) Chisom Chikatara	Gokulam Kerala	Assam Rifles	7–2	19 September 2021

=== Most clean sheets ===
As of 3 October 2021

Rank	Player	Club	Clean sheets
1	(India) Kunzang Bhutia	Bengaluru United	2
1	(India) Naveen Kumar	Goa	2
2	(India) Ajmal PA	Gokulam Kerala	1
2	(India) Albino Gomes	Kerala Blasters	1
2	(India) Hrithik Tiwari	Goa	1
2	(India) Lalbiakhlua Jongte	Hyderabad	1
2	(India) Lara Sharma	Bengaluru	1
2	(India) Lovepreet Singh	Delhi	1
2	(India) Roluahpuia	Army Green	1
2	(India) Vishal Yadav	Jamshedpur	1
2	(India) Zothanmawia	Mohammedan	1

== Season awards ==
=== Golden glove for best goalkeeper ===
- (India) Naveen Kumar (Goa)

=== Golden boot for top scorer ===
- (Trinidad and Tobago) Marcus Joseph (Mohammedan)

=== Golden ball for best player ===
- (Spain) Edu Bedia (Goa)

== See also ==
- Indian Super League
- I-League
- I-League 2nd Division
- Super Cup
- IFA Shield

== Notes ==
1. Attendance: Due to the presumed emergence of third wave of COVID-19 outbreak, only 50% of attendance at most would be allowed in the stadiums by Government of West Bengal. But, the Durand Football Tournament Society decided to first allow negligible or no attendance, and then gradually towards the end of the tournament, allow up to 50% of attendance in compliance with government norms if everything went well.
