= 2021 Durand Cup final =

Final of the 130th edition of the Durand Cup

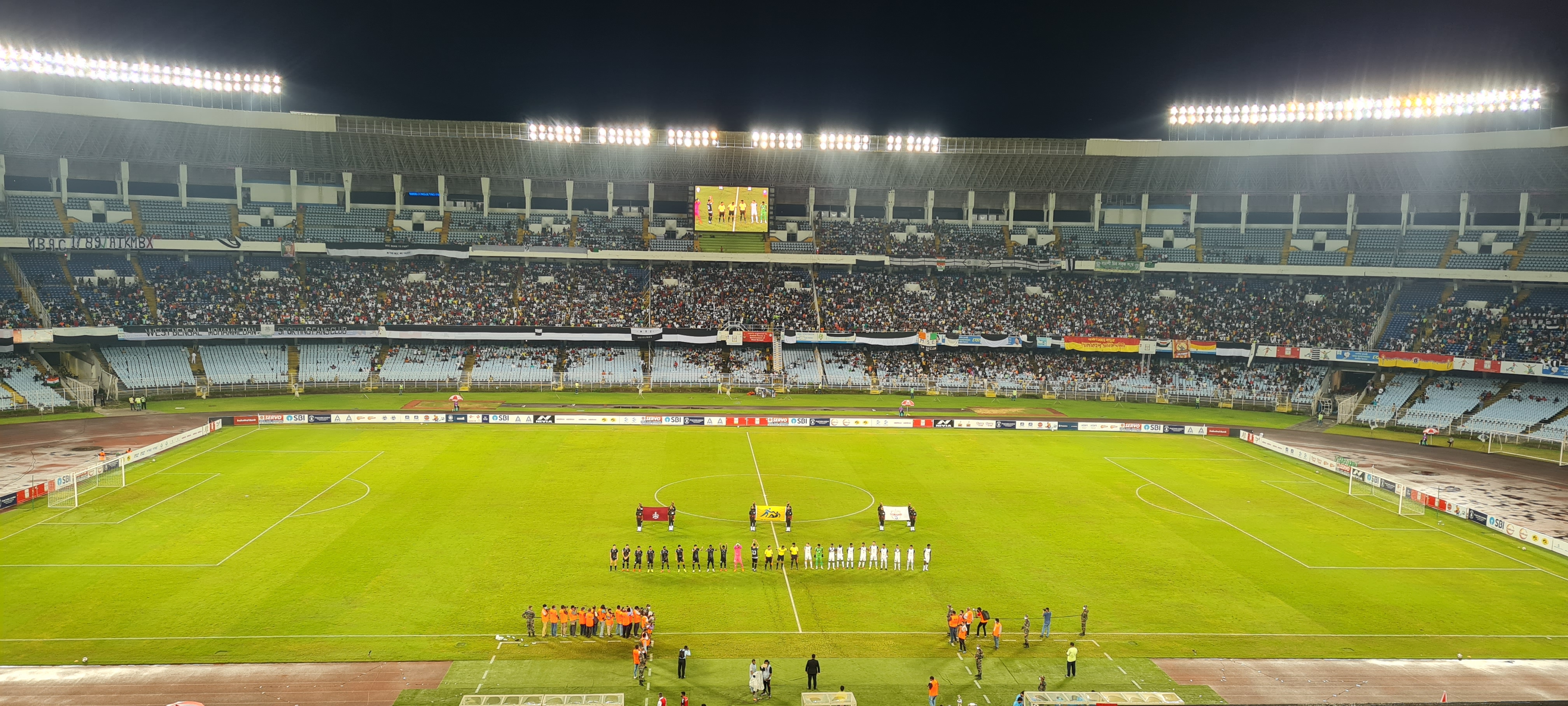
- Mohammedan (in white) and Goa (in black) line-up before kick-off at the Vivekananda Yuba Bharati Krirangan
- Event: 2021 Durand Cup
Mohammedan	Goa
0	1
- Date: 3 October 2021
- Venue: Vivekananda Yuba Bharati Krirangan, Kolkata
- Man of the Match: (Spain) Edu Bedia (Goa)
- Referee: Rahul Kumar Gupta (India)
- Attendance: 43,292
- Weather: Cloudy evening 31 °C (88 °F); 85% humidity

The 2021 Durand Cup final was the final match of the 2021 Durand Cup, the 130th edition of Asia's oldest football. The tournament is organised by the Durand Football Tournament Society (DFTS) of Indian Armed Forces and jointly hosted by the Eastern Command and the Government of West Bengal. It was played at the Vivekananda Yuba Bharati Krirangan in Kolkata, India on 3 October 2021.

== Background ==
Mohammedan SC were playing their sixth Durand Cup final. They became the first civilian team to win the tournament in 1940, and since then they could win only once after 73 years, in 2013, although they reached the finals three more times in between. Aside Mohun Bagan and East Bengal, Mohammedan is the most successful team from West Bengal. Mohammedan overcame the group stage as the group runner-up under the newly appointed coach, Andrey Chernyshov. In the knockout stage they faced the defending champions of Durand Cup, Gokulam Kerala, and subsequently they faced Bengaluru United, who had already gave them their only group stage defeat. After 120 minutes of play, Mohammedan got their revenge on Bengaluru United and reached the final.

FC Goa became the first Indian Super League team to reach the Durand Cup final. They had previously participated in this tournament only once in 2019. Goa is the fourth Goan side to reach the Durand Cup finals. Under the coaching of Juan Ferrando, Goa dominated in the group stage and faced Delhi and later Bengaluru in the knockout stage. The semi-final against Bengaluru went to penalty shoot-out to decide the finalist.

This was the first meeting between Mohammedan and Goa.

== Route to the final ==
Note: In all results below, the score of the finalist is given first.

Mohammedan		Round	Goa	
Opponent	Result	Group stage	Opponent	Result
Indian Air Force	4–1	Matchday 1	Army Green	2–0
CRPF	5–1	Matchday 2	Sudeva Delhi	2–1
Bengaluru United	0–2	Matchday 3	Jamshedpur	5–0
Group A runner-up: Pos / Team / Pld / Pts; 1 / Bengaluru United / 3 / 9; 2 / Mohammedan / 3 / 6; 3 / Indian Air Force / 3 / 1; 4 / CRPF FT / 3 / 1; Source:		Final standings	Group B winner: Pos / Team / Pld / Pts; 1 / Goa / 3 / 9; 2 / Army Green / 3 / 6; 3 / Jamshedpur / 3 / 3; 4 / Sudeva Delhi / 3 / 0; Source:	
Opponent	Result	Knockout stage	Opponent	Result
Gokulam Kerala	1–0	Quarter-finals	Delhi	5–1
Bengaluru United	4–2 (a.e.t.)	Semi-finals	Bengaluru	2–2 (a.e.t.); 7–6(p)

== Pre-match ==
=== Ticketing and attendance ===
Due to the COVID-19 pandemic in West Bengal, the Government of West Bengal allowed only 50% of the total capacity for spectators. The tickets for the 2021 Durand Cup final were made available free of cost at Mohammedan SC, Mohun Bagan AC and SC East Bengal respective tents at Maidan and at Vivekananda Yuba Bharati Krirangan from 29 September to 2 October. The tickets were also available on the matchday at all the aforementioned venues, except VYBK.

On the matchday the stadium was filled up with around 43,000 supporters of Mohammedan SC, as they played at their home ground. A small number of FC Goa supporters also arrived all the way from Goa to back the team. In total almost 43,292 spectators arrived at VYBK for the final match.

=== Guests ===
The match was attended by a number of eminent personalities including the Governor of West Bengal Jagdeep Dhankhar, the First Lady of West Bengal Sudesh Dhankhar, the Cabinet Minister for Sports and Youth Affairs (Government of West Bengal) Aroop Biswas, the Minister of State for Sports and Youth Affairs (Government of West Bengal) Manoj Tiwary, the Chief of Defence Staff General Bipin Rawat, the Commander of Eastern Command Lt. Gen. Manoj Pande and the Chief of Staff, Eastern Command Lt. Gen. Kamal Kumar Repswal.

== Match ==
=== Summary ===
The final match of the 130th Durand Cup edition kicked off on a lively note in front of 44,000+ spectators with both Mohammedan SC and FC Goa both going on the attack from the beginning. The first shot of the match came from Marcus Joseph in third minute but it was wayward. Soon after, Goa created a chance but a mix-up between Muhammed Nemil and Alexander Romario Jesuraj in the box led to an easy save for the Mohammedan keeper, Zothanmawia.

As the half started to progress, the temperature started to increase and the foul count also started to increase. Mohammedan was at the receiving end of the cards as they received three yellow cards within a span of 17 minutes. Azharuddin Mallick, Nikola Stojanović and Shaher Shaheen were booked.

The match was slowly starting to open up now, as chances were being created more often but none of them were being converted. A sudden moment of uproar came at the VYBK in the 35th minute when a shot from Milan Singh went flying into the goal from a distance but a foul was called by the referee just before the shot was taken and disappointment of the crowd was clearly visible. For Goa, Jesuraj had the best chance of the half when the defence was completely foxed by a cross from Sanson Pereira from the left flank but Jesuraj sent the shot wide of the goal post. The first half ended with the scores tied with no goal scored.

The second half saw Goa dominating possession but the same wasn’t resulting into concrete chances as they were losing the ball far too easily in the final third. In the meantime, Mohammedan finally made their first change of the match when Brandon Vanlalremdika came on for Mallick, who was already on a yellow card. Goa also made their first change in the 85th minute with Redeem Tlang coming on for Jesuraj.

The last few minutes saw some moments of excitement. Mohammedan made some good runs by Faisal Ali down the left flank in the last 5 minutes but again failed to make them count. In the injury time, Redeem Tlang came close to scoring the first goal but the angle was too steep and the ball went across the face of the goal. With scores tied with no goal scored yet at the end of the regulation time, the final went into extra time.

While the first half of the extra time was seeming that it will end goalless yet again, it was the captain of Goa, Edu Bedia who came up with the goods. Bedia scored from a free kick awarded just outside the Mohammedan box in the 105th minute owing to a foul by Milan Singh.

Though Mohammedan was desperate for a goal in the second half of the extra time but they seemed out of sorts much like their performance in the regulation time. It seemed that Goa will have no issue sealing the deal but a moment of scare came for Goa with just 2 minutes to go in extra time as Stojanović's shot from distance demanded a flying save from Naveen Kumar.

The match finally ended with FC Goa being crowned the champions of the 130th Durand Cup for the first time, defeating Mohammedan SC 1-0.

=== Details ===
3 October 2021
18:00 IST

Mohammedan	0–1 (a.e.t.)	Goa
	Report	Bedia 105'

Vivekananda Yuba Bharati Krirangan, Kolkata, West Bengal
Attendance: 43,292
Referee: Rahul Kumar Gupta

Mohammedan	Goa

GK	42	(India) Zothanmawia
RB	11	(India) Faisal Ali	(yellow card) 119'
CB	4	(India) Wayne Vaz
CB	16	(Syria) Shaher Shaheen	(yellow card) 29'
LB	41	(India) Manoj Mohammed
DM	12	(India) Milan Singh	(yellow card) 104'	(substituted off) 118'
RM	47	(India) Shekh Faiaz		(substituted off) 87'
CM	20	(Serbia) Nikola Stojanović (c)	(yellow card) 25'
LM	27	(India) Lalramchullova
SS	10	(Trinidad and Tobago) Marcus Joseph
CF	35	(India) Azharuddin Mallick	(yellow card) 13'	(substituted off) 63'
Substitutes:
GK	1	(India) Mithun Samanta
DF	5	(India) Arijeet Singh
DF	6	(India) Safiul Rahaman
DF	24	(India) Sujit Sadhu
DF	39	(India) Lalramhmunmawia
MF	26	(India) Firoj Ali
MF	32	(India) Phrangki Buam		(substituted on) 87'
MF	33	(India) Sushil Meitei
FW	19	(India) Jaskaranpreet Singh		(substituted on) 118'
FW	28	(India) Brandon Vanlalremdika		(substituted on) 63'
Head coach:
(Russia) Andrey Chernyshov

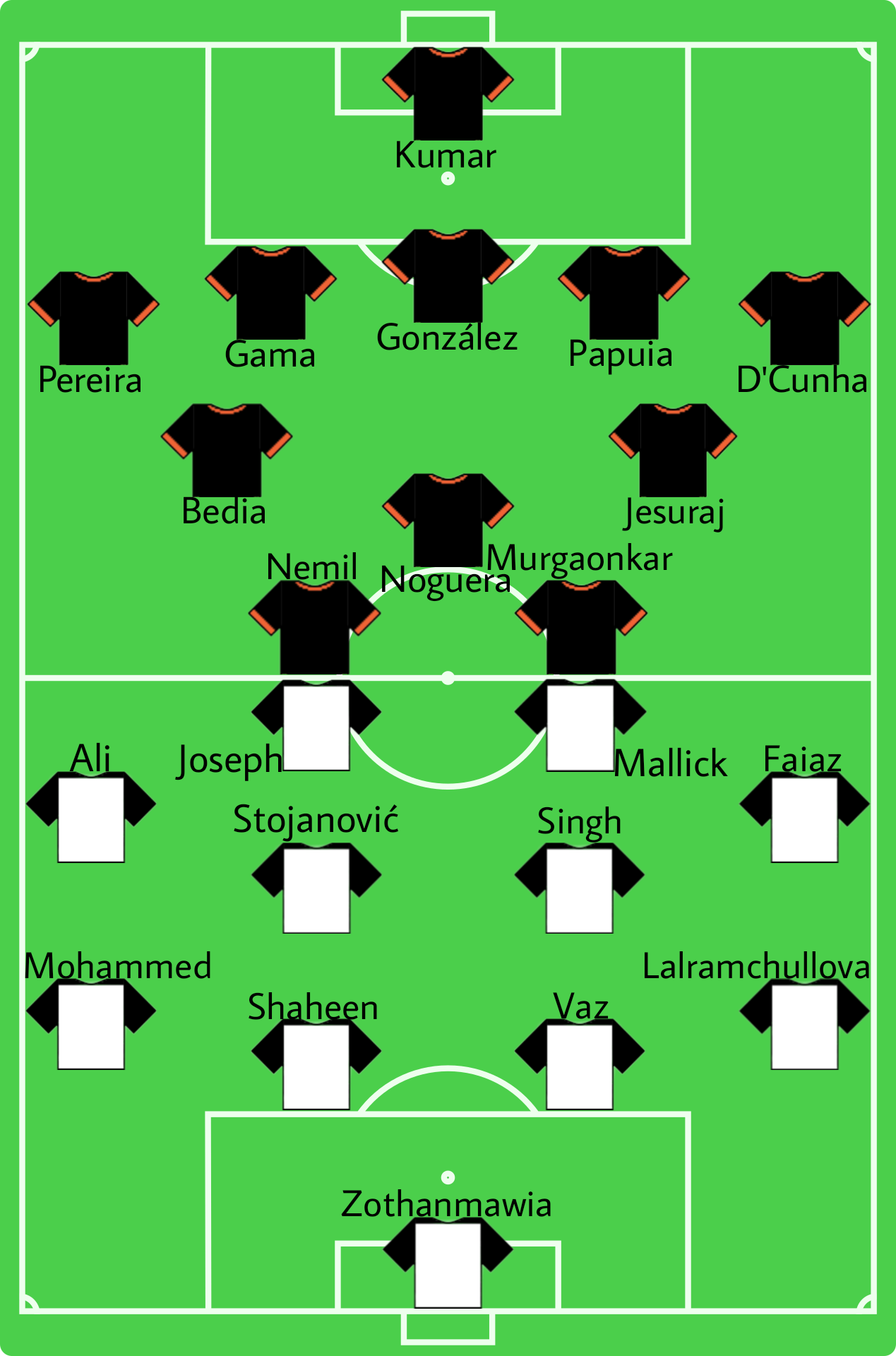

GK	32	(India) Naveen Kumar
RB	6	(India) Leander D'Cunha
CB	24	(Spain) Iván González
CB	41	(India) Lalhmangaihsanga Ralte
LB	11	(India) Saviour Gama		(substituted off) 93'
CM	23	(Spain) Edu Bedia (c)	(yellow card) 53'
CM	44	(India) Muhammed Nemil		(substituted off) 116'
RW	14	(India) Romario Jesuraj		(substituted off) 85'
AM	5	(Spain) Alberto Noguera		(substituted off) 108'
LW	21	(India) Sanson Pereira
CF	29	(India) Devendra Murgaonkar		(substituted off) 93'
Substitutes:
GK	55	(India) Hrithik Tiwari
DF	27	(India) Aibanbha Dohling		(substituted on) 116'
MF	48	(India) Delton Colaco
MF	46	(India) Chirsty Davis		(substituted on) 93'
MF	42	(India) Brison Fernandes
MF	18	(India) Danstan Fernandes
MF	11	(India) Princeton Rebello		(substituted on) 108'
FW	47	(India) Omkar Landge
FW	22	(India) Redeem Tlang		(substituted on) 85'
FW	19	(India) Makan Chote		(substituted on) 93'
Head coach:
(Spain) Juan Ferrando

Man of the Match:
Edu Bedia (Goa)

Assistant referees:
Arun Sasidharan Pillai (India)
Harish Kundu (India)
Fourth official:
Rowan Arumughan (India)

Match rules

- 90 minutes.
- 30 minutes of extra time if necessary.
- Penalty shoot-out if scores still level.
- Maximum of ten named substitutes.
- Maximum of five substitutions allowed.

== Broadcasting ==
The final match of the 2021 Durand Cup was broadcast on Sony Ten 2 and Sony Ten 2 HD. The match was also available on OTT media services of Addatimes and SonyLIV. Additionally a live audio commentary was done on 91.9 Friends FM and Prasar Bharati Sports YouTube channel.
