= 2021–22 Bengaluru FC season =

9th season in existence of Bengaluru FC

Bengaluru FC
2021–22 season
- Chairman: (India) Parth Jindal
- Manager: (Germany) Marco Pezzaiuoli
- Stadium: GMC Athletic Stadium (Note: 2021–22 Indian Super League season will be played exclusively at Goa due to COVID-19 pandemic in India)
- Indian Super League: 6th
- AFC Cup: Group Stage
- Durand Cup: Semi Final
Home colours	Away colours	Third colours
- All statistics correct as of 23 April 2022.

The 2021–22 season was India's Bengaluru FC's ninth season as a club since its establishment in 2013. The Blues participated in AFC Cup, Durand Cup and finished sixth in their fifth Indian Super League season. All domestic league games of Bengaluru were held behind closed doors at GMC Athletic Stadium due to COVID-19 pandemic.

== Background ==
=== Transfers ===
During the month of June, Bengaluru FC announced the contract extensions of Sunil Chhetri and Suresh Singh Wangjam. Chhetri extended his stay at the club for another two years and Suresh for three years. On 2 July Bengaluru FC announced that Gabonese defender Yrondu Musavu-King signed a two-year extension with the club.

On 29 June Bengaluru FC announced signing of midfielder Rohit Kumar on a two-year deal. On 6 July Bengaluru FC announced signing of defender Alan Costa from Brazilian club Avaí FC on a two-year loan. On 12 July Bengaluru FC announced signing of defender Sarthak Golui on a two-year deal.

At the end of the 2020–21 season defender Rahul Bheke and midfielders Dimas Delgado and Harmanjot Khabra parted ways with the club. On 28 June Bengaluru FC announced release of Spanish defender Juanan on mutual consent.

=== In ===
No.	Position	Player	Previous club	Date	Fee	Ref
18	MF	(India) Rohit Kumar	Kerala Blasters	29 June 2021	Free agent	
16	DF	(India) Sarthak Golui	East Bengal	12 July 2021	Free agent	
9	FW	(Republic of the Congo) Prince Ibara	(France) Châteauroux	16 July 2021	Free agent	
14	FW	(India) Harmanpreet Singh	East Bengal	19 July 2021	Free agent	
7	MF	(India) Jayesh Rane	ATK Mohun Bagan	22 July 2021	Free agent	
12	MF	(India) Danish Farooq Bhat	Real Kashmir	25 July 2021	Free agent	
26	FW	(India) Bidyashagar Singh	TRAU	28 July 2021		
6	MF	(Brazil) Bruno Ramires	(Portugal) Belenenses	28 August 2021	Free agent	
10	MF	(Iran) Iman Basafa	(Iran) Machine Sazi	14 September 2021	Free agent	

=== Loan In ===
No.	Position	Player	Previous club	Date	Fee	Ref
5	DF	(Brazil) Alan Costa	(Brazil) Avaí	6 July 2021	Undisclosed	

=== Out ===
No.	Position	Player	Outgoing club	Date	Fee	Ref
10	MF	(India) Harmanjot Khabra	Kerala Blasters	30 May 2021	Free agent	
14	MF	(Spain) Dimas Delgado	–	30 May 2021	Free agent	
2	DF	(India) Rahul Bheke	Mumbai City	31 May 2021	Free agent	
18	FW	(India) Thongkhosiem Haokip	East Bengal	31 May 2021	Free agent	
55	DF	(India) Fran González		31 May 2021	Free agent	
	MF	(Spain) Xisco Hernández		31 May 2021	Free agent	
4	DF	(Spain) Juanan	Hyderabad	28 June 2021	Released	
24	DF	(India) Joe Zoherliana	NorthEast United	26 July 2021	Released	
28	GK	(India) Lalthuammawia Ralte	RoundGlass Punjab	28 August 2021	Undisclosed	
33	MF	(India) Emanuel Lalchhanchhuaha	NorthEast United	8 September 2021	Undisclosed	

== Preseason ==
21 October 2021 Friendly	Bengaluru	2–3	Chennaiyin	Goa
16:00 IST	Augustine; Silva	Report	Borysium; Koman; Vanspaul

30 October 2021 Friendly	Bengaluru	1–1	Jamshedpur	Goa
9:30 IST	Rane 15'	Report	Murray 27'

6 November 2021 Friendly	Goa	2–1	Bengaluru	Goa
? IST			Chhetri

15 November 2021 Friendly	Bengaluru	1–0	Jamshedpur	Goa
? IST	Ramires 25'

16 November 2021 Friendly	Chennaiyin	2–3	Bengaluru	Goa
? IST	Ali (?)	Report	Sivasakthi; Basafa; Roshan

== Competitions ==
=== Overview ===
Competition	First match	Last match	Starting round	Record							
Competition	First match	Last match	Starting round	Pld	W	D	L	GF	GA	GD	Win %
Super League	20 November 2021	5 March 2022	Matchday 1	20	8	5	7	32	27	+5	40.00
AFC Cup	15 August 2021	24 August 2021	Playoff Round	4	2	1	1	7	4	+3	50.00
Durand Cup	15 September 2021	29 September 2021	Group Stage	5	3	2	0	14	9	+5	60.00
Total				29	13	8	8	53	40	+13	44.83

Last updated: 5 March 2022.
Source: Competitions

=== Indian Super League ===
==== League table ====
Pos	Team	Pld	W	D	L	GF	GA	GD	Pts	Qualification
4	Kerala Blasters	20	9	7	4	34	24	+10	34	Qualification to ISL playoffs
5	Mumbai City	20	9	4	7	36	31	+5	31	
6	Bengaluru	20	8	5	7	32	27	+5	29	
7	Odisha	20	6	5	9	31	43	−12	23	
8	Chennaiyin	20	5	5	10	17	35	−18	20	

Source: Indian Super League
Rules for classification: 1) points; 2) head-to-head points; 3) head-to-head goal difference; 4) head-to-head goals scored; 5) goal difference; 6) number of goals scored; 7) fair play ranking; 8) drawing of lots

==== Result summary ====
Overall								Home						Away					
Pld	W	D	L	GF	GA	GD	Pts	W	D	L	GF	GA	GD	W	D	L	GF	GA	GD
20	8	5	7	32	27	+5	9	4	4	2	20	15	+5	4	1	5	12	12	0

==== Results by round ====
Matchday	1	2	3	4	5	6	7	8	9	10	11	12	13	14	15	16	17	18	19	20
Ground	H	A	H	H	A	A	H	A	A	H	A	H	H	A	H	H	A	H	A	A
Result	W	L	D	L	L	L	D	D	W	D	W	D	W	W	W	L	L	W	L	W
Position	2	5	4	7	9	10	9	10	8	8	7	7	8	6	3	3	3	6	5	6

Source: soccerway
A = Away; H = Home; W = Win; D = Draw; L = Loss

==== Matches ====
Win Draw Loss Void / Postponed

20 November 2021 1	Bengaluru	4–2	NorthEast United	Bambolim
19:30 IST	Silva 14', 42' (yellow card) 45'; Shareef 23' (o.g.); Rane 42'; Ibara 81'	Report	Brown 17'; Coureur 25'	Stadium: GMC Athletic Stadium; Referee: Rahul Kumar Gupta; Man of the Match: Udanta Singh

24 November 2021 2	Odisha	3–1	Bengaluru	Vasco
19:30 IST	Hernandez 3', 51'; Antonay 61'; Cabrera 90'	Report	Kuruniyan (yellow card) 13'; Costa 21'; Ramires (yellow card) 58'	Stadium: Tilak Maidan Stadium; Referee: R Venkatesh; Man of the Match: Javier Hernandez

28 November 2021 3	Bengaluru	1–1	Kerala Blasters	Bambolim
19:30 IST	Chowdhary (yellow card) 22'; Kuruniyan 84'	Report	Kuruniyan 88' (o.g.); Khabra (yellow card) 89'	Stadium: GMC Athletic Stadium; Referee: Pranjal Banerjee; Man of the Match: Harmanjot Khabra

4 December 2021 4	Bengaluru	1–3	Mumbai City	Bambolim
21:30 IST	Wangjam (yellow card) 14'; Silva 20'; R. Singh (yellow card) 36'; Chhetri (yellow card) 76'	Report	Angulo 9'; Jahouh (yellow card) 46'; Fall 54'; Ranawade (yellow card) 70'; Catatau 85'	Stadium: GMC Athletic Stadium; Referee: Pranjal Banerjee; Man of the Match: Lalengmawia

8 December 2021 5	Hyderabad	1–0	Bengaluru	Bambolim
19:30 IST	Ogbeche 7'; Jadhav (yellow card) 83'	Report	R. Singh (yellow card) 29'; Wangjam (yellow card) 38'	Stadium: GMC Athletic Stadium; Referee: Harish Kundu; Man of the Match: Souvik Chakrabarti

11 December 2021 6	Goa	2–1	Bengaluru	Bambolim
21:30 IST	Martins (yellow card) 13'; Kuruniyan 18' (o.g.); Ortiz (red card) 55'; Murgaonkar 70'	Report	R. Singh (yellow card) 32' Silva 45'; Farooq (yellow card) 52'; Wangjam (yellow card) 55' (yellow-red card) 84'; Ibara (yellow card) 57'; Ramires (yellow card) 68'; Shrivas (yellow card) 78'	Stadium: GMC Athletic Stadium; Referee: Pranjal Banerjee; Man of the Match: Devendra Murgaonkar

16 December 2021 7	Bengaluru	3–3	ATK Mohun Bagan	Bambolim
19:30 IST	Silva (pen.), 18'; Farooq 26'; A. Kumar (yellow card) 39'; R. Singh (yellow card) 69'; Ibara 72'; U. Singh (yellow card) 81'	Report	Bose 13'; Boumous 38' (yellow card) 43'; Krishna 58'	Stadium: GMC Athletic Stadium; Referee: Crystal John; Man of the Match: Subhasish Bose

20 December 2021 8	Jamshedpur	0–0	Bengaluru	Bambolim
19:30 IST	Jitendra (yellow card) 57'	Report		Stadium: GMC Athletic Stadium; Referee: Senthil Nathan; Man of the Match: Greg Stewart

30 December 2021 9	Chennaiyin	2–4	Bengaluru	Vasco
19:30 IST	Murzaev 4'; Ali 49'	Report	Ibara (yellow card) 13'; Silva 39'; Costa 43'; Kuruniyan (yellow card) 45'; Wangjam (yellow card) 57'; U. Singh 70'; Chowdhary 74'; Farooq (yellow card) 80'	Stadium: Tilak Maidan Stadium; Referee: Rahul Kumar Gupta; Man of the Match: Naorem Roshan Singh

4 January 2022 10	Bengaluru	1–1	East Bengal	Bambolim
19:30 IST	R. Singh (yellow card) 27'; Das 58' (o.g.)	Report	Bhattacharya (yellow card) 3'; Haokip 28'; Mukherjee (yellow card) 87'	Stadium: GMC Athletic Stadium; Referee: Harish Kundu; Man of the Match: Adil Khan

10 January 2022 11	Mumbai	0–3	Bengaluru	Margao
19:30 IST	Bheke (yellow card) 26'; Rai (yellow card) 45'; G. Singh (yellow card) 85'	Report	Farooq 8' (yellow card) 45'; Ibara 23', 45'; Chowdhary (yellow card) 33'	Stadium: Fatorda Stadium; Referee: Coimbatore Ramaswamy Srikrishna; Man of the Match: Naorem Roshan Singh

15 January 2022 12	ATK Mohun Bagan	–	Bengaluru	Margao
19:30 IST		postponed		Stadium: Fatorda Stadium

23 January 2022 12	Goa	1–1	Bengaluru	Bambolim
19:30 IST	Fox 41'	Report	Basafa (yellow card) 24'; Farooq (yellow card) 32'; Chhetri 61'; R. Singh (yellow card) 74'; Ibara (yellow card) 75'; R. Kumar (yellow card) 87'; U. Singh (yellow card) 90'	Stadium: GMC Athletic Stadium; Referee: Pranjal Banerjee; Man of the Match: Dylan Fox

26 January 2022 13	Bengaluru	3–0	Chennaiyin	Bambolim
19:30 IST	Basafa 20'; U. Singh 42', 52'	Report	Dhot (yellow card) 41'; Ali (yellow card) 88'	Stadium: GMC Athletic Stadium; Referee: Pratik Mondal; Man of the Match: Udanta Singh

30 January 2022 14	Kerala Blasters	0–1	Bengaluru	Vasco
19:30 IST	Khawlhring (yellow card) 41'; Vazquez (yellow card) 62'	Report	Ibara (yellow card) 11'; Naorem Roshan Singh 56'	Stadium: Tilak Maidan Stadium; Referee: Harish Kundu; Man of the Match: Naorem Roshan Singh

5 February 2022 15	Bengaluru	3–1	Jamshedpur	Bambolim
19:30 IST	Chhetri 55'; Silva 62', 90'	Report	Chukwu 1'	Stadium: GMC Athletic Stadium; Referee: Coimbatore Ramaswamy Srikrishna; Man of the Match: Bruno Ramires

11 February 2022 16	Bengaluru	1–2	Hyderabad	Bambolim
19:30 IST	Farooq (yellow card) 27'; Shrivas (yellow card) 42'; R. Singh (yellow card) 82'; Chhetri (yellow card) 87'	Report	Siverio 16'; Victor 30'; Juanan (yellow card) 64'	Stadium: GMC Athletic Stadium; Referee: Tejas Nagvenkar; Man of the Match: Joao Victor

18 February 2022 17	Northeast United	2–1	Bengaluru	Margao
19:30 IST	Lakra (yellow card) 23'; Irshad (yellow card) 23'; Santana (yellow card) 62'; Brown 74'; T. Singh (yellow card) 90'	Report	Farooq (yellow card) 54'; Silva 66' (yellow card) 90'	Stadium: Fatorda Stadium; Referee: R Venkatesh; Man of the Match: Joe Zoherliana

21 February 2022 18	Bengaluru	2–1	Odisha	Bambolim
19:30 IST	Ibara (yellow card) 12'; Farooq 31' (yellow card) 74'; Silva 49'	Report	Sekar 8'; Lalruatthara (yellow card) 41'; Vanmalsawma (yellow card) 70'	Stadium: GMC Athletic Stadium; Referee: Senthil Nathan; Man of the Match: Danish Farooq Bhat

27 February 2022 19	ATK Mohun Bagan	2–0	Bengaluru	Margao
19:30 IST	Colaco 45'; M. Singh (yellow card) 85'	Report	Chhetri (yellow card) 50'; Banana (yellow card) 71'; Augustine (yellow card) 74'	Stadium: Fatorda Stadium; Referee: Harish Kundu; Man of the Match: Sandesh Jhingan

5 March 2022 20	East Bengal	0–1	Bengaluru	Vasco
19:30 IST	N. Singh (yellow card) 90'	Report	Chhetri 24'	Stadium: Tilak Maidan Stadium; Referee: Senthil Nathan; Man of the Match: Lara Sharma

=== AFC Cup ===
==== Qualifying play-offs ====
Play-off round

Due to the COVID-19 pandemic Play-off round between Bengaluru FC and Eagles FC scheduled for May 2021 postponed to 15 August 2021.

15 August 2021	Bengaluru (India)	1–0	(Maldives) Eagles	Malé, Maldives
20:00 UTC+5	26' Rane; (yellow card) 47' U. Singh; (yellow card) 68' Silva	Report	(yellow card) 37' Ali; (yellow card) 57' Naim	Stadium: National Football Stadium; Attendance: 0 Referee: (Jordan) Ahmad Yacoub Ibrahim; MVP: Jayesh Rane (Bengaluru)

==== Group stage ====
Pos	Team	Pld	W	D	L	GF	GA	GD	Pts	Qualification	MBSG	BSK	BFC	MAZ
1	(India) ATK Mohun Bagan	3	2	1	0	6	2	+4	7	Inter-zone play-off semi-finals	—	1–1	2–0	—
2	(Bangladesh) Bashundhara Kings	3	1	2	0	3	1	+2	5		—	—	—	2–0
3	(India) Bengaluru	3	1	1	1	6	4	+2	4		—	0−0	—	—
4	(Maldives) Maziya (H)	3	0	0	3	3	11	−8	0		1–3	—	2–6	—

Source: AFC
Rules for classification: Tiebreakers
(H) Hosts

18 August 2021	ATK Mohun Bagan (India)	2–0	(India) Bengaluru	Malé, Maldives
16:00 UTC+5	Krishna 39'; Bose 46'; Boumous (yellow card) 64'; Rathi (yellow card) 77'	Report	Silva (yellow card) 10'; Wangjam (yellow card) 90+4'	Stadium: National Football Stadium; Attendance: 0 Referee: (Jordan) Mohammad Hasan Mahmoud Arafah; Man of the Match: Roy Krishna (ATK Mohun Bagan)

21 August 2021	Bengaluru (India)	0–0	(Bangladesh) Bashundhara Kings	Malé, Maldives
16:00 UTC+5	King (yellow card) 21'; Shrivas (yellow card) 41'	Report	Kazi (yellow card) 45'; Shafiei (yellow card) 47'	Stadium: National Football Stadium; Attendance: 0 Referee: (Indonesia) Thoriq Alkatiri; Man of the Match: Sunil Chhetri (Bengaluru)

24 August 2021	Maziya (Maldives)	2–6	(India) Bengaluru	Malé, Maldives
21:00 UTC+5	Hussain Nihan (yellow card) 44'; Aisam Ibrahim (yellow card) 58'; Mohamed 67'; Takashi Odawara (yellow card) 69'; Abdulla 82'	Report	U. Singh 6'; Rohit Kumar (yellow card) 19'; Silva 19'; Narayanan 36'; Wangjam (yellow card) 45+1'; Augustine 70'; B. Singh 85', 90+2'; Ajay Chhetri (yellow card) 90'	Stadium: National Football Stadium; Attendance: 0 Referee: Thoriq Alkatiri (Indonesia)

=== Durand Cup ===
Group stage

Pos	Team	Pld	W	D	L	GF	GA	GD	Pts	Qualification
1	Bengaluru	3	2	1	0	9	5	+4	7	Knockout stage
2	Delhi	3	1	1	1	4	4	0	4	Knockout stage
3	Kerala Blasters	3	1	0	2	1	3	−2	3	
4	Indian Navy	3	1	0	2	5	7	−2	3	

Source: Khel Now
Rules for classification: 1) points; 2) head-to-head points; 3) head-to-head goal difference; 4) goal difference; 5) number of goals scored; 6) drawing of lots

15 September 2021	Bengaluru	2–0	Kerala Blasters	Kolkata, West Bengal
15:00 IST	Bhutia 45'; Augustine 70'		Sandeep Singh (yellow card) 42' (yellow-red card) 83'; Hormipam (yellow card) 48' (yellow-red card) 62'; Meitei (yellow card) 83' (yellow-red card) 85'	Stadium: Salt Lake Stadium; Man of the Match: Lara Sharma (Bengaluru FC)

18 September 2021	Delhi	2–2	Bengaluru	Kolkata, West Bengal
15:00 IST	Plaza 58', 62'		Narayanan 27'; B. Singh 75'	Stadium: Mohun Bagan Ground

21 September 2021	Bengaluru	5–3	Indian Navy	Kolkata, West Bengal
15:00 IST	Augustine 52'; H. Singh 60', 80'; A. Chhetri 73'; Thoi 90+1'		Jijo 18'; Sreyas 29'; Vijay 90+3'	Stadium: Salt Lake Stadium

Knockout stage

25 September 2021	Bengaluru	3–2	Army Green	Kolkata, West Bengal
15:00 IST	Muirang 20'; Augustine 46'; Bhutia 74'		Lalawmkima 9' (pen.); Vibin 89' (pen.)	Stadium: Salt Lake Stadium

29 September 2021	Goa	2–2 (7–6 p)	Bengaluru	Kolkata, West Bengal
18:00 IST	Murgaonkar 8'; D'Cunha (yellow card) 32'; Tlang 71'; Davis (yellow card) 104'		Narayanan 1', 83'; Kumar (yellow card) 74'; Sharma (yellow card) 75'; Singh (yellow card) 87'	Stadium: Salt Lake Stadium; Referee: (India) Rowan Arumugan; Man of the Match: Edu Bedia (FC Goa)
	Penalties
	Dohling (penalty scored); Tlang (penalty missed); Pereira (penalty scored); D'Cunha (penalty scored); Bedia (penalty scored); Chote (penalty scored); Lalhmangaihsanga (penalty scored); Davis (penalty scored)		(penalty scored) Muirang; (penalty missed) Singh; (penalty scored) Chhetri; (penalty scored) Shrivas; (penalty scored) Bhutia; (penalty scored) Kumar; (penalty scored) Oram; (penalty missed) Lyngdoh

== Management ==
As of 26 April 2022

Position	Name
Head coach	(Germany) Marco Pezzaiuoli
Assistant coach	(Spain) Javier Pinillos
Assistant coach/Reserve team Head Coach	(India) Naushad Moosa
Goalkeeping coach	(Netherlands) Stefan Toonen
Physiotherapist	(Spain) Senen Alvarez
Team manager	(India) Rosewall Da Cunha
Video analyst	(India) Alwin Lawrence
Masseur	(India) Manu Prasad
Kit Boy	(India) Gireesh PM

== Player statistics ==
As of 24 April 2022

=== Appearances and goals ===
No.	Pos	Nat	Player	Total		ISL		AFC Cup	
No.	Pos	Nat	Player	Apps	Goals	Apps	Goals	Apps	Goals
Goalkeepers
1	GK	(India) IND	Gurpreet Singh Sandhu	19	0	15+0	0	4+0	0
30	GK	(India) IND	Lara Sharma	5	0	5+0	0	0+0	0
43	GK	(India) IND	Sharon Padattil	0	0	0+0	0	0+0	0
Defenders
4	DF	(India) IND	Pratik Chaudhari	19	1	11+6	1	1+1	0
5	DF	(Brazil) BRA	Alan Costa	22	2	17+1	2	4+0	0
15	DF	(India) IND	Wungngayam Muirang	5	0	3+2	0	0+0	0
16	DF	(India) IND	Sarthak Golui	7	0	0+3	0	3+1	0
19	DF	(India) IND	Ajith Kumar	8	0	4+1	0	0+3	0
25	DF	(India) IND	Namgyal Bhutia	7	0	3+4	0	0+0	0
27	DF	(India) IND	Parag Shrivas	16	0	10+4	0	1+1	0
29	DF	(Gabon) GAB	Yrondu Musavu-King	5	0	2+0	0	3+0	0
35	DF	(India) IND	Biswa Kumar Darjee	0	0	0+0	0	0+0	0
Midfielders
6	MF	(Brazil) BRA	Bruno Ramires	20	0	20+0	0	0+0	0
7	MF	(India) IND	Jayesh Rane	13	2	8+1	1	4+0	1
8	MF	(India) IND	Suresh Singh Wangjam	20	0	15+1	0	4+0	0
10	MF	(Iran) IRI	Iman Basafa	7	1	3+4	1	0+0	0
12	MF	(India) IND	Danish Farooq Bhat	21	3	11+6	3	1+3	0
18	MF	(India) IND	Rohit Kumar	11	0	0+9	0	2+0	0
20	MF	(India) IND	Ajay Chhetri	6	0	3+1	0	1+1	0
22	MF	(India) IND	Ashique Kuruniyan	14	1	13+0	1	1+0	0
31	MF	(India) IND	Leon Augustine	7	1	0+3	0	1+3	1
32	MF	(India) IND	Roshan Singh	21	1	17+0	1	3+1	0
40	MF	(India) IND	Damaitphang Lyngdoh	3	0	0+3	0	0+0	0
Forwards
9	FW	(Republic of the Congo) CGO	Prince Ibara	17	4	13+4	4	0+0	0
11	FW	(India) IND	Sunil Chhetri	23	4	14+6	4	3+0	0
14	FW	(India) IND	Harmanpreet Singh	0	0	0+0	0	0+0	0
17	FW	(India) IND	Edmund Lalrindika	3	0	1+2	0	0+0	0
21	FW	(India) IND	Udanta Singh	20	4	13+4	3	3+0	1
23	FW	(Brazil) BRA	Cleiton Silva	23	10	17+2	9	4+0	1
26	FW	(India) IND	Bidyashagar Singh	7	2	0+3	0	1+3	2
39	FW	(India) IND	Sivasakthi Narayanan	9	1	0+7	0	0+2	1
42	FW	(India) IND	Akashdeep Singh	0	0	0+0	0	0+0	0

- Source: soccerway

Updated: 24 April 2022

=== Goal scorers ===
Rank	No.	Pos	Nat	Player	ISL	AFC	Total
1	23	FW	(Brazil)	Cleiton Silva	9	1	10
2	9	FW	(Republic of the Congo)	Prince Ibara	4	0	4
2	11	FW	(India)	Sunil Chhetri	4	0	4
2	21	FW	(India)	Udanta Singh	3	1	4
3	12	MF	(India)	Danish Farooq Bhat	3	0	3
4	26	FW	(India)	Bidyashagar Singh	0	2	2
4	5	DF	(Brazil)	Alan Costa	2	0	2
4	7	MF	(India)	Jayesh Rane	1	1	2
5	4	DF	(India)	Pratik Chaudhari	1	0	1
5	10	MF	(Iran)	Iman Basafa	1	0	1
5	22	MF	(India)	Ashique Kuruniyan	1	0	1
5	32	MF	(India)	Roshan Singh	1	0	1
5	36	MF	(India)	Leon Augustine	0	1	1
5	39	FW	(India)	Sivasakthi Narayanan	0	1	1
Total					30	7	37

Source: soccerway
Updated: 24 April 2021

=== Clean sheets ===
Rank	No.	Pos	Nat	Player	ISL	AFC	Total
1	1	GK	(India)	Gurpreet Singh Sandhu	3	2	5
2	30	GK	(India)	Lara Sharma	3	0	3
TOTALS					6	2	8

Source: soccerway
Updated: 26 April 2022

=== Disciplinary record ===
Rank	No.	Pos	Nat	Player	ISL		AFC		Total		Notes
Rank	No.	Pos	Nat	Player	Yellow card	Red card	Yellow card	Red card	Yellow card	Red card	Notes
1	8	MF	(India)	Suresh Singh Wangjam	0	0	2	0	2	0	
1	23	FW	(Brazil)	Cleiton Silva	0	0	2	0	2	0	
2	20	MF	(India)	Ajay Chhetri	0	0	1	0	1	0	
2	18	MF	(India)	Rohit Kumar	0	0	1	0	1	0	
2	21	FW	(India)	Udanta Singh	0	0	1	0	1	0	
2	27	DF	(India)	Parag Shrivas	0	0	1	0	1	0	
2	29	DF	(Gabon)	Yrondu Musavu-King	0	0	1	0	1	0	

Source: soccerway
Updated: 28 August 2021

== See also ==
- 2021–22 in Indian football
