= 2021–22 in Indian football =

Indian football season

Football in India
- Season: 2021–22

Men's football
- ISL: Shield: Jamshedpur; Cup: Hyderabad
- I-League: Gokulam Kerala
- I-League 2nd Div.: Rajasthan United

Women's football
- IWL: Gokulam Kerala

The 2021–22 season was the 134th competitive association football season in India.

== Men's national team ==
=== India senior national football team ===
==== 2022 FIFA World Cup qualification ====
3 June 2021	India	0–1	Qatar	Doha, Qatar
22:30 IST		Report	Hatem 33'	Stadium: Jassim Bin Hamad Stadium; Referee: Ma Ning (China)

7 June 2021	Bangladesh	0–2	India	Doha, Qatar
19:30 IST		Report	Chhetri 79', 90+2'	Stadium: Jassim Bin Hamad Stadium; Referee: Zaid Thamer Mohammed (Iraq)

15 June 2021	India	1–1	Afghanistan	Doha, Qatar
19:30 IST	Azizi 75' (o.g.)	Report	Zamani 82'	Stadium: Jassim Bin Hamad Stadium; Referee: Ali Reda (Lebanon)

==== Friendlies (2021) ====
2 September 2021	Nepal	1–1	India	Kathmandu, Nepal
17:30 UTC+5:45	Bista 36'	Report	Thapa 60'	Stadium: Dasharath Rangasala

5 September 2021	Nepal	1–2	India	Kathmandu, Nepal
17:30 UTC+5:45	Tamang 87'	Report	Choudhary 62'; Chhetri 80'	Stadium: Dasharath Rangasala

==== SAFF Championship ====
4 October 2021	Bangladesh	1–1	India	Malé, Maldives
16:00 UTC+5:00	Arafat 74'	Report	Chhetri 26'	Stadium: National Football Stadium; Referee: Majed Al-Shamrani (Saudi Arabia)

7 October 2021	India	0–0	Sri Lanka	Malé, Maldives
16:00 UTC+5:00		Report		Stadium: National Football Stadium

10 October 2021	Nepal	0–1	India	Malé, Maldives
21:00 UTC+5:00		Report	Chhetri 82'	Stadium: National Football Stadium

13 October 2021	India	3–1	Maldives	Malé, Maldives
21:00 UTC+5:00	M. Singh 33'; Chhetri 62', 71'	Report	Ashfaq 45' (pen.)	Stadium: National Football Stadium

16 October 2021 Final	India	3–0	Nepal	Malé
20:00 UTC+5:00				Stadium: National Football Stadium

==== Friendlies (2022) ====
23 March 2022	Bahrain	2–1	India	Riffa, Bahrain
19:00 UTC+3:00	Al-Hardan 37'; Al-Humaidan 88'	Report	Bheke 59'	Stadium: Bahrain National Stadium; Referee: Sadam Omara (Jordan)

26 March 2022	India	0–3	Belarus	Riffa, Bahrain
19:00 UTC+3:00		Report	Bykov 48'; Solovey 68'; Gromyko 90+2'	Stadium: Bahrain National Stadium; Referee: Ismaeel Habib (Bahrain)

11 May 2022	India	1–2	(India) ATK Mohun Bagan	Kolkata, India
	Chhetri	Report	Liston Kiyan	Stadium: Salt Lake Stadium

17 May 2022	India	2–0	(India) I-League Stars	Kolkata, India
		Report		Stadium: TBD

29 May 2022	India	0–2	Jordan	Doha, Qatar
				Stadium: TBD

=== Olympic team ===
==== AFC U-23 Asian Cup qualifiers ====
24 October 2021 2022 AFC U23 Q	Oman	1–2	India	Fujairah, United Arab Emirates
20:30 UTC+4	Al-Musalmi 89'	Report (AFC); Report (AIFF)	Ali 7' (pen.); V. P. Singh 38'	Stadium: Fujairah Stadium; Attendance: 25; Referee: Alireza Faghani (Iran)

27 October 2021 2022 AFC U23 Q	India	0–1	United Arab Emirates	Fujairah, United Arab Emirates
20:30 UTC+4		Report	Idrees 82' (pen.)	Stadium: Fujairah Stadium; Attendance: 100; Referee: Fu Ming (China)

30 October 2021 2022 AFC U23 Q	India	0–0 (a.e.t.) (4–2 p)	Kyrgyzstan	Fujairah, United Arab Emirates
20:30 UTC+4		Report		Stadium: Fujairah Stadium; Referee: Javiz Mohamed (Maldives)
	Penalties
	Praveen (penalty scored); Danu (penalty scored); Wangjam (penalty scored); Rai (penalty missed); Ali (penalty scored)		(penalty missed) Artykbaev; (penalty missed) Artiukov; (penalty scored) Sharshenbekov; (penalty scored) Tashiev

== Women's national team ==
=== India women's national football team ===
==== Friendlies (2021) ====
2 October	United Arab Emirates	1–4	India	Dubai, United Arab Emirates
	Salha 50'	Report	Manisha K. 20'; Xaxa 27'; Sweety 41'; Anju 75'	Stadium: Theyab Awana Stadium

4 October	India	0–1	Tunisia	Dubai, United Arab Emirates
		Report	Heuji	Stadium: TBA

10 October	Bahrain	0–5	India	Manama, Bahrain
		Report	Basfore 13'; Xaxa 19', 68'; Kathiresan 34'; Manisha K. 69'	Stadium: Hamad Town Stadium

13 October	India	1–0	Chinese Taipei	Hamad Town, Bahrain
20:30 IST	Renu 3'	Report (AIFF); Report (Soccerway)		Stadium: Hamad Town Stadium

20 October	Hammarby IF	3–2	India	Stockholm, Sweden
	Jakobsson 36'; Sundstrom 52'; Chanu 78' (o.g.)	Report (article); Report (detailed)	Kathiresan 30'; Panna 40'	Stadium: Hammarby IP

23 October	Djurgårdens IF	1–0	India	Stockholm, Sweden
	Fanny Lång 43'	Report (article); Report (detailed)		Stadium: Stockholm Olympic Stadium

==== Tournament of Manaus ====
25 November	Brazil	6–1	India	Manaus, Brazil
21:00 (UTC−04:00)	Debinha 1'; Gio 37'; Ary Borges 52', 81'; Kerolin 54'; Geyse 76'	Report	Kalyan 8'	Stadium: Arena da Amazônia; Referee: Daiane Caroline Muniz dos Santos (Brazil)

28 November	India	0–3	Chile	Manaus, Brazil
17:00 (UTC−04:00)		Report	Urrutia 13'; Hernández 84'; Araya 85'	Stadium: Arena da Amazônia; Referee: Rejane Caetano da Silva (Brazil)

1 December	Venezuela	2–1	India	Manaus, Brazil
17:00 (UTC−04:00)	Speckmaier 50'; Olivieri 81'	Report	Dangmei 18'	Stadium: Arena da Amazônia; Referee: Thayslane de Melo Costa (Brazil)

==== Unofficial friendlies ====
15 December	India	4–0	(India) All Stars	Kochi, India
		Report		Stadium: Panampilly Nagar Ground

17 December	India	3–0	(India) All Stars	Kochi, India
		Report		Stadium: Panampilly Nagar Ground

==== 2022 AFC Women's Asian Cup ====
20 January	India	0–0 (Voided)	Iran	Navi Mumbai, India
19:30 UTC+5:30		Report		Stadium: DY Patil Stadium; Referee: Lara Lee (Australia)

23 January	Chinese Taipei	Cancelled	India	Navi Mumbai, India
19:30 UTC+5:30		Report		Stadium: DY Patil Stadium

26 January	India	Cancelled	China	Mumbai, India
19:30 UTC+5:30		Report		Stadium: Mumbai Football Arena

==== Friendlies (2022) ====
5 April	India	1–0	Egypt	Zarqa, Jordan
22:00 UTC+3	Priyangka 32'	Report		Stadium: Prince Mohammed Stadium; Attendance: 100; Referee: Haneen Murad (Jordan)

8 April	Jordan	0–1	India	Zarqa, Jordan
22:30 UTC+3		Report	Manisha 48'	Stadium: Prince Mohammed Stadium; Attendance: 350; Referee: Osama Hasan (Jordan)

=== Women's U-20 ===
==== 2021 SAFF U-19 Women's Championship ====
13 December	India	5–0	Sri Lanka	Dhaka, Bangladesh
19:00 BST (UTC+06:00)	Santosh 2'; Karen 5'; Linda 9', 41'; Priyangka 82'			Stadium: BSSS M. Kamal Stadium; Referee: Tshering Yangkhey (Bhutan)

15 December	India	3–0	Bhutan	Dhaka, Bangladesh
19:00 BST (UTC+06:00)	Sumati 7'; Priyangka 41', 53'			Stadium: BSSS M. Kamal Stadium

17 December	Bangladesh	1–0	India	Dhaka, Bangladesh
15:00 BST (UTC+06:00)		Report		Stadium: BSSS M. Kamal Stadium

19 December	Nepal	0–1	India	Dhaka, Bangladesh
15:00 BST (UTC+06:00)			Priyangka 67'	Stadium: BSSS M. Kamal Stadium

== AFC competitions ==
=== 2021 AFC Cup ===
==== Playoff round ====
South Asia Zone
Team 1	Score	Team 2
Bengaluru (India)	1–0	(Maldives) Eagles

==== Group D ====
Pos	Team	Pld	W	D	L	GF	GA	GD	Pts	Qualification	MBSG	BSK	BFC	MAZ
1	(India) ATK Mohun Bagan	3	2	1	0	6	2	+4	7	Inter-zone play-off semi-finals	—	1–1	2–0	—
2	(Bangladesh) Bashundhara Kings	3	1	2	0	3	1	+2	5		—	—	—	2–0
3	(India) Bengaluru	3	1	1	1	6	4	+2	4		—	0−0	—	—
4	(Maldives) Maziya (H)	3	0	0	3	3	11	−8	0		1–3	—	2–6	—

Source: AFC
(H) Hosts

==== Inter-zone play-off semi-finals ====
Team 1	Score	Team 2
(Uzbekistan) Nasaf	6–0	(India) ATK Mohun Bagan

=== 2021 AFC Women's Club Championship ===
Pos	Team	Pld	W	D	L	GF	GA	GD	Pts
1	(Jordan) Amman (H, C)	3	2	0	1	4	3	+1	6 (Note: Head-to-head points: Amman 3, Shahrdari Sirjan 0.)
2	(Iran) Shahrdari Sirjan	3	2	0	1	4	3	+1	6
3	(India) Gokulam Kerala	3	1	0	2	4	4	0	3
4	(Uzbekistan) Bunyodkor	3	1	0	2	3	5	−2	3

Source: AFC
Rules for classification: Group stage tiebreakers
(C) Champions; (H) Hosts

=== 2022 AFC Champions League ===
Pos	Team	Pld	W	D	L	GF	GA	GD	Pts	Qualification	SHB	MUM	QWJ	AJZ
1	(Saudi Arabia) Al-Shabab (H)	6	5	1	0	18	1	+17	16	Advance to Round of 16	—	6–0	3–0	3–0
2	(India) Mumbai City	6	2	1	3	3	11	−8	7 (Note: Head-to-head points: Mumbai City 6, Al-Quwa Al-Jawiya 0.)		0–3	—	1–0	0–0
3	(Iraq) Al-Quwa Al-Jawiya	6	2	1	3	7	10	−3	7		1–1	1–2	—	3–2
4	(United Arab Emirates) Al-Jazira	6	1	1	4	4	10	−6	4		0–2	1–0	1–2	—

Source: AFC
(H) Hosts

=== 2022 AFC Cup ===
==== Preliminary round 2 ====
South Asia Zone
Team 1	Score	Team 2
ATK Mohun Bagan (India)	5–0	(Sri Lanka) Blue Star

==== Play-off round ====
South Asia Zone
Team 1	Score	Team 2
ATK Mohun Bagan (India)	3–1	(Bangladesh) Abahani Limited Dhaka

==== Group D ====
Pos	Team	Pld	W	D	L	GF	GA	GD	Pts	Qualification	MBSG	BSK	MAZ	GOK
1	(India) ATK Mohun Bagan (H)	3	2	0	1	11	6	+5	6 (Note: Head-to-head points: ATK Mohun Bagan 3, Bashundhara Kings 0.)	Inter-zone play-off semi-finals	—	4–0	—	—
2	(Bangladesh) Bashundhara Kings	3	2	0	1	3	5	−2	6		—	—	1–0	—
3	(Maldives) Maziya	3	1	0	2	3	6	−3	3 (Note: Head-to-head points: Maziya 3, Gokulam Kerala 0.)		2–5	—	—	1–0
4	(India) Gokulam Kerala	3	1	0	2	5	5	0	3		4–2	1–2	—	—

Source: AFC
(H) Hosts

== Club competitions ==
=== Indian Super League ===
==== Regular season ====
Pos	Team	Pld	W	D	L	GF	GA	GD	Pts	Qualification
1	Jamshedpur (L)	20	13	4	3	42	21	+21	43	Qualification to ISL playoffs and Playoffs for 2023–24 AFC Champions League group stage
2	Hyderabad (Note: Hyderabad qualified for Playoffs for 2023–24 AFC Cup qualifying playoffs by winning the ISL playoffs) (C)	20	11	5	4	43	23	+20	38	Qualification to ISL playoffs and Playoffs for 2023–24 AFC Cup qualifying playoffs
3	ATK Mohun Bagan	20	10	7	3	37	26	+11	37	Qualification to ISL playoffs
4	Kerala Blasters	20	9	7	4	34	24	+10	34	Qualification to ISL playoffs
5	Mumbai City	20	9	4	7	36	31	+5	31	
6	Bengaluru	20	8	5	7	32	27	+5	29	
7	Odisha	20	6	5	9	31	43	−12	23	
8	Chennaiyin	20	5	5	10	17	35	−18	20	
9	Goa	20	4	7	9	29	35	−6	19	
10	NorthEast United	20	3	5	12	25	43	−18	14	
11	East Bengal	20	1	8	11	18	36	−18	11	

Source: Indian Super League
Rules for classification: 1) points; 2) head-to-head points; 3) head-to-head goal difference; 4) head-to-head goals scored; 5) goal difference; 6) number of goals scored; 7) fair play ranking; 8) drawing of lots
(C) Champions; (L) League Winners' Shield Winners

==== Playoffs ====
Semi-finals
1	Jamshedpur	0	1	1
4	Kerala Blasters	1	1	2
2	Hyderabad	3	0	3
3	ATK Mohun Bagan	1	1	2

Final
4	Kerala Blasters	1 (1)
2	Hyderabad (p)	1 (3)

=== I-League ===
Pos	Team	Pld	W	D	L	GF	GA	GD	Pts	Qualification (Note: Teams were split into two groups, Championship Stage (Group A) and Relegation Stage (Group B) after each team had played 12 matches.)
1	Gokulam Kerala (C)	18	13	4	1	44	15	+29	43	Champions and qualification for the play–offs for 2023–24 AFC Cup group stage spot
2	Mohammedan	18	11	4	3	34	18	+16	37	
3	Churchill Brothers	18	9	4	5	24	22	+2	31	
4	Sreenidi Deccan	18	8	6	4	27	19	+8	30	
5	RoundGlass Punjab	18	8	4	6	33	29	+4	28	
6	Rajasthan United	18	5	7	6	16	16	0	22	
7	NEROCA	18	4	8	6	21	30	−9	20	
8	Aizawl	17	7	0	10	23	26	−3	21	
9	TRAU	17	4	6	7	15	17	−2	18	
10	Indian Arrows	17	4	5	8	10	23	−13	17	
11	Sudeva Delhi	17	4	5	8	13	23	−10	17	
12	Real Kashmir	17	2	8	7	23	31	−8	14	
13	Kenkre (R)	17	3	3	11	11	25	−14	12	Relegation to 2022–23 I-League 2nd Division

Source: Hero I-League
Rules for classification: 1) points; 2) head-to-head points; 3) head-to-head goal difference; 4) goal difference; 5) number of goals scored; 6) drawing of lots
(C) Champions; (R) Relegated

=== Durand Cup ===
Quarterfinals
Mohammedan	1
Gokulam Kerala	0
Army Red	-
Bengaluru United (w.o.)	-
Goa	5
Delhi	1
Bengaluru	3
Army Green	2

Semifinals
Mohammedan (a.e.t.)	4
Bengaluru United	2
Goa (p)	2(7)
Bengaluru	2(6)

Final
Mohammedan	0
Goa (a.e.t.)	1

=== State football leagues ===
The following clubs were confirmed by their state football associations for the 2022–23 season of I-League 2.

No.	State	Qualifying tournament		Selected	City	Position
No.	State	Name	Season	Selected	City	Position
1	Chhattisgarh	Chhattisgarh State Men's Football League Championship	2021–22	RKM FA	Narainpur	Champions
2	Delhi	Delhi Football League	2021–22	Delhi FC	New Delhi	Champions
3	Goa	Goa Professional League	2021–22	Dempo SC	Panjim	Champions
4	Gujarat	Gujarat SFA Club Championship	2021–22	ARA FC	Ahmedabad	Runners-up
5	Himachal Pradesh	Himachal Football League	2022	Techtro Swades United FC	Una	Champions
6	Karnataka	Bangalore Football League	2021–22	FC Bengaluru United	Bengaluru	Champions
7	Kerala	Kerala Premier League	2021–22	Golden Threads FC	Kochi	Champions
8	Madhya Pradesh	Madhya Pradesh Premier League	2021–22	The Diamond Rock FC	Balaghat	3rd place
9	Maharashtra	Mumbai Football League	2021–22	Ambernath United Atlanta FC	Ambernath	Champions
10	Punjab	Punjab State Super Football League	2021–22	Jagat Singh Palahi FC	Phagwara	3rd place
11	West Bengal	Calcutta Football League	2021–22	United SC	Kolkata	Semi-finalist

The following clubs were not allowed to participate by the state football associations for the 2022–23 season of I-League 2.

No.	State	Qualifying tournament		Selected	City	Position
No.	State	Name	Season	Selected	City	Position
1	Manipur	Manipur State League	2021–22	KLASA FC	Bishnupur	Champions

=== Reliance Foundation Development League ===
Pos	Team	Pld	W	D	L	GF	GA	GD	Pts	Qualification
1	Bengaluru (Q)	5	5	0	0	14	2	+12	15	Advance to Next Gen Cup
2	Kerala Blasters	5	4	0	1	7	3	+4	12	Advance to Next Gen Cup
3	Jamshedpur	5	2	1	2	10	6	+4	7	
4	Hyderabad	5	2	1	2	10	7	+3	7	
5	Young Champs	5	2	1	2	4	4	0	7	
6	Goa	5	2	1	2	8	10	−2	7	
7	Chennaiyin	5	0	2	3	2	7	−5	2	
8	Mumbai City	5	0	0	5	0	16	−16	0	

Updated to match(es) played on unknown. Source:
Rules for classification: 1) points; 2) head-to-head points; 3) head-to-head goal difference; 4) goal difference; 5) number of goals scored; 6) play-off match
(Q) Qualified for the phase indicated

=== Indian Women's League ===
==== Qualification ====
The following four teams from four states played each other once during April in the qualifying round at the Ambedkar Stadium in New Delhi.

Pos	Team	Pld	W	D	L	GF	GA	GD	Pts	Qualification
1	ARA Women (Q)	3	3	0	0	27	3	+24	9	Qualification for the final round
2	Young Welfare Club	3	2	0	1	9	4	+5	6	
3	Guwahati City FC	3	0	1	2	0	14	−14	1	
4	Golazo FC	3	0	1	2	0	15	−15	1	

Source: AIFF
Rules for classification: 1) points; 2) head-to-head points; 3) head-to-head goal difference; 4) goal difference; 5) number of goals scored; 6) drawing of lots
(Q) Qualified for the phase indicated

==== Main round ====
Pos	Team	Pld	W	D	L	GF	GA	GD	Pts	Qualification
1	Gokulam Kerala Women	5	5	0	0	37	1	+36	15	Champions and Qualification for the 2022 AFC Women's Club Championship
2	Sethu	5	5	0	0	19	2	+17	15	
3	Kickstart Women	5	4	0	1	14	3	+11	12	
4	Sports Odisha	5	3	1	1	15	3	+12	10	
5	Indian Arrows Women	5	3	1	1	10	3	+7	10	
6	SSB Women	5	3	0	2	16	9	+7	9	
7	ARA Women	5	2	0	3	9	10	−1	6	
8	PIFA Sports	5	1	1	3	8	12	−4	4	
9	Mata Rukmani Girls	5	1	0	4	5	24	−19	3	
10	Odisha Police	5	1	0	4	2	21	−19	3	
11	Sirvodem Sporting	5	0	1	4	1	25	−24	1	
12	Hans Women	5	0	0	5	4	27	−23	0	

Updated to match(es) played on 1 May 2022. Source: AIFF
Rules for classification: 1) points; 2) head-to-head points; 3) head-to-head goal difference; 4) goal difference; 5) number of goals scored; 6) drawing of lots

=== AIFF Futsal Club Championship ===
==== Knock-out stage ====
- Bracket

Semi-finals
Mohammedan SC (Kolkata)	2
Bengaluru FC	0
Delhi FC	12
Mangala Club	7

Final
Mohammedan SC (Kolkata)	2
Delhi FC	7

== New clubs ==
Club	Formation	Location	League	Tier
SC Bengaluru	4 April 2022	Bengaluru, Karnataka	Bangalore Super Division	4th
