= Danish Farooq Bhat =

Indian footballer (born 1996)

Personal information
- Full name: Danish Farooq Bhat
- Date of birth: 9 May 1996 (age 30)
- Place of birth: Srinagar, Jammu and Kashmir, India
- Height: 1.85 m (6 ft 1 in)
- Position: Central midfielder

Team information
- Current team: East Bengal

Youth career
- 2009–2015: J&K Bank Football Club

Senior career*
Years	Team	Apps	(Gls)
2015–2016	Lonestar Kashmir	18	(0)
2016–2021	Real Kashmir	62	(10)
2021–2023	Bengaluru	27	(4)
2023–2026	Kerala Blasters	56	(3)
2026–	East Bengal	0	(0)

International career^{‡}
2022–	India	6	(0)
Medal record
Representing India
CAFA Nations Cup
Third place	2025 Tajikistan–Uzbekistan	Team
- * Club domestic league appearances and goals as of 16:30, 18 April 2026 (UTC) ‡ National team caps and goals as of 19:30, 8 September 2025 (UTC)

Danish Farooq Bhat (born 9 May 1996) is an Indian professional footballer who plays as a midfielder for Indian Super League club East Bengal and the Indian national team.

== Club career ==
=== Early career ===
Danish started his early football career with a local team Chinar Valley FC. Later, Danish joined the J&K Bank Football Academy at the age of 13, where he would become the team captain eventually at his age group level teams. He would go on to win 12 local leagues and tournaments with his team prior to joining Lonestar Kashmir in 2015. He would play for Lonestar Kashmir in the 2015–16 I-League 2nd Division season, where he would help his team reach the final round of the league as his team fell short of promotion to the I-League.

=== Real Kashmir ===
In the later half of 2016, he joined Real Kashmir where he was given the number 10 shirt. With 4 strikes, Danish was the joint highest goal-scorer for Real Kashmir in the 2017–18 season. He had the most number of assists to his name during this season as his team became the champions of 2017–18 I-League 2nd Division and won promotion to the I-League. He is one among two Kashmir-born players for Real Kashmir in the first-team squad who have played regularly in this season of I-League.

=== Bengaluru ===
On 25 July 2021, it was announced that Danish had joined Indian Super League club Bengaluru on a two-year deal. On August 15, he made his debut in a 1–0 2021 AFC Cup play-off round win against Maldivian club Eagles. On 24 November, he made his ISL debut as a substitute for Jayesh Rane in a 3–1 loss against Odisha. Danish scored his first ever ISL goal in a 3–3 draw against ATK Mohun Bagan on 16 December.

=== Kerala Blasters ===
On 31 January 2023, Danish joined Indian Super League club Kerala Blasters on a three-and-a-half-year deal for a reported fee of ₹2.5 million. He made his debut for the Blasters on 3 November in a 1–0 loss against East Bengal by coming as a substitute for Jeakson Singh in the 75th minute.

After his debut season, Danish played his first match of the 2023–24 season on 13 August 2023 against Gokulam Kerala FC in the 2023 Durand Cup tournament as a substitute for Jeakson Singh, which they lost 3–4. He scored his first goal for the club on 21 August against Indian Air Force. He also assisted Bidyashagar's goal and helped in a 5–0 victory. Danish scored his first league goal for the club in the league on 8 October against Mumbai City, in a 2–1 loss.

== International career ==
In March 2022, Danish was called up for the national squad by coach Igor Štimac ahead of India's two friendly matches against Bahrain and Belarus. He made his debut on 23 March against Bahrain in their 2–1 defeat.

After three years out of the squad, newly appointed India coach Khalid Jamil called Danish up as part of the squad for the CAFA Nations Cup. He made his first national team appearance since 2022 in the first match of the tournament against host team Tajikistan on 29 August 2025, coming on as a 55th-minute substitute in a 2–1 win for India.

== Playing style ==
Danish earned the moniker of ‘Kashmiri Ronaldo' by fellow footballers and aficionados of the state, demonstrated by his dribbling skills and goal-scoring.

== Personal life ==
Danish was born in the Downtown neighbourhood of Srinagar in the Kashmir Valley of Jammu and Kashmir.

Danish was inspired by his father, Farooq Ahmad, who was a professional footballer two decades before him. Ahmad represented the Jammu and Kashmir state team in Santosh Trophy and also played for Kolkata giant Mohammedan Sporting.

== Career statistics ==
=== Club ===
As of 16 August 2023

Club	Season	League			Cup		Continental		Other		Total	
Club	Season	Division	Apps	Goals	Apps	Goals	Apps	Goals	Apps	Goals	Apps	Goals
Lonestar Kashmir	2015–16	I-League 2nd Division	18	0	–	–	–	–	–	–	18	0
Lonestar Kashmir	Total		18	0	–	–	–	–	–	–	18	0
Real Kashmir	2016–17	I-League 2nd Division	5	0	–	–	–	–	–	–	5	0
Real Kashmir	2017–18	I-League 2nd Division	9	3	0	0	–	–	3 (Note: Appearances in the 2017–18 I-League 2nd Division final Round)	1	12	4
Real Kashmir	2018–19	I-League	19	2	1 (Note: Appearances in the 2019 Indian Super Cup)	0	–	–	0	0	20	2
Real Kashmir	2019–20	I-League	15	2	0	0	–	–	4 (Note: Appearances in the 2019 Durand Cup)	1	19	3
Real Kashmir	2020–21	I-League	14	3	0	0	–	–	5	3	19	6
Real Kashmir	Total		62	10	1	0	–	–	12	5	75	15
Bengaluru	2021–22	Indian Super League	17	3	–	–	4	0	–	–	21	3
Bengaluru	2022–23	Indian Super League	10	1	–	–	0	0	4 (Note: Appearances in the 2022 Durand Cup)	0	14	1
Bengaluru	Total		27	4	0	0	4	0	4	0	35	4
Kerala Blasters	2022–23	Indian Super League	6	0	1	0	–	–	–	–	7	0
Kerala Blasters	2023–24	Indian Super League	–	–	–	–	–	–	1	0	1	0
Kerala Blasters	Total		6	0	1	0	–	–	1	0	8	0
Career total			110	14	2	0	4	0	17	5	136	19

=== International ===
As of 8 September 2025

National team	Year	Apps	Goals
India	2022	2	0
India	2025	4	0
Total		6	0

== Honours ==
Real Kashmir

- I-League 2nd Division: 2017–18
- IFA Shield: 2020

Bengaluru

- Durand Cup: 2022

== See also ==
- Basit Ahmed Bhat
- Muheet Shabir
