= Muhammed Nemil =

Indian footballer

Personal information
- Full name: Muhammed Nemil Valiyattil
- Date of birth: 18 March 2002 (age 24)
- Place of birth: Kozhikode, Kerala, India
- Height: 1.68 m (5 ft 6 in)
- Position: Attacking midfielder

Team information
- Current team: Goa
- Number: 44

Youth career
- 2015–2020: RFYC

Senior career*
Years	Team	Apps	(Gls)
2020–	Goa	38	(2)
2020–2021	→ Grama (loan)	1	(0)
- * Club domestic league appearances and goals as of 18:16, 18 May 2026 (UTC)

Muhammed Nemil Valiyattil (born 18 March 2002) is an Indian professional footballer who plays as an attacking midfielder for Indian Super League club Goa.

== Club career ==
=== Youth and early career with RFYC ===
Born in Kozhikode, Kerala, Nemil started playing football through V. P. Sathyan Soccer Academy at the age of ten. In 2015, he was scouted by Reliance Foundation Young Champs (RFYC) academy as a part of a nationwide young talent hunt. His dribbling skill, passing accuracy and two-footed shooting ability earned him praises at the RFYC in Navi Mumbai. In his first three years at RFYC, Nemil registered 45 goals and 31 assists across various youth level competitions. His strong performances earned him trips to England in 2016 and Japan in 2018, where the RFYC took on the local teams.

Nemil won the Best Player Award at the 2018 U-17 Subroto Cup, and was also named the Mumbai District Football Association Super Division's best midfielder in 2019. He won the 2019 Vedanta Youth Cup with RFYC team as he scored the winner in the final against Bengaluru FC and was awarded another Player of the Tournament title. In March 2019, RFYC sent Nemil to Marcet High-performance academy in Spain, on his consistent display of quality with the academy. During his time in Spain, Nemil had a successful trail at Barcelona-based club FE Grama.

=== FC Goa ===
On 20 October 2020, FC Goa announced that the club had reached an agreement with RFYC for the transfer of Nemil. He joined the Indian Super League club on a four-year deal.

==== Loan to FE Grama ====
After joining Goa, Nemail was sent back to Spain for joining FE Grama on a season-long loan. He played 11 games for FE Grama U19s in the Liga Nacional Juvenil and scored 7 goals, including 2 hat-tricks. Promoted to the senior team, Nemil made his debut against CP San Cristóbal in the Tercera División.

==== Return to Goa ====
After his successful loan spell with FE Grama, Nemil returned to Goa ahead of the 2021–22 Indian Super League. On 7 September 2021, he made his debut as a substitute in a 2–0 group-stage win over Army Green in the 2021 Durand Cup. On 13 September, he scored his first goal for the club against Sudeva Delhi. Goa defeated Mohammedan 1–0 in the 2021 Durand Cup final to win the competition for the first time in club history, with Nemil registering four goals and two assists from six appearances. On 4 December, he made his ISL debut as a substitute for Princeton Rebello against NorthEast United.

== Career statistics ==
=== Club ===
As of 24 October 2025

Club	Season	League			Cup		Continental		Total	
Club	Season	Division	Apps	Goals	Apps	Goals	Apps	Goals	Apps	Goals
Goa	2020–21	Indian Super League	0	0	0	0	—		0	0
Goa	2021–22	Indian Super League	14	0	6 (Note: Appearance(s) in Durand Cup)	4	—		20	4
Goa	2022–23	Indian Super League	0	0	3	2	—		3	2
Goa	2023–24	Indian Super League	6	0	4 (Note: Appearance(s) in Super Cup)	1	—		10	1
Goa	2024–25	Indian Super League	9	0	0	0	—		9	0
Goa	2025–26	Indian Super League	0	0	0	0	2 (Note: Appearance(s) in AFC Cup)	0	2	0
Goa	Goa total		29	0	13	7	2	0	44	7
Grama (loan)	2020–21	Tercera División	1	0	0	0	—		1	0
Career total			30	0	13	7	2	0	45	7

== Honours ==
Goa

- Durand Cup: 2021

== See also ==
- List of Indian football players in foreign leagues
