= Nina Jakobsson =

Swedish footballer

Personal information
- Full name: Nina Alexandra Jakobsson
- Date of birth: 10 November 1994 (age 32)
- Place of birth: Piteå, Sweden
- Height: 1.79 m (5 ft 10 1/2 in)
- Position: Midfielder

Team information
- Current team: AIK Fotboll

Senior career*
Years	Team	Apps	(Gls)
2010–2014	Sunnanå SK	70	(16)
2015–2020	Piteå IF	136	(39)
2021–2022	Hammarby IF	23	(7)
2022–2024	LSK Kvinner	16	(5)
2024–	AIK	22	(5)

International career
2018–	Sweden	2	(0)
- * Club domestic league appearances and goals as of 16 January 2022

Nina Jakobsson (born 10 November 1994) is a Swedish football midfielder who plays for AIK Fotboll in Damallsvenskan. She has won two caps for the Sweden women's national football team.
