= Guwahati City FC =

- Full name: Guwahati City Football Club
- Short name: GCFC
- Founded: 2017
- Ground: Guwahati, Assam
- Capacity: Variable (multiple local venues)
- Owner: Guwahati City FC Pvt Ltd
- League: Guwahati Sports Association League
- Website: https://www.guwahaticityfc.com/

Guwahati City FC (GCFC) is an Indian football club based in Guwahati, Assam. Founded in 2017, the club participates in local football leagues organized by the Guwahati Sports Association and is also involved in futsal, women's football, and grassroots youth development. GCFC is widely recognized for pioneering football initiatives in Assam and for its inclusive approach to youth development.

== History ==
Guwahati City FC (GCFC) was founded in 2017 by four football enthusiasts from Assam with a shared vision to create a structured, inclusive football ecosystem rooted in grassroots development. The founders aimed to address the lack of year-round training, competitions, and professional pathways for young footballers in the region.

The club's first major initiative was a residential summer soccer camp in 2017, organized in collaboration with Shillong Lajong FC, a top-tier I-League club. This camp set the tone for GCFC’s emphasis on training, development, and exposure for youth talent.

In 2018, the club gained early recognition by launching Assam’s first professional futsal competition, the Guwahati Futsal Festival.

GCFC formally entered the competitive football structure in 2019 by joining the Guwahati Sports Association (GSA) C Division League. That same year, it launched the Greater Guwahati Baby League, Assam’s first AIFF-approved Baby League for children aged 6–13.

== Achievements ==
- GSA B Division Champions: 2023–24
- GSA C Division Runners-up: 2022–23
- Assam State Futsal Championship Winners: 2023–24
- Qualified for AIFF Futsal Club Championship: 2023–24
- GSA U-13 League Champions: 2022-23 ,2023–24
- Winners in U8 and U10 categories of the Greater Guwahati Baby League and APRO Baby League: 2019–20
- First club from Assam to participate in the IWL Qualifiers: 2021
- Nominated for AIFF Grassroots Awards: 2023

== Teams ==
Guwahati City FC operates multiple teams across different age groups and categories to support grassroots and elite player development. The club's structure includes:

- Senior Men's Team: Competes in the Guwahati Sports Association League system. As of the 2023–24 season, the team won the GSA B Division and will play in the top division.
- Senior Women's Team: GCFC was the first club from Assam to participate in the Indian Women's League (IWL) Qualifiers in 2021.
- Futsal Team: GCFC won the 2023–24 Assam State Futsal Championship and represented the state in the AIFF Futsal Club Championship.
- Youth Teams: The club fields academy teams across various age groups, including:
- U7, U8, U10, U12, U13, U15, U17, and U21
- GCFC U13 team won the GSA U13 League title in 2023–24.
- Youth teams have won multiple titles in the Greater Guwahati Baby League and APRO Baby League.

These teams are developed through the club’s residential and non-residential academies operated under GCFC Football Schools, with training programs aligned to AIFF grassroots and youth development guidelines.

== Academies and Training Centers ==
Guwahati City FC operates both residential and non-residential football academies under the brand name GCFC Football Schools. These centers are designed to develop football talent across age groups and are affiliated with the All India Football Federation’s grassroots and youth development programs.

- Residential Academy: GCFC runs a full-time residential football academy in partnership with Kaziranga English Academy in Guwahati. The program offers formal education alongside professional football training, targeting players from U13 to U21 levels.
- Non-Residential Training Centers: GCFC operates training centers at multiple locations across Guwahati, offering year-round coaching for children aged 5 to 17. The non-residential programs are based on AIFF-certified curriculums and cater to both boys and girls.
- Community Programs: Through initiatives like the Greater Guwahati Baby League, GCFC has been a pioneer in early-age football development in Assam, engaging over 800 children annually since 2018.

The club emphasizes inclusivity and talent identification through its open trial formats, school partnerships, and scholarship-based outreach for underprivileged players.

GCFC was nominated for the AIFF Grassroots Awards in 2023 in recognition of its youth development work.

== Projects ==
Guwahati City FC (GCFC) has been actively engaged in a variety of football development and community projects aimed at strengthening the grassroots ecosystem and fostering inclusivity in Assam.

- Greater Guwahati Baby League (GGBL): Launched in 2018 in collaboration with the All India Football Federation (AIFF), the GGBL was Assam’s first Baby League. It has involved over 800 children aged 6–13, including 27 girls, and operates with multiple teams and zones throughout the city.
- Guwahati Futsal Festival: In 2018, GCFC organized the first professional futsal competition in Assam, known as the Guwahati Futsal Festival. This event helped promote futsal as a parallel pathway for skill development and urban youth engagement.
- Women's Football Development: GCFC launched its senior women’s team in 2021 and became the first club from Assam to participate in the Indian Women’s League (IWL) Qualifiers, taking a leading role in the advancement of women’s football in the state.
- School and Community Outreach: The club runs regular football festivals, coaching workshops, and talent scouting events in partnership with local schools. These activities aim to provide access to structured football training and life skills education.
- Rural Outreach Program (Planned): GCFC has announced plans to expand its training and talent identification network to rural districts of Assam, aiming to bridge the urban-rural gap in access to professional football training.
- Women's Football Academy (Planned): Building on the success of its senior women’s team, GCFC is preparing to launch a dedicated residential academy for girls, offering year-round training and academic support for U13–U17 athletes.
- International Club Partnership (Upcoming): GCFC is in the process of exploring technical partnerships with international clubs and academies to exchange coaching methodologies and create exposure opportunities for local players and staff.

== Management ==
Guwahati City FC is managed by a team of professionals dedicated to building a sustainable and inclusive football ecosystem in Assam. Founded in 2017 by four football enthusiasts, the club is driven by a vision of grassroots development, competitive excellence, and community engagement.

=== Key Personnel ===
- Director – [Siddhartha Sankar Deka]
- Director – [Darick Ranjan Deka]
- Director – [Kaustab Chakraborty]
- Technical Director – [Sulabh Jung Rana]
- Head of Youth Development – [Vacant]
- Head Coach (Senior Men's Team) – [Bitupon Sonowal]
- Head Coach (Women's Team) – [Vacant]
- Academy Director – [Vacant]

=== Advisory and Partnerships ===
The club has formed strategic partnerships and advisory collaborations to strengthen its technical and developmental capacity:

- Shillong Lajong FC – Partner in the inaugural residential summer camp (2017)
- Kaziranga English Academy – Partner institution for the full-time residential academy

GCFC also works closely with the Guwahati Sports Association (GSA) and the Assam Football Association (AFA) to align its programs with broader state-level football development initiatives.
