= Safiul Rahaman =

Indian footballer

Personal information
- Full name: Safiul Rahaman
- Date of birth: 27 April 1993 (age 33)
- Place of birth: Kolkata, West Bengal, India
- Position: Right back

Team information
- Current team: Mohammedan
- Number: 6

Youth career
- 2014: Milanbithi
- 2015: Rajasthan
- 2016: Mesuerse

Senior career*
Years	Team	Apps	(Gls)
2017	Peerless SC	10	(0)
2018–2023	Mohammedan	42	(0)
2023–24	NEROCA FC	7	(0)
2024–25	Bhawanipore		
2025–	Southern Samity		
- * Club domestic league appearances and goals as of 17:00PM @ 6/5/24(AEST)

Safiul Rahaman (Bengali: সাফিউল রহমান; born 27 April 1993) is an Indian footballer who plays as a defender for Southern Samity in the I-League. He is popularly known as Ripon.

== Career statistics ==
=== Club ===
As of 10 May 2022

Club	Season	League			Cup		AFC		Total	
Club	Season	Division	Apps	Goals	Apps	Goals	Apps	Goals	Apps	Goals
Mohammedan	2018–19	I-League 2nd Division	7	0	0	0	—		7	0
Mohammedan	2019–20	I-League 2nd Division	8	0	1 (Note: Appearance(s) in Durand Cup)	0	—		9	0
Mohammedan	2020–21	I-League	9	0	0	0	—		9	0
Mohammedan	2021–22	I-League	5	0	2	0	—		7	0
Career total			29	0	3	0	0	0	32	0

== Honours ==
Mohammedan Sporting

- Calcutta Football League: 2021
