= Lara Sharma =

Indian footballer

Personal information
- Date of birth: 1 October 1999 (age 27)
- Place of birth: Punjab, India
- Height: 1.92 m (6 ft 4 in)
- Position: Goalkeeper

Team information
- Current team: Goa

Youth career
- 2015–2017: Tata Football Academy

Senior career*
Years	Team	Apps	(Gls)
2017–2018	Indian Arrows	0	(0)
2018–2020	ATK B	10	(0)
2020–2024	Bengaluru	5	(0)
2023–2024	→ Kerala Blasters (loan)	3	(0)
2024–	Goa	0	(0)

International career
2016–2018	India U19	0	(0)
- * Club domestic league appearances and goals as of 12:34, 19 June 2024 (UTC)

Lara Sharma (born 1 October 1999) is an Indian professional footballer who plays as a goalkeeper for Indian Super League club Goa.

== Club career ==
Lara is a product of the Tata Football Academy. He signed for Indian Arrows in 2017. In 2018, he made a move to ATK and played for their reserve team. In 2020, he was signed by Bengaluru FC. Lara was the second-choice goalkeeper for Bengaluru and did not get much playing time there. He won the 2022 Durand Cup with the club. For three seasons, he only made five league appearances for the club. In 2023, Lara was loaned to Kerala Blasters until the end of the 2023–24 season.

== Career statistics ==
=== Club ===
As of 19 June 2024

Club	Season	League			National Cup		League Cup		AFC		Total	
Club	Season	Division	Apps	Goals	Apps	Goals	Apps	Goals	Apps	Goals	Apps	Goals
Indian Arrows	2017–18	I-League	0	0	0	0	—		—		0	0
ATK B	2018–19	I-League 2nd Division	2	0	—		—		—		2	0
ATK B	2019–20	I-League 2nd Division	8	0	—		—		—		8	0
ATK B	Total		10	0	0	0	0	0	0	0	10	0
Bengaluru	2020–21	Indian Super League	0	0	—		—		—		0	0
Bengaluru	2021–22	Indian Super League	5	0	—		5 (Note: Appearance(s) in Durand Cup)	0	—		10	0
Bengaluru	2022–23	Indian Super League	0	0	—		1	0	—		1	0
Bengaluru	Total		5	0	0	0	6	0	0	0	11	0
Bengaluru B	2022–23	I-League 2nd Division	2	0	—		—		—		2	0
Kerala Blasters (loan)	2023–24	Indian Super League	3	0	—		—		—		3	0
Goa	2024–25	Indian Super League	0	0	—		—		—		0	0
Career total			20	0	0	0	6	0	0	0	26	0

== Honours ==
Bengaluru

- Durand Cup: 2022
