= Leon Augustine =

Indian footballer (born 1998)

Personal information
- Full name: Leon Augustine Asokan
- Date of birth: 2 October 1998 (age 28)
- Place of birth: Kozhikode, Kerala, India
- Height: 1.68 m (5 ft 6 in)
- Position: Right winger

Team information
- Current team: Punjab
- Number: 31

Youth career
- 2016–2018: Bengaluru B

Senior career*
| Years | Team | Apps | (Gls) |
| 2018–2023 | Bengaluru B | 19 | (4) |
| 2018–2023 | Bengaluru | 19 | (1) |
| 2023– | Punjab | 22 | (1) |
- * Club domestic league appearances and goals as of 16:30, 20 September 2024 (UTC)

Leon Augustine Asokan (born 2 October 1998) is an Indian professional footballer who plays as a winger for Indian Super League club Punjab.

== Club career ==
Born in Kozhikode, Leon started his youth career at Bengaluru B After one year in the academy and the reserves team he was promoted to the senior squad of Bengaluru and was named in the 30 men squad for the 2018 AFC Cup by Albert Roca. He made his professional debut for the senior side in the AFC Cup against Abahani Limited Dhaka on 14 March 2018 as he came off the bench in the second half of the match which Bengaluru won by 1–0.

Punjab FC

Augustine joined Punjab FC in 2023. He scored his first goal against Odisha FC in September 2024 in the Indian Super League.

== Career statistics ==
=== Club ===
As of 8 April 2023

| Club | Season | League | | | Cup | | Continental | | Total | |
| Club | Season | Division | Apps | Goals | Apps | Goals | Apps | Goals | Apps | Goals |
|---|---|---|---|---|---|---|---|---|---|---|
| Bengaluru B | 2017–18 | I-League 2nd Division | 9 | 0 | 0 | 0 | — | | 9 | 0 |
| Bengaluru B | 2017–18 | I-League 2nd Division | 8 | 3 | 0 | 0 | — | | 8 | 3 |
| Bengaluru B | 2019–20 | I-League 2nd Division | 1 | 0 | 0 | 0 | — | | 1 | 0 |
| Bengaluru B | 2022–23 | I-League 2nd Division | 1 | 1 | 0 | 0 | — | | 1 | 1 |
| Bengaluru B | Bengaluru B total | | 19 | 4 | 0 | 0 | 0 | 0 | 19 | 4 |
| Bengaluru | 2017–18 | Indian Super League | 0 | 0 | 0 | 0 | 1 (Note: Appearance(s) in AFC Cup) | 0 | 1 | 0 |
| Bengaluru | 2019–20 | Indian Super League | 2 | 0 | 3 (Note: Appearance(s) in Durand Cup) | 1 | 3 | 0 | 8 | 1 |
| Bengaluru | 2020–21 | Indian Super League | 9 | 1 | 0 | 0 | — | | 9 | 1 |
| Bengaluru | 2021–22 | Indian Super League | 3 | 0 | 4 | 3 | 4 | 1 | 11 | 4 |
| Bengaluru | 2022–23 | Indian Super League | 5 | 0 | 6 (Note: Appearance(s) in Super Cup) | 0 | — | | 11 | 0 |
| Bengaluru | Bengaluru total | | 19 | 1 | 13 | 4 | 8 | 1 | 40 | 6 |
| Punjab | 2023–24 | Indian Super League | 2 | 0 | 2 | 0 | — | | 4 | 0 |
| Career total | | | 40 | 5 | 15 | 4 | 8 | 1 | 63 | 10 |

== Honours ==
Bengaluru

- Durand Cup: 2022
