= Azharuddin Mallick =

Indian footballer (born 1997)

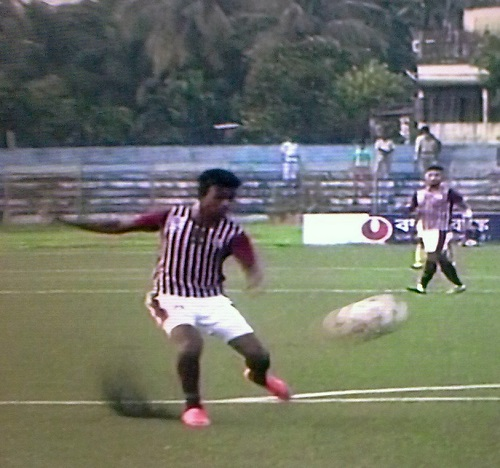

Personal information
- Date of birth: 11 July 1997 (age 29)
- Place of birth: Dankuni, West Bengal, India
- Height: 1.72 m (5 ft 7 1/2 in)
- Position: Winger

Team information
- Current team: Coal India SPA

Youth career
- 2013–2015: United SC

Senior career*
Years	Team	Apps	(Gls)
2015–2019	Mohun Bagan	31	(4)
2020–2021	Bengaluru United	4	(0)
2021–2023	Mohammedan	21	(3)
2023–2025	Delhi		
2025–2026	Howrah Hooghly Warriors FC		
2026–	Coal India SPA		
- * Club domestic league appearances and goals

Azharuddin Mallick (Bengali: আজহারউদ্দিন মল্লিক; born 11 July 1997) is an Indian professional footballer who plays as a winger.

== Career ==
=== United Sports Club ===
Azharuddin made his debut for United S.C. as a young striker. He played for their under 19 team and showed his talent when United Sports Club's under 19 team defeated Pune F.C. under 19 team to reach IFA shield final.

=== Mohun Bagan ===
He made his debut for Mohun Bagan A.C. during Calcutta Football League 2015 (also known as KFL or Kolkata Football League). He got his first goal wearing Mohun Bagan's jersey against Kalighat M.S. Mallick's 13th-minute strike for Mohun Bagan against East Bengal during the 2018-19 I-League season Kolkata Derby created a history for him.

=== Mohammedan ===
On 8 February 2021, Mallick was roped in by Mohammedan along with Nigerian striker John Chidi. On 14 January 2021, he made his debut for the club, against Indian Arrows in a 1–0 loss, coming on as an 85th-minute substitute.

He scored his first goal for the club, on 10 March 2021, against RoundGlass Punjab, in a thrilling 3–3 draw.

== Career statistics ==
=== Club ===
As of 22 December 2022

Club	Season	League			Cup		AFC		Other		Total	
Club	Season	Division	Apps	Goals	Apps	Goals	Apps	Goals	Apps	Goals	Apps	Goals
Mohun Bagan	2015–16	I-League	6	1	1 (Note: Appearance(s) in Federation Cup)	0	–		5 (Note: Appearance(s) in Calcutta Football League)	1	12	2
Mohun Bagan	2016–17	I-League	5	1	0	0	6 (Note: Appearance(s) in AFC Cup)	0	–		11	1
Mohun Bagan	2017–18	I-League	10	0	0	0	–		–		10	0
Mohun Bagan	2018–19	I-League	10	2	0	0	–		–		10	2
Mohun Bagan	Mohun Bagan total		31	4	1	0	6	0	5	1	43	5
Bengaluru United	2020	I-League 2nd Division	4	0	0	0	–		–		4	0
Mohammedan	2020–21	I-League	7	1	0	0	–		–		7	1
Mohammedan	2021–22	I-League	12	2	6 (Note: Appearance(s) in Durand Cup)	3	–		–		18	5
Mohammedan	2022–23	I-League	2	0	3	0	–		–		5	0
Mohammedan	Mohammedan total		21	3	9	3	0	0	0	0	30	6
Delhi	2023–24	I-League	0	0	0	0	–		–		0	0
Career total			56	7	10	3	6	0	5	1	77	11

== Honours ==
Mohun Bagan

- Calcutta Football League: 2018–19

Mohammedan Sporting

- I-League: 2021–22
