= Leander D'Cunha =

Indian footballer (born 1997)

Personal information
- Date of birth: 25 October 1997 (age 29)
- Place of birth: Cuncolim, Goa, India
- Height: 1.77 m (5 ft 10 in)
- Position: Right-back

Youth career
- 2012–2014: Sesa Football Academy
- 2015–2017: Churchill Brothers

Senior career*
Years	Team	Apps	(Gls)
2017–2020	Goa B	23	(0)
2020–2024	Goa	25	(1)
2024–2025	Hyderabad	10	(0)
- * Club domestic league appearances and goals as of 22:00, 6 March 2025 (UTC)

Leander D'Cunha (born 25 October 1997) is an Indian professional footballer who plays as a defender.

== Career ==
=== Youth ===
Born in Cuncolim, Leander began playing football in intervillage tournaments in different age groups. Leander then joined Sesa in 2012 and remained there for two years until 2014. He then joined Churchill Brothers till 2017. He represented Goa football team in its 2017 run at the Santosh Trophy.

=== Goa ===
In 2017, Leander joined Goa B and captained it during the 2019 season. On 15 June 2020, he signed a three-year contract extension with Goa, keeping him at the club until 2023, earning promotion to the first team for 2020–21 season.

On 5 March 2021, Leander made his debut professional appearance for the club in the second leg of the 2021 Indian Super League playoffs against Mumbai City. He came on as 34th-minute substitute for injured Seriton Fernandes as the game ended on 2–2 draw. He made his first continental appearance for the club on 23 April in 2021 AFC Champions League group stage match against Persepolis.

== Career statistics ==
=== Club ===
As of 6 March 2022

Club	Season	League			Cup		AFC		Total	
Club	Season	Division	Apps	Goals	Apps	Goals	Apps	Goals	Apps	Goals
Goa B	2017–18	I-League 2nd Division	8	0	0	0	–		8	0
Goa B	2018–19	I-League 2nd Division	8	0	0	0	–		8	0
Goa B	2019–20	I-League 2nd Division	7	0	3 (Note: Appearance(s) in Durand Cup)	0	–		10	0
Goa	2020–21	Indian Super League	1	0	0	0	1 (Note: Appearance(s) in AFC Champions League)	0	2	0
Goa	2021–22	Indian Super League	9	0	5	1	–		14	1
Career total			33	0	8	1	1	0	42	1

== Honours ==
Goa

- Durand Cup: 2021
