= Zothanmawia =

Indian footballer

Personal information
- Full name: Zothanmawia Pachuau
- Date of birth: 6 September 1997 (age 29)
- Place of birth: Aizawl, Mizoram, India
- Height: 1.75 m (5 ft 9 in)
- Position: Goalkeeper

Team information
- Current team: Chanmari FC
- Number: 21

Youth career
- Chandigarh Football Academy
- 2012–2013: Dinthar

Senior career*
Years	Team	Apps	(Gls)
2015–2017	Aizawl	5	(0)
2018–2019	Chhinga Veng	16	(0)
2019–2020	Chanmari	18	(0)
2020–2021	Aizawl	13	(0)
2021–2023	Mohammedan	26	(0)
2023	Gokulam Kerala		
2023–	Chanmari	24	(0)
- * Club domestic league appearances and goals

Zothanmawia Pachuau (born 6 September 1997) is an Indian professional footballer who currently plays as a goalkeeper for Chanmari.

== Club career ==
Born in Aizawl, Mizoram, Zothanmawia started his career with the Chandigarh Football Academy. In 2011, after helping the academy win the 56th National School Games at the under-14 level, Zothanmawia was named as the best goalkeeper in the tournament. He was then a part of the Chandigarh U16 side that participated in the Mir Iqbal Hussain Trophy in 2012. After guiding Chandigarh U16 to the final against Assam, Zothanmawia could not prevent his side from defeat as Chandigarh lost 2–0 at the Fatorda Stadium.

In 2012, Zothanmawia returned to Mizoram to join Dinthar Football Club in the Mizoram Premier League. He played for the senior side for two seasons.

=== Aizawl ===
In 2014, after spending two years with Dinthar, Zothanmawia signed for Aizawl for the I-League 2nd Division season. He contributed to the club during their 2015 season in which Aizawl earned promotion to the I-League, keeping a clean-sheet against Chanmari. After earning promotion, Zothanmawia was named into the squad for the 2015 Mizoram Premier League season.

On 9 January 2016, Zothanmawia was selected to the team for the club's first I-League match against Mohun Bagan. He remained on the bench throughout the match as Aizawl lost 3–1. Zothanmawia then made his professional debut for the club on 22 January 2016 against DSK Shivajians. He kept a clean-sheet as Aizawl won their first match in the I-League 2–0.

== International career ==
In 2011, Zothanmawia was invited to attend a camp for the India U16 side. However, he did not appear for the team.

== Career statistics ==
=== Club ===
As of 25 August 2023

Club	Season	League			Cup		AFC		Total	
Club	Season	Division	Apps	Goals	Apps	Goals	Apps	Goals	Apps	Goals
Aizawl	2015–16	I-League	5	0	0	0	—		5	0
Aizawl	2016–17	I-League	0	0	0	0	—		0	0
Aizawl	Aizawl total		5	0	0	0	0	0	5	0
Chhinga Veng	2018–19	I-League 2nd Division	16	0	0	0	—		16	0
Aizawl	2019–20	I-League	7	0	0	0	—		7	0
Aizawl	2020–21	I-League	6	0	0	0	—		6	0
Aizawl	Aizawl total		13	0	0	0	0	0	13	0
Mohammedan	2021–22	I-League	16	0	5 (Note: Appearance(s) in Durand Cup)	0	—		21	0
Mohammedan	2022–23	I-League	10	0	3	0	—		13	0
Mohammedan	Mohammedan total		26	0	8	0	0	0	34	0
Gokulam Kerala	2023–24	I-League	0	0	3	0	—		3	0
Career total			60	0	11	0	0	0	71	0

== Honours ==
Mohammedan Sporting

- I-League: 2021–22
