= Devendra Murgaonkar =

Indian footballer

Devendra Murgaokar
Personal information
- Full name: Devendra Dhaku Murgaokar
- Date of birth: 2 November 1998 (age 28)
- Place of birth: Panaji, Goa
- Height: 1.67 m (5 ft 5 1/2 in)
- Positions: Striker; winger

Team information
- Current team: Jamshedpur
- Number: 7

Youth career
- Salgaocar

Senior career*
| Years | Team | Apps | (Gls) |
| 2017–2020 | Salgaocar | 54 | (47) |
| 2020–2024 | Goa | 46 | (3) |
| 2024–2026 | SC Delhi | 28 | (1) |
| 2026– | Jamshedpur | 0 | (0) |
- * Club domestic league appearances and goals as of 23:41, 21 May 2026 (UTC)

Devendra Dhaku Murgaokar (born 2 November 1998) is an Indian professional footballer who plays as a forward for the Indian Super League club Jamshedpur.

== Career ==
=== Youth and early career ===
Born in Panaji, Devendra began his football career with Salgaocar SC. During the 2017–18 Goa Professional League season Devandra made his debut for Salgaocar in the Goa Professional League. Devendra scored 20 goals for Salgaocar during the 2018–19 Goa Professional League season and also was named as the league top scorer for that season. During the 2019–20 Goa Professional League he scored 9 goals for the club.

=== FC Goa ===
On 1 October 2020, Devendra joined the Indian Super League's FC Goa on a three-year contract, after his previous team, Salgaocar SC, was paid an undisclosed transfer fee. On 11 December 2020, Devendra made his professional debut for FC Goa against Jamshedpur. He came on as a 58th-minute substitute for Alexander Romario with Goa winning the match 2–1. On 6 January 2021, Devendra scored his first goal in the Indian Super League as well as for Goa in the 81st minute against East Bengal, taking the game to a 1–1 draw. He made his debut in the AFC Champions League on 14 April 2021, against Al-Rayyan SC after coming in as substitute for Ishan Pandita.

Devendra scored his second goal for the club on 11 December 2021, against Bengaluru FC in their 2–1 win. He scored his third goal on 19 February 2022, against Hyderabad in their 3–2 defeat.

== Career statistics ==
=== Club ===
As of 17 August 2024

| Club | Season | League | | | Cup | | AFC | | Total | |
| Club | Season | Division | Apps | Goals | Apps | Goals | Apps | Goals | Apps | Goals |
|---|---|---|---|---|---|---|---|---|---|---|
| Goa | 2020–21 | Indian Super League | 13 | 1 | 0 | 0 | 5 (Note: Appearance(s) in AFC Champions League) | 0 | 18 | 1 |
| Goa | 2021–22 | Indian Super League | 19 | 2 | 6 (Note: Appearance(s) in Durand Cup) | 5 | – | | 25 | 7 |
| Goa | 2022–23 | Indian Super League | 12 | 0 | 3 (Note: Appearance(s) in Super Cup) | 0 | – | | 15 | 0 |
| Goa | 2023–24 | Indian Super League | 2 | 0 | 3 | 1 | – | | 5 | 1 |
| Goa | 2024–25 | Indian Super League | 0 | 0 | 3 | 2 | – | | 3 | 2 |
| Goa | Total | | 46 | 3 | 15 | 8 | 5 | 0 | 66 | 11 |
| Hyderabad | 2024–25 | Indian Super League | 0 | 0 | 0 | 0 | – | | 0 | 0 |
| Career total | | | 44 | 3 | 11 | 6 | 5 | 0 | 60 | 9 |

== Honours ==
Salgaocar

- AWES Cup runner-up: 2018

Goa

- ISL League Winners Shield: 2019–20
- Durand Cup: 2021

Individual

- Durand Cup Top Scorer: 2021
