= 2025–26 Bengaluru FC season =

13th season in the existence of Bengaluru FC

Bengaluru FC
2025–26 season
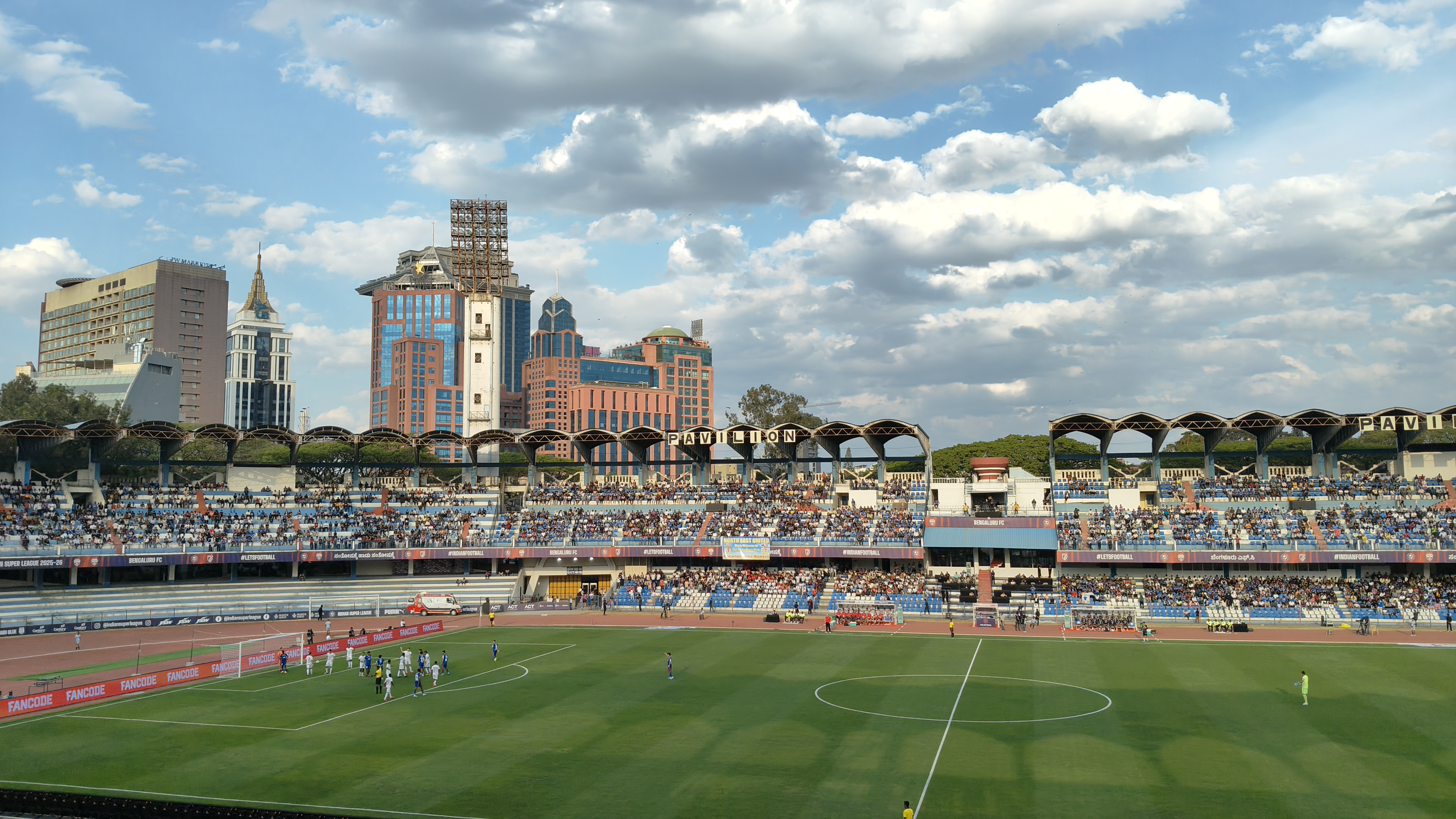
- Sree Kanteerava Stadium on an ISL matchday against NorthEast United.
- Chairman: Sajjan Jindal
- Manager: Pep Muñoz
- Stadium: Sree Kanteerava Stadium
- Indian Super League: 4th
- Super Cup: Group stage
- Durand Cup: Did not participate
- Top goalscorer: League: Braian Sánchez and Ryan Williams (4 goals each); All: Ryan Williams (6 goals)
- Highest home attendance: 21,714
- Lowest home attendance: 9,614
- Average home league attendance: 15,378
- Biggest win: 4–0 vs Gokulam Kerala
- Biggest defeat: 0–2 vs Punjab FC
Home colours	Away colours	Third colours
- All statistics correct as of 21 May 2026.

The 2025–26 season was Bengaluru FC's 13th season as a professional football club since its establishment in 2013 and 8th season in the Indian Super League. It ran from 1 June 2025 to 31 May 2026 with participation in the Indian Super League and Super Cup.

Owing to the major administrative and financial crisis in Indian football that arose from a dispute between All India Football Federation (AIFF) and Football Sports Development Limited (FSDL), Bengaluru did not participate in the 2025 Durand Cup. The crisis further pushed the club to halting their pre-season activities, temporary suspension of first team players and staff in August 2025.

The Blues eventually resumed operations later in the year when a resolution was reached to start the Indian football season in late 2025 with participation in the 2025–26 AIFF Super Cup, where they finished second in the Group stage, missing out on knockout stage after going down to Punjab FC in a penalty shootout played to decide the Group's winner.

On 14 November 2025, head coach Gerard Zaragoza parted ways with the club. He was replaced by former India international Renedy Singh, who was appointed as the full-time head coach on 21 January 2026 to lead the team into the upcoming ISL season. To ensure the club's survival amid the ongoing financial crisis in Indian football, senior players including captain Sunil Chhetri agreed to significant pay cuts in February 2026. This "sacrifice" allowed the club to navigate a season with limited matchday revenue and a truncated league format.

In the truncated ISL season, Bengaluru began brightly with only five points dropped in the first half of the season. They were in a serious contention for the title until Kerala Blasters FC led by Ashley Westwood, the former coach of Bengaluru in their inaugural season, handed a 1–2 defeat. This was also the first time Bengaluru had lost to Kerala Blasters at home. It triggered a string of three draws sliding the Blues down to fourth on the table at the end of the season.

== Background ==
After a disappointing campaign in the 2023–24 season, positive changes in the squad led the Blues to a significantly stronger 2024–25 season. Their resurgence saw them reach semi-finals in the Durand Cup, secure a third-place finish in the Super League standings and ultimately finish as runners-up in the Super League play-offs. However, they eventually fell short of any silverware after an early exit in the Super Cup in the round-of-16.

Owing to uncertainty in the future of Super League and administrative crisis in Indian football, the club cleared out high-earning foreign players and some veteran domestic names to rebuild under a "leaner" model to enable them to navigate the crisis. The club began its transfer window in June by signing extensions.

Forward Shivaldo Singh penned a new three-year deal that extended his contract until the end of 2027–28 season. Following his suite were Monirul Molla and Sahil Poonia who signed extensions for the same period. Among foreign players, Spaniard Édgar Méndez had signed a one-year extension, however, the crisis led uncertain future of the league meant the club parting ways the player in August. On 4 August 2025, Bengaluru had put out a statement on the suspension of first team players' and staff's salaries, before reinstating on 13th September.

In October, Moroccan defender Salaheddine Bahi was announced as the first signing of the season. Two days later, Ashique Kuruniyan who had left for Mohun Bagan Super Giant in 2022, was announced to rejoin the Blues in a long-term deal of four years. To strengthen the midfield after the departure of Alberto Noguera, Bengaluru announced the addition of Braian Sanchez.

2024–25 I-League Golden Glove winner Jaspreet Singh was also announced as a new addition to the squad's goalkeeping prowess. To further reduce the vacuum created in the midfield with departures of key players, Bengaluru added Uzbeki midfielder Sirojiddin Kuziev. Lastly, Ryan Williams was also handed an extension shunning the rumours which hinted at a move to Mohun Bagan. Halicharan Narzary was the only player to be loaned out to Diamond Harbour FC for an unknown period on 27 July 2025.

On 5 June 2025, the club published its sustainability report of 2024–25 season where it recycled 2,454 kg (5,410 lb) of waste and thus avoided 5,934 kg (13,082 lb) CO_{2} emissions. Former Bengaluru FC players Rino Anto and Shankar Sampingiraj decided to call an end to their careers, on the occasion the club wished them the best. On 20 July 2025, the club and its supporters celebrated the 12th anniversary of the club's foundation.

=== Transfers in ===
No.	Position	Player	Previous club	Date	Fee	Ref
21	DF	(Morocco) Salaheddine Bahi ‡	(Morocco) Hassania Agadir	1 October 2025	Free	
13	GK	(India) Jaspreet Singh	(India) Namdhari FC	9 October 2025	Free	
10	MF	(Argentina) Braian Sanchez	(Argentina) Deportivo Riestra	7 October 2025	Loan	
22	FW	(India) Ashique Kuruniyan	(India) Mohun Bagan Super Giant	3 October 2025	Free	
6	MF	(Uzbekistan) Sirojiddin Kuziev	Without a club	13 October 2025	Free	
Total transfers in				5		

‡ Left in January transfer window.

=== Promoted from youth system ===
No.	Position	Player	Previous club	Promotion	Fee	Ref
	GK	(India) Aheibam Suraj Singh	(India) Bengaluru B	1 February 2026	Internal transfer (Youth system)	
26	DF	(India) Harsh Palande	(India) Bengaluru B	1 February 2026	Internal transfer (Youth system)	
18	DF	(India) Haobam Ricky Meetei	(India) Bengaluru B	1 February 2026	Internal transfer (Youth system)	
66	DF	(India) Takhellambam Bungson Singh	(India) Bengaluru B	1 February 2026	Internal transfer (Youth system)	
38	MF	(India) Ningthoukhongjam Rishi Singh	(India) Bengaluru B	1 February 2026	Internal transfer (Youth system)	
	MF	(India) Mohammed Arbash	(India) Bengaluru B	1 February 2026	Internal transfer (Youth system)	
9	FW	(India) Wornilen Serto Kom	(India) Bengaluru B	1 February 2026	Internal transfer (Youth system)	
Total promotions				6		

=== Transfers out ===
No.	Position	Player	Outgoing club	Date	Fee	Ref
17	FW	(Spain) Edgar Mendez	(Thailand) PT Prachuap F.C.	June 2025	Free	
30	FW	(Argentina) Jorge Pereyra Díaz	(India) Mumbai City FC	June 2025	Free	
10	MF	(Spain) Alberto Noguera	(India) Chennaiyin FC	28 January 2026	Free	
6	MF	(India) Harsh Patre	(India) FC Goa	17 July 2025	Free	
6	MF	(India) Rohit Danu	(India) Inter Kashi FC	31 January 2026	Free	
2	DF	(Australia) (Serbia) Aleksander Jovanovic	Retired	31 May 2025	Free	
18	MF	(Spain) Pedro Capo	(Spain) CF Talavera de la Reina	June 2025	Free	
21	DF	(Morocco) Salaheddine Bahi	(Morocco) RCA Zemamra	January 2026	Free	
Total transfers out				8		

=== Loans out ===
No.	Position	Player	Outgoing club	Date	Fee	Duration	Ref
19	FW	(India) Halicharan Narzary	(India) Diamond Harbour FC	27 July 2025	Undisclosed	One season	

== Overview ==
=== Competitions ===
Competition	First match	Last match	Starting round	Final position	Record							
Competition	First match	Last match	Starting round	Final position	Pld	W	D	L	GF	GA	GD	Win %
Super League	15 February 2026	16 May 2026	Matchday 1	TBD	13	6	5	2	18	12	+6	46.15
Super Cup	30 October 2026	05 November 2026	Group stage	Group stage	3	2	1	0	6	0	+6	66.67
Total					16	8	6	2	24	12	+12	50.00

Last updated: 16 May 2026
Source: Competitions

=== Personnel ===
Role	Name	Refs.
Head coach	(Spain) Pep Muñoz	
Assistant coach	TBA	
Goalkeeping coach	(India) Muhammed Rashid Nalakath	
Strength and conditioning coach	Vacant	
Team analyst	(India) Prateek Chopra	
Reserves coach	(India) Renedy Singh	
Academy head coach	(India) Sandesh Bhoite	
Head Physio	(India) Naved Hameed	
Assistant physio	(India) Sanket Thakar	
Masseur	Vacant	
Total staff	7	

=== Players under contract ===
No.	Name	Nationality	Position	Date of Birth (Age)	Since	Until	Picked for	
No.	Name	Nationality	Position	Date of Birth (Age)	Since	Until	SC	ISL
Goalkeepers
1	Gurpreet Singh Sandhu	(India)	GK	3 February 1992 (aged 33)	2017	2028	Yes	Yes
13	Jaspreet Singh	(India)	GK	27 February 1999 (aged 26)	2025		No	Yes
28	Lalthuammawia Ralte	(India)	GK	28 November 1992 (aged 32)	2024	2025	Yes	Yes
30	Sahil Poonia	(India)	GK	8 March 2006 (aged 19)	2023	2026	Yes	Yes
	Aheibam Suraj Singh	(India)	GK	18 February 2008 (aged 17)	2025	2028	No	Yes
Defenders
2	Rahul Bheke	(India)	RB	6 December 1996 (aged 28)	2024	2026	Yes	Yes
4	Chinglensana Singh	(India)	CB	23 July 1996 (aged 28)	2024	2029	Yes	Yes
12	Mohamed Salah	(India)	RB	7 November 1994 (aged 30)	2024	2025	No	Yes
18	Haobam Ricky Meetei	(India)	RB	30 August 2006 (aged 18)	2025	2027	No	Yes
21	Salaheddine Bahi ‡	(Morocco)	CB	1 October 1994 (aged 30)	2025	2026	Yes	—N/a
25	Namgyal Bhutia	(India)	RB	11 August 1999 (aged 25)	2020	2026	Yes	Yes
26	Harsh Palande	(India)	CB	26 January 2005 (aged 20)	2025	2029	No	Yes
27	Nikhil Poojary	(India)	RB	3 September 1995 (aged 29)	2024	2028	Yes	Yes
32	Roshan Singh	(India)	LB	2 February 1999 (aged 26)	2020	2029	Yes	Yes
66	Takhellambam Bungson Singh	(India)	CB	5 March 2007 (aged 18)	2025	2028	No	Yes
Midfielders
6	Sirojiddin Kuziev	(Uzbekistan)	CM	1 September 1996 (aged 28)	2025		Yes	Yes
8	Suresh Singh	(India)	DM	7 August 2000 (aged 24)	2019	2028	Yes	Yes
10	Braian Sánchez	(Argentina)	DM	11 June 1993 (aged 31)	2025		Yes	Yes
14	Soham Varshneya	(India)	MF	14 August 2004 (aged 20)	2024	2027	No	Yes
23	Lalremtluanga Fanai	(India)	DM	17 September 2004 (aged 20)	2020	2028	Yes	Yes
31	Vinith Venkatesh	(India)	CM	31 July 2005 (aged 19)	2022	2028	Yes	Yes
38	Ningthoukhongjam Rishi Singh	(India)	MF	23 March 2008 (aged 17)	2025		No	Yes
51	Shivaldo Singh	(India)	RM	13 June 2004 (aged 20)	2023	2026	Yes	Yes
	Mohammed Arbash	(India)	CM	29 September 2008 (aged 16)	2025	2027	No	Yes
Forwards
7	Ryan Williams	(India)	RW	28 October 1993 (aged 31)	2023		Yes	Yes
9	Serto Worneilen Kom	(India)	CF	25 March 2004 (aged 21)	2025		No	Yes
11	Sunil Chhetri	(India)	CF	3 August 1984 (aged 40)	2013	2026	Yes	Yes
17	Monirul Molla	(India)	CF	1 May 2005 (aged 20)	2023	2026	Yes	Yes
19	Halicharan Narzary†	(India)	LW	10 May 1994 (aged 31)	2023	2026	—N/a	—N/a
22	Ashique Kuruniyan	(India)	LW	14 June 1997 (aged 27)	2025	2029	Yes	Yes
37	Kelvin Singh Taorem	(India)	FW	22 November 2005 (aged 19)	2024		Yes	Yes
39	Sivasakthi Narayanan	(India)	CF	9 July 2001 (aged 23)	2021		Yes	Yes

^{†} Loaned out.
^{‡} Left in January transfer window

== Pre-season ==
Despite the crisis, the club began its pre-season in September. The team's Masseur, Manu Prasad, who was part of the staff since 2017–18 season left the club to his hometown for personal reasons. The Blues had to continue without Prasad, who was referred to as a beloved member of the squad and his hands as "God's gifted" by Sunil Chhetri himself. On 17 September, the Blues arrived in Bengaluru to begin their pre-season training campaign at the newly constructed and India's first hybrid training pitch, located in Yelahanka.

On 2 October 2025, sprinter Usain Bolt joined the club owner Parth Jindal along with some of the first team players in a five-a-side friendly against Mumbai City, organised by Puma. Amidst uncertainty of the league's resumption, Bengaluru FC did not host their traditional pre-season open training session.

=== Friendlies ===
29 September 2025 Friendly	Bengaluru	0–0	Malappuram FC
10:00 IST		Report

9 February 2026 Friendly	Bengaluru	0–0	Sreenidi Deccan
10:00 IST		Report

== Super Cup ==
=== Group C ===
Pos	Team	Pld	W	D	L	GF	GA	GD	Pts	Qualification	PFC	BFC	GOK	MDS
1	Punjab	3	2	1	0	6	0	+6	7 (Note: Punjab qualified after winning the penalty shoot-out.)	Advance to knockout stage		0–0	3–0	3–0
2	Bengaluru	3	2	1	0	6	0	+6	7				4–0	2–0
3	Gokulam Kerala	3	1	0	2	3	7	−4	3					3–0
4	Mohammedan	3	0	0	3	0	8	−8	0					

Source: AIFF
Legend: Blue = home team win; Yellow = draw; Red = away team win.
Rules for classification: 1) points; 2) head-to-head points; 3) head-to-head goal difference; 4) goal difference; 5) number of goals scored; 6) Penalty shoot-out if only two teams are tied and they met in the last round of the group; 7) Disciplinary points; 8) drawing of lots
Notes:

30 October 2025 Group stage	Bengaluru	2–0	Mohammedan	Fatorda
19:30 IST	Taorem 34'; Chhetri 86' (pen.)	I-League; PDF Report		Stadium: Fatorda Stadium; Attendance: 232; Referee: Venkatesh Ramachandran; Man of the Match: Taorem Kelvin Singh (Bengaluru)

2 November 2025 Group stage	Gokulam Kerala	0–4	Bengaluru	Fatorda
19:30 IST		I-League; PDF Report	Williams 7', 47'; Vinith 44'; Chhetri 62'	Stadium: Fatorda Stadium; Attendance: 350; Referee: Aditya Purkayastha; Man of the Match: Ryan Williams (Bengaluru)

5 November 2025 Group stage	Bengaluru	0–0 (4–5 p)	Punjab	Fatorda
19:30 IST		I-League; PDF Report		Stadium: Fatorda Stadium; Attendance: 100; Referee: Ashwin; Man of the Match: Muheet Shabir (Punjab)
	Penalties
	Wangjam (penalty scored); Bheke (penalty scored); Williams (penalty missed); Chhetri (penalty scored); Sánchez (penalty scored)		(penalty scored) Nsungusi; (penalty scored) Rebello; (penalty scored) Zeljković; (penalty scored) L.Augustine; (penalty scored) V. Rai

== Super League ==
=== Summary ===
Pos	Team	Pld	W	D	L	GF	GA	GD	Pts
2	Mohun Bagan	13	7	5	1	23	9	+14	26
3	Mumbai City	13	7	4	2	17	9	+8	25
4	Bengaluru	13	6	5	2	18	12	+6	23
5	Jamshedpur	13	6	4	3	15	10	+5	22 (Note: Head-to-head points: Jamshedpur 3, Punjab 0.)
6	Punjab	13	6	4	3	18	12	+6	22

Source: Indian Super League
Rules for classification: 1) points; 2) goal difference; 3) number of goals scored; 4) head-to-head points; 5) head-to-head goal difference; 6) head-to-head goals scored; 7) fair play ranking; 8) drawing of lots.
(Note: Head-to-head record is used only after all the matches between the teams in question have been played).

==== Result summary ====
Overall								Home						Away					
Pld	W	D	L	GF	GA	GD	Pts	W	D	L	GF	GA	GD	W	D	L	GF	GA	GD
13	6	5	2	18	12	+6	23	1	3	2	4	5	−1	5	2	0	14	7	+7

==== Results by round ====
Matchday	1	2	3	4	5	6	7	8	9	10	11	12	13
Ground	H	H	H	A	H	A	A	H	A	H	A	A	A
Result	W	D	L	W	D	W	W	L	D	D	D	W	W
Position	3	5	7	6	6	5	3	5	5	6	6	4	4

Updated to match(es) played on 16 May 2026. Source: soccerway
A = Away; H = Home; W = Win; D = Draw; L = Loss; = League premiers, qualification to
2026–27 ACL2 Playoffs; = Relegation to 2026–27 IFL

=== League matches ===
15 February 2026 1	Bengaluru	2–0	SC Delhi	Bengaluru, Karnataka
19:30 IST	Narayanan 45+1'; Fanai (yellow card) 73'; Rishi (yellow card) 87'; Chhetri 90+2'	Report	(yellow card) 47' Ribeiro; (yellow card) 90+5' Fernandes	Stadium: Sree Kanteerava Stadium; Attendance: 12,377; Referee: Ashwin Kumar; Man of the Match: Nikhil Poojary

22 February 2026 2	Bengaluru	1–1	NorthEast United	Bengaluru, Karnataka
17:00 IST	Sánchez 19'; Naorem (yellow card) 80'	Report	(yellow card) 37' Gogoi; (yellow card) 56' Nickson; 68' Lalbiaknia	Stadium: Sree Kanteerava Stadium; Attendance: 13,623; Referee: Nathan S. Senthil; Man of the Match: Lalrinzuala Lalbiaknia (NorthEast United)

27 February 2026 3	Bengaluru	0–2	Punjab	Bengaluru, Karnataka
17:00 IST	Williams (yellow card) 53'; Naorem (yellow card) 90'	Report	20', 32' Nsungusi; (yellow card) 72' Shabong; (yellow card) 79' Zeljković	Stadium: Sree Kanteerava Stadium; Attendance: 9,614; Referee: R. Venkatesh; Man of the Match: Effiong Nsungusi (Punjab)

7 March 2026 4	Mohammedan	1–2	Bengaluru	Kolkata, West Bengal
17:00 IST	Mahitosh 51'; Bora (yellow card) 88'		22' (yellow card) 62' Williams; 41' Kuruniyan; (yellow card) 50' Kuziev; (yellow card) 74' Konsham	Stadium: Kishore Bharati Krirangan; Man of the Match: Ryan Williams

14 March 2026 5	Bengaluru	0–0	Mohun Bagan	Bengaluru, Karnataka
19:30 IST	Sánchez (yellow card) 60'	Report	(yellow card) 86' Ralte	Stadium: Sree Kanteerava Stadium; Attendance: 20,214; Referee: Lakshay; Man of the Match: Subhasish Bose (Mohun Bagan)

22 March 2026 6	Inter Kashi	1–3	Bengaluru	Kolkata, West Bengal
19:30 IST	Planas 38'; Karuthadathkuni (yellow card) 68'; N. Kumar (yellow card) 87'	Report	(yellow card) 8' Fanai; 20' Kuruniyan; 69', 90+8' Sánchez; (yellow card) 87' Molla	Stadium: Kishore Bharati Krirangan; Attendance: 65; Man of the Match: Ashique Kuruniyan

4 April 2026 7	FC Goa	0–2	Bengaluru	Margao, Goa
19:30 IST	Moreno (yellow card) 82'	Report	3' Chhetri; (yellow card) 90' Haobam; (yellow card) 90+2' Sandhu; 90+2' Bhutia	Stadium: Fatorda Stadium; Attendance: 2,532; Referee: Senthil Nathan; Man of the Match: Namgyal Bhutia

11 April 2026 8	Bengaluru	1–2	Kerala Blasters	Bengaluru, Karnataka
19:30 IST	Ndiaye 27' (o.g.); Sánchez (red card) (Note: Was later converted to a yellow after an appeal by Bengaluru FC.)	Report	(yellow card) 11' Saheef; (yellow card) 35' Hernández; 60' Bertomeu; 78' (yellow card) 84' Franchu	Stadium: Sree Kanteerava Stadium; Attendance: 21,714; Referee: Pratik Mondal; Man of the Match: Ebindas Yesudasan (Kerala Blasters)

16 April 2026 9	East Bengal	3–3	Bengaluru	Kolkata, West Bengal
19:30 IST	Sibille (yellow card) 16'; Chakrabarti (yellow card) 18'; Ali 21'; Lalrindika (yellow card) 23'; Figueira (red card); Crespo 55'; Søjberg 90+6' (yellow card) 90+7'	Report	(yellow card) 6' Bheke; 12' Kuruniyan; (yellow card) 36' Naorem; 39' Wangjam; (yellow card) 45' (goal) 71' Williams; (yellow card) 86' Varshneya	Stadium: Kishore Bharati Krirangan; Attendance: 19,989; Referee: Ashwin Kumar; Man of the Match: Saúl Crespo (East Bengal)

25 April 2026 10	Bengaluru	0–0	Mumbai City	Bengaluru, Karnataka
17:00 IST		Report	(yellow card) 90+1' Bawitlung	Stadium: Sree Kanteerava Stadium; Attendance: 14,723; Referee: Aditya Purkayastha; Man of the Match: Chinglensana Singh Konsham

4 May 2026 11	Odisha	1–1	Bengaluru	Bhubaneswar, Odisha
19:30 IST	Ali 34'; Vanlalruatfela (yellow card) 46'; Chhakchhuak (yellow card) 57'; Beyong (yellow card) 67'	Report	48' (pen.) Sánchez; (yellow card) 90+2' Venkatesh	Stadium: Kalinga Stadium; Attendance: 217; Referee: Ajay Krishnan; Man of the Match: Braian Sánchez

9 May 2026 12	Jamshedpur	0–1	Bengaluru	Jamshedpur, Jharkhand
19:30 IST		Report	(yellow card) 29' Konsham; 38' Williams; (yellow card) 45' Naorem; (yellow card) 90+8' Venkatesh; (yellow card) 90+9' Chhetri	Stadium: JRD Tata Sports Complex; Attendance: 8,032; Referee: Ramachandran Venkatesh; Man of the Match: Ryan Williams

16 May 2026 13	Chennaiyin	1–2	Bengaluru	Chennai, Tamil Nadu
TBC IST	Chukwu 34'; Mukherjee (yellow card) 80'; Hnamte (yellow card) 83'	Report	43' Williams; 89' Kom; (yellow card) 90+6' Bheke	Stadium: Marina Arena; Attendance: 4,137; Referee: Surojit Das; Man of the Match: Ryan Williams

== Accolades ==
On 30 October 2025, Gurpreet Singh Sandhu became the third player after Sunil Chhetri and Udanta Singh to make 200th appearance for Bengaluru. It came against Mohammedan SC at the Super Cup where he managed to keep a clean-sheet throughout the three games played at the tournament. On 15 February 2026, at 41 years and 196 days, Sunil Chhetri became the oldest goalscorer in the Indian Super League's history, overtaking Robert Pires who scored for FC Goa during the 2014 season, aged 42 years and 15 days.

=== Player of the match awards ===
Rank	Player	ISL	SC	Total
1	(India) Ryan Williams	3	1	4
2	(India) Kelvin Singh	0	1	1
3	(India) Nikhil Poojary	1	0	1
3	(India) Ashique Kuruniyan	1	0	1
3	(India) Namgyal Bhutia	1	0	1
3	(India) Chinglensana Singh	1	0	1
3	(Argentina) Braian Sánchez	1	0	1
Totals		7	2	9

Updated: 10 May 2026

== Statistics ==
=== Appearances and goals ===
No.	Pos	Nat	Player	Total		ISL		Super Cup	
No.	Pos	Nat	Player	Apps	Goals	Apps	Goals	Apps	Goals
Goalkeepers
1	GK	(India) IND	Gurpreet Singh	16	0	13+0	0	3+0	0
13	GK	(India) IND	Jaspreet Singh	0	0	0+0	0	0+0	0
28	GK	(India) IND	Lalthuammawia Ralte	0	0	0+0	0	0+0	0
30	GK	(India) IND	Sahil Poonia	0	0	0+0	0	0+0	0
Defenders
2	RB	(India) IND	Rahul Bheke	14	0	11+0	0	3+0	0
4	CB	(India) IND	Chinglensana Singh	16	0	13+0	0	2+1	0
12	RB	(India) IND	Mohamed Salah	0	0	0+0	0	0+0	0
18	RB	(India) IND	Ricky Meitei	7	0	3+4	0	0+0	0
21	CB	(Morocco) MAR	Salaheddine Bahi	2	0	0+0	0	2+0	0
25	RB	(India) IND	Namgyal Bhutia	7	1	2+4	1	0+1	0
27	RB	(India) IND	Nikhil Poojary	13	0	10+0	0	3+0	0
32	LB	(India) IND	Roshan Singh	15	0	12+0	0	3+0	0
66	CB	(India) IND	Bungson Singh	2	0	2+0	0	0+0	0
Midfielders
6	CM	(Uzbekistan) UZB	Sirojiddin Kuziev	16	0	10+3	0	3+0	0
8	DM	(India) IND	Suresh Singh	15	1	8+4	1	3+0	0
10	DM	(Argentina) ARG	Braian Sánchez	16	4	13+0	4	3+0	0
14	MF	(India) IND	Soham Varshneya	8	0	1+7	0	0+0	0
23	DM	(India) IND	Lalremtluanga Fanai	14	0	10+3	0	1+0	0
31	CM	(India) IND	Vinith Venkatesh	13	1	0+10	0	2+1	1
38	MF	(India) IND	Rishi Singh	3	0	0+3	0	0+0	0
Forwards
7	RW	(India) IND	Ryan Williams	15	6	12+0	4	3+0	2
9	CF	(India) IND	Sivasakthi Narayanan	7	1	4+3	1	0+0	0
11	CF	(India) IND	Sunil Chhetri	16	4	8+5	2	0+3	2
17	CF	(India) IND	Monirul Molla	4	0	0+4	0	0+0	0
22	LW	(India) IND	Ashique Kuruniyan	13	3	10+0	3	0+3	0
29	FW	(India) IND	Serto Kom	1	1	0+1	1	0+0	0
37	FW	(India) IND	Kelvin Singh	5	1	0+2	0	3+0	1
51	RW	(India) IND	Shivaldo Singh	7	0	1+3	0	0+3	0

- Source: soccerway

Updated: 16 may 2026

=== Goal scorers ===
Rank	No.	Pos	Nat	Player	ISL	SC	Total
1	7	RW	(India)	Ryan Williams	4	2	6
2	11	CF	(India)	Sunil Chhetri	2	2	4
2	10	AM	(Argentina)	Braian Sánchez	4	0	4
4	22	LW	(India)	Ashique Kuruniyan	3	0	3
5	37	RW	(India)	Kelvin Singh	0	1	1
5	31	CM	(India)	Vinith Venkatesh	0	1	1
5	38	CF	(India)	Sivasakthi Narayanan	1	0	1
5	25	RB	(India)	Namgyal Bhutia	1	0	1
5	8	DM	(India)	Suresh Singh	1	0	1
5	29	CF	(India)	Serto Kom	1	0	1
Own goals					1	0	1
Totals					18	6	24

Updated: 16 May 2026

=== Clean sheets ===
Rank	No.	Pos	Nat	Player	ISL	SC	Total
1	1	GK	(India)	Gurpreet Singh Sandhu	4	3	7
Totals					4	3	7

Updated: 16 May 2026

=== Disciplinary record ===
Rank	No.	Pos	Nat	Player	ISL			SC			Total			Points	Notes
Rank	No.	Pos	Nat	Player	Yellow card	Second yellow card	Red card	Yellow card	Second yellow card	Red card	Yellow card	Second yellow card	Red card	Points	Notes
1	32	LB	(India)	Roshan Singh	4	0	0	0	0	0	4	0	0	4	Misses the final league game against Chennaiyin FC.
1	4	CB	(India)	Chinglensana Singh	2	0	0	2	0	0	4	0	0	4	—N/a
1	18	RB	(India)	Ricky Meetei	1	0	1	0	0	0	1	0	1	4	Suspended after a violent misconduct resulting in a red card against Chennaiyin.
4	10	AM	(Argentina)	Braian Sánchez	2	0	0	1	0	0	3	0	0	3	Red card against Kerala Blasters was revoked and converted to a yellow.
4	6	CM	(Uzbekistan)	Sirojiddin Kuziev	1	0	0	2	0	0	3	0	0	3	—N/a
4	23	DM	(India)	Lalremtluanga Fanai	2	0	0	1	0	0	3	0	0	3	—N/a
4	7	RW	(India)	Ryan Williams	3	0	0	0	0	0	3	0	0	3	—N/a
8	31	CM	(India)	Vinith Venkatesh	2	0	0	0	0	0	2	0	0	2	—N/a
8	2	RB	(India)	Rahul Bheke	2	0	0	0	0	0	2	0	0	2	—N/a
10	29	RW	(India)	Shivaldo Singh	0	0	0	1	0	0	1	0	0	1	—N/a
10	28	MF	(India)	Rishi Singh	1	0	0	0	0	0	1	0	0	1	—N/a
10	1	GK	(India)	Gurpreet Singh	1	0	0	0	0	0	1	0	0	1	—N/a
10	14	MF	(India)	Soham Varshneya	1	0	0	0	0	0	1	0	0	1	—N/a
10	11	CF	(India)	Sunil Chhetri	1	0	0	0	0	0	1	0	0	1	—N/a
Totals					23	0	0	7	0	0	30	0	0	30	—N/a

Disciplinary points: yellow card = 1 point, red card as a result of two yellow cards = 3 points, direct red card = 3 points, yellow card followed by direct red card = 4 points.
Updated: 16 May 2026

== See also ==
- List of Bengaluru FC seasons
- 2025–26 in Indian football
