= 2024–25 Bengaluru FC season =

12th season in the existence of Bengaluru FC

Bengaluru FC
2024–25 season
- Bengaluru FC vs Mumbai City, 29 March 2025.
- Chairman: (India) Sajjan Jindal
- Manager: (Spain) Gerard Zaragoza
- Stadium: Sree Kanteerava Stadium
- Indian Super League: Runner-up (League 3rd)
- Super Cup: Round of 16
- Durand Cup: Semifinalist
- Top goalscorer: League: (India) Sunil Chhetri (14 goals); All: (India) Sunil Chhetri (17 goals)
- Highest home attendance: 22,302
- Lowest home attendance: 7,367
- Average home league attendance: 12,685
- Biggest win: 5–0 vs Mumbai City
- Biggest defeat: 3–0 vs Goa
Home colours	Away colours	Third colours
- All statistics correct as of 12 April 2024.

The 2024–25 season is Bengaluru FC's 12th season as a professional football club since its establishment in 2013 and 7th season in the Indian Super League. It runs from 1 June 2024 to 31 May 2025 with participation in Durand Cup, Indian Super League and Super Cup.

The Blues revealed six new signings on 7 July 2024, during an open training session at the Bangalore Football Stadium. Following a week long training at Inspire Institute of Sport in Ballari, they reached Kolkata on 30 July 2024 for the Durand Cup.

In its fifth appearance at the Durand Cup, Bengaluru started brightly by securing wins in all of its three group stage matches before heading to the knockout stage. In the quarterfinals, a last minute goal by Pereyra Díaz against Kerala Blasters ensured a place in the semi-finals against Mohun Bagan. The campaign along with the winning run came to an end on 27th August after going down against Mohun Bagan in the penalties, despite taking an early 2–0 lead.

== Background ==
After finishing 10th in the league in its previous season, its lowest since finishing 7th in the 2020–21 season, and failing to perform in the cup tournaments, Bengaluru began making significant changes to its squad by parting ways with Oliver Drost, Slavko Damjanović and Javi Hernández.

Later during the open training session on 7 July, the club announced return of Rahul Bheke who had joined from Mumbai City FC as season's first signing. The Indian international full back was previously a part of the club during 2017–2021 period. Spaninard forward Édgar Méndez was later revealed as the season's first foreign signing. Joining him were Jorge Pereyra Díaz and Alberto Noguera, both from Mumbai City. Among domestic signings, Mohamed Salah from Punjab FC and Lalthuammawia Ralte, the returning goalkeeper from Odisha FC were revealed on the same day.

In the following week, the Dutch midfielder Keziah Veendorp parted ways with the club and replacing him on 16 June was the Spaniard Pedro Capó. In September, forward Salam Johnson Singh was loaned to SC Bengaluru, a local club that competes in I-League.

=== Transfers in ===
No.	Position	Player	Previous club	Date	Value at the time	Fee	Ref
12	DF	(India) Mohammeed Salah	(India) Punjab FC	7 July 2024	₹0.6 crore (US$64,000)	Free	
	GK	(India) Lalthuammawia Ralte	(India) Odisha FC	7 July 2024	₹0.2 crore (US$21,000)	Free	
	DF	(India) Rahul Bheke	(India) Mumbai City FC	7 July 2024	₹1.2 crore (US$130,000)	Free	
10	MF	(Spain) Alberto Noguera	(India) Mumbai City FC	7 July 2024	₹1 crore (US$110,000)	Free	
17	FW	(Spain) Edgar Mendez	(Mexico) Club Necaxa	7 July 2024	₹3.2 crore (US$340,000)	Free	
	FW	(Argentina) Jorge Pereyra Díaz	(India) Mumbai City FC	7 July 2024	₹2.6 crore (US$280,000)	Free	
	MF	(Spain) Pedro Capo	(Spain) CD Eldense	16 July 2024	₹0.6 crore (US$64,000)	Free	
Estimated spending based on the market values: ₹9.4 crore (US$1.0 million)

=== Transfers out ===
No.	Position	Player	Outgoing club	Date	Value at the time	Fee	Ref
30	GK	(India) Lara Sharma	(India) FC Goa	18 June 2024	₹0.6 crore (US$64,000)	₹30 lakh (US$32,000)	
10	MF	(Spain) Javi Hernández	(India) Jamshedpur FC	25 July 2024	₹3.6 crore (US$380,000)	Free	
21	FW	(Denmark) Oliver Drost	(Denmark) FC Helsingør	₹2 crore (US$210,000)	10 July 2024	Free	
23	DF	(Montenegro) Slavko Damjanovic	(Indonesia) Persebaya Surabaya	6 July 2024	₹1.6 crore (US$170,000)	Free	
18	MF	(India) Rohit Kumar	(India) Odisha FC	12 June 2024	₹1 crore (US$110,000)	Free	
	MF	(India) Jayesh Rane	(India) Mumbai City FC	21 June 2024	₹0.8 crore (US$85,000)	Free	
13	GK	(India) Amrit Gope	(India) Jamshedpur FC	27 June 2024	₹0.2 crore (US$21,000)	Free	
44	DF	(India) Robin Yadav	(India) NorthEast United FC	13 July 2024	₹0.2 crore (US$21,000)	Free	
6	MF	(Netherlands) Keziah Veendorp	Without a club	12 July 2024	₹3.6 crore (US$380,000)	Free	
16	DF	(India) Shankar Sampingiraj	(India) SC Bengaluru	1 June 2024	₹0.4 crore (US$43,000)	Free	
	DF	(India) Parag Shrivas	(India) Hyderabad FC	1 June 2024	₹0.4 crore (US$43,000)	Free	
	MF	(India) Ajay Chhetri	(India) Sreenidi Deccan FC	1 June 2024	₹0.6 crore (US$64,000)	Free	
Estimated offloading based on the market values: ₹14.7 crore (US$1.6 million)

=== Loans out ===
No.	Position	Player	Outgoing club	Date	Fee	Duration	Ref
35	FW	(India) Salam Johnson Singh	SC Bengaluru	11 September 2024	Undisclosed	One season	

== Overview ==
=== Competitions ===
Competition	First match	Last match	Starting round	Final position	Record							
Competition	First match	Last match	Starting round	Final position	Pld	W	D	L	GF	GA	GD	Win %
Super League	14 September 2024	11 March 2025	Matchday 1	Runners-up (League 3rd)	28	13	5	10	49	35	+14	46.43
Super Cup	23 April 2025	23 April 2025	Round of 16	Round of 16	1	0	1	0	1	1	+0	0.00
Durand Cup	31 July 2024	27 August 2024	Group Stage	Semifinalist	5	4	1	0	13	4	+9	80.00
Total					34	17	7	10	63	40	+23	50.00

Last updated: 12 April 2025
Source: Competitions

=== Personnel ===
Role	Name	Refs.
Head coach	(Spain) Gerard Zaragoza	
Assistant coach	(Argentina) Sebastián Vega	
Assistant coach	(India) Renedy Singh	
Goalkeeping coach	(Georgia (country)) Konstantine Gugunava	
Strength and conditioning coach	(Greece) Ioannis Gkiokas	
Team analyst	(India) Prateek Chopra	
Reserves coach	(India) Bibiano Fernandes	
Academy head coach	(India) Sandesh Bhoite	
Head Physio	(India) Naved Hameed	
Assistant physio	(India) John Daniel	
Masseur	(India) Manu Prasad	

=== Players under contract ===
No.	Name	Nationality	Position	Date of Birth (Age)	Since	Until	Picked for Durand Cup	Picked for ISL	Picked for Super Cup
Goalkeepers
1	Gurpreet Singh Sandhu	(India)	GK	3 February 1992 (aged 32)	2017	2028	Yes	Yes	Yes
22	Sahil Poonia	(India)	GK	8 March 2006 (aged 18)	2023	2026	Yes	Yes	Yes
28	Lalthuammawia Ralte	(India)	GK	28 November 1992 (aged 31)	2024	2025	Yes	Yes	Yes
Defenders
2	Rahul Bheke	(India)	RB	6 December 1996 (aged 27)	2024	2026	Yes	Yes	Yes
4	Chinglensana Singh	(India)	CB	23 July 1996 (aged 27)	2024	2029	Yes	Yes	Yes
5	Aleksandar Jovanović	(Australia) (Serbia)	CB	15 November 1997 (aged 26)	2022	2025	Yes	Yes	Yes
12	Mohamed Salah	(India)	RB	7 November 1994 (aged 29)	2024	2025	Yes	Yes	Yes
	Jessel Carneiro	(India)	LB	14 July 1990 (aged 33)	2023	2025	No	No	No
25	Namgyal Bhutia	(India)	RB	14 July 1990 (aged 33)	2020	2026	Yes	Yes	Yes
27	Harsh Palande	(India)	DF	26 January 2005 (aged 19)	2024	2025	No	No	Yes
27	Nikhil Poojary	(India)	RB	3 September 1995 (aged 28)	2024	2028	Yes	Yes	Yes
32	Roshan Singh	(India)	LB	2 February 1999 (aged 25)	2020	2026	Yes	Yes	Yes
42	Clarence Fernandes	(India)	CB	25 July 2004 (aged 19)	2022	2025	Yes	Yes	No
53	Ashik Adhikari	(India)	CB	17 January 2007 (aged 17)	2022		Yes	No	No
Midfielders
6	Harsh Patre	(India)	DM	25 January 2003 (aged 21)	2023	2025	Yes	Yes	Yes
8	Suresh Singh	(India)	DM	7 August 2000 (aged 23)	2019	2028	Yes	Yes	Yes
10	Alberto Noguera	(Spain)	AM	24 September 1989 (aged 34)	2024	2025	Yes	Yes	Yes
14	Soham Varshneya	(India)	MF	14 August 2004 (aged 19)	2024		No	Yes	Yes
18	Pedro Capó	(Spain)	CM	11 December 1990 (aged 33)	2024	2025	Yes	Yes	Yes
23	Lalremtluanga Fanai	(India)	DM	17 September 2004 (aged 19)	2020	2026	Yes	Yes	Yes
31	Vinith Venkatesh	(India)	DM	31 July 2005 (aged 18)	2022	2025	Yes	Yes	Yes
46	Shreyas Ketkar	(India)	RM	1 November 2003 (aged 20)	2022	2025	Yes	Yes	No
Forwards
7	Ryan Williams	(India)	RW	28 October 1993 (aged 30)	2023	2025	Yes	Yes	Yes
9	Sivasakthi Narayanan	(India)	CF	9 July 2001 (aged 22)	2021	2025	Yes	Yes	Yes
11	Sunil Chhetri	(India)	CF	3 August 1984 (aged 39)	2013	2025	Yes	Yes	Yes
17	Édgar Méndez	(Spain)	RW	2 January 1990 (aged 34)	2024	2025	Yes	Yes	Yes
19	Halicharan Narzary	(India)	LW	10 May 1994 (aged 30)	2023	2026	No	Yes	Yes
24	Rohit Danu	(India)	CF	10 July 2002 (aged 21)	2023	2026	Yes	Yes	Yes
29	Shivaldo Singh	(India)	RW	13 June 2004 (aged 19)	2023	2026	Yes	Yes	Yes
30	Jorge Pereyra Díaz	(Argentina)	CF	5 August 1990 (aged 33)	2024	2025	Yes	Yes	Yes
35	Salam Johnson Singh†	(India)	LW	24 September 2001 (aged 22)	2023	2026	No	—N/a	—N/a
37	Kelvin Singh Taorem	(India)	FW	22 November 2005 (aged 18)	2024	2025	No	Yes	Yes
41	Monirul Molla	(India)	CF	1 May 2005 (aged 19)	2023	2026	Yes	Yes	No

^{†} Loaned out.

== Pre-season ==
As a part of the club's pre-season tradition, Bengaluru organised an open training session on 7 July involvong its supporters at the Bangalore Football Stadium. The club also celebrated its 11th anniversary on 20 July. Before departing to Kolkata for the Durand Cup, the Blues trained at Inspire Institute of Sport in Ballari, including a couple of friendlies against Indian under-20 national team at the same venue. In support of Indian athletes at the 2024 Paris Olympics, the Blues donned the JSW designed team India jersey in a training session on 29 July.

=== Friendlies ===
17 July 2024 Friendly	Bengaluru	1–0	India U-20	Inspire Institute of Sport, Ballari
10:00 IST	Chhetri	Report

20 July 2024 Friendly	Bengaluru	–	India U-20	Inspire Institute of Sport, Ballari
10:00 IST		Report

7 September 2024 Friendly	Bengaluru	4–1	Bengaluru United	Sree Kanteerava Stadium, Bengaluru
10:00 IST	Méndez; Chhetri; Danu; Díaz	Report

== Durand Cup ==
The 133rd edition of Durand Cup saw fifth appearance of Bengaluru FC. In the previous edition, the reserve squad representing Bengaluru failed to progress further in the tournament after finishing second in the group stage. For the 2024 edition, the 26-member squad consisting of senior team players was announced on 27th July. They were placed with hosts Mohammedan, Inter Kashi and Indian Navy in Group B. The Blues arrived in Kolkata on 30 July, a day before their first fixture of the campaign.

=== Group stage ===
Pos	Team	Pld	W	D	L	GF	GA	GD	Pts	Qualification	BEN	MSC	IKA	INV
1	Bengaluru	3	3	0	0	10	2	+8	9	Advanced to knockout stage			3–0	4–0
2	Mohammedan (H)	3	1	1	1	4	4	0	4		2–3		1–1	1–0
3	Inter Kashi	3	1	1	1	3	5	−2	4					
4	Indian Navy	3	0	0	3	1	7	−6	0				1–2	

Source: Twitter
Rules for classification: Group stage tiebreakers
(H) Hosts

31 July 2024 Group Stage	Bengaluru	4–0	Indian Navy	Kolkata, West Bengal
19:00 IST	Bheke 11'; Chhetri 42' (pen.); Díaz 81', 90+1'	Report		Stadium: Vivekananda Yuba Bharati Krirangan; Referee: Lakshay; Man of the Match: Rahul Bheke

3 August 2024 Group Stage	Bengaluru	3–0	Inter Kashi	Kolkata, West Bengal
19:00 IST	Méndez 17' (pen.); Noguera 77'; Chhetri 82'	Report		Stadium: Kishore Bharati Krirangan; Referee: Crystal John; Man of the Match: Alberto Noguera

6 August 2024 Group Stage	Mohammedan	2–3	Bengaluru	Kolkata, West Bengal
19:00 IST	Israfil 77'; Mahitosh 90+3'	Report	Jovanović 7'; Dipu 22' (o.g.); Vinith 60'	Stadium: Vivekananda Yuba Bharati Krirangan; Attendance: 4,143; Referee: Venkatesh R Man of the Match: Vinith Venkatesh (Bengaluru FC)

=== Knockout stage ===
23 August 2024 Quarterfinal	Bengaluru	1–0	Kerala Blasters	Kolkata, West Bengal
19:00 IST	Díaz 90+5'	Report		Stadium: Vivekananda Yuba Bharati Krirangan; Referee: Aditya Purkayastha; Man of the Match: Pereyra Díaz

27 August 2024 Semifinal	Mohun Bagan	2–2 (4–3 p)	Bengaluru	Kolkata, West Bengal
17:30 IST	Petratos 68' (pen.); Thapa 84'	Report	Chhetri 43' (pen.) Venkatesh 51'	Stadium: Vivekananda Yuba Bharati Krirangan; Attendance: 18,342; Referee: Venkatesh; Man of the Match: Vishal Kaith (Mohun Bagan)
	Penalties
	Cummings (penalty scored); Manvir (penalty scored); Colaco (penalty scored); Petratos (penalty scored); Stewart (penalty missed)		(penalty scored) Méndez; (penalty scored) Bheke; (penalty scored) Pedro; (penalty missed) Narzary; (penalty missed) Jovanović

== Super League ==
=== Summary ===
Pos	Team	Pld	W	D	L	GF	GA	GD	Pts	Qualification
1	Mohun Bagan (C, W)	24	17	5	2	47	16	+31	56	Qualification for the Champions League Two group stage and semi-finals
2	Goa	24	14	6	4	43	27	+16	48	Qualification for the Champions League Two preliminary stage and semi-finals (Note: Goa qualified for the AFC Champions League Two preliminary stage by winning the 2025 Super Cup.)
3	Bengaluru	24	11	5	8	40	31	+9	38 (Note: Head-to-head points: Bengaluru 7, NorthEast 7, Jamshedpur 3; Head-to-head goal difference: Bengaluru +2, NorthEast -2.)	Qualification for the knockouts
4	NorthEast United	24	10	8	6	46	29	+17	38	Qualification for the knockouts
5	Jamshedpur	24	12	2	10	37	43	−6	38	Qualification for the knockouts

Source: ISL
Rules for classification: 1) points; 2) goal difference; 3) number of goals scored; 4) head-to-head points; 5) head-to-head goal difference; 6) head-to-head goals scored; 7) fair play ranking; 8) drawing of lots
(Note: Head-to-head record is used only after all the matches between the teams in question have been played).
(C) Champions; (W) ISL Cup winners

==== Result summary ====
Overall								Home						Away					
Pld	W	D	L	GF	GA	GD	Pts	W	D	L	GF	GA	GD	W	D	L	GF	GA	GD
24	11	5	8	40	31	+9	38	7	2	3	22	12	+10	4	3	5	18	19	−1

==== Results by round ====
Matchday	1	2	3	4	5	6	7	8	9	10	11	12	13	14	15	16	17	18	19	20	21	22	23	24
Ground	H	H	H	A	H	A	A	H	A	A	H	H	A	A	H	A	H	A	A	H	A	H	A	H
Result	W	W	W	D	W	W	L	D	W	L	W	D	W	D	L	D	L	L	L	W	W	W	D	L
Position	4	1	1	1	1	1	1	1	1	2	1	2	3	3	3	4	3	3	3	3	3	3	3	3

Source: soccerway
A = Away; H = Home; W = Win; D = Draw; L = Loss; = League premiers, qualification to
2025–26 AFC Champions League Two and
2024–25 Indian Super League Semi Final; = Qualification to
2024-25 Indian Super League Semi Final; = Qualification to
2025 Indian Super League playoffs

=== League Matches ===
14 September 2024 1	Bengaluru	1–0	East Bengal	Bengaluru, Karnataka
19:30 IST	Venkatesh 25'; Roshan (yellow card) 83'; Wangjam (yellow card) 90+7'; Sandhu (yellow card) 90+8'	Report	Sekar (yellow card) 4'; Lalchungnunga (yellow card) 8' (yellow-red card) 87'; Yuste (yellow card) 22'; Maher (yellow card) 51'; Silva (yellow card) 87'	Stadium: Sree Kanteerava Stadium; Attendance: 11,923; Referee: Crystal John; Man of the Match: Vinith Venkatesh

19 September 2024 2	Bengaluru	3–0	Hyderabad	Bengaluru, Karnataka
19:30 IST	Bheke 5'; Méndez (yellow card) 44'; Chinglensana (yellow card) 45'; Díaz (yellow card) 56'; Chhetri 85' (pen.), 90'	Report		Stadium: Sree Kanteerava Stadium; Attendance: 7,823; Referee: Tejas Nagvenkar; Man of the Match: Sunil Chhetri

28 September 2024 3	Bengaluru	3–0	Mohun Bagan	Bengaluru, Karnataka
19:30 IST	Méndez 9'; Wangjam 20'; Danu (yellow card) 47'; Chhetri 51' (pen.); Poojary (yellow card) 66'	Report	Stewart (yellow card) 45+7'; Thapa (yellow card) 72'; Ralte (yellow card) 79'; Bhat (yellow card) 89'	Stadium: Sree Kanteerava Stadium; Attendance: 15,323; Referee: Aditya Purkayastha; Man of the Match: Sunil Chhetri

2 October 2024 4	Mumbai City	0–0	Bengaluru	Mumbai, Maharashtra
19:30 IST	Manzorro (yellow card) 40'	Report	Venkatesh (yellow card) 24'; Méndez (yellow card) 36'; Roshan (yellow card) 76'	Stadium: Mumbai Football Arena; Attendance: 6,928; Referee: Senthil Nathan; Man of the Match: Yoëll van Nieff (Mumbai City)

18 October 2024 5	Bengaluru	1–0	Punjab	Bengaluru, Karnataka
19:30 IST	Chinglensana (yellow card) 33' (yellow-red card) 58'; Roshan 43'; Sandhu (yellow card) 90+6'	Report	Sudeesh (yellow card) 26'; Suljić (yellow card) 84'	Stadium: Sree Kanteerava Stadium; Attendance: 9,348; Referee: Jamal Mohamed; Man of the Match: Roshan Singh

25 October 2024 6	Kerala Blasters	1–3	Bengaluru	Kochi, Kerala
19:30 IST	Farooq (yellow card) 3'; Luna (yellow card) 3'; Jiménez 45+2' (pen.); Coeff (yellow card) 79'; Noacha (yellow card) 86'	Report	Díaz 8'; Bheke (yellow card) 45'; Poojary (yellow card) 50'; Méndez 74', 90+4'	Stadium: Jawaharlal Nehru Stadium; Attendance: 34,940; Referee: Tejas Nagvenkar; Man of the Match: Édgar Méndez

2 November 2024 7	Goa	3–0	Bengaluru	Margao, Goa
19:30 IST	Onaindia (yellow card) 49'; Ayush (yellow card) 62'; Sadiku 63'; Brison 72'; Dražić 93'	Report	Méndez (yellow card) 45+2'	Stadium: Fatorda Stadium; Attendance: 9,641; Referee: Aditya Purkayastha; Man of the Match: Dejan Dražić (Goa)

8 November 2024 8	Bengaluru	2–2	NorthEast United	Bengaluru, Karnataka
19:30 IST	Méndez (yellow card) 2'; Noguera 11'; Salah (yellow card) 42'; Jovanović (yellow card) 52'; Williams 70'; Chinglensana (yellow card) 79'	Report	Ajaraie 8', 14'; Dinesh (yellow card) 51'; Bemammer (yellow card) 64'; Gurmeet (yellow card) 88'	Stadium: Sree Kanteerava Stadium; Attendance: 13,783; Referee: Pratik Mondal; Man of the Match: Alaeddine Ajaraie (NorthEast United)

27 November 2024 9	Mohammedan	1–2	Bengaluru	Kolkata, West Bengal
19:30 IST	Manzoki 8' (yellow card) 79'; Irshad (yellow card) 29'; Kasimov (yellow card) 64'; Ralte (yellow card) 70'	Report	Noguera (yellow card) 13'; Bheke (yellow card) 90+1'; Ogier 90+9' (o.g.); Narayanan (yellow card) 90+10'	Stadium: Kishore Bharati Krirangan; Attendance: 2,541; Referee: Crystal John; Man of the Match: Sunil Chhetri

1 December 2024 10	Odisha	4–2	Bengaluru	Bhubaneswar, Odisha
19:30 IST	Mawihmingthanga 10'; Fall 27'; Maurício 45', 60'	Report	Chhetri 52'; Méndez 88'	Stadium: Kalinga Stadium; Attendance: 9,014; Referee: Aditya Purkayastha; Man of the Match: Diego Maurício (Odisha)

7 December 2024 11	Bengaluru	4–2	Kerala Blasters	Bengaluru, Karnataka
19:30 IST	Chhetri 8', 73', 90+8'; Williams 38'; Patre (yellow card) 52'; Sandhu (yellow card) 90+4'	Report	Jiménez 56'; Farooq (yellow card) 57'; Lallawmawma 67'	Stadium: Sree Kanteerava Stadium; Attendance: 22,302; Referee: Rahul Gupta; Man of the Match: Sunil Chhetri

14 December 2024 12	Bengaluru	2–2	Goa	Bengaluru, Karnataka
17:00 IST	Patre (yellow card) 44'; Williams 71' (yellow card) 90+4'; Díaz 83' (yellow card) 90+1'	Report	Jhingan 7'; Tavora (yellow card) 43' (goal) 66'; Tiwari (yellow card) 81'; Brison (yellow card) 89'	Stadium: Sree Kanteerava Stadium; Attendance: 15,411; Referee: Harish kundu Man of the Match: Ryan Williams

28 December 2024 13	Chennaiyin	2–4	Bengaluru	Chennai, Tamil Nadu
19:30 IST	Laldinpuia (yellow card) 12'; Dessai (yellow card) 86'; Yadvad 19'; Hnamte 45+2'	Report	Williams 16', 68'; Chhetri 43'; Díaz (yellow card) 45+3'; Renthlei 82' (o.g.); Salah (yellow card) 90+1'	Stadium: Marina Arena; Attendance: 10,007; Referee: Pratik Mondal; Man of the Match: Ryan Williams

4 January 2025 14	Jamshedpur	2–1	Bengaluru	Jamshedpur, Jharkhand
19:30 IST	Hernández (yellow card) 45'; Murray 84' (yellow card) 84'; Uvais 90'; Sanan (yellow card) 90+3'	Report	Noguera 19'; Bheke (yellow card) 85'	Stadium: JRD Tata Sports Complex; Attendance: 12,109; Referee: R Venkatesh; Man of the Match: Jordan Murray (Jamshedpur)

11 January 2025 15	Bengaluru	0–1	Mohammedan SC	Bengaluru, Karnataka
17:00 IST	Chinglensana (yellow card) 46'; Noguera (yellow card) 90'	Report	Kasimov 88'; Zoherliana (yellow card) 36'; Bikash (yellow card) 90+8'; Manvir (yellow card) 81'	Stadium: Sree Kanteerava Stadium; Attendance: 10,789; Referee: Crystal John; Man of the Match: Florent Ogier (Mohammedan)

18 January 2025 16	Hyderabad	1–1	Bengaluru	Hyderabad, Telangana
17:00 IST	Murgaonkar 21'; Manoj (yellow card) 63'; Sunny (yellow card) 84'	Report	Bheke (yellow card) 68'; Sunil Chhetri 78'	Stadium: Gachibowli Stadium; Attendance: 2,072; Referee: Pranjal Banerjee; Man of the Match: Devendra Murgaonkar (Hyderabad)

22 January 2025 17	Bengaluru	2–3	Odisha FC	Bengaluru, Karnataka
19:30 IST	Williams (yellow card) 1'; Méndez 10'; Chhetri 13'; Jovanović (red card); Salah (yellow card) 57'	Report	Rahul (yellow card) 3'; Maurício 29' (pen.), 38'; Mawihminghtanga (yellow card) 8' (goal) 50'; Gama (yellow card) 61'; Boumous (yellow card) 85'; Jahouh (yellow card) 90+1'	Stadium: Sree Kanteerava Stadium; Attendance: 9,881; Referee: Pratik Mondal; Man of the Match: Diego Mauricio (Odisha)

27 January 2025 18	Mohun Bagan	1–0	Bengaluru	Kolkata, West Bengal
19:30 IST	Ralte (yellow card) 8'; Bose (yellow card) 29'; Colaco 74' (yellow card) 76'	Report		Stadium: Salt Lake Stadium; Attendance: 41,925; Referee: Rahul Gupta; Man of the Match: Lalengmawia Ralte (Mohun Bagan)

1 February 2025 19	Punjab	3–2	Bengaluru	New Delhi
17:00 IST	Suljić (yellow card) 9' (goal) 55' (pen.); Prabhu (yellow card) 17'; Vidal (yellow card) 37'; Mrzljak 79'; Majcen 90+6'	Report	Méndez 49'; Bheke 90+2'	Stadium: Jawaharlal Nehru Stadium; Attendance: 3,139; Referee: R Venkatesh; Man of the Match: Luka Majcen (Punjab)

9 February 2025 20	Bengaluru	3–0	Jamshedpur FC	Bengaluru, Karnataka
19:30 IST	Bheke (yellow card) 3'; Méndez 43'; Noguera 57', 82'	Report	Sanan (yellow card) 56'	Stadium: Sree Kanteerava Stadium; Attendance: 10,154; Referee: Crystal John; Man of the Match: Alberto Noguera

21 February 2025 21	NorthEast United	0–2	Bengaluru	Shillong, Meghalaya
19:30 IST	Samte (yellow card) 43'; Nickson (yellow card) 90+6'	Report	Williams 3'; Salah (yellow card) 18'; Bheke (yellow card) 41'; Noguera 81'; Méndez (yellow card) 90+1'	Stadium: Jawaharlal Nehru Stadium; Attendance: 14,201; Referee: Rahul gupta Man of the Match: Alberto Noguera

25 February 2025 22	Bengaluru	1–0	Chennaiyin	Bengaluru, Karnataka
19:30 IST	Bheke 37' (yellow card) 90+5'	Report	Edwards (yellow card) 39'; Shields (yellow card) 88'	Stadium: Sree Kanteerava Stadium; Attendance: 7,367; Referee: Aditya Purkayastha; Man of the Match: Rahul Bheke

2 March 2025 23	East Bengal	1–1	Bengaluru	Kolkata, West Bengal
19:30 IST	Bouli 11' (yellow card) 49'; Lakra (yellow card) 41'; Diamantakos (red card); Celis (yellow card) 90+3'	Report	Bhutia (yellow card) 43'; Noguera (yellow card) 45+3'; Venkatesh (yellow card) 64'; Chhetri 90+1' (pen.)	Stadium: Salt Lake Stadium; Attendance: 17,964; Referee: Harish Kundu; Man of the Match: Souvik Chakrabarti (East Bengal)

11 March 2025 24	Bengaluru	0–2	Mumbai City	Bengaluru, Karnataka
19:30 IST	Williams (yellow card) 42'; Fanai (yellow card) 72'; Méndez (yellow card) 88'; Roshan (yellow card) 89'	Report	Chhangte 8'; Karelis 37' (pen.)	Stadium: Sree Kanteerava Stadium; Attendance: Lallianzuala Chhangte (Mumbai City); Referee: R Venkatesh

=== Play-offs ===
29 March 2025 Knockout 1	Bengaluru	5–0	Mumbai City	Bengaluru, Karnataka
19:30 IST	Wangjam 9'; Méndez 42' (pen.); Roshan (yellow card) 55'; Williams 62'; Chhetri 76'; Díaz 83' (yellow card) 85'	Report	Van Nieff (yellow card) 30'; Mehtab (yellow card) 41'; Fernandes (yellow card) 45'	Stadium: Sree Kanteerava Stadium; Attendance: 16,123; Referee: Harish Kundu; Man of the Match: Suresh Singh

2 April 2025 Semi-final Leg 1	Bengaluru	2–0	Goa	Bengaluru, Karnataka
19:30 IST	Jhingan 42' (o.g.); Méndez 51'; Williams (yellow card) 59'	Report	McHugh (yellow card) 37'; Herrera (yellow card) 37'	Stadium: Sree Kanteerava Stadium; Attendance: 19,443; Referee: Aditya Purkayastha; Man of the Match: Namgyal Bhutia

6 April 2025 Semi-final Leg 2	Goa	2–1	Bengaluru	Margao, Goa
19:30 IST	Guarrotxena (yellow card) 2'; Sangwan (yellow card) 22'; Herrera 49'; Onaindia (yellow card) 81'; Sadiku 88'; Lara (yellow card) 90+7'	Report	Noguera (yellow card) 44'; Chhetri 90+2'	Stadium: Fatorda Stadium; Attendance: 16,875; Referee: Senthil Nathan; Man of the Match: Sunil Chhetri

=== Final ===
12 April 2025 Final	Mohun Bagan	2–1 (a.e.t.)	Bengaluru	Kolkata, West Bengal
19:30 IST	Cummings 72' (pen.); Ralte (yellow card) 90+1'; Maclaren 96'; Tangri (yellow card) 106'; Stewart (yellow card) 111'; Kuruniyan (yellow card) 111'	Report	Rodríguez 49' (o.g.); Díaz (yellow card) 85'; Capó (yellow card) 89'; Narayanan (yellow card) 118'	Stadium: Salt Lake Stadium; Attendance: 59,112; Referee: Senthil Nathan; Man of the Match: Jamie Maclaren (Mohun Bagan)

== Super Cup ==
On 7 April, the AIFF announced the fixtures for the April 2025 edition of the Super Cup. Four days after going down in the ISL Finals, the Blues announced a 28-member squad for the tournament in Odisha. Bengaluru FC were pitted against the I-League club Inter Kashi in the round of 16, where Inter Kashi upseted Bengaluru and knocked out Bengaluru in Round of 16 only.

Round of 16
20 April
8	Kerala Blasters	2
9	East Bengal	0
21 April
2	Goa	3
IL4	Gokulam Kerala	0
21 April
7	Odisha	0
10	Punjab	3
23 April
3	Bengaluru	1 (3)
IL2	Inter Kashi (p)	1 (5)
23 April
6	Mumbai City	4
11	Chennaiyin	0
24 April
4	Northeast United	6
13	Mohammedan	0
24 April
5	Jamshedpur	2
12	Hyderabad	0

Quarter-finals
26 April
8	Kerala Blasters	1
1	Mohun Bagan	2
26 April
2	Goa	2
10	Punjab	1
27 April
IL2	Inter Kashi	0
6	Mumbai City	1
27 April
4	Northeast United	0 (4)
5	Jamshedpur (p)	0 (5)

Semi-finals
30 April
1	Mohun Bagan	1
2	Goa	3
30 April
6	Mumbai City	0
5	Jamshedpur	1

Final
3 May
2	Goa	3
5	Jamshedpur	0

23 April 2025 Round of 16	Bengaluru	1-1 (3–5 p)	Inter Kashi	Bhubaneswar
16:30 IST (UTC+5:30)	Ryan 62'	AIFF; I-League; PDF	Babović 87'	Stadium: Kalinga Stadium; Attendance: 3,216; Referee: Venkatesh R Man of the Match: Nikola Stojanović (Inter Kashi)
	Penalties
	Díaz (penalty scored); Ryan (penalty scored); Alberto (penalty missed); Chhetri (penalty scored)		(penalty scored) Matija Babović; (penalty scored) Varghese; (penalty scored) Muñoz; (penalty scored) Aritra Das; (penalty scored) Stojanović

== Accolades ==
Forward Ryan Williams was awarded with the Indian Super League's Player of the Month award for the month of December. While the local player Vinith Venkatesh from Austin Town won the season's first Emerging Player of the Month award in September. Sunil Chhetri remained as the top Indian goalscorer of the season with fourteen goals to his name, equalling his record in 2017–18 season.

=== Player of the match awards ===
Rank	Player	ISL	DC	SC	Total
1	(India) Sunil Chhetri	5	0	0	5
2	(Spain) Alberto Noguera	2	1	0	3
3	(India) Vinith Venkatesh	1	1	0	2
3	(Australia) Ryan Williams	2	0	0	2
3	(India) Rahul Bheke	1	1	0	2
6	(Argentina) Pereyra Díaz	0	1	0	1
6	(India) Roshan Singh	1	0	0	1
6	(Spain) Édgar Méndez	1	0	0	1
6	(India) Suresh Wangjam	1	0	0	1

Updated: 12 April 2025

== Statistics ==
=== Appearances and goals ===
No.	Pos	Nat	Player	Total		ISL		Durand Cup		Super Cup	
No.	Pos	Nat	Player	Apps	Goals	Apps	Goals	Apps	Goals	Apps	Goals
Goalkeepers
1	GK	(India) IND	Gurpreet Singh Sandhu	31	0	25+1	0	5+0	0	0+0	0
22	GK	(India) IND	Sahil Poonia	1	0	1+0	0	0+0	0	0+0	0
28	GK	(India) IND	Lalthuammawia Ralte	3	0	2+0	0	0+1	0	0+0	0
Defenders
2	CB	(India) IND	Chinglensana Singh	28	0	19+4	0	1+4	0	0+0	0
5	CB	(Australia) AUS	Aleksandar Jovanović	26	1	13+8	0	5+0	1	0+0	0
12	RB	(India) IND	Mohamed Salah	16	0	4+10	0	1+1	0	0+0	0
14	LB	(India) IND	Jessel Carneiro	0	0	0+0	0	0+0	0	0+0	0
25	RB	(India) IND	Namgyal Bhutia	9	0	7+2	0	0+0	0	0+0	0
27	RB	(India) IND	Nikhil Poojary	21	0	15+2	0	4+0	0	0+0	0
2	RB	(India) IND	Rahul Bheke	31	4	25+1	3	5+0	1	0+0	0
32	LB	(India) IND	Roshan Singh	32	1	28+0	1	4+0	0	0+0	0
42	CB	(India) IND	Clarence Fernandes	1	0	0+0	0	0+1	0	0+0	0
53	CB	(India) IND	Ashik Adhikari	0	0	0+0	0	0+0	0	0+0	0
Midfielders
8	DM	(India) IND	Suresh Singh	29	2	25+1	2	3+0	0	0+0	0
10	AM	(Spain) ESP	Alberto Noguera	30	6	24+1	5	4+1	1	0+0	0
14	MF	(India) IND	Soham Varshneya	1	0	0+1	0	0+0	0	0+0	0
18	CM	(Spain) ESP	Pedro Capó	29	0	23+2	0	4+0	0	0+0	0
21	RM	(India) IND	Shreyas Ketkar	1	0	0+0	0	0+1	0	0+0	0
23	DM	(India) IND	Lalremtluanga Fanai	28	0	6+17	0	2+3	0	0+0	0
49	DM	(India) IND	Harsh Patre	6	0	3+2	0	1+0	0	0+0	0
Forwards
7	RW	(Australia) AUS	Ryan Williams	25	8	17+5	7	2+1	0	0+0	1
9	CF	(India) IND	Sivasakthi Narayanan	17	0	4+10	0	3+0	0	0+0	0
11	CF	(India) IND	Sunil Chhetri	33	17	19+9	14	1+4	3	0+0	0
17	RW	(Spain) ESP	Édgar Méndez	29	10	22+3	9	2+2	1	0+0	0
19	LW	(India) IND	Halicharan Narzary	1	0	0+0	0	0+1	0	0+0	0
24	CF	(India) IND	Rohit Danu	5	0	2+3	0	0+0	0	0+0	0
29	RW	(India) IND	Shivaldo Singh	7	0	1+2	0	3+1	0	0+0	0
30	CF	(Argentina) ARG	Jorge Pereyra Díaz	22	6	11+6	3	3+2	3	0+0	0
31	RW	(India) IND	Vinith Venkatesh	18	3	8+7	1	2+1	2	0+0	0
32	FW	(India) IND	Kelvin Singh	1	0	0+1	0	0+0	0	0+0	0
41	CF	(India) IND	Monirul Molla	1	0	0+1	0	0+0	0	0+0	0

- Source: soccerway

Updated: 12 April 2025

=== Goal scorers ===
Rank	No.	Pos	Nat	Player	ISL	DC	SC	Total
1	11	CF	(India)	Sunil Chhetri	14	3	0	17
2	17	RW	(Spain)	Édgar Méndez	9	1	0	10
3	7	RW	(Australia)	Ryan Williams	7	0	1	8
4	10	AM	(Spain)	Alberto Noguera	5	1	0	6
4	30	CF	(Argentina)	Pereyra Díaz	3	3	0	6
6	2	RB	(India)	Rahul Bheke	3	1	0	4
7	31	DM	(India)	Vinith Venkatesh	1	2	0	3
8	8	DM	(India)	Suresh Singh	2	0	0	2
9	5	CB	(Australia)	Aleksandar Jovanović	0	1	0	1
9	32	LB	(India)	Roshan Singh	1	0	0	1
Own goals					3	1	0	4
Totals					46	13	0	59

Updated: 12 April 2025

=== Clean sheets ===
Rank	No.	Pos	Nat	Player	ISL	DC	SC	Total
1	1	GK	(India)	Gurpreet Singh Sandhu	8	3	0	11
2	28	GK	(India)	Lalthuammawia Ralte	2	0	0	2
Totals					8	3	0	11

Updated: 12 April 2025

=== Disciplinary record ===
Rank	No.	Pos	Nat	Player	ISL			DC			SC			Total			Points	Notes
Rank	No.	Pos	Nat	Player	Yellow card	Second yellow card	Red card	Yellow card	Second yellow card	Red card	Yellow card	Second yellow card	Red card	Yellow card	Second yellow card	Red card	Points	Notes
1	3	RB	(India)	Rahul Bheke	7	0	0	1	0	0	0	0	0	8	0	0	8	Missed the away game against East Bengal
2	2	CB	(India)	Chinglensana Singh	3	1	0	1	0	0	0	0	0	4	1	0	7	Missed the home game against Kerala Blasters
2	17	RW	(Spain)	Édgar Méndez	6	0	0	1	0	0	0	0	0	7	0	0	7	N/A
4	30	CF	(Argentina)	Pereyra Díaz	5	0	0	1	0	0	0	0	0	6	0	0	6	N/A
4	32	LB	(India)	Roshan Singh	4	0	0	1	0	0	1	0	0	6	0	0	6	N/A
4	10	AM	(Spain)	Alberto Noguera	4	0	0	1	0	0	1	0	0	6	0	0	6	N/A
7	27	RB	(India)	Nikhil Poojary	2	0	0	3	0	0	0	0	0	5	0	0	5	N/A
8	1	GK	(India)	Gurpreet Singh	3	0	0	1	0	0	0	0	0	4	0	0	4	N/A
8	5	CB	(Australia)	Jovanović	1	0	1	0	0	0	0	0	0	1	0	1	4	Missed the away game against Mohun Bagan SG
8	12	RB	(India)	Mohamed Salah	4	0	0	0	0	0	0	0	0	4	0	0	4	N/A
8	7	RW	(India)	Ryan Williams	4	0	0	0	0	0	0	0	0	4	0	0	4	N/A
8	31	DM	(India)	Vinith Venkatesh	2	0	0	1	0	0	0	0	0	3	0	0	3	N/A
13	24	CF	(India)	Rohit Danu	1	0	0	1	0	0	0	0	0	2	0	0	2	N/A
13	6	DM	(India)	Harsh Patre	2	0	0	0	0	0	0	0	0	2	0	0	2	Missed the away game against Chennaiyin
13	9	CF	(India)	Sivasakthi Narayanan	2	0	0	0	0	0	0	0	0	2	0	0	2	N/A
13	8	DM	(India)	Suresh Singh	1	0	0	0	0	1	0	0	0	2	0	0	2	N/A
17	25	RB	(India)	Bhutia	1	0	0	0	0	0	0	0	0	1	0	0	1	N/A
17	23	DM	(India)	Lalremtluanga Fanai	1	0	0	0	0	0	0	0	0	1	0	0	1	N/A
17	18	CM	(Spain)	Pedro Capó	1	0	0	0	0	0	0	0	0	1	0	0	1	N/A
Totals					54	1	1	12	0	0	0	0	0	66	1	1	72	N/A

Updated: 12 April 2025

== See also ==
- List of Bengaluru FC seasons
