= Eric Williams (football coach) =

English footballer and manager

Personal information
- Place of birth: Kent, England
- Position: Midfielder

Youth career
- Canterbury City

Senior career*
Years	Team	Apps	(Gls)
- Canterbury City
1980	Newcastle KB United		
1981	Po Chai Pills		

International career
	England U18	3	

Managerial career
- 1988-1990: North Perth Croatia
- 1992-1993: Spearwood Dalmatinac
- 1993-1995: Floreat Athena
- 1994-1997: Western Australia State Team
- Stirling Lions
- 1999-2000: Swan I.C.
- 2004–2005: Sriwijaya
- 2007–2008: Perseman Manokwari
- 2008: PSMS Medan
- 2010–2012: Yangon United
- 2014–2015: Yangon United
- 2015: Myanmar U16
- 2016–2017: Melaka United
- 2020: Swan I.C.
- * Club domestic league appearances and goals

Eric Williams is an English football manager.

== Coaching career ==
Starting his coaching career in Western Australia to augment his income, he managed North Perth Croatia, Spearwood Dalmatinac and Floreat Athena. Between 1994 and 1997 he led the Western Australia State Team to historic victories over English clubs West Ham United and Nottingham Forest. He then coached at Stirling Lions and Swan I.C. before moving to Indonesia.

His first involvement in Myanmar was when he was invited to build the basic structure of a football academy right next to the Yangon United training site. The Kent native was first named coach of MNL title contenders Yangon United in 2010. At first, his appointment date coincided with his second marriage in Indonesia so he had to return later.

Williams was commissioned to fill in the vacancy left by previous Melaka United coach Mat Zan Mat Aris in November 2016 and won his first game 1–0 over PKNS FC.

=== Other ===
Just after moving to Indonesia in 2002, he developed a national under-17s youth program.

Williams was inducted into the Football Hall of Fame Western Australia in recognition of his achievements as the head coach of the Western Australia State Team.

He is helping the Rhys Williams Foundation which supports children in Indonesia to play football.

== Personal life ==
The coach has three sons, Rhys, Ryan and Aryn, who were born in Australia and are all professional footballers. Williams offered his eldest son Rhys (who plays for Middlesbrough FC in the Championship) a contract in the Malaysian Super League but it was promptly declined by Perth Glory. Incidentally, he is adept at speaking Bahasa Melayu, the Malaysian language.

== Achievements ==
- Myanmar National League(1): 2011
- MFF Cup(1): 2011
