= Ryan Williams (footballer, born 1993) =

Indian footballer (born 1993)

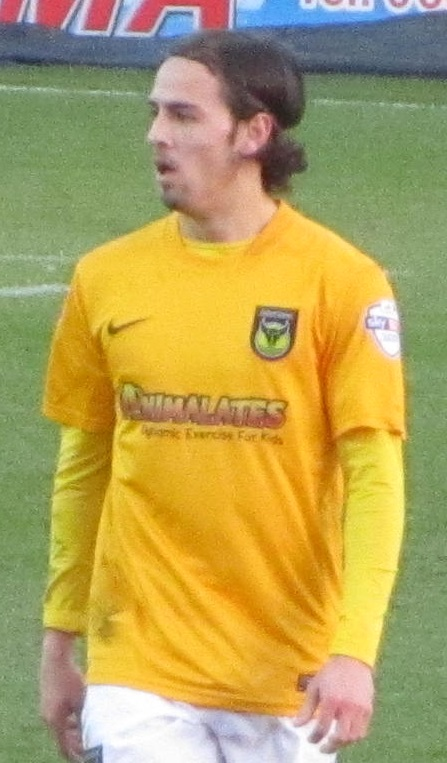
- Williams with Oxford United in 2014

Personal information
- Full name: Ryan Dale Williams
- Date of birth: 28 October 1993 (age 33)
- Place of birth: Subiaco, Perth, Australia
- Height: 5 ft 8 in (1.73 m)
- Position: Winger

Team information
- Current team: Bengaluru
- Number: 10

Youth career
- –2010: ECU Joondalup
- 2010–2011: Portsmouth

Senior career*
Years	Team	Apps	(Gls)
2011–2012	Portsmouth	4	(0)
2012–2015	Fulham	2	(0)
2013	→ Gillingham (loan)	0	(0)
2013–2014	→ Oxford United (loan)	36	(7)
2014–2015	→ Barnsley (loan)	5	(0)
2015–2017	Barnsley	21	(1)
2017–2019	Rotherham United	81	(5)
2019–2021	Portsmouth	67	(8)
2021–2022	Oxford United	33	(2)
2022–2023	Perth Glory	24	(4)
2023–	Bengaluru	48	(14)

International career^{‡}
2012–2013	Australia U20	12	(1)
2015	Australia U23	3	(0)
2019	Australia	1	(0)
2026–	India	7	(2)
- * Club domestic league appearances and goals as of 17 October 2026 ‡ National team caps and goals as of 22:00, 15 November 2026 (UTC)

Ryan Dale Williams (born 28 October 1993) is a professional footballer who plays as a winger for Indian Super League club Bengaluru. Born in Australia, and a former Australian international, he represents the India national team.

== Early life ==
Williams was born in Perth, Australia. His mother Audrey was born to an Anglo-Indian family from Bombay, India, and his father Eric was born in Kent, England. His maternal grandfather Lincoln "Linky" Grostate played for Bombay in the Santosh Trophy in the 1950s. His mother Audrey Williams (née Grostate) also played football in England and then in Australia where she represented Western Australia in the national championships in the 1980s. His father Eric Williams is a football manager who has coached clubs across Australia and Southeast Asia.

== Club career ==
=== Portsmouth ===
Williams joined Portsmouth in July 2010, signing a scholarship with the clubs' academy side. There were initial issues concerning international clearance, with the FFA (Football Federation Australia) failing to release vital paperwork to allow Williams to play, but this was eventually resolved on 12 November. He played his first match for Portsmouth on 6 August 2010, in a friendly against Farnborough. His first competitive academy match for Portsmouth was a 4–1 loss to Chelsea.

Williams was promoted to training with Steve Cotterill's first-team upon returning for the 2011–12 season. This culminated in Williams making his first appearance with the first-team in a 4–0 win over Havant & Waterlooville, in which he produced a lively display, contributing an assist. He went on to feature against Chelsea and travelled to the US with the first-team. Cotterill indicated that he was ready to promote Williams to the Portsmouth first-team squad, and Williams was selected to be on the bench for the Championship match against Middlesbrough with the 17 jersey.

He made his professional debut in the opening-day match against Middlesbrough, on 6 August 2011, after he came off the bench to replace Hermann Hreiðarsson in the 63rd minute, playing against his older brother Rhys, who scored in the match.

=== Fulham ===
On 31 January 2012, Fulham announced the transfer deadline day signing of Williams from Portsmouth for an undisclosed fee, having impressed during a reserve game against Wolverhampton Wanderers the previous night.

On 13 May 2014, following the relegation of Fulham and his conclusion to his loan spell, Williams signed a new two-year contract with the club.

Williams signed for Gillingham in League Two on a one-month loan deal on 14 February 2013 but failed to make an appearance for the Kent club before being recalled by Fulham.

On 3 August 2013, Williams joined Oxford United on loan until 1 January 2014, and made his debut against Portsmouth at Fratton Park. He scored his first senior goal on 28 September 2013 in a League Two win over Hartlepool United. On 19 December 2013, Fulham agreed to extend his loan deal until the end of the season. After making 35 appearances and scoring six times, Williams made his final appearance for the club against relegation battlers Northampton Town. Williams scored his seventh goal of the season to give his team the lead. However, towards the end of the first half he was sent off for kicking Ricky Ravenhill. Northampton Town subsequently took the lead and went on to win 3–1, which led to Northampton Town surviving relegation and Oxford United missing out of the play-offs.

After being included in two matches for Fulham at the start of the 2014–15 season, Williams joined Barnsley on an initial one-month loan on 2 October 2014. Williams made his Barnsley debut ten days later on 12 October 2014, in a 3–1 win over Bradford City. Having made seven appearances, Williams' loan spell was extended until 1 January 2015. However, Williams' first team appearances were soon reduced due to his international commitments and he suffered a groin injury before returned to his parent club.

=== Barnsley ===
On 26 July 2015, Williams re-joined Barnsley, but this time on a permanent basis for an undisclosed fee. His first and what turned out to be only goal for Barnsley was a late winner in a 4–3 win at Cardiff City.

=== Rotherham United ===
On 20 June 2017, Williams moved across South Yorkshire to join Rotherham United on a two-year deal. On 30 May 2019 it was announced that he would leave at the end of the season, upon expiry of his contract.

=== Return to Portsmouth ===
On 26 June 2019, Williams re-signed for his first club, Portsmouth.

=== Return to Oxford ===
On 9 June 2021, Williams rejoined former club Oxford United when his contract expired at Portsmouth. He signed a two-year deal.

=== Perth Glory ===
In June 2022, Williams left Oxford United to return to Australia, joining Perth Glory for an undisclosed fee, signing a three-year contract. He was welcomed back to Perth scoring an absolute stunner out of the box goal against Western United.

=== Bengaluru ===
On 28 July 2023, Williams signed a one-year contract with Indian Super League club Bengaluru, with an option for a further year. In his debut season, he scored three goals, earning the club's Player's Player of the Season award.

In his second season, Williams scored seven goals and provided four assists as the club reached the 2025 ISL Cup final, where they lost to Mohun Bagan in extra time. He was named Fan's Player of the Year at the end of the season. On 24 October 2025, the club announced that Williams had extended his stay at the club.

== International career ==
Born in Australia to an Anglo-Indian mother and an English father, Williams was eligible to represent four countries: Australia, England, Wales, and India.

Williams played for the under-20 and under-23 sides, representing Australia at U20 level at the 2012 AFC U-19 Championship in United Arab Emirates and at the 2013 FIFA U-20 World Cup in Turkey. He was called up to the Australia senior squad in May 2019 for the friendly game against South Korea on 7 June. He made his international debut as a second-half substitute in the game.

In November 2025, Williams acquired Indian citizenship and had to surrender his Australian citizenship, as dual nationality is prohibited by India. On 18 November 2025, Football Australia issued him a No Objection Certificate (NOC), allowing him to officially represent India. On 19 November 2025, his request to switch international allegiance to India was approved by FIFA. On 13 November 2025, he debuted with India in a 6–1 unofficial friendly win over Bhutan, where he scored a goal.

Williams played his first official match for India against Hong Kong on 31 March 2026 in the final third round match of the 2027 AFC Asian Cup qualifiers. He scored his first international goal in the fourth minute, becoming the fastest debutant goal-scorer for India, surpassing the sixth-minute scoring record of K. Appalaraju and Mehtab Hossain. India went on to win the fixture 2–1.

In his third cap, a friendly against Panama on 25 September 2026, Williams opened the scoring in an eventual 1–1 draw. This goal meant he became the first-ever Indian player to score a goal against Panama.

== Personal life ==
Williams is the younger brother of Rhys Williams and the twin brother of Aryn Williams, who are both also professional footballers.

== Career statistics ==
=== Club ===
As of match played 16 May 2026

Appearances and goals by club, country and competition
Club	Season	League			National cup (Note: Includes FA Cup, Super Cup)		League cup (Note: Includes EFL Cup)		Other		Total	
Club	Season	Division	Apps	Goals	Apps	Goals	Apps	Goals	Apps	Goals	Apps	Goals
Portsmouth	2011–12	Championship	4	0	1	0	1	0	—		6	0
Fulham	2011–12	Premier League	0	0	0	0	0	0	—		0	0
Fulham	2012–13	Premier League	0	0	0	0	0	0	—		0	0
Fulham	2014–15	Championship	2	0	0	0	1	0	—		3	0
Fulham	Total		2	0	0	0	1	0	0	0	3	0
Gillingham (loan)	2012–13	League Two	0	0	0	0	0	0	0	0	0	0
Oxford United (loan)	2013–14	League Two	36	7	4	1	1	0	1 (Note: Appearance(s) in Football League Trophy)	0	42	8
Barnsley (loan)	2014–15	League One	5	0	1	0	0	0	1	0	7	0
Barnsley	2015–16	League One	5	0	0	0	0	0	1	0	6	0
Barnsley	2016–17	Championship	16	1	1	0	0	0	—		17	1
Barnsley	Total		21	1	1	0	0	0	1	0	23	1
Rotherham United	2017–18	League One	42	4	1	0	1	0	3 (Note: Appearances in 2017–18 EFL League One play-offs)	0	47	4
Rotherham United	2018–19	Championship	39	1	1	0	1	0	0	0	41	1
Rotherham United	Total		81	5	2	0	2	0	3	0	88	5
Portsmouth	2019–20	League One	26	3	4	0	1	0	6 (Note: 4 appearances in 2019–20 EFL League One play-offs and two appearances in Football League Trophy)	0	37	3
Portsmouth	2020–21	League One	41	5	3	0	2	0	2	0	48	5
Portsmouth	Total		67	8	7	0	3	0	8	0	85	8
Oxford United	2021–22	League One	33	2	2	0	0	0	1	0	36	2
Perth Glory	2022–23	A-League Men	24	4	0	0	—		—		24	4
Bengaluru	2023–24	Indian Super League	16	3	2	0	—		—		18	3
Bengaluru	2024–25	Indian Super League	18	6	1	1	—		7 (Note: Four Appearances and one goal in ISL Cup playoffs, three appearances in Durand Cup)	1	26	8
Bengaluru	2025–26	Indian Super League	12	4	3	2	—		—		15	6
Bengaluru	Total		46	13	6	3	0	0	7	1	59	17
Career total			319	40	24	4	8	0	22	1	373	45

=== International ===
As of match played 15 November 2026

Appearances and goals by national team and year
National team	Year	Apps	Goals
Australia	2019	1	0
India	2026	7	2
Total		8	2

As of match played 15 November 2026
India score listed first, score column indicates score after each Williams goal

List of international goals scored by Ryan Williams
No.	Date	Venue	Cap	Opponent	Score	Result	Competition
1	31 March 2026	Jawaharlal Nehru Stadium, Kochi, India	1	Hong Kong	1–0	2–1	2027 AFC Asian Cup qualification
2	25 September 2026	Sree Kanteerava Stadium, Bengaluru, India	3	Panama	1–0	1–1	Friendly

== Honours ==
Barnsley

- EFL Trophy: 2015–16
- EFL League One play-offs: 2016

Rotherham United

- EFL League One play-offs: 2018

Portsmouth

- EFL Trophy runner-up: 2019–20

Bengaluru

- ISL Cup runner-up: 2024–25
