= Lalremtluanga Fanai =

Indian footballer (born 2004)

Personal information
- Date of birth: 17 September 2004 (age 22)
- Place of birth: Aizwal, Mizoram, India
- Height: 1.78 m (5 ft 10 in)
- Position: Midfielder

Team information
- Current team: Bengaluru
- Number: 23

Youth career
- 2021–22: Bengaluru

Senior career*
Years	Team	Apps	(Gls)
2022–23	Bengaluru B	3	(0)
2023–	Bengaluru	42	(0)

International career^{‡}
2021	India U16	2	(0)
2025–	India U23	5	(0)
2025–	India	1	(0)
- * Club domestic league appearances and goals as of 15:30, 23 May 2025 (UTC) ‡ National team caps and goals as of 15:30, 8 November 2025 (UTC)

Lalremtluanga Fanai (born 10 July 2002) is an Indian professional footballer who plays as a winger for the Indian Super League club Bengaluru and the India national football team.

== Club career ==
=== Bengaluru ===
Fanai was a student of first batch of Tata Trusts Centre Of Excellence for football in Aizwal, Mizoram. He was there at the centre for few years before joining youth team of Bengaluru FC. He played at the Development League and won the 2022 edition with Bengaluru. For 2023–24 season, he was promoted to the Bengaluru B team. He played few matches at the 2022–23 I-League 2 and a single match at the 2023 Super Cup. From the next season he has been a part of the main team of Bengaluru. He regularly featured for the team for 2023–24 season, played almost all the league and cup matches.

== International career ==
Fanai was part of India under-17 squad under Bibiano Fernandes, that would have played the 2020 AFC U-16 Championship. However, the championship was cancelled due to COVID-19 pandemic. As a preparation, India played two international friendlies against United Arab Emirates. Fanai played both the matches.

In May 2025, then India under-23 head coach Naushad Moosa listed Fanai in the 29-members probable squad for two friendlies that will be held in Tajikistan in June 2025.

== Career statistics ==
=== Club ===
As of 23 March 2026

Appearances and goals by club, season and competition
Club	Season	League			Super Cup		Durand Cup		Continental		Total	
Club	Season	Division	Apps	Goals	Apps	Goals	Apps	Goals	Apps	Goals	Apps	Goal
Bengaluru B	2022–23	I-League 2	3	0	–		–		–		3	0
Bengaluru B	Total		3	0	–		–		–		3	0
Bengaluru	2022–23	Indian Super League	–		1	0	–		–		1	0
Bengaluru	2023–24	Indian Super League	10	0	3	0	3	0	0	0	16	0
Bengaluru	2024–25	Indian Super League	26	0	1	0	5	0	0	0	32	0
Bengaluru	2025-26	Indian Super League	6	0	1	0	0	0	0	0	7	0
Total			42	0	6	0	8	0	0	0	56	0
Career total			45	0	6	0	8	0	0	0	59	0

=== International ===
As of 18 November 2025

National team	Year	Apps	Goals
India	2025	1	0
Total		1	0

== Honours ==
Bengaluru B

- Development League: 2022
