= Aryn Williams =

Australian soccer player

Personal information
- Full name: Aryn Glen Williams
- Date of birth: 28 October 1993 (age 33)
- Place of birth: Perth, Australia
- Height: 1.76 m (5 ft 9 in)
- Position: Defensive midfielder

Team information
- Current team: Olympic Kingsway

Youth career
- ECU Joondalup
- 2010–2013: Burnley

Senior career*
Years	Team	Apps	(Gls)
2013–2015	Floreat Athena	40	(4)
2015–2017	Perth Glory	22	(0)
2016–2017	Perth Glory NPL	4	(0)
2017	Preston Lions	4	(0)
2017–2019	NEROCA	36	(3)
2018	→ Hume City (loan)	9	(0)
2019–2021	Persebaya Surabaya	17	(3)
2021	Havant & Waterlooville	1	(0)
2021–2022	Oakleigh Cannons	6	(0)
2023	Balcatta Etna		
2023–	Olympic Kingsway		
- * Club domestic league appearances and goals as of 22 November 2023

Aryn Glen Williams (born 28 October 1993) is an Australian professional soccer player who plays as a defensive midfielder for NPL Western Australia club Olympic Kingsway.

== Early life ==
Born in Perth, Western Australia, Williams is the son of Audrey, who was born in an Anglo-Indian family from Mumbai, India and father Eric who was born in Kent, England. His maternal grandfather Lincoln "Linky" Grostate played for Bombay in the Santosh Trophy in the 1950s. Williams was brought up in a footballing family, with both older brother Rhys and twin brother Ryan having been professional footballers. The brothers all started their careers at ECU Joondalup before moving to England. On 4 February 2021, Williams signed for National League South side Havant & Waterlooville.

== Honours ==
Persebaya Surabaya

- Liga 1 runner-up: 2019
- East Java Governor Cup: 2020
