= Rhys Williams (soccer, born 1988) =

Australian association football player

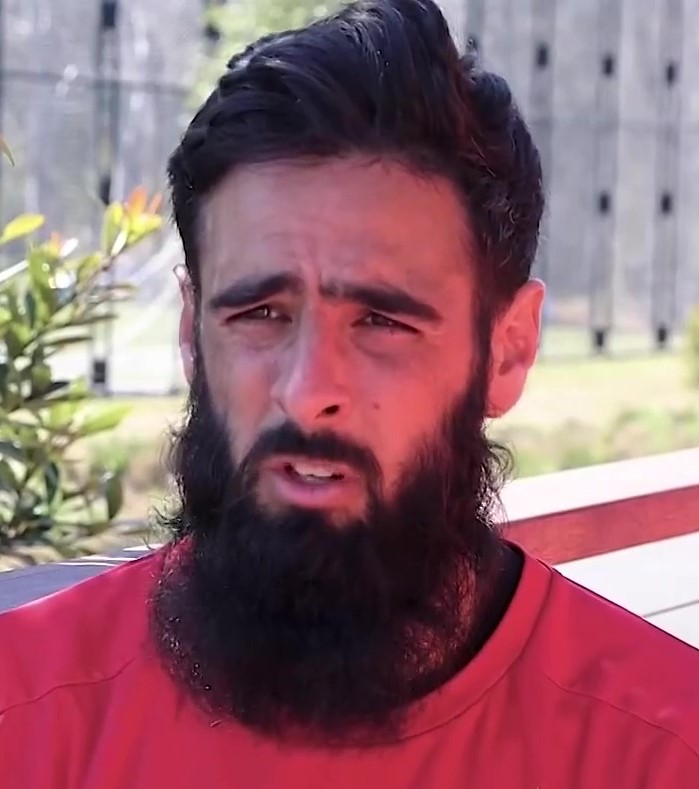
- Williams in 2021

Personal information
- Full name: Rhys Williams
- Date of birth: 14 July 1988 (age 38)
- Place of birth: Perth, Western Australia
- Height: 1.87 m (6 ft 2 in)
- Positions: Defender; midfielder

Youth career
- ECU Joondalup
- 2005–2007: Middlesbrough

Senior career*
Years	Team	Apps	(Gls)
2007–2016	Middlesbrough	125	(5)
2009	→ Burnley (loan)	16	(0)
2016	→ Charlton Athletic (loan)	3	(0)
2016–2017	Perth Glory	16	(0)
2017–2018	Melbourne Victory	25	(1)
2018–2021	Al-Qadsiah		
2021–2023	Western Sydney Wanderers	6	(0)

International career
2007–2009	Wales U21	10	(1)
2009–2013	Australia	14	(0)
- * Club domestic league appearances and goals

Rhys Williams (born 14 July 1988) is an Australian former professional soccer player who played for the Australia national team.

A versatile player, Williams was adept at playing as a centre back, defensive midfielder and right back but was played in virtually every out-field position at some point for Middlesbrough including more attacking roles. In August 2012, Williams was made club captain of Middlesbrough and Western Sydney Wanderers.

== Club career ==
=== Middlesbrough ===
He began his football career as a school boy at Woodvale Secondary College on a scholarship. Rhys was a promising junior with Perth-based club ECU Joondalup. As a youth player, 2004 would prove his breakthrough year with his club performances leading to selection in the Western Australian under-16 state representative squad for the 2004 National Talent Identification Championships. He impressed with three goals in the tournament, helping Western Australia reach the semi-finals. At the conclusion of the event, he travelled to England where he trialed with several clubs including Aston Villa, Leicester City, and Middlesbrough. Williams nearly joined semi-pro side Alvechurch, but the move collapsed over international clearance.

He ultimately signed a three-year deal with Premier League club Middlesbrough, playing academy football. In July 2007, he signed his first professional contract with the club, despite a number of injury setbacks which curtailed his football development.

In the 2008–09 season, Williams was promoted to the first team after he was impressed in the pre-season. Williams appeared in the first team for the first team when he appeared as an unused substitute. However, Williams suffered injury while on duty with Wales U21 after damaging lateral ligament that required a surgery to repair and was sidelined by the end of 2008.

On 30 January 2009, he signed a new two-year contract at Middlesbrough and signed on loan for Championship side Burnley on the same day. Williams made his Burnley debut the next day, playing 90 minutes, in a 2–1 win over Charlton Athletic. Williams then provided an assist for Martin Paterson to score the only goal in the game, in a 1–0 win over Sheffield United on 20 April 2009. He returned to Middlesbrough in early May after it was determined that he could not play in the Football League Championship play-offs for Burnley.

He scored 4 goals in 5 games in the 2009–10 pre-season, after which manager Gareth Southgate played him in central midfield in their opening Championship match against Sheffield United, and he went on to keep his place in the starting eleven for that season. On 26 September 2009, Williams scored his first goal for Middlesbrough in a 2–2 draw against Coventry City. Then on 26 December 2009, Williams scored his second goal for Middlesbrough in a 3–0 win over Scunthorpe United. However, Williams suffered a pelvic problem that kept him out for months. While on the sidelines, it was announced on 11 February 2010 that Williams signed a three-and-a-half-year contract extension with Middlesbrough. Williams then made his first team return on 6 March 2010, where he came on as a substitute for Willo Flood in the 52nd minute, in a 1–0 loss against Cardiff City. Two weeks later on 16 March 2010, Williams received a red card after a second bookable offence, in a 2–2 draw against Derby County. Williams later finished the 2009–10 season, scoring two times in thirty–two appearances and was awarded Young Player of the Year.

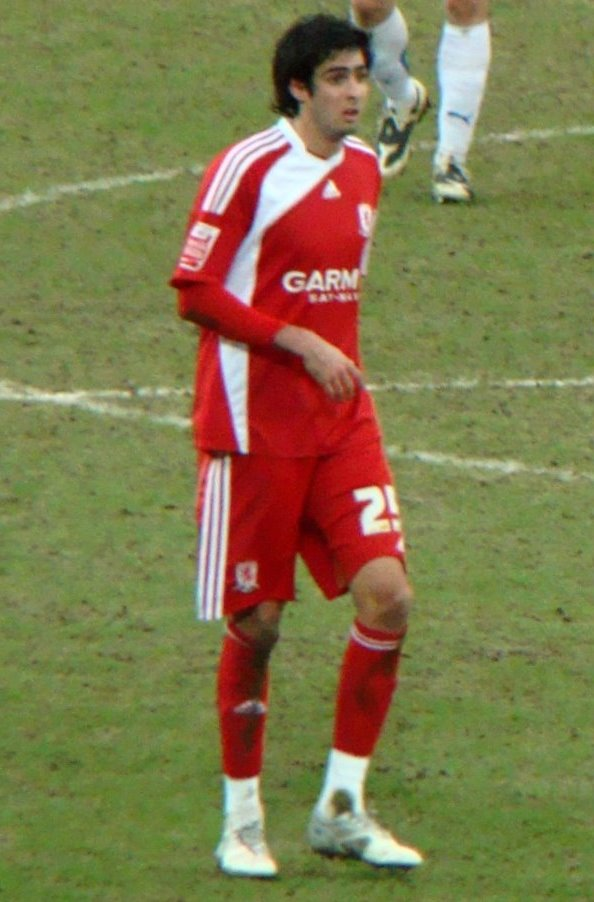
Williams playing for Middlesbrough in 2010

Williams missed most of the 2010–11 Middlesbrough season, and the 2010 World Cup with a persistent pelvic problem which saw him on an extensive rehabilitation period in Australia. After returning to training and playing in the reserve twice, Williams made his first Middlesbrough appearance of the season on 5 March 2011, where he played 30 minutes after coming on as a substitute, in a 5–2 loss against Reading. Four weeks later on 2 April 2011, Williams scored his first goal of the season, in a 3–3 draw against Leicester City. He made his eventual comeback to Middlesbrough towards the end of the 2010–11 League Championship season in which he earned an impressive six man of the match awards in only twelve games aiding Middlesbrough in their best run of the season.

In the 2011–12 season, Williams started the season well when he scored in the opening game of the season, in a 2–2 draw against Portsmouth and also during the match, Williams played against his younger brother, Ryan. After returning from an injury, Williams scored on his return, in a 2–2 draw against Derby County on 21 October 2011. For his performance, Williams was named in the Team of the Week. Due to strong performances since his return from injury, he was linked to several Premier League clubs in the lead up to the January 2012 transfer window including West Bromwich Albion and Liverpool. Despite speculation of a summer move, Williams penned a new four-year contract with the club, keeping him at the Riverside until 2016. Despite injury towards the end of the season, Williams went on to make thirty–five appearances for the club.

In the 2012–13 season, Rhys first earned the Captain's armband on 9 August 2012. Williams captained his first league match at Middlesbrough in the opening game of the season, in a 1–1 draw against Barnsley. Later in August Rhys suffered another injury blow. Unrelated to previous injuries, this time he suffered damage to his ankle ligaments which kept him on the sidelines for another four months until he made a late December 2012 return. After returning to training, Williams made his first team return against Blackburn Rovers on 26 December 2012 and played 45 minutes, which saw Middlesbrough won 1–0. Since making his return towards the end of the season, Williams regained his first team and captaincy, as he made twenty-three appearances.

For the 2013–14 season, Williams regained the captaincy at the start of the season, receiving a straight red card in the first match (a 3–3 draw against Bournemouth on 21 September 2013). Williams returned to the first team after serving a suspension, playing in a defensive position until tearing his achilles tendon against Wigan Athletic, which kept him out for the remainder of the season.

Williams was expected to recover from his achilles injury in time for the start of the 2014–15 season, but his return was delayed until the end of 2014. After returning to training in December, Williams' first appearance of the season came on 26 December 2014, where he came on as a late substitute, in a 3–0 win over Nottingham Forest. Williams then made his first start of the season in the third round of the FA Cup against Barnsley, but suffered an injury and was substituted after playing for five minutes. After the match, it was announced that Williams would be out for the rest of the season.

Williams commenced the 2015–16 season in the reserve team, playing his first match against Reading U21, which saw Middlesbrough U21 won 3–2. After the match, his return was praised by U21 Manager Graeme Lee on his attitude and performance. Williams made more appearances for Middlesbrough U21, including being captain against Chelsea U21. After returning from a loan spell at Charlton Athletic, Williams suffered a suspected cheekbone fractured during a match against Sunderland U21 and never played for Middlesbrough again.

On 2 January 2016, Williams was loaned to Charlton Athletic for a month. He made his debut in a 1–1 draw with Nottingham Forest, coming on as a substitute.

At the end of the 2015–16 season, Williams was released by Middlesbrough, ending his eleven years association with the club. Upon leaving the club, Williams thanked the club and the fans and said the Premier League promotion was a perfect ending, despite not getting a medal.

=== Perth Glory ===
On 20 April 2016, it was announced that Williams would return to Australia to join Perth Glory in the A-League for the 2016–17 A-League season.

=== Melbourne Victory ===
On 17 May 2017, Williams joined A-League club Melbourne Victory. Despite winning the championship in the 2017–18 season, he was one of the many players to be released from the squad, with his departure announced on 12 July 2018 after only one year of a two-year deal.

=== Al-Qadsiah ===
In July 2018, Williams joined Al-Qadsiah of the Saudi Professional League.

=== Western Sydney Wanderers ===
In July 2021, Williams returned to Australia, joining Western Sydney Wanderers on a two-year deal. He played only 6 A-League games for the Wanderers, as he suffered a severe ruptured hamstring tendon injury late in a 3-3 draw with Melbourne City. The surgery & rehabilitation required saw him miss the remainder of the season and the entire subsequent 2022/23 season. Williams retired from professional football at the end of the 2022–23 season.

== International career ==
Williams was in an unusual position as he was eligible to represent Australia, England, India, and Wales. In May 2009, he opted to represent Australia, the country of his birth, despite having made numerous appearances for the Wales national under-21 football team. He was also called up to the senior Wales squad.

Following this declaration, Williams earned his first call-up for Australia at senior level as part of an extended Socceroos squad for the June 2009 World Cup qualifiers. On 17 June 2009, he made his full Australian debut in a World Cup qualifier against Japan at the Melbourne Cricket Ground.

In May 2010 Williams was included in Australia's preliminary squad for the World Cup; however, he was not included in the final squad due to an injury sustained while playing for his club. Australia then Manager Pim Verbeek accused Middlesbrough for causing Williams' injury.

Williams returned to the Socceroos squad for the friendly against New Zealand on 5 June at Adelaide Oval which was won by Australia 3–0 and he came off the bench in the 0–0 draw on June against Serbia at Etihad Stadium. Williams played as a centre back in a friendly against France on 11 October 2013.

In October 2019, Williams retired from international soccer.

== Career statistics ==
=== Club ===
As of 30 April 2017

Club statistics
Club	Season	League			National Cup		League Cup		Other		Total	
Club	Season	Division	Apps	Goals	Apps	Goals	Apps	Goals	Apps	Goals	Apps	Goals
Middlesbrough	2009–10	Championship	32	2	1	0	1	0	–	–	34	2
Middlesbrough	2010–11	Championship	12	1	–	–	–	–	–	–	12	1
Middlesbrough	2011–12	Championship	35	2	3	0	2	0	–	–	40	2
Middlesbrough	2012–13	Championship	23	0	3	0	2	0	–	–	28	0
Middlesbrough	2013–14	Championship	22	0	1	0	1	0	–	–	24	0
Middlesbrough	2014–15	Championship	1	0	1	0	–	–	–	–	2	0
Middlesbrough	2015–16	Championship	0	0	0	0	0	0	0	0	0	0
Middlesbrough total			125	5	9	0	6	0	0	0	141	5
Burnley (loan)	2008–09	Championship	16	0	–	–	–	–	–	–	16	0
Charlton Athletic (loan)	2015–16	Championship	3	0	1	0	0	0	0	0	4	0
Perth Glory	2016–17	A-League	16	0	2	0	–	–	–	–	18	0
Melbourne Victory	2017–18	A-League	14	1	1	0	-	-	-	-	15	1
Career total			174	5	12	0	6	0	0	0	193	6

=== International ===
As of match played 19 November 2013.

International statistics
National team	Year	Apps	Goals
Australia	2009	3	0
Australia	2011	6	0
Australia	2012	1	0
Australia	2013	4	0
Total		14	0

== Honours ==
Melbourne Victory

- A-League: 2017–18

Individual

- PFA Team of the Year: 2017–18 A-League

== Personal life ==
His mother Audrey, was born in an Anglo-Indian family from Mumbai, India while his father was born in Kent, England. Williams is married. His maternal grandfather Lincoln "Linky" Grostate played for Bombay in the Santosh Trophy in the 1950s.

His younger twin brothers Ryan Williams and Aryn Williams are also footballers, with Ryan at Bengaluru and Aryn who plays for who plays for Olympic Kingsway in Perth.
