= Ashique Kuruniyan =

Indian footballer (born 1997)

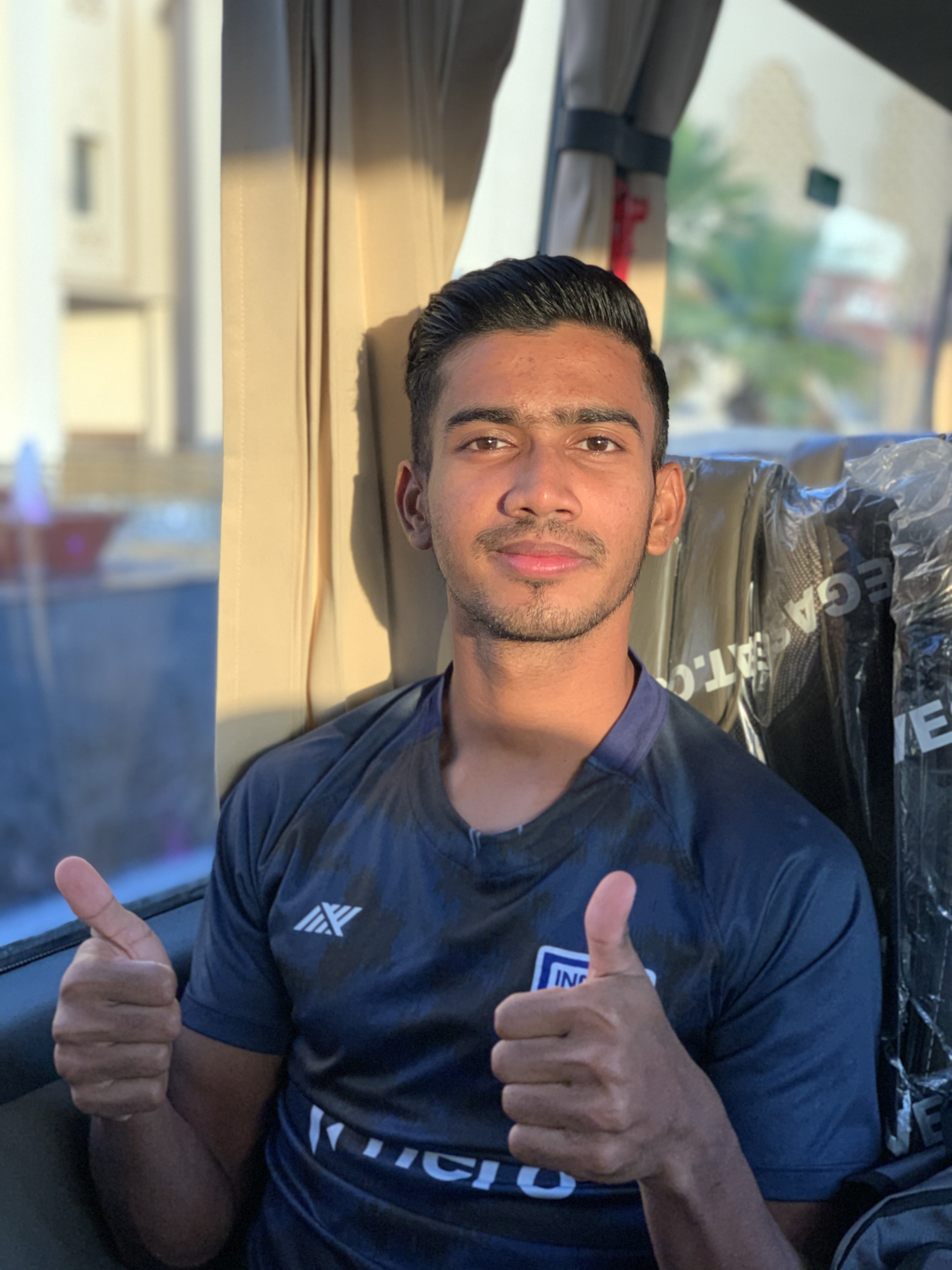
- Kuruniyan with the national team.

Personal information
- Full name: Muhammad Ashique Kuruniyan
- Date of birth: 14 June 1997 (age 29)
- Place of birth: Malappuram, Kerala, India
- Height: 1.78 m (5 ft 10 in)
- Positions: Winger; left-back

Team information
- Current team: Bengaluru

Youth career
- 2014–2016: Pune City

Senior career*
Years	Team	Apps	(Gls)
2017–2019	Pune City	26	(3)
2016–2017	→ Villarreal CF C (loan)	0	(0)
2019–2022	Bengaluru	39	(2)
2022–2025	Mohun Bagan	36	(0)
2025–	Bengaluru	10	(3)

International career^{‡}
2017–2018	India U20	0	(0)
2018–	India	45	(2)
Medal record
Representing India
SAFF Championship
Winner	2023 India
Runner-up	2018 Bangladesh
CAFA Nations Cup
Third place	2025 Tajikistan–Uzbekistan	Team
- * Club domestic league appearances and goals as of 18:00, 12 June 2025 (UTC) ‡ National team caps and goals as of 22:00, 6 October 2026 (UTC)

Muhammed Ashique Kuruniyan (born 14 June 1997) is an Indian professional footballer who plays as a forward or defender for Indian Super League club Bengaluru and the India national team.

== Club career ==
=== Early life and youth career ===
Born in Malappuram, Kerala, Kuruniyan was the fifth child to a father who owned a shop and a mother who was a housewife. In order to help support his family, Kuruniyan dropped out of school when he was in the eighth standard and began work in his father's sugarcane shop. When he finished his work in the evening, he would play football in the fields.

He was soon selected by Vision India, a scheme started by the Kerala Football Association, and was with the academy until 2014, when he joined the academy of then I-League club, Pune. He played a pivotal role in Pune finishing as runner-up in the 2014–15 I-League U19 season.

In 2016, when Pune FC's academy was sold and bought by Pune City, they rebranded the team into Pune City Academy, with whom Kuruniyan would join. In October 2016, it was announced that Kuruniyan would join La Liga side Villarreal on loan deal from Pune City, and would train with their third team – Villarreal CF C. However, in February 2017, Kuruniyan had to return to India due to suffering a hamstring injury ending his short four-month stint in Spain.

=== Pune City ===
In July 2017, it was confirmed that Kuruniyan had signed a professional contract with Pune City and was retained by the club for their upcoming Indian Super League campaign. He made his professional debut for the club on 10 December 2017 in their match against Jamshedpur. He came on as an 83rd-minute substitute for Emiliano Alfaro as Pune City won 1–0. He netted his first professional goal on 30 December, when he scored the first goal in the eighth minute of a 5–0 victory against NorthEast United.

He stayed at the club for the 2018–19 ISL season, and played his first match of the season on 3 October 2021 in a 1–1 draw against Delhi Dynamos (current Odisha). He scored his first goal of the season against Chennaiyin on 6 November, where Kuruniyan opened the scoresheet in the ninth minute, but eventually lost the match 2–4. Kuruniyan scored his second goal of the season and final goal for Pune City in the match against Jamshedpur on 16 February 2019, where he scored the last goal for Pune City, as they won the match on a large margin of 1–4. After the 2018–19 season, FC Pune City was disbanded, and Kuruniyan signed for Bengaluru.

=== Bengaluru ===
In August 2019, it was announced that Bengaluru had secured Kuruniyan under a four-year contract. He played his debut for the club against NorthEast United on 21 October 2019, which ended in a 0–0 tie. Bengaluru qualified for the knockout stages of the tournament and faced then ISL club ATK on both legs.

Kuruniyan scored his debut goal for Bengaluru in the second leg of the semi-final in the fifth minute of the match on 8 March 2020, which they lost 3–1. Bengaluru was knocked out of playoffs after ATK progressed with an aggregate score of 3–2. In between the regular season, Kuruniyan made his continental debut in first leg match in the 2020 AFC Cup preliminary stage on 5 February 2020 against Paro FC, which Bengaluru ended up winning 0–1.

Kuruniyan began his 2020–21 Indian Super League in the match against Goa on 22 November 2020, which was the club's first match of the season that ended in a dramatic 2–2 draw after a late FC Goa surge. During the match against Odisha FC on 17 December, Kuruniyan suffered a multiple fracture in his face after a foul caused by Odisha's Jerry Mawihmingthanga. He was immediately taken to hospital by ambulance. He was out for almost two months after undergoing a successful surgery and returned to the pitch with a protective face mask.

Kuruniyan returned to the pitch with a facemask in the match against Mumbai City on 15 February 2021, which ended in a 2–4 victory for Bengaluru. After the end of the regular season, Kuruniyan played his first continental match of the season in Bengaluru's 2021 AFC Cup Preliminary round 2 match against Nepal Army Club on 14 April, which ended 5–0 to Bengaluru.

He played his first match of the 2021–22 Indian Super League season against NorthEast United on 20 November 2021, which they won 4–2. He scored his first goal of the season against arch-rivals Kerala Blasters on 28 November, where in the same match he scored an own-goal, resulting in the match ending in a 1–1 draw. He scored another own-goal on 11 December in Bengaluru's 2–1 defeat over Goa.

=== Mohun Bagan ===
Kuruniyan moved to Mohun Bagan in 2022. He made his debut for the club on 20 August against Rajasthan United at the 131st edition of Durand Cup as his team lost the match by 3–2. Before the beginning of the 2023–24 ISL season, he was ruled out for the entire season due to ACL injury.

== International career ==
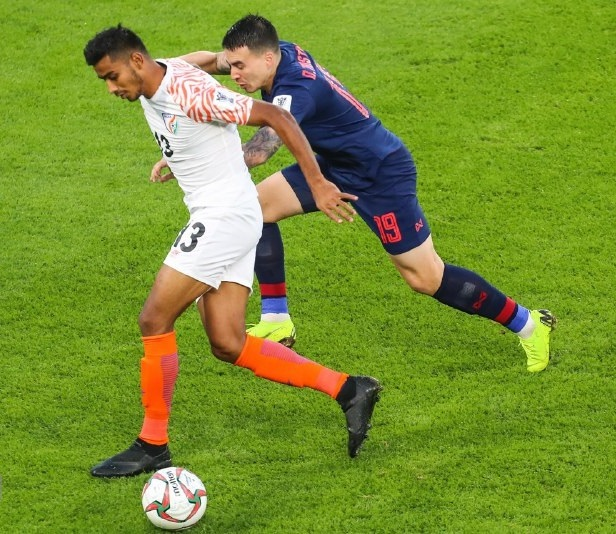
Kuruniyan in action against Thailand national football team in the 2019 AFC Asian Cup.

Kuruniyan have represented India in the under-18 and under-19 levels. He got his senior national team call-up, when he was selected for the Indian squad for the 2018 Intercontinental Cup following his standout performance in the 2017–18 ISL season.

He made his national debut in the opening match of the tournament against Chinese Taipei as a substitute for Halicharan Narzary on 1 June 2018, which ended in a staggering 5–0 victory for India.

He also played in the final of the 2018 Intercontinental Cup against Kenya as a substitute for Udanta Singh on 10 June 2018, which India won 2–0, thereby winning the first edition of the Intercontinental Cup and helping Kuruniyan to win his first international title

Kuruniyan was in the squad to travel to Bangladesh for the 2018 SAFF Championship. He scored his debut goal for the national team in the match against Sri Lanka on India's first match of the tournament on 5 September 2018, where scored the opening goal as India won the match 2–0 at full-time. He also featured in India's 2–1 defeat in the final against Maldives on 15 September.

Kuruniyan was a part of Indian squad to compete in the 2019 AFC Asian Cup. He played all three group stage matches, including India's opening match against Thailand on 6 January 2019, which India won 1–4, thereby witnessing India's first victory in the Asian Cup in 55 years, and also became a part of India's largest win in their Asian Cup history. He also played the do-or-die match on 14 January against Bahrain, which India lost 0–1 after Bahrain converted an injury time penalty into a goal, resulting in India's elimination from the tournament. Months later, India announced their squad for the 2022 FIFA World Cup qualifiers, where Kuruniyan was included. He played his first of the qualifiers against Oman on 5 September, which ended 1–2 to Oman.

== Style of play ==
Kuruniyan is a winger who can also play as a wing-back. He played as a left-back in the 2020–21 ISL season under Carles Cuadrat. He is widely appreciated for his pace and determination in the pitch by players and managers. He is also regarded for his versatility. Kuruniyan for a reason is considered as one of the future stars of Indian football.

== Personal life ==
Kuruniyan was born in Chungathara, Malappuram, Kerala on 14 June 1997. He married Aseela, a pharmacist from Malappuram, on 5 September 2020 amid the COVID-19 pandemic. He owns a football academy called the "AK22 Football Academy" in Malappuram.

== Career statistics ==
=== Club ===
As of 1 June 2025

Club	Season	League			Cup (Note: Includes Super Cup)		Continental		Other		Total	
Club	Season	Division	Apps	Goals	Apps	Goals	Apps	Goals	Apps	Goals	Apps	Goals
Pune City	2017–18	Indian Super League	9	1	1	0	—		—		10	1
Pune City	2018–19	Indian Super League	17	2	0	0	—		—		17	2
Pune City	Total		26	3	1	0	0	0	—		27	3
Villarreal CF C (loan)	2016–17	Tercera División	0	0	–		–		–		0	0
Bengaluru	2019–20	Indian Super League	18	1	0	0	3 (Note: Appearance(s) in AFC Cup)	0	—		21	1
Bengaluru	2020–21	Indian Super League	8	0	0	0	2	0	—		10	0
Bengaluru	2021–22	Indian Super League	13	1	0	0	—		—		13	1
Bengaluru	Total		39	2	0	0	5	0	—		44	2
Mohun Bagan	2022–23	Indian Super League	18	0	2	0	1	0	4 (Note: Three Appearances in Durand Cup, one appearance in Indian club qualifiers for 2023–24 AFC competitions)	1	25	1
Mohun Bagan	2023–24	Indian Super League	0	0	0	0	2	0	4 (Note: Appearance(s) in Durand Cup)	0	6	0
Mohun Bagan	2024–25	Indian Super League	18	0	2	0	0	0	1	0	21	0
Mohun Bagan	Total		36	0	4	0	3	0	9	1	52	1
Bengaluru	2025–26	Indian Super League	10	3	3	0	–		0	0	13	3
Career total			111	8	8	0	8	0	9	1	136	9

=== International ===
As of 6 October 2026

National team	Year	Apps	Goals
India	2018	9	1
India	2019	7	0
India	2021	5	0
India	2022	6	1
India	2023	7	0
India	2024	0	0
India	2025	7	0
India	2026	4	0
Total		45	2

==== International goals ====
Scores and results list India's goal tally first.

No.	Date	Venue	Cap	Opponent	Score	Result	Competition	Ref.
1.	5 September 2018	Bangabandhu National Stadium, Dhaka, Bangladesh	5	Sri Lanka	1–0	2–0	2018 SAFF Championship	
2.	24 September 2022	Thống Nhất Stadium, Ho Chi Minh City, Vietnam	26	Singapore	1–1	1–1	2022 VFF Tri-Nations Series	

== Honours ==
India

- SAFF Championship: 2023
- Intercontinental Cup: 2018, 2023

Mohun Bagan

- Indian Super League Shield: 2024–25
- ISL Cup: 2022–23, 2024–25
- Durand Cup: 2023

== See also ==
- List of Indian expatriate footballers
