= Vinith Venkatesh =

Indian footballer

Personal information
- Full name: Vinith Venkatesh
- Date of birth: 31 July 2005 (age 21)
- Place of birth: Bengaluru, Karnataka, India
- Height: 1.80 m (5 ft 11 in)
- Position: Midfielder

Team information
- Current team: Bengaluru
- Number: 32

Youth career
- 2013–2023: Bengaluru

Senior career*
| Years | Team | Apps | (Gls) |
| 2023–2024 | Bengaluru B | 11 | (0) |
| 2024– | Bengaluru | 19 | (1) |

International career^{‡}
| 2025– | India U23 | 2 | (0) |
- * Club domestic league appearances and goals as of 21:30, 14 September 2024 (UTC) ‡ National team caps and goals as of August 2025

Vinith Venkatesh (born 31 July 2005) is an Indian professional footballer who plays as a midfielder for Indian Super League club Bengaluru.

== Club career ==
Promoted through Bengaluru FC youth system, he made his senior debut in The 2024 Durand Cup.He Scored a goal against Mohun Bagan in the Semi-Final Match Which Bengaluru Lost on Penalties.Vinith made his debut in ISL against East Bengal on 14 September 2024 and scored the winning goal in the game. Vinith won the ISL Emerging Player of the month for September.

== Career statistics ==
=== Club ===
As of 1 June 2025

| Club | Season | League | | | Cup | | Continental | | Other | | Total | |
| Club | Season | Division | Apps | Goals | Apps | Goals | Apps | Goals | Apps | Goals | Apps | Goals |
|---|---|---|---|---|---|---|---|---|---|---|---|---|
| Bengaluru B | 2022–23 | Reliance Foundation Development League | 2 | 0 | | | | | | | 2 | 0 |
| Bengaluru B | 2023–24 | Reliance Foundation Development League | 5 | 0 | | | | | | | 5 | 0 |
| Bengaluru | 2024–25 | Indian Super League | 19 | 1 | 1 (Note: Appearance(s) in Super Cup) | 0 | 0 (Note: Appearance(s) in AFC Cup) | 0 | 3 (Note: Appearance(s) in Durand Cup) | 2 | 4 | 3 |
| Career total | | | 26 | 1 | 1 | 0 | 0 | 0 | 3 | 0 | 30 | 3 |
