= Harsh Patre =

Indian footballer (born 2003)

Personal information
- Full name: Harsh Shailesh Patre
- Date of birth: 25 January 2003 (age 23)
- Place of birth: Bicholim, Goa, India
- Height: 1.77 m (5 ft 10 in)
- Position: Central midfielder

Team information
- Current team: Goa

Youth career
- GFDC Academy
- Churchill Brothers B
- AIFF Academy

Senior career*
Years	Team	Apps	(Gls)
2021–2022	Indian Arrows	25	(3)
2023–2024	Bengaluru B	4	(0)
2023–2025	Bengaluru	21	(1)
2025–	Goa	0	(0)

International career
2018	India U17		
2022–	India U20		
- * Club domestic league appearances and goals as of 12:00, 2 April 2025 (UTC)

Harsh Shailesh Patre (born 25 January 2003) is an Indian professional footballer who plays as a midfielder for Indian Super League club Goa. He has also played for India at the youth level internationally.

== Career ==
Harsh Patre made his first professional appearance for Indian Arrows on 10 January 2021 against Churchill Brothers.

=== Bengaluru ===
On 23 February 2023, Bengaluru announced the signing of Patre on a two-year deal. On 14 August, he made his debut for the club against Indian Air Force in a 1–1 draw during the Durand Cup. On 21 September 2023, he made this Indian Super League debut, coming on as a substitute in the 77th minute during the season opener against Kerala Blasters.

On 30 November 2023, Patre scored his first goal for the club, in a 3–3 draw against Punjab.

=== FC Goa ===
On 17 July 2025, Goa announced the signing of Patre, marking a homecoming for the midfielder as he returned to represent his home state.

== Career statistics ==
=== Club ===
As of 2 April 2025

Club	Season	League			National Cup		League Cup		AFC		Total	
Club	Season	Division	Apps	Goals	Apps	Goals	Apps	Goals	Apps	Goals	Apps	Goals
Indian Arrows	2020–21	I-League	12	3	—		—		—		12	3
Indian Arrows	2021–22	I-League	13	0	—		2 (Note: Appearance(s) in IFA Shield)	0	—		15	0
Indian Arrows	Total		25	3	0	0	2	0	0	0	27	3
Bengaluru B	2022–23	I-League 2nd Division	4	0	—		—		—		4	0
Bengaluru	2023–24	Indian Super League	16	1	3 (Note: Appearance(s) in Super Cup)	0	3 (Note: Appearance(s) in Durand Cup)	0	—		22	1
Bengaluru	2024–25	Indian Super League	5	0	0	0	1	0	—		6	0
Bengaluru	Total		21	1	3	0	4	0	0	0	28	1
Goa	2025–26	Indian Super League	0	0	0	0	—		—		0	0
Career total			50	4	3	0	6	0	0	0	59	4

== Honours ==
India U20

- SAFF U-20 Championship: 2022
