= Pedro Capó (footballer) =

Spanish footballer

Personal information
- Full name: Pedro Luis Capó Payeras
- Date of birth: 11 December 1990 (age 35)
- Place of birth: Mahón, Spain
- Height: 1.87 m (6 ft 2 in)
- Positions: Centre-back; midfielder

Team information
- Current team: Talavera de la Reina
- Number: 18

Youth career
- 2000–2004: La Salle Mahón
- 2004–2006: Atlético Villacarlos
- 2006–2009: Penya Ciutadella

Senior career*
Years	Team	Apps	(Gls)
2009–2011	Sporting Mahonés	62	(2)
2011–2012	Celta B	24	(0)
2012–2013	Mallorca B	38	(3)
2013–2014	Atlético Baleares	33	(5)
2014–2015	Arroyo	29	(0)
2015	Llosetense	15	(0)
2016–2017	Leioa	53	(5)
2017–2021	Sabadell	86	(4)
2021–2024	Eldense	83	(3)
2024–2025	Bengaluru	21	(0)
2025–	Talavera de la Reina	19	(0)
- * Club domestic league appearances and goals as of 10 June 2026

Pedro Luis Capó Payeras (born 11 December 1990) is a Spanish footballer who plays as either a central defender or a central midfielder for Primera Federación club Talavera de la Reina.

== Club career ==
Born in Mahón, Menorca, Balearic Islands, Capó finished his formation with Penya Ciutadella. On 22 June 2009, he joined Segunda División B side CF Sporting Mahonés, and made his senior debut during the campaign.

Capó continued to appear in the third division in the following years, representing Celta de Vigo B, RCD Mallorca B, CD Atlético Baleares, Arroyo CP, CD Llosetense, SD Leioa and CE Sabadell FC. With the latter side he achieved promotion to Segunda División in 2020, and renewed his contract for a further year on 4 August of that year.

Capó made his professional debut at the age of 29 on 25 October 2020, starting in a 0–0 away draw against Real Zaragoza. He left the club after their relegation, and signed for Segunda División RFEF side CD Eldense on 1 September 2021.

== Honours ==
Bengaluru FC

- ISL Cup runner-up: 2024–25
