= List of Odisha FC records and statistics =

Odisha Football Club is an Indian professional football club based in Bhubaneswar, Odisha. The club was founded as Odisha FC in 2019. Odisha currently plays in the Indian Super League, the premier football league in India.

All statistics are accurate as of the final match of the 2025–26 Indian Super League season, played on 21 May 2026.

== Overview ==
As of 4 May 2026

Season	Indian Super League									AIFF Super Cup	Top Scorer	
Season	P	W	D	L	GF	GA	Pts	Position	Playoffs	AIFF Super Cup	Player	Goals
Delhi Dynamos
2014	14	4	6	4	16	14	18	5th	—	—	(Brazil) Gustavo Marmentini	5
2015	14	6	4	4	15	11	20	4th	Semi-finals	—	(Ghana) Richard Gadze (India) Robin Singh	4
2016	14	5	6	3	27	17	21	3rd	Semi-finals	—	(Brazil) Marcelinho	10
2017–18	18	5	4	9	27	37	19	8th	—	Qualifiers	(Nigeria) Kalu Uche	14
2018–19	18	4	6	8	23	27	18	8th	—	Quarter-finals	(India) Daniel Lalhlimpuia (India) Lallianzuala Chhangte	5
Odisha
2019–20	18	7	4	7	28	31	25	6th	—	—	(Spain) Aridane Santana	9
2020–21	20	2	6	12	25	44	12	11th	—	—	(Brazil) Diego Maurício	12
2021–22	20	6	5	9	31	43	23	7th	—	—	(Brazil) Jonathas de Jesus	8
2022–23	20	9	3	8	30	32	30	6th	Knockouts	Champions	(Brazil) Diego Maurício	22
2023–24	22	11	6	5	35	23	39	4th	Semi-finals	Runners-up	(Brazil) Diego Maurício	17
2024–25	24	8	9	7	44	37	33	7th	—	Round of 16	(Brazil) Diego Maurício	9
2025–26	13	2	5	6	14	22	11	11th	—	—	(India) Suhair Vadakkepeedika	4

== Head Coaches ==
As of 21 May 2026

Name	Nationality	From	To	P	W	D	L	GF	GA	Win%
Delhi Dynamos FC
Harm van Veldhoven	Netherlands	August 2014	December 2014	14	4	6	4	16	14	28.57%
Roberto Carlos	Brazil	July 2015	December 2015	16	7	4	5	19	23	43.75%
Gianluca Zambrotta	Italy	July 2016	December 2016	16	6	6	4	29	19	37.50%
Miguel Ángel Portugal	Spain	July 2017	May 2018	18	5	4	9	16	30	27.77%
Josep Gombau	Spain	July 2018	May 2019	18	4	6	8	23	27	22.22%
Odisha
Josep Gombau	Spain	August 2019	March 2020	18	7	4	7	28	31	38.88%
Stuart Baxter	Scotland	June 2020	February 2021	14	1	5	8	13	21	07.14%
Gerry Peyton (interim)	Ireland	February 2021	February 2021	4	0	1	3	5	12	00.00%
Steven Dias (interim)	India	February 2021	May 2021	2	1	0	1	7	11	50.00%
Kiko Ramírez	Spain	July 2021	January 2022	10	4	1	5	18	24	40.00%
Joaquin Garcia Sanchez (interim)	Spain	January 2022	May 2022	10	2	4	4	13	19	20.00%
Josep Gombau	Spain	June 2022	March 2023	26	13	3	10	97	98	50.00%
Clifford Miranda	India	April 2023	May 2023	6	5	1	0	14	4	83.33%
Sergio Lobera	Spain	May 2023	November 2025	61	29	15	17	108	85	47.54%
T. G. Purushothaman	India	February 2026	May 2026	13	2	5	6	14	22	15.38%

== General ==
Note: When scores are mentioned, score of Odisha are given first.

- First match: 1–2 (vs Jamshedpur, Indian Super League, 22 October 2019)
- First win: 4–2 (vs Mumbai City, Indian Super League, 31 October 2019)
- First goalscorer: (Spain) Aridane Santana (vs Jamshedpur, Indian Super League, 22 October 2019)
- First Indian goalscorer: (India) Jerry Mawihmingthanga (vs Mumbai City, Indian Super League, 31 October 2019)
- First goal at home ground: (Spain) Carlos Delgado (vs Hyderabad, Indian Super League, 11 December 2019)
- Biggest win in the Indian Super League: 6–0 (vs Hyderabad, 25 November 2024)
- Biggest defeat in the Indian Super League: 1–6 (vs Mumbai City, 24 February 2021); 1–6 (vs Hyderabad, 28 December 2021)
- Longest unbeaten run in the Indian Super League: 13 matches, during the 2023–24 season.
- Highest finish in the Indian Super League: 4th (2023–24).
- Most points in an Indian Super League season: 39 (2023–24).
- Most goals in an Indian Super League season: 44 (2024–25).
- Unbeaten home league campaign: 2023–24, with eight wins and three draws.
- First major trophy: 2023 Super Cup, won 2–1 against Bengaluru FC.
- First AFC club competition: 2023–24 AFC Cup, in which Odisha reached the Inter-Zone semi-finals after finishing top of their group.

== Club Captains ==
Season(s)	Name
2019–20	(Spain) Marcos Tébar
2020–21	(England) Steven Taylor
2021–22	(Spain) Héctor Rodas
2022–23	(Spain) Carlos Delgado
2023–24	(India) Amrinder Singh
2024–25	(India) Amrinder Singh
2025–26	(Spain) Carlos Delgado

== Most Appearances ==
- Record appearance maker: 131 – (India) Jerry Mawihmingthanga.
- Most appearances in the Indian Super League: 112 – (India) Jerry Mawihmingthanga.
- Most appearances for Odisha FC by a foreign player: 114 – (Spain) Carlos Delgado.

Rank	Player	Indian Super League	Others	Total
1	(India) Jerry Mawihmingthanga	112	19	131
2	(Spain) Carlos Delgado	91	23	114
3	(Brazil) Diego Maurício	86	25	111
4	(India) Thoiba Singh Moirangthem	83	14	97
5	(India) Nandhakumar Sekar	82	15	97
6	(India) Isak Vanlalruatfela	72	22	94
7	(India) Amrinder Singh	77	14	91
8	(India) Lalthathanga Khawlhring	58	13	71
9	(India) Vinit Rai	68	2	70
10	(India) Amey Ranawade	46	13	59

== Most Goals ==
- All-time top scorer: 60 – (Brazil) Diego Maurício.
- Most goals in the Indian Super League: 44 – Diego Maurício.
- Most goals in a season: 22 – Diego Maurício, 2022–23, across competitions.
- Most goals in an Indian Super League season: 12 – Diego Maurício, 2020–21 and 2022–23.
- Most goals in a match: 3 – (Spain) Manuel Onwu (vs Kerala Blasters, Indian Super League, 23 February 2020)

Rank	Player	Indian Super League	Others	Total
1	(Brazil) Diego Maurício	44	16	60
2	(India) Jerry Mawihmingthanga	17	3	20
3	(Fiji) Roy Krishna	15	3	18
4	(India) Nandhakumar Sekar	10	6	16
5	(India) Isak Vanlalruatfela	10	4	14

Note: Diego Maurício's official Odisha FC total is 60 goals in 111 appearances across all competitions, including 44 goals in 86 ISL appearances.

== Hat-tricks ==
Player	Against	Total Goals	Final score	Date
(Brazil) Marcelinho	Goa	3	5–1	27 November 2016 (2016–17 season)
(Spain) Manuel Onwu	Kerala Blasters	3	4–4	10 January 2020 (2019–20 season)
(Brazil) Diego Maurício	Gokulam Kerala	3	3–1	29 April 2023 (Play–off for AFC Cup)

== Most Assists ==
Rank	Player	Indian Super League	Others	Total
1	(Brazil) Diego Maurício	13	6	19
2	(India) Jerry Mawihmingthanga	16	3	19
3	(Morocco) Ahmed Jahouh	8	8	16
4	(India) Nandhakumar Sekar	11	3	14
5	(India) Isak Vanlalruatfela	10	2	12

== Most Clean Sheets ==
- (India) Amrinder Singh recorded 9 clean sheets during the 2023–24 ISL season, during which Odisha FC remained unbeaten at home.

== Women's team records ==
Odisha FC Women won the 2023–24 Indian Women's League, finishing with 31 points from 12 matches and two points ahead of Gokulam Kerala FC. They secured the title with a 6–0 victory over Kickstart FC in their final match. Odisha FCW earned first-ever AFC Women's Champions League group-stage qualification, after winning both the preliminary-stage matches of the 2024–25 edition.

- IWL champions: 2023–24.
- IWL points: 31 from 12 matches, 2023–24.
- Best IWL Goalkeeper: (India) Shreya Hooda, 2023–24.
- Best IWL Midfielder: (India) Indumathi Kathiresan, 2023–24.

== See also ==
- Odisha FC
- 2019–20 Odisha FC season
- Indian Super League
- Football in India
