= 2022–23 Odisha FC season =

Odisha
2022–23 season
- Owner: GMS Inc.
- President: Raj Athwal
- Head coach: Josep Gombau (until 11 March); Clifford Miranda (interim, from 16 March)
- Stadium: Kalinga Stadium
- Indian Super League: 6th
- ISL Play-offs: Knockout
- Super Cup: Champions
- Durand Cup: Quarter-finals
- Top goalscorer: League: Diego Maurício (12); All: Diego Maurício (22)
- Highest home attendance: 7,716 (vs NorthEast United, 2 December 2022)
- Lowest home attendance: 4,417 (vs Mumbai City, 2 January 2023)
- Average home league attendance: 6,383
Home colours	Away colours	Third colours

The 2022–23 season was Odisha Football Clubs's fourth professional season in the Indian Super League since their establishment in 2019. Odisha finished 6th in the Indian Super League regular season table and lost to ATK Mogun Bagan in the play-off knockout. The club won the Super Cup for the first time in their history and were knocked out of Durand Cup in the quarter-finals.

== Overview ==
=== Pre-season and Durand Cup ===
Odisha FC brought back head coach Josep Gombau who enjoyed an excellent two-year spell at the club on 8 June. He started to rebuild the team by bringing a new set of players. He stated that the team composition and their play would be different, so they wanted new players. He also confirmed that they retain no foreign players from last season. On 1 July, They announced the launch of Odisha FC Women team.

Odisha made their Durand Cup debut in Group D. They won their first game with 6 goals against NorthEast United. Odisha defeated Kerala Blasters, Sudeva Delhi and Army Green in their remaining group matches without conceding a single goal. But in the quarter-finals, they lost against Bengaluru, who later won the tournament.

=== Indian Super League ===
Odisha was handed an away fixture in their first match, facing defending premiers Jamshedpur. Odisha won the game 3–2. But in next match Mumbai City FC notched a 2–0 win over them in a tightly contested affair with a Shubham Sarangi own goal and a Bipin Singh late strike. In their first home match, Odisha FC made another stunning comeback to register second win of the season. After the first half Kerala Blasters was leading with a goal, but in the second half Jerry Mawihmingthanga equalised and substitute Pedro Martín won it for the Juggernauts. In next match they picked their second home win as well by beating Bengaluru FC. Nandhakumar Sekar scored the game's only goal. But an early goal sink them to their second defeat of the season against Hyderabad FC. Then they nabbed three consecutive wins against East Bengal, Chennaiyin and NorthEast united. But in the next match, The Juggernauts were reduced to ten men in the 65th minute when Nandhakumar Sekar was shown a second yellow and FC Goa made the visitors pay with all three goals coming after. In the next match, Odisha FC and ATK Mohun Bagan shared the points in the season's first goalless draw to complete Odisha's first half of the season with six wins and one draw.

== Competitions ==
=== Indian Super League ===
==== League table ====
Pos	Team	Pld	W	D	L	GF	GA	GD	Pts	Qualification
4	Bengaluru	20	11	1	8	27	23	+4	34 (Note: Head-to-head points: ATK Mohun Bagan 3, Bengaluru 3. Head-to-head goal difference: ATK Mohun Bagan 0, Bengaluru 0. Head-to-head goal scored: ATK Mohun Bagan 4, Bengaluru 4. Goal difference: ATK Mohun Bagan +7, Bengaluru +4.)	ISL Cup Knockouts
5	Kerala Blasters	20	10	1	9	28	28	0	31	ISL Cup Knockouts
6	Odisha	20	9	3	8	30	32	−2	30	ISL Cup Knockouts, Playoffs for 2023–24 AFC Cup group stage (Note: Qualified via winning the 2023 Super Cup) and 2023–24 AFC Cup group stage (Note: Qualified via winning the Indian club qualifiers for 2023–24 AFC competitions)
7	Goa	20	8	3	9	36	35	+1	27 (Note: Head-to-head points: Goa 3, Chennaiyin 3. Head-to-head goal difference: Goa +1, Chennaiyin -1.)	
8	Chennaiyin	20	7	6	7	36	37	−1	27	

Source: Indian Super League
Rules for classification: 1) points; 2) head-to-head points; 3) head-to-head goal difference; 4) head-to-head goals scored; 5) goal difference; 6) number of goals scored; 7) fair play ranking; 8) drawing of lots

==== League stage ====
Date	Gameweek	Opponent	Venue	Result (Note: Odisha FC's score written first)	Scorers	Attendance	Referee
11 October 2022	1	Jamshedpur	Away	3-2	Maurício (2), Isaac	19,213	A Rowan
15 October 2022	2	Mumbai City	Away	0-2		4,128	Pranjal Banerjee
23 October 2022	3	Kerala Blasters	Home	2-1	Jerry, Pedro	5,217	A Rowan
27 October 2022	4	Bengaluru	Home	1-0	Nandha	6,811	Senthil Nathan S
5 November 2022	5	Hyderabad	Away	0-1		10,126	R Venkatesh
18 November 2022	6	East Bengal	Away	4-2	Pedro (2), Jerry, Nandha	17,772	I Jamal Mohamed
24 November 2022	7	Chennaiyin	Home	3-2	Maurício, Nandha, Vafa (o.g.)	7,218	Aditya Purkayastha
2 December 2022	8	NorthEast United	Home	2-1	Nandha, Jerry	7,716	Umesh Bora
10 December 2022	9	Goa	Away	0-3		9,456	Crystal John
15 December 2022	10	ATK Mohun Bagan	Home	0-0		7,019	C. R. Srikrishna
26 December 2022	11	Kerala Blasters	Away	0-1		31,712	Pratik Mondal
2 January 2023	12	Mumbai City	Home	2-4	Maurício (2)	4,417	A Rowan
7 January 2023	13	East Bengal	Home	3-1	Maurício (2), Sekar		
14 January 2023	14	Bengaluru	Away	3-1	Maurício		
28 December 2022	15	ATK Mohun Bagan	Away	0-2			
2 February 2023	16	Chennaiyin	Away	2-2	Maurício, Vanlalruatfela		
6 February 2023	17	Goa	Home	1-1	Maurício		
10 February 2023	18	Hyderabad	Home	3-1	Maurício, Tanang (o.g.), Vanlalruatfela		
17 February 2023	19	Northeast United	Away	3-1	Maurício, Rodríguez, Sekar		
22 February 2023	20	Jamshedpur	Home	0-2			
6 March 2023	Knockout	ATK Mohun Bagan	Away	0-2		35,256	Rahul Kumar Gupta

==== Results by round ====
Team ╲ Round	1	2	3	4	5	6	7	8	9	10	11	12	13	14	15	16	17	18	19	20
Odisha	W	L	W	W	L	W	W	W	L	D	L	L	W	L	L	D	D	W	W	L

Updated to match(es) played on 26 February 2023. Source: Indian Super League
W = Win; D = Draw; L = Lose

=== Super Cup ===
Date	Round	Opponent	Result	Scorers	Referee
9 April 2023	Group Stage	East Bengal	1-1	Sekar	Rahul Kumar Gupta
13 April 2023	Group Stage	Aizawl	3-0	Maurício, Rodríguez, Sekar	Aniket Jadhav
17 April 2023	Group Stage	Hyderabad	2-1	Maurício, Panwar	Pranjal Banerjee
17 April 2023	Semi Final	Northeast United	3-1	Sekar(2), Maurício	Senthil Nathan S
25 April 2023	Final	Bengaluru	2-1	Maurício (2)	Rahul Kumar Gupta

=== Durand Cup ===
Date	Round	Opponent	Result	Scorers	Referee
17 August 2022	Group Stage	NorthEast United	6-0	Jerry (2), Nandha, Isak, Maurício, Thoiba	Pranjal Banerjee
23 August 2022	Group Stage	Kerala Blasters	2-0	Isaac, Saúl	Ashwin Kanojiya
29 August 2022	Group Stage	Sudeva Delhi	3-0	Saúl (2), Jerry	Dipu Roy
4 September 2022	Group Stage	Army Green	1-0	Pedro	Pranjal Banerjee
10 September 2022	Quarter-finals	Bengaluru	1-2 (a.e.t)	Maurício	Dipu Roy

=== AFC Cup ===
Since the 2023–24 AFC Champions League and the 2023–24 AFC Cup adopted transitional calendar with the switch from Spring-to-Autumn to an Autumn-to-Spring schedule, the All India Football Federation decided that its continental slots are determined by extra playoffs.

Date	Round	Opponent	Result	Scorers	Referee
29 April 2023	Play–off for AFC Cup	Gokulam Kerala	3-1	Maurício (3)	Tejas Visvasrao Nagvenkar

== Transfers ==
Josep Gombau after being signed as the head coach stated that the team composition, and how they play, all will be different so they wanted new players. They didn't retain any foreign players. Signed 4 players from Spanish teams, Osama Malik from an Australian club Perth Glory and Diego Maurício returned from Mumbai City. Even though Kamaljit Singh has signed an extension, he later transferred to East Bengal. They signed 15 players in total, transferred 17 players out and retained 17 players from last season. Vinit Rai continued on loan in Mumbai City.

=== Transfers In ===
Date	Name	Position	No.	Last Club	Fee
30 August 2022	(India) Niraj Kumar	GK	13	(India) Rajasthan United	Undisclosed
1 June 2022	(India) Rishabh Dobriyal	FW	37	(India) Sudeva Delhi	Free
9 June 2022	(India) Michael Soosairaj	FW	23	(India) ATK Mohun Bagan	Undisclosed
9 June 2022	(India) Narender Gahlot	DF	3	(India) Jamshedpur	Free
9 June 2022	(India) Nikhil Prabhu	DF	4	(India) Hyderabad	Undisclosed
19 June 2022	(Spain) Carlos Delgado	DF	5	(Spain) Atlético Baleares	Free
20 June 2022	(Australia) Osama Malik	MF	6	(Australia) Perth Glory	Free
26 June 2022	(India) Raynier Fernandes	MF	10	(India) Mumbai City	Loan
1 July 2022	(Brazil) Diego Maurício	FW	9	(India) Mumbai City	Free
6 July 2022	(India) Denechandra Meitei	DF	30	(India) Kerala Blasters	Loan
7 July 2022	(Spain) Saúl Crespo	MF	21	(Spain) Ponferradina	Free
8 July 2022	(Spain) Pedro Martín	FW	7	(Spain) Gimnàstic	Free
10 July 2022	(India) Lalthuammawia Ralte	GK	28	(India) RoundGlass Punjab	Free
12 July 2022	(Spain) Víctor Rodríguez	FW	32	(Spain) Elche	Free
16 September 2022	(India) Amrinder Singh	GK	1	(India) ATK Mohun Bagan	Free

=== Transfers Out ===
Date	Name	To	Fee
22 June 2022	(India) Ankit Bhuyan	Free agent	
22 June 2022	(Spain) Javi Hernández	(India) Bengaluru	Free
30 June 2022	(India) Arshdeep Singh	(India) Goa	Free
1 July 2022	(India) Baoringdao Bodo	(India) TRAU	Free
1 July 2022	(Spain) Aridai Cabrera	(Andorra) Inter Club d'Escaldes	Free
13 July 2022	(Spain) Víctor Mongil	(India) Kerala Blasters	Free
15 July 2022	(Brazil) Jonathas de Jesus	(Brazil) Náutico	Free
31 July 2022	(India) Premjit Singh	(India) TRAU	Free
22 July 2022	(Spain) Héctor Rodas	(Spain) Atlético Saguntino	Free
1 August 2022	(India) Saurabh Meher	(India) Gokulam Kerala	Undisclosed
11 August 2022	(India) Kamaljit Singh	(India) East Bengal	Undisclosed
25 August 2022	(India) Gaurav Bora	(India) NorthEast United	Free
6 September 2022	(India) Ravi Kumar	(India) RoundGlass Punjab	Free
7 September 2022	(India) George D'Souza	(India) Churchill Brothers	Free
9 September 2022	(India) Samuel Lalmuanpuia	(India) RoundGlass Punjab	Free
13 September 2022	(India) Daniel Lalhlimpuia	(India) RoundGlass Punjab	Free
17 September 2022	(India) Kamalpreet Singh	(India) Real Kashmir	Free

== Statistics ==
=== Appearances and goals ===
No.	Pos	Nat	Player	Total		Indian Super League		Durand Cup	
No.	Pos	Nat	Player	Apps	Goals	Apps	Goals	Apps	Goals
1	GK	(India) IND	Amrinder Singh	12	0	12	0	0	0
13	GK	(India) IND	Niraj Kumar	0	0	0	0	0	0
28	GK	(India) IND	Lalthuammawia Ralte	3	0	0	0	3	0
31	GK	(India) IND	Antonio D'Silva (Note: Not included in the ISL squad)	2	0	0	0	2	0
2	DF	(India) IND	Lalhrezuala Sailung	0	0	0	0	0	0
3	DF	(India) IND	Narender Gahlot	14	0	9	0	5	0
4	DF	(India) IND	Nikhil Prabhu	3	0	2	0	1	0
5	DF	(Spain) ESP	Carlos Delgado	16	0	12	0	4	0
15	DF	(India) IND	Shubham Sarangi	7	0	3	0	4	0
22	DF	(India) IND	Hendry Antonay	0	0	0	0	0	0
27	DF	(India) IND	Sebastian Thangmuansang	1	0	0	0	1	0
30	DF	(India) IND	Denechandra Meitei	8	0	7	0	1	0
33	DF	(India) IND	Karan Amin	0	0	0	0	0	0
36	DF	(India) IND	Sahil Panwar	15	0	11	0	4	0
39	DF	(India) IND	Lalruatthara	2	0	1	0	1	0
55	DF	(India) IND	Deven Sawhney	0	0	0	0	0	0
6	MF	(Australia) AUS	Osama Malik	15	0	11	0	4	0
8	MF	(India) IND	Paul Ramfangzauva	5	0	2	0	3	0
10	MF	(India) IND	Raynier Fernandes	16	0	12	0	4	0
19	MF	(India) IND	Isak Vanlalruatfela	9	1	4	0	5	1
21	MF	(Spain) ESP	Saúl Crespo	14	3	9	0	5	3
24	MF	(India) IND	Thoiba Singh	17	1	12	0	5	1
48	MF	(India) IND	Isaac Vanmalsawma	15	2	12	1	3	1
7	FW	(Spain) ESP	Pedro Martín	17	4	12	3	5	1
9	FW	(Brazil) BRA	Diego Maurício	17	7	12	5	5	2
11	FW	(India) IND	Nanda Kumar	16	5	11	4	5	1
12	FW	(India) IND	Akshunna Tyagi	3	0	1	0	2	0
17	FW	(India) IND	Jerry Mawihmingthanga	17	6	12	3	5	3
23	FW	(India) IND	Michael Soosairaj	3	0	0	0	3	0
32	FW	(Spain) ESP	Víctor Rodríguez	8	0	8	0	0	0
37	FW	(India) IND	Rishabh Dobriyal	0	0	0	0	0	0
77	FW	(India) IND	CVL Remtluanga	0	0	0	0	0	0
