= 2021–22 Odisha FC season =

2021–22 season of Odisha FC

Odisha FC
2021–22 season
- President: Raj Athwal
- Manager: Kiko Ramírez
- Stadium: Tilak Maidan (Centralised Venue)
- Indian Super League: 7th
Home colours	Away colours	Third colours
- All statistics correct as of 13 September 2021.

The 2021–22 season was Odisha FC's third professional season in the Indian Super League since their establishment in 2019. The 2021–22 Indian Super League started from 19 November 2021.

== Overview ==
On 6 May, the club announced the appointment of David Villa as the head of Global Football Operations. The club also announced the appointment of former head coach Josep Gombau and Victor Onate as the members of Technical committee.

On 20 July, Odisha announced the appointment of Francisco "Kiko" Ramírez González as the head coach for 2021–22 Indian Super League along with the appointment of Assistant Coach and Head of Football Development, Joaquin "Kino" Garcia Sanchez.

On 1 September, the club entered into a 3-year international partnership deal with Premier League club Watford.

=== Training ===
Similar to the last season, the 2021–22 Indian Super League will also be hosted behind closed doors across three venues in Goa due to the COVID-19 pandemic in India. Odisha FC used the Our Lady of the Rosary Church Ground in Navelim, South Goa for their pre-season training. The team started their pre-season training by the end of first week of September 2021. Head coach Ramirez and his team arrived in Goa on 9 September for pre-season.

=== Transfers ===
On 22 April 2021, Odisha announced the contract extension of Jerry Mawihmingthanga till 2022. On 14 May, Odisha announced the signing of Sebastian Thangmuansang on a two-year contract from I-League side Gokulam Kerala FC. The club also announced the signing of Sahil Panwar on a two-year contract by paying an undisclosed transfer fee to Indian Super League side Hyderabad FC. On 8 June, the club announced the signing of defender Lalruatthara on a two-year deal.

On 7 July, Odisha announced the signing of Isaac Vanmalsawma on a two-year contract. On 12 July, the club announced that George D'Souza joined I-League 2nd Division club FC Bengaluru United on loan for the 2021–22 season.

On 23 July, Cole Alexander mutually terminated his contract with the club after agreeing to leave Odisha for South African Premier Division club, Kaizer Chiefs, at an undisclosed fee.

On 26 July, the club announced the signing of Spanish centre-back Víctor Mongil as its first foreign signing of the season. On 30 July, Odisha announced the signing of Spanish attacking-midfielder Javi Hernández.

On 5 August, the club announced the signing of Nikhil Raj on loan from Bangalore Super Division club Kickstart. On 11 August, Odisha announced the signing of Spanish centre-back Héctor Rodas. On 16 August, the club announced the signing of Spanish centre-forward and winger Aridai Cabrera. On 23 August, Odisha announced the signing of its AFC-quota player, midfielder Liridon Krasniqi, on loan from Johor Darul Ta'zim.

On 7 September, Odisha announced that 7 players from their youth setup were called up to the first team for trials at the pre-season training camp in Goa. On 9 September, Odisha announced the signing of Brazilian centre-forward Jonathas de Jesus from UAE Pro League-side Sharjah.

==== In ====
Date	Name	Moving from	Moving to	Ref.
14 May 2021	(India) Sahil Panwar	Hyderabad	Odisha	
5 July 2021	(India) Isaac Vanmalsawma	Jamshedpur	Odisha	
8 July 2021	(India) Lalruatthara	Kerala Blasters	Odisha	
14 July 2021	(India) Sebastian Thangmuansang	(India) Gokulam Kerala	Odisha	
26 July 2021	(Spain) Victor Mongil	(Georgia (country)) Dinamo Tbilisi	Odisha	
30 July 2021	(Spain) Javi Hernández	ATK Mohun Bagan	Odisha	
5 August 2021	(India) Nikhil Raj	(India) Kickstart	Odisha (loan)	
12 August 2021	(Spain) Héctor Rodas	(Spain) Cultural Leonesa	Odisha	
16 August 2021	(Spain) Aridai Cabrera	(Spain) Las Palmas	Odisha	
23 August 2021	(Malaysia) Liridon Krasniqi	(Malaysia) Johor Darul Ta'zim	Odisha (loan)	
9 September 2021	(Brazil) Jonathas de Jesus	(United Arab Emirates) Sharjah	Odisha	
30 December 2021	(India) Nikhil Prabhu	Hyderabad	Odisha (loan)	
25 January 2022	(India) Karan Amin	Jamshedpur	Odisha	
25 January 2022	(India) Antonio D'Silva	(India) Dempo	Odisha	
26 January 2022	(India) Redeem Tlang	Goa	Odisha (loan)	

==== Out ====
Date	Name	Moving from	Moving to	Ref.
5 March 2021	(England) Steven Taylor	Odisha	(New Zealand) Wellington Phoenix	
23 April 2021	(Brazil) Marcelinho	Odisha	(Brazil) EC Taubate	
12 July 2021	(India) George D'Souza	Odisha	(India) Bengaluru United (loan)	
13 July 2021	(Brazil) Diego Maurício	Odisha	(Qatar) Al-Shahania	
25 July 2021	(Senegal) Diawandou Diagne	Odisha	(Finland) Kotkan Työväen Palloilijat	
29 July 2021	(South Africa) Cole Alexander	Odisha	(South Africa) Kaizer Chiefs	
6 August 2021	(Australia) Jacob Tratt	Odisha	(Australia) Adelaide United	
9 August 2021	(Spain) Manuel Onwu	Odisha	(Spain) Badalona	
25 November 2021	(India) Samuel Lalmuanpuia	Odisha	(India) Aizawl	
2 January 2022	(India) Mohammad Sajid Dhot	Odisha	Chennaiyin	
5 January 2022	(India) Vinit Rai	Odisha	Mumbai City (loan)	
30 January 2022	(India) Ravi Kumar	Odisha	Mumbai City (loan)	

==== Out-on-Loan ====
Date	Name	Moving from	Moving to	Ref.
12 July 2021	(India) George D'Souza	Odisha	(India) Bengaluru United (loan)	
5 January 2022	(India) Vinit Rai	Odisha	Mumbai City (loan)	
30 January 2022	(India) Ravi Kumar	Odisha	Mumbai City (loan)	

==== Contract Extensions ====
Date	Player	Position	No	Contract Till	Ref.
22 April 2021	(India) Jerry Mawihmingthanga	RW	17	2022	

== Pre-season and friendlies ==
18 September 2021 Friendly	Salgaocar (India)	1–3	(India) Odisha	Navelim, Goa
		Report	Nandha; Daniel; Isak	Stadium: Our Lady of the Rosary Church Ground

22 September 2021 Friendly	Dempo (India)	1–0	(India) Odisha	Navelim, Goa
		Report		Stadium: Our Lady of the Rosary Church Ground

25 September 2021 Friendly	Churchill Brothers (India)	1–1	(India) Odisha	Navelim, Goa
		Report	Jerry	Stadium: Our Lady of the Rosary Church Ground

28 September 2021 Friendly	Goa II (India)	1–4	(India) Odisha	Navelim, Goa
		Report	Javi; Javi; Isaac; Isak	Stadium: Our Lady of the Rosary Church Ground

28 October 2021 Friendly	Chennaiyin (India)	1–2	(India) Odisha	Utorda, Goa
		Report	Javi; Víctor	Stadium: Sports Complex

1 November 2021 Friendly	Kerala Blasters (India)	2–1	(India) Odisha	Parra, Goa
			Javi	Stadium: Parra Ground

9 November 2021 Friendly	Mumbai City (India)	0–0	(India) Odisha	Nagoa, Goa
				Stadium: Nagoa Ground

16 November 2021 Friendly	Odisha (India)	2–1	(India) Hyderabad	Navelim, Goa
	Lalruatthara; Isak	Report		Stadium: Our Lady of the Rosary Church Ground

== Competitions ==
=== Overview ===
Competition	First match	Last match	Starting round	Record							
Competition	First match	Last match	Starting round	Pld	W	D	L	GF	GA	GD	Win %
2021–22 Indian Super League	24 November 2021	4 March 2022	Matchday 6	20	6	9	5	31	43	−12	30.00
Total				20	6	9	5	31	43	−12	30.00

Last updated: 4 March 2022.
Source: Competitions

=== Indian Super League ===
==== League table ====
Pos	Team	Pld	W	D	L	GF	GA	GD	Pts
5	Mumbai City	20	9	4	7	36	31	+5	31
6	Bengaluru	20	8	5	7	32	27	+5	29
7	Odisha	20	6	5	9	31	43	−12	23
8	Chennaiyin	20	5	5	10	17	35	−18	20
9	Goa	20	4	7	9	29	35	−6	19

Source: Indian Super League
Rules for classification: 1) points; 2) head-to-head points; 3) head-to-head goal difference; 4) head-to-head goals scored; 5) goal difference; 6) number of goals scored; 7) fair play ranking; 8) drawing of lots

==== Result summary ====
Overall								Home						Away					
Pld	W	D	L	GF	GA	GD	Pts	W	D	L	GF	GA	GD	W	D	L	GF	GA	GD
20	6	5	9	31	43	−12	23	4	3	3	20	20	0	2	2	6	11	23	−12

==== Matches ====
The league fixtures were announced on 13 September 2021.

24 November 2021 1	Odisha	3–1	Bengaluru	Vasco da Gama, Goa
19:30 IST (UTC+05:30)	Javi 3', 51'; Aridai 90+4'	Report	Costa 21'	Stadium: Tilak Maidan; Attendance: NA; Referee: R Venkatesh

30 November 2021 2	Odisha	6–4	East Bengal	Vasco da Gama, Goa
19:30 IST (UTC+05:30)	Hector 33', 40'; Javi 45'; Aridai 71', 90'; Isak Vanlalruatfela 82'	Report	Sidoel 13'; Haokip 80'; Chukwu 89', 90' (pen.)	Stadium: Tilak Maidan; Attendance: NA; Referee: Harish Kundu

5 December 2021 3	Kerala Blasters	2–1	Odisha	Vasco da Gama, Goa
19:30 IST (UTC+05:30)	Vázquez 62'; Prasanth 85'	Report	Raj 90+5'	Stadium: Tilak Maidan; Attendance: NA; Referee: R Venkatesh

10 December 2021 4	Odisha	1–0	NorthEast United	Vasco da Gama, Goa
19:30 IST (UTC+05:30)	Jonathas 81'	Report		Stadium: Tilak Maidan; Attendance: NA; Referee: Senthil Nathan S

14 December 2021 5	Odisha	0–4	Jamshedpur	Vasco da Gama, Goa
19:30 IST (UTC+05:30)		Report	Greg Stewart 4', 25', 35'; Peter Hartley 3'	Stadium: Tilak Maidan; Attendance: NA; Referee: Coimbatore Ramaswamy Srikrishna

18 December 2021 6	Chennaiyin	2–1	Odisha	Vasco da Gama, Goa
19:30 IST (UTC+05:30)	Narayan Das (yellow card) 10'; Germanpreet Singh 23' (yellow card) 45'; Ariel Borysiuk (yellow card) 49'; Mirlan Murzaev 63'	Report	Isaac Vanmalsawma (yellow card) 29'; Thoiba Singh (yellow card) 53'; Sebastian Thangmuansang (yellow card) 75'; Javi Hernández (yellow card) 86' (goal) 90'	Stadium: Tilak Maidan; Attendance: NA; Referee: Pratik Mondal

24 December 2021 7	Odisha	1–1	Goa	Vasco da Gama, Goa
19:30 IST (UTC+05:30)	Jonathas 53'	Report	Ivan Gonzalez 42'	Stadium: Tilak Maidan; Attendance: NA; Referee: Coimbatore Ramaswamy Srikrishna

28 November 2021 8	Hyderabad	6–1	Odisha	Bambolim, Goa
19:30 IST (UTC+05:30)	Sailung 8' (o.g.); Ogbeche 39', 60' (yellow card) 44'; García 54'; Siverio 72'; Victor 86' (pen.)	Report	Rodas (yellow card) 8'; Juanan 16' (o.g.); Krasniqi (yellow card) 54'	Stadium: GMC Athletic Stadium; Attendance: NA; Referee: Ashwin

3 January 2022 9	Odisha	4–2	Mumbai City	Vasco da Gama, Goa
19:30 IST (UTC+05:30)	Jerry Mawihmingthanga 70', 77'; Aridai 4'; Jonathas 89'	Report	Ahmed Jahouh 11'; Igor Angulo 38'	Stadium: Tilak Maidan; Attendance: NA; Referee: R Venkatesh

~~5 January 2022~~; 23 January 2022 10	ATK Mohun Bagan	0–0	Odisha	Fatorda, Goa
21:30 IST	Tangri (yellow card) 64'; Bose (yellow card) 79'	Report	T Singh (yellow card) 31'; Hernández (yellow card) 54'	Stadium: Fatorda Stadium; Attendance: NA; Referee: Harish Kundu
Note: The match was postponed due to a player testing COVID-19 positive on the matchday.

== Personnel ==
=== Current technical staff ===
Position	Name
Head coach	(Spain) Kiko Ramírez
Assistant Coach	(Spain) Kino Sanchez
Assistant Coach	(India) Anshul Katiyar
Goalkeeping Coach	(Argentina) Manu Patricio
Strength & Conditioning Coach	(Spain) José Mascarós Balaguer
Team Doctor & Head of Medical Services	(India) Dr. Praveen Choudhary
Team Physiotherapists	(India) Dr. Firoz Shaikh
Team Physiotherapists	(India) Dr. Naved Hameed
Team Masseur	(India) Bybu Ponnarassery Ravunny Thrissur

=== Football Sport Management ===
Position	Name
Head of Football Operations	(India) Abhik Chatterjee
Head of Global Football Operations	(Spain) David Villa
Technical Committee	(Spain) David Villa (Spain) Josep Gombau (Spain) Victor Oñate
Head of Football Development	(Spain) Kino Sanchez
Head of Football Development	(India) Aakash Narula
Odisha Reserves (U18) Coach	(India) Sandeep Alhan
Odisha U15 Coach	(India) Amit Rana
Odisha U13 Coach	(India) Kirti Kashyap
Youth Teams Manager	(India) Sayantan Ganguly
Grassroots Manager	(India) Suvam Das
Commercial Manager	(India) Yash Chugh
Media Manager	(India) Chiranjibi Pati

== Management ==
=== Board of directors ===
Position	Name
President	(England) Raj Athwal
Club Director	(India) Ashok Bajaj
Club Advisor	(United States) Rohan Sharma
Head of Sales & Marketing	(India) Mayank Sharma
Head of Finance	(India) Ajit Panda

== Statistics ==
As of 10 December 2021

=== Appearances and goals ===
No.	Pos	Nat	Player	Total		ISL	
No.	Pos	Nat	Player	Apps	Goals	Apps	Goals
Goalkeepers
1	GK	(India) IND	Arshdeep Singh	0	0	0+0	0
23	GK	(India) IND	Ravi Kumar	0	0	0+0	0
30	GK	(India) IND	Kamaljit Singh	4	0	4+0	0
Defenders
2	DF	(India) IND	Lalhrezuala Sailung	1	0	0+1	0
3	DF	(Spain) ESP	Víctor Mongil	4	0	4+0	0
4	DF	(Spain) ESP	Héctor Rodas	3	2	3+0	2
13	DF	(India) IND	Gaurav Bora	3	0	1+2	0
22	DF	(India) IND	Hendry Antonay	4	0	4+0	0
27	DF	(India) IND	Sebastian Thangmuansang	0	0	0+0	0
36	DF	(India) IND	Sahil Panwar	0	0	0+0	0
39	DF	(India) IND	Lalruatthara	4	0	4+0	0
55	DF	(India) IND	Deven Sawhney	0	0	0+0	0
Midfielders
8	MF	(India) IND	Paul Ramfangzauva	1	0	0+1	0
10	MF	(Spain) ESP	Javi Hernández	4	3	4+0	3
16	MF	(India) IND	Vinit Rai	4	0	4+0	0
19	MF	(India) IND	Isak Vanlalruatfela	3	1	1+2	1
24	MF	(India) IND	Thoiba Singh Moirangthem	4	0	3+1	0
48	MF	(India) IND	Issac Vanmalsawma	4	0	1+3	0
92	MF	(Malaysia) MAS	Liridon Krasniqi	4	0	2+2	0
Forwards
7	FW	(Spain) ESP	Aridai Cabrera	4	3	2+2	3
9	FW	(Brazil) BRA	Jonathas	3	1	1+2	1
11	FW	(India) IND	Nanda Kumar	2	0	2+0	0
12	FW	(India) IND	Akshunna Tyagi	0	0	0+0	0
14	FW	(India) IND	Daniel Lalhlimpuia	2	0	1+1	0
17	FW	(India) IND	Jerry Mawihmingthanga	4	0	3+1	0
21	FW	(India) IND	Nikhil Raj	2	1	0+2	1
77	FW	(India) IND	CVL Remtluanga	0	0	0+0	0

- Source: Indian Super League

=== Goal scorers ===
Rank	No.	Pos	Nat	Player	ISL	Total
1	9	FW	(Brazil)	Jonathas de Jesus	8	8
2	10	FW	(Spain)	Javi Hernández	6	6
3	7	FW	(Spain)	Aridai Cabrera	5	5
4	17	FW	(India)	Jerry Mawihmingthanga	3	3
5	4	DF	(Spain)	Héctor Rodas	2	2
6	19	MF	(India)	Isak Vanlalruatfela	1	1
6	21	FW	(India)	Nikhil Raj	1	1
6	14	FW	(India)	Daniel Lalhlimpuia	1	1
6	18	FW	(India)	Redeem Tlang	1	1
6	11	MF	(India)	Nandhakumar Sekar	1	1
6	8	MF	(India)	Paul Ramfangzauva	1	1
Total					30	30

Source: Indian Super League

=== Clean sheets ===
Rank	No.	Pos	Nat	Player	ISL	Total
1	1	GK	(India)	Arshdeep Singh	2	2
2	30	GK	(India)	Kamaljit Singh	1	1
Total					3	3

Source: Indian Super League

=== Disciplinary record ===
Rank	No.	Pos	Nat	Player	ISL		Total	
Rank	No.	Pos	Nat	Player	Booked	Sent off (straight red)	Booked	Sent off (straight red)
1	24	MF	(India)	Thoiba Singh Moirangthem	7	0	7	0
2	39	DF	(India)	Lalruatthara	5	0	5	0
3	22	DF	(India)	Hendry Antonay	4	0	4	0
4	10	MF	(Spain)	Javi Hernández	3	0	3	0
5	9	FW	(Brazil)	Jonathas de Jesus	1	1	1	1
5	27	DF	(India)	Sebastian Thangmuansang	2	0	2	0
5	4	DF	(Spain)	Héctor Rodas	2	0	2	0
5	92	MF	(Spain)	Liridon Krasniqi	2	0	2	0
5	7	FW	(Spain)	Aridai Cabrera	2	0	2	0
5	3	DF	(Spain)	Víctor Mongil	2	0	2	0
5	48	MF	(India)	Isaac Vanmalsawma	2	0	2	0
6	11	MF	(India)	Nandhakumar Sekar	1	0	1	0
6	13	DF	(India)	Gaurav Bora	1	0	1	0
6	36	DF	(India)	Sahil Panwar	1	0	1	0
6	17	FW	(India)	Jerry Mawihmingthanga	1	0	1	0

Source: Indian Super League
