= Jerry Mawihmingthanga =

Indian footballer (born 1997)

- Jerry Mawihmingthanga with Odisha FC (2025)

Personal information
- Full name: Jerry Mawihmingthanga
- Date of birth: 9 March 1997 (age 29)
- Place of birth: Mizoram, India
- Height: 1.68 m (5 ft 6 in)
- Position: Winger

Team information
- Current team: Sreenidi Decan

Youth career
- 2014–2016: DSK Shivajians

Senior career*
Years	Team	Apps	(Gls)
2016–2017	DSK Shivajians	15	(2)
2016	→ NorthEast United (loan)	1	(0)
2017–2019	Jamshedpur	28	(1)
2019–2025	Odisha	112	(17)
2025–2026	East Bengal	0	(0)
2026–	Sreenidi Decan	0	(0)

International career^{‡}
2015	India U19	3	(0)
2016–2017	India U23	4	(1)
- * Club domestic league appearances and goals as of 16:30, 5 March 2025 (UTC) ‡ National team caps and goals as of 16 June 2017

Jerry Mawihmingthanga (born 9 March 1997) is an Indian professional footballer who plays as a winger for Indian Football League club Sreenidi Decan.

== Club career ==
=== DSK Shivajians ===
Born in Mizoram, Mawihmingthana started his career with the DSK Shivajians Academy. In March 2016, Mawihmingthana, along with teammate Lallianzuala Chhangte, went to train with Liverpool Reserves in England.

==== Loan to NorthEast United ====
On 16 May 2016, it was announced that Mawihmingthana, along with Chhangte, would sign on loan for NorthEast United of the Indian Super League from DSK Shivajians. He made his debut for the team on 7 October 2016 against Mumbai City. He came on in the 72nd minute for Rowllin Borges.

==== Return to DSK Shivajians ====
After NorthEast United failed to qualify for the playoffs, Mawihmingthana returned to DSK Shivajians, only playing one match for NorthEast United. He made his senior debut for the club in their first match of the season against Mumbai. He started and played the whole match as DSK Shivajians lost 1–0.

On 11 March 2017, Mawihmingthanga scored his first professional goal against Mumbai. He found the net in the 83rd minute as DSK Shivajians went on to win 5–0. He then scored his second goal of his career a month later against East Bengal on 17 April 2017. His 29th-minute strike was the only goal in a 1–0 victory for DSK Shivajians.

=== Jamshedpur ===
On 23 July 2017, after completing his season with DSK Shivajians, Mawihmingthanga was selected in the seventh round of the 2017–18 ISL Players Draft by Jamshedpur for the 2017–18 Indian Super League. He made his debut for Jamshedpur in their first ever match on 18 November 2017 against his former club NorthEast United. He started and played the whole match as Jamshedpur drew 0–0.

On 17 January 2018, Mawihmingthanga scored his first competitive goal in the Indian Super League in a 2–1 victory against the Kerala Blasters. He opened the scoring just 22 seconds into the match, the fastest goal in Indian Super League history. Over the course of the two seasons he spend at Jamshedpur, he would end up scoring once and assisting 4 times.

=== Odisha ===
Jerry signed for newly re-branded Odisha for the 2019–20 Indian Super League, where he would play 17 times, scoring twice and assisting 5 times. The 2020–21 season would be a disappointing one for his team finishing bottom of the table despite Jerry scoring twice and assisting 5 times during the season to match his numbers from his first season.

On 22 April 2021, Odisha announced contract extension with Jerry. He had a good 2021–22 season with 3 assists and 2 goals, but Odisha failed to qualify for the 2021–22 ISL playoffs. On 17 August 2022, he scored a brace in the 2022 Durand Cup season opener against NorthEast United, which ended in a thumping 6–0 win for Odisha.

== International career ==
Mawihmingthana has represented India at the under-19 level. In July 2017, after his season with DSK Shivajians, Mawihmingthanga was selected to be part of the India U23 side.

== Career statistics ==
=== Club ===
As of 4 March 2023

Appearances and goals by club, season and competition
Club	Season	League			Cup		AFC		Total	
Club	Season	Division	Apps	Goals	Apps	Goals	Apps	Goals	Apps	Goals
DSK Shivajians	2016–17	I-League	15	2	3 (Note: Appearances in Federation Cup)	0	—		18	2
NorthEast United (loan)	2016	Indian Super League	1	0	0	0	—		1	0
Jamshedpur	2017–18	Indian Super League	16	1	1 (Note: Appearances in Super Cup)	0	—		17	1
Jamshedpur	2018–19	Indian Super League	12	0	1	0	—		13	0
Jamshedpur	Total		28	1	2	0	0	0	30	1
Odisha	2019–20	Indian Super League	17	2	0	0	—		17	2
Odisha	2020–21	Indian Super League	17	2	0	0	—		17	2
Odisha	2021–22	Indian Super League	19	3	0	0	—		19	3
Odisha	2022–23	Indian Super League	20	3	5 (Note: Appearances in Durand Cup)	3	1 (Note: Appearance in playoff for AFC Cup)	0	25	6
Odisha	Total		73	10	5	3	0	0	78	13
Career total			117	13	10	3	0	0	127	16

== Honours ==
India U23

- South Asian Games Silver medal: 2016

Odisha

- Super Cup: 2023

East Bengal FC

- Indian Super League: 2025-26

Individual

- FPAI Young Player of the Year: 2019–20
