= Ivan Veras =

Belarusian professional footballer

Personal information
- Full name: Ivan Sergeyevich Veras
- Date of birth: 22 April 1997 (age 29)
- Place of birth: Minsk, Belarus
- Height: 1.78 m (5 ft 10 in)
- Position: Forward

Team information
- Current team: Persiku Kudus
- Number: 9

Youth career
- –2015: Minsk

Senior career*
Years	Team	Apps	(Gls)
2016–2018	Belshina Bobruisk	29	(9)
2018	Chist	13	(3)
2019	Granit Mikashevichi	27	(15)
2020	Smolevichi	12	(0)
2020–2021	Krumkachy Minsk	40	(5)
2022	United Victory		
2023	Aizawl	8	(2)
2024	Orsha	10	(1)
2025	RANS Nusantara	9	(3)
2025	Orsha	18	(2)
2026	Belshina Bobruisk	7	(0)
2026–	Persiku Kudus	1	(0)
- * Club domestic league appearances and goals as of 20 September 2026

Ivan Sergeyevich Veras (Belarusian: Іван Верас; Russian: Иван Верас; born 22 April 1997) is a Belarusian professional footballer who plays as a forward for Championship club Persiku Kudus.

== Club career ==
In 2023, Veras joined Indian I-League club Aizawl. He helped the team qualifying 2023 Indian Super Cup in April, scoring the lone goal in their 1–0 win against TRAU in playoff. In the Group B opener on 9 April, he maintained his goalscoring form, as Aizawl lost narrowly to Hyderabad by 2–1.
