= 2022–23 Indian Super League =

Indian Super League
- ISL poster welcoming fans back after COVID-19
- Season: 2022–23
- Dates: League: 7 October 2022 – 26 February 2023; Playoffs: 3 March 2023 – 18 March 2023
- Champions: Mumbai City; 2nd ISL Shield title 2nd Indian title
- ISL Cup Winners: ATK Mohun Bagan; 1st ISL Cup title
- AFC Champions League: Mumbai City
- AFC Cup: Odisha; ATK Mohun Bagan
- Matches: 117
- Goals: 345 (2.95 per match)
- Top goalscorer: Diego Mauricio; Cleiton Silva; Dimitri Petratos (12 goals each)
- Best goalkeeper: Vishal Kaith (12 clean sheets)
- Biggest home win: Hyderabad 6–1 NorthEast United (29 December 2022)
- Biggest away win: Chennaiyin 2–6 Mumbai City (12 November 2022); NorthEast United 3–7 Chennaiyin (10 December 2022)
- Highest scoring: NorthEast United 3–7 Chennaiyin (10 December 2022)
- Longest winning run: 11 matches Mumbai City
- Longest unbeaten run: 18 matches Mumbai City
- Longest winless run: 10 matches NorthEast United; Jamshedpur
- Longest losing run: 10 matches NorthEast United
- Highest attendance: 62,542; Mohun Bagan 2–0 East Bengal (29 October 2022)
- Lowest attendance: 361; NorthEast United 2–2 Goa (15 January 2023)
- Total attendance: 1,491,798
- Average attendance: 12,750

The 2022–23 Indian Super League was the ninth season of the Indian Super League, the first season as the only top division, and the 27th season of top-tier Indian football. It commenced on 7 October 2022 and concluded with the final on 18 March 2023.

Jamshedpur were the defending premiers and Hyderabad were the defending champions.

Mumbai City became champions by winning their second League Winners' Shield, and ATK Mohun Bagan won their first ISL cup title, defeating Bengaluru in the final.

== Changes from last season ==
- Six instead of four clubs will compete for the playoffs. The top two clubs qualify directly for the playoffs, while the next four sides will play a single-legged match to decide the remaining two teams for the semifinals. The third-ranked team will play against the sixth-ranked team. Similarly, the fourth-ranked team will play against the fifth-ranked team, with the higher-ranked side hosting the match.
- The traditional home and away format has returned.
- The league will be played over five months for the first time. However, there was no break during the 2022 FIFA World Cup.

== Teams ==
Eleven teams played in the 2022–23 season.

Locations of the Indian Super League teams

=== Stadiums and locations ===
Club	State/Region	City	Stadium	Capacity
ATK Mohun Bagan	West Bengal	Kolkata	Vivekananda Yuba Bharati Krirangan	85,000
Bengaluru	Karnataka	Bengaluru	Sree Kanteerava Stadium	25,810
Chennaiyin	Tamil Nadu	Chennai	Jawaharlal Nehru Stadium	40,000
East Bengal	West Bengal	Kolkata	Vivekananda Yuba Bharati Krirangan	85,000
Goa	Goa	Margao	Pandit Jawaharlal Nehru Stadium	19,000
Hyderabad	Telangana	Hyderabad	G.M.C. Balayogi Athletic Stadium	30,000
Jamshepur	Jharkhand	Jamshedpur	JRD Tata Sports Complex	24,424
Kerala Blasters	Kerala	Kochi	Jawaharlal Nehru International Stadium	39,000
Mumbai City	Maharashtra	Mumbai	Mumbai Football Arena	6,600
NorthEast United	Assam	Guwahati	Indira Gandhi Athletic Stadium	24,627
Odisha	Odisha	Bhubaneswar	Kalinga Stadium	15,000

=== Personnel and kits ===
Team	Head coach	Captain (s)	Kit manufacturer	Shirt main sponsor
ATK Mohun Bagan	(Spain) Juan Ferrando	(India) Pritam Kotal	Nivia	Parimatch News
Bengaluru	(England) Simon Grayson	(India) Gurpreet Singh Sandhu	Puma	JSW
Chennaiyin	(Germany) Thomas Brdarić	(India) Anirudh Thapa	Nivia	Apollo Tyres
East Bengal	(England) Stephen Constantine	(Spain) Iván González; (Brazil) Cleiton Silva; (India) Souvik Chakrabarti; (India) Sumit Passi; (India) Kamaljit Singh	Trak-Only	1xBat
Goa	(Spain) Carlos Peña	(India) Brandon Fernandes	T10 Sports	Parimatch News
Hyderabad	(Spain) Manolo Márquez	(Brazil) João Victor	Hummel	Stake News
Jamshedpur	(England) Aidy Boothroyd	(Brazil) Eli Sabiá	Nivia	Tata Steel
Kerala Blasters	(Serbia) Ivan Vukomanović	(India) Jessel Carneiro	SIX5SIX	BYJU'S
Mumbai City	(England) Des Buckingham	(Senegal) Mourtada Fall	Puma	Stake News
NorthEast United	(Italy) Vincenzo Alberto Annese	(Denmark) Michael Jakobsen; (India) Arindam Bhattacharya; (India) Gurjinder Kumar; (India) Gaurav Bora	SIX5SIX	Meghalaya Tourism
Odisha	(Spain) Josep Gombau	(Spain) Carlos Delgado	Trak-Only	Odisha Tourism

=== Managerial changes ===
Team	Outgoing manager	Manner of departure	Date of vacancy	Position in the table	Incoming manager	Date of appointment
Chennaiyin	(India) Syed Sabir Pasha	End of interim period	20 March 2022	Pre-season	(Germany) Thomas Brdarić	14 June 2022
Goa	(India) Derrick Pereira	End of interim period	20 March 2022	Pre-season	(Spain) Carlos Peña	16 April 2022
East Bengal	(Spain) Mario Rivera	Contract expired	20 March 2022	Pre-season	(England) Stephen Constantine	23 July 2022
Jamshedpur	(Scotland) Owen Coyle	Mutual consent	22 March 2022	Pre-season	(England) Aidy Boothroyd	10 July 2022
NorthEast United	(India) Khalid Jamil	Contract expired	28 May 2022	Pre-season	(Israel) Marco Balbul	11 August 2022
Bengaluru	(Germany) Marco Pezzaiuoli	Contract expired	8 June 2022	Pre-season	(England) Simon Grayson	8 June 2022
Odisha	(Spain) Kino García	End of interim period	8 June 2022	Pre-season	(Spain) Josep Gombau	8 June 2022
NorthEast United	(Israel) Marco Balbul	Sacked	8 December 2022	11th	(Italy) Vincenzo Alberto Annese	8 December 2022
NorthEast United	(Italy) Vincenzo Alberto Annese	Joined Nepal	28 February 2023	Post-season	(India) Floyd Pinto	1 March 2023
Odisha	(Spain) Josep Gombau	Mutual consent	18 March 2023	Post-season	(India) Clifford Miranda	18 March 2023

== Foreign players ==
The AIFF allows clubs to register a maximum of six foreign players, including one AFC quota player while four can be fielded in a match at a time.

Bold denotes that the player was either signed mid-season or during the winter transfer window.

Italics denotes that the player was injured but still part of the team.

Club	Player 1	Player 2	Player 3	Player 4	Player 5	AFC player	Former player(s)
ATK Mohun Bagan	(Australia) Dimitri Petratos	(France) Hugo Boumous	(Republic of Ireland) Carl McHugh	(Montenegro) **Slavko Damjanović**	(Uruguay) **Federico Gallego**	(Australia) Brendan Hamill	(Guinea) Florentin Pogba (Finland) Joni Kauko
Bengaluru	(Brazil) Alan Costa	(Brazil) Bruno Ramires	(Fiji) Roy Krishna	(Spain) Javi Hernández	(Spain) **Pablo Pérez**	(Australia) Aleksandar Jovanovic	(Republic of the Congo) Prince Ibara
Chennaiyin	(Croatia) Petar Slišković	(Germany) Julius Düker	(Ghana) Kwame Karikari	(Netherlands) Abdenasser El Khayati	(Senegal) Fallou Diagne	(Iran) Vafa Hakhamaneshi	
East Bengal	(Brazil) Alex Lima	(Brazil) Cleiton Silva	(Cyprus) Charalambos Kyriakou	(England) **Jake Jervis**	(Spain) Iván González	(Australia) Jordan O'Doherty	(Brazil) Eliandro
Goa	(Morocco) Noah Sadaoui	(Spain) Álvaro Vázquez	(Spain) Edu Bedia	(Spain) **Hernán Santana**	(Spain) Iker Guarrotxena	(Syria) Fares Arnaout	(Spain) Marc Valiente
Hyderabad	(Brazil) João Victor	(Nigeria) Bartholomew Ogbeche	(Spain) Borja Herrera	(Spain) Javier Siverio	(Spain) Odei Onaindia	(Australia) Joel Chianese	
Jamshedpur	(Australia) **Dylan Fox**	(Brazil) Eli Sabiá	(Brazil) **Rafael Crivellaro**	(England) Jay Emmanuel-Thomas	(Nigeria) Daniel Chima	(Australia) Harry Sawyer	(Brazil) Wellington Priori (England) Peter Hartley
Kerala Blasters	(Croatia) Marko Lešković	(Greece) Dimitrios Diamantakos	(Spain) Víctor Mongil	(Ukraine) Ivan Kalyuzhnyi	(Uruguay) Adrián Luna	(Australia) Apostolos Giannou	
Mumbai City	(Argentina) Jorge Pereyra Díaz	(Morocco) Ahmed Jahouh	(Senegal) Mourtada Fall	(Scotland) Greg Stewart	(Spain) Alberto Noguera	(Australia) Rostyn Griffiths	
NorthEast United	(Colombia) **Wilmar Jordán**	(Democratic Republic of the Congo) **Kule Mbombo**	(France) Romain Philippoteaux	(Spain) **Joseba Beitia**		(Australia) Aaron Evans	(Nigeria) Sylvester Igboun (England) Matt Derbyshire (Spain) Jon Gaztañaga (Denmark) Michael Jakobsen
Odisha	(Brazil) Diego Maurício	(Spain) Carlos Delgado	(Spain) Pedro Martín	(Spain) Saúl Crespo	(Spain) Víctor Rodríguez	(Australia) Osama Malik	

== League table ==
Pos	Team	Pld	W	D	L	GF	GA	GD	Pts	Qualification
1	Mumbai City (C)	20	14	4	2	54	21	+33	46	ISL Cup Semi-finals, Playoffs for 2023–24 ACL group stage and 2023–24 ACL group stage (Note: Qualified via winning the Indian club qualifiers for 2023–24 AFC competitions) (Note: It was announced by AIFF that 2022-23 will be the last season in which the defending Cup Winners will wear the Champions badge. Starting from 2023-24 season it will be the defending League Shield Winners that will wear the Champions badge hereafter.)
2	Hyderabad	20	13	3	4	36	16	+20	42	ISL Cup Semi-finals
3	ATK Mohun Bagan (W)	20	10	4	6	24	17	+7	34 (Note: Head-to-head points: ATK Mohun Bagan 3, Bengaluru 3. Head-to-head goal difference: ATK Mohun Bagan 0, Bengaluru 0. Head-to-head goal scored: ATK Mohun Bagan 4, Bengaluru 4. Goal difference: ATK Mohun Bagan +7, Bengaluru +4.)	ISL Cup Knockouts, Playoffs for 2023–24 AFC Cup qualifiers (Note: Qualified via winning the 2023 Indian Super League playoffs) and 2023–24 AFC Cup qualifiers (Note: Qualified via winning the Indian club qualifiers for 2023–24 AFC competitions) (Note: It was announced by AIFF that 2022-23 will be the last season in which the reigning Cup Winners will wear the Champions badge. Starting from 2023-24 season it will be the reigning League Shield Winners that will wear the Champions badge thereafter.)
4	Bengaluru	20	11	1	8	27	23	+4	34	ISL Cup Knockouts
5	Kerala Blasters	20	10	1	9	28	28	0	31	ISL Cup Knockouts
6	Odisha	20	9	3	8	30	32	−2	30	ISL Cup Knockouts, Playoffs for 2023–24 AFC Cup group stage (Note: Qualified via winning the 2023 Super Cup) and 2023–24 AFC Cup group stage (Note: Qualified via winning the Indian club qualifiers for 2023–24 AFC competitions)
7	Goa	20	8	3	9	36	35	+1	27 (Note: Head-to-head points: Goa 3, Chennaiyin 3. Head-to-head goal difference: Goa +1, Chennaiyin -1.)	
8	Chennaiyin	20	7	6	7	36	37	−1	27	
9	East Bengal	20	6	1	13	22	38	−16	19 (Note: Head-to-head points: East Bengal 3, Jamshedpur 3. Head-to-head goal difference: East Bengal +1, Jamshedpur -1.)	
10	Jamshedpur	20	5	4	11	21	32	−11	19	
11	NorthEast United	20	1	2	17	20	55	−35	5	

Source: Indian Super League
Rules for classification: 1) points; 2) head-to-head points; 3) head-to-head goal difference; 4) head-to-head goals scored; 5) goal difference; 6) number of goals scored; 7) fair play ranking; 8) drawing of lots
(C) Champions; (W) ISL Cup winners

== Results ==
Home \ Away	MB	BEN	CHE	EAB	GOA	HYD	JAM	KER	MCI	NEU	OFC
ATK Mohun Bagan	—	1–2	1–2	2–0	2–1	1–0	1–0	2–1	0–1	2–1	2–0
Bengaluru	0–1	—	3–1	0–1	3–1	0–3	1–0	1–0	2–1	1–0	3–1
Chennaiyin	0–0	1–1	—	2–0	0–2	1–3	3–1	1–1	2–6	4–3	2–2
East Bengal	0–2	2–1	0–1	—	1–2	0–2	1–2	1–0	0–3	3–3	2–4
Goa	3–0	0–2	1–2	4–2	—	1–3	3–0	3–1	3–5	2–1	3–0
Hyderabad	1–0	1–0	1–1	2–0	1–0	—	2–3	0–1	3–3	6–1	1–0
Jamshedpur	0–0	0–3	2–2	1–3	2–2	0–1	—	0–1	1–2	1–0	2–3
Kerala Blasters	2–5	3–2	2–1	3–1	3–1	0–1	3–1	—	0–2	2–0	1–0
Mumbai City	2–2	4–0	2–1	0–1	4–1	1–1	1–1	4–0	—	4–0	2–0
NorthEast United	1–0	1–2	3–7	1–3	2–2	0–3	0–2	0–3	1–3	—	1–3
Odisha	0–0	1–0	3–2	3–1	1–1	3–1	0–2	2–1	2–4	2–1	—

Updated to match(es) played on 26 February 2023. Source: Indian Super League
Legend: Blue = home team win; Yellow = draw; Red = away team win.

=== Form ===
Team ╲ Round	1	2	3	4	5	6	7	8	9	10	11	12	13	14	15	16	17	18	19	20
ATK Mohun Bagan	L	W	W	D	W	L	W	W	W	D	L	W	L	D	W	L	D	L	W	W
Bengaluru	W	D	L	L	L	L	W	L	L	W	L	L	W	W	W	W	W	W	W	W
Chennaiyin	W	D	L	W	L	W	L	L	W	D	L	D	D	D	L	D	L	W	W	W
East Bengal	L	L	W	L	L	W	L	W	L	L	W	L	L	L	L	W	D	L	W	L
Goa	W	W	L	W	L	W	L	L	W	W	D	L	L	D	W	W	D	L	L	L
Hyderabad	D	W	W	W	W	W	L	L	W	W	W	W	W	D	W	D	L	W	L	W
Jamshedpur	L	D	W	L	L	L	L	L	L	L	D	L	D	W	L	L	W	D	W	W
Kerala Blasters	W	L	L	L	W	W	W	W	W	D	W	W	L	L	W	L	W	L	L	L
Mumbai City	D	W	D	W	D	W	W	W	W	W	W	W	W	W	W	W	D	W	L	L
NorthEast United	L	L	L	L	L	L	L	L	L	L	W	L	L	D	L	L	L	D	L	L
Odisha	W	L	W	W	L	W	W	W	L	D	L	L	W	L	L	D	D	W	W	L

Updated to match(es) played on 26 February 2023. Source: Indian Super League
W = Win; D = Draw; L = Lose

== Season statistics ==
=== Top scorers ===
Rank	Player	Club	Goals
1	(Brazil) Diego Maurício	Odisha	12
1	(Brazil) Cleiton Silva	East Bengal	12
1	(Australia) Dimitri Petratos	ATK Mohun Bagan	12
4	(Argentina) Jorge Pereyra Díaz	Mumbai City	11
4	(Spain) Iker Guarrotxena	Goa	11
6	(Nigeria) Bartholomew Ogbeche	Hyderabad	10
6	(Greece) Dimitrios Diamantakos	Kerala Blasters	10
6	(India) Lallianzuala Chhangte	Mumbai City	10
9	(Netherlands) Abdenasser El Khayati	Chennaiyin	9
9	(Morocco) Noah Sadaoui	Goa	9

==== Hat-tricks ====
Player	For	Against	Result	Date	Ref
(Australia) Dimitri Petratos	ATK Mohun Bagan	Kerala Blasters	5–2 (A)	16 October 2022	
(Netherlands) Abdenasser El Khayati	Chennaiyin	NorthEast United	7–3 (A)	10 December 2022	
(Nigeria) Bartholomew Ogbeche	Hyderabad	Goa	3–1 (A)	5 January 2023	
(Spain) Iker Guarrotxena	Goa	East Bengal	4–2 (H)	26 January 2023	

=== Top assists ===
Rank	Player	Club	Assists
1	(Morocco) Noah Sadaoui	Goa	9
2	(Scotland) Greg Stewart	Mumbai City	8
3	(India) Naorem Mahesh Singh	East Bengal	7
3	(Australia) Dimitri Petratos	ATK Mohun Bagan	7
5	(India) Halicharan Narzary	Hyderabad	6
5	(Argentina) Jorge Pereyra Díaz	Mumbai City	6
5	(Uruguay) Adrián Luna	Kerala Blasters	6
5	(India) Lallianzuala Chhangte	Mumbai City	6
9	(Netherlands) Abdenasser El Khayati	Chennaiyin	5
9	(Australia) Harry Sawyer	Jamshedpur	5
9	(India) Aakash Sangwan	Chennaiyin	5
9	(Spain) Javi Hernández	Bengaluru	5
9	(Spain) Borja Herrera	Hyderabad	5
9	(Fiji) Roy Krishna	Bengaluru	5

=== Clean sheets ===
Rank	Player	Club	Clean sheets
1	(India) Vishal Kaith	ATK Mohun Bagan	12
2	(India) Gurmeet Singh	Hyderabad	7
2	(India) Phurba Lachenpa	Mumbai City	7
2	(India) Gurpreet Singh Sandhu	Bengaluru	7
5	(India) Laxmikant Kattimani	Hyderabad	4
5	(India) Prabhsukhan Singh Gill	Kerala Blasters	4
5	(India) Dheeraj Singh	Goa	4
8	(India) Rehenesh TP	Jamshedpur	3
8	(India) Kamaljit Singh	East Bengal	3
10	(India) Samik Mitra	Chennaiyin	2
10	(India) Amrinder Singh	Odisha	2

=== Discipline ===
==== Player ====
- Most yellow cards: 8
  - (India) Suhair Vadakkepeedika
- Most red cards: 1
  - 14 players

==== Club ====
- Most yellow cards: 49
  - ATK Mohun Bagan
- Most red cards: 3
  - Chennaiyin

== Attendances ==
=== Regular season ===
Pos	Team	Total	High	Low	Average	Change
1	Kerala Blasters	278,253	34,984	18,018	27,825	+58.9%
2	ATK Mohun Bagan	250,720	62,542	14,533	25,072	n/a^{‡}
3	Jamshedpur	146,523	22,389	7,430	14,652	−10.8%
4	East Bengal	144,326	60,102	1,982	14,433	+69.9%^{††}
5	Bengaluru	113,712	28,001	5,901	11,371	−22.2%
6	Goa	102,200	13,123	7,949	10,220	−21.4%
7	Chennaiyin	87,012	12,719	5,248	8,701	−3.1%
8	Hyderabad	71,947	11,834	2,127	7,195	−1.4%^{§}
9	Odisha	61,975	7,716	4,417	6,198	−0.5%
10	Mumbai City	49,663	6,407	3,187	4,966	−5.2%
11	NorthEast United	24,573	8,627	361	2,457	−70.2%
	League total	1,330,904	62,542	361	12,099	−2.1%

Updated to games played on 26 February 2023
Source: worldfootball.net
Notes:
^{†}Previous season average attendances are from the 2019–20 season, with spectators allowed prior to the COVID-19 pandemic restrictions.
^{††} East Bengal played in the I-League in the 2019–20 season.
^{‡} Attendance count for ATK Mohun Bagan starts from this season.
^{§} Hyderabad played their first home match at the Shree Shiv Chhatrapati Sports Complex, Pune.

=== Attendances by match ===
==== Regular season ====
Team \ Home Game	1	2	3	4	5	6	7	8	9	10	Total
Kerala Blasters	34,978	34,984	33,121	29,347	25,184	31,712	24,117	18,018	21,049	25,743	278,253
ATK Mohun Bagan	22,236	62,542	26,425	26,493	15,217	19,873	29,857	14,950	18,594	14,533	250,720
Jamshedpur	19,213	22,389	20,189	18,893	16,417	13,237	9,224	9,862	7,430	9,669	146,523
East Bengal	17,500	17,170	17,772	8,079	9,137	6,758	3,251	2,575	1,982	60,102	144,326
Bengaluru	19,379	12,817	10,430	8,726	8,117	6,236	6,782	28,001	5,901	7,323	113,712
Goa	13,123	13,259	10,730	9,456	11,037	8,327	8,608	7,949	10,347	9,364	102,200
Chennaiyin	12,719	11,564	7,789	9,788	8,207	11,132	8,489	5,845	5,248	6,231	87,012
Hyderabad	2,127	10,543	9,638	10,126	11,834	5,196	5,907	6,427	4,873	5,276	71,947
Odisha	5,217	6,811	7,218	7,716	7,019	4,417	5,817	4,729	6,217	6,814	61,975
Mumbai City	4,128	3,733	5,869	6,118	5,529	3,892	6,407	3,187	5,588	5,212	49,663
NorthEast United	8,627	7,315	4,867	851	561	504	683	361	401	403	24,573

Legend: Highest Lowest

==== Playoffs ====
Match	Attendance
Knockout 1 (Kanteerava)	20,301
Knockout 2 (Salt Lake)	35,256
Semi-final 1 (MFA)	6,124
Semi-final 2 (Gachibowli)	12,926
Semi-final 1 (Kanteerava)	21,901
Semi-final 2 (Salt Lake)	52,507
Final (Fatorda)	11,879
Total	160,894
Average	22,985

Last updated: 13 March 2023.
Source: worldfootball.net

== Awards ==
=== Season awards ===
Individual awards
Award	Winner	Club
Hero of the League	(India) Lallianzuala Chhangte	Mumbai City
Golden Boot	(Brazil) Diego Maurício	Odisha
Golden Glove	(India) Vishal Kaith	ATK Mohun Bagan
Emerging Player of the League	(India) Sivasakthi Narayanan	Bengaluru
KFC Street Baller of League	(Morocco) Noah Sadaoui	Goa
Club awards
Award	Winner	
Best Pitch	Kerala Blasters	
Grassroots Award	Bengaluru	
Grassroots Award	Goa	

ISL Team of the Season
Goalkeeper	(India) Vishal Kaith (ATK Mohun Bagan)			
Defenders
Defenders	(India) Rahul Bheke (Mumbai City)	(India) Pritam Kotal (ATK Mohun Bagan)	(Spain) Odei Onaindia (Hyderabad)	(India) Akash Mishra (Hyderabad)
Midfielders
Midfielders	(India) Suresh Wangjam (Bengaluru)		(Scotland) Greg Stewart (Mumbai City)	(India) Lalengmawia Ralte (Mumbai City)
Forwards
Forwards	(India) Lallianzuala Chhangte (Mumbai City)		(Brazil) Diego Maurício (Odisha)	(Morocco) Noah Sadaoui (Goa)
Head coach	(England) Des Buckingham (Mumbai City)			

=== Hero of the Month ===
Month	Hero of the Month		Ref.
Month	Player	Club	Ref.
October	(Australia) Dimitri Petratos	ATK Mohun Bagan	
November	(India) Bipin Singh Thounaojam	Mumbai City	
December	(Spain) Iker Guarrotxena	Goa	
January	(India) Lallianzuala Chhangte	Mumbai City	
February	(India) Anirudh Thapa	Chennaiyin	

=== Hero of the Match ===
Match	Hero of the Match		Match	Hero of the Match		Match	Hero of the Match	
Match	Player	Club	Match	Player	Club	Match	Player	Club
Match 1	(Ukraine) Ivan Kalyuzhnyi	Kerala Blasters	Match 40	(India) Naorem Singh	East Bengal	Match 79	(Germany) Julius Düker (2)	Chennaiyin
Match 2	(Brazil) Alan Costa	Bengaluru	Match 41	(Argentina) Jorge Pereyra Díaz	Mumbai City	Match 80	(India) Brandon Fernandes	Goa
Match 3	(Brazil) Joao Victor	Hyderabad	Match 42	(Spain) Saúl Crespo	Odisha	Match 81	(Spain) Iker Guarrotxena (3)	Goa
Match 4	(Ghana) Kwame Karikari	Chennaiyin	Match 43	(India) Chinglensana Singh	Hyderabad	Match 82	(India) Lallianzuala Chhangte (4)	Mumbai City
Match 5	(Brazil) Diego Maurício	Odisha	Match 44	(India) Ashique Kuruniyan	ATK Mohun Bagan	Match 83	(India) Sivasakthi Narayanan	Bengaluru
Match 6	(Spain) Edu Bedia	Goa	Match 45	(Croatia) Marko Lešković	Kerala Blasters	Match 84	(Australia) Dimitri Petratos (3)	ATK Mohun Bagan
Match 7	(India) Halicharan Narzary	Hyderabad	Match 46	(India) Deepak Tangri	ATK Mohun Bagan	Match 85	(Greece) Dimitrios Diamantakos (2)	Kerala Blasters
Match 8	(India) Jiteshwor Singh	Chennaiyin	Match 47	(India) Mohammad Yasir	Hyderabad	Match 86	(India) Isak Vanlalruatfela	Odisha
Match 9	(India) Mehtab Singh	Mumbai City	Match 48	(Morocco) Noah Sadaoui (2)	Goa	Match 87	(Brazil) Cleiton Silva (3)	East Bengal
Match 10	(Australia) Dimitri Petratos	ATK Mohun Bagan	Match 49	(Netherlands) Abdenasser El Khayati (2)	Chennaiyin	Match 88	(India) Akash Mishra	Hyderabad
Match 11	(Cyprus) Charalambos Kyriakou	East Bengal	Match 50	(Greece) Dimitrios Diamantakos	Kerala Blasters	Match 89	(Brazil) Rafael Crivellaro	Jamshedpur
Match 12	(Morocco) Noah Sadaoui	Goa	Match 51	(India) Narender Gahlot	Odisha	Match 90	(Spain) Javi Hernández (2)	Bengaluru
Match 13	(India) Mehtab Singh (2)	Mumbai City	Match 52	(Scotland) Greg Stewart (3)	Mumbai City	Match 91	(Spain) Saúl Crespo (2)	Odisha
Match 14	(Nigeria) Bartholomew Ogbeche	Hyderabad	Match 53	(India) Danish Farooq Bhat	Bengaluru	Match 92	(Uruguay) Adrián Luna (3)	Kerala Blasters
Match 15	(Spain) Pedro Martín	Odisha	Match 54	(India) Anwar Ali (2)	Goa	Match 93	(Brazil) Cleiton Silva (4)	East Bengal
Match 16	(India) Nandhakumar Sekar	Odisha	Match 55	(Uruguay) Adrián Luna	Kerala Blasters	Match 94	(England) Jay Emmanuel-Thomas	Jamshedpur
Match 17	(India) Mehtab Singh (3)	Mumbai City	Match 56	(Spain) Iker Guarrotxena (2)	Goa	Match 95	(India) Isak Vanlalruatfela	Odisha
Match 18	(Spain) Javier Siverio	Hyderabad	Match 57	(Nigeria) Bartholomew Ogbeche (2)	Hyderabad	Match 96	(Scotland) Greg Stewart (4)	Mumbai City
Match 19	(France) Hugo Boumous	ATK Mohun Bagan	Match 58	(India) Lallianzuala Chhangte	Mumbai City	Match 97	(India) Rohit Kumar	Bengaluru
Match 20	(England) Peter Hartley	Jamshedpur	Match 59	(Colombia) Wilmar Jordán	NorthEast United	Match 98	(India) Anirudh Thapa (2)	Chennaiyin
Match 21	(Spain) Iker Guarrotxena	Goa	Match 60	(India) Soraisam Sandeep Singh	Kerala Blasters	Match 99	(Nigeria) Bartholomew Ogbeche (4)	Hyderabad
Match 22	(India) Anirudh Thapa	Chennaiyin	Match 61	(Australia) Dimitri Petratos (2)	ATK Mohun Bagan	Match 100	(Spain) Javi Hernández (3)	Bengaluru
Match 23	(India) Nikhil Poojari	Hyderabad	Match 62	(Spain) Javier Siverio (2)	Hyderabad	Match 101	(Ghana) Kwame Karikari (2)	Chennaiyin
Match 24	(India) Rahul KP	Kerala Blasters	Match 63	(Brazil) Cleiton Silva (2)	East Bengal	Match 102	(Spain) Saúl Crespo (3)	Odisha
Match 25	(Morocco) Ahmed Jahouh	Mumbai City	Match 64	(India) Lallianzuala Chhangte (2)	Mumbai City	Match 103	(Australia) Harry Sawyer	Jamshedpur
Match 26	(Spain) Odei Onaindia	Hydrabad	Match 65	(Uruguay) Adrián Luna (2)	Kerala Blasters	Match 104	(Republic of Ireland) Carl McHugh	ATK Mohun Bagan
Match 27	(India) Subhasish Bose	ATK Mohun Bagan	Match 66	(Nigeria) Bartholomew Ogbeche (3)	Hyderabad	Match 105	(India) Naorem Mahesh Singh (2)	East Bengal
Match 28	(Brazil) Cleiton Silva	East Bengal	Match 67	(India) Suresh Wangjam	Bengaluru	Match 106	(India) Ritwik Das (2)	Jamshedpur
Match 29	(Scotland) Greg Stewart	Mumbai City	Match 68	(India) Aakash Sangwan	Chennaiyin	Match 107	(India) Sivasakthi Narayanan (2)	Bengaluru
Match 30	(Ukraine) Ivan Kalyuzhnyi (2)	Kerala Blasters	Match 69	(Brazil) Diego Maurício (2)	Odisha	Match 108	(India) Anirudh Thapa (3)	Chennaiyin
Match 31	(India) Lalengmawia Ralte	Mumbai City	Match 70	(Argentina) Jorge Pereyra Díaz (2)	Mumbai City	Match 109	(Montenegro) Slavko Damjanović	ATK Mohun Bagan
Match 32	(Spain) Pedro Martín (2)	Odisha	Match 71	(Germany) Julius Düker	Chennaiyin	Match 110	(Australia) Joel Chianese	Hyderabad
Match 33	(Netherlands) Abdenasser El Khayati	Chennaiyin	Match 72	(India) Ritwik Das	Jamshedpur	Match 111 (KO1)	(India) Sunil Chhetri	Bengaluru
Match 34	(Ukraine) Ivan Kalyuzhnyi (3)	Kerala Blasters	Match 73	(Fiji) Roy Krishna	Bengaluru	Match 112 (KO2)	(Australia) Dimitri Petratos (4)	ATK Mohun Bagan
Match 35	(India) Anwar Ali	Goa	Match 74	(India) Lallianzuala Chhangte (3)	Mumbai City	Match 113 (SF1)	(India) Prabir Das	Bengaluru
Match 36	(India) Nandhakumar Sekar (2)	Odisha	Match 75	(Colombia) Wilmar Jordán (2)	NorthEast United	Match 114 (SF2)	(Montenegro) Slavko Damjanović (2)	ATK Mohun Bagan
Match 37	(Scotland) Greg Stewart (2)	Mumbai City	Match 76	(India) Sandesh Jhingan	Bengaluru	Match 115 (SF1)	(India) Gurpreet Singh Sandhu	Bengaluru
Match 38	(Spain) Javi Hernández	Bengaluru	Match 77	(Argentina) Jorge Pereyra Díaz (3)	Mumbai City	Match 116 (SF2)	(India) Vishal Kaith	ATK Mohun Bagan
Match 39	(India) Subhasish Bose (2)	ATK Mohun Bagan	Match 78	(India) Nim Dorjee Tamang	Hyderabad	Match 117 (F)	(Australia) Dimitri Petratos (5)	ATK Mohun Bagan

== ISL Cup Playoffs ==
The ISL Cup Play-offs is a knockout tournament held after the regular league season.

- Format:
  - Top six teams from the league qualify for the play-offs.
  - The top two teams advance directly to the two-legged semi-finals.
  - Teams ranked 3rd to 6th play a single-legged knockout round, hosted by the higher-ranked team.
- Progression:
  - Winners of the knockout stage join the top two teams in the semi-finals.
  - Semi-finals are played over two legs to determine the finalists.
  - The tournament culminates in a single-leg final hosted by the higher-ranked league side to crown the ISL Cup winner.

=== Bracket ===
Knockout
4	Bengaluru (a.e.t.)	1
5	Kerala Blasters	0
3	ATK Mohun Bagan	2
6	Odisha	0

Semifinals
1	Mumbai City	0	2	2 (8)
4	Bengaluru (p)	1	1	2 (9)
2	Hyderabad	0	0	0 (3)
3	ATK Mohun Bagan (p)	0	0	0 (4)

Finals
4	Bengaluru	2 (3)
3	ATK Mohun Bagan (p)	2 (4)

=== Knockout ===
Team 1	Score	Team 2
Bengaluru	1–0 (a.e.t.)	Kerala Blasters
ATK Mohun Bagan	2–0	Odisha

=== Semi-finals ===
Team 1	Agg.	Team 2	1st leg	2nd leg
Mumbai City	2–2 (8–9 p)	Bengaluru	0–1	2–1 (a.e.t.)
Hyderabad	0–0 (4–3 p)	ATK Mohun Bagan	0–0	0–0 (a.e.t.)

=== Final ===
18 March 2023
19:30 IST

ATK Mohun Bagan	2–2 (a.e.t.)	Bengaluru
D. Petratos 14' (pen.), 85' (pen.)	Report	Chhetri 45+4' (pen.); Krishna 78'
Penalties
D. Petratos (penalty scored); Liston (penalty scored); Kiyan (penalty scored); Manvir (penalty scored)	4–3	(penalty scored) Alan Costa; (penalty scored) Krishna; (penalty missed) B. Ramires; (penalty scored) Chhetri; (penalty missed) Pérez

Fatorda Stadium, Margao
Attendance: 11,879
Referee: Harish Kundu

== See also ==
- 2023–24 AFC competitions qualifiers
- 2022–23 I-League
- 2022–23 I-League 2
- 2023 Super Cup
- 2022 Durand Cup
