= Isak Vanlalruatfela =

Indian footballer

Personal information
- Full name: Isak Vanlalruatfela
- Date of birth: 19 May 2001 (age 25)
- Place of birth: Mizoram, India
- Height: 1.72 m (5 ft 8 in)
- Position: Winger

Team information
- Current team: Goa
- Number: 19

Youth career
- Redstar Football Academy
- 2017–2018: Bengaluru

Senior career*
Years	Team	Apps	(Gls)
2018–2020	Aizawl	19	(3)
2020–2026	Odisha	72	(10)
2026–	Goa	2	(0)

International career^{‡}
2024	India U23	1	(0)
- * Club domestic league appearances and goals as of 28 October 2026 ‡ National team caps and goals as of 22:30, 22 March 2024 (UTC)

Isak Vanlalruatfela (born 19 May 2001) is an Indian professional footballer who plays as a forward for Indian Super League club Goa.

== Club career ==
Isak played in the NECS Cup for Bawngkawn LC, and was later moved up to Bengaluru FC, in 2018/19 season he was signed by Aizawl F.C. from Electric Veng FC. He made his professional debut for the Aizawl against Chennai City F.C. on 16 November 2018, He was brought in as substitute in the 69th minute as Aizawl lost 1–2.

On 24 June 2020, Isak joined Indian Super League club Odisha FC. He scored his first league goal on 30 November 2021 in a thrilling 6–4 win over SC East Bengal.

== International career ==
On 7 March 2024, Vanlalruatfela received first call-up to the national squad of India as one of the 35 probables by head coach Igor Štimac, for the both home and away games against Afghanistan in round 2 of the 2026 FIFA World Cup qualifiers.

== Career statistics ==
=== Club ===
As of 12 December 2024

Appearances and goals by club, season and competition
Club	Season	League			National Cup (Note: Includes Super Cup)		AFC		Other		Total	
Club	Season	Division	Apps	Goals	Apps	Goals	Apps	Goals	Apps	Goals	Apps	Goals
Aizawl	2018–19	I-League	12	2	0	0	—		—		12	2
Aizawl	2019–20	I-League	7	1	0	0	—		—		7	1
Aizawl	Total		19	3	0	0	0	0	0	0	19	3
Odisha	2020–21	Indian Super League	2	0	0	0	—		—		2	0
Odisha	2021–22	Indian Super League	5	1	0	0	—		—		5	1
Odisha	2022–23	Indian Super League	10	2	4	0	—		5 (Note: Appearance(s) in Durand Cup)	1	19	3
Odisha	2023–24	Indian Super League	24	4	5	1	7 (Note: Appearance(s) in AFC Cup)	2	—		36	7
Odisha	2024–25	Indian Super League	12	1	0	0	—		—		12	1
Odisha	Total		53	8	9	1	7	2	5	1	74	12
Career total			72	11	9	1	7	2	5	1	93	15

== Honours ==
Odisha

- Super Cup: 2023; runner-up: 2024

Individual

- Super Cup Player of the Tournament: 2024
- Indian Super League Emerging Player of the Month: February 2023, December 2023
