= 2018–19 Delhi Dynamos FC season =

2018–19 season of Delhi Dynamos FC

Delhi Dynamos
2018–19 season
- Owner: (United States) GMS Inc.
- Head Coach: none
- Stadium: Jawaharlal Nehru Stadium
- Indian Super League: 8th
- Super Cup: Quarter-finals

The 2018–19 Delhi Dynamos FC Season was the club's fifth season in the Indian Super League since their establishment in 2014. This was also the club's last season as Delhi Dynamos FC before relocating to Odisha to get rebranded as Odisha FC.

== Pre-season and friendlies ==
This time, the Delhi Dynamos will do their pre-season in two phases. In the first phase, they will train in Kolkata to get accustomed to Indian conditions. After that, they will go to Doha to train at Aspire Academy for their final preparation before Indian Super League.

On 16 August 2018, they started their first phase of pre-season with Indian players in Kolkata under the watchful eyes of assistant coach Mridul Banerjee. They played two friendly games with local clubs Taltala Dipti Sangha and Peerless SC, beating both clubs comfortably by 3-0 and 4-0 respectively.

On 5 September 2018, They flew to Doha to train at Aspire Academy. Where they played three friendly games with local UAE clubs.

25 August 2018 Friendly	Delhi Dynamos FC	3–0	Taltala Dipti Sangha	Bidhannagar, Kolkata
15:00 IST	Das; Romeo; Manchong	Report		Stadium: Training Ground, Salt Lake Stadium

31 August 2018 Friendly	Delhi Dynamos FC	4–0	Peerless SC	Bidhannagar, Kolkata
15:00 IST	Andrija Kaluđerović; Romeo; Shubham Sarangi	Report		Stadium: Training Ground, Salt Lake Stadium

8 September 2018 Friendly	Delhi Dynamos FC	1–1	Al Shamal SC	Doha, Qatar
20:00 IST	Andrija Kaluđerović	Report	Goal	Stadium: Aspire Academy Ground

27 September 2018 3	Delhi Dynamos FC	3–3	Minerva Punjab	New Delhi
16:00 IST	Kaluđerović 27', 57'; Romeo 84'	Report	Alex 4'; Yu Kuboki 87'; Dilliram 90+1'	Stadium: Jawaharlal Nehru Stadium Training Pitch

== Players ==
=== Current squad ===
As of 15 August 2018

Note: Flags indicate national team as defined under FIFA eligibility rules; some limited exceptions apply. Players may hold more than one non-FIFA nationality.

No.	Pos.	Nation	Player
1	GK	IND	Albino Gomes
31	GK	IND	Sukhdev Patil
13	GK	ESP	Francisco Dorronsoro
51	DF	NED	Gianni Zuiverloon
–24	DF	ESP	Martí Crespí
3	DF	IND	Narayan Das
13	DF	IND	Mohammad Sajid Dhot
26	DF	IND	Rana Gharami
16	MF	IND	Vinit Rai
6	MF	IND	Bikramjeet Singh

No.	Pos.	Nation	Player
—	MF	IND	Pradeep Mohanraj
11	MF	ESP	Adrià Carmona
8	MF	ESP	Marcos Tebar
10	MF	SVN	Rene Mihelič
2	MF	IND	Nanda Kumar
19	MF	IND	Romeo Fernandes
7	FW	IND	Lallianzuala Chhangte
17	FW	IND	Shubham Sarangi
18	FW	IND	Daniel Lalhlimpuia

== Indian Super League ==
=== Table ===
Pos	Team	Pld	W	D	L	GF	GA	GD	Pts
6	ATK	18	6	6	6	18	22	−4	24
7	Pune City	18	6	4	8	24	30	−6	22
8	Delhi Dynamos	18	4	6	8	23	27	−4	18
9	Kerala Blasters	18	2	9	7	18	28	−10	15
10	Chennaiyin	18	2	3	13	16	32	−16	9

Source: Indian Super League
Rules for classification: 1) points; 2) head-to-head points; 3) head-to-head goal difference; 4) head-to-head goals scored; 5) goal difference; 5) number of goals scored; 6) fair play ranking; 6) drawing of lots
