= Isaac Vanmalsawma =

Indian footballer (born 1996)

Personal information
- Full name: Issac Vanmalsawma Chhakchhuak
- Date of birth: 15 September 1996 (age 30)
- Place of birth: Lunglei, Mizoram, India
- Height: 1.69 m (5 ft 6 1/2 in)
- Position: Central midfielder

Youth career
- 2012–2014: AIFF Elite Academy

Senior career*
Years	Team	Apps	(Gls)
2014–2017	Shillong Lajong	24	(3)
2017–2018	Pune City	12	(0)
2018–2019	Chennaiyin	13	(1)
2019–2021	Jamshedpur	25	(1)
2021–2024	Odisha	40	(1)
2024	Punjab	0	(0)
2024–2026	SC Delhi	20	(0)

International career
2013	India U19	3	(0)
2016–	India	1	(0)
- * Club domestic league appearances and goals as of 17:24, 19 March 2026 (IST)

Issac Vanmalsawma Chhakchhuak (born 15 September 1996) is an Indian professional footballer who plays as a midfielder.

== Club career ==
=== Shillong Lajong ===
In 2014, Isaac signed on the dotted lines for Shillong lajong. In 2015–16 I-League season he was registered with senior team and there he has played 5 matches in entire season.

==== 2016–17 season ====
In 2016–17 I-League season, Lajong coach Thangboi Singto used Isaac as offensive midfielder and sometimes as a right winger. He played all matches and scored on two occasions. Isaac was instrumental part of Shillong Lajong squad which showed decent performance throughout 2016–17 season.

=== Pune City ===
On 23 July 2017, Isaac has been picked up by FC Pune City for 2017–18 ISL season.

=== Chennaiyin ===
In June 2018, Isaac has signed with Chennaiyin for two-year deal. Issac scored his maiden goal in ISL with the Marina Machans against ATK.

== International career ==
=== Youth ===
In October 2013, Isaac went to Qatar to represent India U19 in AFC U19 Championship Qualifiers. Where he played all 3 matches under coach Colm Toal.

=== Senior ===
Isaac has been included in the national team setup since a very young age and is a very versatile player, playing either on the wing or as offensive midfielder. He made his India debut against Bhutan. Isaac was called for India senior team camp for AFC Asian Cup Qualifiers match against Kyrgyzstan.

== Career statistics ==
=== Club ===
As of 13 April 2023

Club	Season	League			Cup		AFC		Total	
Club	Season	Division	Apps	Goals	Apps	Goals	Apps	Goals	Apps	Goals
Shillong Lajong	2015–16	I-League	6	1	0	0	–		6	1
Shillong Lajong	2016–17	I-League	18	2	2 (Note: Appearance(s) in Federation Cup)	0	–		20	2
Shillong Lajong	Total		24	3	2	0	0	0	26	3
Pune City	2017–18	Indian Super League	12	0	1 (Note: Appearance(s) in Super Cup)	0	–		13	0
Chennaiyin	2018–19	Indian Super League	13	1	1	0	6 (Note: Appearance(s) in AFC Cup)	1	20	2
Jamshedpur	2019–20	Indian Super League	9	1	–		–		9	1
Jamshedpur	2020–21	Indian Super League	16	0	–		–		16	0
Jamshedpur	Total		25	1	0	0	0	0	25	1
Odisha	2021–22	Indian Super League	20	0	–		–		20	0
Odisha	2022–23	Indian Super League	20	1	4 (Note: Appearance(s) in Durand Cup)	1	–		24	1
Odisha	Total		40	1	4	1	0	0	44	2
Punjab	2023–24	Indian Super League	–		–		–		–	
Hyderabad FC	2024-25	Indian Super League	6	0	–		–		6	0
Career total			120	6	7	1	6	1	133	8
