= Nandhakumar Sekar =

Indian footballer

Personal information
- Full name: Nandhakumar Sekar
- Date of birth: 20 December 1995 (age 30)
- Place of birth: Chennai, Tamil Nadu, India
- Height: 1.73 m (5 ft 8 in)
- Position: Winger

Team information
- Current team: Odisha

Youth career
- 2014–2017: Hindustan Eagles

Senior career*
Years	Team	Apps	(Gls)
2017–2018	Chennai City	6	(2)
2017–2018	→ Delhi Dynamos (loan)	9	(1)
2018–2023	Odisha	73	(9)
2023–2026	East Bengal	47	(8)
2026–	Odisha	2	(0)

International career^{‡}
2017–2018	India U23	5	(0)
2023–	India	6	(0)
Medal record
Men's football
Representing India
SAFF Championship
Winner	2023 India
- * Club domestic league appearances and goals as of 17 october 2026 ‡ National team caps and goals as of 14:50, 9 September 2024 (UTC)

Nandhakumar Sekar (born 20 December 1995) is an Indian professional footballer who plays as a forward for Indian Super League club Odisha and the India national team.

== Career ==
Sekar made his professional debut in the I-League with Chennai City on 19 February 2017 against Shillong Lajong. He started the match and played 51 minutes as Chennai City lost 4–1. He scored his first professional goal for the club on 12 March 2017 against East Bengal. He scored the equalizing goal for Chennai City in the 57th minute which eventually led to the team winning 2–1.

=== Odisha ===
On 17 August 2022, Sekar scored a stunning goal assisted by goalkeeper Lalthuammawia Ralte in the season opener against NorthEast United in the Durand Cup, which ended in a thumping 6–0 win.

=== East Bengal ===
On 10 June 2023, it was announced that Sekar joined East Bengal on a three-year contract.

== International career ==
He made his international debut for Indian U23 national team in a friendly against Singapore U23.

After his successful domestic spell with Odisha, Sekar was called up to senior national team in May 2023, for Hero Intercontinental Cup and SAFF Championship. Sekar made his debut for the senior team against Vanuatu on 12 June 2023.

== Career statistics ==
=== Club ===
As of matches played 21 August 2024

Appearances and goals by club, season and competition
Club	Season	League			Cup (Note: Includes Federation Cup, Super Cup and Durand Cup.)		AFC		Other		Total	
Club	Season	Division	Apps	Goals	Apps	Goals	Apps	Goals	Apps	Goals	Apps	Goals
Chennai City	2016–17	I-League	6	2	3	0	—		—		9	2
Odisha (loan)	2017–18	Indian Super League	9	1	1	0	—		—		10	1
Odisha	2018–19	Indian Super League	14	2	3	1	—		—		17	3
Odisha	2019–20	Indian Super League	16	0	0	0	—		—		16	0
Odisha	2020–21	Indian Super League	11	0	0	0	—		—		11	0
Odisha	2021–22	Indian Super League	12	1	0	0	—		—		12	1
Odisha	2022–23	Indian Super League	20	6	10 (Note: Five appearances and one goal in Durand Cup, and five appearances and four goals in Super Cup.)	5	1 (Note: One appearance in Qualification for the AFC Cup group stage)	0	—		31	11
Odisha	Odisha total		82	10	9	6	0	0	6	1	97	16
East Bengal	2023–24	Indian Super League	19	5	11 (Note: Six Appearances and two goals in Durand Cup and five appearances and two goals in Super Cup.)	4	—		1 (Note: One Appearance in the Calcutta Football League.)	1	31	10
East Bengal	2024–25	Indian Super League	0	0	1 (Note: One Appearance and one goal in Durand Cup.)	1	1 (Note: One Appearance in AFC Champions League Two.)	0	0	0	2	1
East Bengal	East Bengal total		19	5	12	5	1	0	1	1	33	11
Career total			107	17	24	11	2	0	7	1	140	29

=== International ===
As of match played 9 September 2024

Appearances and goals by national team and year
National team	Year	Apps	Goals
India	2023	3	0
India	2024	3	0
Total		6	0

== Honours ==
Hindustan Eagles

- Chennai Football League: 2014–15

Odisha

- Super Cup: 2023

East Bengal

- Indian Super League: 2025-26
- Super Cup: 2024
- Durand Cup runner-up: 2023

India

- SAFF Championship: 2023
- Intercontinental Cup: 2023

Individual

- Most Valuable Player of Durand Cup: 2023
