= Aridai Cabrera =

Spanish footballer

Aridai
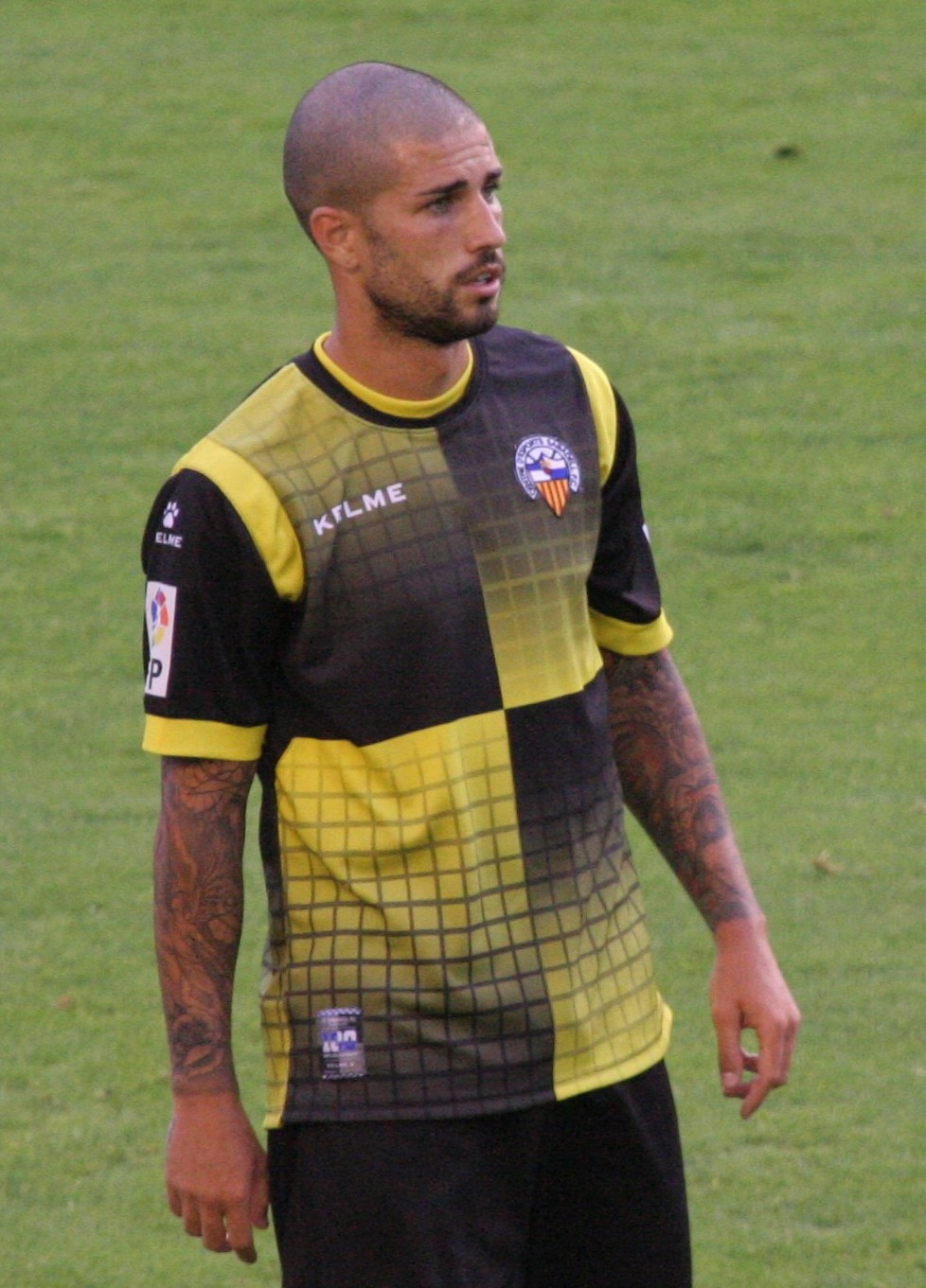
- Aridai with Sabadell in 2014

Personal information
- Full name: Aridai Cabrera Suárez
- Date of birth: 26 September 1988 (age 38)
- Place of birth: Las Palmas, Spain
- Height: 1.72 m (5 ft 8 in)
- Position: Winger

Team information
- Current team: San Fernando

Youth career
- Universidad LP

Senior career*
Years	Team	Apps	(Gls)
2006–2007	Universidad LP B	26	(14)
2007–2010	Universidad LP	62	(12)
2010–2012	Mallorca B	52	(10)
2012–2013	Girona	9	(0)
2013	Betis B	14	(4)
2013–2014	Hospitalet	34	(10)
2014–2015	Sabadell	17	(0)
2015	Huracán	30	(4)
2016–2017	Valencia B	47	(20)
2017–2018	Cultural Leonesa	19	(3)
2018–2020	Mallorca	53	(11)
2020–2021	Las Palmas	34	(3)
2021–2022	Odisha	17	(5)
2022–2023	Inter d'Escaldes	23	(8)
2024	Villa Santa Brígida	12	(3)
2024–	San Fernando	0	(0)
- * Club domestic league appearances and goals as of 10 May 2024

Aridai Cabrera Suárez (born 26 September 1988), known simply as Aridai, is a Spanish professional footballer who plays as a winger for San Fernando.

== Club career ==
Born in Las Palmas, Canary Islands, Aridai began his career with hometown club Universidad de Las Palmas CF, going on to spend three full seasons in the Segunda División B with the team. In June 2010 he joined RCD Mallorca, being assigned to the B side in the same level.

On 12 July 2012, Aridai signed a two-year contract with Girona FC of Segunda División. He made his league debut on 18 August against CE Sabadell FC, playing 11 minutes in a 0–0 home draw.

Aridai moved to Real Betis on 25 January 2013, initially being part of the reserves, but subsequently moved to fellow league team CE L'Hospitalet in the summer. After scoring ten goals for the latter, he agreed to a deal at second-tier Sabadell.

On 27 January 2015, Aridai terminated his contract and signed with Huracán Valencia CF of the third division hours later. That December, amidst financial problems that would lead to his team being expelled, he quit and moved across the city to Valencia CF Mestalla in the same league.

On 5 July 2017, after scoring a career-best 15 goals during the campaign, Aridai signed for Cultural y Deportiva Leonesa. The following 18 January, he moved to RCD Mallorca in the third tier. After two consecutive play-off promotions to La Liga, he made his debut in the competition on 29 September 2019, shortly after turning 31; he replaced Lago Junior for the final 13 minutes of a 2–0 loss at Deportivo Alavés.

Aridai returned to his native city on 13 January 2020, with the free agent joining UD Las Palmas on a two-and-a-half-year deal. He moved abroad for the first time in August 2021 at the age of 33, agreeing to a contract at Odisha FC. He made his Indian Super League debut on 24 November, scoring in the 3–1 home win over Bengaluru FC.
