= Thoiba Singh Moirangthem =

Indian footballer

Thoiba Singh
Personal information
- Full name: Thoiba Singh Moirangthem
- Date of birth: 12 December 2002 (age 23)
- Place of birth: Moirang, Manipur, India
- Height: 1.70 m (5 ft 7 in)
- Positions: Defensive midfielder; centre-back

Team information
- Current team: Odisha
- Number: 24

Youth career
- AMOFA Academy

Senior career*
Years	Team	Apps	(Gls)
2018–2020	Minerva Punjab	16	(1)
2019–2020	Minerva Punjab B	1	(0)
2020–	Odisha	74	(1)

International career^{‡}
2017–2018	India U16	31	(2)
2018–2019	India U17	2	(0)
2023–2024	India U23	4	(1)
- * Club domestic league appearances and goals as of 18:33, 20 March 2026 (UTC) ‡ National team caps and goals as of 18:46, 25 March 2024 (UTC)

Thoiba Singh Moirangthem (Meitei: Moirangthem Thoiba Singh, born 12 December 2002) is an Indian professional footballer who plays as a midfielder for Indian Super League club Odisha.

== Club career ==
=== Minerva Punjab ===
Thoiba became the youngest player to make a first team debut in Indian football League system at the age of 15. He is also the youngest goalscorer at the AFC Cup, scoring a goal at the age of 16, for Minerva Punjab against Nepali side Manang Marshyangdi in their 1–1 tie on 15 May 2019.

=== Odisha ===
He became part of Odisha team in both the Indian Super League and AFC Cup.

== International career ==
On 11 November 2024, Thoiba replaced the injured Anirudh Thapa in the national squad camp ahead of India national team's friendly against Malaysia.

== Personal life ==
Thoiba was born in Moirang, Manipur. His father was an athlete. His family had always supported his passion for football and were there for him throughout. He used to play with a pomelo because his family could not afford a proper football. He idolises Portuguese forward Cristiano Ronaldo.

== Career statistics ==
=== Club ===
As of 12 December 2024

Club	Season	League			Cup		AFC		Total	
Club	Season	Division	Apps	Goals	Apps	Goals	Apps	Goals	Apps	Goals
Minerva Punjab	2018–19	I-League	7	0	0	0	7 (Note: Appearance(s) in AFC Champions League) (Note: Appearance(s) in AFC Cup)	1	14	1
Minerva Punjab	2019–20	I-League	9	1	0	0	—		9	1
Minerva Punjab	Total		16	1	0	0	7	1	23	2
Minerva Punjab B	2020	I-League 2nd Division	1	0	0	0	—		1	0
Odisha	2020–21	Indian Super League	1	0	0	0	—		1	0
Odisha	2021–22	Indian Super League	18	0	0	0	—		18	0
Odisha	2022–23	Indian Super League	21	0	10 (Note: Appearance(s) in Durand Cup) (Note: Appearance(s) in Super Cup)	1	1 (Note: Appearance in playoff of AFC Cup)	0	32	1
Odisha	2023–24	Indian Super League	8	0	0	0	3	0	11	0
Odisha	2024–25	Indian Super League	10	0	0	0	—		10	0
Odisha	Total		58	0	10	1	4	0	72	1
Career total			75	1	10	1	11	1	96	3
