= George D'Souza =

Indian footballer

Personal information
- Full name: George Ricardo D'Souza
- Date of birth: 30 April 1994 (age 32)
- Place of birth: Goa, India
- Height: 1.74 m (5 ft 9 in)
- Position: Left-back

Team information
- Current team: Malappuram FC
- Number: 32

Youth career
- 2010–2016: Sesa Football Academy

Senior career*
Years	Team	Apps	(Gls)
2016–2020	Sporting Clube de Goa	20	(4)
2020–2021	Odisha	2	(0)
2021–2022	→ Bengaluru United (loan)		
2022–2024	Churchill Brothers		
- * Club domestic league appearances and goals

George Ricardo D'Souza (born 30 April 1994) is an Indian professional footballer who plays as a left-back.

== Early life ==
D'Souza was born on 30 April 1994 in Goa. D'souza started his youth career from Sanquelim based academy, Sesa Football Academy in 2010.

== Career ==
=== Sporting Clube de Goa ===
D'Souza began his senior career by signing for the goan club Sporting Clube de Goa in 2016. He represented for the club in Goa Professional League. D'Souza made 20 appearances for the club and scored four goals and assisted three before leaving for Odisha FC.

=== Odisha FC ===
On 3 June 2020, D'Souza signed for the Indian Super League club Odisha FC on a two-year contract. D'Souza made his debut for the club on 6 December 2020 against Mumbai City FC which they lost 2–0. He was included in starting eleven on his debut match. He played his second and last match of the season on 27 February 2021 in the all-time highest scoring game in the history of Indian Super League against SC East Bengal, where they won with a jaw dropping score of 6–5.

==== FC Bengaluru United (loan) ====
On 12 July 2021, it was announced that D'Souza was loaned to I-League 2nd Division club FC Bengaluru United for the 2021–22 season.

== Career statistics ==
As of 14 July 2021

Appearances and goals by club, season and competition
Club	Season	League			Federation Cup/Super Cup		Durand Cup		AFC		Total	
Club	Season	Division	Apps	Goals	Apps	Goals	Apps	Goals	Apps	Goals	Apps	Goals
Sporting Clube de Goa	2016–17	Goa Professional League	20	4	–	–	–	–	–	–	20	4
Sporting Clube de Goa	2017-18	Goa Professional League	20	4	–	–	–	–	–	–	20	4
Sporting Clube de Goa	2018–19	Goa Professional League	20	4	–	–	–	–	–	–	20	4
Sporting Clube de Goa	2019–20	Goa Professional League	20	4	–	–	–	–	–	–	20	4
Sporting Clube de Goa	Total		20	4	–	–	–	–	–	–	20	4
Odisha	2020–21	Indian Super League	2	0	–	–	–	–	–	–	2	0
FC Bengaluru United (loan)	2021–22	I-League 2nd Division	–	–	–	–	–	–	–	–	–	–
Total			22	4	–	–	–	–	–	–	22	4

== Honours ==
India U20 (Goa India)

- Lusofonia Games Gold medal: 2014
