= Héctor Rodas =

Spanish footballer

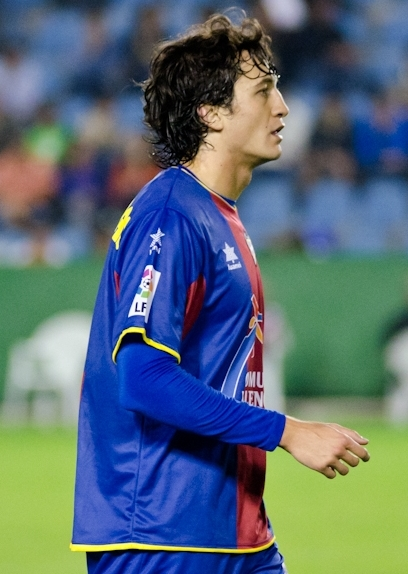
- Rodas with Levante in 2011

Personal information
- Full name: Héctor Rodas Ramírez
- Date of birth: 7 March 1988 (age 38)
- Place of birth: Valencia, Spain
- Height: 1.90 m (6 ft 3 in)
- Position: Centre-back

Youth career
- 2005–2007: Levante

Senior career*
Years	Team	Apps	(Gls)
2007–2009	Levante B	51	(5)
2009–2015	Levante	64	(1)
2012	→ Elche (loan)	15	(2)
2015	Betis	5	(0)
2015–2017	Córdoba	61	(2)
2017–2018	Cercle Brugge	5	(2)
2018–2019	Alcorcón	13	(0)
2019–2021	Cultural Leonesa	45	(4)
2021–2022	Odisha	15	(2)
2022–2023	Atlético Saguntino	14	(1)
Total		288	(19)
- * Club domestic league appearances and goals

Héctor Rodas Ramírez (born 7 March 1988) is a Spanish former professional footballer who played as a central defender.

== Club career ==
Born in Valencia, Valencian Community, Rodas finished his development at local Levante UD, and made his senior debut with the reserves, spending several years with them in the lower leagues. On 30 May 2009, he appeared in his first official game with the first team, starting in a 1–0 home win over Rayo Vallecano in the Segunda División.

In the 2009–10 season, Rodas played 22 matches for the Granotas, who returned to La Liga after a two-year absence. He made his debut in the top flight on 28 August 2010, featuring the entire 1–4 home loss against Sevilla FC.

After playing only once in the first half of the 2011–12 campaign, a 3–1 defeat at Deportivo de La Coruña in the Copa del Rey in which he was also sent off, Rodas was loaned to neighbouring Elche CF in January 2012. Returned to Levante, he made 21 competitive appearances in 2012–13, including eight in the team's round-of-16 run in the UEFA Europa League.

On 28 January 2015, Rodas terminated his contract with the club, and signed with Real Betis of the second tier two days later. After appearing rarely, he moved to Córdoba CF in the same league on 27 June.

Rodas joined Cercle Brugge KSV of the Belgian First Division B on a two-year contract on 11 July 2017. He returned to his country after only one season, however, going on to represent AD Alcorcón and Cultural y Deportiva Leonesa.

On 11 August 2021, Rodas signed a one-year deal with Indian Super League side Odisha FC. He made his league debut on 24 November against Bengaluru FC in a 3–1 win, scoring a brace the following week in the 6–4 victory over SC East Bengal.

== Career statistics ==
As of 4 March 2022

Appearances and goals by club, season and competition
Club	Season	League			National Cup		Continental		Other		Total	
Club	Season	Division	Apps	Goals	Apps	Goals	Apps	Goals	Apps	Goals	Apps	Goals
Levante	2007–08	La Liga	0	0	0	0	—		—		0	0
Levante	2008–09	Segunda División	4	0	0	0	—		—		4	0
Levante	2009–10	Segunda División	22	1	1	0	—		—		23	1
Levante	2010–11	La Liga	5	0	1	0	—		—		6	0
Levante	2011–12	La Liga	0	0	1	0	—		—		1	0
Levante	2012–13	La Liga	10	0	3	0	8 (Note: Appearances in UEFA Europa League)	0	—		21	0
Levante	2013–14	La Liga	16	0	1	0	—		—		17	0
Levante	2014–15	La Liga	7	0	3	0	—		—		10	0
Levante	Total		64	1	10	0	8	0	0	0	82	1
Elche (loan)	2011–12	Segunda División	15	2	—		—		—		15	2
Betis	2014–15	Segunda División	5	0	0	0	—		—		5	0
Córdoba	2015–16	Segunda División	33	0	0	0	—		2 (Note: Appearances in promotion play-offs)	0	35	0
Córdoba	2016–17	Segunda División	28	2	2	0	—		—		30	2
Córdoba	Total		61	2	2	0	0	0	2	0	65	0
Cercle Brugge	2017–18	First Division B	5	2	0	0	—		—		5	2
Alcorcón	2018–19	Segunda División	13	0	2	0	—		—		15	0
Alcorcón	2019–20	Segunda División	0	0	0	0	—		—		0	0
Alcorcón	Total		13	0	2	0	0	0	0	0	15	0
Cultural Leonesa	2019–20	Segunda División B	24	2	1	0	—		1	0	26	2
Cultural Leonesa	2020–21	Segunda División B	21	2	0	0	—		—		21	2
Cultural Leonesa	Total		45	4	1	0	0	0	1	0	47	4
Odisha	2021–22	Indian Super League	15	2	–		–		–		15	2
Career total			223	13	15	0	8	0	3	0	249	13

== Honours ==
Betis

- Segunda División: 2014–15

Cercle Brugge

- Belgian Second Division: 2017–18
