= Sebastian Thangmuansang =

Indian footballer (born 1998)

Personal information
- Date of birth: 25 July 1998 (age 28)
- Place of birth: Churachandpur, Manipur, India
- Position: Right back

Team information
- Current team: Gokulam Kerala
- Number: 27

Youth career
- Pune FC Academy
- Pune City

Senior career*
Years	Team	Apps	(Gls)
2018	Pune City B	4	(0)
2017–2018	→ Chennai City (loan)	12	(0)
2018–2019	NEROCA	17	(0)
2019–2021	Gokulam Kerala	23	(0)
2021–2023	Odisha	5	(0)
2023	→ Mohammedan (loan)	11	(0)
2023-2024	Churchill Brothers FC Goa	18	(3)
2024-	Gokulam Kerala	13	(0)
- * Club domestic league appearances and goals as of 14:39, 17 February 2025 (AEST)

Sebastian Thangmuansang (born 25 July 1998) is an Indian professional footballer who plays as a defender for I-League club Gokulam Kerala.

== Career ==
=== Early career ===
Born in Churachandpur, Manipur, Thangmuansang started playing football at the age of five. In August 2014, he joined the Pune F.C. Academy (soon turned into the Pune City Academy). After spending time with the youth academy, Thangmuansang was loaned to Chennai City of the I-League.

Thangmuansang made his competitive senior debut for the club on 4 December 2017 against Gokulam Kerala. He started and played the whole 90 minutes as Chennai City drew the match 1–1.

=== NEROCA ===
On 17 June 2018, it was announced that Thangmuansang signed for NEROCA in the I-League. He made his debut for the club on 7 November 2018 in a league match against Aizawl. He started the match and earned a yellow card in the 88th minute as NEROCA drew 0–0.

=== Gokulam Kerala ===
On 1 August 2019, it was announced that Sebastian signed for Gokulam Kerala FC. He was part of Gokulam Kerala's 2019 Durand Cup winning squad and 2020–21 I-League title winning squad.

=== Odisha ===
On 14 May 2021, Sebastian joined Indian Super League club Odisha FC on a two-year contract.

== Career statistics ==
As of 27 March 2021

Club	Season	League			Cup		Continental		Total	
Club	Season	Division	Apps	Goals	Apps	Goals	Apps	Goals	Apps	Goals
Pune City	2017–18	ISL	0	0	0	0	—	—	0	0
Chennai City (loan)	2017–18	I-League	12	0	1	0	—	—	13	0
NEROCA	2018–19	I-League	17	0	0	0	—	—	17	0
Gokulam Kerala FC	2019–20	I-League	7	0	4 (Note: Appearances in Durand Cup)	0	4 (Note: Appearances in Sheikh Kamal International Club Cup)	0	15	0
Gokulam Kerala FC	2020–21	I-League	11	0	3 (Note: Appearances in IFA Shield)	0	0	0	14	0
Gokulam Kerala FC	total		18	0	7	0	4	0	29	0
Career total			47	0	8	0	4	0	59	0

== Honours ==
=== Club ===
Gokulam Kerala

- Durand Cup: 2019
- I-League: 2020–21
