= Diego Maurício =

Brazilian footballer (born 1991)

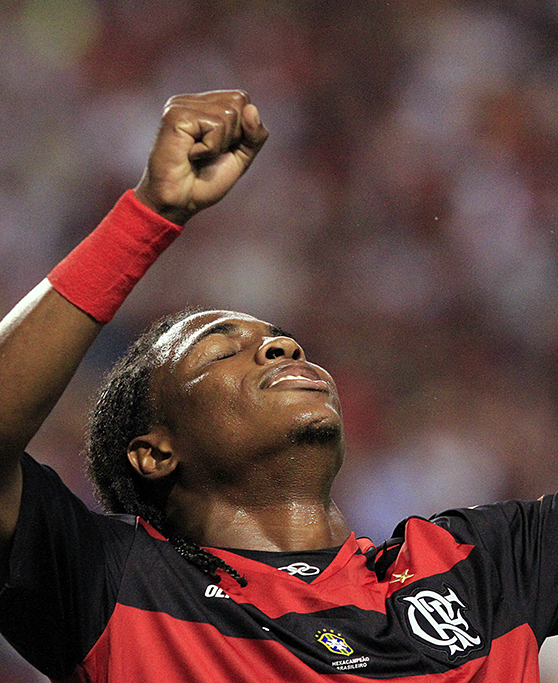
- Maurício with Flamengo in 2010

Personal information
- Full name: Diego Maurício Machado de Brito
- Date of birth: 25 June 1991 (age 35)
- Place of birth: Rio de Janeiro, Brazil
- Height: 1.83 m (6 ft 0 in)
- Position: Striker

Team information
- Current team: Rajasthan United

Youth career
- 2006–2010: Flamengo

Senior career*
Years	Team	Apps	(Gls)
2010–2012	Flamengo	55	(6)
2012–2013	Alania Vladikavkaz	12	(0)
2013	→ Sport Recife (loan)	5	(0)
2014–2015	Vitória	4	(0)
2015–2018	Bragantino	13	(2)
2015	→ Al Qadsiah (loan)	5	(0)
2016	→ Shijiazhuang Ever Bright (loan)	25	(4)
2017–2018	→ Gangwon (loan)	71	(20)
2019	Busan IPark	21	(6)
2020	CSA	1	(0)
2020–2021	Odisha	20	(12)
2021–2022	Al-Shahania	6	(6)
2022	Mumbai City	7	(3)
2022–2025	Odisha	66	(32)
2025–2026	Persebaya Surabaya	7	(0)
2026	Semen Padang	9	(1)
2026–	Rajasthan United	0	(0)

International career
2011	Brazil U20	11	(3)
- * Club domestic league appearances and goals as of 3 May 2026

Diego Maurício Machado de Brito (born 25 June 1991) is a Brazilian professional footballer who plays as a forward for Indian Football League club Rajasthan United.

== Club career ==
After working in the club's youth team with coach Rogério Lourenço for several years, in 2010 he got promoted to the professional team by the same coach. He debuted for Flamengo on May 23, 2010, in a 3–1 win against Grêmio Prudente, at Maracanã Stadium, as a substitute and suffered a penalty in the final minutes.

Diego scored his first professional goal on July 21, 2010, in a 1–1 draw against Avaí, at Maracanã Stadium.

Flamengo's president, Patricia Amorim, declined a €6 million offer from Shaktar Donetsk for the player in May 2011.

On August 14, 2012, Russian club Alania Vladikavkaz signed Diego Maurício from Flamengo for €2,8 million. After A loan spell back at Brazil, he signed for top division Portuguese club Vitória F.C. in July 2014.

Before the 2016 season opening, he joined to Ratchaburi F.C. in Thai Premier League, by trained with the club for about one month, but has moved away without cause.

=== Odisha ===
On 31 August 2020, Indian Super League club Odisha signed Maurício ahead of the seventh edition of the Indian top-tier league, on a one-year deal.

On 23 November, Maurício made his debut for the club in the Indian Super League against Hyderabad, in a narrow 1–0 defeat. He scored a brace six days later, against Jamshedpur, which ended in a thrilling 2–2 draw. He grabbed the headlines in the second half, pulling one back in the 77th-minute before driving home a stunning injury-time equaliser.

He registered 12 goals along with two assists for the club. The forward was often the lone shining star in an otherwise below-par Juggernauts’ set-up. He finished third in the race for the Golden Boot, behind Goa's Igor Angulo and ATK Mohun Bagan's Roy Krishna.

=== Mumbai City ===
On 21 January 2022, Indian Super League club Mumbai City announced the signing of Maurício as a replacement for Ygor Catatau, on a short-term deal.

On 3 February, Maurício made his debut for the club in the Indian Super League against ATK Mohun Bagan, in a 1–1 draw. He had a forgettable debut for the Islanders and was taken off for Igor Angulo, in the second half. On 17 February, he scored his first goal for the club, against Jamshedpur in a 3–2 defeat, through the penalty spot.

He was later included in the club's 2022 AFC Champions League squad. On 11 April, he scored the Islanders' first ever goal in the competition through the penalty spot, in a historic 2–1 win against Al-Quwa Al-Jawiya, as Mumbai City became the first Indian club to win an AFC Champions League game.

=== Odisha ===
In July 2022, Maurício returned to Odisha for a second spell, joining the club after a season away. His return quickly proved to be one of the most significant signings in the club's history. On 17 August, in his first competitive appearance after returning, he scored from a free-kick in a 6–0 victory over NorthEast United FC in the Durand Cup.

Maurício enjoyed a prolific 2022–23 Indian Super League campaign, scoring 12 goals in 21 appearances and helping Odisha qualify for the ISL playoffs for the first time in the club's history. He finished level on goals with Dimitrios Petratos of ATK Mohun Bagan and Cleiton Silva of East Bengal FC, but won the Indian Super League Golden Boot on the basis of his superior minutes-per-goal ratio. He became the first Odisha FC player to win the award.

His finest achievement of the season came in the 2023 Indian Super Cup, where he played a decisive role in Odisha's first major trophy. Maurício scored in the semi-final against NorthEast United FC as Odisha reached their first-ever Super Cup final. In the final against Bengaluru FC, he scored twice, including the opening goal from a free-kick and Odisha's second goal, as the club secured a 2–1 victory and its first major trophy. He finished the tournament with five goals and two assists in five matches and was named the Hero of the Tournament.

The 2023–24 season saw Maurício continue as one of Odisha's principal attacking players as the club competed domestically and in continental football following its Super Cup triumph. He also formed part of a prominent attacking partnership with Roy Krishna, who joined Odisha in July 2023. Maurício remained influential in the club's run to the 2024 Super Cup final and in its first appearance in the AFC Cup group stage.

In the 2024–25 ISL season, Maurício continued to be a key attacking outlet for Odisha. He scored in the club's opening victory of the league campaign, a 2–1 win over Jamshedpur FC, and finished the season with nine goals and six assists across competitions. His performances across his second spell established him as the club's all-time leading goalscorer.

In May 2025, after three seasons in his second spell with the club, Maurício announced his departure from Odisha FC. Across his time with Odisha, he made 111 appearances, scoring 60 goals and providing 19 assists. His honours with the club included the Indian Super League Golden Boot in 2022–23 and the Super Cup title in 2023, in which he was named Hero of the Tournament.

Maurício departed as a club legend and Odisha FC's all-time leading goalscorer, having become one of the most recognisable players in the club's history. His combination of goalscoring, dribbling and decisive performances in major matches made him a central figure in the club's most successful period to that point, while his two goals in the 2023 Super Cup final and his Golden Boot-winning 2022–23 league campaign cemented his place among Odisha's most important players.

== Career statistics ==
=== Club ===
As of match played 10 January 2026

Club	Season	League			National cup (Note: Includes Copa do Brasil, Russian Cup, Korean FA Cup, Super Cup)		Continental		Other		Total	
Club	Season	Division	Apps	Goals	Apps	Goals	Apps	Goals	Apps	Goals	Apps	Goals
Flamengo	2010	Série A	29	5	–		–		–		29	5
Flamengo	2011	Série A	21	1	4	1	2 (Note: Appearance(s) in Copa Sudamericana)	0	9 (Note: Appearance(s) in Campeonato Carioca)	1	36	3
Flamengo	2012	Série A	5	0	–		–		8	0	13	0
Flamengo	Total		55	6	4	1	2	0	17	1	78	8
Alania Vladikavkaz	2012–13	Russian Premier League	12	0	1	0	–		–		13	0
Sport Recife (loan)	2013	Série B	5	0	–		1	0	–		6	0
Vitória	2014–15	Primeira Liga	4	0	0	0	–		1 (Note: Appearance(s) in Taça da Liga)	0	5	0
Bragantino	2015	Série B	13	2	2	0	–		13 (Note: Appearance(s) in Campeonato Paulista)	4	28	6
Al Qadsiah (loan)	2015–16	Saudi First Division	5	0	–		–		–		5	0
Shijiazhuang Ever Bright (loan)	2016	Chinese Super League	25	4	–		–		–		25	4
Gangwon (loan)	2017	K League 1	36	13	1	0	–		–		37	13
Gangwon (loan)	2018	K League 1	35	7	–		–		–		35	7
Gangwon (loan)	Total		71	20	1	0	0	0	0	0	72	20
Busan IPark	2019	K League 2	21	6	0	0	–		2 (Note: Appearance(s) Promotion-relegation playoffs)	0	23	6
CSA	2020	Série B	1	0	1	0	–		9 (Note: Four appearances in Campeonato Alagoano, five appearances in Copa do Nordeste)	0	11	0
Odisha	2020–21	Indian Super League	20	12	0	0	–		–		20	12
Mumbai City	2021–22	Indian Super League	7	3	0	0	4 (Note: Appearance(s) in AFC Champions League)	2	–		11	5
Odisha	2022–23	Indian Super League	21	12	5	5	–		6 (Note: Five appearances and two goals in Durand Cup, one appearance and three goals in playoff for the AFC Cup group stage)	5	32	22
Odisha	2023–24	Indian Super League	23	11	5	3	8 (Note: Appearance(s) in AFC Cup)	3	–		36	17
Odisha	2024–25	Indian Super League	22	9	1	0	–		–		23	9
Odisha	Total		66	32	11	8	8	3	6	5	91	48
Persebaya Surabaya	2025–26	Super League (Indonesia)	7	0	0	0	–		0	0	7	0
Career total			312	85	20	9	15	5	48	10	395	109

== Honours ==
Flamengo

- Campeonato Carioca: 2011

Odisha

- Super Cup: 2023

Brazil U-20

- South American Youth Championship: 2011

Individual

- Indian Super League Golden Boot: 2022–23
- Super Cup Hero of the Tournament: 2023
