= Josep Gombau =

Spanish football manager

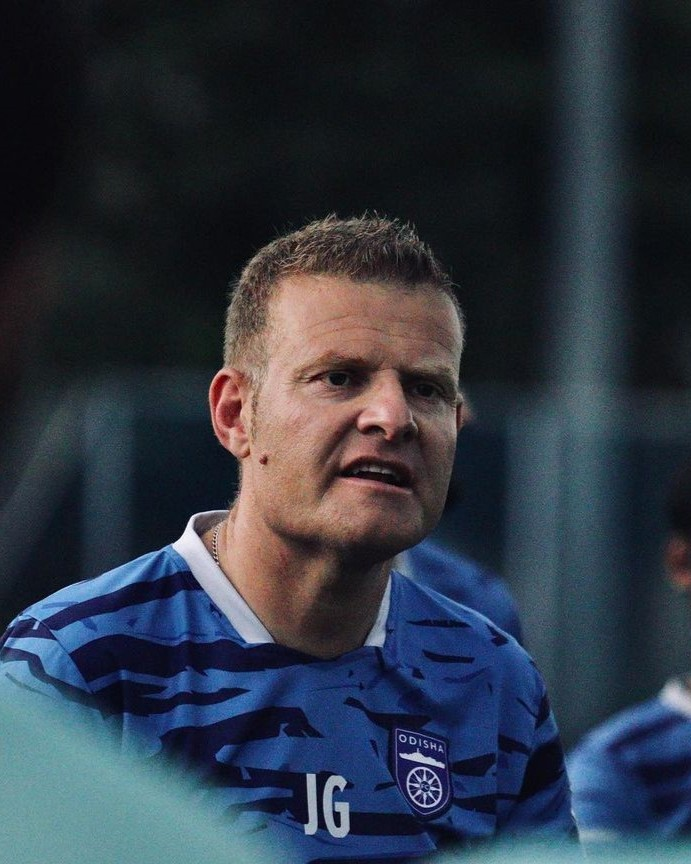
- Gombau with Odisha FC in 2023

Personal information
- Full name: Josep Gombau Balague
- Date of birth: 5 June 1976 (age 50)
- Place of birth: Amposta, Spain
- Height: 1.85 m (6 ft 1 in)
- Position: Goalkeeper

Youth career
- Years: Team
- 1982–1992: Amposta

Managerial career
- 1993–1999: Amposta
- 2009–2013: Kitchee
- 2013–2015: Adelaide United
- 2016–2017: Australia U23
- 2017–2018: Western Sydney Wanderers
- 2018–2020: Delhi Dynamos
- 2020–2022: Queensboro
- 2022–2023: Odisha
- 2023–2024: Persebaya Surabaya

Josep Gombau Balague (born 5 June 1976) is a Spanish professional football manager.

He is a former Barcelona youth team coach and has held multiple positions at the club's youth academy.

== Career ==
Born in Amposta, Tarragona, Catalonia, Gombau was a goalkeeper, but switched to coaching at the age of 16. After coaching youth teams in Amposta and Espanyol, he was signed by Barcelona in 2003 as a youth academy coach. In 2008, he became the technical director of FCB Escola, a Barcelona youth football academy opened at the Raffles International School in Jumeirah, Dubai.

=== Kitchee ===
Gombau moved to Hong Kong to join Kitchee as the club's head coach in 2009. Under Gombau, Kitchee won two league titles, two FA Cups, and one League Cup. Before the 2012 AFC Cup away match to Tampines Rovers, Kitchee captain Chu Siu Kei applauded the contribution of Gombau to the team, saying: "The coach understands that the players might be smaller than those in the other teams, but using the ball more on the ground gives us an advantage over our opponents. We have more control of the game now".

=== Adelaide United ===
On 30 April 2013, it was announced that Gombau would leave Kitchee to coach Adelaide United in the A-League. He signed a two-season deal, arriving at the club in July 2013. His first two signings were compatriots and Barcelona youth products Sergio Cirio and Isaías Sánchez. Gombau also brought his long-time assistant coach Pau Marti to work alongside existing assistant coach Michael Valkanis. Gombau stated that he wants to implement a possession-based football style at Adelaide. Gombau actively exercised his ambition to develop South Australian grassroots football by hosting free seminars for local coaches. Gombau's United won the inaugural FFA Cup by defeating Perth Glory 1–0. Gombau left the club in July 2015 to take up a youth coaching role in the United States.

=== Australia U-23 ===
Known as a developer of talent, on 28 June 2016, Gombau was appointed as head coach of Australia U-23 in place of Aurelio Vidmar, under whom the team failed to qualify for the Olympics.

=== Western Sydney Wanderers ===
On 1 November 2017, Gombau was assigned as head coach of Western Sydney Wanderers following the departure of Tony Popovic at the beginning of the season and Hayden Foxe acting as interim coach in the first four rounds. After just six months in charge, 19 April 2018, the club announced they had terminated Gombau's contract after failing to qualify for the 2017/18 A-League Finals Series.

=== Delhi Dynamos / Odisha ===
On 2 August 2018, Gombau was appointed as head coach of the Indian Super League club Delhi Dynamos following the departure of Miguel Ángel Portugal. Under Gombau, the team did not qualify for the playoffs and placed eighth on the points table, but the team's performance improved. Ahead of the 2019–20 Indian Super League, the club changed its base from Delhi to Odisha and rebranded as Odisha FC. He extended his contract with the club and they finished sixth in the 2019–20 season table, closely missing the playoffs spot. On 18 March 2020, Gombau and the club amicably parted ways for personal reasons.

On 6 May 2021, he was announced as a member of the club's technical committee along with David Villa and Victor Oñate.

=== Queensboro ===
In July 2020, Gombau was announced as the first-ever head coach and sporting director for David Villa's planned USL Championship club Queensboro. After the club's scheduled start date was pushed back twice, and with its future in doubt, he left his positions in June 2022. The organization folded shortly thereafter.

=== Return to Odisha ===
On 8 June 2022, Gombau rejoined Odisha as the head coach on a two-year deal.

=== Persebaya Surabaya ===
On 14 September 2023, Gombau was appointed as Persebaya Surabaya new head coach. However, he was later sacked a month later on 28 October 2023, after only managed for six matches, with only one win.

=== Aston Villa U21 ===
On 11 January 2024, Gombau was appointed Head Coach of Aston Villa Under-21s. On 15 May 2024, Gombau lead Aston Villa U21 to their first Birmingham Senior Cup win since 1985. On 12 June 2025, Aston Villa announced that Gombau would depart the club after being replaced in his role by Jimmy Shan.

== Personal life ==
Gombau and his wife Romina have two daughters, Bruna and Maria.

== Managerial statistics ==
As of 28 October 2023

Managerial record by team and tenure
Team	Nat.	From	To	Record								Ref.
Team	Nat.	From	To	G	W	D	L	GF	GA	GD	Win %	Ref.
Kitchee	(Hong Kong)	1 August 2009	30 April 2013	93	57	18	18	212	106	+106	61.29	
Adelaide United	(Australia)	1 July 2013	23 July 2015	62	30	12	20	105	61	+44	48.39	
Western Sydney Wanderers	(Australia)	1 November 2017	19 April 2018	22	7	5	10	30	34	−4	31.82	
Odisha	(India)	2 August 2018	18 March 2020	37	11	10	16	54	62	−8	29.73	
Odisha	(India)	8 June 2022	11 March 2023	26	13	3	10	43	35	+8	50.00	
Persebaya Surabaya	(Indonesia)	14 September 2023	28 October 2023	6	1	1	4	7	15	−8	16.67	
Career Total				246	119	49	78	451	313	+138	48.37	

== Honours ==
Kitchee

- Hong Kong First Division League: 2010–11, 2011–12
- Hong Kong FA Cup: 2011–12, 2012–13
- Hong Kong League Cup: 2011–12

Adelaide United

- FFA Cup: 2014

Aston Villa U21

- Birmingham Senior Cup: 2023–24

Individual

- Hong Kong First Division League Best coach: 2010–11, 2011–12
