= 2023 AIFF Super Cup =

2023 Super Cup
Hero Super Cup
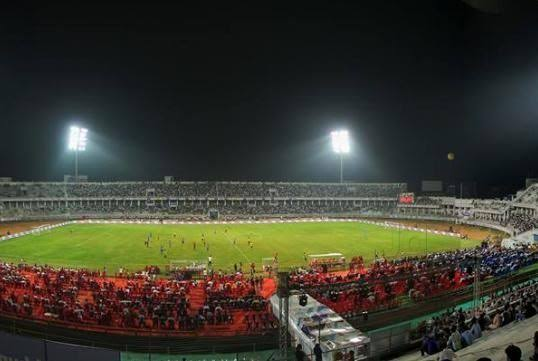
- EMS Stadium hosted the final on 25 April

Tournament details
- Country: India
- Venue(s): EMS Stadium, Kozhikode; Payyanad Stadium, Manjeri
- Dates: 3–6 April (qualification rounds); 8–25 April (main competition)
- Teams: 21 (all); 16 (group stage)

Final positions
- Champions: Odisha (1st title)
- Runners-up: Bengaluru
- AFC Cup: Odisha

Tournament statistics
- Matches played: 32
- Goals scored: 113 (3.53 per match)
- Attendance: 109,607 (3,425 per match)
- Top goal scorer: Wilmar Jordán (7 goals)

Awards
- Best player: Diego Mauricio

The 2023 AIFF Super Cup, officially known as the 2023 Hero Super Cup for sponsorship reasons, was the third edition of the Super Cup and the 41st season of the national knockout football competition in India. The competition was sponsored by Hero MotoCorp.

The tournament was being organised after a gap of four years due to various scheduling issues, with the latest edition being played in 2019. This was the first time the Super Cup champions had a spot allotted in the AFC competitions. Odisha were crowned champions after defeating Bengaluru 2–1 in the final, their first-ever major title, and qualified for the qualifier for 2023–24 AFC Cup group stage.

== Format ==
The 2023 edition of Super Cup was played across two cities of Kerala, Kozhikode and Manjeri, selected by the AIFF in a comprehensive and inclusive manner. The competition consisted of the qualifying play-offs, the group stage, the semi-finals and the final.

The tournament proper featured 16 top clubs across the top two divisions of Indian football. All 11 clubs from the ISL and the 2022–23 I-League champions directly qualified to the group stage. The teams placed 2nd to 10th in the 2022–23 I-League competed for the four remaining spots in the qualifying round that featured single-leg ties.

The 16 qualified clubs were drawn into four groups of four each, competing in a single round-robin format, with group winners making it through to the semi-finals.

== Teams ==
Group stage direct entrants
| Team | League | App (last) |
|---|---|---|
| ATK Mohun Bagan | Indian Super League | 2nd (Note: previously played in 2018 as Mohun Bagan) (2018) |
| Bengaluru | Indian Super League | 3rd (2019) |
| Chennaiyin | Indian Super League | 3rd (2019) |
| East Bengal | Indian Super League | 2nd (2018) |
| Goa | Indian Super League | 3rd (2019) |
| Hyderabad | Indian Super League | 1st |
| Jamshedpur | Indian Super League | 3rd (2019) |
| Kerala Blasters | Indian Super League | 3rd (2019) |
| Mumbai | Indian Super League | 3rd (2019) |
| NorthEast United | Indian Super League | 3rd (2019) |
| Odisha | Indian Super League | 1st |
| Roundglass Punjab | I-League | 1st |

Qualification entrants: Entering in second qualifying round
| Team | League | App (last) |
|---|---|---|
| Aizawl | I-League | 2nd (2018) |
| Churchill Brothers | I-League | 2nd (2018) |
| Gokulam Kerala | I-League | 2nd (2018) |
| Mohammedan | I-League | 1st |
| Real Kashmir | I-League | 2nd (2019) |
| Sreenidi Deccan | I-League | 1st |
| TRAU | I-League | 1st |

Qualification entrants: Entering in first qualifying round
| Team | League | App (last) |
|---|---|---|
| NEROCA | I-League | 2nd (2018) |
| Rajasthan United | I-League | 1st |

Locations of the Indian Super Cup Group Stage teams

== Schedule ==
| Phase | Round | Match dates |
|---|---|---|
| Qualification round | First qualifying round | 3 April 2023 |
| Qualification round | Second qualifying round | 5–6 April 2023 |
| Main tournament | Group stage | 8–19 April 2023 |
| Main tournament | Semi-finals | 21–22 April 2023 |
| Main tournament | Final | 25 April 2023 |

== Venues ==
A total of 32 matches were played across 2 cities, Kozhikode and Manjeri. 18 matches were played in Manjeri, including the qualifying play-offs, and 14 matches in Kozhikode.

| Kozhikode | Manjeri |
|---|---|
| EMS Corporation Stadium | Payyanad Stadium |
| Capacity: 50,000 | Capacity: 30,000 |

== Qualifying rounds ==
First qualifying round
| Team 1 | Score | Team 2 |
|---|---|---|
| Rajasthan United | 2–2 (1–3 p) | NEROCA |

Second qualifying round
| Team 1 | Score | Team 2 |
|---|---|---|
| Sreenidi Deccan | 4–2 | NEROCA |
| Gokulam Kerala | 5–2 | Mohammedan |
| TRAU | 0–1 | Aizawl |
| Real Kashmir | 0–6 | Churchill Brothers |

=== First qualifying round ===
| 3 April 2023 | Rajasthan United | 2–2 (a.e.t.) (1–3 p) | NEROCA | Manjeri |
| 20:30 IST | Kharpan 65'; Lalremsanga 98' | Report | L. Haokip 45+1'; S. Fernandes 120+3' | Stadium: Payyanad Stadium; Attendance: 1,210; Referee: Pratik Mondal; Man of the Match: Soram Poirei (NEROCA) |
| | Penalties |
| | R. Gupta (penalty missed); Neihsial (penalty scored); Amritpal (penalty missed); Horam (penalty missed) | | S. Fernandes (penalty scored); P. Singson (penalty scored); L. Rakesh Meitei (penalty missed); J. Singh (penalty scored) |

=== Second qualifying round ===
| 5 April 2023 Q-1 | Sreenidi Deccan | 4–2 | NEROCA | Manjeri |
| 17:00 IST | Shayesteh 37'; Castañeda 55' (pen.); Hassan 90', 90+4' | Report | T. Ragui 67'; B. Lupheng 80' | Stadium: Payyanad Stadium; Attendance: 483; Referee: I Jamal Mohamed; Man of the Match: Rilwan Hassan (Sreenidi Deccan) |

| 5 April 2023 Q-2 | Gokulam Kerala | 5–2 | Mohammedan | Manjeri |
| 20:30 IST | Ramos 11'; Sourav 47'; Noor 64'; Zaman 78'; Hakku 85' | Report | Dauda 27', 48' | Stadium: Payyanad Stadium; Attendance: 3,128; Referee: Senthil Nathan S Man of the Match: Omar Ramos (Gokulam Kerala) |

| 6 April 2023 Q-3 | TRAU | 0–1 | Aizawl | Manjeri |
| 17:00 IST | | Report | Veras 64' | Stadium: Payyanad Stadium; Attendance: 772; Referee: Aditya Purkayastha; Man of the Match: Ivan Veras (Aizawl) |

| 6 April 2023 Q-4 | Real Kashmir | 0–6 | Churchill Brothers | Manjeri |
| 20:30 IST | | Report | Cháves 6' (pen.); Kromah 36' (pen.), 45+1', 59', 61'; Jakhonov 75' | Stadium: Payyanad Stadium; Attendance: 1,708; Referee: Pranjal Banerjee; Man of the Match: Ansumana Kromah (Churchill Brothers) |

== Group stage ==
=== Group A ===
| Pos | Team | Pld | W | D | L | GF | GA | GD | Pts | | BEN | SRD | KER | RGP |
|---|---|---|---|---|---|---|---|---|---|---|---|---|---|---|
| 1 | Bengaluru | 3 | 1 | 2 | 0 | 4 | 2 | +2 | 5 | Advance to knockout stage | — | 1–1 | 1–1 | — |
| 2 | Sreenidi Deccan | 3 | 1 | 1 | 1 | 3 | 2 | +1 | 4 (Note: Head-to-head points: Sreenidi Deccan 3, Kerala Blasters 0.) | | — | — | 2–0 | — |
| 3 | Kerala Blasters | 3 | 1 | 1 | 1 | 4 | 4 | 0 | 4 | | — | — | — | 3–1 |
| 4 | Punjab | 3 | 1 | 0 | 2 | 2 | 5 | −3 | 3 | | 0–2 | 1–0 | — | — |

Source: AIFF
Rules for classification: 1) points; 2) head-to-head points; 3) head-to-head goal difference; 4) goal difference; 5) number of goals scored; 6) drawing of lots

=== Group B ===
| Pos | Team | Pld | W | D | L | GF | GA | GD | Pts | Qualification | OFC | HYD | EAB | AIZ |
|---|---|---|---|---|---|---|---|---|---|---|---|---|---|---|
| 1 | Odisha | 3 | 2 | 1 | 0 | 6 | 2 | +4 | 7 | Advance to knockout stage | — | — | 1–1 | — |
| 2 | Hyderabad | 3 | 1 | 1 | 1 | 6 | 6 | 0 | 4 | | 1–2 | — | — | 2–1 |
| 3 | East Bengal | 3 | 0 | 3 | 0 | 6 | 6 | 0 | 3 | | — | 3–3 | — | 2–2 |
| 4 | Aizawl | 3 | 0 | 1 | 2 | 3 | 7 | −4 | 1 | | 0–3 | — | — | — |

Source: AIFF
Rules for classification: 1) points; 2) head-to-head points; 3) head-to-head goal difference; 4) goal difference; 5) number of goals scored; 6) drawing of lots

=== Group C ===
| Pos | Team | Pld | W | D | L | GF | GA | GD | Pts | Qualification | JAM | FCG | AMB | GOK |
|---|---|---|---|---|---|---|---|---|---|---|---|---|---|---|
| 1 | Jamshedpur | 3 | 3 | 0 | 0 | 11 | 5 | +6 | 9 | Advance to knockout stage | — | — | 3–0 | 3–2 |
| 2 | Goa | 3 | 2 | 0 | 1 | 5 | 5 | 0 | 6 | | 3–5 | — | — | — |
| 3 | ATK Mohun Bagan | 3 | 1 | 0 | 2 | 5 | 5 | 0 | 3 | | — | 0–1 | — | 5–1 |
| 4 | Gokulam Kerala (H) | 3 | 0 | 0 | 3 | 3 | 9 | −6 | 0 | | — | 1–0 | — | — |

Source: AIFF
Rules for classification: 1) points; 2) head-to-head points; 3) head-to-head goal difference; 4) goal difference; 5) number of goals scored; 6) drawing of lots
(H) Hosts

=== Group D ===
| Pos | Team | Pld | W | D | L | GF | GA | GD | Pts | Qualification | NEU | MCI | CHE | CHB |
|---|---|---|---|---|---|---|---|---|---|---|---|---|---|---|
| 1 | NorthEast United | 3 | 2 | 0 | 1 | 10 | 8 | +2 | 6 (Note: Head-to-head points: NorthEast United 3, Mumbai City 0.) | Advance to knockout stage | — | 2–1 | — | 6–3 |
| 2 | Mumbai City | 3 | 2 | 0 | 1 | 4 | 3 | +1 | 6 | | — | — | 1–0 | 2–1 |
| 3 | Chennaiyin | 3 | 1 | 1 | 1 | 4 | 3 | +1 | 4 | | 4–2 | — | — | — |
| 4 | Churchill Brothers | 3 | 0 | 1 | 2 | 4 | 8 | −4 | 1 | | — | — | 0–0 | — |

Source: AIFF
Rules for classification: 1) points; 2) head-to-head points; 3) head-to-head goal difference; 4) goal difference; 5) number of goals scored; 6) drawing of lots

== Knockout stage ==
Semifinals
A1 | Bengaluru | 2
C1 | Jamshedpur | 0
B1 | Odisha | 3
D1 | NorthEast United | 1

Final
A1 | Bengaluru | 1
B1 | Odisha | 2

=== Semi-finals ===
21 April 2023
19:00 IST
SF1

| Bengaluru | 2–0 | Jamshedpur |
|---|---|---|
| Rane 67'; Chhetri 84' | Report |

EMS Stadium, Kozhikode
Attendance: 3,458
Referee: Venkatesh R

22 April 2023
19:00 IST
SF2

| Odisha | 3–1 | NorthEast United |
|---|---|---|
| Sekar 10', 63'; Maurício 86' | Report | Jordán 2' |

Payyanad Stadium, Manjeri
Attendance: 6,234
Referee: Senthil Nathan Sekaran

=== Final ===
25 April 2023
19:00 IST

| Bengaluru | 1–2 | Odisha |
|---|---|---|
| Chhetri 85' (pen.) | Report | Maurício 23', 38' |

EMS Stadium, Kozhikode
Attendance: 6,952
Referee: Rahul Kumar Gupta

== Top scorers ==
As of 25 April 2023

| Rank | Player | Club | Goals |
|---|---|---|---|
| 1 | (Colombia) Wilmar Jordán | NorthEast United | 7 |
| 2 | (Liberia) Ansumana Kromah | Churchill Brothers | 5 |
| 2 | (Brazil) Diego Maurício | Odisha | 5 |
| 4 | (India) Nandhakumar Sekar | Odisha | 4 |
| 5 | (Australia) Harry Sawyer | Jamshedpur | 3 |
| 5 | (India) Naorem Mahesh Singh | East Bengal | 3 |
| 5 | (Nigeria) Rilwan Hassan | Sreenidi Deccan | 3 |

== Awards ==
| Award | Winner |
|---|---|
| Hero of the Tournament Award for Best Player | (Brazil) Diego Maurício (Odisha) |
| Golden Boot | (Colombia) Wilmar Jordán (NorthEast United) |
| Best Goalkeeper | (India) Amrinder Singh (Odisha) |
| Fair Play Award | Aizawl FC |
Source: The-AIFF

== Broadcasting ==
The Hero Super Cup 2023 was streamed live on Fancode app (all matches) and Sony Sports Ten 2 channel (all matches except the qualifiers).

== See also ==
- Indian club qualifiers for 2023–24 AFC competitions
- 2022–23 Indian Super League
- 2022–23 I-League
- 2022–23 I-League 2
