= 2019–20 Odisha FC season =

2019–20 season of Odisha FC

Odisha
2019–2020 season
- President: Rohan Sharma
- Manager: Josep Gombau
- Stadium: Kalinga Stadium
- Indian Super League: 6th
- Top goalscorer: League: Aridane Santana (9 goals); All: Aridane Santana (9 goals)
- Highest home attendance: 9,452 (vs. Jamshedpur, 27 December)
- Lowest home attendance: 6,234 (vs. Kerala Blasters, 23 February)
- Average home league attendance: 7,294

The 2019–20 Odisha FC season was the club's inaugural season since its establishment in August 2019. On 31 August 2019, Delhi Soccer Private Limited signed a Memorandum of Understanding (MoU) with the Government of Odisha, to re-brand Delhi Dynamos FC as Odisha FC and shift the home base from the national capital New Delhi to Bhubaneswar, Odisha. The new home for the team was decided to be the Kalinga Stadium at Bhubaneswar.

== Players ==
As of 14 March 2020

No.	Name	Nationality	Position	Date of Birth (Age)
Goalkeepers
13	Francisco Dorronsoro	(Spain)	GK	22 May 1985 (age 40)
30	Ankit Bhuyan	(India)	GK	13 July 2001 (age 24)
31	Arshdeep Singh	(India)	GK	6 October 1997 (age 27)
Defenders
3	Mohammad Sajid Dhot	(India)	DF	14 December 1994 (age 30)
4	Gaurav Bora	(India)	DF	13 July 1998 (age 27)
5	Diawandou Diagne	(Senegal)	DF	8 November 1994 (age 30)
15	Shubham Sarangi	(India)	DF	24 June 2000 (age 25)
21	Narayan Das	(India)	DF	25 September 1993 (age 31)
23	Carlos Delgado	(Spain)	DF	22 April 1990 (age 35)
26	Rana Gharami	(India)	DF	6 October 1990 (age 34)
27	Lalchhuanmawia	(India)	DF	14 April 1989 (age 36)
33	Amit Tudu	(India)	DF	17 January 1998 (age 27)
Midfielders
6	Bikramjit Singh	(India)	MF	15 October 1992 (age 32)
8	Marcos Tébar (Captain)	(Spain)	MF	7 February 1986 (age 39)
10	Xisco Hernández	(Spain)	MF	31 July 1989 (age 36)
11	Martín Pérez Guedes	(Argentina)	MF	18 August 1991 (age 33)
16	Vinit Rai	(India)	MF	10 October 1997 (age 27)
17	Jerry Mawihmingthanga	(India)	MF	9 March 1997 (age 28)
19	Romeo Fernandes	(India)	MF	6 July 1992 (age 33)
22	Nanda Kumar	(India)	MF	20 December 1995 (age 29)
44	Lalhrezuala Sailung	(India)	MF	17 March 2001 (age 24)
45	Van Lal Remtluanga Chhangte	(India)	MF	12 March 2001 (age 24)
Forwards
9	Aridane Santana	(Spain)	FW	31 March 1987 (age 38)
14	Daniel Lalhlimpuia	(India)	FW	12 September 1997 (age 27)
24	Manuel Onwu	(Spain)	FW	11 January 1988 (age 37)
41	Seiminmang Manchong	(India)	FW	10 January 2000 (age 25)

== Competitions ==
=== Indian Super League ===
==== League table ====
Pos	Team	Pld	W	D	L	GF	GA	GD	Pts	Qualification
4	Chennaiyin	18	8	5	5	32	26	+6	29	Advance to ISL playoffs
5	Mumbai City	18	7	5	6	25	29	−4	26	
6	Odisha	18	7	4	7	28	31	−3	25	
7	Kerala Blasters	18	4	7	7	29	32	−3	19	
8	Jamshedpur	18	4	6	8	22	35	−13	18	

Source: Indian Super League
Rules for classification: 1) points; 2) head-to-head points; 3) head-to-head goal difference; 4) head-to-head goals scored; 5) goal difference; 5) number of goals scored; 6) fair play ranking; 6) drawing of lots

==== Results (Matchday) ====
Matchday	1	2	3	4	5	6	7	8	9	10	11	12	13	14	15	16	17	18
Ground	A	A	A	A	H	A	H	H	A	H	H	H	A	A	H	A	H	H
Result	L	L	W	D	D	D	L	W	L	W	W	W	W	L	L	L	W	D

Updated to match(es) played on 23 February 2020. Source: ISL
A = Away; H = Home; W = Win; D = Draw; L = Loss

==== Fixtures ====
League stage

22 October 2019 1	Jamshedpur	2–1	Odisha	Jamshedpur
19:30 IST (UTC+05:30)	Gharami 17' (o.g.); Monroy (yellow card) 28'; Jairu (red card) 35'; Jadhav (yellow card) 51'; Pereira (yellow card) 60'; Castel 85'	Report	Santana 40'	Stadium: JRD Tata Sports Complex; Attendance: 21,689; Referee: Arumughan; Man of the Match: Choudhary (Jamshedpur)

26 October 2019 2	NorthEast United	2–1	Odisha	Guwahati
19:30 IST (UTC+05:30)	Tlang 2' (yellow card) 89'; Triadis (yellow card) 38'; Chowdhury (yellow card) 45+1'; Gyan (yellow card) 45+2' (goal) 84'; Vaz (yellow card) 71'	Report	Sarangi (yellow card) 21'; Hernández 71'; Delgado (red card) 73'; Kumar (yellow card) 90'	Stadium: Indira Gandhi Athletic Stadium; Attendance: 14,672; Referee: Ranjit Baksi; Man of the Match: Gyan (NorthEast)

31 October 2019 3	Mumbai City	2–4	Odisha	Mumbai
19:30 IST (UTC+05:30)	Singh (yellow card) 35'; Larbi 51' (pen.); Fernandes (yellow card) 58'; Singh 90+5'	Report	Hernández 6'; Rai (yellow card) 11'; Santana 21', 73' (yellow card) 37'; Mawihmingthanga 41'	Stadium: Mumbai Football Arena; Attendance: 5,517; Referee: Arumughan; Man of the Match: Mawihmingthanga (Odisha)

8 November 2019 4	Kerala Blasters	0–0	Odisha	Kochi
19:30 IST (UTC+05:30)		Report		Stadium: Jawaharlal Nehru Stadium; Attendance: 20,107; Referee: C. R. Srikrishna; Man of the Match: Cido (Kerala)

24 November 2019 5	Odisha	0–0	ATK	Pune
19:30 IST (UTC+05:30)	Diagne (yellow card) 90+1'	Report	Edathodika (yellow card) 15'; Agus (yellow card) 90+1'	Stadium: Shree Shiv Chhatrapati Sports Complex; Referee: Crystal John; Man of the Match: Santana (Odisha)

28 November 2019 6	Chennaiyin	2–2	Odisha	Chennai
19:30 IST (UTC+05:30)	Singh (yellow card) 49'; Valskis 51', 71'	Report	Rai (yellow card) 22'; Hernández 54'; Delgado (yellow card) 66'; Santana 82'	Stadium: Jawaharlal Nehru Stadium; Attendance: 8,693; Referee: Umesh Bora; Man of the Match: Valskis (Chennaiyin)

4 December 2019 7	Odisha	0–1	Bengaluru	Pune
19:30 IST (UTC+05:30)		Report	Juanan 36'; Kuruniyan (yellow card) 44'	Stadium: Shree Shiv Chhatrapati Sports Complex; Attendance: 3,816; Referee: Crystal John; Man of the Match: Sandhu (Bengaluru)

11 December 2019 8	Odisha	3–2	Hyderabad	Pune
19:30 IST (UTC+05:30)	Rai (yellow card) 11' (yellow-red card) 64'; Delgado 27'; Hernández 41'; Sarangi (yellow card) 55'; Guedes 71' (pen.); Tébar (yellow card) 90+2'	Report	Bobô 65' (pen.); Kumar 89'	Stadium: Shree Shiv Chhatrapati Sports Complex; Referee: Turki Alkhudhayr; Man of the Match: Mawihmingthanga (Odisha)

22 December 2019 9	Goa	3–0	Odisha	Margao
19:30 IST (UTC+05:30)	Coro 19', 89' (pen.); Bedia (yellow card) 73'; Fernandes 85' (yellow card) 90+1'	Report	Delgado (yellow card) 43'; Bora (yellow card) 67'; Das (yellow card) 80'	Stadium: Fatorda Stadium; Attendance: 12,244; Referee: L Ajitkumar Meitei; Man of the Match: Coro (Goa)

27 December 2019 10	Odisha	2–1	Jamshedpur	Bhubaneswar
19:30 IST (UTC+05:30)	Bora (yellow card) 19'; Santana 28', 45' (yellow card) 79'; Das (yellow card) 30'; Delgado (yellow card) 33'; Sarangi (yellow card) 62'; Dorronsoro (yellow card) 90+6'	Report	Monroy 38' (pen.); Choudhary (yellow card) 85'; Passi (yellow card) 90+5'	Stadium: Kalinga Stadium; Attendance: 9,452; Referee: Ranjit Baksi; Man of the Match: Santana (Odisha)

6 January 2020 11	Odisha	2–0	Chennaiyin	Bhubaneswar
19:30 IST (UTC+05:30)	Mawihmingthanga 37'; Vinit 41'; Guedes (yellow card) 90'	Report	Thapa (yellow card) 64'	Stadium: Kalinga Stadium; Attendance: 6,382; Referee: Raktim Saha; Man of the Match: Vinit (Odisha)

11 January 2020 12	Odisha	2–0	Mumbai City	Bhubaneswar
19:30 IST (UTC+05:30)	Santana 47' (yellow card) 90'; Dorronsoro (yellow card) 62'; Hernández 74'; Vinit (yellow card) 84'	Report	Chaudhari (yellow card) 46'; Kevyn (yellow card) 67'; Hmingthanmawia (yellow card) 69'	Stadium: Kalinga Stadium; Attendance: 7,778; Referee: C. R. Srikrishna; Man of the Match: Santana (Odisha)

15 January 2020 13	Hyderabad	1–2	Odisha	Hyderabad
19:30 IST (UTC+05:30)	Marcelinho 1'; Bhagat (yellow card) 15' (yellow-red card) 45'	Report	Santana 15', 45'; Vinit (yellow card) 42'; Hernández (yellow card) 49'; Dorronsoro (yellow card) 90'	Stadium: G. M. C. Balayogi Athletic Stadium; Referee: R Venkatesh; Man of the Match: Santana (Odisha)

22 January 2020 14	Bengaluru	3–0	Odisha	Bangalore
19:30 IST (UTC+05:30)	Brown 23'; Bheke 25'; Khabra (yellow card) 37'; Chhetri 61' (pen.) (yellow card) 82'	Report	Sarangi (yellow card) 45'; Guedes (yellow card) 60'; Delgado (yellow card) 79'	Stadium: Sree Kanteerava Stadium; Attendance: 9746; Referee: Kasimov Sherzod; Man of the Match: Paartalu (Bengaluru)

29 January 2020 15	Odisha	2–4	Goa	Bhubaneswar
19:30 IST (UTC+05:30)	Onwu 59', 65'; Dhot (yellow card) 79'; Bora (yellow card) 90'	Report	Vinit 22' (o.g.); Singh 22', 27'; Bedia (yellow card) 83'; Fernandes (yellow card) 89'; Corominas 90'	Stadium: Kalinga Stadium; Attendance: 7463; Referee: Pranjal Banerjee; Man of the Match: Singh (Goa)

8 February 2020 16	ATK	3–1	Odisha	Kolkata
19:30 IST (UTC+05:30)	Krishna 49', 60', 63'; Hernández (yellow card) 90'	Report	Hernández (yellow card) 29'; Das (yellow card) 41'; Onwu 67'; Nanda (yellow card) 80'; Mawihmingthanga (yellow card) 82'	Stadium: Salt Lake Stadium; Attendance: 15751; Referee: L Ajit Metei; Man of the Match: Krishna (Kolkata)

14 February 2020 17	Odisha	2–1	NorthEast United	Bhubaneswar
19:30 IST (UTC+05:30)	Sarangi (yellow card) 29'; Vinit (yellow card) 32'; Onwu 47' (yellow card) 84'; Guedes 72' (yellow card) 90'	Report	Tlang (yellow card) 20'; Cháves 24'; Leudo (yellow card) 35'; Pradhan 38'; Vaz (yellow card) 84'	Stadium: Kalinga Stadium; Attendance: 6456; Referee: Muhammad Taqi; Man of the Match: Hernández (Odisha)

23 February 2020 18	Odisha	4–4	Kerala Blasters	Bhubaneswar
19:30 IST (UTC+05:30)	Onwu 2', 37', 51' (yellow card) 81'; Das (yellow card) 16'; Guedes 44' (pen.) (yellow card) 53'; Bora (yellow card) 84'; Dorronsoro (yellow card) 90'; Tébar (yellow card) 90'	Report	Das 6' (o.g.); Bouli 28'; Lalruatthara (yellow card) 45'; Khan 50'; Carneiro (yellow card) 85'	Stadium: Kalinga Stadium; Attendance: 6234; Referee: Tejas Nagvenkar; Man of the Match: Onwu (Odisha)

== Personnel ==
Position	Name
Head Coach	(Spain) Josep Gombau
Assistant Coach	(India) Thangboi Singto
Assistant Coach	(Spain) Jacobo Ramallo
Team Manager	(India) Abhik Chatterjee
Goalkeeping Coach	(Spain) Pau Rovira Crua
Strengthening & Conditioning Coach	(Spain) Joan Casanova Bertomeu
Performance Analyst	(India) Abhijit Bharali
Head of Football Development	(India) Aakash Narula
Head of Youth Development	(India) Thangboi Singto
Manager – Youth Teams	(India) Sayantan Ganguly
Grassroots Manager	(India) Suvam Das

== Statistics ==
No.	Pos	Nat	Player	Total		ISL	
No.	Pos	Nat	Player	Apps	Goals	Apps	Goals
Goalkeepers
13	GK	(Spain) ESP	Francisco Dorronsoro	10	0	10+0	0
30	GK	(India) IND	Ankit Bhuyan	0	0	0+0	0
31	GK	(India) IND	Arshdeep Singh	9	0	8+1	0
Defenders
3	DF	(India) IND	Mohammad Sajid Dhot	4	0	1+3	0
4	DF	(India) IND	Gaurav Bora	10	0	8+2	0
5	DF	(Senegal) SEN	Diawandou Diagne	10	0	8+2	0
15	DF	(India) IND	Shubham Sarangi	17	0	17+0	0
21	DF	(India) IND	Narayan Das	18	0	18+0	0
23	DF	(Spain) ESP	Carlos Delgado	16	1	15+1	1
26	DF	(India) IND	Rana Gharami	4	0	4+0	0
27	DF	(India) IND	Lalchhuanmawia	3	0	0+3	0
33	DF	(India) IND	Amit Tudu	0	0	0+0	0
Midfielders
6	MF	(India) IND	Bikramjit Singh	6	0	0+6	0
8	MF	(Spain) ESP	Marcos Tébar	17	0	17+0	0
10	MF	(Spain) ESP	Xisco Hernández	18	5	15+3	5
11	MF	(Argentina) ARG	Martín Pérez Guedes	18	3	7+11	3
16	MF	(India) IND	Vinit Rai	15	1	15+0	1
17	MF	(India) IND	Jerry Mawihmingthanga	17	2	16+1	2
19	MF	(India) IND	Romeo Fernandes	3	0	0+3	0
22	MF	(India) IND	Nanda Kumar	16	0	15+1	0
44	MF	(India) IND	Lalhrezuala Sailung	0	0	0+0	0
45	MF	(India) IND	Van Lal Remtluanga Chhangte	0	0	0+0	0
Forwards
9	FW	(Spain) ESP	Aridane Santana	14	9	14+0	9
14	FW	(India) IND	Daniel Lalhlimpuia	16	0	6+10	0
24	FW	(Spain) ESP	Manuel Onwu	4	7	4+0	7
41	FW	(India) IND	Seiminmang Manchong	4	0	0+4	0

- Source: Indian Super League

Updated: 14 March 2020

=== Top scorers ===
Rank	No.	Pos	Nat	Player	ISL	Total
1	9	FW	(Spain)	Aridane Santana	9	9
2	24	FW	(Spain)	Manuel Onwu	7	7
3	10	MF	(Spain)	Xisco Hernández	5	5
4	11	DF	(Argentina)	Martín Pérez Guedes	3	3
5	17	MF	(India)	Jerry Mawihmingthanga	2	2
6	23	MF	(Spain)	Carlos Delgado	1	1
6	16	DF	(India)	Vinit Rai	1	1

Source: ISL
Updated: 14 March 2020

=== Clean sheets ===
Rank	No.	Pos	Nat	Player	ISL	Total
1	13	GK	(Spain)	Francisco Dorronsoro	3	3
2	30	GK	(India)	Arshdeep Singh	1	1
TOTALS					4	4

Source: ISL
Updated: 14 March 2020

=== Disciplinary record ===
Rank	No.	Pos	Nat	Player	ISL		Total	
Rank	No.	Pos	Nat	Player	Booked	Sent off (straight red)	Booked	Sent off (straight red)
1	16	MF	(India)	Vinit Rai	7	0	7	0
2	15	DF	(India)	Shubham Sarangi	5	0	5	0
3	23	DF	(India)	Carlos Delgado	4	1	4	1
4	4	DF	(India)	Gaurav Bora	4	0	4	0
4	11	MF	(Argentina)	Martín Pérez Guedes	4	0	4	0
4	13	GK	(Spain)	Francisco Dorronsoro	4	0	4	0
4	21	DF	(India)	Narayan Das	4	0	4	0
8	9	FW	(Spain)	Aridane Santana	3	0	3	0
9	8	MF	(Spain)	Marcos Tébar	2	0	2	0
9	10	MF	(Spain)	Xisco Hernández	2	0	2	0
9	22	MF	(India)	Nanda Kumar	2	0	2	0
9	24	FW	(Spain)	Manuel Onwu	2	0	2	0
13	3	DF	(India)	Mohammad Sajid Dhot	1	0	1	0
13	5	DF	(India)	Diawandou Diagne	1	0	1	0
13	17	MF	(India)	Jerry Mawihmingthanga	1	0	1	0
TOTALS					43	1	43	1

Source: ISL
Updated: 14 March 2020

== Awards ==
=== Hero of the Match ===
Player	Against	Date
(India) Jerry Mawihmingthanga	Mumbai City	31 October 2019
(Spain) Aridane Santana	ATK	24 November 2019
(India) Jerry Mawihmingthanga	Hyderabad	11 December 2019
(Spain) Aridane Santana	Jamshedpur	27 December 2019
(India) Vinit Rai	Chennaiyin	6 January 2020
(Spain) Aridane Santana	Mumbai City	11 January 2020
(Spain) Aridane Santana	Hyderabad	15 January 2020
(Spain) Xisco Hernández	NorthEast United	14 February 2020
(Spain) Manuel Onwu	Kerala Blasters	23 February 2020

=== ISL Emerging Player of the Match ===
Player	Against	Date
(India) Jerry Mawihmingthanga	Jamshedpur	22 October 2019
(India) Nanda Kumar Sekar	Mumbai City	31 October 2019
(India) Shubham Sarangi	ATK	24 November 2019
(India) Shubham Sarangi	Chennaiyin	28 November 2019
(India) Vinit Rai	Bengaluru	4 December 2019
(India) Shubham Sarangi	Goa	22 December 2019
(India) Shubham Sarangi	Jamshedpur	27 December 2019
(India) Jerry Mawihmingthanga	Chennaiyin	6 January 2020
(India) Jerry Mawihmingthanga	Mumbai City	11 January 2020
(India) Jerry Mawihmingthanga	Hyderabad	15 January 2020
(India) Gaurav Bora	Goa	29 January 2020
(India) Jerry Mawihmingthanga	Kerala Blasters	23 February 2020
