= 2019–20 Bengaluru FC season =

7th season in existence of Bengaluru FC

Bengaluru FC
2019–20 season
- Bengaluru FC's final round-robin match against ATK.
- Chairman: (India) Parth Jindal
- Manager: (Spain) Carles Cuadrat
- Stadium: Sree Kanteerava Stadium
- Indian Super League: 3rd of 10
- Top goalscorer: League: Sunil Chhetri (9 goals); All: Sunil Chhetri (11 goals)
- Highest home attendance: 27,083 (vs Kerala Blasters)
- Lowest home attendance: 9,746 (vs Odisha FC)
- Average home league attendance: 152,346 (15,235 per game)
Home colours	Away colours	Third colours
- All statistics correct as of 29 September 2019.

The 2019–20 season was the Bengaluru FC's seventh season as club since its establishment in 2013.

== Background ==
=== Transfers ===
In May 2019, Bengaluru FC signed goal keeper Prabhsukhan Singh Gill and midfielder Suresh Singh Wangjam from Indian Arrows. Bengaluru also signed a contract extension with Kean Lewis, Dimas Delgado and Albert Serrán. Midfielder Eugeneson Lyngdoh returned to Bengaluru FC for a one-year deal. On 17 July Bengaluru FC announced signing of Spanish forward Manuel Onwu Bengaluru FC announced signing of Brazilian midfielder Raphael Augusto on two year deal. On 27 August Bengaluru FC announced signing of India international midfielder Ashique Kuruniyan on four year deal from FC Pune City for undisclosed transfer fee. In the mid season transfer window, Bengaluru FC signed Jamaican striker Deshorn Brown as seventh foreigner. Brown signed for one and half year, will keep him with the club till the end of the 2020-21 season. On 28 January Bengaluru FC announced signing of spanish winger Nili Perdomo till end of the season. He replaced striker Manuel Onwu On 12 February Bengaluru FC announced signing of Jamaican striker Kevaughn Frater in place of injured Raphael Augusto on short term deal.

On 4 June Bengaluru FC announced transfer of midfielder Boithang Haokip to East Bengal for undisclosed fee. Spanish midfielder Xisco Hernández signed for Delhi Dynamos. Venezuelan striker Miku ended his two year stint with the club. Midfielder Myron Mendes signed for Gokulam Kerala. Goalkeeper Soram Poirei signed for NorthEast United. Midfielder Bidyananda Singh signed for Mumbai City FC. Robinson Singh and Asheer Akhtar who were promoted from reserves team to the senior team, joined TRAU F.C. and East Bengal F.C. respectively. Foreign players Álex Barrera, Chencho Gyeltshen, and Luisma were also released.

In the winter transfer window, Ajay Chhetri was loaned out to Hyderabad FC till the end of the season. Edmund Lalrindika was given two years contract extension and loaned out to I-League side East Bengal F.C. till the end of the season. Striker Manuel Onwu was loaned out to Odisha FC till the end of the season.

==== In ====
No.	Position	Player	Previous club	Transfer fee	Date	Ref
31	GK	(India) Prabhsukhan Singh Gill	Indian Arrows	Free agent	13 May 2019	
27	MF	(India) Suresh Singh Wangjam	Indian Arrows	Free agent	13 May 2019	
7	MF	(India) Eugeneson Lyngdoh	ATK	Free agent	17 June 2019	
9	FW	(Spain) Manuel Onwu	(Spain) UCAM Murcia	Free agent	17 July 2019	
12	MF	(Brazil) Raphael Augusto	Chennaiyin	Free agent	24 August 2019	
19	MF	(India) Ashique Kuruniyan	Pune City	Undisclosed (Note: Fee reported as €88,000)	27 August 2019	
26	FW	(Jamaica) Deshorn Brown	(United States) Oklahoma City	Free agent	1 January 2020	
29	MF	(Spain) Nili Perdomo	(Greece) Platanias	Free agent	28 January 2020	
17	FW	(Jamaica) Kevaughn Frater	(United States) New Mexico United	Free agent	12 February 2020	

==== Out ====
No.	Position	Player	Outgoing club	Date	Fee	Ref
7	FW	(Venezuela) Miku	(Cyprus) Omonia Nicosia	1 June 2019	Free agent	
9	MF	(Spain) Luisma	(Spain) Sestao	1 June 2019	Free agent	
15	MF	(India) Bidyananda Singh	Mumbai City	1 June 2019	Free agent	
16	MF	(India) Myron Mendes	Gokulam Kerala	1 June 2019	Free agent	
19	MF	(Spain) Xisco Hernández	Delhi Dynamos	1 June 2019	Free agent	
23	GK	(India) Soram Poirei	NorthEast United	1 June 2019	Free agent	
24	MF	(Spain) Álex Barrera	(Spain) Barakaldo	1 June 2019	Free agent	
26	DF	(India) Asheer Akhtar	East Bengal	1 June 2019	Free agent	
27	FW	(Bhutan) Chencho Gyeltshen	(Bhutan) Paro	1 June 2019	Free agent	
38	MF	(India) Robinson Singh	TRAU	1 June 2019	Free agent	
17	MF	(India) Boithang Haokip	East Bengal	4 June 2019	Unknown	

==== Out on loan ====
No.	Position	Player	Outgoing club	Date	Fee	Ref
25	MF	(India) Ajay Chhetri	(India) Hyderabad	7 January 2020	Unknown	
37	FW	(India) Edmund Lalrindika	(India) East Bengal	14 January 2020	Unknown	
9	FW	(Spain) Manuel Onwu	(India) Odisha	28 January 2020	Unknown	

== Pre-season and friendlies ==
Bengaluru FC started pre-season with a friendly against I-League club Churchill Brothers on 27 September 2019 at Bellary. Bengaluru won the game 3–1 with Erik Paartalu scoring the opening goal and Ajay Chhetri scoring a brace in the second half. Playing the next friendly against Gokulam Kerala, Bengaluru were handed 1–3 defeat, with Kean Lewis scoring the solitary goal. In the final phase of pre-season, Bengaluru played two games against Minerva Punjab F.C., winning the first 1–0 with a goal from Thongkhosiem Haokip, and losing the second by the same margin.

27 September 2019 Friendly	Bengaluru	3–1	Churchill Brothers	Bellary
	Paartalu; A. Chhetri	Report	Plaza (pen.)	Stadium: Vidyangar Township Ground

1 October 2019 Friendly	Bengaluru	1–3	Gokulam Kerala	Bellary
	Lewis	Report	Kisekka; Marcus; Rahul KP	Stadium: Vidyangar Township Ground

12 October 2019 Friendly	Bengaluru	1–0	Minerva Punjab	Bellary
	Haokip	Report

13 October 2019 Friendly	Bengaluru	0–1	Minerva Punjab	Bellary
		Report	Chote

== Competitions ==
=== Overview ===
Competition	First match	Last match	Starting round	Final position	Record							
Competition	First match	Last match	Starting round	Final position	Pld	W	D	L	GF	GA	GD	Win %
Super League	21 October 2019	8 March 2020	Matchday-1	Semi-finals	20	9	6	5	24	16	+8	45.00
AFC Cup	5 February 2020	12 February 2020	Preliminary-round	Play-off	4	3	0	1	14	5	+9	75.00
Total					24	12	6	6	38	21	+17	50.00

Last updated: 31 May 2020
Source: Competitions

=== Indian Super League ===
==== League stage ====
21 October 2019 1	Bengaluru	0–0	NorthEast United	Bengaluru
19:30 IST		Report		Stadium: Sree Kanteerava Stadium; Attendance: 15,971; Referee: R. Venkathesh; Man of the Match: Raphael Augusto (Bengaluru)

28 October 2019 2	Goa	1–1	Bengaluru	Margao
19:30 IST	Coro 90+3' (pen.)	Report	Udanta 62' (yellow card) 80'; Augusto (yellow card) 89'	Stadium: Fatorda Stadium; Attendance: 17,773; Referee: Crystal John; Man of the Match: Udanta Singh (Bengaluru)

3 November 2019 3	Jamshedpur	0–0	Bengaluru	Jamshedpur
19:30 IST		Report		Stadium: JRD Tata Sports Complex; Attendance: 23,157; Referee: Crystal John; Man of the Match: Subrata Paul (Jamshedpur)

10 November 2019 4	Bengaluru	3–0	Chennaiyin	Bengaluru
19:30 IST	Paartalu 14'; Chhetri 25' (yellow card) 75'; Semboi 84'	Report	Valskis (yellow card) 45'; Dhanpal (yellow card) 61'; Kaith (yellow card) 90+1'	Stadium: Sree Kanteerava Stadium; Attendance: 16,219; Referee: L Ajitkumar Meitei; Man of the Match: Erik Paartalu (Bengaluru FC)

23 November 2019 5	Bengaluru	1–0	Kerala Blasters	Bengaluru
19:30 IST	Khabra (yellow card) 53'; Chhetri 55'	Report	Rakip (yellow card) 34'; Hakku (yellow card) 54'; Messi B. (yellow card) 66'; Sahal (yellow card) 72'	Stadium: Sree Kanteerava Stadium; Attendance: 27,083; Referee: Ranjit Bakshi; Man of the Match: Sunil Chhetri (Bengaluru FC)

29 November 2019 6	Hyderabad	1–1	Bengaluru	Hyderabad
19:30 IST	R. Singh 90+2'	Report	Chhetri 2'; Serrán (yellow card) 37'; Paartalu (yellow card) 47'; Dimas (yellow card) 59'	Stadium: G. M. C. Balayogi Athletic Stadium; Attendance: 8,172; Referee: Ajit Metei; Man of the Match: Robin Singh (Hyderabad)

4 December 2019 7	Odisha	0–1	Bengaluru	Pune
19:30 IST		Report	Juanan 36'; Ashique (yellow card) 44'	Stadium: Shree Shiv Chhatrapati Sports Complex; Attendance: 3,816; Referee: Crystal John; Man of the Match: Gurpreet Singh Sandhu (Bengaluru FC)

15 December 2019 8	Bengaluru	2–3	Mumbai City	Bengaluru
19:30 IST	Kuruniyan (yellow card) 44'; Juanan (yellow card) 45+4'; Grgić 58' (o.g.); Lyngdoh (yellow card) 87'; Chhetri 89' (pen.); Augusto (yellow card) 90+3'	Report	Bose 12'; Sougou (yellow card) 21'; Borges (yellow card) 34' (goal) 90+4'; Amrinder (yellow card) 45'; Chermiti (yellow card) 45'; Diego 77' (yellow card) 90+5'; Sarthak (yellow card) 88'; Kevyn (yellow card) 90+5'	Stadium: Sree Kanteerava Stadium; Attendance: 13,950; Referee: (Saudi Arabia) Turki Al Khudair; Man of the Match: Rowllin Borges (NorthEast United)

18 December 2019 9	NorthEast United	0–2	Bengaluru	Guwahati
19:30 IST	Redeem (yellow card) 41'	Report	Paartalu (yellow card) 42'; Chhetri 68' (pen.); Serrán 81'	Stadium: Indira Gandhi Athletic Stadium; Referee: Umesh Bora; Man of the Match: Juanan (Bengaluru FC)

25 December 2019 10	ATK	1–0	Bengaluru	Kolkata
19:30 IST	Kotal (yellow card) 25'; Williams 47'; Mandi (yellow card) 53'; Agus (yellow card) 69'	Report	Ashique (yellow card) 68'; Nishu (yellow card) 90'	Stadium: Salt Lake Stadium; Attendance: 18,326; Referee: R Venkatesh; Man of the Match: David Williams (ATK)

3 January 2020 11	Bengaluru	2–1	Goa	Bengaluru
19:30 IST	Paartalu (yellow card) 12'; Juanan (yellow card) 54'; Chhetri 59', 84'	Report	Boumous 61'	Stadium: Sree Kanteerava Stadium; Attendance: 13,509; Referee: C. R. Srikrishna; Man of the Match: Sunil Chhetri (Bengaluru FC)

9 January 2020 12	Bengaluru	2–0	Jamshedpur	Bengaluru
19:30 IST	Paartalu 8'; Khabra (yellow card) 45'; Chhetri 63'	Report	Monroy (yellow card) 27'; Narender (yellow card) 46'	Stadium: Sree Kanteerava Stadium; Attendance: 10,731; Referee: Raktim Saha; Man of the Match: Ashique Kuruniyan (Bengaluru FC)

17 January 2020 13	Mumbai City	2–0	Bengaluru	Mumbai
19:30 IST	Sougou 13'; Carlos (yellow card) 54'; Chermiti 55'	Report	Dimas (yellow card) 42'; Nishu (yellow card) 49'; Chhetri (yellow card) 79'	Stadium: Mumbai Football Arena; Attendance: 5,210; Referee: C. R. Srikrishna

22 January 2020 14	Bengaluru	3–0	Odisha	Bengaluru
19:30 IST	Brown 23'; Bheke 25'; Khabra (yellow card) 37'; Chhetri 61' (pen.) (yellow card) 82'	Report	Shubham (yellow card) 45'; Guedes (yellow card) 60'; Carlos (yellow card) 79'	Stadium: Sree Kanteerava Stadium; Attendance: 9,746; Referee: Kasimov Sherzod (Uzbekistan); Man of the Match: Erik Paartalu (Bengaluru FC)

30 January 2020 15	Bengaluru	1–0	Hyderabad	Bengaluru
19:30 IST	Kumar 7' (yellow card) 25'; Dimas (yellow card) 27'; Khabra (yellow card) 28'; Juanan (yellow card) 78'	Report	Barnes (yellow card) 45'; Adil (yellow card) 59'; Yasir (yellow card) 70'; Kilgallon (yellow card) 90+3'	Stadium: Sree Kanteerava Stadium; Attendance: 9,834; Referee: Tejas Nagvenkar; Man of the Match: Nishu Kumar (Bengaluru FC)

9 February 2020 16	Chennaiyin	0–0	Bengaluru	Chennai
19:30 IST	Thoi (yellow card) 72' (yellow-red card) 88'	Report	Juanan (yellow card) 52'; Serrán (yellow card) 68'; Nili (yellow card) 72'; Chhetri (yellow card) 90+6'	Stadium: Jawaharlal Nehru Stadium; Attendance: 10,953; Referee: Crystal John; Man of the Match: Rafael Crivellaro (Channaiyin)

15 February 2020 17	Kerala Blasters	2–1	Bengaluru	Kochi
19:30 IST	Ogbeche 45+3' (pen.), 72'	Report	Brown 16' (yellow card) 43'; Serrán (yellow card) 45+2'	Stadium: Jawaharlal Nehru Stadium; Attendance: 7,754; Referee: L Ajitkumar Meitei; Man of the Match: Bartholomew Ogbeche (Kerala Blasters)

22 February 2020 18	Bengaluru	2–2	ATK	Bengaluru
19:30 IST	Dimas 18'; Frater 35'; Gill (yellow card) 51'; Wangjam (yellow card) 82'	Report	Garcia 86'; Soosairaj 90'	Stadium: Sree Kanteerava Stadium; Attendance: 14,549; Referee: Muhammad Taqi (Singapore); Man of the Match: Edu Garcia (ATK)

==== Playoffs ====
1 March 2020 Semi-Finals	Bengaluru	1–0	ATK	Bengaluru
19:30 IST	Brown 31'; Juanan (yellow card) 36'; Frater (yellow card) 75'; Kumar (red card) 84'; Khabra (yellow card) 86'		Rathi (yellow card) 82'	Stadium: Sree Kanteerava Stadium; Attendance: 20,754; Referee: Muhammad Taqi (Qatar); Man of the Match: Erik Paartalu (Bengaluru FC)

8 March 2020 Semi-Finals	ATK	3–1 (3–2 agg.)	Bengaluru	Kolkata
19:30 IST	Krishna 30'; Williams 63' (pen.), 79'	Report	Kuruniyan 5' (yellow card) 44'; Brown (yellow card) 44'	Stadium: Salt Lake Stadium; Attendance: 50,102; Referee: Ali Abdulnabi (Bahrain); Man of the Match: Prabir Das (ATK)

==== Table ====
Pos	Team	Pld	W	D	L	GF	GA	GD	Pts	Qualification
1	Goa (L)	18	12	3	3	46	23	+23	39	Qualification for 2021 AFC Champions League group stage and ISL playoffs
2	ATK (Note: Originally, Mohun Bagan, the 2019–20 I-League champions (they were already assured of the title before the league was abandoned due to the COVID-19 pandemic in India), would qualify as India 2 (2021 AFC Cup group stage), and ATK, the 2020 Indian Super League playoffs winners, would qualify as India 3 (2021 AFC Cup qualifying play-offs). However, ATK owners KGSPL ceased their football operation and bought majority stakes in Mohun Bagan FC (India) Private Limited and rebranded Mohun Bagan football team as ATK Mohun Bagan FC from the 2020–21 Indian Super League which qualified as India 2 in 2021 AFC club competition. The All India Football Federation decided that Bengaluru FC, the 2019–20 Indian Super League regular season 3rd place (behind FC Goa, which qualified for the 2021 AFC Champions League, and ATK), will qualify as India 3.) (C)	18	10	4	4	33	16	+17	34	Advance to ISL playoffs
3	Bengaluru	18	8	6	4	22	13	+9	30	Qualification for 2021 AFC Cup play-off round and ISL playoffs
4	Chennaiyin	18	8	5	5	32	26	+6	29	Advance to ISL playoffs
5	Mumbai City	18	7	5	6	25	29	−4	26	

Source: Indian Super League
Rules for classification: 1) points; 2) head-to-head points; 3) head-to-head goal difference; 4) head-to-head goals scored; 5) goal difference; 5) number of goals scored; 6) fair play ranking; 6) drawing of lots
(C) Champions; (L) League Winners' Shield Winners

==== Results by matchday ====
Matchday	1	2	3	4	5	6	7	8	9	10	11	12	13	14	15	16	17	18
Ground	H	A	A	H	H	A	A	H	A	A	H	H	A	H	H	A	A	H
Result	D	D	D	W	W	D	W	L	W	L	W	W	L	W	W	D	L	D
Position	2	7	7	5	2	2	1	3	1	3	2	2	2	1	2	3	3	3

Source: soccerway
A = Away; H = Home; W = Win; D = Draw; L = Loss

=== AFC Cup ===
As the winner of 2018–19 Indian Super League, Bengaluru FC qualified for 2020 AFC Cup qualifiers. This will be Bengaluru's fifth appearance in the tournament after missing out in 2019.

==== Qualifying play-offs ====
Bengaluru FC faced Paro FC from Bhutan in preliminary round and won 10–1 on aggregate to advance for playoff round. In playoff round Bengaluru FC faced Maziya S&RC from Maldives, but failed to advance after losing out on penalties.

Preliminary round

5 February 2020	Paro (Bhutan)	0–1	(India) Bengaluru	Thimphu, Bhutan
14:30 UTC+6		Report	Haokip 53'	Stadium: Changlimithang Stadium; Attendance: 8,140; Referee: Ahmed Al Ali (Kuwait)

12 February 2020	Bengaluru (India)	9–1 (10–1 agg.)	(Bhutan) Paro	Bengaluru, India
19:30 UTC+5:30	Haokip 6', 26', 66', 85'; Juanan 14'; Brown 29', 54', 64'; Wangjam (yellow card) 45'; Nili (yellow card) 56' (goal) 79'	Report	Gyeltshen 16'; Zangpo (yellow card) 56'	Stadium: Sree Kanteerava Stadium; Attendance: 1,311; Referee: Khaled Al Teris (Saudi Arabia)

Playoff

19 February 2020	Maziya (Maldives)	2–1	(India) Bengaluru	Malé, Maldives
16:00 5:00	Mahudhee 64'; Stewart 80'	Report	Khabra (yellow card) 26'; Nili 71' (pen.); Kuruniyan (yellow card) 79'	Stadium: National Football Stadium; Attendance: 678; Referee: Adel Al Naqbi (United Arab Emirates)

26 February 2020	Bengaluru (India)	3–2 (a.e.t.) (4–4 agg.) (3–4 p)	(Maldives) Maziya	Bengaluru, India
19:30 UTC+5:30	Brown 58' (yellow card) 4'; Chhetri 78', 120+1' (yellow card) 117'; Nili (yellow card) 90'	Report	Waheed 73'; Planic (yellow card) 86'; Stewart 103'; Mahudhee (yellow card) 105'; Azizi (yellow card) 117'	Stadium: Sree Kanteerava Stadium; Attendance: 1,321; Referee: Mongkolchai Pechsri (Thailand)
	Penalties
	Paartalu (penalty scored); Lewis (penalty scored); Bheke (penalty missed); Chhetri (penalty scored); Brown (penalty missed); Shrivas (penalty missed)		(penalty scored) Hamza; (penalty missed) Mukhammad; (penalty missed) Planić; (penalty scored) Aisam; (penalty scored) Waheed; (penalty scored) Nihan

4–4 on aggregate. Maziya won 4–3 on penalties.

== Coaching staff ==
=== Management ===
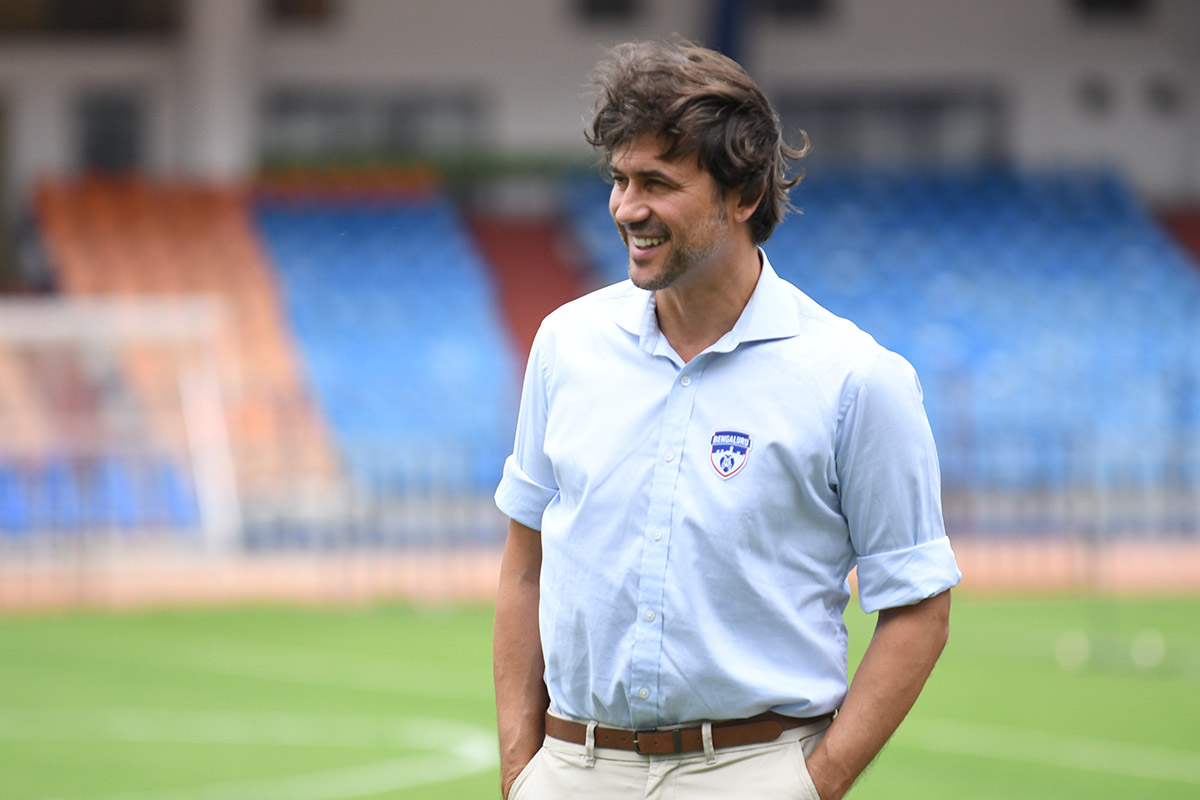
Carles Cuadrat, Bengaluru FC's head coach for 2019–20 season

Carles Cuadrat extended his contract for two years with the club after the successful 2018–19 season.

As of 30 January 2020

Position	Name
Head coach	(Spain) Carles Cuadrat
Assistant coach	(Spain) Javier Pinillos
Assistant coach/ Head coach (reserve team)	(India) Naushad Moosa
Goalkeeping coach	(Spain) Julen Esnaola
Fitness coach	(Spain) Mikel Guillén

== Player statistics ==
=== Appearances and goals ===
No.	Pos	Nat	Player	Total		ISL		AFC	
No.	Pos	Nat	Player	Apps	Goals	Apps	Goals	Apps	Goals
Goalkeepers
1	GK	(India) IND	Gurpreet Singh Sandhu	22	0	19+0	0	3+0	0
31	GK	(India) IND	Prabhsukhan Singh Gill	2	0	1+0	0	1+0	0
32	GK	(India) IND	Aditya Patra	0	0	0+0	0	0+0	0
Defenders
2	DF	(India) IND	Rahul Bheke	17	1	14+2	1	1+0	0
3	DF	(Spain) ESP	Albert Serrán	17	1	16+1	1	0+0	0
4	DF	(India) IND	Sairuat Kima	1	0	1+0	0	0+0	0
5	DF	(Spain) ESP	Juanan	22	2	18+0	1	4+0	1
10	DF	(India) IND	Harmanjot Khabra	22	0	19+0	0	3+0	0
13	DF	(India) IND	Rino Anto	2	0	0+1	0	1+0	0
22	DF	(India) IND	Nishu Kumar	20	1	17+1	1	1+1	0
28	DF	(India) IND	Parag Shrivas	3	0	1+0	0	2+0	0
33	DF	(India) IND	Gursimrat Singh Gill	5	0	1+1	0	3+0	0
43	DF	(India) IND	Biswa Kumar Darjee	1	0	0+0	0	0+1	0
	DF	(India) IND	Namgyal Bhutia	0	0	0+0	0	0+0	0
	DF	(India) IND	Johnson Singh Laishram	0	0	0+0	0	0+0	0
Midfielders
6	MF	(Australia) AUS	Erik Paartalu	21	2	16+1	2	4+0	0
7	MF	(India) IND	Eugeneson Lyngdoh	5	0	0+5	0	0+0	0
8	MF	(India) IND	Kean Lewis	8	0	0+5	0	3+0	0
12	MF	(Brazil) BRA	Raphael Augusto	9	0	9+0	0	0+0	0
14	MF	(Spain) ESP	Dimas Delgado	20	1	20+0	1	0+0	0
27	MF	(India) IND	Suresh Singh Wangjam	15	0	7+5	0	3+0	0
29	MF	(Spain) ESP	Nili Perdomo	10	2	2+4	0	4+0	2
38	MF	(India) IND	Leon Augustine	5	0	1+1	0	1+2	0
	MF	(India) IND	Emmanuel Lalchhanchhuaha	0	0	0+0	0	0+0	0
46	MF	(India) IND	Amay Morajkar	1	0	0+0	0	0+1	0
Forwards
11	FW	(India) IND	Sunil Chhetri	19	11	17+0	9	0+2	2
17	FW	(Jamaica) JAM	Kevaughn Frater	4	1	1+3	1	0+0	0
18	FW	(India) IND	Thongkhosiem Haokip	17	6	1+13	1	3+0	5
19	FW	(India) IND	Ashique Kuruniyan	20	1	12+5	1	3+0	0
21	FW	(India) IND	Udanta Singh	22	1	15+4	1	1+2	0
26	FW	(Jamaica) JAM	Deshorn Brown	10	7	6+1	3	2+1	4
45	FW	(India) IND	Roshan Singh	1	0	0+0	0	1+0	0
	FW	(India) IND	Advait Shinde	0	0	0+0	0	0+0	0
	FW	(India) IND	Sridarth Nongmeikapam	0	0	0+0	0	0+0	0
Players transferred out during the season
9	FW	(Spain) ESP	Manuel Onwu	6	0	5+1	0	0+0	0
25	MF	(India) IND	Ajay Chhetri	0	0	0+0	0	0+0	0
37	FW	(India) IND	Edmund Lalrindika	2	0	0+2	0	0+0	0

- Source: soccerway

Updated: 8 March 2020

=== Top scorers ===
Rank	No.	Pos	Nat	Player	ISL	AFC	Total
1	11	FW	(India)	Sunil Chhetri	9	2	11
2	26	FW	(Jamaica)	Deshorn Brown	3	4	7
3	18	FW	(India)	Thongkhosiem Haokip	1	5	6
4	5	DF	(Spain)	Juanan	1	1	2
4	6	MF	(Australia)	Erik Paartalu	2	0	2
4	29	MF	(Spain)	Nili	0	2	2
7	2	DF	(India)	Rahul Bheke	1	0	1
7	3	DF	(Spain)	Albert Serrán	1	0	1
7	14	MF	(Spain)	Dimas Delgado	1	0	1
7	17	FW	(Jamaica)	Kevaughn Frater	1	0	1
7	19	FW	(India)	Ashique Kuruniyan	1	0	1
7	21	FW	(India)	Udanta Singh	1	0	1
7	22	DF	(India)	Nishu Kumar	1	0	1
Own goals					1	0	1
TOTALS					24	14	38

Source: soccerway
Updated: 8 March 2020

=== Clean sheets ===
Rank	No.	Pos	Nat	Player	ISL	AFC	Total
1	1	GK	(India)	Gurpreet Singh Sandhu	11	1	12
2	31	GK	(India)	Prabhsukhan Singh Gill	0	0	0
TOTALS					11	1	12

Source: soccerway
Updated: 8 March 2020

=== Disciplinary record ===
Rank	No.	Pos	Nat	Player	ISL		AFC		Total		Notes
Rank	No.	Pos	Nat	Player	Yellow card	Red card	Yellow card	Red card	Yellow card	Red card	Notes
1	10	DF	(India)	Harmanjot Khabra	5	0	2	0	7	0	Missed a game, against Chennaiyin (4 yellow cards) (9 February 2020); Missed a game, against Maziya (2 yellow cards) (26 February 2020)
2	5	DF	(Spain)	Juanan	5	0	0	0	5	0	Missed a game, against Kerala Blasters (4 yellow cards) (15 February 2020)
2	11	FW	(India)	Sunil Chhetri	4	0	1	0	5	0	Missed a game, against Kerala Blasters (4 yellow cards) (15 February 2020)
2	19	MF	(India)	Ashique Kuruniyan	4	0	1	0	5	0	
5	22	DF	(India)	Nishu Kumar	3	1	0	0	3	1	
6	3	DF	(Spain)	Albert Serrán	3	0	0	0	3	0	
6	6	MF	(Australia)	Erik Paartalu	3	0	0	0	3	0	
6	14	MF	(Spain)	Dimas Delgado	3	0	0	0	3	0	
6	26	FW	(Jamaica)	Deshorn Brown	2	0	1	0	3	0	
6	27	MF	(India)	Suresh Singh Wangjam	1	0	2	0	3	0	Missed a game, against Maziya (2 yellow cards) (19 February 2020)
6	29	MF	(Spain)	Nili	1	0	2	0	3	0	
12	12	MF	(Brazil)	Raphael Augusto	2	0	0	0	2	0	
13	7	MF	(India)	Eugeneson Lyngdoh	1	0	0	0	1	0	
13	17	FW	(Jamaica)	Kevaughn Frater	1	0	0	0	1	0	
13	21	FW	(India)	Udanta Singh	1	0	0	0	1	0	
13	33	DF	(India)	Gursimrat Singh Gill	1	0	0	0	1	0	
TOTALS					40	1	9	0	49	1	

Source: soccerway
Updated: 8 March 2020

== Awards ==
=== Player of the Month award ===
Awarded monthly to the player that was chosen by fan voting

Month	Player	Votes
October	(Brazil) Raphael Augusto	39%
November	(India) Sunil Chhetri	44%
December	(Spain) Dimas Delgado	50%
January	(Australia) Erik Paartalu	64%
February	(India) Thongkhosiem Haokip	56%

== See also ==
- 2019–20 in Indian football
