= 2019–20 Mumbai City FC season =

2019–20 football season for Mumbai City Football Club

Mumbai City FC
2019–20 season
- Owner: City Football Group Ranbir Kapoor; Bimal Parekh
- Stadium: Mumbai Football Arena
- ISL: 5th
- Play-offs: DNQ
- Top goalscorer: Amine Chermiti (6)

The 2019–20 Mumbai City FC season was the club's sixth season since its establishment in 2014 and their sixth season in the Indian Super League.

== Players ==
=== Current squad ===
As of 17 September 2019

Note: Flags indicate national team as defined under FIFA eligibility rules; some limited exceptions apply. Players may hold more than one non-FIFA nationality.

No.	Pos.	Nation	Player
1	GK	(India) IND	Amrinder Singh (captain)
2	DF	(India) IND	Mohammad Rakip
3	DF	(India) IND	Anwar Ali
4	DF	(Croatia) CRO	Mato Grgić
5	MF	(India) IND	Sourav Das
7	FW	(Gabon) GAB	Serge Kevyn
8	MF	(India) IND	Mohammed Rafique
9	FW	(Tunisia) TUN	Amine Chermiti
10	MF	(Portugal) POR	Paulo Machado (captain)
11	MF	(India) IND	Raynier Fernandes
12	MF	(India) IND	Bidyananda Singh
14	MF	(India) IND	Rowllin Borges
15	DF	(India) IND	Subhasish Bose
16	DF	(India) IND	Sarthak Golui

No.	Pos.	Nation	Player
17	FW	(India) IND	Pranjal Bhumij
18	FW	(Brazil) BRA	Diego Carlos
19	MF	(India) IND	Vignesh Dakshinamurthy
21	MF	(Tunisia) TUN	Mohamed Larbi
22	GK	(India) IND	Ravi Kumar
23	DF	(India) IND	Souvik Chakrabarti
25	FW	(India) IND	Alen Deory
27	MF	(India) IND	Surchandra Singh
28	FW	(Senegal) SEN	Modou Sougou
29	MF	(India) IND	Bipin Singh
30	GK	(India) IND	Kunal Sawant
31	DF	(India) IND	Hmingthanmawia
32	DF	(India) IND	Davinder Singh

=== Out on Loan ===
As of

Note: Flags indicate national team as defined under FIFA eligibility rules; some limited exceptions apply. Players may hold more than one non-FIFA nationality.

No.	Pos.	Nation	Player
—	DF	(India) IND	Bikramjeet Singh (to (India) Mohun Bagan A.C. until 31 May 2020)

== Competitions ==
=== Indian Super League ===
==== League table ====
Pos	Team	Pld	W	D	L	GF	GA	GD	Pts	Qualification
3	Bengaluru (Note: Originally, Mohun Bagan, the 2019–20 I-League champions (they were already assured of the title before the league was abandoned due to the COVID-19 pandemic in India), would qualify as India 2 (2021 AFC Cup group stage), and ATK, the 2020 Indian Super League playoffs winners, would qualify as India 3 (2021 AFC Cup qualifying play-offs). However, ATK owners KGSPL ceased their football operation and bought majority stakes in Mohun Bagan FC (India) Private Limited and rebranded Mohun Bagan football team as ATK Mohun Bagan FC from the 2020–21 Indian Super League which qualified as India 2 in 2021 AFC club competition. The All India Football Federation decided that Bengaluru FC, the 2019–20 Indian Super League regular season 3rd place (behind FC Goa, which qualified for the 2021 AFC Champions League, and ATK), will qualify as India 3.)	18	8	6	4	22	13	+9	30	Qualification for 2021 AFC Cup play-off round and ISL playoffs
4	Chennaiyin	18	8	5	5	32	26	+6	29	Advance to ISL playoffs
5	Mumbai City	18	7	5	6	25	29	−4	26	
6	Odisha	18	7	4	7	28	31	−3	25	
7	Kerala Blasters	18	4	7	7	29	32	−3	19	

Source: Indian Super League
Rules for classification: 1) points; 2) head-to-head points; 3) head-to-head goal difference; 4) head-to-head goals scored; 5) goal difference; 5) number of goals scored; 6) fair play ranking; 6) drawing of lots

==== Results by matchday ====
Matchday	1	2	3	4	5	6	7	8	9	10	11	12	13	14	15	16	17	18
Ground	A	A	H	H	A	A	H	A	A	H	H	A	H	A	H	H	A	H
Result	W	D	L	L	D	D	D	W	W	W								
Position	4	4	5	8	7	7	6	6	5	4								

Updated to match(es) played on 29 December 2019. Source: soccerway
A = Away; H = Home; W = Win; D = Draw; L = Loss

==== Matches ====
League stage

24 October 2019 1	Kerala Blasters	0–1	Mumbai City	Kochi
19:30 IST (UTC+05:30)	Gnig (yellow card) 45'; Rodrigues (yellow card) 64'	Report	Grgic (yellow card) 40'; Golui (yellow card) 61'; Chermiti 82'	Stadium: Jawaharlal Nehru Stadium; Attendance: 28,445; Referee: Metei; Man of the Match: Chermiti (Mumbai)

27 October 2019 2	Chennaiyin	0–0	Mumbai City	Chennai
19:30 IST (UTC+05:30)		Report	Fernandes (yellow card) 29'; Borges (yellow card) 33'; Chakrabarti (yellow card) 48' (yellow-red card) 90+4'; Larbi (yellow card) 56'	Stadium: Jawaharlal Nehru Stadium; Referee: Gupta; Man of the Match: Golui (Mumbai)

31 October 2019 3	Mumbai City	2–4	Odisha	Mumbai
19:30 IST (UTC+05:30)	Singh (yellow card) 35'; Larbi 51' (pen.); Fernandes (yellow card) 58'; Singh 90+5'	Report	Hernández 6'; Rai (yellow card) 11'; Santana 21', 73' (yellow card) 37'; Mawihmingthanga 41'	Stadium: Mumbai Football Arena; Attendance: 5,517; Referee: Arumughan; Man of the Match: Mawihmingthanga (Odisha)

7 November 2019 4	Mumbai City	2–4	Goa	Mumbai
19:30 IST (UTC+05:30)	Golui 49'; Chakrabarti 55' (yellow card) 70'	Report	Rodrigues 27'; Coro 45'; Boumous 59'; Fernandes (yellow card) 80'; Peña 89'	Stadium: Mumbai Football Arena; Attendance: 7,021; Referee: Bora; Man of the Match: Rodrigues (Goa)

27 November 2019 5	NorthEast United	2–2	Mumbai City	Guwahati
19:30 IST (UTC+05:30)	Triadis 9'; Gyan 42'	Report	Chermiti 23', 32' (yellow card) 50'; Sougou (yellow card) 50'; Bose (yellow card) 80'	Stadium: Indira Gandhi Athletic Stadium; Attendance: 17,942; Referee: Thakur; Man of the Match: Gyan (NorthEast)

30 November 2019 6	ATK	2–2	Mumbai City	Kolkata
19:30 IST (UTC+05:30)	Soosairaj 38'; Edathodika (yellow card) 81'; Krishna 90+6'	Report	Bose (yellow card) 30'; Chaudhari 62'; Kevyn (yellow card) 89' (goal) 90+3'	Stadium: Salt Lake Stadium; Attendance: 33,515; Referee: Gupta; Man of the Match: Kevyn (Mumbai City)

5 December 2019 7	Mumbai City	1–1	Kerala Blasters	Mumbai
19:30 IST (UTC+05:30)	Fernandes (yellow card) 24'; Borges (yellow card) 44'; Chermiti 77'	Report	Drobarov (yellow card) 19'; Bouli 75'	Stadium: Mumbai Football Arena; Attendance: 6,327; Referee: Metei; Man of the Match: Thounaojam (Kerala)

15 December 2019 8	Bengaluru	2–3	Mumbai City	Bengaluru
19:30 IST (UTC+05:30)	Kuruniyan (yellow card) 44'; Grgić 58' (o.g.); Lyngdoh (yellow card) 87'; Chhetri 89' (pen.); Augusto (yellow card) 90+3'	Report	Bose 12'; Sougou (yellow card) 21'; Borges (yellow card) 34' (goal) 90+4'; Singh (yellow card) 45+1'; Fernandes (yellow card) 24'; Chermiti (yellow card) 45+3'; Carlos 77' (yellow card) 90+5'; Golui (yellow card) 88'	Stadium: Sree Kanteerava Stadium; Attendance: 13,950; Referee: Alkhudhayr; Man of the Match: Borges (Mumbai)

19 December 2019 9	Jamshedpur	1–2	Mumbai City	Jamshedpur
19:30 IST (UTC+05:30)	Tiri 37'; Piti (yellow card) 58'; Passi (yellow card) 60'; Gahlot (yellow card) 79'; Monroy (yellow card) 85'	Report	Machado 15'; Grgić (yellow card) 47'; Borges (yellow card) 49'; Fernandes 56'; Carlos (yellow card) 87'	Stadium: JRD Tata Sports Complex; Attendance: 19,572; Referee: R Venkatesh; Man of the Match: Machado (Mumbai)

29 December 2019 10	Mumbai City	2–1	Hyderabad	Mumbai
19:30 IST (UTC+05:30)	Sougou 6', 78'; Golui (yellow card) 24' (yellow-red card) 68'; Chaudhari (yellow card) 51'; Kevyn (yellow card) 70'; Carlos (yellow card) 77'	Report	Bobô 81'	Stadium: Mumbai Football Arena; Attendance: 5,500; Referee: C. R. Srikrishna; Man of the Match: Sougou (Mumbai)

=== Indian Super Cup ===
29 March 2019 Round of 16	Chennaiyin	2–0	Mumbai City	Bhubaneswar
20:30 IST	Vineeth 42'; Lalpekhlua 43'	Report		Stadium: Kalinga Stadium; Attendance: 300; Referee: Ajit Meetei
