= 2019–20 Indian Super League =

6th season of the Indian Super League

Indian Super League
- Season: 2019–20
- Dates: 20 October 2019 – 14 March 2020
- Champions: ATK; 3rd ISL Cup title 1st Indian title
- League Winners' Shield: Goa; 1st ISL Shield title
- AFC Champions League: Goa
- AFC Cup: ATK; Bengaluru
- Matches: 95
- Goals: 294 (3.09 per match)
- Top goalscorer: Bartholomew Ogbeche; Nerijus Valskis; Roy Krishna (15 goals each)
- Best goalkeeper: Gurpreet Singh Sandhu (122.14 mins per goal)
- Biggest home win: ATK 5–0 Hyderabad (25 October 2019)
- Biggest away win: Jamshedpur 0–5 Goa (19 February 2020)
- Highest scoring: Kerala Blasters 3–6 Chennaiyin (1 February 2020)
- Longest winning run: Goa (5 games)
- Longest unbeaten run: Chennaiyin (9 games)
- Longest winless run: Hyderabad; NorthEast United (14 games)
- Longest losing run: Hyderabad (4 games)
- Highest attendance: 50,102; ATK 3–1 Bengaluru (8 March 2020)
- Lowest attendance: 1,000; NorthEast United 0–0 Kerala Blasters (7 February 2020)
- Total attendance: 1,219,462 (Note: Including attendance of playoff semi-finals. Final was played behind closed doors due to restrictions against the COVID-19 pandemic.)
- Average attendance: 12,973

The 2019–20 Indian Super League season was the sixth season of the Indian Super League, one of the top Indian professional football leagues. The regular season began on 20 October 2019 and concluded on 14 March 2020.

Hyderabad replaced the disbanded Pune City, whereas Delhi Dynamos moved to Bhubaneswar and rebranded as Odisha.

Bengaluru were the defending champions, having won their maiden Indian Super League title by defeating Goa 1–0 in the 2018–19 final. However, both teams were knocked out in the semi-finals, with Bengaluru losing 3–2 on aggregate to ATK and Goa losing 6–5 on aggregate to Chennaiyin. On 14 March 2020, ATK beat Chennaiyin 3–1 in the final, becoming the first club to win three ISL titles.

On 29 November 2019, the AFC association ranking confirmed India's group stage spot in the 2021 AFC Champions League. As winners of the regular season, FC Goa took that spot along with the inaugural League Winners Shield trophy.

== Teams ==
Locations of the Indian Super League teams

=== Stadiums and locations ===
Club	State/Region	City	Home stadium	Capacity
ATK	West Bengal	Kolkata	Salt Lake Stadium	85,000
Bengaluru	Karnataka	Bengaluru	Sree Kanteerava Stadium	25,810
Chennaiyin	Tamil Nadu	Chennai	Jawaharlal Nehru Stadium	20,075
Goa	Goa	Margao	Fatorda Stadium	18,600
Hyderabad	Telangana	Hyderabad	G. M. C. Balayogi Athletic Stadium	30,000
Jamshedpur	Jharkhand	Jamshedpur	JRD Tata Sports Complex	24,424
Kerala Blasters	Kerala	Kochi	Jawaharlal Nehru Stadium	40,000
Mumbai City	Maharashtra	Mumbai	Mumbai Football Arena	7,790
NorthEast United	Assam	Guwahati	Indira Gandhi Athletic Stadium	23,627
Odisha	Odisha	Bhubaneswar	Kalinga Stadium	15,000

=== Personnel and sponsorship ===
Team	Head coach	Captain	Kit manufacturer	Shirt sponsor
ATK	(Spain) Antonio Lopez Habas	(Fiji) Roy Krishna	Nivia Sports	
Bengaluru	(Spain) Carles Cuadrat	(India) Sunil Chettri	Puma	Kia Motors
Chennaiyin	(Scotland) Owen Coyle	(Romania) Lucian Goian	Performax	Apollo Tyres
Goa	(India) Clifford Miranda	(India) Mandar Rao Desai	T10 Sports	Adda52
Hyderabad	(Spain) Albert Roca	(Brazil) Marcelinho	Reyaur Sports	
Jamshedpur	(Spain) Antonio Iriondo	(Spain) Tiri	Nivia Sports	Tata Steel
Kerala Blasters	(Netherlands) Eelco Schattorie	(Nigeria) Bartholomew Ogbeche	Reyaur Sports	Muthoot Group
Mumbai City	(Portugal) Jorge Costa	(India) Amrinder Singh	Sqad Gear	SportsAdda
NorthEast United	(Croatia) Robert Jarni	(Colombia) José David Leudo	Performax	Federal Bank
Odisha	(Spain) Josep Gombau	(Spain) Marcos Tébar	TYKA Sports	Odisha Tourism

=== Managerial changes ===
Team	Outgoing manager	Manner of departure	Date of vacancy	Position in table	Incoming manager	Date of appointment
ATK	(England) Steve Coppell	End of contract	30 April 2019	Pre-season	(Spain) Antonio López Habas	3 May 2019
Kerala Blasters	(Portugal) Nelo Vingada	End of contract	17 March 2019	Pre-season	(Netherlands) Eelco Schattorie	19 May 2019
Jamshedpur	(Spain) César Ferrando	End of contract	5 April 2019	Pre-season	(Spain) Antonio Iriondo	26 July 2019
NorthEast United	(Netherlands) Eelco Schattorie	End of contract	19 May 2019	Pre-season	(Croatia) Robert Jarni	5 August 2019
Chennaiyin	(England) John Gregory	Sacked	30 Nov 2019	8th	(Scotland) Owen Coyle	4 Dec 2019
Hyderabad	(England) Phil Brown	Sacked	11 January 2020	10th	(Spain) Xavier Gurri López	15 January 2020
Goa	(Spain) Sergio Lobera	Mutual Consent	1 February 2020	1st	(India) Clifford Miranda	3 February 2020
NorthEast United	(Croatia) Robert Jarni	Sacked	11 February 2020	9th	(India) Khalid Jamil	11 February 2020

== Foreign players ==
The number of foreign players allowed in the squad is maximum seven and a minimum of six. However, the maximum number of foreign players allowed on the pitch is five.

Team	Player 1	Player 2	Player 3	Player 4	Player 5	Player 6	Player 7
ATK	(Australia) David Williams	(Fiji) Roy Krishna	(Spain) Edu García	(Spain) Javi Hernández	(Spain) Mandi	(Spain) Víctor Mongil	(England) John Johnson
Bengaluru	(Australia) Erik Paartalu	(Jamaica) Kevaughn Frater	(Jamaica) Deshorn Brown	(Spain) Dimas Delgado	(Spain) Juanan	(Spain) Nili Perdomo	(Spain) Albert Serrán
Chennaiyin	(Afghanistan) Masih Saighani	(Brazil) Rafael Crivellaro	(Brazil) Eli Sabiá	(Lithuania) Nerijus Valskis	(Malta) André Schembri	(Romania) Dragoș Firțulescu	(Romania) Lucian Goian
Goa	(France) Hugo Boumous	(Morocco) Ahmed Jahouh	(Senegal) Mourtada Fall	(Spain) Edu Bedia	(Spain) Ferrán Corominas	(Spain) Carlos Peña	
Hyderabad	(Austria) Marko Stanković	(Brazil) Bobô	(Brazil) Marcelinho Pereira	(England) Matthew Kilgallon	(Jamaica) Giles Barnes	(Spain) Rafael Gómez	(Spain) Néstor Gordillo
Jamshedpur	(Brazil) Memo	(Spain) Noé Acosta	(Spain) Sergio Castel	(Spain) David Grande	(Spain) Aitor Monroy	(Spain) Piti	(Spain) Tiri
Kerala Blasters	(Cameroon) Raphaël Messi Bouli	(North Macedonia) Vlatko Drobarov	(Netherlands) Gianni Zuiverloon	(Nigeria) Bartholomew Ogbeche	(Senegal) Moustapha Gning	(Spain) Mario Arqués	(Spain) Sergio Cidoncha
Mumbai City	(Brazil) Diego Carlos	(Croatia) Mato Grgić	(Gabon) Sèrge Kevyn	(Portugal) Paulo Machado	(Senegal) Modou Sougou	(Tunisia) Amine Chermiti	(Tunisia) Mohamed Larbi
NorthEast United	(Colombia) José David Leudo	(Croatia) Mislav Komorski	(Republic of Ireland) Andy Keogh	(Netherlands) Kai Heerings	(Sweden) Simon Lundevall	(Uruguay) Martín Cháves	(Uruguay) Federico Gallego
Odisha	(Argentina) Martín Pérez Guedes	(Senegal) Diawandou Diagne	(Spain) Carlos Delgado	(Spain) Francisco Dorronsoro	(Spain) Xisco Hernández	(Spain) Manuel Onwu	(Spain) Marcos Tébar

== Regular season ==
=== League table ===
Pos	Team	Pld	W	D	L	GF	GA	GD	Pts	Qualification
1	Goa (L)	18	12	3	3	46	23	+23	39	Qualification for 2021 AFC Champions League group stage and ISL playoffs
2	ATK (Note: Originally, Mohun Bagan, the 2019–20 I-League champions (they were already assured of the title before the league was abandoned due to the COVID-19 pandemic in India), would qualify as India 2 (2021 AFC Cup group stage), and ATK, the 2020 Indian Super League playoffs winners, would qualify as India 3 (2021 AFC Cup qualifying play-offs). However, ATK owners KGSPL ceased their football operation and bought majority stakes in Mohun Bagan FC (India) Private Limited and rebranded Mohun Bagan football team as ATK Mohun Bagan FC from the 2020–21 Indian Super League which qualified as India 2 in 2021 AFC club competition. The All India Football Federation decided that Bengaluru FC, the 2019–20 Indian Super League regular season 3rd place (behind FC Goa, which qualified for the 2021 AFC Champions League, and ATK), will qualify as India 3.) (C)	18	10	4	4	33	16	+17	34	Advance to ISL playoffs
3	Bengaluru	18	8	6	4	22	13	+9	30	Qualification for 2021 AFC Cup play-off round and ISL playoffs
4	Chennaiyin	18	8	5	5	32	26	+6	29	Advance to ISL playoffs
5	Mumbai City	18	7	5	6	25	29	−4	26	
6	Odisha	18	7	4	7	28	31	−3	25	
7	Kerala Blasters	18	4	7	7	29	32	−3	19	
8	Jamshedpur	18	4	6	8	22	35	−13	18	
9	NorthEast United	18	2	8	8	16	30	−14	14	
10	Hyderabad	18	2	4	12	21	39	−18	10	

Source: Indian Super League
Rules for classification: 1) points; 2) head-to-head points; 3) head-to-head goal difference; 4) head-to-head goals scored; 5) goal difference; 5) number of goals scored; 6) fair play ranking; 6) drawing of lots
(C) Champions; (L) League Winners' Shield Winners

=== Results ===
Home \ Away	ATK	BEN	CHE	GOA	HFC	JAM	KER	MUM	NEU	OFC
ATK	—	1–0	1–3	2–0	5–0	3–1	0–1	2–2	1–0	3–1
Bengaluru	2–2	—	3–0	2–1	1–0	2–0	1–0	2–3	0–0	3–0
Chennaiyin	0–1	0–0	—	3–4	2–1	4–1	3–1	0–0	2–0	2–2
Goa	2–1	1–1	3–0	—	4–1	0–1	3–2	5–2	2–0	3–0
Hyderabad	2–2	1–1	1–3	0–1	—	1–1	2–1	1–1	0–1	1–2
Jamshedpur	0–3	0–0	1–1	0–5	3–1	—	3–2	1–2	1–1	2–1
Kerala Blasters	2–1	2–1	3–6	2–2	5–1	2–2	—	0–1	1–1	0–0
Mumbai City	0–2	2–0	0–1	2–4	2–1	2–1	1–1	—	1–0	2–4
NorthEast United	0–3	0–2	2–2	2–2	1–5	3–3	0–0	2–2	—	2–1
Odisha	0–0	0–1	2–0	2–4	3–2	2–1	4–4	2–0	2–1	—

Source: Indian Super League
Legend: Blue = home team win; Yellow = draw; Red = away team win.

== Playoffs ==
=== Bracket ===
Semi-finals
1	Goa	1	4	5
4	Chennaiyin	4	2	6
2	ATK	0	3	3
3	Bengaluru	1	1	2

Final
4	Chennaiyin	1
2	ATK	3

=== Semi-finals ===
Team 1	Agg.	Team 2	1st leg	2nd leg
Chennaiyin	6–5	Goa	4–1	2–4
Bengaluru	2–3	ATK	1–0	1–3

=== Final ===
14 March 2020
19:30 IST

ATK	3–1	Chennaiyin
Hernández 10', 90+3'; Garcia 48'	Report	Valskis 69'

Fatorda Stadium, Margao
Attendance: 0
Referee: Kasimov Sherzod (Uzbekistan)

== Season statistics ==
=== Scoring ===
==== Top scorers ====
Rank	Player	Club	Goals
1	(Nigeria) Bartholomew Ogbeche	Kerala Blasters	15
1	(Lithuania) Nerijus Valskis	Chennaiyin	15
1	(Fiji) Roy Krishna	ATK	15
4	(Spain) Ferrán Corominas	Goa	14
5	(France) Hugo Boumous	Goa	11
6	(Spain) Aridane Santana	Odisha	9
6	(India) Sunil Chhetri	Bengaluru	9
8	(Cameroon) Raphaël Messi Bouli	Kerala Blasters	8
9	(Spain) Manuel Onwu	Odisha	7
9	(Spain) Sergio Castel	Jamshedpur	7
9	(Brazil) Marcelinho Pereira	Hyderabad	7
9	(Australia) David Williams	ATK	7
9	(Brazil) Rafael Crivellaro	Chennaiyin	7
9	(India) Lallianzuala Chhangte	Chennaiyin	7

==== Top Indian scorers ====
Rank	Player	Club	Goals
1	Sunil Chhetri	Bengaluru	9
2	Lallianzuala Chhangte	Chennaiyin	7
3	Jackichand Singh	Goa	5
4	Redeem Tlang	NorthEast United	3
4	Michael Soosairaj	ATK	3
6	Liston Colaco	Hyderabad	2
6	Rowllin Borges	Mumbai City	2
6	Bipin Singh	Mumbai City	2
6	Jerry Mawihmingthanga	Odisha	2
6	Brandon Fernandes	Goa	2
6	Manvir Singh	Goa	2
6	Lenny Rodrigues	Goa	2

==== Hat-tricks ====
Result column shows goal tally of player's team first.

No.	Player	For	Against	Result	Date	Ref
1	(Nigeria) Bartholomew Ogbeche	Kerala Blasters	Chennaiyin	3–6 (A)	1 February 2020	
2	(Fiji) Roy Krishna	ATK	Odisha	3–1 (H)	8 February 2020	
3	(Spain) Manuel Onwu	Odisha	Kerala Blasters	4–4 (H)	23 February 2020	

Notes

(H) – Home team
(A) – Away team

=== Assists ===
Rank	Player	Club	Assists
1	(France) Hugo Boumous	Goa	10
2	(Brazil) Rafael Crivellaro	Chennaiyin	8
3	(India) Brandon Fernandes	Goa	7
4	(Lithuania) Nerijus Valskis	Chennayin	6
4	(India) Anirudh Thapa	Chennaiyin	6
4	(Fiji) Roy Krishna	ATK	6
7	(Australia) Erik Paartalu	Bengaluru	5
7	(India) Jerry Mawihmingthanga	Odisha	5
7	(Australia) David Williams	ATK	5
7	(India) Jessel Carneiro	Kerala Blasters	5
7	(Spain) Javi Hernández	ATK	5
7	(Spain) Dimas Delgado	Bengaluru	5
7	(India) Prabir Das	ATK	5

=== Cleansheets ===
Rank	Player	Club	Clean sheets
1	(India) Gurpreet Singh	Bengaluru	11
2	(India) Arindam Bhattacharya	ATK	9
3	(India) Mohammad Nawaz	Goa	5
4	(India) Amrinder Singh	Mumbai City	4
4	(India) Vishal Kaith	Chennaiyin	4
6	(Spain) Francisco Dorronsoro	Odisha	3
6	(India) Subhasish Roy	NorthEast United	3
8	(India) Rehenesh TP	Kerala Blasters	2
8	(India) Subrata Pal	Jamshedpur	2
10	(India) Bilal Khan	Kerala Blasters	1
10	(India) Arshdeep Singh	Odisha	1

=== Discipline ===
==== Player ====
- Most yellow cards: 7
  - Mandi (footballer) (ATK)
  - Germanpreet Singh (Chennaiyin)
  - Vinit Rai (Odisha)
  - Diego Carlos (Mumbai City)
  - Ahmed Jahouh (Goa)
  - Brandon Fernandes (Goa)
- Most red cards: 1
  - Dimple Bhagat (Hyderabad)
  - Abdul Hakku (Kerala Blasters)
  - Sourav Das (Mumbai City)
  - Jitendra Singh (Jamshedpur)
  - Tondonba Singh (Chennaiyin)
  - Bikash Jairu (Jamshedpur)
  - Souvik Chakrabarti (Mumbai City)
  - Saviour Gama (Goa)
  - Sahil Panwar (Hyderabad)
  - Sarthak Golui (Mumbai City)
  - José David Leudo (NorthEast United)
  - Seiminlen Doungel (Goa)
  - Thoi Singh (Chennaiyin)
  - Vinit Rai (Odisha)
  - Carlos Delgado (Odisha)
  - Farukh Choudhary (Jamshedpur)
  - Reagan Singh (NorthEast United)
  - Ahmed Jahouh (Goa)
  - Nishu Kumar (Bengaluru)
  - Eli Sabiá (Chennaiyin)
  - Mourtada Fall (Goa)
  - Edwin Sydney Vanspaul (Chennaiyin)

==== Club ====
- Most yellow cards: 57
  - Mumbai City
- Most red cards: 4
  - Chennaiyin

== Average home attendances ==
As of 8 March 2020

Team	GP	Cumulative	High	Low	Mean
ATK	9	200,917	37,406	8,690	22,324
Jamshedpur	9	181,218	23,157	17,263	20,135
Kerala Blasters	9	157,641	36,298	7,754	17,515
Bengaluru	9	131,592	27,083	9,746	14,621
Goa	9	117,057	17,773	10,212	13,006
Chennaiyin	9	80,777	11,597	7,500	8,975
NorthEast United	9 (Note: NorthEast United Last home matches attendance Data not Published.)	74,280	17,942	1000	8,253
Hyderabad	9	65,699	12,114	3,000	7,299
Odisha	9 (Note: Odisha's first three home matches were not held at Kalinga Stadium.)	56,081	9,452	3,500 (3,816 (Note: Attendance of the second home match for Odisha which was not played at the Kalinga Stadium.))	6,231
Mumbai City	9	47,166	7,021	3,200	5,240
Total	90	1,112,428	37,406	1,000	12,360
Legend	Lowest Highest	Source:			

== Awards ==
=== Hero of the Match ===
Match	Hero of the Match		Match	Hero of the Match		Match	Hero of the Match	
Match	Player	Club	Match	Player	Club	Match	Player	Club
Match 1	(Nigeria) Bartholomew Ogbeche	Kerala Blasters	Match 33	(Australia) David Williams	ATK	Match 65	(Lithuania) Nerijus Valskis	Chennaiyin
Match 2	(Brazil) Raphael Augusto	Bengaluru	Match 34	(India) Chinglensana Singh	Goa	Match 66	(India) Adil Khan	Hyderabad
Match 3	(India) Farukh Choudhary	Jamshedpur	Match 35	(India) Farukh Choudhary	Jamshedpur	Match 67	(Morocco) Hugo Boumous	Goa
Match 4	(India) Seriton Fernandes	Goa	Match 36	(India) Jerry Mawihmingthanga	Odisha	Match 68	(India) Balwant Singh	ATK
Match 5	(Tunisia) Amine Chermiti	Mumbai City	Match 37	(Cameroon) Raphaël Messi Bouli	Kerala Blasters	Match 69	(India) Jackichand Singh	Goa
Match 6	(Australia) David Williams	ATK	Match 38	(Senegal) Mourtada Fall	Goa	Match 70	(India) Nishu Kumar	Bengaluru
Match 7	(Ghana) Asamoah Gyan	NorthEast United	Match 39	(India) Rowllin Borges	Mumbai City	Match 71	(Brazil) Diego Carlos	Mumbai City
Match 8	(India) Sarthak Golui	Mumbai City	Match 40	(Spain) Juanan	Bengaluru	Match 72	(India) Lallianzuala Chhangte	Chennaiyin
Match 9	(India) Udanta Singh	Bengaluru	Match 41	(Portugal) Paulo Machado	Mumbai City	Match 73	(Fiji) Roy Krishna	ATK
Match 10	(India) Farukh Choudhary	Jamshedpur	Match 42	(India) Lallianzuala Chhangte	Chennaiyin	Match 74	(Morocco) Hugo Boumous	Goa
Match 11	(Australia) David Williams	ATK	Match 43	(Brazil) Bobô	Hyderabad	Match 75	(Brazil) Diego Carlos	Mumbai City
Match 12	(India) Jerry Mawihmingthanga	Odisha	Match 44	(Spain) Ferrán Corominas	Goa	Match 76	(India) Lalengmawia	NorthEast
Match 13	(India) Redeem Tlang	NorthEast United	Match 45	(Australia) David Williams	ATK	Match 77	(Fiji) Roy Krishna	ATK
Match 14	(Brazil) Marcelinho	Hyderabad	Match 46	(Morocco) Ahmed Jahouh	Goa	Match 78	(Brazil) Rafael Crivellaro	Chennaiyin
Match 15	(India) Subrata Pal	Jamshedpur	Match 47	(Spain) Aridane Santana	Odisha	Match 79	(Colombia) José David Leudo	NorthEast
Match 16	(Argentina) Maximiliano Barreiro	NorthEast United	Match 48	(Spain) Mario Arqués	Kerala Blasters	Match 80	(Spain) Ferrán Corominas	Goa
Match 17	(India) Lenny Rodrigues	Goa	Match 49	(Senegal) Modou Sougou	Mumbai City	Match 81	(India) Liston Colaco	Hyderabad
Match 18	(Spain) Sergio Cidoncha	Kerala Blasters	Match 50	(India) Sunil Chhetri	Bengaluru	Match 82	(Spain) Xisco Hernández	Odisha
Match 19	(Fiji) Roy Krishna	ATK	Match 51	(India) Sumit Rathi	ATK	Match 83	(Nigeria) Bartholomew Ogbeche	Kerala
Match 20	(Australia) Erik Paartalu	Bengaluru	Match 52	(Nigeria) Bartholomew Ogbeche	Kerala Blasters	Match 84	(India) Edwin Vanspaul	Chennaiyin
Match 21	(India) Sunil Chhetri	Bengaluru	Match 53	(India) Vinit Rai	Odisha	Match 85	(Morocco) Hugo Boumous	Goa
Match 22	(Spain) Aridane Santana	Odisha	Match 54	(India) Lenny Rodrigues	Goa	Match 86	(India) Liston Colaco	Hyderabad
Match 23	(India) Anirudh Thapa	Chennaiyin	Match 55	(India) Ashique Kuruniyan	Bengaluru	Match 87	(Romania) Lucian Goian	Chennaiyin
Match 24	(Spain) Sergio Castel	Jamshedpur	Match 56	(Lithuania) Nerijus Valskis	Chennaiyin	Match 88	(Spain) Edu García	ATK
Match 25	(Ghana) Asamoah Gyan	NorthEast United	Match 57	(Spain) Aridane Santana	Odisha	Match 89	(Spain) Manuel Onwu	Odisha
Match 26	(Lithuania) Nerijus Valskis	Chennaiyin	Match 58	(India) Halicharan Narzary	Kerala Blasters	Match 90	(Uruguay) Martín Cháves	NorthEast
Match 27	(India) Robin Singh	Hyderabad	Match 59	(Spain) Aridane Santana	Odisha	Match 91 (SF)	(India) Anirudh Thapa	Chennaiyin
Match 28	(Gabon) Sèrge Kevyn	Mumbai City	Match 60	(Brazil) Rafael Crivellaro	Chennaiyin	Match 92 (SF)	(Australia) Erik Paartalu	Bengaluru
Match 29	(India) Lenny Rodrigues	Goa	Match 61	(India) Rowllin Borges	Mumbai City	Match 93 (SF)	(Senegal) Mourtada Fall	Goa
Match 30	(India) Farukh Choudhary	Jamshedpur	Match 62	(India) Pritam Kotal	ATK	Match 94 (SF)	(India) Prabir Das	ATK
Match 31	(India) Gurpreet Singh Sandhu	Bengaluru	Match 63	(Spain) Sergio Castel	Jamshedpur	Match 95 (F)	(India) Arindam Bhattacharya	ATK
Match 32	(India) Jeakson Singh	Kerala	Match 64	(Australia) Erik Paartalu	Bengaluru	Source:		

=== ISL Emerging Player of the Match ===
Match	Emerging Player of the Match		Match	Emerging Player of the Match		Match	Emerging Player of the Match	
Match	(India) Player	Club	Match	(India) Player	Club	Match	(India) Player	Club
Match 1	Jeakson Singh	Kerala Blasters	Match 33	Lalthathanga Khawlhring	NorthEast United	Match 65	Laldinliana Renthlei	Chennaiyin
Match 2	Nishu Kumar	Bengaluru	Match 34	Ashish Rai	Hyderabad	Match 66	Sourav Das	Mumbai City
Match 3	Jerry Mawihmingthanga	Odisha	Match 35	Lallianzuala Chhangte	Chennaiyin	Match 67	Mohammad Rakip	Kerala Blasters
Match 4	Mohammad Nawaz	Goa	Match 36	Rohit Kumar	Hyderabad	Match 68	Lalengmawia	NorthEast United
Match 5	Prasanth Karuthadathkuni	Kerala Blasters	Match 37	Sahal Abdul Samad	Kerala Blasters	Match 69	Gaurav Bora	Odisha
Match 6	Michael Soosairaj	ATK	Match 38	Salam Ranjan Singh	ATK	Match 70	Mohammad Yasir	Hyderabad
Match 7	Redeem Tlang	NorthEast United	Match 39	Bipin Singh	Mumbai City	Match 71	Lalengmawia	NorthEast United
Match 8	Lallianzuala Chhangte	Chennaiyin	Match 40	Lalengmawia	NorthEast United	Match 72	Jerry Lalrinzuala	Chennaiyin
Match 9	Ashique Kuruniyan	Bengaluru	Match 41	Farukh Choudhary	Jamshedpur	Match 73	Aniket Jadhav	Jamshedpur
Match 10	Aniket Jadhav	Jamshedpur	Match 42	Lallianzuala Chhangte	Chennaiyin	Match 74	Sahil Panwar	Hyderabad
Match 11	Lallianzuala Chhangte	Chennaiyin	Match 43	Rohit Kumar	Hyderabad	Match 75	Bidyananda Singh	Mumbai City
Match 12	Nanda Kumar Sekar	Odisha	Match 44	Shubham Sarangi	Odisha	Match 76	Lalruatthara	Kerala Blasters
Match 13	Redeem Tlang	NorthEast United	Match 45	Sumit Rathi	ATK	Match 77	Sumit Rathi	ATK
Match 14	Rahul K. P.	Kerala Blasters	Match 46	Seriton Fernandes	Goa	Match 78	Ashique Kuruniyan	Bengaluru
Match 15	Mobashir Rahman	Jamshedpur	Match 47	Shubham Sarangi	Odisha	Match 79	Redeem Tlang	NorthEast United
Match 16	Mohammad Yasir	Hyderabad	Match 48	Rakesh Pradhan	NorthEast United	Match 80	Bipin Singh	Mumbai City
Match 17	Sarthak Golui	Mumbai City	Match 49	Ashish Rai	Hyderabad	Match 81	Liston Colaco	Hyderabad
Match 18	Rahul K. P.	Kerala Blasters	Match 50	Nishu Kumar	Bengaluru	Match 82	Nim Dorjee	NorthEast United
Match 19	Isaac Vanmalsawma	Jamshedpur	Match 51	Michael Soosairaj	ATK	Match 83	Suresh Wangjam	Bengaluru
Match 20	Ashique Kuruniyan	Bengaluru	Match 52	Mohammad Rakip	Kerala Blasters	Match 84	Jerry Lalrinzuala	Chennaiyin
Match 21	Mohammad Rakip	Kerala Blasters	Match 53	Jerry Mawihmingthanga	Odisha	Match 85	Amarjit Kiyam	Jamshedpur
Match 22	Shubham Sarangi	Odisha	Match 54	Mohammad Nawaz	Goa	Match 86	Mohammad Yasir	Hyderabad
Match 23	Vishal Kaith	Chennaiyin	Match 55	Ashique Kuruniyan	Bengaluru	Match 87	Laldinliana Renthlei	Chennaiyin
Match 24	Jitendra Singh	Jamshedpur	Match 56	Lallianzuala Chhangte	Chennaiyin	Match 88	Leon Augustine	Bengaluru
Match 25	Rakesh Pradhan	NorthEast United	Match 57	Jerry Mawihmingthanga	Odisha	Match 89	Jerry Mawihmingthanga	Odisha
Match 26	Shubham Sarangi	Odisha	Match 58	Abdul Hakku	Kerala Blasters	Match 90	Redeem Tlang	NorthEast
Match 27	Ashique Kuruniyan	Bengaluru	Match 59	Jerry Mawihmingthanga	Odisha	Match 91 (SF)	Jerry Lalrinzuala	Chennaiyin
Match 28	Pratik Chaudhari	Mumbai City	Match 60	Vishal Kaith	Chennaiyin	Match 92 (SF)	Suresh Singh Wangjam	Bengaluru
Match 29	Mohammad Rakip	Kerala Blasters	Match 61	Sourav Das	Mumbai City	Match 93 (SF)	Jerry Lalrinzuala	Chennaiyin
Match 30	Narender Gahlot	Jamshedpur	Match 62	Sumit Rathi	ATK	Match 94 (SF)	Ashique Kuruniyan	Bengaluru
Match 31	Vinit Rai	Odisha	Match 63	Amarjit Singh Kiyam	Jamshedpur	Match 95 (F)	Sumit Rathi	ATK
Match 32	Jeakson Singh	Kerala	Match 64	Ashique Kuruniyan	Bengaluru	Source:		

== Season awards ==
Award	Player	Club
Hero of the League	(France) Hugo Boumous	Goa
Golden Boot	(Lithuania) Nerijus Valskis	Chennaiyin
Golden Glove	(India) Gurpreet Singh Sandhu	Bengaluru
Winning Pass of the League	(France) Hugo Boumous	Goa
ISL Emerging Player of the League	(India) Sumit Rathi	ATK

Team of the Season
Goalkeeper	(India) Gurpreet Singh Sandhu (Bengaluru)			
Defence	(India) Prabir Das (ATK)	(Senegal) Mourtada Fall (Goa)	(Romania) Lucian Goian (Chennaiyin)	(India) Jessel Carneiro (Goa)
Midfield	(France) Hugo Boumous (Goa)		(India) Anirudh Thapa (Chennaiyin)	(Brazil) Rafael Crivellaro (Chennaiyin)
Attack	(Fiji) Roy Krishna (ATK)		(Nigeria) Bartholomew Ogbeche (Kerala Blasters)	(Lithuania) Nerijus Valskis (Chennaiyin)

== See also ==
- 2019–20 I-League
- 2019–20 in Indian football
