= Diawandou Diagne =

Senegalese footballer

Personal information
- Full name: Diawandou Diagne Niang
- Date of birth: 28 July 1994 (age 32)
- Place of birth: Thiès, Senegal
- Height: 1.75 m (5 ft 9 in)
- Position: Defensive midfielder

Youth career
- 2008–2012: ASPIRE Academy

Senior career*
Years	Team	Apps	(Gls)
2012–2014	Eupen	69	(1)
2014–2015	Barcelona B	27	(0)
2014–2015	Barcelona	0	(0)
2016–2019	Eupen	93	(2)
2019–2020	Odisha	10	(0)
2021–2023	KTP	9	(0)
2023	Manang Marshyangdi	5	(0)
2024	Manila Digger	0	(0)

International career^{‡}
2011	Senegal U17	6	(0)
2012–2013	Senegal U20	3	(0)
2014–2015	Senegal	2	(0)
- * Club domestic league appearances and goals as of 23 February 2020 ‡ National team caps and goals as of 24 July 2016

Diawandou Diagne Niang (born 28 July 1994) is a Senegalese footballer who plays as a defensive midfielder.

== Club career ==
=== Early career ===
Born in Thiès, Diagne joined ASPIRE Academy in February 2008, aged 13, after being selected as one of the three Senegalese players to join the Qatari club's youth setup. He was one of the final 24 players selected, after competing with other 430,000.

=== Eupen ===
On 6 June 2012, Diagne joined Belgian Second Division side Eupen. He played his first match as a professional on 23 August, starting in a 1–0 home win against Dessel Sport.

Diagne finished his debut season with 32 league appearances (all starts, 2790 minutes of action). On 18 May 2014 he scored his first goal, netting his side's second in a 2–2 home draw against Sint-Truidense.

=== Barcelona ===
On 7 July 2014, Diagne signed a three-year deal with FC Barcelona B. He made his debut for the club on 23 August, starting in a 0–2 away loss against CA Osasuna in the Segunda División championship.

On 16 December 2014 Diagne was called up to the main squad for a Copa del Rey match against SD Huesca, but remained unused in the 8–1 home routing.

=== Odisha ===
On 8 June 2019, Diagne joined the Indian Super League side Delhi Dynamos (now Odisha FC), for the 2019–20 season on a free transfer.

== International career ==
After appearing with the under-17 and under-20s, Diagne made his main squad debut on 31 May 2014, starting and playing the full 90 minutes in a 2–2 draw against Colombia at the Estadio Pedro Bidegain.

== Club statistics ==
As of 23 February 2020

Club	Season	League		Cup		Europe/Asia		Other		Total	
Club	Season	Apps	Goals	Apps	Goals	Apps	Goals	Apps	Goals	Apps	Goals
Eupen
Eupen	2012–13	32	0	1	0	—				33	0
Eupen	2013–14	28	0	2	0	—		6 (Note: 6 appearances in 2013–14 Belgian Second Division play-offs.)	1	36	1
Eupen	Total	60	0	3	0	—		6	1	69	1
Barcelona B	2014–15	27	0	—						27	0
Barcelona B	Total	27	0	—						27	0
Barcelona	2014–15	0	0	—				0	0	0	0
Barcelona	Total	0	0	—				0	0	0	0
Eupen
Eupen	2015–16	16	1	2	0	—				18	1
Eupen	2016–17	28	0	5	0	10	0	—		43	0
Eupen	2017–18	18	1	0	0	8	0	0	0	26	1
Eupen	2018–19	1	0	3	0	1	0	—		5	0
Eupen	Total	63	2	10	0	19	0	0	0	92	2
Odisha	2019–20	10	0	—						10	0
Odisha	Total	10	0	—						10	0
Totals		160	2	13	0	19	0	6	1	200	3

== International statistics ==
As of 4 January 2015

Senegal national team
Year	Apps	Goals
2014	1	0
2015	0	0
Total	1	0
