= Aridane Santana =

Spanish footballer

Aridane
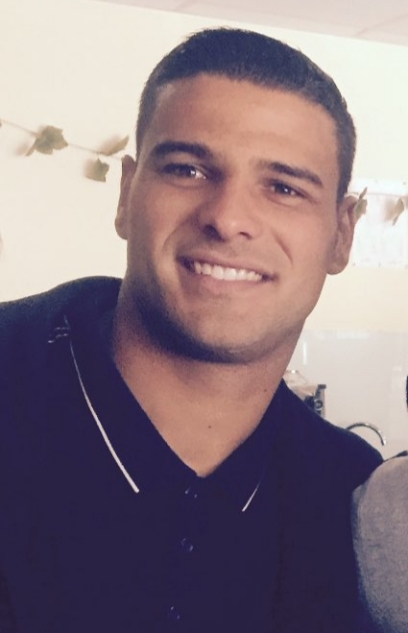
- Aridane in 2017

Personal information
- Full name: Aridane Jesús Santana Cabrera
- Date of birth: 31 March 1987 (age 39)
- Place of birth: Vecindario, Spain
- Height: 1.91 m (6 ft 3 in)
- Position: Striker

Youth career
- Vecindario
- Deportivo La Coruña

Senior career*
Years	Team	Apps	(Gls)
2006–2009	Deportivo B	85	(25)
2009–2010	Zaragoza B	32	(12)
2010–2011	Universidad LP	35	(12)
2011–2012	Leganés	15	(1)
2012–2015	Tenerife	121	(41)
2015	Bangkok Glass	16	(9)
2016	Mirandés	12	(3)
2016–2018	Albacete	62	(19)
2018–2020	Cultural Leonesa	32	(10)
2019–2020	→ Odisha (loan)	14	(9)
2020–2021	Hyderabad	18	(10)
2021–2022	Logroñés	23	(4)
2022–2023	Atlético Paso	28	(6)
2023–2024	Linense	32	(6)
2025	San Fernando	13	(0)
Total		538	(167)
- * Club domestic league appearances and goals

Aridane Jesús Santana Cabrera (born 31 March 1987), known simply as Aridane, is a Spanish former professional footballer who played as a striker.

== Club career ==
Born in Vecindario, Province of Las Palmas, Canary Islands, Aridane finished his youth career with Deportivo de La Coruña, making his senior debut with the B team in the Tercera División. He achieved promotion to Segunda División B in 2007, being relegated two years later.

In the following years, Aridane did not settle with any team, representing Deportivo Aragón in the fourth tier and Universidad de Las Palmas CF and CD Leganés in the third. In January 2012, he signed with CD Tenerife in the latter league, scoring 25 goals in 37 games in his second season (adding two from three appearances in the play-offs) to help the club return to the Segunda División after two years out.

Aridane played his first professional match on 1 September 2013, featuring the last 27 minutes of a 2–0 away loss to CD Mirandés. He scored his first goal seven days later, in a 2–2 home draw against FC Barcelona Atlètic.

On 6 July 2015, aged 28, Aridane terminated his contract with Tenerife and moved abroad for the first time in his career, after agreeing to a two-year deal with Bangkok Glass F.C. in Thailand. On 1 February of the following year he returned to his home country, signing a short-term deal with CD Mirandés in the second division.

On 3 August 2016, Aridane joined Albacete Balompié, recently relegated to the third tier. In his first season in Castilla-La Mancha, he contributed 17 goals in 42 matches as his team were promoted as champions, including the extra time winner in the play-off semi-final against CD Atlético Baleares.

Aridane competed in the Indian Super League from 2019 to 2021, representing Odisha FC and Hyderabad FC.
