= Shubham Sarangi =

Indian footballer

Personal information
- Date of birth: 24 June 2000 (age 26)
- Place of birth: New Delhi, India
- Height: 1.79 m (5 ft 10 1/2 in)
- Position: Right-back

Team information
- Current team: Diamond Harbour
- Number: 15

Youth career
- 2015–2016: Minerva Punjab

Senior career*
| Years | Team | Apps | (Gls) |
| 2018–2019 | Delhi Dynamos | 9 | (0) |
| 2019–2023 | Odisha | 40 | (0) |
| 2024–2025 | Jamshedpur | 12 | (0) |
| 2026– | Diamond Harbour | 0 | (0) |

International career
| 2016–2017 | India U17 | 8 | (0) |
- * Club domestic league appearances and goals as of 22:18, 9 March 2026 (UTC)

Shubham Sarangi (born 24 June 2000) is an Indian professional footballer who plays as a defender for Indian Football League club Diamond Harbour.

== Early life ==
Sarangi was born in New Delhi to parents from Balasore, Odisha, and grew up playing football since his childhood days. During his childhood, he played in Kargil War Martyr Captain Vijayant Thapar Memorial Cup for his Army Public School, Noida. He represented India in 2013 U-14 AFC qualifying tournament held in Iran. Thereafter, he was drafted to the U-17 World Cup project for India and continued training in Goa, traveled to various countries as part of the exposure trip organised by the AIFF.

In 2015–16, he played for the Minerva Punjab F.C. Academy and participated U-15 & U-18 I-League scoring 8 Goals in the League, and was placed among the top goal scorers in the League. He continued to play for India national U-17 squad World Cup football team thereafter.

In 2018, Sarangi went to the Aspire Academy of Qatar for a four-month training stint.

== Club career ==
=== Delhi Dynamos ===
Signed by Delhi Dynamos FC in 2017–18, he was sent to the Aspire Academy, leading international Academy based in Doha, for youth development and training for five and half months. On his return, he made 9 appearances for Delhi Dynamos in the 2018–19 season, playing as a right back.

=== Odisha FC ===
Delhi Dynamos FC were re-branded as Odisha FC prior to the 2019–20 season. Shubham made 17 appearances in the club's inaugural season as Odisha FC.

== Honours ==
Odisha FC

- Indian Super Cup: 2023
