= Carlos Delgado (footballer, born 1990) =

Spanish footballer

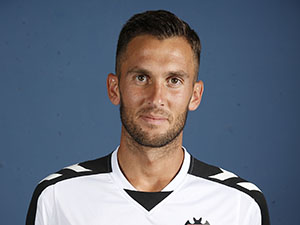
- Delgado with Albacete in 2018

Personal information
- Full name: Carlos Javier Delgado Rodríguez
- Date of birth: 22 April 1990 (age 36)
- Place of birth: Puerto Real, Spain
- Height: 1.82 m (6 ft 0 in)
- Position: Centre-back

Team information
- Current team: Mumbai City
- Number: 5

Youth career
- La Salle
- 2005–2007: Málaga

Senior career*
Years	Team	Apps	(Gls)
2007–2009	Málaga B	15	(1)
2009	Sparta Rotterdam	0	(0)
2009–2010	Valladolid B	31	(2)
2010–2011	Almería B	5	(0)
2011	→ Sparta Rotterdam (loan)	11	(1)
2011–2012	Orihuela	31	(1)
2012–2014	Valencia B	35	(1)
2014–2015	Leganés	12	(0)
2015–2016	Recreativo	31	(0)
2016–2018	Albacete	42	(0)
2018–2021	Castellón	56	(0)
2019–2020	→ Odisha (loan)	16	(1)
2021–2022	Atlético Baleares	36	(1)
2022–2026	Odisha	75	(2)
2026–	Mumbai City	1	(0)
- * Club domestic league appearances and goals as of 13:30, 12 October 2026 (UTC)

Carlos Javier Delgado Rodríguez (Spanish pronunciation: [ˈkaɾlos delˈɣaðo]; born 22 April 1990) is a Spanish professional footballer who plays as a centre-back for Indian Super League club Mumbai City.

== Club career ==
=== Early years and Sparta ===
Born in Puerto Real, Cádiz, Andalusia, Delgado joined Málaga CF's youth system at the age of 15. In early 2008, he rejected a new contract and went on trial with Eredivisie club Sparta Rotterdam, finally signing in January 2009 but failing to make a single appearance, subsequently returning to his country and joining Real Valladolid, who assigned the player to their reserves.

In summer 2010, Delgado signed with another reserve team, UD Almería B. In January of the following year, after playing only five matches in the Segunda División B, he returned to the Netherlands and Sparta on loan. He made his debut for the latter – who now competed in Eerste Divisie – on 28 January, against RBC Roosendaal (4–1 home win). On 11 February, he scored in a 3–2 away victory over FC Dordrecht.

Delgado returned to Spain in July 2011, joining Orihuela CF also in the third division.

=== Valencia ===
On 12 June 2012, Delgado signed a two-year contract with Valencia CF, being initially a part of the B-side setup in the third tier. He made his debut for Mestalla on 26 August against Gimnàstic de Tarragona and, the following month, was called up to train with the main squad by manager Mauricio Pellegrino due to Ricardo Costa's injury; on the 29th, he was an unused substitute for a La Liga game against Real Zaragoza.

Delgado made his competitive debut for the Che on 2 October 2012, playing the full 90 minutes in a 2–0 home defeat of Lille OSC in the group stage of the UEFA Champions League.

=== Leganés ===
On 8 August 2014, Delgado joined CD Leganés who had recently promoted to Segunda División. He made his debut for the club on 23 November, starting in a 1–0 away loss against CD Mirandés.

After appearing in 13 competitive matches, Delgado was released.

=== Recreativo and Albacete ===
On 2 August 2015, Delgado signed a one-year deal with Recreativo de Huelva of the third division. On 28 June 2016 he moved to Albacete Balompié in the same league, and achieved promotion to division two as captain.

=== Later career ===
On 16 July 2018, free agent Delgado agreed to a three-year contract with third-tier CD Castellón. One year later, he was loaned to Indian Super League club Odisha FC.

Delgado spent the 2021–22 season with CD Atlético Baleares in the newly created Primera División RFEF. In June 2022 he returned to Odisha, reuniting with manager Josep Gombau. He made his second debut on 17 August, in a 6–0 rout of NorthEast United FC in the Durand Cup.

On 22 August 2026, Delgado joined Mumbai City FC on a one-year deal.

== Career statistics ==
As of 4 March 2023

Appearances and goals by club, season and competition
Club	Season	League			Cup		Continental		Other		Total	
Club	Season	Division	Apps	Goals	Apps	Goals	Apps	Goals	Apps	Goals	Apps	Goals
Almería B	2010–11	Segunda División B	5	0	0	0	—		—		5	0
Sparta Rotterdam (loan)	2010–11	Eerste Divisie	11	1	0	0	—		—		11	1
Orihuela	2011–12	Segunda División B	31	1	2 (Note: Appearances in Copa del Rey)	0	—		—		33	1
Valencia	2012–13	La Liga	0	0	0	0	1 (Note: Appearance in UEFA Champions League)	0	—		1	0
Valencia B	2012–13	Segunda División B	12	0	0	0	—		—		12	0
Valencia B	2013–14	Segunda División B	23	1	0	0	—		—		23	1
Valencia B	Total		35	1	0	0	0	0	0	0	35	1
Leganés	2014–15	Segunda División	12	0	1	0	—		—		13	0
Recreativo	2015–16	Segunda División B	31	0	1	0	—		—		32	0
Albacete	2016–17	Segunda División B	25	0	1	0	—		5 (Note: Appearances in Segunda División B play-offs)	0	31	0
Albacete	2017–18	Segunda División	17	0	0	0	—		—		17	0
Albacete	Total		42	0	1	0	0	0	5	0	48	0
Castellón	2018–19	Segunda División B	33	0	2	0	—		—		35	0
Castellón	2020–21	Segunda División	23	0	1	0	—		—		24	0
Castellón	Total		56	0	3	0	0	0	0	0	59	0
Odisha (loan)	2019–20	Indian Super League	16	1	0	0	—		—		16	1
Atlético Baleares	2021–22	Primera División RFEF	36	1	3	0	—		—		39	1
Odisha	2022–23	Indian Super League	21	0	4 (Note: Appearances in Durand Cup)	0	—		1 (Note: Appearance in playoff for AFC Cup)	0	26	0
Career total			296	5	15	0	1	0	6	0	318	5

== Honours ==
Odisha

- Super Cup: 2023
