= Francisco Dorronsoro =

Spanish footballer

Personal information
- Full name: Francisco Ramón Dorronsoro Sánchez
- Date of birth: 22 May 1985 (age 41)
- Place of birth: Torrelavega, Spain
- Height: 1.80 m (5 ft 11 in)
- Position: Goalkeeper

Team information
- Current team: Ejea
- Number: 13

Youth career
- Gimnástica
- Zaragoza

Senior career*
Years	Team	Apps	(Gls)
2004–2005	Universidad Zaragoza	15	(0)
2005–2009	Zaragoza B	78	(0)
2009–2012	Alcoyano	18	(0)
2012–2013	Alcorcón	1	(0)
2013–2016	Albacete	53	(0)
2016–2018	Lorca	71	(0)
2018–2020	Delhi Dynamos	25	(0)
2020–2022	Badalona	20	(0)
2022–2023	Tarazona	29	(0)
2023–2025	Numancia	24	(0)
2025–	Ejea	15	(0)
- * Club domestic league appearances and goals as of 14 May 2026

Francisco Ramón Dorronsoro Sánchez (born 22 May 1985) is a Spanish footballer who plays for Segunda Federación club Ejea as a goalkeeper.
