= Vinit Rai =

Indian footballer (born 1997)

Personal information
- Full name: Vinit Rai Chamling
- Date of birth: 10 October 1997 (age 29)
- Place of birth: Duliajan, Assam, India
- Height: 1.82 m (6 ft 0 in)
- Positions: Central midfielder; defensive midfielder

Team information
- Current team: Punjab
- Number: 16

Youth career
- 2010–2014: Tata Football Academy
- 2014: Dempo

Senior career*
Years	Team	Apps	(Gls)
2014–2016	Dempo	2	(0)
2016–2017	Kerala Blasters	2	(0)
2017	→ Minerva Punjab (loan)	4	(0)
2017–2023	Odisha	68	(1)
2021–2023	→ Mumbai City (loan)	20	(2)
2023–2024	Mumbai City	15	(0)
2024–	Punjab	16	(0)

International career^{‡}
2015–2019	India U23	7	(0)
2018–	India	11	(0)
- * Club domestic league appearances and goals as of 17:48, 11 May 2026 (UTC) ‡ National team caps and goals as of 21:10, 19 November 2019 (UTC)

Vinit Rai Chamling (born 10 November 1997) is an Indian professional footballer who plays as a midfielder for Indian Super League club Punjab and the India national team.

== Club career ==
Born in Duliajan, Assam, Rai was scouted by the Duliajan Football Academy and later by the Tata Football Academy at the age of 13 and trained there for four years. After graduating from Tata, Rai signed with I-League side Dempo. On signing Rai, Dempo head coach at the time, Arthur Papas said "Vinit is a very cultured midfielder with a great range of passing. He has a willingness to always want the ball and link the play between the defensive and forward lines." Rai would enter the 2014–15 season with Dempo as the youngest first-team player. After spending a majority of the season playing for the club's youth team, Rai made his professional debut for Dempo in the league on 1 March 2015 against East Bengal. He came on as an 81st-minute substitute for Jewel Raja as Dempo lost 5–1.

=== Kerala Blasters ===
After helping Dempo regain promotion to the I-League, Rai signed with Indian Super League side Kerala Blasters on 6 September 2016. He made his debut for the team on 1 October 2016 against NorthEast United. He started the match and played 76 minutes as Kerala Blasters fell 1–0.

=== Minerva Punjab ===
After the ISL 2016 season, Vinit Rai signed with Minerva FC and will make its debut in I-league this season.

=== Odisha FC ===
Rai joined Odisha FC for the 2019–20 ISL season as a midfielder. He also captained the team.

==== Loan to Mumbai City ====
In 2022, Rai was loaned out to Indian Super League defending champions Mumbai City from Odisha. He was later included in club's 2022 AFC Champions League squad.

== International ==
Rai made his debut for the India under-23 side on 27 March 2015 against Uzbekistan U23 in the 2016 AFC U23 Championship qualifiers. He played 80 minutes as India U23 fell 2–0. Almost a year later, Rai made his debut on the bench for the India senior side in their FIFA World Cup qualifier against Iran. He did not come off the bench though. Rai, however, did make his unofficial debut for India in the team's unofficial friendly against Bhutan. He came on as a 64th minute for Rowllin Borges as India won 3–0.

== Career statistics ==
=== Club ===
As of 4 May 2024

Club	Season	League			Cup		AFC		Total	
Club	Season	Division	Apps	Goals	Apps	Goals	Apps	Goals	Apps	Goals
Dempo	2014–15	I-League	2	0	0	0	—		2	0
Kerala Blasters	2016	Indian Super League	2	0	0	0	—		2	0
Minerva Punjab (loan)	2016–17	I-League	4	0	0	0	—		4	0
Odisha	2017–18	Indian Super League	13	0	1 (Note: Appearance(s) in Super Cup)	0	—		14	0
Odisha	2018–19	Indian Super League	16	0	1	0	—		17	0
Odisha	2019–20	Indian Super League	15	1	0	0	—		15	1
Odisha	2020–21	Indian Super League	16	0	0	0	—		16	0
Odisha	2021–22	Indian Super League	8	0	0	0	—		8	0
Odisha	Total		68	1	2	0	0	0	70	1
Mumbai City (loan)	2021–22	Indian Super League	9	0	0	0	5 (Note: Appearance(s) in AFC Champions League)	0	14	0
Mumbai City (loan)	2022–23	Indian Super League	11	2	8 (Note: Appearance(s) in Durand Cup)	0	—		19	2
Mumbai City	2023–24	Indian Super League	15	0	6	0	4	0	25	0
Mumbai City	Total		35	2	14	0	9	0	58	2
Punjab	2024–25	Indian Super League	0	0	0	0	—		0	0
Career total			111	3	16	0	9	0	136	3

=== International ===
As of matches played till 19 November 2019

National team	Year	Apps	Goals
India	2018	6	0
India	2019	5	0
Total		11	0

== Honours ==
Mumbai City

- Indian Super League (Premiership): 2022–23
- Durand Cup runner-up: 2022

India

- SAFF Championship runner-up: 2018
- King's Cup third place: 2019

India U23

- South Asian Games Silver medal: 2016
