= Bidyananda Singh =

Indian footballer

Personal information
- Full name: Bidyananda Singh Ningthoujam
- Date of birth: 27 November 1997 (age 28)
- Place of birth: Moirang, Manipur, India
- Height: 1.65 m (5 ft 5 in)
- Position: Midfielder

Team information
- Current team: TRAU
- Number: 17

Youth career
- 2008–2012: Sport Authority of India
- 2012–2016: AIFF Elite Academy
- 2017–2018: Bengaluru

Senior career*
Years	Team	Apps	(Gls)
2016–2017	ATK	6	(0)
2017–2019	Bengaluru B	8	(0)
2019–2021	Mumbai City	10	(1)
2021–2022	Mohun Bagan	3	(0)
2022–2023	RoundGlass Punjab	1	(0)
2023–	TRAU	7	(1)

International career^{‡}
2010	India U13	?	(?)
2013	India U19	1	(0)
- * Club domestic league appearances and goals as of 22:42, 12 March 2023 (UTC) ‡ National team caps and goals as of 16 June 2017

Bidyananda Singh Ningthoujam (born 27 November 1997) is an Indian professional footballer who plays as a midfielder for I-League club TRAU.

== Career ==
=== Early career ===
Born in Manipur, to a Hindu Meitei family. Bidyananda was selected for the Sports Authority of India in 2008 at the age of 11. The move to the Sports Authority of India was a major decision for Singh, as it allowed his family to not have to pay for his care as the academy would pay for his football coaching and his food: "Moving to the SAI complex meant that my parents didn’t have to worry about my meals, nor did they have to worry about my equipment as the academy provided me with the boots and kit." Singh soon impressed scouts from the All India Football Federation under-13 side and was called up for international camps. In 2014, he was one of two Indians who played in a one-week camp at the Aspire Academy in Qatar. After the camp, Bidyananda became the second Indian, after Milan Basumatary, to be selected into the tournament all-star side. Singh also impressed scouts well enough at the tournament to be scouted by Spanish side Barcelona. After returning from Qatar, Singh played for the AIFF Elite Academy.

=== Atlético Kolkata ===
On 14 June 2016 it was announced that Bidyananda, along with a host of other Indian players, had signed with Atlético Kolkata of the Indian Super League. He made his professional debut for the team on 25 October 2016 against Mumbai City.

=== Bengaluru ===
On 31 July 2017 Bidyananda signed two-year contract with Bengaluru.

=== Mohun Bagan ===
In 2021, Mohun Bagan have completed signing Bidyananda Singh from Mumbai City FC on a one-year dal. He don't get many chance's that season besides some substitute playing time. He left ATKMB after his contract period ended.

=== RoundGlass Punjab ===
In 2022, RoundGlass Punjab completed signing Bidyananda Singh from Mohun Bagan

== International ==
Bidyananda has played for India at the under-13 and under-19 levels.

== Career statistics ==
=== Club ===
As of 12 March 2023

Club	Season	League			Cup		AFC		Total	
Club	Season	Division	Apps	Goals	Apps	Goals	Apps	Goals	Apps	Goals
ATK	2016	Indian Super League	6	0	0	0	—		6	0
Bengaluru B	2017–18	I-League 2nd Division	8	0	0	0	1 (Note: Appearance(s) in AFC Cup)	0	9	0
Bengaluru	2018–19	Indian Super League	0	0	0	0	—		0	0
Mumbai City	2019–20	Indian Super League	10	1	0	0	—		10	1
Mumbai City	2020–21	Indian Super League	0	0	0	0	—		0	0
Mumbai City	Mumbai City total		10	1	0	0	0	0	10	1
Mohun Bagan	2021–22	Indian Super League	3	0	0	0	4	0	7	0
RoundGlass Punjab	2022–23	I-League	1	0	0	0	—		1	0
TRAU	2022–23	I-League	7	1	0	0	—		7	1
Career total			35	2	0	0	5	0	40	2

== Honours ==
Atletico de Kolkata

- Indian Super League: 2016
