= Mohamed Larbi =

Tunisian footballer (born 1987)

Personal information
- Full name: Mohamed Wael Larbi
- Date of birth: 2 September 1987 (age 39)
- Place of birth: Soliman, Tunisia
- Height: 1.86 m (6 ft 1 in)
- Position: Midfielder

Senior career*
Years	Team	Apps	(Gls)
2009–2010	Compiègne	27	(0)
2010–2011	Saint-Pryvé Saint-Hilaire	14	(1)
2011–2013	Luçon	72	(13)
2013–2017	Gazélec Ajaccio	76	(16)
2017	Sochaux	13	(0)
2017–2018	Samsunspor	1	(0)
2018	Tours	13	(0)
2018–2019	ES Tunis	6	(1)
2019–2020	Mumbai City	14	(2)
2020–2021	SO Cholet	20	(4)

International career^{‡}
2016–	Tunisia	4	(0)
- * Club domestic league appearances and goals as of 15 May 2021 ‡ National team caps and goals as of 17 May 2018

Mohamed Larbi (born 2 September 1987) is a Tunisian professional footballer who plays as a midfielder.

== Career ==
=== FC Nantes ===
Larbi hails from the famous FC Nantes Academy where he played from age 13 to 18. He was featured in the documentary "L'Académie du Foot" alongside Dimitri Payet. Larbi was one of the pillar of the FC Nantes team which reached the finals of the 2004 Montaigu U16 tournament, losing to Karim Benzema's Olympique Lyon team. He signed his first professional contract in 2005, with Espérance Sportive de Tunis, one the leading teams in the Tunisian league.

=== Etoile Sportive du Sahel, Menton, AFC Compiègne, St-Pryvé St-Hilaire ===
After an unsuccessful experience in Tunisia, Larbi decided to return to France to play in the semi-pro divisions with Menton, AFC Compiègne and St-Privé St-Hilaire.

=== Luçon VF ===
Larbi signed with Luçon in third-tier Championnat National in 2011 on a two-year contract. He played for 1 1/2 seasons, totalling 77 games and 14 goals. He left the team to sign with Gazélec Ajaccio in February 2013.

=== GFC Ajaccio ===
Larbi joined the team for the 2012–2013 season and went on the help the club earn third spot in the Championnat National which secured a return to Ligue 2. During the 2013–2014 season, GFC Ajaccio again won promotion, this time to Ligue 1, with Larbi scoring nine goals.

Larbi made his debut in Ligue 1 in the 2015-2016 season. In his best season by far, he was named twice in the "L'Équipe type de Ligue 1", the best 11 players designated by the newspaper L'Équipe. He played 34 games amassing 9 goals and 3 assists. He scored twice against Girondins de Bordeaux on 31 October 2015 in a 2–1 win and scored another brace against Olympique Lyonnais on 20 December 2015.

In May 2016, Larbi announced that he would not return to GFC Ajaccio for the 2016–2017 season.

In early November 2016, having only played for five minutes in two matches, he was dismissed by the club after failing to attend a warm-down session after a match on 14 October.

=== Mumbai City FC ===
Larbi joined Mumbai City FC for the 2019–20 Indian Super League season. He played 11 games amassing 1 goals and 4 assists. In January 2020 he signed contract extension for remainder of the season.

=== SO Cholet ===
Larbi returned to France with Championnat National side SO Cholet, signing on 31 August 2020.

== International career ==
Larbi made his debut for Tunisia against Togo on 27 March 2016. In May 2018 he was named in Tunisia’s preliminary 29 man squad for the 2018 World Cup in Russia.

== Personal life ==
Larbi holds both Tunisian and French nationalities.
