= Martín Pérez Guedes =

Argentine footballer (born 1991)

Personal information
- Date of birth: 18 August 1991 (age 35)
- Place of birth: Tres Arroyos, Argentina
- Height: 1.79 m (5 ft 10 1/2 in)
- Position: Left midfielder

Youth career
- 2008–2009: Huracán de Tres Arroyos

Senior career*
Years	Team	Apps	(Gls)
2009–2011	Huracán de Tres Arroyos	83	(12)
2011–2012	Olimpo	21	(5)
2012–2019	Racing Club	17	(1)
2013–2014	→ Olimpo (loan)	26	(3)
2015	→ Quilmes (loan)	16	(0)
2016	→ Temperley (loan)	9	(1)
2016–2017	→ Olimpo (loan)	15	(0)
2017–2018	→ Mitre (loan)	24	(1)
2018–2019	→ Defensores de Belgrano (loan)	23	(3)
2019–2020	Odisha	18	(3)
2020–2021	Gimnasia Jujuy	7	(3)
2021	Universidad de San Martín	27	(7)
2022	Melgar	40	(9)
2023–2026	Universitario de Deportes	107	(19)
- * Club domestic league appearances and goals as of 21:58, 3 November 2024 (PST)

Martín Pérez Guedes (born 18 August 1991) is an Argentine former professional footballer who last played as a left midfielder for Peruvian Liga 1 club Universitario de Deportes.

== Career ==
Pérez Guedes played in the youth ranks of Huracán de Tres Arroyos, where he stood out from a young age. His professional career got underway in the Torneo Argentino A with Huracán in 2009, consolidating himself in the first team at 17 years of age. Pérez Guedes scored four goals in his debut season, which were the first of twelve goals in eighty-three appearances over two seasons for the club. In June 2011, he joined Olimpo of the Argentine Primera División. Pérez Guedes made his first division debut with Olimpo on 10 September during a 1–0 loss to Racing Club.

=== Racing Club and loan spells ===
After five goals in twenty-one games in 2011–12 for Olimpo, he signed for Racing Club ahead of the 2012–13 campaign, under manager Luis Zubeldía. In November 2012, Pérez Guedes scored his first goal for Racing after coming from the bench in a 4–0 victory against Quilmes. That year, he also played the 2012 Copa Sudamericana with the club.

In July 2013, due to him not playing regularly in Racing, Olimpo resigned Pérez Guedes on a loan for one season, in which the team would play again in the first division. On September 8, he scored the first two goals of his second spell in Olimpo in a 3–0 victory at home to Boca Juniors. In total, Pérez Guedes scored three goals in twenty-six matches during his temporary spell with Olimpo, with his other goal taking place in a 3–1 away victory against River Plate.

He returned to Racing for the 2014 league season, which the club won, becoming national champions for the first time in 13 years. For the 2015 season, Pérez Guedes was loaned to Quilmes, where he played regularly.

This preceded a loan for the 2016 season with Temperley; however, his loan was rescinded and, on 28 July 2016, he joined Olimpo for a third time; on loan for the second time. Before the loan was signed, Pérez Guedes renewed his contract with Racing until 2019. He featured fifteen times in the 2016–17 Primera División which Olimpo ended 16th.

August 2017 saw him leave Racing Club on loan again, without an option to buy, to Primera B Nacional's Mitre, where Pérez Guedes was considered one of the tournament's best signings. He made his 100th career appearance in April 2018 against Sarmiento. Defensores de Belgrano completed the loan signing of him on 16 August, he played in the club for one season and kept a good performance level.

After three goals in twenty-three games for them, he returned to Racing Club prior to agreeing a move to Indian Super League side Delhi Dynamos, who were later rechristened as Odisha, on 2 July 2019. He made his debut on 22 October in a 2–1 defeat to Jamshedpur, with his first goal arriving in a December victory over Hyderabad. He also scored against NorthEast United and Kerala Blasters, whilst featuring eighteen times.

In August 2020, Pérez Guedes returned to his homeland with Gimnasia y Esgrima de Jujuy of Primera B Nacional. He netted three times, versus ex-club Quilmes, All Boys and Instituto, across seven appearances for them.

=== San Martín, Melgar and Universitario ===
In late January 2021, Pérez Guedes agreed a move to Peruvian football with Universidad de San Martín, with a contract for one season. He became one of the leaders of a squad with many young players and was named captain in the final stages of the year. The club was relegated to the Liga 2 at the end of the season.

In December 2021, Pérez Guedes was signed by FBC Melgar with a contract for one season, where he would play the 2022 Copa Sudamericana. The club managed to reach the semifinals in that tournament and the 2022 Liga 1 finals, which they lost to Alianza Lima. Pérez Guedes played all of Melgar's matches throughout the year, 45 of those as a starter, scoring 9 goals. After the end of the season, the team did not offer him a contract renovation, despite Pérez Guedes' intention to remain at Melgar. In November 2022, he bid farewell to the club and its fans in an Instagram post.

On the same day that he made public his departure from Melgar, Universitario de Deportes announced his signing for the 2023 season. Pérez Guedes made his debut for Universitario on matchday 3 of the Torneo Apertura, in a 4–0 victory against Academia Cantolao, where he scored his team's second goal.

== Career statistics ==
As of November 3rd, 2024.

Club statistics
Club	Season	League			Cup		League Cup		Continental		Other		Total	
Club	Season	Division	Apps	Goals	Apps	Goals	Apps	Goals	Apps	Goals	Apps	Goals	Apps	Goals
Racing Club Argentina	2012–13	Argentine Primera División	17	1	0	0	—		2 (Note: Appearance(s) in the Copa Sudamericana)	0	0	0	19	1
Racing Club Argentina	2013–14	Argentine Primera División	0	0	0	0	—		0	0	0	0	0	0
Racing Club Argentina	2014	Argentine Primera División	0	0	0	0	—		—		0	0	0	0
Racing Club Argentina	2015	Argentine Primera División	0	0	0	0	—		0	0	0	0	0	0
Racing Club Argentina	2016	Argentine Primera División	0	0	0	0	—		0	0	0	0	0	0
Racing Club Argentina	2016–17	Argentine Primera División	0	0	0	0	—		0	0	0	0	0	0
Racing Club Argentina	2017–18	Argentine Primera División	0	0	0	0	—		0	0	0	0	0	0
Racing Club Argentina	2018–19	Argentine Primera División	0	0	0	0	—		0	0	0	0	0	0
Racing Club Argentina	Total		17	1	0	0	—		2	0	0	0	19	1
Olimpo (loan) Argentina	2013–14	Argentine Primera División	26	3	0	0	—		—		0	0	26	3
Quilmes (loan) Argentina	2015	Argentine Primera División	16	0	3	3	—		—		0	0	19	3
Temperley (loan) Argentina	2016	Argentine Primera División	9	1	1	0	—		—		0	0	10	1
Olimpo (loan) Argentina	2016–17	Argentine Primera División	15	0	0	0	—		—		0	0	15	0
Mitre (loan) Argentina	2017–18	Primera B Nacional	24	1	1	0	—		—		0	0	25	1
Defensores de Belgrano (loan) Argentina	2018–19	Primera B Nacional	23	3	0	0	—		—		0	0	23	3
Odisha India	2019–20	Super League	18	3	0	0	—		—		0	0	18	3
Gimnasia y Esgrima Argentina	2020	Primera B Nacional	7	3	0	0	—		—		0	0	7	3
Universidad de San Martín Peru	2021	Peruvian Primera División	0	0	0	0	—		—		0	0	0	0
Club Universitario de Deportes Peru	2023-24	Peruvian Primera División	34	3	8	0	—		—		0	0	42	3
Career total			177	18	13	3	—		0	0	2	0	192	21

== Honours ==
=== Club ===
Racing Club de Avellaneda

- 2014 Argentine Primera División

FBC Melgar

- Torneo Apertura 2022

Universitario de Deportes

- Peruvian Primera División: 2023
- Peruvian Primera División: 2024
- Peruvian Primera División: 2025
