= 2020 Indian Super League playoffs =

Tournament details
- Country: India
- Teams: 4

Final positions
- Champions: ATK
- Runners-up: Chennaiyin FC
- Semifinalists: FC Goa; Bengaluru FC

Tournament statistics
- Matches played: 5
- Goals scored: 20 (4 per match)

The 2020 Indian Super League playoffs was sixth playoffs series in the Indian Super League, one of the top Indian professional football leagues. The playoffs began in March 2020 and concluded with the final in March 2020 in Goa.

The top four teams from the 2019–20 ISL regular season had qualified for the playoffs. The semi-finals took place over two legs while the final was a one-off match at the Fatorda Stadium.

== Season table ==
Pos	Team	Pld	W	D	L	GF	GA	GD	Pts	Qualification
1	Goa (L)	18	12	3	3	46	23	+23	39	Qualification for 2021 AFC Champions League group stage and ISL playoffs
2	ATK (Note: Originally, Mohun Bagan, the 2019–20 I-League champions (they were already assured of the title before the league was abandoned due to the COVID-19 pandemic in India), would qualify as India 2 (2021 AFC Cup group stage), and ATK, the 2020 Indian Super League playoffs winners, would qualify as India 3 (2021 AFC Cup qualifying play-offs). However, ATK owners KGSPL ceased their football operation and bought majority stakes in Mohun Bagan FC (India) Private Limited and rebranded Mohun Bagan football team as ATK Mohun Bagan FC from the 2020–21 Indian Super League which qualified as India 2 in 2021 AFC club competition. The All India Football Federation decided that Bengaluru FC, the 2019–20 Indian Super League regular season 3rd place (behind FC Goa, which qualified for the 2021 AFC Champions League, and ATK), will qualify as India 3.) (C)	18	10	4	4	33	16	+17	34	Advance to ISL playoffs
3	Bengaluru	18	8	6	4	22	13	+9	30	Qualification for 2021 AFC Cup play-off round and ISL playoffs
4	Chennaiyin	18	8	5	5	32	26	+6	29	Advance to ISL playoffs
5	Mumbai City	18	7	5	6	25	29	−4	26	
6	Odisha	18	7	4	7	28	31	−3	25	
7	Kerala Blasters	18	4	7	7	29	32	−3	19	
8	Jamshedpur	18	4	6	8	22	35	−13	18	
9	NorthEast United	18	2	8	8	16	30	−14	14	
10	Hyderabad	18	2	4	12	21	39	−18	10	

Source: Indian Super League
Rules for classification: 1) points; 2) head-to-head points; 3) head-to-head goal difference; 4) head-to-head goals scored; 5) goal difference; 5) number of goals scored; 6) fair play ranking; 6) drawing of lots
(C) Champions; (L) League Winners' Shield Winners

== Teams ==
- FC Goa
- ATK
- Bengaluru FC
- Chennaiyin FC

== Playoffs stage ==
=== Bracket ===
Semi-finals
1	Goa	1	4	5
4	Chennaiyin	4	2	6
2	ATK	0	3	3
3	Bengaluru	1	1	2

Final
4	Chennaiyin	1
2	ATK	3

=== Semi-finals ===
Team 1	Agg.	Team 2	1st leg	2nd leg
Chennaiyin	6–5	Goa	4–1	2–4
Bengaluru	2–3	ATK	1–0	1–3

==== Leg 1 ====
29 February 2020
19:30 IST

Chennaiyin	4–1	Goa
Goian 54'; Thapa 61'; Sabiá 77'; Chhangte 79'	Report	Gama 85'

Jawaharlal Nehru Stadium, Chennai
Attendance: 17,915
Referee: Ali Abdulnabi (Bahrain)

1 March 2020
19:30 IST

Bengaluru	1–0	ATK
Brown 31'	Report

Sree Kanteerava Stadium, Bengaluru
Attendance: 20,754
Referee: Muhammad Taqi (Singapore)

==== Leg 2 ====
7 March 2020
19:30 IST

Goa	4–2	Chennaiyin
Goian 11' (o.g.); Fall 21', 83'; Bedia 81'	Report	Chhangte 52'; Valskis 59'

Fatorda Stadium, Margao
Attendance: 18,263
Referee: Ilgiz Tantashev (Uzbekistan)

Chennaiyin won 6–5 on aggregate

8 March 2020
19:30 IST

ATK	3–1	Bengaluru
Krishna 30'; Williams 63' (pen.), 79'	Report	Kuruniyan 5'

Salt Lake Stadium, Kolkata
Attendance: 50,102
Referee: Ali Abdulnabi (Bahrain)

ATK won 3–2 on aggregate

=== Final ===
Owing to COVID-19 pandemic in India the final was played behind closed doors.

14 March 2020
19:30 IST

ATK	3–1	Chennaiyin
Hernández 10', 90+3'; Garcia 48'	Report	Valskis 69'

Fatorda Stadium, Margao
Attendance: 0
Referee: Kasimov Sherzod (Uzbekistan)
