= Manuel Onwu =

Spanish footballer

Personal information
- Full name: Manuel Onwu Villafranca
- Date of birth: 11 January 1988 (age 38)
- Place of birth: Tudela, Spain
- Height: 1.85 m (6 ft 1 in)
- Position: Forward

Youth career
- Valtierrano
- 2002–2006: Tudelano

Senior career*
| Years | Team | Apps | (Gls) |
| 2006–2007 | Tudelano | 5 | (0) |
| 2007–2012 | Osasuna B | 106 | (23) |
| 2007–2008 | → Iruña (loan) | 36 | (19) |
| 2008 | → Alzira (loan) | 4 | (1) |
| 2012–2015 | Osasuna | 31 | (2) |
| 2015 | Dinamo Tbilisi | 10 | (3) |
| 2015–2016 | Lleida Esportiu | 24 | (10) |
| 2016–2018 | Lorca | 41 | (9) |
| 2018–2019 | UCAM Murcia | 45 | (12) |
| 2019–2020 | Bengaluru | 6 | (0) |
| 2020 | → Odisha (loan) | 4 | (7) |
| 2020–2021 | Odisha | 18 | (0) |
| 2021–2022 | Badalona | 13 | (1) |
| Total | | 343 | (87) |
- * Club domestic league appearances and goals

Manuel Onwu Villafranca (born 11 January 1988) is a Spanish former professional footballer who played as a forward.

== Club career ==
Born in Tudela, Navarre to a Nigerian father and a Spanish mother, and raised in neighbouring Valtierra, Onwu started playing with Club Atlético Valtierrano then moved to local CD Tudelano, making his senior debut with the latter in 2006, in Tercera División. The following year, he signed with neighbouring CA Osasuna, being assigned to its B team and going on to serve two loans in the lower leagues subsequently.

Onwu scored 11 goals in 30 matches with the reserves in the Segunda División B in the 2011–12 season. On 11 March 2012, he made his first-team – and La Liga – debut, coming on as a second-half substitute in a 2–1 home win against Athletic Bilbao. He made his first start two rounds later, in a 2–0 away victory over Levante UD (71 minutes played).

In the summer of 2015, after a fleeting spell in the Georgian Erovnuli Liga with FC Dinamo Tbilisi, Onwu returned to his country and its third tier, going on to represent Lleida Esportiu, Lorca FC and UCAM Murcia CF. He achieved promotion with the second club at the end of the 2016–17 campaign by netting eight times, but also dealt with injury and bureaucratic problems.

On 17 July 2019, free agent Onwu signed with Indian Super League defending champions Bengaluru FC. The following 28 January, he was loaned to Odisha FC in the same competition. He scored his first hat-trick as a professional on 23 February, in the 4–4 home draw against Kerala Blasters FC.

Onwu joined Odisha on a permanent one-year contract in September 2020. He retired in 2022 aged 34, following a spell in the Segunda Federación with CF Badalona.
