= Sèrge Kevyn =

Gabonese footballer (born 1994)

Personal information
- Full name: Sèrge Kevyn Aboué Angoué
- Date of birth: 3 August 1994 (age 32)
- Place of birth: Port-Gentil, Gabon
- Height: 1.86 m (6 ft 1 in)
- Position: Forward

Senior career*
Years	Team	Apps	(Gls)
2013–2014	AD Nogueirense	20	(11)
2014–2015	Marítimo B	12	(0)
2015–2016	Vizela	23	(3)
2016–2018	Leiria	20	(9)
2018–2019	Fátima	14	(4)
2019	Al-Ittihad	?	(?)
2019–2020	Mumbai City	10	(1)

International career^{‡}
2014–	Gabon	8	(0)
- * Club domestic league appearances and goals as of 12:22 pm, 24 August 2019 (UTC) ‡ National team caps and goals as of 04:35, 4 October 2020 (UTC)

Sèrge Kevyn Aboué Angoué (born 3 August 1994) is a Gabonese professional footballer who plays as a forward for the Gabon national team.

== Club career ==
Born in Port-Gentil, Kevyn began his career in Portugal with AD Nogueirense before joining Marítimo B. He stayed at the club for a season before signing with fellow Portuguese side Vizela. After another season he signed with Campeonato de Portugal side Leiria. In August 2019, he signed for Mumbai City in the Indian Super League.

== International career ==
Kevyn made his international debut on 5 March 2014 for Gabon in a friendly against Morocco. He came on as a substitute as Gabon drew 1–1.

== Career statistics ==
As of 22 January 2020

Club	Season	League		Domestic Cup		League Cup		Continental		Total	
Club	Season	Apps	Goals	Apps	Goals	Apps	Goals	Apps	Goals	Apps	Goals
AD Nogueirense	2013–14	20	11	0	0	0	0	0	0	20	11
Marítimo B	2014–15	12	0	0	0	0	0	0	0	12	0
Marítimo C	2014–15	4	0	0	0	0	0	0	0	4	0
Vizela	2015–16	23	3	0	0	0	0	0	0	23	3
Leiria	2016–17	15	7	0	0	0	0	0	0	15	7
Leiria	2017–18	5	2	0	0	0	0	0	0	5	2
C.D. Fátima	2017–18	14	4	0	0	0	0	0	0	14	4
Mumbai City FC	2019–20	10	1	0	0	0	0	0	0	10	1
Career total		74	19	0	0	0	0	0	0	74	19
