= Aitor Monroy =

Spanish footballer

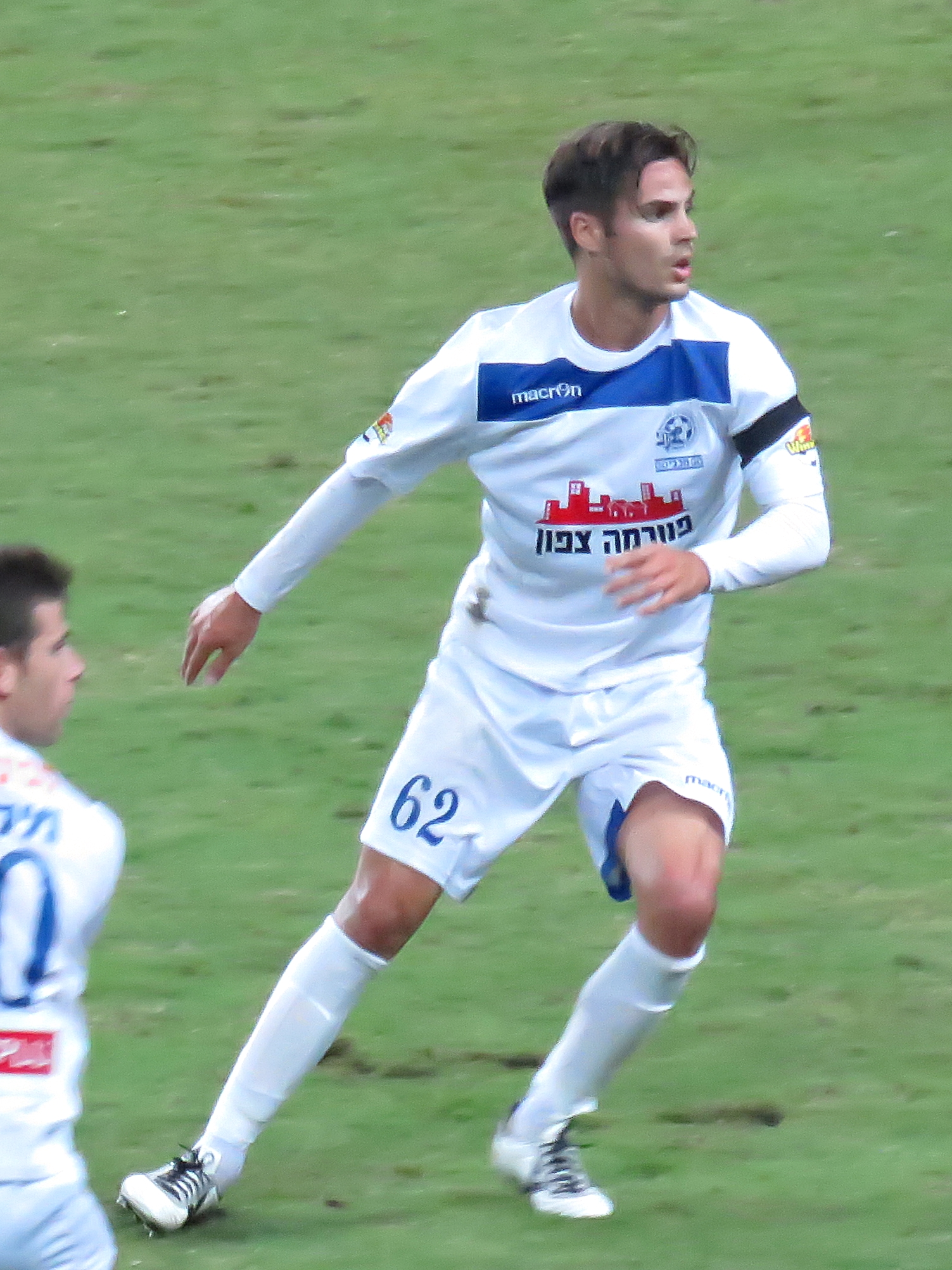
- Monroy with Maccabi Petah Tikva in 2015

Personal information
- Full name: Aitor Monroy Rueda
- Date of birth: 18 October 1987 (age 39)
- Place of birth: Madrid, Spain
- Height: 1.79 m (5 ft 10 in)
- Position: Defensive midfielder

Team information
- Current team: Racing Madrid

Youth career
- 2000–2005: Alcalá

Senior career*
Years	Team	Apps	(Gls)
2005–2007	Atlético Madrid C		
2007–2009	Atlético Madrid B	42	(0)
2009–2011	Logroñés	17	(0)
2011–2014	Ceahlăul	59	(1)
2014	CFR Cluj	27	(0)
2015	Sheriff	11	(0)
2015–2017	Maccabi Petah Tikva	52	(0)
2018	Dinamo București	5	(0)
2018	Dunărea Călărași	4	(0)
2019	Internacional Madrid	17	(0)
2019–2021	Jamshedpur	37	(1)
2022–2024	Alcalá	64	(0)
2024–2025	Azuqueca	32	(1)
2025–	Racing Madrid	6	(0)
- * Club domestic league appearances and goals as of 19:19, 1 April 2026 (UTC)

Aitor Monroy Rueda (born 18 October 1987) is a Spanish professional footballer who plays as a defensive midfielder for Tercera Federación club Racing Madrid.

== Career ==
Born in Madrid, Monroy signed with Atlético Madrid in 2005 from neighbouring club RSD Alcalá. He could only represent the C and B teams over a four-year spell, the latter in the Segunda División B.

From 2009 to 2011, Monroy continued to compete in division three, with UD Logroñés. He was rarely played during his spell, mainly due to injuries.

Monroy's first top-flight experience occurred in 2011–12, with FC Ceahlăul Piatra Neamț in Romania. In the following campaign he appeared in 28 Liga I matches and scored his first goal as a professional, in a 3–0 win against CS Concordia Chiajna.

In January 2014, Monroy transferred to fellow top-flight side CFR Cluj for €40,000. That November, he chose to terminate his contract over unpaid wages, and the following February he signed with Moldovan National Division's FC Sheriff Tiraspol.

After two seasons with Maccabi Petah Tikva F.C. of the Israeli Premier League, Monroy returned to Romania in January 2018, signing for FC Dinamo București. In the following years, he represented in quick succession FC Dunărea Călărași (Romanian top division), Internacional de Madrid (Spanish third tier) and Jamshedpur FC (Indian Super League).

Monroy returned to the Spanish lower leagues and Alcalá in March 2022, aged 34. On 12 September 2024, he joined CD Azuqueca also of Tercera Federación.

== Career statistics ==
As of 1 May 2022

Appearances and goals by club, season and competition
Club	Season	League			Cup		Continental		Total	
Club	Season	Division	Apps	Goals	Apps	Goals	Apps	Goals	Apps	Goals
Atlético Madrid B	2007–08	Segunda División B	13	0	—		—		13	0
Atlético Madrid B	2008–09	Segunda División B	29	0	0	0	—		29	0
Atlético Madrid B	Total		42	0	0	0	0	0	42	0
UD Logroñés	2009–10	Segunda División B	12	0	1	0	—		13	0
UD Logroñés	2010–11	Segunda División B	5	0	1	0	—		6	0
UD Logroñés	Total		17	0	2	0	0	0	19	0
Ceahlăul Piatra Neamț	2011–12	Liga I	31	0	1	0	—		32	0
Ceahlăul Piatra Neamț	2012–13	Liga I	28	1	2	0	—		30	1
Ceahlăul Piatra Neamț	Total		59	1	3	0	0	0	62	1
CFR Cluj	2013–14	Liga I	12	0	0	0	—		12	0
CFR Cluj	2014–15	Liga I	15	0	1	0	4 (Note: Appearances in UEFA Europa League)	0	20	0
CFR Cluj	Total		27	0	1	0	4	0	32	0
Sheriff Tiraspol	2014–15	National Division	11	0	1	0	—		12	0
Maccabi Petah Tikva	2015–16	Israeli Premier League	28	0	6	0	—		34	0
Maccabi Petah Tikva	2016–17	Israeli Premier League	24	0	3	0	—		27	0
Maccabi Petah Tikva	Total		52	0	9	0	0	0	61	0
Dinamo București	2017–18	Liga I	5	0	1	0	—		6	0
Dunărea Călărași	2018–19	Liga I	4	0	0	0	—		4	0
Internacional Madrid	2018–19	Segunda División B	17	0	0	0	—		17	0
Jamshedpur	2019–20	Indian Super League	18	1	0	0	—		18	1
Jamshedpur	2020–21	Indian Super League	19	0	0	0	—		19	0
Jamshedpur	Total		37	1	0	0	0	0	37	1
Alcalá	2021–22	Tercera División RFEF	5	0	—		—		5	0
Career total			276	2	17	0	4	0	297	2
