= Xisco Hernández =

Spanish footballer (born 1989)

Personal information
- Full name: Francisco Hernández Marcos
- Date of birth: 31 July 1989 (age 37)
- Place of birth: Palma, Spain
- Height: 1.77 m (5 ft 9 1/2 in)
- Position: Winger

Youth career
- Mallorca

Senior career*
Years	Team	Apps	(Gls)
2008–2010	Mallorca B	55	(7)
2010	Elche	0	(0)
2010–2011	Puertollano	27	(2)
2011–2012	Mallorca B	30	(4)
2011	Mallorca	0	(0)
2012–2013	Lleida Esportiu	19	(4)
2013–2014	Atlético Baleares	34	(8)
2014–2015	Reus	25	(5)
2015–2016	Gimnàstic	1	(0)
2016	→ Atlético Baleares (loan)	9	(4)
2016– 2018	Atlético Baleares	53	(16)
2018–2019	Bengaluru	20	(1)
2019–2020	Odisha	18	(5)
2021	Bengaluru	1	(0)
- * Club domestic league appearances and goals as of 2 February 2021

Francisco 'Xisco' Hernández Marcos (born 31 July 1989) is a Spanish footballer who last played as a winger for Bengaluru FC in Indian Super League.

== Club career ==
Born in Palma, Majorca, Balearic Islands, Hernández grew in the youth ranks of local giants RCD Mallorca. He made his senior debut with the reserves in the 2008–09 season, in Tercera División.

On 4 July 2010, Hernández signed with Elche CF of Segunda División. A month later, however, he terminated his contract, moving to CD Puertollano in early September.

On 27 July 2011, Hernández returned to Mallorca B, now in Segunda División B. On 14 December he made his maiden appearance with the first team, starting in a 0–1 home loss against Sporting de Gijón for the campaign's Copa del Rey.

In August 2012, Hernández joined Lleida Esportiu. He moved clubs again the following year, signing with CD Atlético Baleares also of the third level.

On 18 July 2014, Hernández signed for CF Reus Deportiu, still in Catalonia and in the third tier. On 26 May of the following year he moved to neighbouring club Gimnàstic de Tarragona which had just been promoted to the second division, with the deal being effective in July.

On 13 January 2016, after being rarely used, Hernández returned to Atlético Baleares on loan until June. On 4 April, he terminated his contract with Nàstic.

On 6 July 2018, 29-year-old Hernández moved abroad for the first time in his career and joined Indian Super League franchise Bengaluru FC on a one-year contract. In June 2019, he signed a one-year deal with Odisha FC in the same competition.

== Career statistics ==
As of match played on 14 September 2020

Club	Season	League			Cup		Other		Total	
Club	Season	Division	Apps	Goals	Apps	Goals	Apps	Goals	Apps	Goals
Mallorca B	2009–10	Segunda División B	33	4	—		—		33	4
Puertollano	2010–11	Segunda División B	27	2	0	0	—		27	2
Mallorca B	2011–12	Segunda División B	30	4	—		—		30	4
Mallorca	2011–12	La Liga	0	0	1	0	—		1	0
Lleida Esportiu	2012–13	Segunda División B	19	4	1	0	3 (Note: Appearances in Promotion Play-offs)	0	23	4
Atlético Baleares	2013–14	Segunda División B	34	8	0	0	—		34	8
Reus	2014–15	Segunda División B	25	5	0	0	—		25	5
Gimnàstic	2015–16	Segunda División	1	0	2	0	—		3	0
Atlético Baleares (loan)	2015–16	Segunda División B	9	4	0	0	—		9	4
Atlético Baleares	2016–17	Segunda División B	32	12	0	0	4	1	36	13
Atlético Baleares	2017–18	Segunda División B	21	4	1	0	—		22	4
Atlético Baleares	Total		53	16	1	0	4	1	57	17
Bengaluru	2018–19	Indian Super League	20	1	0	0	2 (Note: Appearances in AFC Cup)	0	22	1
Odisha	2019–20	Indian Super League	18	5	0	0	0	0	18	5
Career total			269	53	5	0	9	1	283	54

== Honours ==
Bengaluru

- Indian Super League: 2018–19
