= List of Odisha FC players =

Odisha FC is an Indian professional association football club based in Bhubaneswar, Odisha that competes in the Indian Super League. The club was established on 16-July-2014, as Delhi Dynamos FC, before relocating to Odisha in 2019.

== Players ==
The list includes year-wise list of all the players registered under an Odisha FC contract. Some players might not have featured in a professional game for the club.

=== 2014 ===
Player	Nationality	Position	Term	Appearances	Goals	Assists
Adil Khan (footballer, born 1988)	India	Midfielder	2014–2015	7	0	0
Alessandro Del Piero	Italy	Midfielder/Forward	2014–2015	10	1	1
Anwar Ali (footballer)	India	Defender	2014–2015	17	0	0
Bruno Herrero	Spain	Midfielder	2014–2015	10	1	1
Francis Fernandes	India	Midfielder	2014–2016	16	0	3
Govin Singh	India	Defender	2014–2015	1	0	0
Gustavo Marmentini	Brazil	Midfielder	2014–2017	29	8	3
Hans Mulder	Netherlands	Midfielder	2014–2016	28	3	0
Henrique Dinis	Portugal	Midfielder	2014–2015	6	0	0
Jagroop Singh	India	Goalkeeper	2014–2015	0	0	0
Mads Junker	Denmark	Forward	2014–2015	14	3	0
Manandeep Singh	India	Forward	2014–2015	2	0	1
Manish Bhargav	India	Midfielder	2014–2015	3	1	0
Marek Čech	Czech Republic	Goalkeeper	2014–2015	0	0	0
Morten Skoubo	Denmark	Forward	2014–2015	8	0	0
Munmun Lugun	India	Defender	2014–2015, 2017–2018	11	0	0
Naoba Singh	India	Defender	2014–2015	6	0	0
Pavel Eliáš	Czech Republic	Midfielder	2014–2015	5	1	0
Robert Lalthlamuana	India	Defender	2014–2016	6	0	0
Shouvik Ghosh	India	Defender	2014–2015	13	0	2
Shylo Malsawmtluanga	India	Midfielder	2014–2015	21	0	1
Souvik Chakrabarti	India	Midfielder	2014–2017	35	0	1
Steven Dias	India	Midfielder	2014–2015	7	0	1
Stijn Houben	Netherlands	Defender	2014–2015	7	0	0
Wim Raymaekers	Belgium	Defender	2014–2015	8	1	0

=== 2015 ===
Player	Nationality	Position	Term	Appearances	Goals	Assists
Adil Nabi	England/Pakistan	Midfielder	2015–2016	11	3	0
Anas Edathodika	India	Defender	2015–2017	25	1	0
Chicão	Brazil	Defender	2015–2016	12	1	1
Florent Malouda	France	Midfielder	2015–2017	32	3	11
Gustavo Godinez Vasqùez	Brazil	Midfielder	2015	0	0	0
Gunashekar Vignesh	India	Midfielder	2015–2016	0	0	0
John Arne Riise	Norway	Defender	2015–2016	15	1	1
Prabir Das	India	Defender	2015–2016	0	0	0
Ravi Kumar (footballer, born 1993)	India	Goalkeeper	2015–2016, 2020–2022	2	0	0
Richard Gadze	Ghana	Forward	2015–2017	28	9	7
Roberto Carlos	Brazil	Defender	2015–2016	3	0	0
Robin Singh	India	Forward	2015–2016	13	4	0
Sanjiban Ghosh	India	Goalkeeper	2015–2017	3	0	0
Sehnaj Singh	India	Midfielder	2015–2016	10	1	0
Seityasen Singh	India	Forward	2015–2016	12	1	3
Serginho Greene	Netherlands	Defender	2015–2016	4	1	0
Stefano Monteleone	Italy	Forward	2015	0	0	0
Subhasish Roy Chowdhury	India	Goalkeeper	2015–2016	1	0	0
Toni Doblas	Spain	Goalkeeper	2015–2017	24	0	1
Vinícius Ferreira	Brazil	Forward	2015–2016	11	0	1
Zodingliana Ralte	India	Midfielder	2015–2016	12	0	1

=== 2016 ===
Player	Nationality	Position	Term	Appearances	Goals	Assists
Alwyn George	India	Midfielder	2016–2017	3	0	0
Amoes Do	India	Defender	2016–2017	0	0	0
Arjun Tudu	India	Forward	2016–2017	0	0	0
Badara Badji	Senegal	Midfielder	2016–2017	12	2	1
Bruno Pelissari	Brazil	Midfielder	2016–2017	11	0	0
Chinglensana Singh	India	Defender	2016–2017	12	0	0
David Addy	Ghana	Defender	2016–2017	6	0	2
Denson Devadas	India	Defender	2016–2017	0	0	0
Ibrahima Niasse	Senegal	Defender	2016–2017	5	0	0
Kean Lewis	India	Midfielder	2016–2017	14	4	3
Lalruatthara	India	Defender	2016–2017, 2021–2022	17	0	0
Marcelinho	Brazil	Midfielder/Forward	2016–2017, 2020–2021	23	10	4
Malsawmzuala	India	Midfielder	2016–2017	4	1	0
Memo (footballer, born 1988)	Brazil	Midfielder	2016–2017	10	0	1
Milan Singh	India	Midfielder	2016–2017	15	2	0
Rupert Nongrum	India	Defender	2016–2017	5	0	0
Rubén González	Spain	Defender	2016–2017	13	1	0
Soram Anganba	India	Goalkeeper	2016–2017	5	0	0

=== 2017 ===
Player	Nationality	Position	Term	Appearances	Goals	Assists
Albino Gomes	India	Goalkeeper	2017–2020	11	0	0
Arnab Das Sharma	India	Goalkeeper	2017–2018	9	0	0
David Ngaihte	India	Midfielder	2017–2018	11	1	1
Edu Moya	Spain	Defender	2017–2018	11	0	0
Gabriel Cichero	Venezuela	Defender	2017–2018	15	0	0
Guyon Fernandez	Netherlands/Curaçao	Forward	2017–2018	10	2	0
Jeroen Lumu	Netherlands	Forward	2017–2018	17	0	0
Kalu Uche	Nigeria	Forward	2017–2018	16	14	2
Lallianzuala Chhangte	India	Forward	2017–2019	40	8	4
Manuel Arana	Spain	Midfielder	2017–2018	6	1	1
Matías Mirabaje	Uruguay	Midfielder	2017–2018	13	3	1
Mohammad Sajid Dhot	India	Defender	2017–2021	25	1	0
Nandhakumar Sekar	India	Forward/Midfielder	2017–2023, 2026–present	97	16	14
Paulinho Dias	Brazil	Midfielder	2017–2018	16	1	0
Pritam Kotal	India	Defender	2017–2018	25	2	3
Pratik Chaudhari	India	Defender	2017–2018	11	0	0
Romeo Fernandes	India	Midfielder	2017–2020	28	1	3
Rowilson Rodrigues	India	Defender	2017–2018	8	0	0
Seityasen Singh	India	Midfielder	2017–2018	12	1	3
Sena Ralte	India	Defender	2017–2018	6	0	0
Shubham Sarangi	India	Defender	2017–2023	54	0	1
Simranjit Singh	India	Midfielder	2017–2018	1	0	0
Sukhdev Patil	India	Goalkeeper	2017–2018	2	0	0
Vinit Rai	India	Midfielder	2017–2023	70	1	0
Xabi Irureta	Spain	Goalkeeper	2017–2018	8	0	0

=== 2018 ===
Player	Nationality	Position	Term	Appearances	Goals	Assists
Adrià Carmona	Spain	Midfielder	2018–2019	15	1	2
Andrija Kaluđerović	Serbia	Forward	2018–2019	12	1	0
Bikramjit Singh	India	Midfielder	2018–2020	18	2	0
Francisco Dorronsoro	Spain	Goalkeeper	2018–2020	25	0	0
Gianni Zuiverloon	Netherlands	Defender	2018–2019	20	2	0
Marcos Tébar	Spain	Midfielder	2018–2020	44	1	5
Martí Crespí	Spain	Defender	2018–2019	18	0	0
Narayan Das	India	Defender	2018–2020	38	0	2
Pradeep Mohanraj	India	Midfielder	2018–2019	0	0	0
Rana Gharami	India	Defender	2018–2020	20	1	1
René Mihelič	Slovenia	Midfielder	2018–2019	17	1	2
Seiminmang Manchong	India	Forward	2018–2020	6	0	0
Siam Hanghal	India	Midfielder	2018–2019	0	0	0
Ulises Dávila	Mexico	Midfielder	2018–2019	8	1	2

=== 2019 ===
Player	Nationality	Position	Term	Appearances	Goals	Assists
Amit Tudu	India	Defender	2019–2020	0	0	0
Ankit Bhuyan	India	Goalkeeper	2019–2022	0	0	0
Aridane Santana	Spain	Forward	2019–2020	14	9	2
Arshdeep Singh	India	Goalkeeper	2019–2022	33	0	0
Carlos Delgado	Spain	Defender	2019–2020, 2022–2025, 2026–present	114	4	2
Diawandou Diagne	Senegal	Defender	2019–2020	10	0	1
Gaurav Bora	India	Defender	2019–2022	41	0	0
Jerry Mawihmingthanga	India	Midfielder	2019–2025	130	20	19
Lalchhuanmawia	India	Defender	2019–2020	3	0	0
Lalhrezuala Sailung	India	Midfielder	2019–2023	11	1	0
Manuel Onwu	Spain	Forward	2019–2022	22	7	4
Martín Pérez Guedes	Argentina	Midfielder	2019–2020	18	3	2
Van Lal Remtluanga Chhangte	India	Midfielder	2019–2020	0	0	0
Xisco Hernández	Spain	Midfielder	2019–2020	18	5	2

=== 2020 ===
Player	Nationality	Position	Term	Appearances	Goals	Assists
Akshunna Tyagi	India	Forward	2020–2024	5	0	0
Baoringdao Bodo	India	Midfielder/Forward	2020–2022	1	0	0
Cole Alexander	South Africa	Midfielder	2020–2021	15	3	1
George D'Souza	India	Defender	2020–2022	2	0	0
Hendry Antonay	India	Defender	2020–2022	23	0	1
Isak Vanlalruatfela	India	Midfielder	2020–2026	94	14	12
Jacob Tratt	Australia	Defender	2020–2021	17	0	1
Jones Lalthakima	India	Defender	2020–2022	0	0	0
Kamaljit Singh	India	Goalkeeper	2020–2022	15	0	1
Kamalpreet Singh	India	Defender	2020–2022	4	0	0
Laishram Premjit Singh	India	Midfielder	2020–2022	4	0	0
Marcelinho	Brazil	Midfielder/Forward	2016–2017, 2020–2021	23	10	4
Nischay Adhikari	India	Midfielder	2020–2021	0	0	0
Paul Ramfangzauva	India	Midfielder	2020–2023	27	3	1
Rishabh Dobriyal	India	Forward	2020–2021, 2022–2023	0	0	0
Ronaldo Wairokpam	India	Defender	2020–2022	0	0	0
Samuel Lalmuanpuia	India	Midfielder	2020–2022	3	0	0
Saurabh Meher	India	Defender	2020–2022	3	0	0
Steven Taylor	England	Defender	2020–2021	17	2	0
Thoiba Singh Moirangthem	India	Defender/Midfielder	2020–present	97	2	5

=== 2021 ===
Player	Nationality	Position	Term	Appearances	Goals	Assists
Aridai Cabrera	Spain	Forward	2021–2022	17	5	1
Brad Inman	Australia	Midfielder	2021	6	1	2
Deven Sawhney	India	Defender	2021–2025	1	0	0
Héctor Rodas	Spain	Defender	2021–2022	15	2	0
Isaac Vanmalsawma	India	Midfielder	2021–2023	44	2	3
Javi Hernández (footballer, born 1989)	Spain	Midfielder	2021–2022	19	6	6
Lalruatthara	India	Defender	2016–2017, 2021–2022	17	0	0
Liridon Krasniqi	Malaysia/Kosovo	Midfielder	2021–2022	16	0	0
Nikhil Prabhu	India	Midfielder	2021–2023	7	0	0
Nikhil Raj	India	Midfielder	2021–2022	6	1	0
Rakesh Pradhan	India	Defender	2021–2022	8	0	1
Sahil Panwar	India	Defender	2021–2024	45	1	3
Sebastian Thangmuansang	India	Defender	2021–2022	6	0	0
Víctor Mongil	Spain	Defender	2021–2022	19	0	0

=== 2022 ===
Player	Nationality	Position	Term	Appearances	Goals	Assists
Amrinder Singh	India	Goalkeeper	2022–present	91	0	1
Antonio D'Silva	India	Goalkeeper	2022	0	0	0
Denechandra Meitei	India	Defender	2022–2023	19	0	1
Karan Amin	India	Defender	2022–2023	1	0	0
Lalthuammawia Ralte	India	Goalkeeper	2022–2024	10	0	1
Michael Soosairaj	India	Forward	2022–2024	7	0	0
Narender Gahlot	India	Defender	2022–present	51	0	0
Niraj Kumar	India	Goalkeeper	2022–2025	0	0	0
Osama Malik	Australia	Midfielder	2022–2023	23	0	1
Pedro Martín	Spain	Forward	2022–2023	26	4	1
Princeton Rebello	India	Midfielder	2022–2024	35	1	1
Raynier Fernandes	India	Midfielder	2022–2024	43	0	4
Redeem Tlang	India	Forward	2022	8	1	1
Saúl Crespo	Spain	Midfielder	2022–2023	26	3	2
Víctor Rodríguez	Spain	Midfielder/Forward	2022–2023	20	3	4

=== 2023 ===
Player	Nationality	Position	Term	Appearances	Goals	Assists
Ahmed Jahouh	Morocco	Midfielder	2023–2025	51	6	16
Amey Ranawade	India	Defender	2023–2024	59	2	6
Aniket Jadhav	India	Forward	2023–2024	36	1	0
Ashangbam Aphaoba Singh	India	Forward	2023–present	11	0	0
Cy Goddard	Japan/England	Midfielder/Forward	2023–2024	26	1	2
Diego Maurício	Brazil	Forward	2022–2025	110	57	19
Givson Singh	India	Midfielder	2023–2025	1	0	0
Jerry Lalrinzuala	India	Defender	2023–present	55	1	2
Laldinliana Renthlei	India	Defender	2023–2024, 2026–present	6	0	1
Lalliansanga Renthlei	India	Midfielder	2023–2024	0	0	0
Lenny Rodrigues	India	Midfielder	2023–2024	34	0	0
Mourtada Fall	Senegal	Defender	2023–2025	53	13	1
Paogoumang Singson	India	Defender	2023–2024	0	0	0
Pranjal Bhumij	India	Forward	2023–2024	13	0	0
Pungte Lapung	India	Midfielder	2023–2024	0	0	0
Roy Krishna	Fiji/New Zealand	Forward	2023–2025	47	18	6

=== 2024 ===
Player	Nationality	Position	Term	Appearances	Goals	Assists
Anuj Kumar	India	Goalkeeper	2024–present	4	0	0
Dorielton Gomes	Brazil	Forward	2024–2025	11	3	1
Hitesh Sharma	India	Midfielder	2024–present	12	0	1
Hugo Boumous	Morocco/France	Midfielder	2024–2026	22	6	7
Jeremy Zohminghlua	India	Defender	2024–present	3	0	0
Manas Dubey	India	Goalkeeper	2024–present	1	0	0
Narendra Naik	India	Midfielder	2024–present	3	0	0
Rahim Ali	India	Forward	2024–present	35	5	2
Rohit Kumar	India	Midfielder	2024–present	28	0	0
Saviour Gama	India	Defender	2024–present	24	0	1
Subham Bhattacharya	India	Defender	2024–present	10	1	0
Vignesh Dakshinamurthy	India	Defender	2024	0	0	0

=== 2025 ===
Player	Nationality	Position	Term	Appearances	Goals	Assists
Edwin Sydney Vanspaul	India	Defender/Midfielder	2025–present	12	0	1
Heikrujam Sanathoi Singh	India	Forward	2025–present	5	0	1
K. Lalrinfela	India	Midfielder	2025–present	11	1	3
Kartik Hantal	India	Forward	2025–present	9	1	0
Rahul KP	India	Forward	2025–2026	17	3	1
Raj Kumar Sanyasi	India	Defender	2025–2026	2	0	0
Saurabh Bhanwala	India	Defender	2025–present	3	0	0
Tejas Krishna	India	Defender	2025–present	2	0	0
V. P. Suhair	India	Forward	2025–present	13	4	0
Vanlalzuidika Chhakchhuak	India	Defender	2025–present	13	0	1

=== 2026 ===
Player	Nationality	Position	Term	Appearances	Goals	Assists
Aashir Salim Vazhappilli	India	Midfielder	2026–present	0	0	0
Arjun M. M.	India	Midfielder	2026–present	0	0	0
Everton Nascimento	Brazil	Forward	2026–present	0	0	0
Giorgi Aburjania	Georgia	Midfielder	2026–present	0	0	0
Imran Khan (footballer)	India	Midfielder/Forward	2026–present	0	0	0
Manu Molina	Spain	Midfielder	2026–present	0	0	0
Nihal Sudeesh	India	Forward	2026–present	0	0	0
Ritwik Das	India	Midfielder/Forward	2026–present	0	0	0
Sachin Suresh	India	Goalkeeper	2026–present	0	0	0
Stephen Eze	Nigeria	Defender	2026–present	0	0	0
