= 2020–21 Odisha FC season =

2020–21 season of Odisha FC

Odisha FC
2020–21 season
- President: Raj Athwal
- Manager: Stuart Baxter
- Stadium: GMC Stadium, Bambolim
- Indian Super League: 11th
- Top goalscorer: League: Diego Maurício (12); All: Diego Maurício (12)
Home colours	Away colours	Third colours
- All statistics correct as of 27 February 2021.

The 2020–21 season was Odisha FC's second season as a club since its establishment in 2019.

== Colours ==
Home	Away	Third

== Squad ==
=== First-team Squad ===
As of 27 February 2021

No.	Name	Nationality	Position	Date of birth (age)
Goalkeepers
1	Arshdeep Singh	(India)	GK	6 October 1997 (age 28)
21	Kamaljit Singh	(India)	GK	28 December 1995 (age 30)
23	Ravi Kumar	(India)	GK	4 July 1993 (age 33)
30	Ankit Bhuyan	(India)	GK	13 July 2001 (age 25)
Defenders
3	Mohammad Sajid Dhot	(India)	DF	14 December 1994 (age 31)
5	Hendry Antonay	(India)	DF	22 May 2000 (age 26)
12	Saurabh Meher	(India)	DF	12 January 2000 (age 26)
13	Gaurav Bora	(India)	DF	13 July 1998 (age 28)
15	Shubham Sarangi	(India)	DF	24 June 2000 (age 26)
18	Jacob Tratt	(Australia)	DF	14 September 1994 (age 31)
26	Kamalpreet Singh	(India)	DF	15 November 1997 (age 28)
27	Steven Taylor (Captain)	(England)	DF	23 January 1986 (age 40)
32	George D'Souza	(India)	DF	30 April 1994 (age 32)
66	Rakesh Pradhan	(India)	DF	2 August 1993 (age 33)
Midfielders
2	Thoiba Singh Moirangthem	(India)	MF	12 December 2002 (age 23)
4	Lalhrezuala Sailung	(India)	MF	17 March 2001 (age 25)
6	Cole Alexander	(South Africa)	MF	9 July 1989 (age 37)
7	Brad Inman	(Australia)	MF	10 December 1991 (age 34)
8	Paul Ramfangzauva	(India)	MF	26 March 1999 (age 27)
9	Samuel Lalmuanpuia	(India)	MF	27 July 1998 (age 28)
16	Vinit Rai	(India)	MF	10 October 1997 (age 28)
17	Jerry Mawihmingthanga	(India)	MF	9 March 1997 (age 29)
19	Isak Vanlalruatfela	(India)	MF	19 May 2001 (age 25)
22	Nanda Kumar	(India)	MF	20 December 1995 (age 30)
28	Laishram Premjit Singh	(India)	MF	1 February 2002 (age 24)
33	Baoringdao Bodo	(India)	MF	17 October 1999 (age 26)
Forwards
10	Marcelinho Leite Pereira	(Brazil)	FW	22 June 1987 (age 39)
11	Diego Maurício	(Brazil)	FW	25 June 1991 (age 35)
14	Daniel Lalhlimpuia	(India)	FW	12 September 1997 (age 28)
24	Manuel Onwu	(Spain)	FW	11 January 1988 (age 38)

=== Transfers ===
==== In ====
No.	Pos.	Name	Previous Team	Date	Ref
9	MF	(India) Samuel Lalmuanpuia	Kerala Blasters	22 May 2020	
32	DF	(India) George D'Souza	Sporting Clube de Goa	3 June 2020	
5	DF	(India) Hendry Antonay	Indian Arrows	5 June 2020	
12	DF	(India) Saurabh Meher	Indian Arrows	5 June 2020	
21	GK	(India) Kamaljit Singh	Hyderabad	9 June 2020	
33	FW	(India) Baoringdao Bodo	Kerala Blasters	11 June 2020	
28	FW	(India) Laishram Premjit Singh	TRAU	11 June 2020	
26	DF	(India) Kamalpreet Singh	East Bengal	13 June 2020	
2	MF	(India) Thoiba Singh Moirangthem	Minerva Punjab	16 June 2020	
19	MF	(India) Isak Vanlalruatfela	Aizawl	24 June 2020	
8	MF	(India) Paul Ramfangzauva	Aizawl	24 June 2020	
23	GK	(India) Ravi Kumar	Mumbai City	29 June 2020	
—	DF	(India) Jones Lalthakima	Odisha FC Reserves and Academy	29 July 2020	
—	DF	(India) Ronaldo Wairokpam	Odisha FC Reserves and Academy	29 July 2020	
—	MF	(India) Nischay Adhikari	Odisha FC Reserves and Academy	29 July 2020	
—	FW	(India) Rishab Dobriyal	Odisha FC Reserves and Academy	29 July 2020	
—	FW	(India) Akshunna Tyagi	Odisha FC Reserves and Academy	29 July 2020	
11	FW	(Brazil) Diego Maurício	(Brazil) Centro Sportivo Alagoano	31 August 2020	
10	FW	(Brazil) Marcelinho Leite Pereira	Hyderabad	2 September 2020	
18	DF	(Australia) Jacob Tratt	(Australia) Perth Glory	11 September 2020	
24	FW	(Spain) Manuel Onwu	Bengaluru	13 September 2020	
27	DF	(England) Steven Taylor	(New Zealand) Wellington Phoenix	16 September 2020	
6	MF	(South Africa) Cole Alexander	(South Africa) Bidvest Wits	10 October 2020	
66	DF	(India) Rakesh Pradhan	(India) NorthEast United	18 January 2021	
7	MF	(Australia) Brad Inman	(India) ATK Mohun Bagan	29 January 2021	

==== Out ====
No.	Pos.	Name	Team	Remarks
6	MF	(India) Bikramjit Singh	Punjab	Free transfer
8	MF	(Spain) Marcos Tébar	—	Free transfer
9	FW	(Spain) Aridane Santana	(Spain) Cultural Leonesa	Loan return
10	MF	(Spain) Xisco Hernández	—	Free transfer
11	MF	(Argentina) Martín Pérez Guedes	(Argentina) Gimnasia y Esgrima de Jujuy	Free transfer
13	GK	(Spain) Francisco Dorronsoro	(Spain) CF Badalona	Free transfer
19	MF	(India) Romeo Fernandes	—	Free transfer
21	DF	(India) Narayan Das	East Bengal	Free transfer
23	DF	(Spain) Carlos Delgado	(Spain) CD Castellón	Loan return
26	DF	(India) Rana Gharami	Bengaluru United	Free transfer
27	DF	(India) Lalchhuanmawia	Chennaiyin	Free transfer
33	DF	(India) Amit Tudu	TRAU	Free transfer
41	FW	(India) Seiminmang Manchong	TRAU	Free transfer
10	FW	(Brazil) Marcelinho Leite Pereira	ATK Mohun Bagan	Loan return

== Pre-season ==
Win Draw Loss Fixtures

10 November 2020 Friendly	Mumbai City (India)	3–2	(India) Odisha	Nagoa, Goa, India
	Ogbeche; Borges; Antonay (o.g.)		Marcelinho; Nandha	Stadium: Village Panchayat Ground

15 November 2020 Friendly	Chennaiyin (India)	2–1	(India) Odisha	Utorda, Goa, India
	Rahim; Thapa		Marcelinho	Stadium: Utorda Football Ground

== Competitions ==
=== League table ===
Pos	Team	Pld	W	D	L	GF	GA	GD	Pts
7	Bengaluru	20	5	7	8	26	28	−2	22
8	Chennaiyin	20	3	11	6	17	23	−6	20
9	East Bengal	20	3	8	9	22	33	−11	17
10	Kerala Blasters	20	3	8	9	23	36	−13	17
11	Odisha	20	2	6	12	25	44	−19	12

Source: Indian Super League
Rules for classification: 1) points; 2) head-to-head points; 3) head-to-head goal difference; 4) head-to-head goals scored; 5) goal difference; 6) number of goals scored; 7) fair play ranking; 8) drawing of lots

==== Matches ====
23 November 2020 1	Odisha	0–1	Hyderabad	Bambolim
19:30 IST	Taylor (yellow card) 34'; Bora (yellow card) 60'; Antonay (yellow card) 70'; Meher (yellow card) 79'; Sarangi (yellow card) 82'	Report	35' (pen.) Santana (yellow card) 84'	Stadium: GMC Athletic Stadium; Attendance: 0 (Note: Match was played behind closed doors due to government restrictions regarding the COVID-19 pandemic in India.); Referee: Tejas Nagvenkar; Man of the Match: Aridane Santana (Hyderabad)

29 November 2020 2	Jamshedpur	2–2	Odisha	Vasco da Gama
17:00 IST	Nerijus Valskis 12' (pen.), 27'; Rehenesh TP (red card) 60'	Report	(yellow card) 11' Bora; (yellow card) 49' Alexander; 77' Diego Maurício; (yellow card) 89' Jacob Tratt; (yellow card) 90' Nanda Kumar; 90' Diego Maurício	Stadium: Tilak Maidan Stadium; Attendance: 0 Referee: Pratik Mondal; Man of the Match: Diego Maurício (Odisha)

3 December 2020 3	ATK Mohun Bagan	1–0	Odisha	Margao
19:30 IST	Tiri (footballer) (yellow card) 8'; Roy Krishna 90+5'	Report	(yellow card) 82' Sarangi; (yellow card) 50' Antonay	Stadium: Fatorda Stadium; Attendance: 0 Referee: L. Ajit Kumar Meetei; Man of the Match: Roy Krishna (ATK Mohun Bagan)

6 December 2020 4	Mumbai City	2–0	Odisha	Bambolim
18:30 IST	Ogbeche 30' (pen.); Borges 45'; Dakshinamurthy (yellow card) 66'; Le Fondre (yellow card) 86'	Report	Tratt (yellow card) 69'; Meher (yellow card) 75'; Taylor (yellow card) 90'	Stadium: GMC Athletic Stadium; Attendance: 0 Referee: Ranjit Baksi; Man of the Match: Rowllin Borges (Mumbai City)

12 December 2020 5	Odisha	0–1	Goa	Bambolim
19:30 IST	Tratt (yellow card) 30'; Antonay (yellow card) 70'	Report	Rodrigues (yellow card) 7'; Angulo 45'; Fernandes (yellow card) 80'	Stadium: GMC Stadium; Attendance: 0 Referee: Pratik Mondal; Man of the Match: Jorge Ortiz

17 December 2020 6	Odisha	1–2	Bengaluru	Bambolim
19:30 IST	Taylor 71'; Bora (yellow card) 80'	Report	(yellow card) 30' Paartalu; 38' Chhetri; 79' Silva; (yellow card) 84' Chaudhari; (yellow card) 90' Khabra	Stadium: GMC Athletic Stadium; Attendance: 0 Referee: Santosh Kumar; Man of the Match: Cleiton Silva (Bengaluru)

22 December 2020 7	Odisha	2–2	NorthEast United	Bambolim
19:30 IST	(yellow card) 19' Maurício; 23' Maurício; (yellow card) 32' Onwu; (yellow card) 42' Vinit; (yellow card) 65' Arshdeep; 67' Cole	Report	(yellow card) 17' Fox; 45' Lambot; (yellow card) 55' Gurjinder; 65' (pen.) Appiah; (yellow card) 84' Ninthoi	Stadium: GMC Athletic Stadium; Attendance: 0 Referee: Pratik Mondal; Man of the Match: Cole Alexander (Odisha)

3 January 2021 8	East Bengal	3–1	Odisha	Vasco da Gama
17:00 IST	Milan (yellow card) 3', Pilkington 13'; Maghoma 39'; Enobakhare 88'	Report	90' (o.g.) Fox; (yellow card) 82' Sarangi	Stadium: Tilak Maidan Stadium; Attendance: 0 Referee: Crystal John; Man of the Match: Anthony Pilkington (East Bengal)

7 January 2021 9	Kerala Blasters	2–4	Odisha	Bambolim
19:30 IST	Murray 7'; Gómez (yellow card) 63'; Hooper 79'	Report	22' (o.g.) Jeakson; 42' Taylor; 50', 60' Maurício	Stadium: GMC Athletic Stadium; Attendance: 0 Referee: Pratik Mondal; Man of the Match: Diego Maurício (Odisha)

10 January 2021 10	Chennaiyin	0–0	Odisha	Bambolim
17:00 IST	Sipović (yellow card) 24'; Lalrinzuala (yellow card) 41'	Report	(yellow card) 83' Tratt	Stadium: GMC Athletic Stadium; Attendance: 0 Referee: Crystal John; Man of the Match: Lallianzuala Chhangte (Chennaiyin)

13 January 2021 11	Odisha	1–2	Chennaiyin	Bambolim
19:30 IST	Sarangi (yellow card) 48'; Maurício 64'; Taylor (yellow card) 90'; Alexander (yellow card) 90+1'	Report	15', 35' (pen.) Gonçalves; (yellow card) 57' Lalrinzuala; (yellow card) 71' Ali; (yellow card) 79' Singh; (yellow card) 88' Sipović	Stadium: GMC Athletic Stadium; Attendance: 0 Referee: Ranjit Baksi; Man of the Match: Anirudh Thapa (Chennaiyin)

19 January 2021 12	Hyderabad	1–1	Odisha	Margao
19:30 IST	Alexander 51'; Dhot (yellow card) 88'; Onwu (yellow card) 56'; Rai (yellow card) 82'; Alexander (yellow card) 90'	Report	13' Narzary	Stadium: Fatorda Stadium; Attendance: 0 Referee: Santosh Kumar; Man of the Match: Cole Alexander (Odisha)

24 January 2021 13	Bengaluru	1–1	Odisha	Margao
19:30 IST	Paartalu 82'	Report	8' Maurício; (yellow card) 47' Rai; (yellow card) 29' Tratt; (yellow card) 79' Onwu; (yellow card) 90' Alexander	Stadium: Fatorda Stadium; Attendance: 0 Referee: Tejas Nagvenkar; Man of the Match: Cleiton Silva (Bengaluru)

1 February 2021 14	Odisha	0–1	Jamshedpur	Bambolim
19:30 IST	Taylor (yellow card) 45+3'	Report	Rahman 40'	Stadium: GMC Athletic Stadium; Attendance: 0 Referee: Santosh Kumar; Man of the Match: Seiminlen Doungel (Jamshedpur)

6 February 2021 15	Odisha	1–4	ATK Mohun Bagan	Bambolim, Goa
19:30 IST	Tratt (yellow card) 2'; Bora (yellow card) 41'; Alexander 45+1'; Onwu (yellow card) 58'; Alexander (yellow card) 85'	Report	Singh 11', 54'; Halder (yellow card) 64'; Bose (yellow card) 80'; Krishna 83' (pen.), 86'; Kotal (yellow card) 90'	Stadium: GMC Athletic Stadium; Attendance: 0 Referee: Tejas Nagvenkar; Man of the Match: Manvir Singh (ATK Mohun Bagan)

11 February 2021 16	Odisha	2–2	Kerala Blasters	Bambolim
19:30 IST	Jordan Murray 52'; Hooper 68'	Report	Maurício 45', 74'	Stadium: GMC Athletic Stadium; Attendance: 0 Referee: Tejas Nagvenkar; Man of the Match: Diego Maurício (Odisha)

14 February 2021 17	NorthEast United	3–1	Odisha	Vasco da Gama
17:00 IST	Machado 9', 24'; Brown 19'; Kumar (yellow card) 71' (yellow-red card) 85'	Report	Bora (yellow card) 7'; Tratt (yellow card) 16'; Dhot (yellow card) 30'; Inman 45+1'; Mawihmingthanga (yellow card) 85'; Maurício (yellow card) 90+1'	Stadium: Tilak Maidan Stadium; Attendance: 0 Referee: Pranjal Banerjee; Man of the Match: Federico Gallego (NorthEast United)

17 February 2021 18	Goa	3–1	Odisha	Margao
19:30 IST	Noguera 18'; Ortiz 26'; González 75'	Report	Maurício 30'	Stadium: Fatorda Stadium; Attendance: 0 Referee: Ranjit Baksi; Man of the Match: Iván Garrido González (Goa)

24 February 2021 19	Odisha	1–6	Mumbai City	Bambolim, Goa
19:30 IST	Maurício 9' (pen.)	Report	Ogbeche 14', 43'; Bipin 38', 47', 86'; Goddard 44'	Stadium: GMC Athletic Stadium; Attendance: 0 Referee: Tejas Nagvenkar; Man of the Match: Bipin Singh (Mumbai City)

27 February 2021 20	Odisha	6–5	East Bengal	Bambolim, Goa
19:30 IST	Sailung 33'; Ramfangzauva 49' 66'; Jerry 51' (yellow card) 63' (goal) 67'; Rai (yellow card) 57'; Mauricio 69'	Report	Pilkington 24' (yellow card) 45'; Ravi 37' (o.g.); Fox (yellow card) 51'; Holloway 60' 90'; Lalpekhlua 74'	Stadium: GMC Athletic Stadium; Attendance: 0 Referee: Harish Kundu; Man of the Match: Diego Mauricio (Odisha)

==== Results by matchday ====
Matchday	1	2	3	4	5	6	7	8	9	10	11	12	13	14	15	16	17	18	19	20
Ground	H	A	A	A	H	H	H	A	A	A	H	A	A	H	H	H	A	A	H	H
Result	L	D	L	L	L	L	D	L	W	D	L	D	D	L	L	D	L	L	L	W
Position	11	9	10	10	10	10	10	11	11	11	11	11	11	11	11	11	11	11	11	11

Updated to match(es) played on 27 February 2021. Source: Indian Super League
A = Away; H = Home; W = Win; D = Draw; L = Loss

== Personnel ==
Position	Name
Head coach	(Scotland) Stuart Baxter
Assistant Coaches	(Republic of Ireland) Gerry Peyton
Assistant Coaches	(India) Steven Dias
Goalkeeping Coach	(Brazil) Rogerio Ramos
Strength & Conditioning Coach	(Spain) Joan Casanova
Team Manager	(India) Ravi Khedar
Head of Football Operations	(India) Abhik Chatterjee
Performance & Recruitment Analyst	(India) Abhijit Bharali
Head of Football Development	(India) Aakash Narula
Head of Youth Development	(India) Steven Dias
Youth Teams Manager	(India) Sayantan Ganguly
Grassroots Manager	(India) Suvam Das
Team Doctor	(India) Praveen Choudhary
Team Physiotherapist	(India) Firoz Shaikh
Team Masseur	(India) Bybu Ponnarassery Ravunny Thrissur
Kit Manager	(India) Tara Joshi

== Statistics ==
=== Appearances ===
No.	Pos	Nat	Player	Total		ISL	
No.	Pos	Nat	Player	Apps	Goals	Apps	Goals
Goalkeepers
1	GK	(India) IND	Arshdeep Singh	17	0	16+1	0
21	GK	(India) IND	Kamaljit Singh	3	0	3+0	0
23	GK	(India) IND	Ravi Kumar	2	0	1+1	0
30	GK	(India) IND	Ankit Bhuyan	0	0	0+0	0
Defenders
3	DF	(India) IND	Mohammad Sajid Dhot	6	0	4+2	0
5	DF	(India) IND	Hendry Antonay	11	0	11+0	0
12	DF	(India) IND	Saurabh Meher	3	0	1+2	0
13	DF	(India) IND	Gaurav Bora	18	0	18+0	0
15	DF	(India) IND	Shubham Sarangi	14	0	10+4	0
18	DF	(Australia) AUS	Jacob Tratt	17	0	17+0	0
26	DF	(India) IND	Kamalpreet Singh	4	0	2+2	0
27	DF	(England) ENG	Steven Taylor	17	2	17+0	2
32	DF	(India) IND	George D'Souza	2	0	2+0	0
66	DF	(India) IND	Rakesh Pradhan	8	0	8+0	0
Midfielders
2	MF	(India) IND	Thoiba Singh Moirangthem	1	0	1+0	0
4	MF	(India) IND	Lalhrezuala Sailung	2	1	2+0	1
6	MF	(South Africa) RSA	Cole Alexander	15	3	15+0	3
8	MF	(India) IND	Paul Ramfangzauva	5	2	4+1	2
9	MF	(India) IND	Samuel Lalmuanpuia	3	0	0+3	0
16	MF	(India) IND	Vinit Rai	13	0	12+1	0
17	MF	(India) IND	Jerry Mawihmingthanga	17	2	16+1	2
19	MF	(India) IND	Isak Vanlalruatfela	2	0	0+2	0
22	MF	(India) IND	Nanda Kumar	11	0	6+5	0
28	MF	(India) IND	Laishram Premjit Singh	5	0	2+3	0
33	MF	(India) IND	Baoringdao Bodo	1	0	1+0	0
Forwards
7	FW	(Australia) AUS	Brad Inman	6	1	5+1	1
10	FW	(Brazil) BRA	Marcelinho Leite Pereira	8	0	4+4	0
11	FW	(Brazil) BRA	Diego Maurício	20	12	17+3	12
14	FW	(India) IND	Daniel Lalhlimpuia	12	0	7+5	0
24	FW	(Spain) ESP	Manuel Onwu	18	0	15+3	0

- Source: Indian Super League

Updated: 27 February 2021

=== Goal scorers ===
Rank	No.	Pos.	Nat.	Player	ISL
1	11	FW	(Brazil)	Diego Maurício	12
2	6	DF	(South Africa)	Cole Alexander	3
3	8	MF	(India)	Paul Ramfangzauva	2
3	17	MF	(India)	Jerry Mawihmingthanga	2
3	27	DF	(England)	Steven Taylor	2
6	4	MF	(India)	Lalhrezuala Sailung	1
6	7	MF	(Australia)	Brad Inman	1
Own goals					2
Total					25

Source: Indian Super League
Updated: 27 February 2021

=== Assists ===
Rank	No.	Pos.	Nat.	Player	ISL	Total
1	17	MF	(India)	Jerry Mawihmingthanga	5	5
2	7	FW	(Australia)	Brad Inman	2	2
2	11	FW	(Brazil)	Diego Mauricio	2	2
2	14	FW	(India)	Daniel Lalhlimpuia	2	2
2	24	FW	(Spain)	Manuel Onwu	2	2
3	5	DF	(India)	Hendry Antonay	1	1
3	6	MF	(South Africa)	Cole Alexander	1	1
3	18	DF	(Australia)	Jacob Tratt	1	1
3	22	MF	(India)	Nanda Kumar	1	1
3	66	DF	(India)	Rakesh Pradhan	1	1

Source: Indian Super League
Updated: 27 February 2021

=== Clean sheets ===
Rank	No.	Nat.	Player	ISL	Total
1	1	(India)	Arshdeep Singh	1	1
Total:				1	1

Source: Indian Super League
Updated: 10 January 2021

=== Disciplinary record ===
Rank	No.	Pos.	Nat.	Player	ISL		Total	
Rank	No.	Pos.	Nat.	Player	Booked	Sent off (straight red)	Booked	Sent off (straight red)
1	18	DF	(Australia)	Jacob Tratt	7	0	7	0
2	6	MF	(South Africa)	Cole Alexander	5	0	5	0
2	13	DF	(India)	Gaurav Bora	5	0	5	0
2	27	DF	(England)	Steven Taylor	5	0	5	0
3	15	DF	(India)	Shubham Sarangi	4	0	4	0
3	16	MF	(India)	Vinit Rai	4	0	4	0
3	24	FW	(Spain)	Manuel Onwu	4	0	4	0
4	5	DF	(India)	Hendry Antonay	3	0	3	0
4	17	MF	(India)	Jerry Mawihmingthanga	3	0	3	0
5	3	DF	(India)	Mohammad Sajid Dhot	2	0	2	0
5	11	FW	(Brazil)	Diego Maurício	2	0	2	0
5	12	DF	(India)	Saurabh Meher	2	0	2	0
5	66	MF	(India)	Rakesh Pradhan	2	0	2	0
6	1	GK	(India)	Arshdeep Singh	1	0	1	0
6	22	MF	(India)	Nanda Kumar	1	0	1	0
Total:					50	0	50	0

Source: Indian Super League
Updated: 27 February 2021

== See also ==
- 2020–21 in Indian football
- 2020–21 Indian Super League
