= List of 2020–21 Indian Super League transfers =

2020–21 Indian Super League transfers
- Season: 2020–21 Indian Super League season

The following is a list of transfers and squad changes for the 2020–21 Indian Super League season. The list includes both pre-season and mid-season transfers.

== Transfers ==
All clubs without a flag are or were members of the Indian Super League.

Date	Name	Moving from	Moving to	Ref.
22 May 2020	(India) Samuel Lalmuanpuia	Kerala Blasters	Odisha	
1 June 2020	(India) Redeem Tlang	NorthEast United	FC Goa	
1 June 2020	(Croatia) Mato Grgić	Mumbai City	(Croatia) Rudeš	
2 June 2020	(Malta) André Schembri	Chennaiyin	Retired	
3 June 2020	(India) George D'Souza	(India) Sporting Goa	Odisha	
3 June 2020	(India) Pratik Chaudhari	Mumbai City	Bengaluru	
3 June 2020	(India) Lalthuammawia Ralte	FC Goa	Bengaluru	
4 June 2020	(India) Subrata Pal	Jamshedpur	Hyderabad	
5 June 2020	(India) Joe Zoherliana	(India) Aizawl	Bengaluru	
5 June 2020	(India) Wungngayam Muirang	(India) Gokulam Kerala	Bengaluru	
5 June 2020	(India) Hendry Antonay	Chennaiyin	Odisha	
5 June 2020	(India) Saurabh Meher	(India) Indian Arrows	Odisha	
9 June 2020	(India) Kamaljit Singh	Hyderabad	Odisha	
11 June 2020	(India) Baoringdao Bodo	(India) Kerala Blasters Reserves	Odisha	
11 June 2020	(India) Laishram Premjit Singh	(India) TRAU	Odisha	
13 June 2020	(India) Kamalpreet Singh	East Bengal	Odisha	
16 June 2020	(India) Thoiba Singh Moirangthem	(India) Punjab	Odisha	
20 June 2020	(India) Sanson Pereira	(India) Salgaocar	FC Goa	
20 June 2020	(Brazil) Cleiton Silva	(Thailand) Suphanburi	Bengaluru	
24 June 2020	(India) Isak Vanlalruatfela	(India) Aizawl	Odisha	
24 June 2020	(India) Paul Ramfangzauva	(India) Aizawl	Odisha	
25 June 2020	(Fiji) Roy Krishna	ATK	ATK Mohun Bagan	
29 June 2020	(India) Ravi Kumar	Mumbai City	Odisha	
8 July 2020	(India) Albino Gomes	Odisha	Kerala Blasters	
15 July 2020	(India) Ritwik Das	(India) Real Kashmir	Kerala Blasters	
15 July 2020	(India) Prabir Das	ATK	ATK Mohun Bagan	
17 July 2020	(India) Makan Chote	(India) Punjab	FC Goa	
17 July 2020	(Spain) Agus	ATK	Retired	
22 July 2020	(India) Nishu Kumar	Bengaluru	Kerala Blasters	
22 July 2020	(Spain) Igor Angulo	(Poland) Górnik Zabrze	FC Goa	
29 July 2020	(India) Pritam Kotal	ATK	ATK Mohun Bagan	
29 July 2020	(India) Akshunna Tyagi	(India) Odisha Academy	Odisha	
29 July 2020	(India) Jones Lalthakima	(India) Odisha Academy	Odisha	
29 July 2020	(India) Nischay Adhikari	(India) Odisha Academy	Odisha	
29 July 2020	(India) Rishab Dobriyal	(India) Odisha Academy	Odisha	
29 July 2020	(India) Ronaldo Wairokpam	(India) Odisha Academy	Odisha	
2 August 2020	(India) Jobby Justin	ATK	ATK Mohun Bagan	
5 August 2020	(India) Denechandra Meitei	(India) TRAU	Kerala Blasters	
6 August 2020	(Spain) Jorge Ortiz	(Spain) Atlético Baleares	FC Goa	
6 August 2020	(Spain) Edu García	ATK	ATK Mohun Bagan	
7 August 2020	(Portugal) Paulo Machado	Mumbai City	(Portugal) Leixões	
10 August 2020	(India) Sheikh Sahil	(India) Mohun Bagan	ATK Mohun Bagan	
11 August 2020	(Spain) Iván González	(Spain) Cultural Leonesa	FC Goa	
13 August 2020	(India) Subhasish Bose	Mumbai City	ATK Mohun Bagan	
13 August 2020	(India) Halicharan Narzary	Kerala Blasters	Hyderabad	
15 August 2020	(India) Sumit Rathi	ATK	ATK Mohun Bagan	
18 August 2020	(India) Jackichand Singh	FC Goa	Jamshedpur	
19 August 2020	(India) Givson Singh	(India) Indian Arrows	Kerala Blasters	
20 August 2020	(Republic of Ireland) Carl McHugh	ATK	ATK Mohun Bagan	
21 August 2020	(Lithuania) Nerijus Valskis	Chennaiyin	Jamshedpur	
22 August 2020	(India) Sandeep Singh	(India) TRAU	Kerala Blasters	
22 August 2020	(India) Ajith Kumar	(India) Chennai City	Bengaluru	
24 August 2020	(India) Pawan Kumar	NorthEast United	Jamshedpur	
25 August 2020	(India) Manvir Singh	FC Goa	ATK Mohun Bagan	
26 August 2020	(India) Rohit Kumar	Hyderabad	Kerala Blasters	
27 August 2020	(India) Ricky Lallawmawma	ATK	Jamshedpur	
27 August 2020	(India) Aman Chetri	(India) Chennaiyin B	Chennaiyin	
27 August 2020	(India) Samik Mitra	(India) Chennaiyin B	Chennaiyin	
28 August 2020	(Brazil) João Victor	(Greece) OFI	Hyderabad	
28 August 2020	(Nigeria) Bartholomew Ogbeche	Kerala Blasters	Released	
31 August 2020	(Brazil) Diego Maurício	(Brazil) CSA	Odisha	
31 August 2020	(Brazil) Alex	(Vietnam) Ho Chi Minh City	Jamshedpur	
2 September 2020	(Brazil) Marcelinho	Hyderabad	Odisha	
2 September 2020	(Argentina) Facundo Pereyra	(Cyprus) Apollon Limassol	Kerala Blasters	
3 September 2020	(Spain) Alberto Noguera	(Spain) Numancia	FC Goa	
3 September 2020	(Australia) Joel Chianese	(Australia) Perth Glory	Hyderabad	
3 September 2020	(India) Laldinliana Renthlei	Chennaiyin	Jamshedpur	
5 September 2020	(India) Chinglensana Singh	FC Goa	Hyderabad	
6 September 2020	(England) Peter Hartley	(Scotland) Motherwell	Jamshedpur	
7 September 2020	(Afghanistan) Masih Saighani	Chennaiyin	Released	
7 September 2020	(India) Zohmingliana Ralte	Chennaiyin	Released	
8 September 2020	(India) Rehenesh TP	Kerala Blasters	Jamshedpur	
8 September 2020	(Romania) Lucian Goian	Chennaiyin	Released	
8 September 2020	(Australia) David Williams	ATK	ATK Mohun Bagan	
8 September 2020	(Spain) Lluís Sastre	(Cyprus) AEK Larnaca	Hyderabad	
9 September 2020	(India) Prabhsukhan Singh Gill	Bengaluru	Kerala Blasters	
10 September 2020	(Nigeria) Stephen Eze	(Kazakhstan) Tobol	Jamshedpur	
11 September 2020	(Australia) Jacob Tratt	(Australia) Perth Glory	Odisha	
12 September 2020	(Spain) Tiri	Jamshedpur	ATK Mohun Bagan	
13 September 2020	(Spain) Manuel Onwu	Bengaluru	Odisha	
13 September 2020	(India) Lalchhuanmawia	Odisha	Chennaiyin	
13 September 2020	(India) Reagan Singh	NorthEast United	Chennaiyin	
13 September 2020	(India) Bhupender Singh	(Spain) Olímpic Xàtiva	Jamshedpur	
13 September 2020	(India) William Lalnunfela	(India) Aizawl	Jamshedpur	
14 September 2020	(India) Lalawmpuia	(India) FC Goa Reserves	Hyderabad	
14 September 2020	(India) Sweden Fernandes	(India) FC Goa Reserves	Hyderabad	
14 September 2020	(Spain) Aridane Santana	Odisha	(Spain) Cultural Leonesa (loan return)	
14 September 2020	(Spain) Carlos Delgado	Odisha	(Spain) Castellón (loan return)	
14 September 2020	(Spain) Marcos Tébar	Odisha	Released	
14 September 2020	(Argentina) Martín Pérez	Odisha	(Argentina) Gimnasia y Esgrima de Jujuy	
14 September 2020	(Spain) Xisco Hernández	Odisha	Released	
16 September 2020	(India) Lalthathanga Khawlhring	NorthEast United	Kerala Blasters	
16 September 2020	(England) Steven Taylor	(New Zealand) Wellington Phoenix	Odisha	
17 September 2020	(Spain) Aridane Santana	(Spain) Cultural Leonesa	Hyderabad	
18 September 2020	(India) Phrangki Buam	(India) Shillong Lajong	FC Goa	
19 September 2020	(Spain) Odei Onaindia	(Spain) Mirandés	Hyderabad	
21 September 2020	(Bosnia and Herzegovina) Enes Sipović	(Qatar) Umm Salal	Chennaiyin	
21 September 2020	(Australia) Brad Inman	(Australia) Brisbane Roar	ATK Mohun Bagan	
21 September 2020	(Spain) Fran Sandaza	(Spain) Alcorcón	Hyderabad	
23 September 2020	(Spain) Vicente Gómez	(Spain) Deportivo de La Coruña	Kerala Blasters	
24 September 2020	(Mauritania) Khassa Camara	(Greece) Xanthi	NorthEast United	
26 September 2020	(Australia) James Donachie	(Australia) Newcastle Jets	FC Goa (on loan)	
26 September 2020	(India) Sandesh Jhingan	Kerala Blasters	ATK Mohun Bagan	
26 September 2020	(Portugal) Luís Machado	(Portugal) Moreirense	NorthEast United	
28 September 2020	(India) Amit Tudu	Odisha	Released	
28 September 2020	(India) Bikramjit Singh	Odisha	Released	
28 September 2020	(India) Rana Gharami	Odisha	Released	
28 September 2020	(India) Romeo Fernandes	Odisha	Released	
29 September 2020	(Spain) Coro	FC Goa	(Spain) Atlético Baleares	
30 September 2020	(Spain) Javi Hernández	ATK	ATK Mohun Bagan	
30 September 2020	(India) Nikhil Prabhu	(India) Hyderabad Reserves	Hyderabad	
30 September 2020	(India) V.P. Suhair	(India) Mohun Bagan	NorthEast United	
1 October 2020	(India) Devendra Murgaonkar	(India) Salgaocar	FC Goa	
1 October 2020	(India) Leander D’Cunha	(India) FC Goa Reserves	Goa	
1 October 2020	(India) Glan Martins	(India) Churchill Brothers	ATK Mohun Bagan	
1 October 2020	(Belgium) Benjamin Lambot	(Cyprus) Nea Salamis Famagusta	NorthEast United	
2 October 2020	(Australia) Dylan Fox	(Australia) Central Coast Mariners	NorthEast United	
3 October 2020	(India) Ishan Pandita	(Spain) Lorca	FC Goa	
3 October 2020	(India) Lara Sharma	ATK	Bengaluru	
27 October 2020	(Japan) Cy Goddard	(Italy) Benevento	Mumbai City (loan)	
4 October 2020	(Brazil) Memo	Jamshedpur	Chennaiyin	
4 October 2020	(India) Darren Caldeira	Kerala Blasters	Released	
4 October 2020	(Netherlands) Gianni Zuiverloon	Kerala Blasters	Released	
4 October 2020	(Brazil) Jairo Rodrigues	Kerala Blasters	Released	
4 October 2020	(Spain) Mario Arqués	Kerala Blasters	Released	
4 October 2020	(India) Mohammed Rafi	Kerala Blasters	Released	
4 October 2020	(India) Mohammad Rakip	Kerala Blasters	Released	
4 October 2020	(Senegal) Mouhamadou Gning	Kerala Blasters	Released	
4 October 2020	(India) Pritam Kumar Singh	Kerala Blasters	Released	
4 October 2020	(India) Raju Gaikwad	Kerala Blasters	Released	
4 October 2020	(Cameroon) Raphaël Messi Bouli	Kerala Blasters	Released	
4 October 2020	(North Macedonia) Vlatko Drobarov	Kerala Blasters	Released	
5 October 2020	(England) Gary Hooper	(New Zealand) Wellington Phoenix	Kerala Blasters	
6 October 2020	(India) Ashutosh Mehta	(India) Mohun Bagan	NorthEast United	
8 October 2020	(India) Lalkhawpuimawia	(India) Churchill Brothers	NorthEast United	
8 October 2020	(India) Rochharzela	(India) Aizawl	NorthEast United	
10 October 2020	(South Africa) Cole Alexander	(South Africa) Bidvest West	Odisha	
10 October 2020	(Zimbabwe) Costa Nhamoinesu	(Czech Republic) Sparta Prague	Kerala Blasters	
11 October 2020	(Guinea-Bissau) Esmaël Gonçalves	(Japan) Matsumoto Yamaga	Chennaiyin	
11 October 2020	(India) Arindam Bhattacharya	ATK	ATK Mohun Bagan	
13 October 2020	(Australia) Scott Neville	(Australia) Brisbane Roar	East Bengal (loan)	
14 October 2020	(India) Thoi Singh	(India) Reliance Foundation Young Champs	Bengaluru	
14 October 2020	(India) Aqib Nawab	(India) Reliance Foundation Young Champs	Chennaiyin	
14 October 2020	(India) G Balaji	(India) Reliance Foundation Young Champs	Chennaiyin	
14 October 2020	(India) Koustav Dutta	(India) Reliance Foundation Young Champs	Hyderabad	
14 October 2020	(India) Aritra Das	(India) Reliance Foundation Young Champs	Kerala Blasters	
14 October 2020	(India) Birendra Singh	(India) Reliance Foundation Young Champs	Kerala Blasters	
14 October 2020	(India) Muhammed Basith PT	(India) Reliance Foundation Young Champs	Kerala Blasters	
14 October 2020	(India) Ayush Chhikara	(India) Reliance Foundation Young Champs	Mumbai City	
14 October 2020	(Ghana) Kwesi Appiah	(England) AFC Wimbledon	NorthEast United	
14 October 2020	(India) Mandar Rao Dessai	FC Goa	Mumbai City	
15 October 2020	(Tajikistan) Fatkhullo Fatkhuloev	(Tajikistan) Khujand	Chennaiyin	
15 October 2020	(India) Vikram Pratap Singh	(India) Indian Arrows	Mumbai City	
16 October 2020	(India) Farukh Choudhary	Jamshedpur FC	Mumbai City	
16 October 2020	(India) Akash Mishra	(India) Indian Arrows	Hyderabad	
16 October 2020	(India) Lalbiakhlua Jongte	(India) Indian Arrows	Hyderabad	
16 October 2020	(India) Rohit Danu	(India) Indian Arrows	Hyderabad	
17 October 2020	(Brazil) Raphael Augusto	(India) Bengaluru	Released	
17 October 2020	(Morocco) Hugo Boumous	FC Goa	Mumbai City	
17 October 2020	(Republic of Ireland) Anthony Pilkington	(England) Wigan Athletic	East Bengal	
17 October 2020	(Wales) Aaron Amadi-Holloway	(Australia) Brisbane Roar	East Bengal	
18 October 2020	(Senegal) Mourtada Fall	FC Goa	Mumbai City	
18 October 2020	(India) Jeje Lalpekhlua	Chennaiyin	East Bengal	
18 October 2020	(Scotland) Danny Fox	(England) Wigan Athletic	East Bengal	
18 October 2020	(Germany) Matti Steinmann	(New Zealand) Wellington Phoenix	East Bengal	
19 October 2020	(India) Narayan Das	Odisha	East Bengal	
19 October 2020	(England) Adam Le Fondre	(Australia) Sydney FC	Mumbai City (loan)	
19 October 2020	(Democratic Republic of the Congo) Jacques Maghoma	(England) Birmingham City	East Bengal	
19 October 2020	(Spain) Albert Serrán	Bengaluru	Released	
20 October 2020	(Slovakia) Jakub Sylvestr	(Israel) Hapoel Haifa	Chennaiyin	
20 October 2020	(Spain) Fran González	(India) Mohun Bagan	Bengaluru	
20 October 2020	(Norway) Kristian Opseth	(Australia) Adelaide United	Bengaluru	
20 October 2020	(Guinea) Idrissa Sylla	(Belgium) Zulte Waregem	NorthEast United	
20 October 2020	(India) Mohammad Rakip	Kerala Blasters	Mumbai City	
20 October 2020	(India) Muhammed Nemil	Reliance Foundation Young Champs	FC Goa	
21 October 2020	(Australia) Nick Fitzgerald	(Australia) Newcastle Jets	Jamshedpur	
1 January 2021	(Nigeria) Bright Enobakhare	(Greece) AEK Athens	East Bengal	

== See also ==
- Indian Super League
- 2020–21 Indian Super League season
