= Marcelo =

Marcelo is a given name, the Spanish and Portuguese form of Marcellus. Marcelo may refer to:

== Given name ==
- Marcelo Costa de Andrade (born 1967), Brazilian serial killer, rapist, and necrophile
- Marcelo Arriagada (born 1973), Chilean road cyclist
- Marcelo Barovero (born 1984), Argentine football goalkeeper
- Marcelo Barticciotto (born 1967), Argentine-born Chilean former footballer and manager
- Marcelo Bielsa (born 1955), Argentine football manager
- Marcelo Bordon (born 1976), Brazilian footballer
- Marcelo Brozović (born 1992), Croatian footballer
- Marcelo Cabo (born 1966), Brazilian football manager
- Marcelo Carrusca (born 1983), Argentine-Australian professional footballer
- Marcelo Cassaro (born 1970), Brazilian author of comics
- Marcelo Chamusca (born 1966), Brazilian professional football manager and former player
- Marcelo Chierighini (born 1991), Brazilian competitive swimmer
- Marcelo Cirino (born 1992), Brazilian footballer
- Marcelo D'Andrea, Argentine film actor
- Marcelo Del Debbio (born 1974), Brazilian architect and writer
- Marcelo Demoliner (born 1989), Brazilian tennis player
- Marcelo "Cello" Dias, bass guitarist for American alternative rock band Against All Will
- Marcelo Díaz (born 1986), Chilean professional footballer
- Marcelo Djian (born 1966), Brazilian footballer of Armenian descent
- Marcelo Fromer (1961–2001), guitarist of Brazilian rock band Titãs
- Marcelo Garraffo (born 1957), Argentine retired field hockey player
- Marcelo Aguiar Quarterole (born 1978 RJ state), striker
- Marcelo José da Silva (born 1976), known as Marcelo Silva, Brazilian former footballer
- Marcelo Lima (born 1983), Brazilian politician
- Marcelo Lipatín (born 1977), Uruguayan football (soccer) player
- Marcelo Mayer (born 2002), American baseball player
- Marcelo Melo (born 1983), Brazilian tennis player
- Marcelo Negrão (born 1972), volleyball player from Brazil
- Marcelo Pelé (born 1976), Brazilian striker
- Marcelo Ramos (footballer, born 1973), Brazilian former soccer player as a striker
- Marcelo Rebelo de Sousa (born 1946), current President of Portugal
- Marcelo Ríos (born 1975), Chilean former World No. 1 tennis player
- Marcelo Signorelli (born 1963), Italian-Uruguayan professional basketball coach, book author and former player

== Mononym ==
- Marcelo (footballer, born 1969), Brazilian striker best known for his time at Benfica and Birmingham City
- Marcelo (footballer, born 1984), Brazilian goalkeeper who played for Corinthians
- Marcelo (footballer, born January 1987), Brazilian football defensive midfielder who played for Ethnikos Achna and ASA
- Marcelo (footballer, born May 1987), Brazilian football centre-back who played for Lyon
- Marcelo (footballer, born 1988), Brazilian football left-back who played for Real Madrid
- Marcelo (footballer, born 1989), Brazilian football centre-back who played for Rio Ave and Chicago Fire
- Marcelo (footballer, born 1990), Brazilian football right-back
- Marcelo (footballer, born 1991), Brazilian football centre-back who played for Volta Redonda and Chapecoense
- Marcelo (footballer, born 1998), Brazilian football forward who plays for Cruzeiro
- Marčelo (born 1983 as Marko Šelić), Serbian hip-hop artist

== See also ==
- Marcelinho, a diminutive form of Marcelo
- Marcello, the Italian version of Marcelo
