= Marcelinho =

Marcelinho is a diminutive form of the given name Marcelo, and may refer to:

== Sports ==
=== Football ===
- Marcelinho Carioca (born 1971), born Marcelo Pereira Surcin, Brazilian attacking midfielder
- Marcelinho Paulista (born 1973), born Marcelo José de Souza, Brazilian manager and former midfielder
- Marcelinho Paraíba (born 1975), born Marcelo dos Santos, Brazilian manager and former midfielder
- Marcelinho (footballer, born February 1978), born Marcelo de Souza Ramos, Brazilian attacking midfielder
- Marcelinho (footballer, born September 1978), born Marcelo Aguiar Quarterole, Brazilian manager and former striker
- Marcelinho (footballer, born 1981), born Marcelo Santos Oliveira, Brazilian football attacking midfielder
- Marcelinho (footballer, born 1983), Born Marcelo Luis de Almeida Carmo, Brazilian rightback
- Marcelinho (footballer, born August 1984), born Marcelo Nascimento da Costa, Bulgarian attacking midfielder
- Marcelinho (footballer, born September 1984), born Marcelo Oliveira da Silva, Brazilian striker
- Marcelinho (footballer, born 1986), born Marcelo Roberto Lima de Mattos, Brazilian attacking midfielder
- Marcelinho (footballer, born January 1987), born Marcelo Rodrigues, Brazilian forward
- Marcelinho (footballer, born June 1987), born Marcelo Leite Pereira, Brazilian forward
- Marcelinho (footballer, born 1990), born Marcelo Gil Fernando, Brazilian striker
- Marcelinho (footballer, born 1994), born Marcelo Henrique França de Siqueira, Brazilian forward
- Marcelinho (footballer, born April 1998), born Marcelo dos Santos Rosa, Brazilian winger
- Marcelinho (footballer, born September 1998), born Marcelo da Silva Ibiapina, Brazilian football midfielder
- Marcelinho (footballer, born 1996), born Marcelo Antônio de Oliveira, Brazilian winger
- Marcelinho (footballer, born 2002), born Marcelo José de Lima Filho, Brazilian forward

=== Other sports ===
- Marcelinho Elgarten (born 1974), born Marcelo Elgarten, Brazilian volleyball player
- Marcelinho Huertas (born 1983), born Marcelo Tieppo Huertas, Brazilian basketball player
- Marcelinho Machado (born 1985), born Marcelo Magalhães Machado, Brazilian basketball player

== Arts and Entertainment ==
- Marcelinho da Lua (born 1972), Brazilian singer and DJ

== See also ==
- Marcelo
