= Del Debbio =

Del Debbio is a surname of Italian origin. Notable people with this surname include:

- Armando Del Debbio (1904 - 1984), Brazilian footballer who played in the role of left back
- Enrico Del Debbio (1891 – 1973), Italian architect and university professor
- Marcelo Del Debbio (born 1974), Brazilian architect
