= Lalhrezuala Sailung =

Indian footballer

Personal information
- Date of birth: 17 March 2001 (age 25)
- Place of birth: Lunglei, Mizoram, India
- Height: 1.71 m (5 ft 7 in)
- Position: Right-back

Team information
- Current team: Bengaluru United
- Number: 14

Youth career
- 2018–2019: Odisha B

Senior career*
Years	Team	Apps	(Gls)
2019–2024	Odisha	11	(1)
2023	→ Sudeva Delhi (loan)	9	(0)
2023–2024	→ Aizawl (loan)	9	(0)
2024–2025	Aizawl	17	(0)
2025–	Bengaluru United	7	(0)
- * Club domestic league appearances and goals as of 17 November 2026

Lalhrezuala Sailung (born 17 March 2001) is an Indian professional footballer who plays as a defender for Indian Football League club Bengaluru United.

== Career ==
=== Youth career and Odisha FC ===
Born in Lunglei, Mizoram, Lalhrezuala was part of Odisha FC's academy. As part of the club's academy training programme, he was sent to Aspire Academy in Doha, Qatar.

He was promoted to Odisha FC's first-team squad during the 2019–20 season. He made his Indian Super League debut on 17 February 2021 against FC Goa. On 27 February 2021, he scored his first goal for Odisha FC in a 6–5 victory over East Bengal, which became the highest-scoring match in Indian Super League history at the time.

=== Loan spells ===
On 5 January 2023, Lalhrezuala joined Sudeva Delhi from Odisha FC on loan for the remainder of the 2022–23 season. He made nine appearances in the league for the club.

On 27 July 2023, he joined Aizawl FC on another loan from Odisha FC for the 2023–24 season. He made nine league appearances during the campaign before returning to Odisha FC at the end of the loan on 31 May 2024.

In July 2024, he moved from Odisha FC to Aizawl FC on a permanent transfer, with the transfer fee undisclosed. During the 2024–25 season, he made 17 appearances for Aizawl in the league.

=== FC Bengaluru United ===
On 8 July 2025, Lalhrezuala joined Bengaluru United from Aizawl FC on a free transfer. His registration with the club was recorded as permanent, with professional status and a nine-month contract period.

He featured for Bengaluru United in the 2025–26 I-League 2 season, making seven appearances and playing 630 minutes. He wore the number 14 shirt during the campaign.

== Career statistics ==
=== Club ===
As of 17 November 2026

Club	Season	League			National Cup		League Cup		AFC		Total	
Club	Season	Division	Apps	Goals	Apps	Goals	Apps	Goals	Apps	Goals	Apps	Goals
Odisha	2019–20	Indian Super League	0	0	—		—		—		0	0
Odisha	2020–21	Indian Super League	2	1	—		—		—		2	1
Odisha	2021–22	Indian Super League	9	0	—		—		—		9	0
Odisha	Total		11	1	0	0	0	0	0	0	11	1
Sudeva Delhi (loan)	2022–23	I-League	9	0	—		—		—		9	0
Aizawl (loan)	2023–24	I-League	9	0	—		—		—		9	0
Aizawl	2024–25	I-League	17	0	—		—		—		17	0
Bengaluru United	2025–26	I-League 2	7	0	—		—		—		7	0
Career total			53	1	0	0	0	0	0	0	53	1
