= 2022–23 U-17 Youth Cup =

U17 football league in India

Youth League
- Season: 2022–23
- Dates: 22 December 2022 – 31 January 2023
- Champions: Classic FA (1st title)
- Matches: 111
- Goals: 402 (3.62 per match)
- Top goalscorer: Lemet Tangvah (Chandigarh FA) (10 goals)
- Highest scoring: Chandigarh FA 13–0 Ladakh Football School and Academy
- Total attendance: 925 (knockout stage)
- Average attendance: 62 (knockout stage)
- All statistics correct as of 31 January 2023. For detailed group stage matches click here.

The 2022–23 Youth League, also known as 2022–23 Hero U-17 Youth Cup (for sponsorship ties with Hero MotoCorp), was the thirteenth season of the Indian Youth League and the first season of the competition as an under-17 category.

The 2019–20 season was abandoned midway and the league was not held since then due to the coronavirus pandemic.

== Changes in format ==
The new season saw reduction in number of games with a short format spanning over a month.

- The tournament would take place across ten venues, with single round-robin format in the group and knockout stage.
- The 49 teams from 29 states and union territories were divided in ten groups. Ten group winners and six best group runners-up qualified for the knockout stage.
- Round of 16 has been introduced for the first time ever.

== Teams ==
A total of 49 teams from 29 states and union territories participate in the tournament. States and union territories without any teams include: Andaman and Nicobar Islands, Andhra Pradesh, Arunachal Pradesh, Haryana, Mizoram, Nagaland and Tripura.

Club	State/Region	Group	Venue
Alchemy International FA	Karnataka	A	Dravid Padukone Centre of Excellence, Bengaluru, Karnataka
Parappur FC	Kerala	A	Dravid Padukone Centre of Excellence, Bengaluru, Karnataka
Lakshadweep Football Academy	Lakshadweep	A	Dravid Padukone Centre of Excellence, Bengaluru, Karnataka
Garhwal FC	Delhi	A	Dravid Padukone Centre of Excellence, Bengaluru, Karnataka
Mumbai Kenkre FC	Maharashtra	A	Dravid Padukone Centre of Excellence, Bengaluru, Karnataka
Mohun Bagan SG	West Bengal	B	Barrackpore Stadium, Kolkata, West Bengal
Sanju Football Academy	Sikkim	B	Barrackpore Stadium, Kolkata, West Bengal
FAO Academy	Odisha	B	Barrackpore Stadium, Kolkata, West Bengal
Minerva Academy FC	Punjab	B	Barrackpore Stadium, Kolkata, West Bengal
Football 4 Change Academy	Manipur	B	Barrackpore Stadium, Kolkata, West Bengal
Alpha Sports Academy	Bihar	C	Patliputra Sports Complex, Patna, Bihar
Hyderabad FC	Telangana	C	Patliputra Sports Complex, Patna, Bihar
Odisha FC	Odisha	C	Patliputra Sports Complex, Patna, Bihar
Techtro Swades United FC	Himachal Pradesh	C	Patliputra Sports Complex, Patna, Bihar
Young Heroes	Uttar Pradesh	C	Patliputra Sports Complex, Patna, Bihar
Classic Football Academy	Manipur	D	SAI Ground, Imphal, Manipur
Gauhati Town Club	Assam	D	SAI Ground, Imphal, Manipur
Shillong Lajong FC	Meghalya	D	SAI Ground, Imphal, Manipur
East Bengal Club	West Bengal	D	SAI Ground, Imphal, Manipur
Jamshedpur FC	Jharkhand	D	SAI Ground, Imphal, Manipur
Sreenidi Deccan FC	Telangana	E	Deccan Arena, Hyderabad, Telangana
Mumbai City	Maharashtra	E	Deccan Arena, Hyderabad, Telangana
Gandhinagar FC	Gujarat	E	Deccan Arena, Hyderabad, Telangana
Silvassa United FC	Daman and Diu	E	Deccan Arena, Hyderabad, Telangana
Jeppiaar Institute of Technology FC	Puducherry	E	Deccan Arena, Hyderabad, Telangana
Punjab State FA U-17	Punjab	F	Sri Harigobind Stadium, Phagwara, Punjab
Kumaon Heroes	Uttar Pradesh	F	Sri Harigobind Stadium, Phagwara, Punjab
Real Lona FC	Ladakh	F	Sri Harigobind Stadium, Phagwara, Punjab
Real Kashmir FC	Jammu & Kashmir	F	Sri Harigobind Stadium, Phagwara, Punjab
Himalayan FC Kinnaur	Himachal Pradesh	F	Sri Harigobind Stadium, Phagwara, Punjab
SAIL Football Academy	Jharkhand	G	MKM Stadium, Bokaro, Jharkhand
KR Football Leaders	Uttarakhand	G	MKM Stadium, Bokaro, Jharkhand
Rajasthan United FC	Rajasthan	G	MKM Stadium, Bokaro, Jharkhand
Madan Maharaj FC	Madhya Pradesh	G	MKM Stadium, Bokaro, Jharkhand
Adani Sarguja Football Academy	Chhattisgarh	G	MKM Stadium, Bokaro, Jharkhand
Corbett FC	Uttarakhand	H	Amenity Sports Academy, Rudrapur, Uttarakhand
Ladakh Football Schools and Academy	Ladakh	H	Amenity Sports Academy, Rudrapur, Uttarakhand
Chandigarh Football Academy	Chandigarh	H	Amenity Sports Academy, Rudrapur, Uttarakhand
Sudeva Delhi FC	Delhi	H	Amenity Sports Academy, Rudrapur, Uttarakhand
RKM Football Academy	Chhattisgarh	I	Pant Stadium, Bhilai, Chhattisgarh
Premier Sporting Football Academy	Bihar	I	Pant Stadium, Bhilai, Chhattisgarh
Muthoot Football Academy	Kerala	I	Pant Stadium, Bhilai, Chhattisgarh
Chennaiyin FC	Tamil Nadu	I	Pant Stadium, Bhilai, Chhattisgarh
The Diamond Rock FA	Madhya Pradesh	I	Pant Stadium, Bhilai, Chhattisgarh
FC Goa	Goa	J	Benaulim Football Ground, Benaulim, Goa
Bengaluru FC	Karnataka	J	Benaulim Football Ground, Benaulim, Goa
ARA FC	Gujarat	J	Benaulim Football Ground, Benaulim, Goa
Zinc Football Academy	Rajasthan	J	Benaulim Football Ground, Benaulim, Goa
Churchill Brothers FC Goa	Goa	J	Benaulim Football Ground, Benaulim, Goa

== Group stage ==
Tiebreakers
The teams are ranked according to points (3 points for a win, 1 point for a draw, 0 points for a loss). If two or more teams are equal on points on completion of the group matches, the following criteria are applied in the order given to determine the rankings:
1. Greater number of points obtained in the matches between the Teams concerned
2. Goal difference resulting from the matches between the Teams concerned
3. Greater number of goals scored in the matches between the Teams concerned
4. Goal difference in all the matches
5. Greater number of goals scored in all the matches
6. Drawing of lots

As of 29 December 2022

=== Group A ===
All matches will be held in Bengaluru.

Pos	Team	Pld	W	D	L	GF	GA	GD	Pts	Qualification	GR	ALC	LFA	PAR	KEN
1	Garhwal FC	4	4	0	0	17	1	+16	12	Advanced to Knockout stage	—	—	6–0	—	—
2	Alchemy International FA	4	2	1	1	7	7	0	7		0–3	—	2–1	—	3–1
3	Lakshadweep FA	4	2	0	2	6	8	−2	6		—	—	—	3–0	2–0
4	Parappur FC	4	1	1	2	7	10	−3	4		1–4	2–2	—	—	—
5	Mumbai Kenkre	4	0	0	4	2	13	−11	0		—	—	—	1–4	—

Source: AIFF

=== Group B ===
All matches will be held in Kolkata.

Pos	Team	Pld	W	D	L	GF	GA	GD	Pts	Qualification	MIN	FFCA	ATKMB	FAO	SFA
1	Minerva Academy	4	4	0	0	12	1	+11	12	Advanced to Knockout stage	—	3–1	—	3–0	—
2	Football 4 Change Academy	4	2	1	1	13	3	+10	7		—	—	—	7–0	5–0
3	Mohun Bagan SG	4	1	2	1	3	3	0	5		0–2	0–0	—	1–1	—
4	FAO Academy	4	1	1	2	2	11	−9	4		—	—	—	—	1–0
5	Sanju FA	4	0	0	4	0	12	−12	0		0–4	—	0–2	—	—

Source: AIFF

=== Group C ===
All matches will be held in Patna.

Pos	Team	Pld	W	D	L	GF	GA	GD	Pts	Qualification	TSUFC	OFC	HFC	ASA	YH
1	Techtro Swades United	4	3	0	1	13	2	+11	9	Advanced to Knockout stage	—	—	1–3	0–1	—
2	Odisha	4	3	0	1	6	6	0	9	Advanced to Knockout stage	0–5	—	1–0	2–1	—
3	Hyderabad	4	2	0	2	7	6	+1	6		—	—	—	2–1	4–1
4	Alpha Sports Academy	4	2	0	2	4	4	0	6		—	—	—	—	1–0
5	Young Heroes	4	0	0	4	1	13	−12	0		0–5	0–3	—	—	—

Source: AIFF

=== Group D ===
All matches will be held in Imphal.

Pos	Team	Pld	W	D	L	GF	GA	GD	Pts	Qualification	CFA	EB	SHI	JAM	GTC
1	Classic FA	4	3	1	0	5	1	+4	10	Advanced to Knockout stage	—	1–0	—	1–0	3–1
2	East Bengal	4	2	1	1	4	2	+2	7		—	—	0–0	2–0	—
3	Shillong Lajong	4	1	3	0	4	1	+3	6		0–0	—	—	—	1–1
4	Jamshedpur	4	1	0	3	2	6	−4	3		—	—	0–3	—	—
5	Gauhati Town Club	4	0	1	3	3	8	−5	1		—	1–2	—	0–2	—

Source: AIFF

=== Group E ===
All matches will be held in Hyderabad.

Pos	Team	Pld	W	D	L	GF	GA	GD	Pts	Qualification	SRI	GAN	MUM	JIT	SIL
1	Sreenidi Deccan	4	3	1	0	11	2	+9	10	Advanced to Knockout stage	—	—	1–1	—	4–0
2	Gandhinagar	4	3	0	1	10	7	+3	9	Advanced to Knockout stage	1–3	—	3–2	—	—
3	Mumbai City	4	2	1	1	12	6	+6	7		—	—	—	—	5–0
4	Jeppiaar Institute of Technology	4	0	1	3	6	9	−3	1		0–3	1–3	2–4	—	—
5	Silvassa United	4	1	1	2	4	11	−7	4		—	1–3	—	1–1	—

Source: AIFF

=== Group F ===
All matches will be held in Phagwara.

Pos	Team	Pld	W	D	L	GF	GA	GD	Pts	Qualification	PUN	HIM	RKFC	KUM	RL
1	Punjab State FA	4	3	1	0	20	3	+17	10	Advanced to Knockout stage	—	3–3	1–0	10–0	—
2	Himalayan Kinnaur	4	2	2	0	13	3	+10	8	Advanced to Knockout stage	—	—	0–0	8–0	—
3	Real Kashmir	4	2	1	1	8	1	+7	7		—	—	—	1–0	7–0
4	Kumaon Heroes	4	1	0	3	1	19	−18	3		—	—	—	—	1–0
5	Real Lona FC	4	0	0	4	0	16	−16	0		0–6	0–2	—	—	—

Source: AIFF

=== Group G ===
All matches will be held in Bokaro.

Pos	Team	Pld	W	D	L	GF	GA	GD	Pts	Qualification	RAJ	KRFL	ADA Sarguja FA	SAIL Football Academy	MAD
1	Rajasthan United	4	3	0	1	13	4	+9	9 (Note: Head to head: KRFL 1–3 Rajasthan United)	Advanced to Knockout stage	—	—	—	1–2	—
2	KR Football Leaders	4	3	0	1	13	4	+9	9	Advanced to Knockout stage	1–3	—	4–1	—	7–0
3	Adani Sarguja FA	4	1	1	2	10	16	−6	4		0–7	—	—	—	4–4
4	SAIL Football Academy	4	2	0	2	4	7	−3	6		—	2–1	1–5	—	—
5	Madan Maharaj	4	0	1	3	5	14	−9	1		1–2	—	—	0–1	—

Source: AIFF

=== Group H ===
All matches will be held in Rudrapur.

Pos	Team	Pld	W	D	L	GF	GA	GD	Pts	Qualification	SUD	COR	CFA	LFSA
1	Sudeva Delhi	3	2	1	0	16	2	+14	7	Advanced to Knockout stage	—	1–1	—	—
2	Corbett	3	1	2	0	12	2	+10	5	Advanced to Knockout stage	—	—	1–1	—
3	Chandigarh FA	3	1	1	1	15	6	+9	4		1–5	—	—	13–0
4	Ladakh FS and A	3	0	0	3	0	33	−33	0		0–10	0–10	—	—

Source: AIFF

=== Group I ===
All matches will be held in Bhilai.

Pos	Team	Pld	W	D	L	GF	GA	GD	Pts	Qualification	MFA	CHE	PSFA	DRFA	RKM
1	Muthoot FA	4	3	1	0	8	2	+6	10	Advanced to Knockout stage	—	—	2–1	—	
2	Chennaiyin	4	3	0	1	13	5	+8	9	Advanced to Knockout stage	0–1	—	6–1	—	5–2
3	Premier Sporting FA	4	2	0	2	5	10	−5	6		—	—	—	2–1	2–1
4	The Diamond Rock FA	4	1	1	2	6	6	0	4		2–2	1–2	—	—	—
5	RKM FA	4	0	0	4	3	12	−9	0		—	—	—	0–2	—

Source: AIFF

=== Group J ===
All matches will be held in Goa.

Pos	Team	Pld	W	D	L	GF	GA	GD	Pts	Qualification	ZIN	BEN	ARA	GOA	CB
1	Zinc FA	4	4	0	0	12	0	+12	12	Advanced to Knockout stage	—	—	—	4–0	3–0
2	Bengaluru	4	2	0	2	10	5	+5	6		0–2	—	—	2–0	7–1
3	ARA	4	1	1	2	5	8	−3	4		0–3	2–1	—	—	—
4	Goa	4	1	1	2	6	9	−3	4		—	—	3–3	—	3–0
5	Churchill Brothers	4	1	0	3	2	13	−11	3		—	—	1–0	—	—

Source: AIFF

=== Ranking of second-placed teams ===
Due to Group H having lesser number of teams, the results against the fifth-placed teams in five-team groups are not considered for this ranking.

Pos	Grp	Team	Pld	W	D	L	GF	GA	GD	Pts	Qualification
1	I	Chennaiyin	3	2	0	1	8	3	+5	6	Advanced to Knockout stage
2	G	KR Football Leaders	3	2	0	1	6	4	+2	6	Advanced to Knockout stage
3	E	Gandhinagar FC	3	2	0	1	7	6	+1	6	Advanced to Knockout stage
4	C	Odisha	3	2	0	1	3	6	−3	6	Advanced to Knockout stage
5	H	Corbett FC	3	1	2	0	12	2	+10	5	Advanced to Knockout stage
6	F	Himalayan Kinnaur	3	1	2	0	11	3	+8	5	Advanced to Knockout stage
7	B	Football 4 Change Academy	3	1	1	1	8	3	+5	4	
8	D	East Bengal	3	1	1	1	2	1	+1	4	
9	A	Alchemy International FA	3	1	1	1	4	6	−2	4	
10	J	Bengaluru	3	1	0	2	3	4	−1	3	

First match(es) will be played: December 2022. Source: AIFF

== Knockout stage ==
=== Bracket ===
Round of 16
23 January – Deccan Arena, Hyderabad
Gandhinagar FC	1
Techtro Swades United	0
23 January – Deccan Arena, Hyderabad
Himalayan Kinnaur	2
Rajasthan United	1
23 January – Deccan Arena, Hyderabad
KR Football Leaders	2
Punjab FA	3
23 January – Deccan Arena, Hyderabad
Classic FA	1
Minerva Academy FC	0
24 January – Deccan Arena, Hyderabad
Sreenidi Deccan	0
Sudeva Delhi	2
24 January – Deccan Arena, Hyderabad
Corbett	0
Zinc FA	2
24 January – Deccan Arena, Hyderabad
Chennaiyin	2 (9)
Garhwal FC	2 (8)
24 January – Deccan Arena, Hyderabad
Odisha	1 (5)
Muthoot FA	1 (6)

Quarter-finals
25 January – Deccan Arena, Hyderabad
Gandhinagar FC	1 (4)
Himalayan Kinnaur	1 (5)
25 January – Deccan Arena, Hyderabad
Punjab FA	0
Classic FA	7
26 January – Deccan Arena, Hyderabad
Sudeva Delhi	2
Zinc FA	1
26 January – Deccan Arena, Hyderabad
Chennaiyin FC	3
Muthoot FA	0

Semi-finals
27 January – Deccan Arena, Hyderabad
Himalayan Kinnaur	1
Classic FA	3
28 January – Deccan Arena, Hyderabad
Sudeva Delhi	2 (8)
Chennaiyin FC	2 (7)

Final
31 January – Deccan Arena, Hyderabad
Classic FA	2
Sudeva Delhi	0

=== Round of 16 ===
23 January 2023
10:15 IST

Gandhinagar FC	1–0	Techtro Swades United
Wahengbam Mangal Singh 90+2'; Thounaojam Meiraba Singh (yellow card) 88'	Report	Lalfakzuala (yellow card) 47'

Deccan Arena, Hyderabad
Attendance: 25
Referee: Arvind Sekhar A

23 January 2023
15:15 IST

Himalayan Kinnaur	2–1	Rajasthan United
Mate Lamginmon Vaiphei 61', 71'; J Lalhmangaihzuala (yellow card) 71'	Report	Roman MRA (yellow card) 23'; Kenminthang Misao 79'

Deccan Arena, Hyderabad
Attendance: 60
Referee: S Samsonraj

23 January 2023
10:00 IST

KR Football Leaders	2–3	Punjab FA
Mahendra Bediya 21'; Uzair Khan 84'	Report	Gulraj Singh Buttar 30'; Karandeep Singh 52', 90+4'

Deccan Arena, Hyderabad
Attendance: 60
Referee: Syed Khaleel

23 January 2023
15:00 IST

Classic FA	1–0	Minerva Academy FC
Ningthoukhongjam Rishi Singh 60'	Report	Ngasham Bitan Singh (yellow card) 55'

Deccan Arena, Hyderabad
Attendance: 50
Referee: Nyayakappu Kurumaiah

24 January 2023
10:15 IST

Sreenidi Deccan	0–2	Sudeva Delhi
	Report	Arman Ahmed (yellow card) 61'; Jajo Prashant 76'; Haodamliam Vaiphei 88'

Deccan Arena, Hyderabad
Attendance: 55
Referee: Avind Sekhar A

24 January 2023
10:00 IST

Corbett	0–2	Zinc FA
	Report	Sanjay 34'; Shubhash Damor 88'

Deccan Arena, Hyderabad
Attendance: 50
Referee: Darshan M S

24 January 2023
15:15 IST

Chennaiyin	2–2	Garhwal
Makakmayum Daniyal 10'; Lalremruata 23'; Preyarhanjan RS (yellow card) 83'; Abitto A (yellow card) 90'	Report	Richie Kharbani 78'; Siddharth Khichi 88'
Penalties
	9–8

Deccan Arena, Hyderabad
Attendance: 50
Referee: Syed Khaleel

24 January 2023
15:00 IST

Odisha	1–1	Muthoot FA
Chintu Nag 35'	Report	Mohammed Samir 45+2'
Penalties
	5–6

Deccan Arena, Hyderabad
Attendance: 80
Referee: Nyayakappu Kurumaiah

=== Quarter-finals ===
25 January 2023
10:00 IST

Gandhinagar FC	1–1	Himalayan Kinnaur
Aaditya Pandya 47'; Yashir Khan (yellow card) 43' (yellow-red card) 48'; Rudra Patel (yellow card) 51'; Nelson Laishram (yellow card) 89'	Report	Christian Lalthuazala 11'
Penalties
	4–5

Deccan Arena, Hyderabad
Attendance: 50
Referee: S Samsonraj
25 January 2023
15:00 IST

Punjab FA	0–7	Classic FA
Harmanpreet Singh (yellow card) 32'; Mangal Singh (yellow card) 85'; Gulraj Buttar Singh (yellow card) 86'	Report	Gogocha Chungkham 8', 35', 52'; Mutum Anish Singh 16', 27'; Kullakpam Zahir Khan 40'; Punit Thangjam 72'

Deccan Arena, Hyderabad
Attendance: 55
Referee: M Sai Kumar
26 January 2023
10:00 IST

Sudeva Delhi	2–1	Zinc FA
Laltinlen Haokip 14'; Soibam Roshan Singh (yellow card) 57'; Ramesh Chhetri 82'; Farhan Fayaz (yellow card) 90+5'	Report	Ashish (yellow card) 56'; Mohammad Kaif 61'; Manish Meel (yellow card) 85'

Deccan Arena, Hyderabad
Attendance: 50
Referee: Arvind Sekhar A
26 January 2023
15:00 IST

Chennaiyin	3–0	Muthoot FA
Makakmayum Daniyal 41+1' (yellow card) 90+5'; Prakakdeswaran S 65' (yellow card) 89'; Lalthapuia 90+1'	Report

Deccan Arena, Hyderabad
Attendance: 80
Referee: Syed Khaleel

=== Semi-finals ===
27 January 2023
10:00 IST

Himalayan Kinnaur	1–3	Classic FA
Bhaskar Chhetri (yellow card) 25'; Christian Lalthazuala 51'	Report	Kullakpam Zahir Khan 40'; Gogocha Chungkham 47'; Mohmmad Arbash 48'

Deccan Arena, Hyderabad
Attendance: 50
Referee: S Samsonraj
28 January 2023
15:00 IST

Sudeva Delhi	2–2	Chennaiyin
Ramesh Chhetri 47', 73'	Report	Makakmayum Daniyal 39'; Srinith K 77'
Penalties
	8–7

Deccan Arena, Hyderabad
Attendance: 50
Referee: Syed Khaleel

=== Final ===
31 January 2023
TBD IST

Classic FA	2–0	Sudeva Delhi
Khulakpam Zahir Khan 14' (yellow card) 58'; Gogocha Chungkham 27'; Aheibam Suraj Singh (yellow card) 90+4'	Report	Sursing Purty (yellow card) 45+2'

Deccan Arena, Hyderabad
Attendance: 150
Referee: Arvind Sekhar A

== Statistics ==
=== Top scorers ===
As of 27 January 2023

Rank	Player	Club	Goals
1	Lemet Tangvah	Chandigarh FA	10
2	Christian Lalthazuala	Himalayan Kinnaur	8
2	Karandeep Singh	Punjab FA	8
3	Kishor Tiwari	Football 4 Change Academy	6
3	Subhash Damor	Zinc FA	6
3	Iashanbok Buhphang	Garhwal FC	6
5	Akash Tirkey	Minerva Academy	5
5	Takhellambam Likson Singh	Adani Sarguja FA	5
5	Pruthviraj Gosavi	Gandhinagar FC	5
5	Mate Lamginmon Vaiphei	Himalayan Kinnaur	5
5	Ramesh Chhetri	Sudeva	5
5	Mohammad Samir	Muthoot FA	5
5	Gogocha Chungkham	Classic FA	5
8	Tumto Komgo	Rajasthan United	4
8	Roshan Mongjam	Madan Maharaj	4
8	Likson Rebelo	Goa	4
8	Gerrard Dakerlang Sun	Alchemy International FA	4
8	Akash Kumar Munda	KR Football Leaders	4

=== Clean sheets ===
As of 6 January 2023

Rank	Player	Club	Clean sheets
1	Sahil Zulfikar	Zinc FA	4
1	Anubhav	Punjab FA	4
2	Junaid Hamid	Real Kashmir FC	3
2	Irom Devananada Meitei	Himalayan Kinnaur	3
2	Aheibam Suraj Singh	Classic FA	3

=== Hat-tricks ===
As of 6 January 2023

Rank	Player	Club	Hat-tricks
1	Iashanbok Buhphang	Garhwal FC	1 (vs Lakshadweep FA)
1	Gerrard Dakerlang Sun	Alchemy International FA	1 (vs Kenkre FC)
1	Karandeep Singh	Punjab FA	1 (vs Kumaon Heroes)
1	Pruthviraj Gosavi	Gandhinagar FC	1 (vs Mumbai City FC)
1	Kishor Tiwari	Football 4 Change Academy	1 (vs FAO Academy)
1	Omkar Talkar	Mumbai City FC	1 (vs Silvassa United FC)
1	Christian Lalthazuala	Himalayan FC	1 (vs Kumayou Heroes)
1	Takhellambam Likson Singh	Adani Sarguja FA	1 (vs Madan Maharaj FC)
1	Roshan Mongjam	Madan Maharaj FC	1 (vs Adani Sarguja FA)
1	Harsh Chhimwal	Corbett	1 (vs Ladakh Football School & Academy)
1	Nikhil Chand	Corbett	1 (vs Ladakh Football School & Academy)
1	Lemmet Tangvah	Chandigarh FA	1 (vs Ladakh Football School & Academy)
1	Likson Rebelo	FC Goa	1 (vs Churchill Brothers)
1	Subhash Damor	Zinc FA	1 (vs FC Goa)

== See also ==
- 2022–23 Indian Super League
- 2022–23 I-League
- 2022–23 I-League 2
- 2022–23 Indian State Leagues
