= Arkanun =

Medieval fantasy roleplaying game

- Cover art by Luciana Bacci and Flávio Correa
- Designers: Marcelo Del Debbio
- Illustrators: Luciana Bacci; Flávio Correa; Fábio Figueiredo; Evandro Gregório
- Publishers: Daemon Editora
- Publication: 1995
- Genres: Medieval fantasy

Arkanun, published in 1995, is the oldest fantasy role-playing game (RPG) in Brazil, and by the early years of the 21st century, was one of the most popular.

== Description ==
Arkanun is set in 14th-century medieval Europe, complete with The Inquisition, Templars, the Hundred Years' War, and the Black Death, as well as mages and witches (and the pyres to burn mages and witches), secret societies, and political power struggles.

Added to this are parallel dimensions, including Arkanun, where powerful mages have been corrupted by power, turning into demonic creatures that have opened portals to Earth. Some mages on Earth have been able to learn magic directly from the demons, but they too have become corrupted as a result. Realizing the danger, some mages and warriors — including the player characters — have vowed to protect Earth by fighting both the demons and the corrupt mages while avoiding the Inquisition, which will burn mages whether they are pure or corrupted.

=== Character creation ===
Using a point-buy system, players create either warriors or mages with eight attributes (four physical and four mental), special traits, and mastery points to enhance chosen talents. They can be human or other creatures. The character creation process can be shortened by using pregenerated character "kits".

=== Magic ===
Magic is considered a series of special talents. Magic points, obtained solely through special traits, allow the development of magical talents, which are obtained by combining one of the three forms of magic with at least one of the eleven paths of magic.

The three forms of magic are "Create," "Hear," and "Control." The eleven paths form three groups:

- six elemental paths: Fire, Water, Air, Earth, Light, Darkness
- three arcane paths of life: Animals, Plants, Humans
- two Dark Arcana: Spiritum and Arkanun.

The book includes 30 pages of spells.

=== Task resolution ===
Percentile dice are used for task resolution. To succeed, a roll must be less than or equal to the skill score required. In combat, attack and defence are opposed rolls, and damage can be reduced, but not negated, by physical or magical protection. "Hero points," obtained from special abilities, can be spent in place of lost hit points to avoid character death.

== Publication history ==
In 1992, Marcelo Del Debbio published a new role-playing system in the pages of the Brazilian fanzine Politreco. Three years later, Del Debbio created a new RPG using Daemon System called Arkanun, which was released in Brazil by Daemon Editora as an 80-page book in Portuguese with cover art by Luciana Bacci and Flávio Correa and interior art by Fábio Figueiredo and Evandro Gregório. A companion volume, Trevas, was released at the same time, the only difference between the two being that Arkanun is set in the medieval period while Trevas is set in the modern world. Daemon Editora also released Guia dos Jogadores (Player's Guide) and Guia da Europa Medieval (Guide to Medieval Europe). In the 2nd edition (1998) and 3rd edition (2000) of Arkanun, all three books were combined into one volume.

Arkanun/Trevas is the oldest Brazilian role-playing game still in print, and in 2009, it was the second-most played RPG in Brazil after Dungeons & Dragons. However, Leon Caldela, writing in 2006, pointed out "Here in Brazil, the 1990s saw a strong preference for the horror of World of Darkness and Arkanun — but nowadays, most players really prefer roleplaying as heroes."

== Reception ==
In Issue 11 of the French games magazine Backstab, Timbre Post was not impressed by this product, calling it "little more than a bargain-bin Ars Magica clone that poorly copies its magic system and offers only a few pages of background lore." Post concluded by giving this game a rating of only 4 out of 10, saying, "It is a quaint product thanks to the author's language, but far too conventional and stale to be truly interesting. A shame."

In the inaugural issue of the Brazilian RPG magazine Dragon Slayer, Rogério Saladino called Arkanun "one of the best RPG systems for handling realistic, investigative, mystery, and supernatural campaigns — games focused more on roleplaying than on combat."

In Issue 14 of the Brazilian RPG magazine Dragão Brasil, Grahal called it "a suspense-filled game, far removed from the glory and heroism of medieval fantasy. Here, life is tough!" Grahal also noted, "The author's writing style makes grasping the system a bit challenging, making the game better suited for more experienced Game Masters." Although Grahal felt some of the artwork was weak, special mention was made about "the excellent drawings by Fábio Figueiredo and Evandro Gregório, which make up the bulk of the book."

== Supplements ==
- Guia de Armas Medievais (Medieval Weapons Guide, 1998)
- Anjos: A Cidade de Prata (Angels: Silver City, 1998)
- Vampiros Mitológicos (Mythological Vampires, 1998)
- Demônios: A Divina Comédia (Demons: The Divine Comedy, 1999)
- Templários (Templars, 2000)
- Inquisição (Inquisition, 2000)
- Guia de Itens Mágicos vol. 1 & vol. 2 (Guide to Magical Items, 2001)
- Guia de Itens Mágicos vol. 2 (Guide to Magical Itens vol. 2, 2001)
- Guia de Monstros (Guide to Fantasy Monsters, 2001)
- Spiritum (2004)
