= Marcelo Pelé =

Brazilian footballer (born 1976)

Personal information
- Full name: Marcelo Corrêa Rosa
- Date of birth: 9 November 1976 (age 50)
- Place of birth: Vila Velha, Brazil
- Height: 1.73 m (5 ft 8 in)
- Position: Forward

Senior career*
Years	Team	Apps	(Gls)
1997–1998	Linhares		
1998–1999	São Mateus		
2000	Vilavelhense		
2000–2002	Estrela do Norte		
2002	Canoinhas-SC		
2003–2004	Estrela do Norte		
2004	Serra		
2005	Estrela do Norte		
2005	Villa Nova		
2006	Democrata-SL		
2006	Atlético Mineiro		
2006	Araxá		
2007	Desportiva		
2007	Jaguaré		
2008	Guarani-MG		
2008	Rio Branco-SP		
2009	São Mateus		
2009	Rio Branco-ES		
2010–2011	São Mateus		
2011	Vitória-ES		
2012	São Mateus		
2013–2014	Estrela do Norte		
- * Club domestic league appearances and goals as of 11 March 2024

Marcelo Corrêa Rosa (born 9 November 1976), better known as Marcelo Pelé, is a Brazilian former professional footballer who played as a forward.

== Career ==
Born in Vila Velha, Marcelo Pelé stood out particularly in football in Espírito Santo, where he was top scorer and champion on several occasions, and in Minas Gerais, where he was top scorer in the state for the Democrata of Sete Lagoas and champion of the 2006 Campeonato Brasileiro Série B with Atlético Mineiro.

== Personal life ==
Marcelo Pelé is father of the also footballers Marcelinho and Jhon Jhon.

== Honours ==
Linhares

- Campeonato Capixaba: 1997, 1998

Serra

- Campeonato Capixaba: 2004

Atlético Mineiro

- Campeonato Brasileiro Série B: 2006

São Mateus

- Campeonato Capixaba: 2011
- Campeonato Capixaba Série B: 2009

Estrela do Norte

- Campeonato Capixaba: 2014

Individual

- 2006 Campeonato Mineiro top scorer: 9 goals
- 2007 Campeonato Capixaba top scorer: 12 goals
- 2011 Campeonato Capixaba top scorer: 11 goals
