= Marcelinho (footballer, born April 1998) =

Brazilian footballer

Personal information
- Full name: Marcelo dos Santos Rosa
- Date of birth: 2 April 1998 (age 28)
- Place of birth: Vitória, Brazil
- Height: 1.73 m (5 ft 8 in)
- Position: Winger

Youth career
- 2011–2017: Athletico Paranaense

Senior career*
Years	Team	Apps	(Gls)
2016–2019	Athletico Paranaense		
2019	→ Toledo (loan)		
2019	→ Vitória-ES (loan)		
2020	Luverdense		
2021	Rio Branco-PR		
2021	Aster		
2022	Próspera		
2022	Atlético Cearense		
2023	Tupynambás		
2023–2024	Paredes		
2025–	Patriotas		
- * Club domestic league appearances and goals as of 30 September 2025

Marcelo dos Santos Rosa (born 2 April 1998), better known as Marcelinho, is a Brazilian professional footballer who plays as a winger for USC Paredes.

== Career ==
An ambidextrous winger, Marcelinho was revealed in the youth categories of Athletico Paranaense, also playing professionally in some games and being part of the state champion squad and the 2018 Copa Sudamericana. The following season he ended up on loan but without being able to establish himself, he was sold, later playing for teams such as Luverdense, Próspera and Atlético Cearense. In August 2023 it was presented by USC Paredes of Portugal.

In September 2025, Marcelinho was announced by Patriotas FC.

== Personal life ==
Marcelinho is brother of the also footballer Jhon Jhon, and son of Marcelo Pelé.

== Honours ==
Athletico Paranaense

- Copa Sudamericana: 2018
- Campeonato Paranaense: 2018
