= Marcelo (footballer, born 1998) =

Brazilian footballer

Personal information
- Full name: Marcelo de Souza dos Santos Júnior
- Date of birth: 17 January 1998 (age 28)
- Place of birth: Ribeirão Preto, Brazil
- Height: 1.79 m (5 ft 10 in)
- Position: Forward

Team information
- Current team: Paraná (on loan from Cruzeiro)

Youth career
- 2012–2018: Cruzeiro
- 2016: → Ponte Preta (loan)

Senior career*
| Years | Team | Apps | (Gls) |
| 2018– | Cruzeiro | 3 | (0) |
| 2019 | → Ipatinga (loan) | 0 | (0) |
| 2019 | → Vitória (loan) | 0 | (0) |
| 2020– | → Paraná (loan) | 0 | (0) |
- * Club domestic league appearances and goals as of 20:31, 29 May 2019 (UTC)

Marcelo de Souza dos Santos Júnior (born 17 January 1998), commonly known as Marcelo or Juninho, is a Brazilian footballer who currently plays as a midfielder for Paraná, on loan from Cruzeiro.

== Career statistics ==
=== Club ===
As of 29 May 2019.

| Club | Season | League | | | State League | | Cup | | Continental | | Other | | Total | |
| Club | Season | Division | Apps | Goals | Apps | Goals | Apps | Goals | Apps | Goals | Apps | Goals | Apps | Goals |
|---|---|---|---|---|---|---|---|---|---|---|---|---|---|---|
| Cruzeiro | 2018 | Série A | 3 | 0 | 1 (Note: Appearances in the Campeonato Mineiro) | 0 | 0 | 0 | 0 | 0 | 0 | 0 | 4 | 0 |
| Cruzeiro | 2019 | Série A | 0 | 0 | 0 | 0 | 0 | 0 | 0 | 0 | 0 | 0 | 0 | 0 |
| Cruzeiro | Total | | 2 | 0 | 0 | 0 | 0 | 0 | 0 | 0 | 0 | 0 | 2 | 0 |
| Ipatinga (loan) | 2019 | – | | | 4 (Note: Appearances in the Campeonato Mineiro Module II) | 0 | 0 | 0 | – | | 0 | 0 | 4 | 0 |
| Vitória (loan) | 2019 | Série B | 0 | 0 | 0 | 0 | 0 | 0 | – | | 0 | 0 | 0 | 0 |
| Career total | | | 3 | 0 | 5 | 0 | 0 | 0 | 0 | 0 | 0 | 0 | 8 | 0 |
