= Vinícius Jaú =

Brazilian footballer

Personal information
- Full name: Vinícius de Lima Ferreira
- Date of birth: 3 April 1998 (age 28)
- Place of birth: Jaú, São Paulo, Brazil
- Height: 1.75 m (5 ft 9 in)
- Position: Forward

Team information
- Current team: Londrina (on loan from Avaí)

Youth career
- 2012–2016: Atlético Paranaense
- 2016–2017: Benfica

Senior career*
Years	Team	Apps	(Gls)
2017–2020	Benfica B	9	(0)
2020–	Avaí	21	(0)
2022	→ Ituano (loan)	11	(1)
2023–	→ Xv De Jaú (loan)	0	(0)
- * Club domestic league appearances and goals as of 18:09, 1 January 2021 (UTC)

Vinícius de Lima Ferreira (born 3 April 1998), also known as Vinícius Jaú, is a Brazilian professional footballer who plays as a forward for Xv de Jaú, on loan from Avaí.

== Career ==
Born in Jaú, São Paulo, Vinícius made his professional debut with Portuguese team Benfica B in a 2–1 away loss to Oliveirense in LigaPro on 8 August 2018.

On 6 February 2020, Vinícius returned to Brazil and joined Avaí FC.

== Honours ==
Benfica

- UEFA Youth League runner-up: 2016–17
