= Rakesh Pradhan =

Indian footballer

Personal information
- Full name: Rakesh Pradhan
- Date of birth: 2 August 1993 (age 33)
- Place of birth: Assam, India
- Height: 1.70 m (5 ft 7 in)
- Position: Full back

Team information
- Current team: Bengaluru United

Youth career
- 2013–2017: Shillong Lajong

Senior career*
Years	Team	Apps	(Gls)
2017–2019	Shillong Lajong	31	(1)
2019–2021	NorthEast United	16	(0)
2020	→ Odisha (loan)	8	(0)
2021–2022	Mohammedan	0	(0)
2022	→ Sudeva Delhi (loan)	10	(0)
2022–	Bengaluru United	0	(0)
- * Club domestic league appearances and goals as of 16:26, 1 July 2022 (UTC) ‡ National team caps and goals as of 8 January 2020

Rakesh Pradhan (born 2 August 1993), is an Indian professional footballer who plays as a defender for I-League 2nd Division club Bengaluru United.

== Career ==
Born in Assam, Pradhan is a product of the Shillong Lajong academy. While still a regular with the academy set-up, Pradhan made his first appearances for the Shillong Lajong first team during the 2013–14 I-League. Pradhan appeared on the bench on three occasions, against Dempo, Pune, and East Bengal, but didn't see any time on the pitch.

More than four years later, prior to the 2017–18 season, Pradhan was added to the Shillong Lajong first team for the I-League. He then made his professional debut for the club in their opening match against Gokulam Kerala. Pradhan started and played the whole match as Shillong Lajong won 1–0. At the end of the season, Pradhan had played and started in all 18 of Shillong Lajong's matches during the I-League season.

On 4 April 2018, Pradhan scored his first professional goal against Pune City in the Super Cup. His goal in the 61st minute was the equalizer as Shillong Lajong came back from being 0–2 down to winning 3–2.

On 18 January 2021, Pradhan was signed by Odisha FC on loan from NorthEast United & made his debut for the new club on 19 January against Hyderabad FC.

== Career statistics ==
As of 20 May 2021

Club	Season	League			Cup		Continental		Total	
Club	Season	Division	Apps	Goals	Apps	Goals	Apps	Goals	Apps	Goals
Shillong Lajong	2017–18	I-League	18	0	1	1	—	—	19	1
Shillong Lajong	2018–19	I-League	13	1	0	0	—	—	13	1
NorthEast United	2019–20	Indian Super League	15	0	0	0	—	—	15	0
NorthEast United	2020-21	Indian Super League	1	0	0	0	__	__	0	0
Odisha FC (loan)	2020-21	Indian Super League	8	0	0	0	__	__	8	0
Career total			48	1	1	1	0	0	48	2
