= Samuel Lalmuanpuia =

Indian footballer (born 1998)

Personal information
- Date of birth: 27 July 1998 (age 28)
- Place of birth: Mizoram, India
- Height: 1.72 m (5 ft 7 1/2 in)
- Positions: Attacking midfielder; forward

Team information
- Current team: Diamond Harbour
- Number: 37

Youth career
- Shillong Lajong

Senior career*
Years	Team	Apps	(Gls)
2015–2019	Shillong Lajong	59	(10)
2019	→ Minerva Punjab (loan)		
2019–2020	Kerala Blasters	5	(0)
2020–2021	Odisha	3	(0)
2021	ATK Mohun Bagan		
2021–2022	Odisha		
2022	→ Aizawl (loan)	13	(1)
2022–2023	RoundGlass Punjab	8	(1)
2023–2024	Mohammedan	11	(2)
2024–2025	Aizawl	14	(2)
2025–	Diamond Harbour		
- * Club domestic league appearances and goals as of 5 April 2025

Samuel Lalmuanpuia (born 27 July 1998) is an Indian professional footballer who plays as a forward for Diamond Harbour.

== Career ==
Born in Mizoram, Lalmuanpuia began his career with Shillong Lajong. He represented Lajong's youth side in the Shillong Premier League, where he was top scorer in 2015, and the I-League U19. He made his professional debut for the club on 21 February 2016 against DSK Shivajians. He started the match and played the entire first half as Shillong Lajong were held to a draw, 1–1.

He has also represented Minerva FC in 2019 AFC Cup and has scored a goal in the tournament.

=== Diamond Harbour ===
On 17 July 2025, Lalmuanpuia officially joined Diamond Harbour, signing a contract ahead of the 2025–26 I-League season.

== Career statistics ==
=== Club ===
As of 28 July 2025

Club	Season	League			Cup		AFC		Total	
Club	Season	Division	Apps	Goals	Apps	Goals	Apps	Goals	Apps	Goals
Shillong Lajong	2015–16	I-League	9	1	0	0	—		9	1
Shillong Lajong	2016–17	I-League	16	3	3 (Note: Appearance(s) in Federation Cup)	2	—		19	5
Shillong Lajong	2017–18	I-League	17	3	2 (Note: Appearance(s) in Super Cup)	1	—		19	4
Shillong Lajong	2018–19	I-League	17	3	0	0	—		17	3
Shillong Lajong	Total		59	10	5	3	0	0	64	13
Minerva Punjab (loan)	2018–19	I-League	0	0	—		6 (Note: Appearance(s) in AFC Cup)	1	6	1
Kerala Blasters	2019–20	Indian Super League	5	0	0	0	—		5	0
Odisha	2020–21	Indian Super League	3	0	0	0	—		3	0
ATK Mohun Bagan	2020–21	Indian Super League	0	0	0	0	—		0	0
Odisha	2021–22	Indian Super League	0	0	0	0	—		0	0
Aizawl (loan)	2021–22	I-League	13	1	0	0	—		13	1
RoundGlass Punjab	2022–23	I-League	8	1	0	0	—		8	1
Mohammedan	2023–24	I-League	11	2	0	0	—		11	2
Aizawl	2024–25	I-League	14	2	0	0	—		14	2
Diamond Harbour	2025–26	I-League	0	0	1 (Note: Appearance(s) in Durand Cup)	0	—		1	0
Career total			113	16	6	3	6	1	125	20

== Honours ==
Shillong Lajong

- Shillong Premier League: 2015

Kerala Blasters B

- Kerala Premier League: 2019–20: Champions

Individual

- I-League Best Emerging Player: 2017–18
