= Marcelo Del Debbio =

Brazilian writer

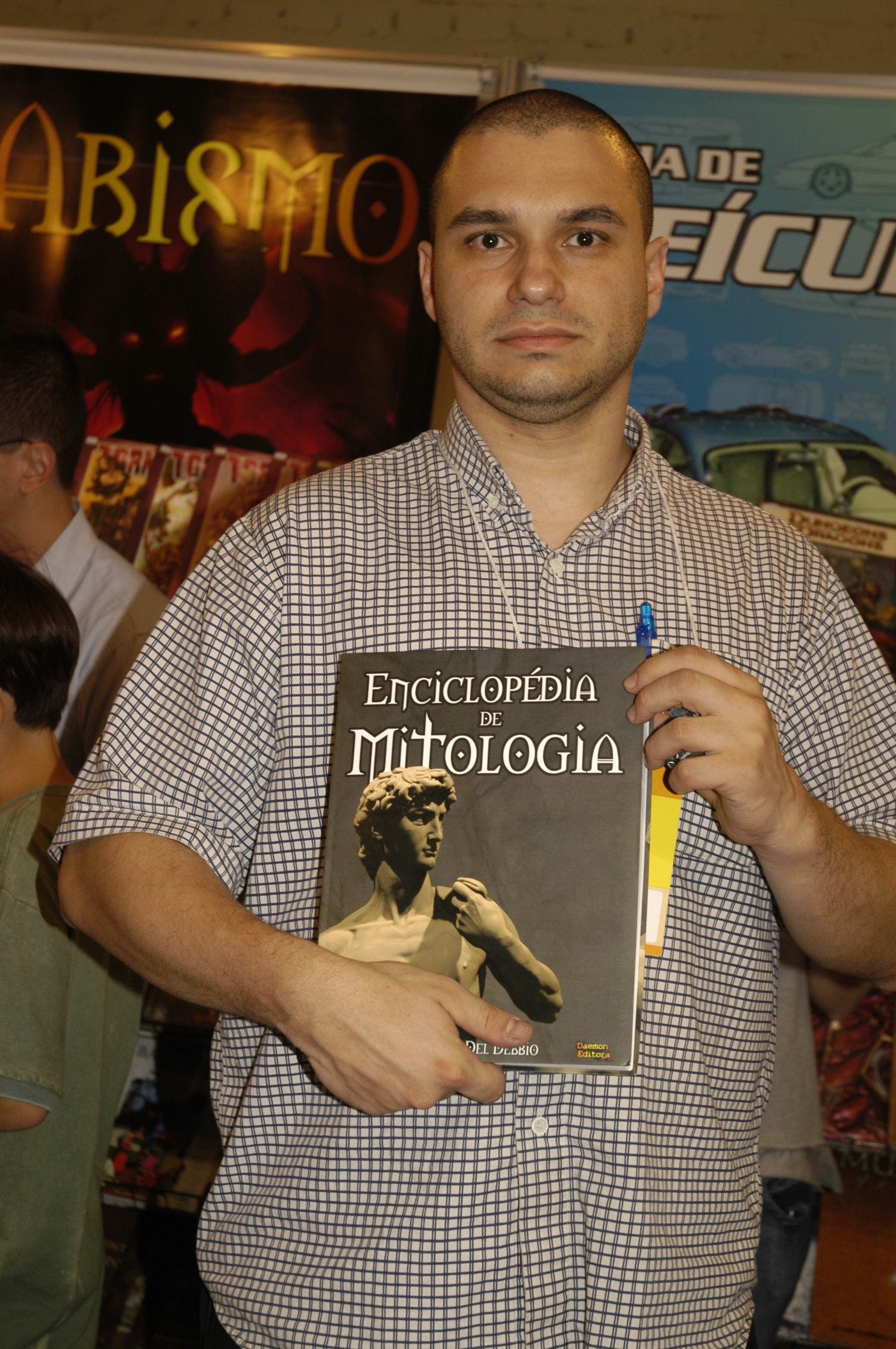
- Brazilian writer Marcelo Del Debbio
- Born: September 9, 1974 (age 52); São Paulo, Brazil
- Occupations: Architect, novelist, RPG writer
- Writing career
- Genres: Fantasy, science fiction, fiction, non-fiction, superhero, horror
- Subjects: Mythology, Hermetism, role-playing game
- Notable works: Enciclopédia de Mitologia; Arkanun; Trevas; Hermetic Kabbalah Tarot; RPGQuest
- Notable awards: Best Brazilian RPG 1996
- Website: deldebbio.com.br

Marcelo Del Debbio (born September 9, 1974) is a Brazilian architect (graduated from FAU-USP) and writer, with specialization in semiotics, history of art and world religions, best known from his several works in role-playing games, comparative mythology, comparative religion, esoteric and masonic texts.

== Early life ==
Del Debbio was born and lived in São Paulo his entire childhood. His interest in Mythology and compared religions began early in his life. Playing Dungeons & Dragons since 1984, he became one of Brazil's first game developers, writing small articles for school papers, and later for University press. He began his career in 1992, writing short texts and essays for role playing magazines (Dragão Brazil, d20 Saga, RPGMagazine, Dragon Magazine and Só Aventuras). He has published over 200 articles in horror and fantasy, as well as short stories and related texts.

With the engineer Norson Botrel, he created the Daemon System. In 1998, he began working for Daemon Publisher House. In 2005, he created a system called RPGQuest, for using RPG in schools and educational programs, as well as a simple method of introducing role playing games to children.

He also has worked in mythology, such as his book Enciclopédia de Mitologia, with over 7200 entries, considered one of the most complete reference books about mythology in Portuguese.

== Small Churches, Big Business ==
In 2014 he began one of Brazils most controversials crowdfunding projects, called Pequenas Igrejas, Grandes Negócios ("Small Churches, Big Business"). Pequenas Igrejas, Grandes Negócios (PIGN) is a cardgame of "science fiction" set in a world where Evangelical churches are used by unscrupulous and misleading people to launder money from crime, sell useless crap, and explore the good faith of ignorant people, as well as obtain political power; a universe very different from our reality, where churches are community centers, managed by "bastions of good though".

This satirical cardgame emulates the Brazilian neo-Pentecostal religious background. In PIGN, each player (2 to 7 players, and can have up to 14 players with expansions) will lead a pastor and a church, which will give you special powers and resources, in a contest to see who can get richer and destroy the reputation of other pastors faster. WINS the player who survive with less reputation tarnished on the day of the Rapture!. In 60 days, he gathered over US$40k and the total project arrived at US$90k. The name of the game is a pun with Brazil's most important business magazine, called Pequenas Empresas & Grandes Negócios ("Small Enterprises & Big Business").

The project was mentioned even in the Non-Prophets Radio, an American atheist radio program.

== Works ==
Some of his works include: Arkanun (1995) Won Best Brazilian RPG in 1996, Grimório (1996), Trevas (1996), Guia de Armas (1997) (Norson Botrel), Guia de Armas Medievais (1998) (with Norson Botrel), Anjos: A Cidade de Prata (1998), Vampiros Mitológicos (1998), Demônios: A Divina Comédia (1999), Arkanun 2ª Edição (2000), Templários (2000), Inquisição (2000), Clube de Caça (2000) (with J. M. Trevisan), Guia de Itens Mágicos vol. 1 (2001) (with Norson Botrel), Guia de Itens Mágicos vol. 2 (2001) (with Norson Botrel), Invasão (2001) (with Marcelo Cassaro), Guia de Monstros (2001) (with Marcelo Cassaro), Principia Discordia (2002), Anime RPG (2003) (with Luciana Bacci), Spiritum (2004), Supers (2004), Hi-Brazil (2004), RPGQuest: Nova Arcádia (2005), RPGQuest 2: Velha Arcádia (2005), RPGQuest 3: Templários (2005), RPGQuest 4: Aventuras Orientais (2005), RPGQuest Módulo Básico (2006).
