= Mohammad Sajid Dhot =

Indian footballer

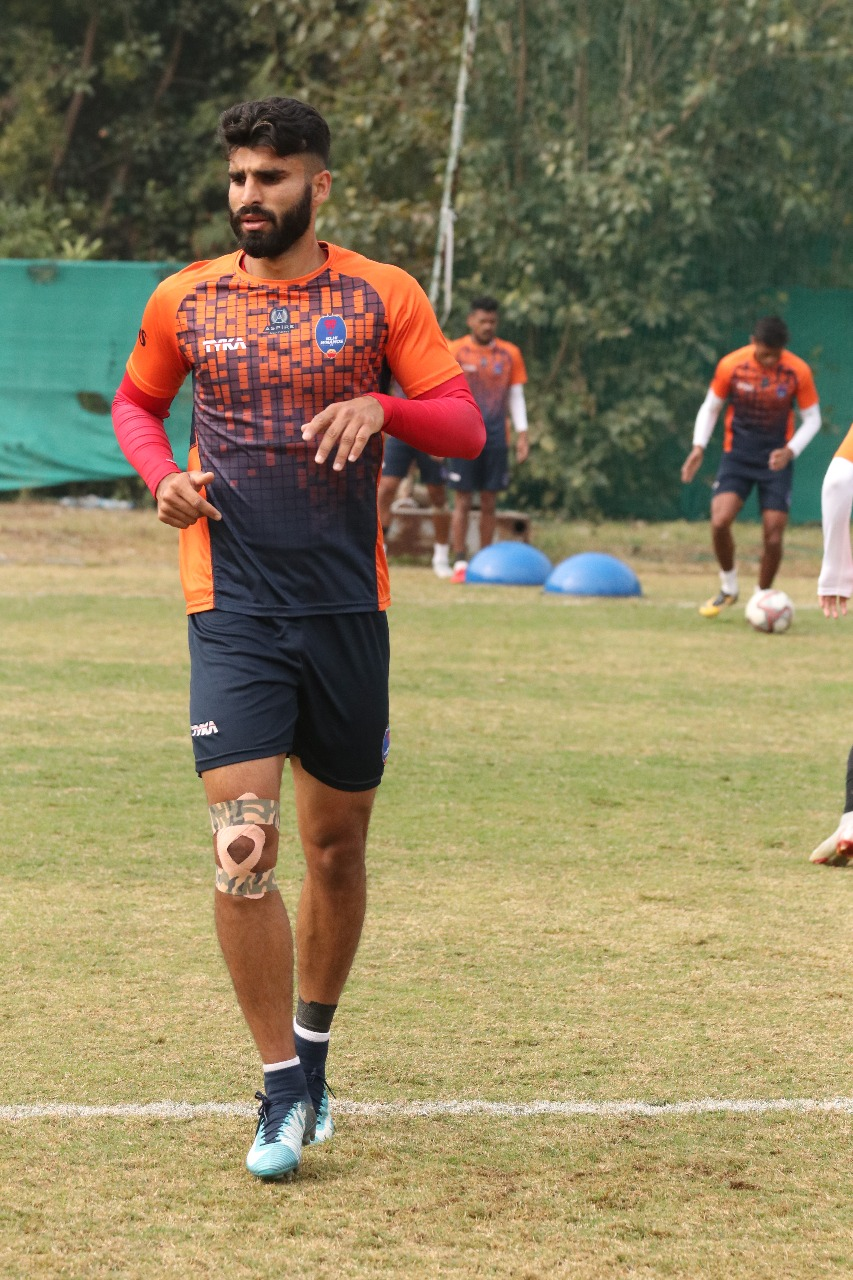
- Dhot with Delhi Dynamos in 2018

Personal information
- Full name: Mohammad Sajid Dhot
- Date of birth: 10 December 1997 (age 28)
- Place of birth: Malerkotla, Punjab, India
- Height: 1.82 m (5 ft 11 1/2 in)
- Position: Centre-back

Team information
- Current team: Namdhari
- Number: 36

Youth career
- 2007–2009: St Stephen's Football Academy
- 2010–2012: IMG Academy
- 2013–2015: AIFF Elite Academy

Senior career*
Years	Team	Apps	(Gls)
2016–2017	DSK Shivajians	4	(0)
2017–2021	Odisha	23	(0)
2022–2023	Chennaiyin	7	(1)
2023–2025	Sreenidi Deccan	20	(0)
2025	Downtown Heroes	0	(0)
2026–	Namdhari	1	(0)

International career^{‡}
2019–2010	India U13	4	(0)
2010–2011	India U14	4	(0)
2011–2012	India U17	12	(0)
2013–2014	India U19	7	(0)
2018–	India	1	(0)
- * Club domestic league appearances and goals as of 18:54, 19 March 2026 (UTC) ‡ National team caps and goals as of 3 January 2022

Mohammad Sajid Dhot (born 10 December 1997) is an Indian professional footballer who plays as a defender for Indian Football League club Namdhari.

== Career ==
=== Early career ===
Born in Malerkotla, Punjab, Dhot started his footballing career at the St. Stephen's Football Academy Chandigarh, under the coaching of Harjinder Singh. Dhot eventually, along with the rest of the India under-17 side, moved to the United States to train at the IMG Academy for a year. While in the US, Dhot played in tournaments such as the IMG Cup and the Dallas Cup. After returning to India, Dhot joined the AIFF Elite Academy and played for the side in the I-League U19.

=== DSK Shivajians ===
Before the 2015–16 I-League, Dhot signed for the newly promoted side DSK Shivajians. He made his professional debut for the side on 14 February 2016 against Salgaocar.

== International ==
Dhot was part of the India under-13 and under-14 sides that took part in the AFC football festivals. His performance during the festival helped Dhot earn his year abroad in the United States. Dhot soon represented India at the under-16 level. Dhot has also represented India at the under-19 level.

== Career statistics ==
=== Club ===
As of 12 November 2022

Club	Season	League			Cup		AFC		Total	
Club	Season	Division	Apps	Goals	Apps	Goals	Apps	Goals	Apps	Goals
DSK Shivajians	2015–16	I-League	2	0	0	0	—		2	0
DSK Shivajians	2016–17	I-League	2	0	2 (Note: Appearance(s) in Federation Cup)	0	—		4	0
DSK Shivajians	Total		4	0	2	0	0	0	6	0
Odisha	2017–18	Indian Super League	7	0	1 (Note: Appearance(s) in Super Cup)	0	—		8	0
Odisha	2018–19	Indian Super League	6	0	1	1	—		7	1
Odisha	2019–20	Indian Super League	4	0	0	0	—		4	0
Odisha	2020–21	Indian Super League	6	0	0	0	—		6	0
Odisha	Total		23	0	2	1	0	0	25	1
Chennaiyin	2021–22	Indian Super League	6	1	0	0	—		6	1
Chennaiyin	2022–23	Indian Super League	1	0	2 (Note: Appearance(s) in Durand Cup)	0	—		3	0
Chennaiyin	Total		7	1	2	0	0	0	9	1
Sreenidi Deccan	2023–24	I-League	0	0	0	0	—		0	0
Career total			34	1	6	1	0	0	40	2

=== International career ===
India9 National Team
Team Name	Year	Apps	Goals
India U-13	2009–10	4	0
India U-14	2010–11	4	0
India U-16	2011–12	7	0
India U-19	2013–15	5	0
India	2018–	1	0

== Honours ==
India

- SAFF Championship runner-up: 2018
