= Paul Ramfangzauva =

Indian footballer

Personal information
- Full name: Paul Ramfangzauva Hmar
- Date of birth: 26 March 1999 (age 27)
- Place of birth: Mizoram, India
- Height: 1.78 m (5 ft 10 in)
- Position: Central midfielder

Team information
- Current team: Kerala Blasters

Youth career
- –2018: Aizawl U18

Senior career*
| Years | Team | Apps | (Gls) |
| 2018–2020 | Aizawl | 32 | (2) |
| 2020–2025 | Odisha | 20 | (3) |
| 2025 | Chanmari | 11 | (5) |
| 2025–2026 | Diamond Harbour | | |
| 2026– | Kerala Blasters | 1 | (0) |
- * Club domestic league appearances and goals as of 11 October 2026

Paul Ramfangzauva Hmar (born 26 March 1999) is an Indian professional footballer who plays as a central midfielder for Indian Super League club Kerala Blasters.

== Club career ==
Born in Mizoram, India Paul made his senior debut with I-League side Aizawl, in the 2018–19 season. He earlier was the part of the Aizawl F.C. U-18. On 24 June 2020 he joined Indian Super League club Odisha. He appeared in 20 Hero Indian Super League games for Odisha FC, scoring three goals Paul was signed by Kerala Blasters in October 2026. He made his debut for the club on 11 October 2026 against Inter Kashi FC in a 2–0 victory.

== Career statistics ==
=== Club ===
As of 25 April 2025

| Club | Season | League | | | Cup | | AFC | | Total | |
| Club | Season | Division | Apps | Goals | Apps | Goals | Apps | Goals | Apps | Goals |
|---|---|---|---|---|---|---|---|---|---|---|
| Aizawl | 2018–19 | I-League | 17 | 1 | 0 | 0 | – | | 17 | 1 |
| Aizawl | 2019–20 | I-League | 15 | 1 | 0 | 0 | – | | 15 | 1 |
| Aizawl | Total | | 32 | 2 | 0 | 0 | 0 | 0 | 32 | 2 |
| Odisha | 2020–21 | Indian Super League | 5 | 2 | 0 | 0 | – | | 5 | 2 |
| Odisha | 2021–22 | Indian Super League | 13 | 1 | 0 | 0 | – | | 13 | 1 |
| Odisha | 2022–23 | Indian Super League | 2 | 0 | 7 (Note: Appearance(s) in Durand Cup) (Note: Appearance(s) in Super Cup) | 0 | 1 (Note: Appearance in playoff for AFC Cup group stage) | 0 | 10 | 0 |
| Odisha | 2023–24 | Indian Super League | 0 | 0 | 0 | 0 | – | | 0 | 0 |
| Odisha | Total | | 20 | 3 | 7 | 0 | 1 | 0 | 28 | 3 |
| Chanmari | 2024–25 | I-League 2 | 11 | 5 | 0 | 0 | – | | 11 | 5 |
| Diamond Harbour | 2025–26 | I-League | 0 | 0 | 0 | 0 | – | | 0 | 0 |
| Career total | | | 63 | 10 | 7 | 0 | 1 | 0 | 71 | 10 |
