= Marcelinho (footballer, born September 1978) =

Brazilian footballer

Personal information
- Full name: Marcelo Henrique de Aguiar Quarterole
- Date of birth: 28 September 1978 (age 48)
- Place of birth: Rio de Janeiro, Brazil
- Height: 1.71 m (5 ft 7 in)
- Position: Striker

Senior career*
Years	Team	Apps	(Gls)
2000–2009	Cabofriense		
2005–2006	→ Botafogo (loan)		
2007	→ Náutico (loan)		
2008	→ União Leiria (loan)		
2008	→ Paraná (loan)		
2009–2010	Santa Cruz		
2009	→ Campinense (loan)		
2011	Campinense		
2012–2013	Operário de Ponta Grossa		
2013	Baraúnas		
2014–2016	America		

Managerial career
- 2020: Desportiva Ferroviária
- * Club domestic league appearances and goals as of 18:56, 13 March 2008 (UTC)

Marcelo Henrique de Aguiar Quarterole (born 28 September 1978), known as Marcelinho, is a Brazilian professional football coach and former player who played as a striker.

== Career ==
He was on loan to Botafogo in 2005 and 2006 Brazilian football season.

He was loaned out again at Náutico on 27 April 2007.

In January 2008, he signed a new contract with Cabofriense, last until June 2009, but he was then on loan to U.D. Leiria until June 2008.

He then loaned to Paraná at Campeonato Brasileiro Série B 2008.

In July 2009, he signed a one-year deal with Santa Cruz and in August 2009 he joined Campinense on loan until the end of season.

He joined Campinense on free transfer after his contract with Santa Cruz expired in December 2010.
