= Hendry Antonay =

Indian footballer (born 2000)

Personal information
- Full name: Hendry Antonay
- Date of birth: 22 May 2000 (age 26)
- Place of birth: Austin Town, Bengaluru, Karnataka, India
- Height: 1.70 m (5 ft 7 in)
- Position: Right-back

Team information
- Current team: Thrissur Magic

Youth career
- AIFF Elite

Senior career*
Years	Team	Apps	(Gls)
2018	Chennaiyin B	15	(0)
2018–2020	Chennaiyin	0	(0)
2019–2020	→ Indian Arrows (loan)	8	(0)
2020–2024	Odisha	11	(0)
2024-	Thrissur Magic	0	(0)

International career
2017	India U-17	1	(0)
- * Club domestic league appearances and goals as of 12:13, 18 December 2020 (UTC)

Hendry Antonay (born 22 May 2000) is an Indian footballer who plays as a defender for Indian club Thrissur Magic in the Super League Kerala. He represented India in the 2017 FIFA U-17 World Cup.

== Club career ==
Born in Karnataka, Antonay made his senior debut with Indian Super League side Chennaiyin and has also represented Chennaiyin B particularly in I-League II. He captained Chennaiyin FC B in the Durand Cup.

=== Indian Arrows ===
In 2019, Antonay was loaned from Chennaiyin FC to Indian Arrows. On 6 December 2020, he made his debut for I-League side Indian Arrows against Gokulam Kerala FC. He came on as a 75th-minute substitute for the Ajin Tom as the match ended in 0–1 victory for Gokulam Kerala.

=== Odisha ===
On 5 June 2020, Antonay joined Indian Super League club Odisha FC. On 23 November 2020, Antonay made his debut for Indian super league side Odisha against Hyderabad FC.The match ended in a 0–1 victory for Hyderabad FC.

=== Thrissur Magic ===
On 6 September 2024, Antonay joined Super League Kerala side Thrissur Magic.

== International career ==
Antonay has represented India U-17. He was in the squad for FIFA U-17 World Cup in India. He has maiden appearance of it.

== Career statistics ==
=== Club ===
As of match played 11 December 2020

Club	Season	League			Cup		Continental		Total	
Club	Season	Division	Apps	Goals	Apps	Goals	Apps	Goals	Apps	Goals
Indian Arrows	2019–20	I-League	12	0	0	0	—	—	12	0
Odisha FC	2020–21	Indian Super League	11	0	0	0	—	—	11	0
Career total			23	0	0	0	0	0	23	0
