= Jacob Tratt =

Australian soccer player (born 1994)

Personal information
- Full name: Jacob Tratt
- Date of birth: 14 September 1994 (age 32)
- Place of birth: Dubbo, Australia
- Height: 1.90 m (6 ft 3 in)
- Positions: Centre back; right back

Team information
- Current team: Oakleigh Cannons
- Number: 5

Youth career
- Western NSW Panthers
- Sutherland Sharks
- 2013–2015: Sydney FC

Senior career*
Years	Team	Apps	(Gls)
2013–2015	Sutherland Sharks	44	(3)
2015–2016	Sydney FC	0	(0)
2016	Sydney United 58	17	(2)
2016–2017	Wellington Phoenix	20	(1)
2017	Wellington Phoenix Reserves	1	(0)
2018	Sutherland Sharks	21	(2)
2018–2019	Sydney FC	9	(2)
2019–2020	Perth Glory	15	(0)
2020–2021	Odisha	17	(0)
2021–2022	Adelaide United	14	(0)
2022–2024	Western United	24	(1)
2024–	Oakleigh Cannons	1	(0)
- * Club domestic league appearances and goals as of 10 May 2024

Jacob Tratt (born 14 September 1994) is an Australian professional footballer who plays as a centre back for Oakleigh Cannons.

== Club career ==
=== Junior year ===
Tratt played his junior football with Western NSW Panthers. He also captained Sydney FC to the 2013–14 A-League National Youth League title.

=== Sydney FC ===
Tratt signed a one-year A-League deal with Sydney FC for the 2015–16 season.

=== Sydney United 58 ===
He left Sydney FC at the end of the season, signing with Sydney United in the National Premier Leagues NSW.

=== Wellington Phoenix ===
Tratt returned to the A-League in September 2016, signing a one-year deal with Wellington Phoenix.

During his time at the Phoenix, Tratt made 20 appearances, starting every match of the season until he picked up an injury. He scored his first A-League goal against Melbourne Victory on 17 January 2017. Tratt left the club in April 2017, citing "personal and family reasons".

=== Return to Sydney FC ===
Tratt signed an injury replacement contract with Sydney FC in November 2018 after Ben Warland suffered a foot injury. He was a cult favourite at Sydney after he scored on debut against Western Sydney Wanderers, and scored the winning goal against Adelaide United.

=== Perth Glory ===
In July 2019, Tratt joined Perth Glory on a one-year deal. He scored a header in his debut match against Bayswater City, helping the team win the match 3–0.

=== Odisha FC ===
In September 2020, Tratt penned down a one-year deal with Indian Super League side Odisha FC. He appeared in 17 matches for Odisha as they finished at the bottom of the table.

=== Adelaide United ===
On the 6 August 2021, it was announced that Tratt was returning to the A-League after signing a one-year deal with Adelaide United.

== Career statistics ==
As of 1 November 2022

Appearances and goals by club, season and competition
Club	Season	League			Cup		Continental		Total	
Club	Season	Division	Apps	Goals	Apps	Goals	Apps	Goals	Apps	Goals
Sydney FC	2015–16	A-League	0	0	0	0	–	–	0	0
Wellington Phoenix	2016–17	A-League	20	1	0	0	–	–	20	1
Wellington Phoenix Reserves	2016–17	New Zealand Football Championship	1	0	0	0	0	0	1	0
Sydney FC	2018–19	A-League	9	2	0	0	2	0	11	2
Perth Glory	2019–20	A-League	15	0	1	0	0	0	16	0
Odisha	2020–21	Indian Super League	17	0	0	0	0	0	17	0
Adelaide United	2021–22	A-League	14	0	3	1	0	0	7	1
Western United	2022–23	A-League	1	0	0	0	0	0	1	0
Career total			77	3	4	1	2	0	83	4

== Honours ==
=== Club ===
Sydney FC

- A-League Champions: 2018–19
- National Youth League (Australia) Premiers: 2013–14

Sydney United

- National Premier Leagues NSW Premiers: 2016
