= Cole Alexander =

South African soccer player

Personal information
- Full name: Cole Alexander
- Date of birth: 9 July 1989 (age 37)
- Place of birth: Cape Town, South Africa
- Height: 1.77 m (5 ft 9 1/2 in)
- Position: Central midfielder

Team information
- Current team: Polokwane City
- Number: 12

Youth career
- Leeds Lentegeur
- Seven Stars
- Santos
- Hellenic
- –2008: Ajax Cape Town

Senior career*
Years	Team	Apps	(Gls)
2008–2014	Ajax Cape Town	43	(0)
2010–2011	→ Vasco da Gama (loan)	24	(0)
2012–2013	→ Chippa United (loan)	10	(0)
2014–2016	Polokwane City	52	(4)
2016–2018	SuperSport United	9	(2)
2018–2020	Bidvest Wits	57	(4)
2020–2021	Odisha	15	(3)
2021–2023	Kaizer Chiefs	26	(1)
2023	Helsingborg	7	(1)
2024–	Polokwane City	21	(0)

International career
2015–2017	South Africa	6	(1)
- * Club domestic league appearances and goals as of 10 February 2025

Cole Alexander (born 9 July 1989) is a South African professional soccer player who plays as a central midfielder for South African club Polokwane City.

== Early and personal life ==
Alexander was born in Cape Town, and grew up in the Lentegeur neighborhood of Mitchells Plain. He attended Lantana Primary School and later Golden Groove Primary School before attending Wittebome High School in Wynberg.

He is the son-in-law of Duncan Crowie, having married his daughter Jaime in March 2019.

== Club career ==
Cole started his junior career with local side Robert Bowman, and went on to play junior football with Seven Stars, Santos, Hellenic and Ajax Cape Town Juniors.

He started his senior career with Ajax Cape Town in 2008, and had loan spells with Vasco da Gama and Chippa United. He made 43 league appearances for Ajax without scoring.

On 23 June 2014, Cole joined Polokwane City on a two-year deal. He made 52 appearances across two seasons at the club, scoring two goals.

In February 2016, Cole signed for SuperSport United on a pre-contract agreement. He made 8 appearances for SuperSport United during the 2016–17 season, and 1 appearance during the 2017–18 season. Subsequently, Cole signed for Bidvest Wits in February 2018, where he made 57 league appearances across two-and-a-half seasons.

On 10 October 2020, he joined Indian Super League club Odisha FC on a two-year deal. Alexander scored his first goal for the club on 22 December in a 2–2 draw with NorthEast United FC. On 23 July 2021, Cole mutually terminated his contract with Odisha FC after reaching agreement over an undisclosed fee.

He returned to South Africa and Kaizer Chiefs in 2021. In the latter half of 2023 he played for Helsingborgs IF in the Swedish Superettan, but then left.
