= Saurabh Meher =

Indian footballer (born 2000)

Personal information
- Full name: Saurabh Meher
- Date of birth: 12 January 2000 (age 26)
- Place of birth: Mumbai, Maharashtra, India
- Height: 1.74 m (5 ft 8 1/2 in)
- Position: Right back

Youth career
- AIFF Elite Academy

Senior career*
Years	Team	Apps	(Gls)
2017–2019	Chennayin B	11	(0)
2019–2020	Indian Arrows	8	(0)
2020–2022	Odisha	3	(0)
2022–2024	Gokulam Kerala	0	(0)
2023	Gokulam Kerala B(loan)	0	(0)

International career
2015–2017	India U17	5	(3)
- * Club domestic league appearances and goals as of 04:52, 14 December 2020 (UTC)

Saurabh Meher (born 12 January 2000) is an Indian professional footballer who plays as a defender.

== Career ==
Saurabh was part of the India U-16 team which finished runners-up in the 2015 SAFF U-16 Championship, losing to Bangladesh U16 in the final on penalties. Saurabh was part of the AIFF Elite Academy batch that was preparing for the 2017 FIFA U-17 World Cup to be hosted in India. He made his professional debut for the side in the Arrow's first match of the 2019–20 season against Gokulam Kerala F.C. He started and played full match as Indian Arrows central defender and lost 0–1. Meher plays primarily in the heart of defence but can also slot in as a makeshift wing-back. Previously in the year 2018 he captained Chennayin FC B Team and Youth (U-18) team in I- League 2nd Division and Hero Elite League, where he led his team up to the semi-finals. He was also the part of India U-15 National team which played the SAFF U-16 Championship in 2015 Bangladesh. He was the Golden Boot Winner in SAFF U-16 Championship in 2015 edition. Saurabh Meher played as a central defender under Shanmugam Venkatesh in Hero I-League 2019–20 season and appeared eight times, spending a total of 649 minutes on the field.

=== Odisha FC ===
On 5 June 2020, Saurabh signed for Odisha FC on a long-term deal.

=== Gokulam Kerala ===
it was announced that saurabh will be a part of Gokulam kerala"s squad in the 2023 Durand cup

== Career statistics ==
As of 13 August 2023

Club	Season	League			League Cup		Domestic Cup		Continental		Total	
Club	Season	Division	Apps	Goals	Apps	Goals	Apps	Goals	Apps	Goals	Apps	Goals
Chennayin B	2017-18	I-League 2nd Division	10	0	0	0	0	0	—	—	10	0
Chennayin B	2018-19	I-League 2nd Division	1	0	0	0	0	0	—	—	1	0
Indian Arrows	2019–20	I-League	8	0	0	0	0	0	—	—	8	0
Odisha	2020–21	Indian Super League	3	0	0	0	0	0	—	—	3	0
Gokulam Kerala	2023–24	I-League	0	0	0	0	2 (Note: Appearance(s) in Durand Cup)	0	0	0	2	0
Career total			22	0	0	0	2	0	0	0	24	0
