= Odisha FC Reserves and Academy =

Reserves and youth system of Odisha FC

- Full name: Odisha Football Club Reserves and Academy
- Nicknames: The Kalinga Warriors; The Juggernauts
- Short name: OFC
- Founded: 31 August 2019; 6 years ago
- Ground: Kalinga Stadium; Bhubaneswar
- Capacity: 15,000
- Owner: GMS Inc.
- President: Raj Athwal
- Head coach: Amit Rana
- League: Elite League
- Website: http://www.odishafc.com
Home colours	Away colours

Odisha Football Club Reserves and Academy represent the youth system of the Indian Super League side Odisha, that competes in the Elite League, the main youth club competition of Indian football.

== History ==
On 20-February-2018, it was announced by the All India Football Federation, the organising body for Indian football, that Delhi Dynamos Football Club, along with six other Indian Super League sides, would field a reserve team in the I-League 2nd Division, India's second division football league. The reserve side squad and coaches were then unveiled a few weeks later. On 06-March-2018, Francisco Perez Lazaro was confirmed as the reserve side's first head coach. The 2017–18 I-League 2nd Division was their first and last season in the league. Since then, the team has been participating in the Elite League, India's elite youth league. The team participated as Delhi Dynamos FC Reserves for the 2018–19 season.

=== Odisha ===
Ahead of the 2019–20 Indian football season, the club decided to relocated to its new base, i.e. the Kalinga Stadium in Bhubaneswar, Odisha and rechristen itself as Odisha FC. In the presence of the Naveen Patnaik, the Chief Minister of Odisha, and Tusharkanti Behera, the Minister for Department of Sports and Youth Services (DSYS), Government of Odisha, the Delhi Soccer Private Limited signed a Memorandum of Understanding (MoU) with the Government of Odisha, to facilitate the move, i.e. from the national capital New Delhi to Bhubaneswar. As per the MoU, it was mutually decided that the club's first team, youth teams, youth football development program and grassroots football development program will be based in Odisha.

== Squads ==
=== Reserves ===
As of 14-January-2025

Note: Flags indicate national team as defined under FIFA eligibility rules; some limited exceptions apply. Players may hold more than one non-FIFA nationality.

No.	Pos.	Nation	Player
1	GK	IND	Raj Boro
2	GK	IND	Jatin Chawla
3	DF	IND	Subham Bhattacharya
4	DF	IND	Tankadhar Bag
5	DF	IND	Dheeraj Datta
6	DF	IND	Sahil Tamang
7	FW	IND	Nelson Rymbai
8	FW	IND	Sunil Soren
9	FW	IND	Pungte Lapun
10	DF	IND	Dinesh Singh
11	DF	IND	Dwenjyoti Gogoi

No.	Pos.	Nation	Player
12	DF	IND	Jeremy Zohminglua (C)
15	FW	IND	Kartik Hantal
16	DF	IND	Ricky Meetei
17	MF	IND	Akshay
18	MF	IND	Yumkhaibam Indranath
19	FW	IND	Razibul Mistry
20	MF	IND	Kharon Subba
21	FW	IND	Mahesh Hansda
22	MF	IND	Satwik Sharma
23	MF	IND	Leivon Renglun Anand
25	FW	IND	Roshan Panna

=== U18 ===
As of 27-December-2022

Note: Flags indicate national team as defined under FIFA eligibility rules; some limited exceptions apply. Players may hold more than one non-FIFA nationality.

No.	Pos.	Nation	Player
1	GK	IND	Laxman Kisan
2	DF	IND	Nirmal Oram
3	DF	IND	Indra Oram
4	DF	IND	Prakash Mirdha
5	DF	IND	Mohan Guntha
6	MF	IND	Manjit Oram
7	FW	IND	Bhenketeswar Oram
8	MF	IND	Chintu Nag
9	FW	IND	Nilesh Tigga
10	MF	IND	Krishna Behera
11	FW	IND	Birsingh Naik

No.	Pos.	Nation	Player
12	DF	IND	Akash Khalko
13	DF	IND	Salhai Tudu
14	DF	IND	Mansingh Majhi
15	DF	IND	Jitmahal Tudu
16	MF	IND	Sumit Kumar
17	MF	IND	Gajen Murmu
18	MF	IND	Rohit Lakra
19	FW	IND	Prabin Lakra
20	FW	IND	Prasant Bari
21	MF	IND	Abhiman Kumar
22	GK	IND	Rahul Tirkey

=== Youth Player of the Season ===
==== U18 ====
Season	Player	Nationality	Position
2019–20	Akshunna Tyagi	India	Forward

==== U15 ====
Season	Player	Nationality	Position
2019–20	Nirmanyu Singh Atri	India	Forward

==== U13 ====
Season	Player	Nationality	Position
2019–20	Aditya Adhikari	India	Midfielder

== Records and statistics ==
=== Overview ===
==== Reserves ====
As of 18-February-2020

Season	I-League 2nd Division/Reliance Foundation Development League								Top Scorer	
Season	P	W	D	L	GF	GA	Pts	Position	Player	Goals
As Delhi Dynamos FC
2017–18	9	2	2	5	5	9	8	Group Stage – 5th Play-offs – DNQ	(India) Seiminmang Manchong	4
As Odisha FC
2022–23	TBD									

==== Youth ====
As of 18-February-2020

Season	Elite League								Top Scorer	
Season	P	W	D	L	GF	GA	Pts	Position	Player	Goals
As Delhi Dynamos FC
2018–19	13	8	2	3	40	13	26	Group Stage – 1st Play-offs – 4th	(India) Seiminmang Manchong	9
As Odisha FC
2019–20	14	9	4	1	45	12	31	Group Stage – 2nd Play-offs – Cancelled	(India) Akshunna Tyagi	20
2022-23	5	3	1	1	7	7	0	Group Stage – 2nd Knockouts – Round of 16	(India) Chintu Nag	3

=== Head coaches' record ===
==== Reserves ====
As of 30-June-2022

Name	Nationality	From	To	P	W	D	L	GF	GA	Win%
As Delhi Dynamos FC
Francisco Perez Lazaro	Spain	06-March-2018	31-January-2019	9	2	2	5	5	9	22.22
As Odisha FC
Amit Rana	India	TBD								

==== Youth ====
As of 18-February-2020

Name	Nationality	From	To	P	W	D	L	GF	GA	Win%
As Delhi Dynamos FC
Francisco Perez Lazaro	Spain	06-March-2018	31-January-2019	13	8	2	3	40	13	61.54
As Odisha FC
Sandeep Alhan	India	31-August-2019	18-February-2020	14	9	4	1	45	12	64.29
Ajaya Kumar Behera	India	29-December-2022	Present	5	3	1	1	7	7	60.00

== Personnel ==
Position	Name
Reserves head coach	(India) Amit Rana
U18, U15 head coach	(India) Sandeep Alhan
U13 head coach	(India) Kirti Kashyap
Head of football operations	(India) Abhik Chatterjee
Head of women's football	(India) Randeep Baruah
Youth teams manager	(India) Sayantan Ganguly
Grassroots manager	(India) Suvam Das

== See also ==
- Odisha FC
- Odisha FC Women
