= 2017–18 Delhi Dynamos FC season =

2017–18 season of Delhi Dynamos FC

Delhi Dynamos
2017–18 season
- Owner: (United States) GMS Inc.
- Head Coach: (Spain) Miguel Ángel Portugal
- Stadium: Jawaharlal Nehru Stadium
- ISL: 8th
- Super Cup: Qualifying round
- Top goalscorer: Kalu Uche (11 goals)
Home colours

The 2017–18 Delhi Dynamos FC season was the club's fourth season since its establishment in 2014 and their fourth season in the Indian Super League.

== Pre Season Friendlies ==
The club headed to Spain and Qatar on a 41 days pre-season tour, starting from 10 September.

20 September 2017 Friendly	Atlético Astorga FC (Spain)	5–2	(India) Delhi Dynamos FC	Astorga, Spain
20:00 CET	Emilio 29'; Samuel Villa 40'; Gonzalo González 55'; Roberto Puente 75'; Javi Amor 79'	Report	G. Fernandez 30'; Seityasen 87'	Stadium: Estadio La Eragudina

27 September 2017 Friendly	Real Oviedo (Spain)	1–0	(India) Delhi Dynamos FC	Oviedo, Spain
18:00 CET	David González 21'	Report		Stadium: El Requexón

5 October 2017 Friendly	Muaither SC (Qatar)	0–1	(India) Delhi Dynamos FC	Doha, Qatar
18:00 AST		Report	Chhangte 15'	Stadium: Aspire Academy

12 October 2017 Friendly	Al-Wakrah SC (Qatar)	3–1	(India) Delhi Dynamos FC	Al Wakrah, Qatar
18:00 AST	Goal	Report	Ngaihte 65'	Stadium: Saoud bin Abdulrahman Stadium

19 October 2017 Friendly	Army Team (Qatar)	1–2	(India) Delhi Dynamos FC	Doha, Qatar
19:30 AST	Mogo 1'	Report	Uche 33'; Chichero 45'

== Transfers ==
Unlike other Indian Super League franchises Delhi Dynamos decided not retain any players from their previous season squad before 2017–18 players draft which enabled them to enter in the round one of players draft along with new entrant Jamshedpur FC.

In ISL draft held on 23 July 2017, Delhi Dynamos added fifteen new players to their squad. Goalkeeper Albino Gomes, Sukhdev Patil and Arnab Das Sharma, defender Pritam Kotal, Sena Ralte, Pratik Chowdhary, Mohammad Sajid Dhot, Rowilson Rodrigues and Munmun Lugun, midfielder Seityasen Singh, Vinit Rai, Romeo Fernandes, David Ngaihte and Simranjit Singh and Lallianzuala Chhangte.

Delhi Dynamos announced signing of Brazilian midfielder Paulinho Dias on 28 July 2017. On 1 August, Delhi Dynamos announced signing of Uruguayan midfielder Matías Mirabaje. Signing of Argentinian forward Juan Vogliotti was announced on 4 August. Franchise announced on 10 August, they signed Venezuelan defender Gabriel Cichero. On 29 August, Delhi Dynamos published a statement on their website that signing of Argentinian forward Juan Vogliotti could not be completed due to unavoidable circumstances. Juan Vogliotti said:

I want to let you all know that I never had any bad intentions. Things were badly planned from my end and I should have completed all formalities before agreeing with Delhi Dynamos. Please accept my sincere apologies as I will not be able to leave this club and play in front of the amazing crowd in Delhi. Maybe, sometimes things do not go the way you want them too.

Delhi Dynamos announced on 7 September, they signed Nigerian forward Kalu Uche. On 12 September, Delhi Dynamos announced signing of Curaçaoan forward Guyon Fernandez and Spanish defender Edu Moya. On 14 September, Delhi Dynamos announced signing of their seventh foreign player, Dutch forward Jeroen Lumu.

On 19 September, Delhi Dynamos announced they signed Indian U19 international players Kishan Singh Thongam and Jayananda Singh Moirangthem. On the matter managing director Rohan Sharma said:

I’d like to extend my warmest greetings to Jayananda and Kishan, these two players have a lot of potential and I’m happy they have chosen Delhi Dynamos to be their new club. We hope we can help Jayananda and Kishan grow and develop into the next Indian superstars.

On 21 September, Delhi Dynamos announced signing of Nanda Kumar on a loan deal from I-League side Chennai City.

=== In ===
Pos.	Player	Previous club	Date	Ref
GK	(India) Albino Gomes	Mumbai City	23 July 2017	
DF	(India) Pritam Kotal	Mohun Bagan	23 July 2017	
FW	(India) Lallianzuala Chhangte	DSK Shivajians	23 July 2017	
DF	(India) Sena Ralte	Mumbai City	23 July 2017	
MF	(India) Seityasen Singh	NorthEast United	23 July 2017	
DF	(India) Pratik Chowdhary	Mumbai	23 July 2017	
MF	(India) Vinit Rai	Kerala Blasters	23 July 2017	
MF	(India) Romeo Fernandes	Goa	23 July 2017	
MF	(India) David Ngaihte	Minerva Punjab	23 July 2017	
GK	(India) Sukhadev Patil	Mumbai	23 July 2017	
DF	(India) Mohammad Sajid Dhot	DSK Shivajians	23 July 2017	
DF	(India) Rowilson Rodrigues	Churchill Brothers	23 July 2017	
DF	(India) Munmun Lugun	Mumbai	23 July 2017	
GK	(India) Arnab Das Sharma	Minerva Punjab	23 July 2017	
MF	(India) Simranjit Singh	Minerva Punjab	23 July 2017	
MF	(Brazil) Paulinho Dias	(Brazil) Atlético Paranaense	28 July 2017	
MF	(Uruguay) Matías Mirabaje	(Peru) Unión Comercio	31 July 2017	
FW	(Argentina) Juan Vogliotti	(Bolivia) Sport Boys	3 August 2017	
DF	(Venezuela) Gabriel Cichero	(Venezuela) Deportivo Lara	10 August 2017	
FW	(Nigeria) Kalu Uche	(Spain) Almería	7 September 2017	
DF	(Spain) Edu Moya	(Spain) Cacereño	12 September 2017	
FW	(Curaçao) Guyon Fernandez	(Netherlands) ADO Den Haag	12 September 2017	
FW	(Netherlands) Jeroen Lumu	(Turkey) Samsunspor	13 September 2017	

=== Out ===
Pos.	Player	New Club	Date	Ref
DF	(India) Lalchhawnkima	Mumbai	1 January 2017	
MF	(Brazil) Bruno Pelissari	Released	1 January 2017	
MF	(India) Denson Devadas	Chennai City	1 January 2017	
FW	(India) Arjun Tudu	Released	1 January 2017	
FW	(Senegal) Badara Badji	Released	1 January 2017	
FW	(Brazil) Marcelinho	(Brazil) Avaí	18 January 2017	
DF	(Spain) Rubén González	(Spain) Coruxo	25 January 2017	
MF	(Senegal) Ibrahima Niasse	(Greece) Levadiakos	26 January 2017	
MF	(Spain) Marcos Tébar	(Spain) Reus	31 January 2017	
DF	(Ghana) David Addy	(Finland) RoPS	30 March 2017	
MF	(France) Florent Malouda	Released	1 July 2017	
FW	(Ghana) Richard Gadze	(Azerbaijan) Zira	1 July 2017	
GK	(India) Soram Anganba	Mohun Bagan	1 July 2017	
DF	(India) Anas Edathodika	Jamshedpur	23 July 2017	
MF	(India) Amoes Do	Released	23 July 2017	
MF	(India) Sahil Tavora	Mumbai City	23 July 2017	
MF	(India) Romeo Fernandes	Delhi Dynamos	23 July 2017	

=== Loan in ===
Pos.	Name	From	Date from	Date to	Ref
MF	(India) Nanda Kumar	Chennai City	17 September 2017	30 July 2017	

== Squad ==
As of 27 October 2017

Note: Flags indicate national team as defined under FIFA eligibility rules; some limited exceptions apply. Players may hold more than one non-FIFA nationality.

No.	Pos.	Nation	Player
32	GK	IND	Albino Gomes
41	GK	ESP	Xabi Irureta
29	GK	IND	Arnab Das Sharma
20	DF	IND	Pritam Kotal
—	DF	IND	Sena Ralte
—	DF	VEN	Gabriel Cichero
—	DF	ESP	Edu Moya
—	DF	IND	Pratik Chowdhary
—	DF	IND	Mohammad Sajid Dhot
—	DF	IND	Rowilson Rodrigues
—	DF	IND	Simranjit Singh
—	DF	IND	Jayananda Singh
—	DF	IND	Munmun Lugun

No.	Pos.	Nation	Player
—	DF	IND	Kishan Singh
—	MF	BRA	Paulinho Dias
—	MF	URU	Matías Mirabaje
—	MF	IND	David Ngaihte
—	MF	IND	Romeo Fernandes
—	MF	IND	Vinit Rai
—	MF	IND	Seityasen Singh
—	MF	IND	Nanda Kumar (on loan from Chennai City F.C.)
—	FW	IND	Lallianzuala Chhangte
—	FW	NGR	Kalu Uche
—	FW	CUW	Guyon Fernandez
—	FW	NED	Jeroen Lumu

=== Current Technical Staff ===
Position	Name		
Head coach	(Spain) Miguel Ángel Portugal		
Assistant coach	(India) Shakti Chauhan		
Assistant coach	(Spain) Gonzalo Yarza		
Head of Performance Analysis	(India) Joy Gabriel	Goalkeeping coach	(Spain) Martín Ruiz

== Indian Super League ==
Pos	Team	Pld	W	D	L	GF	GA	GD	Pts
6	Kerala Blasters	18	6	7	5	20	22	−2	25
7	Mumbai City	18	7	2	9	25	29	−4	23
8	Delhi Dynamos	18	5	4	9	27	37	−10	19
9	ATK	18	4	4	10	16	30	−14	16
10	NorthEast United	18	3	2	13	12	27	−15	11

Source: Indian Super League
Rules for classification: 1) points; 2) head-to-head points; 3) head-to-head goal difference; 4) head-to-head goals scored; 5) goal difference; 5) number of goals scored; 6) fair play ranking; 6) drawing of lots

=== Matches ===
22 November 2017 1	Pune City	2–3	Delhi Dynamos	Pune, India
20:00 IST (UTC+5:30)	Emiliano Alfaro 67'; Marcelo Leite Pereira (yellow card) 87'; Marcos Tébar 90'		Paulinho Dias 46'; Lallianzuala Chhangte 54'; Matías Mirabaje 65' (yellow card) 79'; Gabriel Cichero (yellow card) 88'	Stadium: Balewadi Stadium; Attendance: 7,912; Man of the Match: Lallianzuala Chhangte (Delhi Dynamos)

26 November 2017 2	Bengaluru	4–1	Delhi Dynamos	Bengaluru, India
20:00 IST (UTC+5:30)	Erik Paartalu 23', 45'; Lenny Rodrigues 57'; Miku 87'		Gabriel Cichero (yellow card) 27'; Guyon Fernandez (yellow card) 67'; Kalu Uche 86' (pen.)	Stadium: Sree Kanteerava Stadium; Attendance: 18,249; Man of the Match: Erik Paartalu (Bengaluru FC)

2 December 2017 3	Delhi Dynamos	0–2	NorthEast United	Delhi, India
20:00 IST (UTC+5:30)	Guyon Fernandez (yellow card) 55'; Ngaihte (yellow card) 82'		Marcinho 17'; Danilo 22' (yellow card) 90'; Rehenesh (yellow card) 89'	Stadium: Jawaharlal Nehru Stadium; Attendance: 11,453; Referee: O Thakur; Man of the Match: Halicharan Narzary (NEUFC)

6 December 2017 4	Delhi dynamos	0–1	Jamshedpur	Delhi, India
20:00 IST (UTC+5:30)			Izu Azuka (yellow card) 55' (goal) 61'	Stadium: Jawaharlal Nehru Stadium (Delhi); Attendance: 7,953; Man of the Match: André Bikey (Jamshedpur)

16 December 2017 5	Delhi dynamos	1–5	Goa	Delhi, India
20:00 IST (UTC+5:30)				Stadium: Jawaharlal Nehru Stadium (Delhi); Attendance: 6,345

23 December 2017 6	ATK	1–0	Delhi Dynamos	Kolkata, India
20:00 IST (UTC+5:30)				Stadium: Salt Lake Stadium; Attendance: 22,478

29 December 2017 7	Mumbai City	4–0	Delhi Dynamos	Mumbai, India
20:00 IST (UTC+5:30)				Stadium: Mumbai Football Arena; Attendance: 5,672

7 January 2017 8	Chennaiyin	2–2	Delhi Dynamos	Chennai, India
20:00 IST (UTC+5:30)				Stadium: Jawaharlal Nehru Stadium; Attendance: 13,889

10 January 2017 9	Delhi Dynamos	1–3	Kerala Blasters	Delhi, India
20:00 IST (UTC+5:30)				Stadium: Jawaharlal Nehru Stadium (Delhi); Attendance: 10,132

14 January 2017 10	Delhi Dynamos	2–0	Bengaluru	Delhi, India
20:00 IST (UTC+5:30)				Stadium: Jawaharlal Nehru Stadium (Delhi); Attendance: 5,124

== Player statistics ==
As of 28 October 2017

List of squad players, including number of appearances by competition

No.	Pos	Nat	Player	Total		Indian Super League	
No.	Pos	Nat	Player	Apps	Goals	Apps	Goals
	GK	(India) IND	Albino Gomes	0	0	0	0
	GK	(India) IND	Sukhadev Patil	0	0	0	0
	GK	(India) IND	Arnab Das Sharma	0	0	0	0
	DF	(India) IND	Pritam Kotal	0	0	0	0
	DF	(India) IND	Sena Ralte	0	0	0	0
	DF	(Venezuela) VEN	Gabriel Cichero	0	0	0	0
	DF	(Spain) ESP	Edu Moya	0	0	0	0
	DF	(India) IND	Pratik Chowdhary	0	0	0	0
	DF	(India) IND	Mohammad Sajid Dhot	0	0	0	0
	DF	(India) IND	Rowilson Rodrigues	0	0	0	0
	DF	(India) IND	Simranjit Singh	0	0	0	0
	DF	(India) IND	Jayananda Singh	0	0	0	0
	DF	(India) IND	Munmun Lugun	0	0	0	0
	DF	(India) IND	Kishan Singh	0	0	0	0
	MF	(Brazil) BRA	Paulinho Dias	0	0	0	0
	MF	(Uruguay) URU	Matías Mirabaje	0	0	0	0
	MF	(India) IND	David Ngaihte	0	0	0	0
	MF	(India) IND	Romeo Fernandes	0	0	0	0
	MF	(India) IND	Pratesh Shirodkar	0	0	0	0
	MF	(India) IND	Vinit Rai	0	0	0	0
	MF	(India) IND	Seityasen Singh	0	0	0	0
	MF	(India) IND	Nanda Kumar	0	0	0	0
	FW	(India) IND	Lallianzuala Chhangte	0	0	0	0
	FW	(Nigeria) NGR	Kalu Uche	0	0	0	0
	FW	(Curaçao) CUW	Guyon Fernandez	0	0	0	0
	FW	(Netherlands) NED	Jeroen Lumu	0	0	0	0
