= Guyon Fernandez =

Curaçao footballer (born 1986)

Personal information
- Date of birth: 18 April 1986 (age 40)
- Place of birth: The Hague, Netherlands
- Height: 1.84 m (6 ft 0 in)
- Position: Forward

Youth career
- Graaf Willem II VAC
- Quick (H)
- ADO Den Haag

Senior career*
Years	Team	Apps	(Gls)
2007–2008	ADO Den Haag	11	(1)
2008–2011	Excelsior	67	(28)
2011–2014	Feyenoord	28	(7)
2013–2014	→ PEC Zwolle (loan)	24	(10)
2015	NAC	15	(2)
2015–2016	Perth Glory	5	(1)
2016	Stal Dniprodzerzhynsk	2	(0)
2017	ADO Den Haag	13	(1)
2017–2018	Delhi Dynamos	10	(2)
2019–2020	Lienden	16	(2)
2020–2022	Smitshoek		
Total		191	(54)

International career
2018	Curaçao	2	(0)
- * Club domestic league appearances and goals

Guyon Fernandez (born 18 April 1986) is a retired footballer who played as a forward. Born in the Netherlands, he played for the Curaçao national team.

He formerly played for ADO Den Haag, Excelsior, Feyenoord, PEC Zwolle, NAC Breda, Perth Glory, Stal Dniprodzerzhynsk, Delhi Dynamos and FC Lienden.

== Club career ==
=== ADO Den Haag ===
Fernandez started his professional career with ADO Den Haag in the Dutch Eerste Divisie. He played 11 matches in his first season in which he scored once.

=== Excelsior ===
On 16 May 2010, Fernandez missed a penalty, but then scored an injury-time equaliser against city rivals Sparta to win Excelsior promotion to the Eredivisie and sending Sparta down at the same time. In his first season in the Eredivisie, while playing for Excelsior, Fernandez was praised for performance in a victory against local rivals Feyenoord, in which he scored two goals. In March 2011 Fernandez was the subject of interest from Romanian side Steaua Bucharest.

=== Feyenoord ===
In May 2011, it was announced that Fernandez had signed for Feyenoord at the start of the 2011–12 season. He was supposed to succeed Luc Castaignos who had left to Internazionale. In his first season Fernandez stood in a negative way. In November 2011, he received a six-game ban for hitting opposition player Rens van Eijden. Fernandez claimed he was reacting to racist abuse from van Eijden.

Fernandez was sent on loan to PEC Zwolle for the 2013–14 season. On 20 April 2014, Fernandez scored twice in the first half as PEC Zwolle beat Ajax 5–1 in the KNVB Cup final.

=== NAC Breda ===
In October 2014 Fernandez was linked with a transfer to Bulgarian club Levski Sofia, following trials in Saudi Arabia and with Spanish club Real Valladolid. In November 2014, he began training with former club Excelsior. In January 2015 he went on trial with English club Sheffield Wednesday. On 12 January 2015, it was announced that Fernandez had signed a deal with NAC Breda until the end of the season.

=== Perth Glory ===
On 11 August 2015, it was announced that Fernandez signed with Australian A-League side Perth Glory. On 25 October 2015 Guyon Fernandez scored his first goal for Perth Glory against Adelaide United. Fernandez was released by Perth Glory in January 2016.

=== ADO Den Haag ===
He then returned to ADO Den Haag.

=== Delhi Dynamos ===
He signed for Delhi Dynamos on 12 September 2017, alongside Edu Moya. Fernandez was released by the Delhi Dynamos on 10 February 2018.

=== Return to the Netherlands ===
On 12 June 2019, Fernandez signed with Derde Divisie club FC Lienden. After a year, he moved to VV Smitshoek in the fifth tier.

== International career ==
Fernandez was part of the squad for the Curaçao national team in the 2014 Caribbean Cup. In August 2015, he was called up by the then Curaçao manager Patrick Kluivert for the second time, for the Curaçao squad for the two World Cup qualification matches against El Salvador. Fernandez made his international debut for the Curaçao national team in a 1–1 friendly tie with Bolivia on 23 March 2018.
