= Paulinho Dias =

Brazilian footballer (born 1988)

Personal information
- Full name: Paulo Henrique Dias da Cruz
- Date of birth: 13 May 1988 (age 38)
- Place of birth: Belo Horizonte, Brazil
- Height: 1.75 m (5 ft 9 in)
- Position: Defensive midfielder

Team information
- Current team: Aimoré

Youth career
- 1999–2007: Cruzeiro

Senior career*
Years	Team	Apps	(Gls)
2007–2008	Cruzeiro	8	(0)
2008	→ Ipatinga (loan)	16	(0)
2009	Marília	10	(0)
2009–2010	Joinville	11	(2)
2011	Guaratinguetá	15	(0)
2012	Veranópolis	13	(0)
2012	→ Chapecoense (loan)	17	(1)
2013	Chapecoense	50	(6)
2014–2017	Atlético Paranaense	45	(2)
2015	→ Bahia (loan)	10	(0)
2016	→ Joinville (loan)	20	(0)
2017–2018	Delhi Dynamos	15	(1)
2018–2020	Ituano	50	(4)
2021	Tombense	14	(0)
2021–	Aimoré	12	(0)
- * Club domestic league appearances and goals as of 16:02, 22 November 2017 (UTC)

Paulo Henrique Dias da Cruz, or simply Paulinho Dias, (born 13 May 1988) is a Brazilian professional footballer who plays as a defensive midfielder for Aimoré.

== Career ==
A Cruzeiro youth graduate, Dias made his first-team – and Série A – debut on 12 May 2007, in a 2–2 away draw against Fluminense. He was subsequently loaned to Ipatinga, and joined Marília in 2009, after his link with Cruzeiro expired. After stints at Joinville, Guaratinguetá and Veranópolis, Dias moved to Chapecoense in the 2012 summer. He enjoyed two subsequent promotions with the club, being a starter in the vast majority of his spell. On 3 January 2014, Dias signed for Atlético Paranaense.

On 28 July 2017, Paulinho Dias joined Indian Super League side Delhi Dynamos.

== Honours ==
Cruzeiro

- Copa São Paulo de Juniores: 2007

Veranópolis

- Campeonato Gaúcho do Interior: 2012
