= 2016 Delhi Dynamos FC season =

2016 season of Delhi Dynamos FC

Delhi Dynamos
2016 season
- Owner: (United States) GMS Inc.
- Head Coach: (Italy) Gianluca Zambrotta
- Stadium: Jawaharlal Nehru Stadium
- ISL: 3rd
- ISL Playoffs: Semi-final

The 2016 Delhi Dynamos FC season was club's third season since its establishment in 2014 and also their third season in the Indian Super League.

== Background ==
After the end of the 2014 ISL season, Delhi Dynamos parted ways with their inaugural season head coach, Harm van Veldhoven. Soon after, Roberto Carlos, was named as the new head coach for the 2015 season. The season began for Delhi Dynamos with a 2–0 loss to the Goa on 4 October. The team ended the season with six wins through fourteen matches and qualified for the finals. In the finals, the Delhi Dynamos took on Goa. In the home-leg, the Dynamos won 1–0 with Robin Singh scoring the winner. However, in the away second-leg, the Dynamos lost 3–0 and were thus knocked-out of the ISL finals 3–1 aggregate.

== Player movement ==
=== Retained players ===
Foreign players

| Position | Player |
|---|---|
| GK | (Spain) Toni Doblas |

==== Domestic ====
| Position | Player |
|---|---|
| GK | (India) Sanjiban Ghosh |
| DF | (India) Anas Edathodika |
| MF | (India) Souvik Chakraborty |

=== Signings ===
| Position | Player | Old club | Date | Ref |
|---|---|---|---|---|
| MF | (India) Kean Lewis | (India) Mohun Bagan | 21 June 2016 | |

== Indian Super League ==
| Pos | Team | Pld | W | D | L | GF | GA | GD | Pts | Qualification |
|---|---|---|---|---|---|---|---|---|---|---|
| 1 | Mumbai City | 14 | 6 | 5 | 3 | 16 | 8 | +8 | 23 | Advance to ISL Play-offs |
| 2 | Kerala Blasters | 14 | 6 | 4 | 4 | 12 | 14 | −2 | 22 | Advance to ISL Play-offs |
| 3 | Delhi Dynamos | 14 | 5 | 6 | 3 | 27 | 17 | +10 | 21 | Advance to ISL Play-offs |
| 4 | Atlético de Kolkata (C) | 14 | 4 | 8 | 2 | 16 | 14 | +2 | 20 | Advance to ISL Play-offs |
| 5 | NorthEast United | 14 | 5 | 3 | 6 | 14 | 14 | 0 | 18 | |

Source: Indian Super League
Rules for classification: 1) points; 2) head-to-head points; 3) head-to-head goal difference; 4) goal difference; 5) number of goals scored; 6) play-off match
(C) Champions

== Player statistics ==
Season stats
| # | Position | Player | GP | G |
|---|---|---|---|---|
| | GK | (India) Sanjiban Ghosh | 0 | 0 |
| | GK | (Spain) Toni Doblas | 0 | 0 |
| | DF | (India) Anas Edathodika | 0 | 0 |
| | MF | (India) Kean Lewis | 0 | 0 |
| | MF | (India) Souvik Chakraborty | 0 | 0 |

== See also ==
- 2016–17 in Indian football
