= 2024–25 Odisha FC season =

Odisha
2024–25 season
- Owner: GMS Inc.
- President: Raj Athwal
- Head coach: Sergio Lobera
- Stadium: Kalinga Stadium
- Indian Super League: 7th
- Kalinga Super Cup: Round of 16
- Top goalscorer: League: Diego Maurício (9); All: Diego Maurício (9)
- Highest home attendance: 10,814 (vs Kerala Blasters, 3 October 2024)
- Lowest home attendance: 5,461 (vs Mohammedan, 1 March 2025)
- Average home league attendance: 7,651
Home colours

The 2024–25 season was Odisha Football Club's sixth professional season in the Indian Super League since their establishment in 2019. Odisha entered the season under head coach Sergio Lobera, who had extended his contract with the club until 2026 following the previous season.

Odisha began their competitive campaign by finishing as runners-up in the 2024 Bandodkar Trophy, before beginning their Indian Super League campaign in September 2024. The club endured an inconsistent league campaign but remained in contention for a play-off place until the final weeks of the season. Odisha finished seventh in the league with 33 points from 24 matches, recording eight wins, nine draws and seven defeats, with 44 goals scored and 37 conceded. They narrowly missed the play-offs, with sixth-placed Mumbai City FC finishing on 36 points.

Diego Maurício was Odisha's leading scorer in the league, scoring nine goals, while also providing six assists. His performances made him the club's most productive attacking player during the campaign. Hugo Boumous, Jerry Mawihmingthanga and Mourtada Fall also scored five goals each in the league.

Following the conclusion of the league season, Odisha participated in the 2025 Kalinga Super Cup. They were eliminated in the round of 16 after a 3–0 defeat to Punjab FC at the Kalinga Stadium on 21 April 2025, bringing their 2024–25 campaign to an end.
