= Kartik Hantal =

Indian footballer

- Kartik Hantal with Odisha FC during the 2025–26 Indian Super League season.

Personal information
- Full name: Kartik Hantal
- Date of birth: 17 March 2002 (age 24)
- Place of birth: Odisha, India
- Position: Forward

Team information
- Current team: Odisha FC
- Number: 9

Senior career*
Years	Team	Apps	(Gls)
2025–	Odisha FC	9	(1)
- * Club domestic league appearances and goals as of 11 October 2026

Kartik Hantal, nicknamed Rancho, is an Indian professional footballer who plays as a forward for Indian Super League club Odisha FC. He has represented Odisha in the Santosh Trophy, India's national football championship for state teams.

== Career ==
=== Odisha ===
Hantal represented Odisha in the 2021–22 Santosh Trophy. On 19 April 2022, he scored the only goal in a 1–0 group-stage victory against Manipur in the 75th National Football Championship for the Santosh Trophy.

He was part of the Odisha team that competed in the 2022–23 Santosh Trophy. Odisha finished second in its qualifying group and subsequently placed fifth in Group A of the final round, held in Bhubaneswar in February 2023.

In the qualifying round of the 2024–25 Santosh Trophy, Hantal scored twice in Odisha's 4–1 victory against Chhattisgarh on 23 November 2024. Odisha won both of its matches in the three-team qualifying group to advance to the final round.

In the final round, Hantal scored in Odisha's 2–0 victory against Goa on 17 December 2024. He converted a close-range free kick in the 64th minute, four minutes after Rahul Mukhi had opened the scoring. He scored five goals during the tournament's final-round matches, according to the All India Football Federation's preview of the quarter-finals.

Hantal continued to represent Odisha in the 2025–26 Santosh Trophy. Odisha won all three of its qualifying matches in December 2025 to finish top of Group F and advance to the final round. Hantal, listed as the team's captain, scored in the 3–1 victory against Chhattisgarh on 26 December.

In the final round, Hantal scored Odisha's opening goal in a 5–2 defeat against Punjab on 31 January 2026. He headed home a rebound in the 37th minute after a shot by Srikant Gadaba struck the woodwork.

=== Odisha FC ===
Hantal plays for Odisha FC in the Indian Super League. The league's official player profile records nine appearances and one goal for him in the 2025–26 season. It also lists one chance created and one key pass during that season.

== Career statistics ==
=== Club ===
Club appearances and goals
Club	Season	League	Apps	Goals
Odisha FC	2025–26	Indian Super League	9	1
Total			9	1

Statistics are limited to league appearances and goals recorded in the official Indian Super League profile for the 2025–26 season.
