= 2023–24 Odisha FC season =

Odisha
2023–24 season
- Owner: GMS Inc.
- President: Raj Athwal
- Head coach: Clifford Miranda (interim, until 25 April); Sergio Lobera (from 17 May)
- Stadium: Kalinga Stadium
- Indian Super League: 4th
- AFC Cup: Inter-zone Semi-finalists
- ISL Play-offs: Semi-finalists
- Kalinga Super Cup: Runners-Up
- Top goalscorer: League: Roy Krishna (13); All: Diego Maurício (17)
- Highest home attendance: 7,624 (vs Bengaluru, 31 October 2023)
- Lowest home attendance: 4,102 (vs Chennaiyin, 23 September 2023)
- Average home league attendance: 5,907
Home colours	Away colours

The 2023–24 season was Odisha Football Club's fifth professional season in the Indian Super League since their establishment in 2019. Odisha finished fourth in the Indian Super League league stage with 39 points from 22 matches, recording 11 wins, six draws and five defeats. The club subsequently reached the semi-finals of the play-offs for the first time in its history, defeating Kerala Blasters FC 2–1 in the knockout round before losing 3–2 on aggregate to Mohun Bagan Super Giant in the semi-finals.

Odisha entered the 2023–24 AFC Cup after winning the 2023 Super Cup and subsequently defeating Gokulam Kerala FC in the Indian club play-off to qualify for the AFC Cup group stage. Under head coach Sergio Lobera, Odisha were drawn in Group D alongside Mohun Bagan Super Giant, Bashundhara Kings and Maziya S&RC. They finished top of the group with 12 points from six matches, becoming the 2023–24 AFC Cup South Zone champions and advancing to the Inter-Zone semi-finals.

In the Inter-Zone semi-finals, Odisha faced Australian side Central Coast Mariners. They lost the first leg 4–0 in Gosford before drawing the second leg 0–0 at the Kalinga Stadium, losing the tie 4–0 on aggregate and exiting the competition.

Odisha also reached the final of the 2024 Kalinga Super Cup. They won their group to qualify for the semi-finals and defeated Mumbai City FC to reach the final, where they faced East Bengal FC. Odisha took the lead through Diego Maurício and later equalised through Ahmed Jahouh, but East Bengal won 3–2 after extra time to claim the trophy.

Diego Maurício was Odisha's leading scorer across all competitions with 17 goals, including 11 in the ISL, three in the AFC Cup and three in the Super Cup. Roy Krishna was the club's leading scorer in the ISL with 13 goals and finished the season with 15 goals across all competitions.

The season was also notable for Odisha's 13-match unbeaten run in the ISL, which included eight wins and five draws. The club remained unbeaten at the Kalinga Stadium throughout the ISL league stage, collecting 27 points from 11 home matches, before extending the unbeaten home run with a 2–1 victory over Kerala Blasters in the play-off knockout round and a 2–1 victory over Mohun Bagan Super Giant in the first leg of the semi-final.
