= DEN Networks =

Television distribution company in India

DEN Networks Limited
- Type: Public
- Traded as: BSE: 533137; NSE: DEN
- Industry: Telecommunications
- Founded: 2007; 19 years ago
- Headquarters: New Delhi, India
- Key people: S.N.Sharma, CEO
- Products: FTTH; Cable television; Broadband; Internet service
- Owner: Reliance Industries (78.62%)
- Website: dennetworks.com

DEN Networks Limited is an Indian cable television and broadband service provider company in India. It is owned by Sameer Manchanda and was acquired by Reliance Industries in 2018 along with Hathway. In 2003, it stood as one of the three major cable distributors in India alongside Hathway and InCablenet.

On 17 October 2018, Reliance Industries announced that it had acquired a 66% stake in DEN for ₹2,290 crore (US$240 million). At the time of the acquisition, DEN had 106,000 broadband subscribers. The acquisition received approval from the Competition Commission of India in January 2019. Reliance acquired an additional 12.05% stake in DEN in March 2019 taking its total stake in the company to 78.62%.
