= Juan Vogliotti =

Argentine footballer

Personal information
- Full name: Juan Leandro Vogliotti
- Date of birth: 11 April 1985 (age 41)
- Place of birth: Río Cuarto, Córdoba, Argentina
- Height: 1.80 m (5 ft 11 in)
- Position: Forward

Team information
- Current team: Guabirá
- Number: 33

Senior career*
Years	Team	Apps	(Gls)
2004	Sportivo Belgrano	0	(0)
2006–2007	Independiente	28	(6)
2007–2008	Cipolletti	15	(3)
2009	Victory	0	(0)
2010	Sportivo Atenas	18	(13)
2010–2011	Gimnasia Tiro	37	(9)
2012	Villa Cubas	10	(0)
2012–2013	Estudiantes Río Cuarto	20	(8)
2013	Athletico Trinidad	7	(0)
2014	Patriotas Boyacá	1	(0)
2015–2016	Ciclón	37	(17)
2016–2017	Sport Boys Warnes	38	(22)
2018	Monagas	14	(3)
2018	Jaguares de Córdoba	10	(0)
2019	Real Potosí	15	(9)
2020–2022	Guabirá	45	(10)
2022	Destroyers	13	(6)
2023	C.D. Vaca Díez	12	(5)
2023–	Guabirá	13	(0)

Managerial career
- 2019: Real Potosí (caretaker)
- * Club domestic league appearances and goals as of 3 August 2017

Juan Leandro Vogliotti (born April 11, 1985) is an Argentine footballer who plays as a striker for Guabirá in Bolivian Primera División.
