= Edu Moya =

Spanish footballer

Personal information
- Full name: Eduardo Moya Cantillo
- Date of birth: 3 January 1981 (age 45)
- Place of birth: Monesterio, Spain
- Height: 1.75 m (5 ft 9 in)
- Position: Right-back

Youth career
- 1995–1997: EMF Monesterio
- 1997–1999: Extremadura

Senior career*
Years	Team	Apps	(Gls)
1999–2000	Extremadura B	38	(4)
2000–2002	Extremadura	26	(1)
2002–2006	Tenerife	100	(1)
2004	→ Mallorca (loan)	9	(0)
2006–2008	Recreativo	31	(0)
2008–2010	Celta	31	(1)
2010	Hércules	1	(0)
2010–2011	Xerez	8	(0)
2012–2013	Fyllingsdalen	22	(2)
2013–2014	Club Bolívar	11	(1)
2014–2015	Lusitanos		
2015–2016	Recreativo	21	(0)
2016–2017	Cacereño	14	(0)
2017–2018	Delhi Dynamos	10	(0)
2019–2020	Llerenense	27	(0)
Total		349	(10)
- * Club domestic league appearances and goals

Eduardo 'Edu' Moya Cantillo (born 3 January 1981 in Monesterio, Extremadura) is a Spanish former professional footballer who played as a right-back.
