= Odisha FC =

Association football club in India

Odisha
- Full name: Odisha Football Club
- Nicknames: The Juggernauts; The Kalinga Warriors
- Short name: OFC
- Founded: 14 October 2014; 12 years ago (as Delhi Dynamos FC); 31 August 2019; 7 years ago (rebranded as Odisha FC)
- Ground: Kalinga Stadium
- Capacity: 15,000
- Owner: GMS Leadership
- CEO: Ashish Shah
- Head coach: T. G. Purushothaman
- League: Indian Super League
- 2025–26: Indian Super League, 11th of 14
- Website: odishafc.com
Home colours	Away colours

Odisha Football Club ([oɽiˈsa]) is an Indian professional football club based in Bhubaneswar, Odisha, that competes in the Indian Super League, the top flight of the Indian football league system. The club plays its home matches at the Kalinga Stadium and is owned and operated by Dubai-based company GMS Leadership.

Odisha has established itself as one of the prominent football clubs in eastern India, since being founded as Delhi Dynamos in 2014. The club has played an important role in the development and promotion of professional football in the Odisha and has built a growing local supporter base, since establishing its base in Bhubaneswar. The club's supporters are represented by the Juggernauts, one of the prominent organised supporter groups associated with the club.

Odisha played its first home match on 14 October 2014, with a 0–0 draw against Pune City at the Jawaharlal Nehru Stadium in Delhi as Delhi Dynamos. As Odisha FC, the club played their first match on 22 October 2019, however they had to play their first three matches of 2019–20 ISL season at Shree Shiv Chhatrapati Sports Complex in Pune, before making Kalinga Stadium as their permanent base. The club went on to win the 2023 Indian Super Cup, its first trophy. After defeating Gokulam Kerala FC in the Indian club qualifiers for 2023–24 AFC Cup group stage 3–1, Odisha qualified for the 2023–24 AFC Cup, its first participation in any continental stage.

The club has also invested in the development of football beyond its senior men's team. Odisha FC operates a women's team, Odisha FC Women, which competes in the Indian Women's League. Its women's football programmes form part of the club's wider efforts to develop footballers and expand the sport's presence in Odisha. Odisha has competed in domestic competitions including the Indian Super League and the Super Cup, as well as representing India in Asian continental competition.

== History ==
=== Formation ===
In early 2014, it was announced that the All India Football Federation, the national federation for football in India, and IMG-Reliance would be accepting bids for ownership of eight or nine selected cities for the upcoming Indian Super League, an eight-team franchise league modeled along the lines of the Indian Premier League cricket tournament. On 13-April-2014, it was announced that DEN Networks had won the bidding for the Delhi franchise. The team had entered an alliance with Dutch club Feyenoord which lasted one year.

=== 2014−2019: Beginnings ===
The team started their inaugural Indian Super League campaign on 14 October 2014, with a 0–0 draw against FC Pune City at the Jawaharlal Nehru Stadium, New Delhi. Dynamos did not experience the best of starts to their ISL campaign as they were placed last in the points table till the ninth game-week. But, against all odds, the team finished fifth with a five-match unbeaten run which included three wins and two draws. However, the team could not qualify for the semi-finals. In the 2015 season, Delhi Dynamos, for the first time, qualified for the semi-finals of the Indian Super League in 2015. In the 2016 season, the club finished third in the league stage with 21 points, but lost to Kerala Blasters FC in the semi-finals. In the 2017–18 season, the club finished eighth in the league stage with 19 points and couldn't qualify for semi-finals. In their last season under the Delhi Dynamos banner, i.e. the 2018–19 season, the club again finished eighth in the league round with 18 points and therefore, couldn't qualify for the semi-finals.

=== 2019–2022: Rebranding and early seasons ===
Ahead of the 2019–20 Indian Super League, the club decided to relocate to a new base, the Kalinga Stadium in Bhubaneswar, Odisha and rebrand itself as Odisha FC. In the presence of Naveen Patnaik, the Chief Minister of Odisha, and Tusharkanti Behera, the Minister for Department of Sports and Youth Services (DSYS), Government of Odisha, the Delhi Soccer Private Limited signed a Memorandum of Understanding (MoU) with the Government of Odisha, to facilitate the relocation of the club from the national capital New Delhi to the Odisha state capital Bhubaneswar. As per the MoU, it was mutually decided that the club's first team, youth teams, youth football development program and grassroots football development program will be based in Odisha.

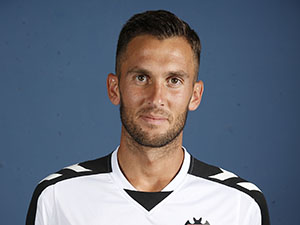
Carlos Delgado, captained the 2023 AIFF Super Cup winning side that secured club's first silverware, and led the side to victory in the Indian club qualifier for the 2023–24 AFC Cup, marking the club’s maiden Asian campaign.

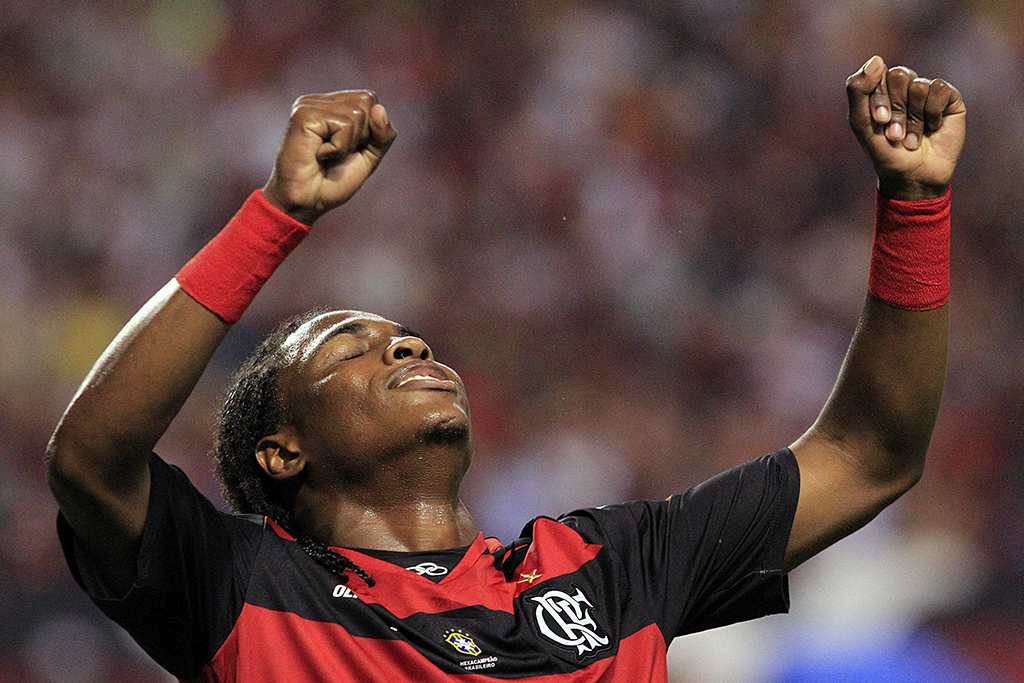
Diego Maurício, the all-time leading goal contributor for Odisha in all competitions with 60 goals and 19 assists in 111 appearances.

Jerry Mawihmingthanga, club's leading appearance maker with 131 appearances, and its leading Indian goal contributor with 20 goals and 19 assists.

Odisha played three of their initial home fixtures of the 2019−20 season at the Shree Shiv Chhatrapati Sports Complex Stadium in Pune, due to unavailability of the Kalinga Stadium in Bhubaneswar. Odisha started off their season on 22-October-2019, with a 2−1 loss in an away match against Jamshedpur at the JRD Tata Sports Complex. Odisha secured their first ever win in their third fixture registering a 4−2 victory against Mumbai City at the Mumbai Football Arena. Odisha ended the season at the sixth spot with 25 points. Later, on 18-March-2020, due to the head coach's familial obligations, Josep Gombau left the club. Stuart Baxter replaced Josep Gomabau on 19 June 2020, as he was announced as the head coach of Odisha in a two-year contract.

Due to the COVID-19 pandemic in India, the 2020−21 season was hosted behind closed doors across three venues in Goa, the Fatorda Stadium in Margao, the GMC Athletic Stadium in Bambolim, and the Tilak Maidan Stadium in Vasco da Gama. Due to inconsistent display throughout the season, Odisha FC ended up at the bottom of the league with twelve points. On 2 February 2021, Baxter was sacked for his comments in a post-match press conference.

On 6 May 2021, Odisha FC announced an association with former Spain international David Villa, who joined the club's Football Committee and was appointed Head of Global Football Operations. Villa's DV7 Group was brought in to assist with the club's footballing operations, including advising the coaching staff, player recruitment and development, and improving the club's Indian and youth players. Former Odisha FC head coach Josep Gombau and DV7 executive Víctor Oñate also joined club's Football Committee as part of the association. On 20 July 2021, Odisha announced the appointment of Kiko Ramírez as the head coach for 2021–22 Indian Super League along with the appointment of Assistant Coach and Head of Football Development, Joaquin "Kino" Garcia Sanchez. On 1 September 2021, the club entered into a 3-year international partnership deal with Premier League club Watford. On 4 November 2021, the club announced the finalisation of a strategic football and commercial partnership with Brazil's Avaí Futebol Clube as a part of OFC's Global Football Alliance initiative. Odisha began the 2021–22 season campaign win a historic 3–1 win over Bengaluru FC on 24-November. Odisha ended the season at the seventh spot with 23 points.

=== 2022–23: Gombau's return, and first-ever ISL play-off qualification ===
The 2022 Durand Cup kicked of the 2022–23 Indian football season, followed by the Indian Super League season, and later ended with the Super Cup. In the 2022 Durand Cup group stage, Odisha topped their group with four wins in four games, scoring 11 goals without conceding a single goal, and qualified for the 2022 Durand Cup quarter-finals. Odisha went down a.e.t. against Bengaluru in the quarter-finals 1–2, bowing out of the competition. In the 2022–23 Indian Super League season, Odisha finished 6th with 30 points on the table and qualified for the playoffs for the first time since rebranding into Odisha FC. However, they lost to Mohun Bagan 2-0 in the knockouts.

=== 2023: First breakthrough in Super Cup success under Clifford ===

The starting line-up for both the 2023 Super Cup Final and the 2023–24 AFC Cup Club Qualifier.

After the conclusion of the 2022–23 Indian Super League season, Odisha parted ways with head coach Josep Gombau on 11 March 2023, following club's exit from the ISL knockout stage. Clifford Miranda, who had served as Gombau's assistant during the season, was appointed interim head coach on 16 March 2023 ahead of the 2023 AIFF Super Cup.

In the 2023 Indian Super Cup, Odisha began their campaign by drawing 1–1 against East Bengal. They then went on to win 3–0 against I-League side Aizawl FC and a 2–1 win against Hyderabad FC to top their group and qualify for the Semi-final of the tournament. In the Semi-final, they beat the surprise team in the tournament NorthEast United 3-1 to qualify for their first ever Super Cup Final where they were up against Bengaluru.

On 25 April 2023, Odisha clinched their first ever silverware, the Indian Super Cup title, defeating Bengaluru FC 2–1 in the 2023 Indian Super Cup final. They faced 2021–22 I-League champions Gokulam Kerala in the Indian club qualifiers for 2023–24 AFC competitions. Diego Maurício's hat-trick helped Odisha cruise past Gokulam Kerala to qualify for the AFC Cup.

=== 2023–25: Historic Asian debut, and rise in ISL under Lobera ===
Odisha kicked-off their 2023–24 season with the 2023–24 AFC Cup, in which they were placed in the South Zone group alongside Mohun Bagan SG from India, Bashundhara Kings from Bangladesh, and Maziya from the Maldives. Odisha finished as the South Zone Winners, topping the group with 12 points from 6 games, qualifying for the inter-zonal play-off semi-finals. Odisha faced the Australian side Central Coast Mariners in the Inter-zone play-off semi-finals. They lost the first leg 0–4 away, and drew the second leg 0–0 at home, exiting the competition. In the 2023–24 Indian Super League season, the club finished 4th with 39 points from 22 games, qualifying for the play-offs. In the knockouts, they defeated Kerala Blasters 2–1 and reached the semi-finals for the first time in club history. In the two-legged semi-final, Odisha faced Mohun Bagan SG. They won the first leg 2–1 at home, however, lost 0–2 away, exiting the league play-offs with an aggregate score of 2–3.

Odisha kicked of their 2024–25 season with the 2024 Bandodkar Trophy, a pre-season invitational tournament in Goa. They topped their group, progressed through the knockout stages, defeating Brisbane Roar 2–1 in the semi-finals, and reached the final. However, they lost the title match to FC Goa 1–3 on penalties after a 3–3 draw and finished as runners-up of the trophy. In the 2024–25 Indian Super League, where the club under head coach Sergio Lobera ultimately finished seventh in the league, with 8 wins, 9 draws, and 7 losses, narrowly missing out on a playoff spot in a tightly contested campaign. Immediately after the league, Odisha FC competed in the 2025 AIFF Super Cup, but were eliminated early in the Round of 16, suffering a 0–3 defeat to Punjab FC at the Kalinga Stadium, ending their season without a cup run to salvage silverware.

=== 2025–: Rebuilding under T. G. Purushothaman ===
Kartik Hantal became the first-ever Odia player to score for the club.

Following the departure of Sergio Lobera in November 2025, Odisha entered the 2025–26 season amid a period of transition. The club appointed T. G. Purushothaman as head coach on 5 February 2026, ahead of the rescheduled 2025–26 Indian Super League season. Purushothaman joined Odisha after previously serving as an assistant coach and interim head coach of Kerala Blasters FC.

The 2025–26 season marked a difficult start to Purushothaman's tenure. Odisha opened their league campaign with a 1–1 draw against Chennaiyin FC at the Kalinga Stadium, with captain Carlos Delgado scoring the equaliser. Odisha finished the league phase in 11th place with 11 points, scoring 14 goals and conceding 22. The team ended the season with a 0–0 draw away to Jamshedpur FC on 21 May 2026, with goalkeeper Manas Dubey earning Player of the Match honors after making several saves to preserve a clean sheet. Kartik Hantal also made history by becoming the first Odia player to score for the club, finding the net against Punjab FC at home during the 2025–26 season.

Despite the difficult league campaign, several Indian players made significant contributions. Suhair Vadakkepeedika finished as Odisha's leading scorer with four goals, while Rahim Ali scored three goals and provided two assists. Lalthathanga Khawlhring and K. Lalrinfela contributed three assists each, establishing themselves as two of the team's principal creative outlets. The season ultimately represented a rebuilding period for Odisha, with Purushothaman tasked with reshaping the squad and restoring the club's competitiveness following consecutive seasons outside the league's top six.

Purushothaman continued as Odisha FC's head coach for the 2026–27 season, his second consecutive season in charge of the club. He remained in the role as Odisha prepared for the new campaign following a series of squad changes and player signings.

== Club crest and kits ==
=== Crest ===
On 15 September 2019, Odisha unveiled their official logo embodying the heritage and the culture of the state of Odisha and the vision and the ideology of its parent company, GMS Inc. The design for the crest is inspired from the Chakras or the chariot wheels of the famous Konark Sun Temple, a World Heritage Site in Odisha which represents movement and development; the ship design represents GMS, the world's largest buyer of ships and offshore assets, and the owner of the club.

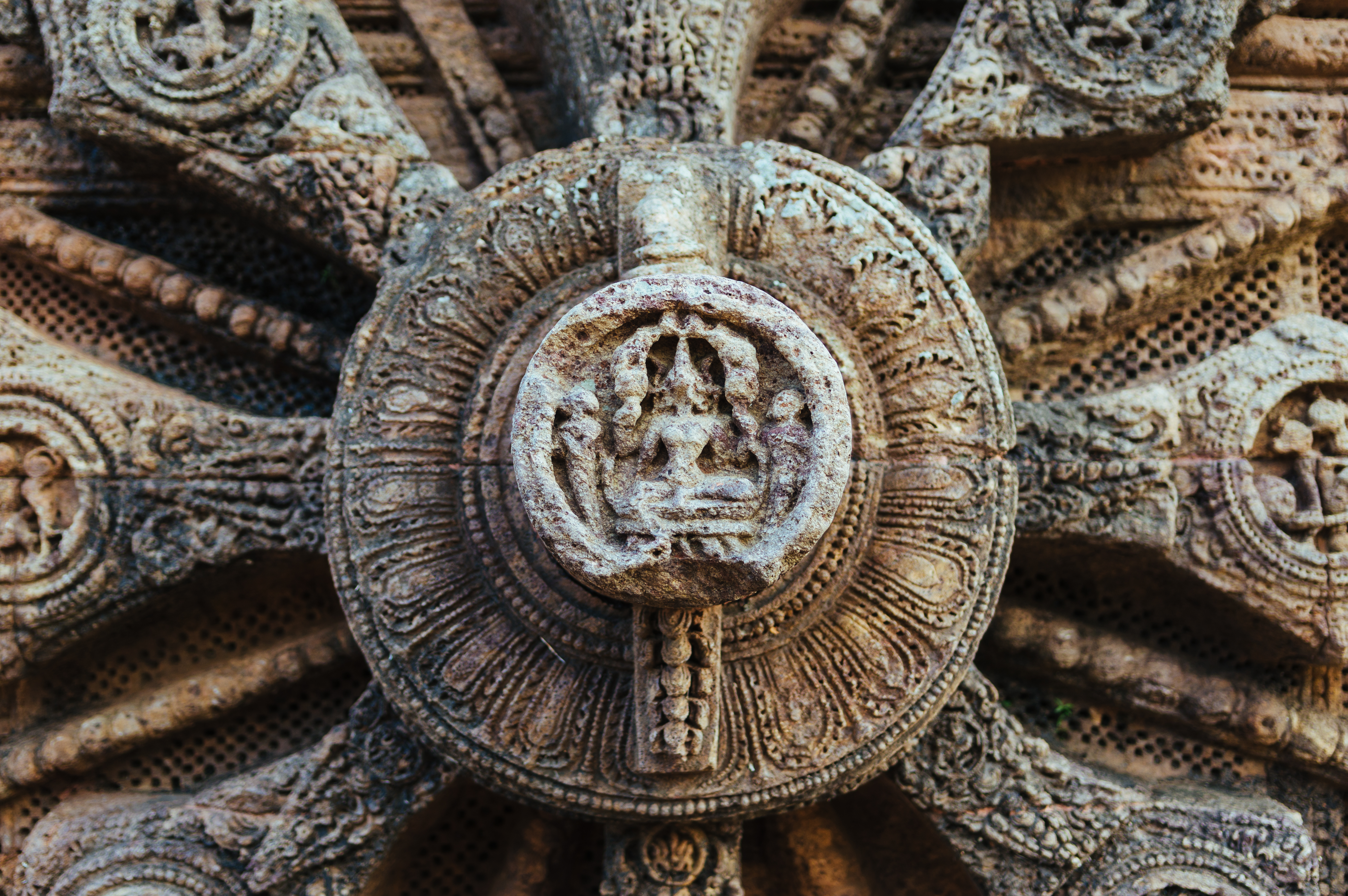
Center of a stone wheel engraved in the 13th-century-built Konark Sun Temple, a UNESCO World Heritage Site in Odisha, India.

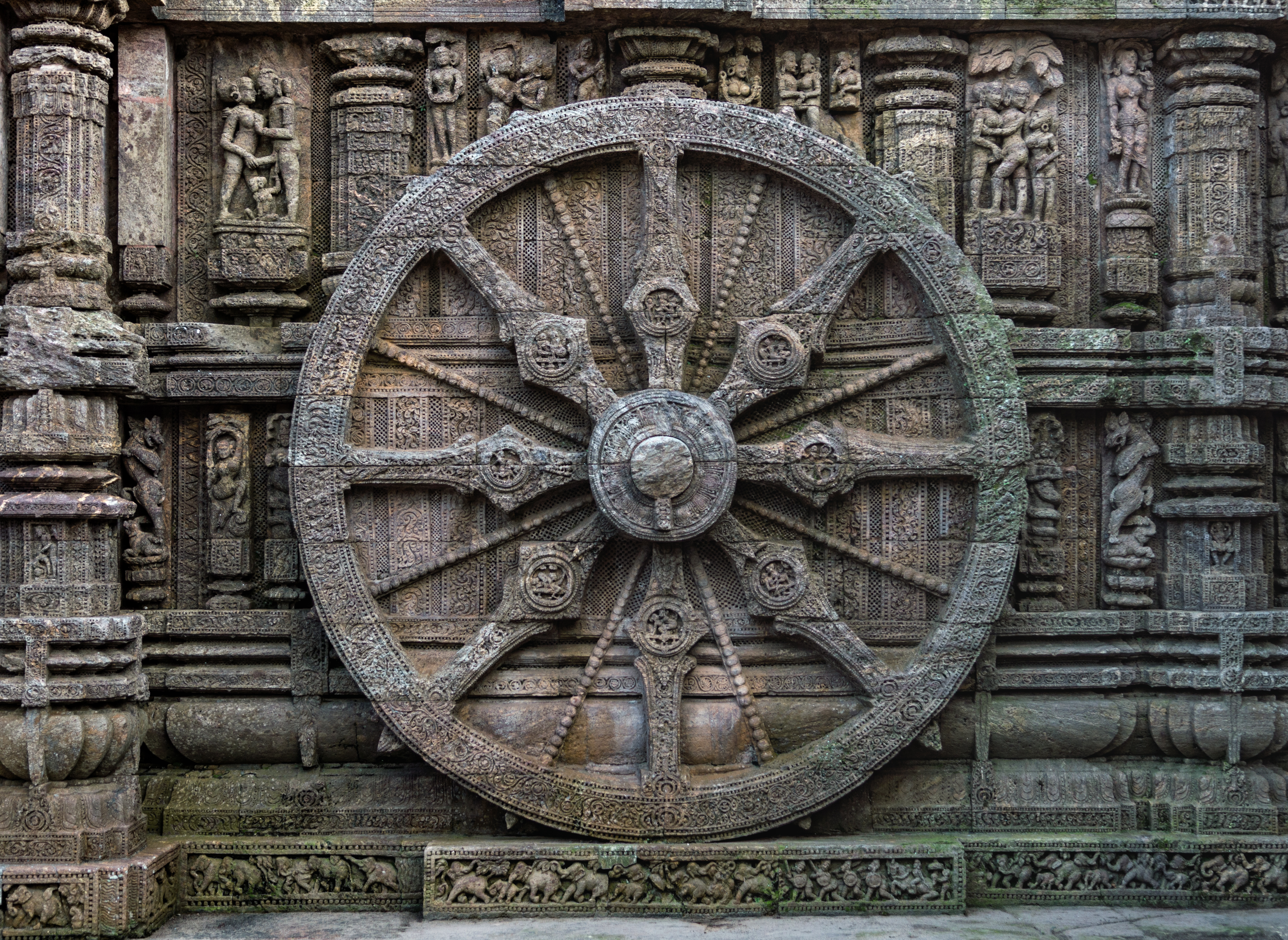
A stone wheel engraved in the walls of the temple which is designed as a chariot consisting of 24 such wheels.

Konark Sun Temple depicts this symbolism on a monumental scale, with 24 intricately carved stone wheels, each nearly 3.7 metres (12 ft) in diameter, and a chariot drawn by seven horses. Viewed from inland at dawn, as the sun rises over the horizon, the chariot-shaped temple evokes the image of the Sun God emerging from the depths of the blue sea. The temple is also known as the Black Pagoda, a name traditionally associated with its dark stone construction.

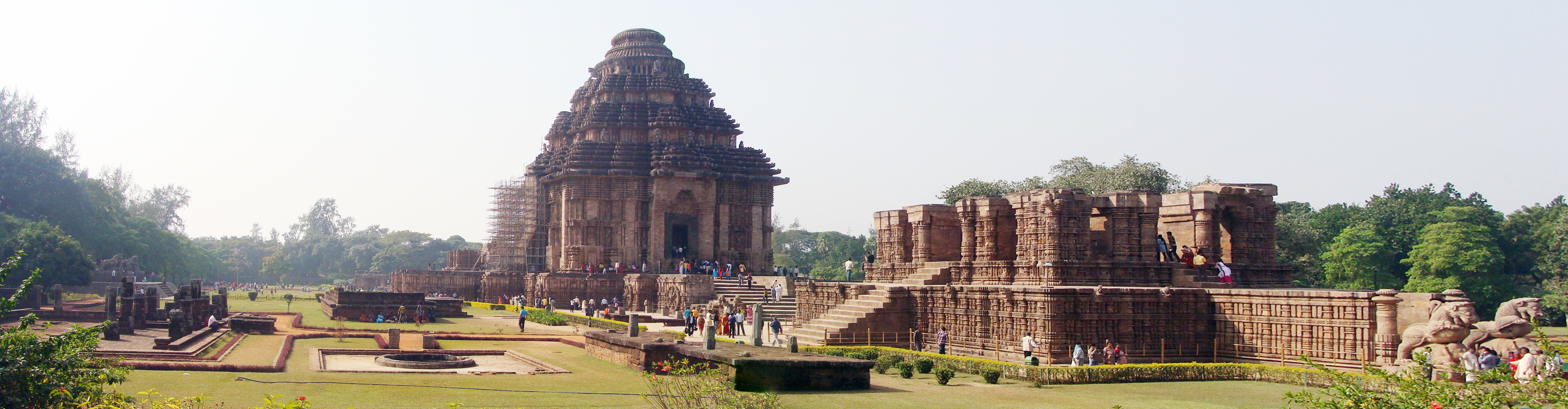
Panoramic view of the Konark Sun Temple from the southeast corner

=== Kit manufacturers and shirt sponsors ===
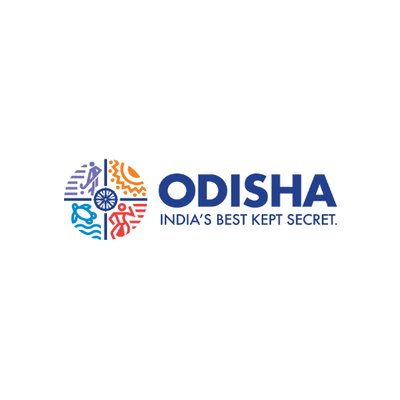
Odisha Tourism have been club's shirt sponsors since the 2019–20 season.

Period	Kit manufacturer	Shirt sponsor	Back sponsor
2014–15	Lotto	Freecharge	Cisco
2015–16	Puma	Ekana Sportz City	SpiceJet
2016–17	Dryworld	GMS	SpiceJet
2017–18	T10 Sports	Kent RO Systems	Jio
2018–19	TYKA	Andslite	–
2019–20	TYKA	Odisha Tourism	GMS
2020–21	T10 Sports	Odisha Tourism	GMS
2021–22	Hummel	Odisha Tourism	Atha Group
2022–24	Trak-Only	Odisha Tourism	Rungta Steel
2024–25	Trak-Only	Odisha Tourism	Lila Global
2025–26	Kaidos Sports	Odisha Tourism	DafaNews
2026–27	Kaidos Sports	Odisha Tourism	RFK Shipping

=== Kit evolution ===
==== Home kit ====
2014−15	2015−16	2016−18	2018−19	2019−20	2020−21	2021−22	2022−23	2023−24	2024−25	2025−26

== Stadium ==
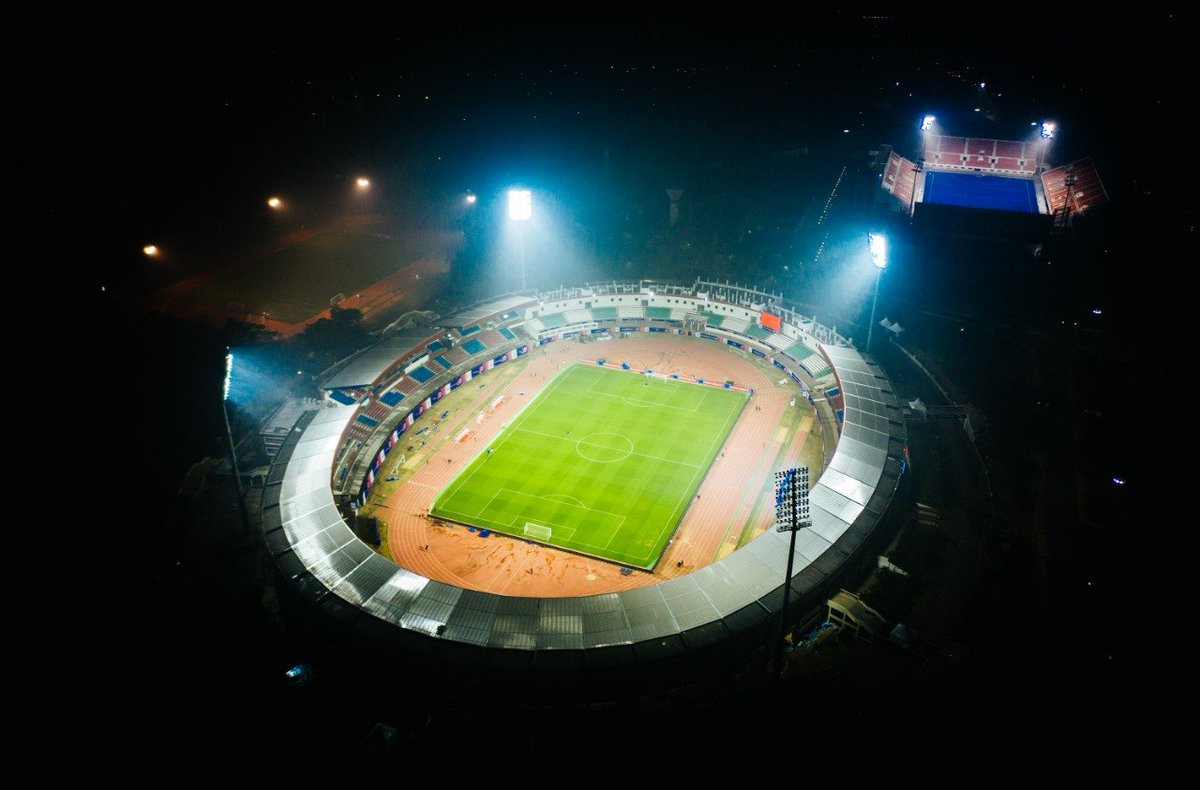
An elevated view of the Kalinga Stadium

The Kalinga Stadium in Bhubaneswar, Odisha, is the home ground of Odisha. Established in 1978, the stadium has a seating capacity of approximately 12,000 for football and has hosted numerous national and international football competitions, including the I-League, Super Cup, and the 2019 Gold Cup. It was also one of the venues for the 2022 FIFA U-17 Women's World Cup. The stadium is part of a larger sports complex that includes facilities for athletics, hockey, swimming and other sports.

The Kalinga Stadium was designated as Odisha's home ground on 31 August 2019, following the club's relocation from New Delhi to Bhubaneswar and its rebranding from Delhi Dynamos FC to Odisha FC. Prior to the relocation, the club played its home matches at the Jawaharlal Nehru Stadium in New Delhi. The move was undertaken amid declining attendances and financial challenges associated with operating in Delhi.

Since the relocation, Kalinga Stadium has been the club's primary home venue and has also hosted matches involving the India national football team and India's youth national teams. The stadium has additionally served as a home venue for other Odisha-based football teams, including Indian Arrows, the All India Football Federation's former developmental side.

Odisha FC's training facility is based in Bhubaneswar, with the Odisha Football Academy in Gajapati Nagar serving as the principal training centre for the club. The academy was inaugurated in 2023 alongside the Bhubaneswar Football Academy in Unit 1 and Capital Football Arena in Unit 9, and were developed to provide training facilities for Odisha FC's men's, women's and youth teams, as well as state and national teams. The facilities also include floodlighting, players' changing rooms, a gallery, gymnasium and coaches' rooms. Their proximity to one another allows multiple teams to train simultaneously, particularly during major football tournaments hosted in Bhubaneswar.

== Support ==
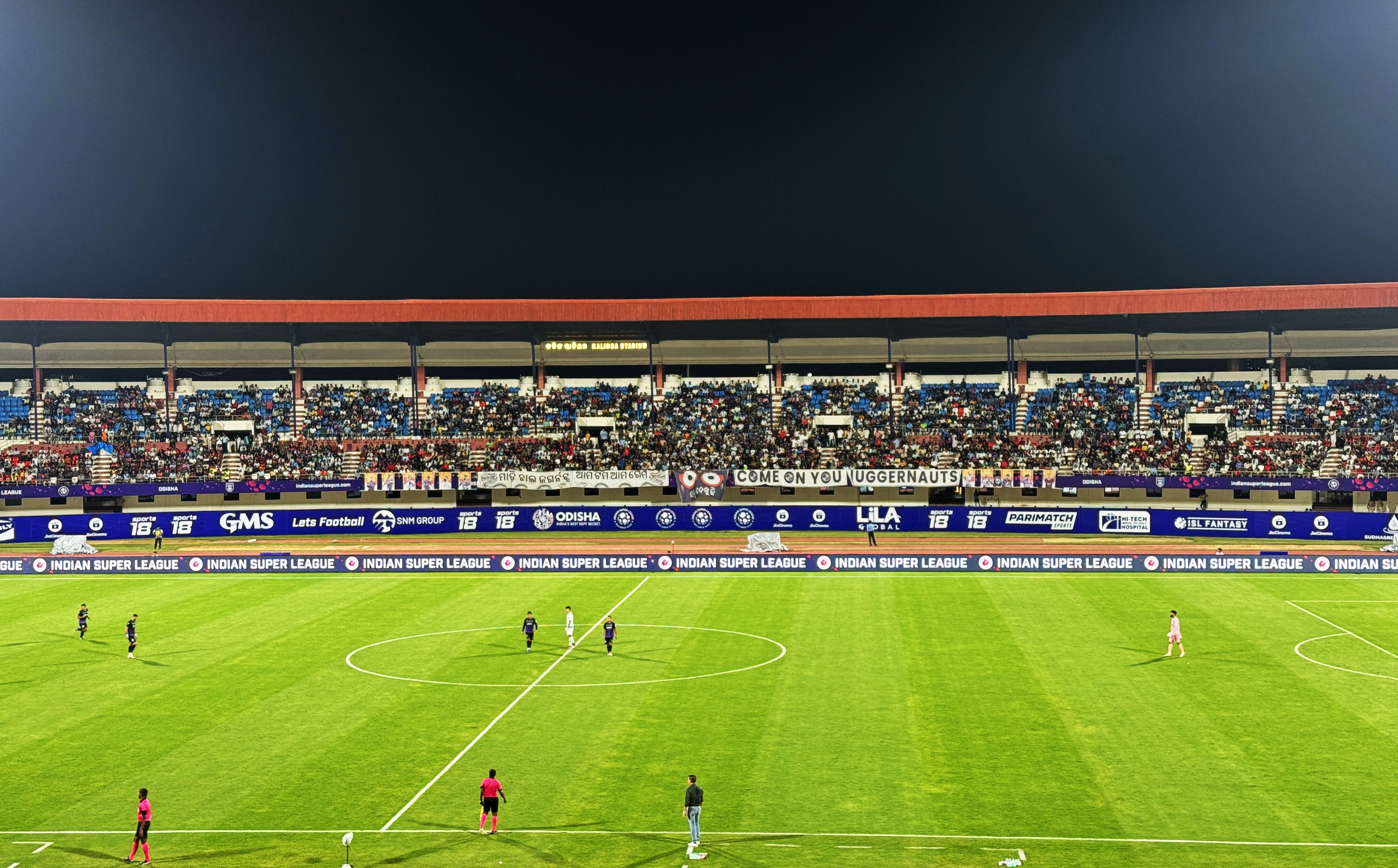
The Juggernauts, supporting Odisha in an Indian Super League game at the Kalinga Stadium.

Odisha FC had immediately grown its popularity post its inception which resulted in the formation of its supporters group, known as The Juggernauts. The group was formed in 2019 following the club's relocation from Delhi to Bhubaneswar and has since become the principal organised supporters' group of the club. The name Juggernauts is derived from Jagannātha, the presiding deity of Puri, whose name means "Lord of the World", from the Sanskrit words jagata ("world") and nātha ("lord"). The English word "juggernaut" also denotes a large and powerful force or organisation that is difficult to stop.

The Juggernauts established a prominent presence at the Kalinga Stadium during Odisha's first season in Bhubaneswar. They have organised coordinated support during home matches and have also travelled to away fixtures and organised public screenings for matches played outside Bhubaneswar. During the club's inaugural season in Bhubaneswar, the group developed chants and organised vocal support that contributed to the atmosphere at the Kalinga Stadium.

In September 2021, The Juggernauts entered into an international supporters' alliance with Watford F.C.'s supporters' group The 1881 Movement as part of a cross-cultural fan-exchange programme. The initiative followed Odisha FC's three-year international club partnership with Watford and was reported as the first international alliance between an Indian football supporters' group and a supporters' group of a foreign club.

Following the establishment of Odisha FC Women in 2022, the Juggernauts extended their organised support to the women's team and have attended and supported matches involving the side.

In 2023, the Juggernauts Sporting Foundation was incorporated as a private non-government company in Odisha. The organisation is registered as a Section 8 company under the Companies Act, 2013 and describes its activities as including sports events, fan engagement, grassroots sports development, community initiatives, sports journalism and charitable work involving sport. The foundation was incorporated on 7 August 2023 and is based in Bhubaneswar.

The Juggernauts have consequently developed from a match-going supporters' group into a broader supporter and community organisation, combining organised support for Odisha FC with activities involving grassroots sport, community engagement, environmental awareness and social inclusion.

== Rivalries ==
Odisha FC’s rivalry with Bengal clubs Mohun Bagan SG and East Bengal has grown largely through competitive matches and shared high-stake clashes on the pitch in top-tier Indian football competitions, i.e. in the Indian Super League and AIFF Super Cup. Odisha's fiery clash with East Bengal in the 2024 Super Cup final has ignited a rivalry among fans, especially on social media. This has continued in following fixtures between the two clubs.

=== Head-to-Head ===
Opposition	Matches	Won	Drawn	Lost	GF	GA	Win%	Draw%	Loss%
East Bengal	13	8	2	3	31	26	61.5%	15.4%	23.1%
Mohun Bagan	16	2	6	8	13	28	12.5%	37.5%	50.0%

== Ownership ==
On 13 April 2014, Indian Super League announced that DEN Networks had won the bidding for the Delhi franchise, which became one of the eight founding teams of the league. The franchise was operated through DEN Soccer, a subsidiary of DEN Sports & Entertainment, and competed as Delhi Dynamos FC.

In 2015, the club entered into a technical alliance with Dutch club Feyenoord, which lasted for one season. In March 2016, DEN Networks agreed to sell a 55% stake in DEN Sports & Entertainment to Wall Street Investments Limited for ₹43.32 crore. Wall Street Investments represented the interests of the Dubai-based GMS Inc., a company founded by Dr. Anil Sharma with interests in the shipping and ship-recycling industries.

The transaction was completed in March 2016, with DEN Networks retaining a 45% stake. In November 2016, Wall Street Investments acquired a further 25% stake from DEN Networks, increasing its holding to 80% and reducing DEN Networks' stake to 20%. The club's corporate entities were subsequently renamed Delhi Sports & Entertainment and Delhi Soccer Private Limited.

By the time of the club's relocation to Odisha in 2019, GMS was the sole owner of the franchise. The club's operating company, Delhi Soccer Private Limited, entered into a five-year agreement with the Government of Odisha on 31 August 2019 to relocate the franchise from Delhi to Bhubaneswar and rebrand it as Odisha Football Club. The agreement established Kalinga Stadium as the club's new home venue. The relocation did not represent a change in ownership, with Odisha FC continuing under the ownership of GMS Inc.

The club has subsequently described itself as wholly owned by GMS Inc., which remains its owner. GMS's ownership of Odisha FC has continued alongside the club's development in Bhubaneswar, including its expansion into youth and women's football and its participation in domestic and continental competitions.

== Records and statistics ==
=== Overview ===
As of 24 October 2026

Season	Indian Super League									AIFF Super Cup	Top Scorer	
Season	P	W	D	L	GF	GA	Pts	Position	Playoffs	AIFF Super Cup	Player	Goals
Delhi Dynamos
2014	14	4	6	4	16	14	18	5th	—	—	(Brazil) Gustavo Marmentini	5
2015	14	6	4	4	15	11	20	4th	Semi-finals	—	(Ghana) Richard Gadze (India) Robin Singh	4
2016	14	5	6	3	27	17	21	3rd	Semi-finals	—	(Brazil) Marcelinho	10
2017–18	18	5	4	9	27	37	19	8th	—	Qualifiers	(Nigeria) Kalu Uche	14
2018–19	18	4	6	8	23	27	18	8th	—	Quarter-finals	(India) Daniel Lalhlimpuia (India) Lallianzuala Chhangte	5
Odisha
2019–20	18	7	4	7	28	31	25	6th	—	—	(Spain) Aridane Santana	9
2020–21	20	2	6	12	25	44	12	11th	—	—	(Brazil) Diego Maurício	12
2021–22	20	6	5	9	31	43	23	7th	—	—	(Brazil) Jonathas de Jesus	8
2022–23	20	9	3	8	30	32	30	6th	Knockouts	Champions	(Brazil) Diego Maurício	22
2023–24	22	11	6	5	35	23	39	4th	Semi-finals	Runners-up	(Brazil) Diego Maurício	17
2024–25	24	8	9	7	44	37	33	7th	—	Round of 16	(Brazil) Diego Maurício	9
2025–26	13	2	5	6	14	22	11	11th	—	—	(India) Suhair Vadakkepeedika	4
2026–27	3	0	2	1	2	3	2	8th	—	—	(India) Thoiba Singh Moirangthem	1

=== Performance in AFC competitions ===
Season	Competition	Round	Opposition	Home	Away	Position	Top scorer(s)	Goals
2023–24
2023–24	AFC Cup	Group Stage	(India) Mohun Bagan SG	0–4	5–2	South Zone Winners	(Senegal) Mourtada Fall	4
2023–24	AFC Cup	Group Stage	(Bangladesh) Bashundhara Kings	1–0	2–3	South Zone Winners	(Senegal) Mourtada Fall	4
2023–24	AFC Cup	Group Stage	(Maldives) Maziya S&RC	6–1	3–2	South Zone Winners	(Senegal) Mourtada Fall	4
2023–24	AFC Cup	Knock-outs	(Australia) Central Coast Mariners	0–0	0–4	Inter-zone Semi-finalists	(Senegal) Mourtada Fall	4

=== Notable wins against foreign teams ===
As of matches played on 3 September 2024

Season	Competition	Round	Opposition	Score	Venue	City	Ref
2023–24	AFC Cup	Group Stage	(Maldives) Maziya	6–1	Kalinga Stadium	Bhubaneswar	
2023–24	AFC Cup	Group Stage	(Maldives) Maziya	3–2	Galolhu Rasmee Dhandu Stadium	Malé	
2023–24	AFC Cup	Group Stage	(Bangladesh) Bashundhara Kings	1–0	Kalinga Stadium	Bhubaneswar	
2024–25	Bandodkar Trophy	Group Stage	(Argentina) Defensa y Justicia	2–1	Fatorda Stadium	Margao	
2024–25	Bandodkar Trophy	Semi-finals	(Australia) Brisbane Roar	2–1	Fatorda Stadium	Margao	

== Players ==
=== First-team squad ===
As of 12 October 2026

Note: Flags indicate national team as defined under FIFA eligibility rules; some limited exceptions apply. Players may hold more than one non-FIFA nationality.

No.	Pos.	Nation	Player
1	GK	IND	Vishnu Prasath
3	DF	IND	Subham Bhattacharya
6	DF	IND	Saurabh Bhanwala
7	MF	IND	Lalthathanga Khawlhring (Captain)
8	FW	BRA	Everton
9	FW	IND	Kartik Hantal
10	FW	IND	Rahul KP
11	FW	IND	Rahim Ali
12	MF	ESP	Manu Molina
13	DF	IND	Saviour Gama
15	FW	IND	VP Suhair
16	DF	IND	Tejas Krishna
17	FW	IND	Imran Khan
18	FW	IND	Ritwik Das
19	MF	IND	Sanathoi Singh Heikrujam
20	MF	IND	Arjun Makkoth Mohanan

No.	Pos.	Nation	Player
22	FW	IND	Nandhakumar Sekar
23	DF	IND	Jeremy Zohminghlua
24	DF	IND	Thoiba Singh Moirangthem
25	MF	IND	K Lalrinfela
29	MF	GEO	Giorgi Aburjania
31	GK	IND	Sachin Suresh
33	MF	IND	Edwin Sydney Vanspaul
34	DF	IND	Vanlalzuidika Chhakchhuak
39	MF	IND	Narendra Naik
44	DF	IND	Raj Kumar Sanyasi
47	DF	IND	Aashir Salim Vazhappilli
55	GK	IND	Hrithik Tiwari
66	DF	NGR	Stephen Eze
77	FW	IND	Nihal Sudeesh
93	FW	PLE	Mahmoud Eid
99	GK	IND	Manas Dubey

=== Out on loan ===
Note: Flags indicate national team as defined under FIFA eligibility rules; some limited exceptions apply. Players may hold more than one non-FIFA nationality.

No.	Pos.	Nation	Player

=== Player of the Season Awardees ===
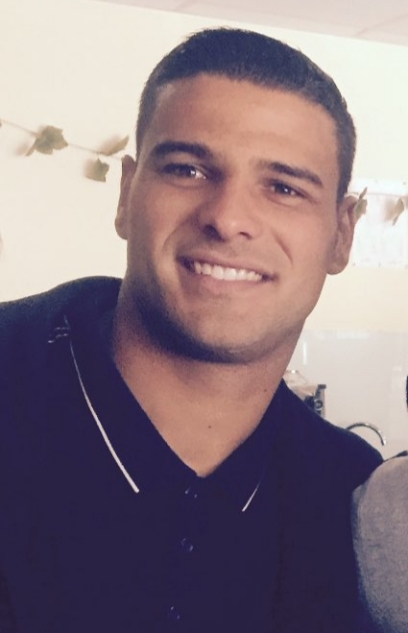
Aridane Santana, the first recipient of the club's Player of the Season award, for the 2019–20 season.

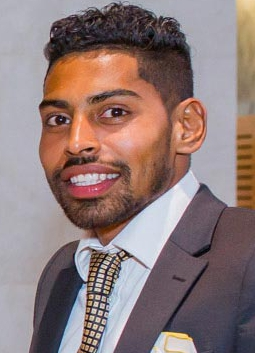
Roy Krishna, the latest recipient of the club's Player of the Season award, for the 2023–24 season.

This award is an individual award presented annually by the club in recognition of the player considered to have made the most significant contribution to the club's performances during a season. The award has been presented on only three occasions since the club's establishment, making it a relatively rare individual honour at the club.

Season	Player	Nationality	Position	Refs.
2019–20	Aridane Santana	Spain	Forward	
2022–23	Diego Maurício	Brazil	Forward	
2023–24	Roy Krishna	Fiji	Forward	

=== Club Records ===
==== Most Appearances ====
Rank	Player	League	Others	Total
1	(India) Jerry Mawihmingthanga	112	19	131
2	(Spain) Carlos Delgado	91	23	114
3	(Brazil) Diego Maurício	86	25	111
4	(India) Thoiba Singh Moirangthem	84	14	98
5	(India) Nandhakumar Sekar	83	15	98

==== Most Goals ====
Rank	Player	League	Others	Total
1	(Brazil) Diego Maurício	44	16	60
2	(India) Jerry Mawihmingthanga	17	3	20
3	(Fiji) Roy Krishna	15	3	18
4	(India) Nandhakumar Sekar	10	6	16
5	(India) Isak Vanlalruatfela	10	4	14

==== Most Assists ====
Rank	Player	League	Others	Total
1	(Brazil) Diego Maurício	13	6	19
2	(India) Jerry Mawihmingthanga	16	3	19
3	(Morocco) Ahmed Jahouh	8	8	16
4	(India) Nandhakumar Sekar	11	3	14
5	(India) Isak Vanlalruatfela	10	2	12

== Personnel ==
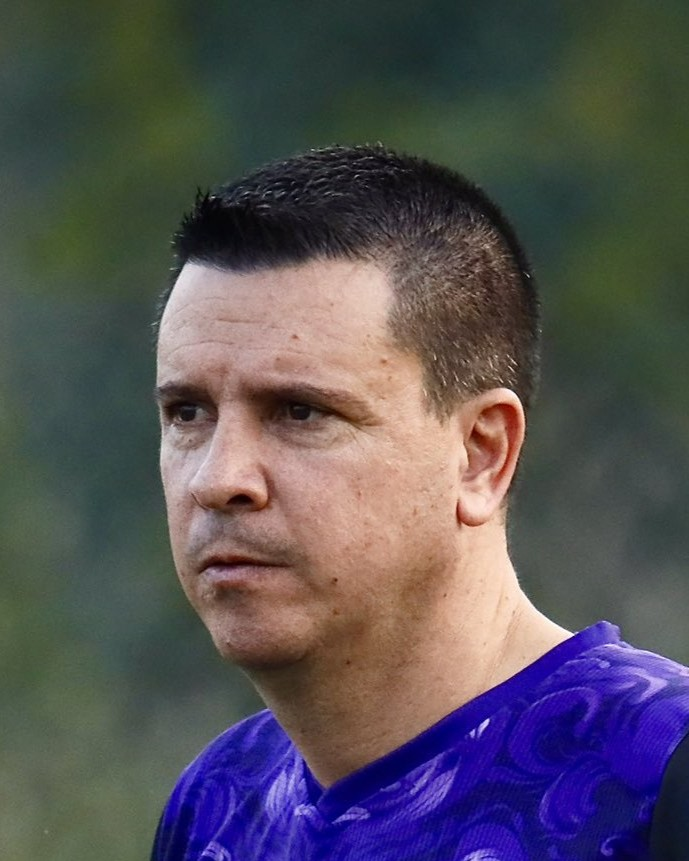
Sergio Lobera, club's most successful head coach by points per game.

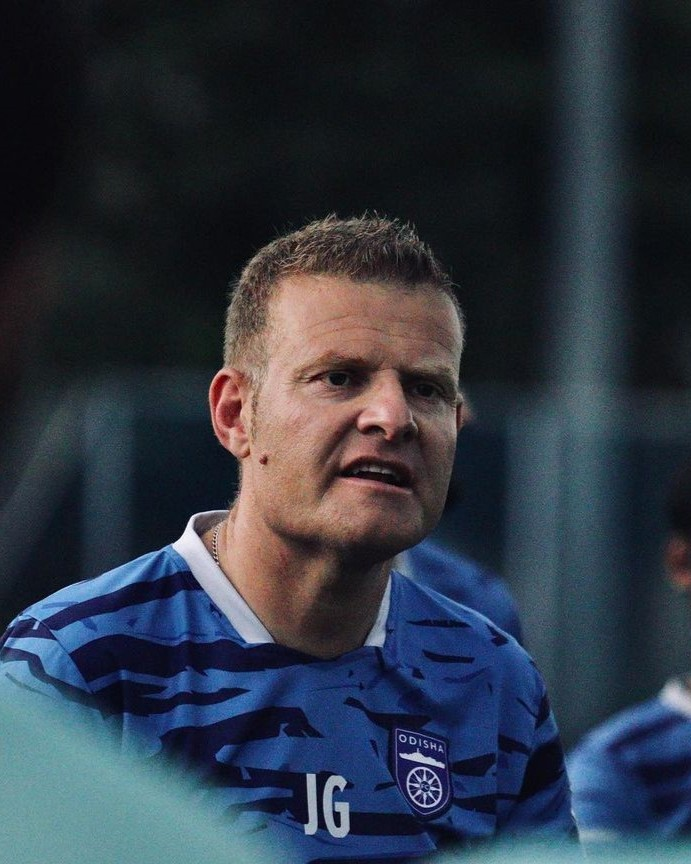
Josep Gombau, club's first head coach after rebranding in 2019 and one of the most successful head coaches in club's history.

=== Current technical staff ===
Position	Name
Head coach	(India) T. G. Purushothaman
Assistant Coach	(India) Kiran G. Krishnan
Goalkeeping Coach	(India) Saji Joy
Strength & Conditioning Coach	(India) Anugrah Suresh
Team Manager	(India) Karan Rawal
Physiotherapist	(India) Venkadesh Rethinaswamy
Team Analyst	(India) Kiran K. Narayanan
Welness Mentor	(India) Amrit Pattojoshi

=== Managerial history ===
Name	Nationality	Period
Harm van Veldhoven	Belgium	2014
Roberto Carlos	Brazil	2015
Gianluca Zambrotta	Italy	2016
Miguel Ángel Portugal	Spain	2017–2018
Josep Gombau	Spain	2018–2020
Stuart Baxter	Scotland	2020–2021
Kiko Ramírez	Spain	2021–2022
Josep Gombau	Spain	2022–2023
Clifford Miranda	India	2023
Sergio Lobera	Spain	2023–2025
T. G. Purushothaman	India	2026–

== Management ==
Position	Name	Refs.
Club Director	(United States) Rohan Sharma	
Club President & CEO	(India) Ashish Shah	
Chief Operating Officer	(India) Ravi Khedar	
Head of Finance	(India) Ajit Panda	
Senior Manager - Club Operations	(India) Bishes Panda	
Commercial Manager	(India) Ashis Hota	
Technical Assistant	(India) Joy Gabriel	

== Honours ==
=== Domestic ===
==== Cup ====
- Indian Super Cup
  - Winners (1): 2023
  - Runners-up (1): 2024

=== Regional ===
- Bandodkar Trophy
  - Runners-up (1): 2024

== Affiliated clubs ==
The following clubs are affiliated with Odisha FC:

- (England) Watford FC (2021–present)
- (Brazil) Avai FC (2021–present)

== Other departments ==
=== eSports ===
The organizers of ISL introduced eISL, a FIFA video game tournament, for the ISL playing clubs. Each club has represented in the game by two players. Odisha FC (the eSports section is now defunct), hosted a series of qualifying games for all the participants desiring to represent the club in eISL.
