= 2018–19 Mumbai City FC season =

2018–19 football season for Mumbai City Football Club

Mumbai City FC
2018–19 season
- Owner: Ranbir Kapoor; Bimal Parekh
- Manager: Jorge Costa
- Stadium: Mumbai Football Arena
- ISL: 3rd (semi-finals)
- Super Cup: Round of 16
- Top goalscorer: Modou Sougou (12)

The 2018–19 Mumbai City FC season was the club's fifth season since its establishment in 2014 and their fifth season in the Indian Super League.

== Pre-season and friendlies ==
On 31 August 2018, Mumbai City started their pre season in Thailand. They played with local clubs Chiangmai FC, Lampang F.C., Maejo United F.C. and Bangkok United F.C.

2 September 2018 Friendly	Chiangmai FC	2–2	Mumbai City	Chiang Mai, Thailand
16:00 IST	Pichai Thongvilad 61'; Seo Dong-hyeon 90'	Report	Bipin 76' 84'	Stadium: Alpine Resorts Grounds

5 September 2018 Friendly	Maejo United F.C.	1–3	Mumbai City	Chiang Mai, Thailand
16:00 IST	Didkad 68'	Report	Sougou 25'; Bastos 63'; Alen 73'	Stadium: Alpine Resorts Grounds

9 September 2018 Friendly	Lampang F.C.	2–6	Mumbai City	Chiang Mai, Thailand
15:00 IST	Bell; 62' (pen.): Choklap Nilsang; 90'	Report	Sougou 14', 53', 58', 66'; Bastos 30' (pen.); Pranjal Bhumij; 88'	Stadium: Alpine Resorts Grounds

13 September 2018 Friendly	Bangkok United F.C.	2–3	Mumbai City	Bangkok, Thailand
16:30 IST	Ekkachai Sumrei; 33': Sathaporn Daengsee; 83'	Report	Sougou 4'; Raynier 37'; Pranjal Bhumij; 71'	Stadium: Thammasat Stadium

== Players ==
=== Current squad ===
As of 5 June 2018

Note: Flags indicate national team as defined under FIFA eligibility rules; some limited exceptions apply. Players may hold more than one non-FIFA nationality.

No.	Pos.	Nation	Player
1	GK	(India) IND	Amrinder Singh
21	GK	(India) IND	Ravi Kumar
30	GK	(India) IND	Kunal Sawant
15	DF	(India) IND	Subashish Bose
3	DF	(India) IND	Shouvik Ghosh
5	DF	(India) IND	Anwar Ali
23	DF	(India) IND	Souvik Chakrabarti
18	DF	(Romania) ROU	Lucian Goian
4	DF	(Serbia) SRB	Marko Klisura
37	DF	(India) IND	Bikramjeet Singh
32	DF	(India) IND	Davinder Singh

No.	Pos.	Nation	Player
8	MF	(India) IND	Mohammed Rafique
6	MF	(India) IND	Milan Singh
29	MF	(India) IND	Bipin Singh
11	MF	(India) IND	Raynier Fernandes
10	MF	(Uruguay) URU	Matías Mirabaje
55	MF	(Portugal) POR	Paulo Machado
26	MF	(India) IND	Sehnaj Singh
19	MF	(India) IND	Vignesh Dakshinamurthi
25	FW	(India) IND	Alen Deory
12	FW	(India) IND	Sanju Pradhan
16	FW	(Brazil) BRA	Rafael Bastos
17	FW	(India) IND	Pranjal Bhumij

=== Foreign players ===
The number of foreign players allowed in the squad will be reduced from eight to seven from 2018 to 2019 season, however the maximum number of foreign players allowed on the pitch will remain same at five.

Club	Foreigner 1	Foreigner 2	Foreigner 3	Foreigner 4	Foreigner 5	Foreigner 6	Foreigner 7
Mumbai City	(Brazil) Rafael Bastos	(Democratic Republic of the Congo) Arnold Issoko	(Portugal) Paulo Machado	(Romania) Lucian Goian	(Senegal) Modou Sougou	(Serbia) Marko Klisura	(Uruguay) Matías Mirabaje

== Competitions ==
=== Indian Super League ===
==== League table ====
Pos	Team	Pld	W	D	L	GF	GA	GD	Pts	Qualification
1	Bengaluru (Note: Qualified for 2020 AFC Cup qualifying play-offs) (C)	18	10	4	4	29	22	+7	34 (Note: Head-to-head standings: Bengaluru 6 pts, Goa 0 pts.)	Advance to ISL Playoffs
2	Goa	18	10	4	4	36	20	+16	34	Advance to ISL Playoffs
3	Mumbai City	18	9	3	6	25	20	+5	30	Advance to ISL Playoffs
4	NorthEast United	18	7	8	3	22	18	+4	29	Advance to ISL Playoffs
5	Jamshedpur	18	6	9	3	29	21	+8	27	

Source: Indian Super League
Rules for classification: 1) points; 2) head-to-head points; 3) head-to-head goal difference; 4) head-to-head goals scored; 5) goal difference; 5) number of goals scored; 6) fair play ranking; 6) drawing of lots
(C) ISL Cup winners

=== Indian Super Cup ===
16 March 2018 Qualification round	Mumbai City	2–1 (a.e.t.)	Indian Arrows	Kalinga Stadium, Bhubaneswar
17:00 IST	Emaná 90' (pen.); Santos 104'	Report	Praveen 77'	Attendance: 3,000; Referee: Ajitkumar Lairenlakpam

5 April 2018 Round of 16	Mumbai City	1–2	East Bengal	Kalinga Stadium, Bhubaneswar
20:00 IST	Emaná 22'	Report	Yusa 26'; Amnah 73'	Attendance: 4,354; Referee: Venkatesh R
