= 2018–19 ATK season =

5th season in existence of ATK

ATK
2018–19 season
- Owners: Kolkata Games and Sports Pvt. Ltd.
- Head Coach: Steve Coppell
- Stadium: Salt Lake Stadium
- Indian Super League: 6th
- Super Cup: Semi-final
- Top goalscorer: League: Manuel Lanzarote (5); All: Manuel Lanzarote (7)
- Highest home attendance: 41,202
- Lowest home attendance: 15,333
- Average home league attendance: 21,885
Home colours	Away colours	Third colours

The 2018–19 ATK season was the club's fifth season since its establishment in 2014 and their fifth season in the Indian Super League. The fifth edition of ISL commenced with a new look ATK renewing its seasonal rivalry against Kerala Blasters FC on Saturday, 29 September, at the Vivekananda Yuba Bharati Krirangan.

== Background ==
=== Transfers ===
After a disappointing season, ATK has appointed Sanjoy Sen as their mentor to recruit national players. The former Mohun Bagan A.C. head coach roped in some of his own former players who he had the experience of working with, along with former ATK players Arnab Mondal and Cavin Lobo.

=== In ===
Note: Flags indicate national team as defined under FIFA eligibility rules; some limited exceptions apply. Players may hold more than one non-FIFA nationality.

No.	Pos.	Nation	Player
—	GK	IND	Arindam Bhattacharya
—	GK	IND	Avilash Paul
—	DF	ENG	John Johnson
—	DF	BRA	Gerson Vieira
—	DF	IND	Arnab Mondal
—	DF	IND	Aiborlang Khongjee
—	DF	IND	Sena Ralte
—	DF	IND	Ricky Lallawmawma
—	DF	IND	Ankit Mukherjee
—	MF	IND	Pronay Halder
—	MF	MAR	Noussair El Maimouni

No.	Pos.	Nation	Player
—	MF	IND	Malsawmzuala
—	MF	IND	Sheikh Faiaz
—	MF	IND	Cavin Lobo
—	MF	ESP	Manuel Lanzarote
—	FW	IND	Yumnam Gopi Singh
—	FW	IND	Balwant Singh
—	FW	NGA	Kalu Uche
7	FW	BRA	Everton Santos

== Pre Season and friendlies ==
ATK went to Spain on 18 August for their pre-season. This campaign will end on 15 September. In Spain they played some friendly matches with local clubs and one match with Premier League club Fulham F.C.

They played their first match on 31 August with Lorca FC and won by one goal scored by Kalu Uche. In the second friendly they won by one goal again by defeating Spanish club Real Murcia. ATK played their third match with highly competitive Premier League club Fulham F.C. and defeated just by a whisker.

31 August 2018 Friendly	ATK	1–0	(Spain) Lorca FC	Murcia, Spain
22:30 IST	Kalu Uche 62'	Report		Stadium: Pinatar Arena; Referee: Salvador Lax Franco

4 September 2018 Friendly	(Spain) Real Murcia	0–1	ATK	Murcia, Spain
22:30 IST		Report	Balwant Singh 41'	Stadium: Pinatar Arena

8 September 2018 Friendly	ATK	0–1	(England) Fulham	Murcia, Spain
15:30 IST		Report	Andre Schurrle 71'	Stadium: Pinatar Arena Stadium

11 September 2018 Friendly	ATK	5–2	(Spain) CD Almunecar City	Murcia, Spain
22:30 IST	Kalu Uche 25' (Pen.), 34', 73', 79'; Jayesh Rane 60'	Report	67'; 86'	Stadium: Pinatar Arena

13 September 2018 Friendly	ATK	0–3	(Spain) FC Jumilla	Murcia, Spain
14:00 IST		Report	Alex martinez 26'; Boubacar Hanne 45'; Carlos Álvarez 74'	Stadium: Pinatar Arena; Referee: Martínez Montalbán

== Competitions ==
=== Indian Super League ===
==== Table ====
Pos	Team	Pld	W	D	L	GF	GA	GD	Pts	Qualification
4	NorthEast United	18	7	8	3	22	18	+4	29	Advance to ISL Playoffs
5	Jamshedpur	18	6	9	3	29	21	+8	27	
6	ATK	18	6	6	6	18	22	−4	24	
7	Pune City	18	6	4	8	24	30	−6	22	
8	Delhi Dynamos	18	4	6	8	23	27	−4	18	

Source: Indian Super League
Rules for classification: 1) points; 2) head-to-head points; 3) head-to-head goal difference; 4) head-to-head goals scored; 5) goal difference; 5) number of goals scored; 6) fair play ranking; 6) drawing of lots

==== Matches ====
29 September 2018 1	ATK (India)	0–2	(India) Kerala Blasters FC	Kolkata, India
19:30 IST (UTC+5:30)			Matej Poplatnik 77'; Slavisa Stojanovic 86'	Stadium: Vivekananda Yuba Bharati Krirangan; Attendance: 41,202

4 October 2018 2	ATK (India)	0-1	(India) Northeast United FC	Kolkata, India
19:30 IST (UTC+5:30)			Rowllin Borges 89'	Stadium: Vivekananda Yuba Bharati Krirangan; Attendance: 19,853

17 October 2018 3	Delhi Dynamos FC (India)	1-2	(India) ATK	New Delhi, India
19:30 IST (UTC+5:30)	Pritam Kotal 54'		Balwant Singh 20'; Noussair El Maimouni 84'	Stadium: Jawaharlal Nehru Stadium; Attendance: 9,143

21 October 2018 4	Jamshedpur FC (India)	1-1	(India) ATK	Jamshedpur, India
19:30 IST (UTC+5:30)	Sergio Cidoncha 35'		Manuel Lanzarote 45'	Stadium: JRD Tata Sports Complex; Attendance: 22,812

26 October 2018 5	ATK	2–1	Chennaiyin	Kolkata
19:00	Uche 3'; Johnson 13'; Halder (yellow card) 27'; Singh (yellow card) 60'; Bhattacharya (yellow card) 72'; Lanzarote (yellow card) 83'	Summary	Salom 17'	Stadium: Salt Lake Stadium; Attendance: 15,382; Referee: Ajit Meetei

31 October 2018 6	ATK	1–2	Bengaluru	Kolkata
19:30	Singh (yellow card) 13'; Thatal 15'; Bhattacharya (yellow card) 33'; Halder (yellow card) 84'	Summary	Miku 45+3'; Paartalu 47' (yellow card) 49'; Kumar (yellow card) 57'; Juanan (yellow card) 89'	Stadium: Salt Lake Stadium; Attendance: 17,656; Referee: R Venkatesh

10 November 2018 7	ATK	1–0	Pune City	Kolkata
19:30	Gerson 82'	Summary	Kuruniyan (yellow card) 25'; Jonathan Vila (yellow card) 33'; Panwar (yellow card) 71'; Díaz (yellow card) 75'	Stadium: Salt Lake Stadium; Attendance: 15,333; Referee: Raj Palmson Moses

24 November 2018 8	Mumbai City	0–0	ATK	Mumbai
19:30	Ali (yellow card) 63'; Fernandes (yellow card) 90+3'	Summary	Gerson (yellow card) 90+1'	Stadium: Mumbai Football Arena; Attendance: 4,623; Referee: (Singapore) Muhammad Taqi Aljaafari bin Jahari

28 November 2018 9	ATK	0–0	FC Goa	Kolkata
19:30	Bikey (yellow card) 32'; Halder (yellow card) 32'; Johnson (yellow card) 79'	Summary	Peña (yellow card) 32'; Edu Bedia (yellow card) 70'	Stadium: Salt Lake Stadium; Attendance: 21,870; Referee: Raul Gupta

=== Super Cup ===
As one of the top six teams in 2018–19 Indian Super League, ATK qualified for the main round in 2019 Indian Super Cup. ATK were scheduled to play the I-League side, Real Kashmir FC in Round of 16 match.

ATK defeated Real Kashmir Fc by 3–1 to reach quarter finals of Super cup. Now they will face Indian Super League team Delhi Dynamos in quarters.

1 April 2019 Round of 16	ATK	3–1	Real Kashmir	Bhubaneswar
20:30 IST				Stadium: Kalinga Stadium

5 April 2019 Quarter-final	Delhi Dynamos	3–4	ATK	Bhubaneswar
20:00 IST		Summary		Stadium: Kalinga Stadium

10 April 2019 Semi-final	ATK	0–2	Chennaiyin	Bhubaneswar
20:00 IST		Summary		Stadium: Kalinga Stadium

== Goalscorers ==
There have been 10 goals scored in 10 matches, for an average of 1 goal per match.

3 goals

- (Spain) Manuel Lanzarote

1 goal

- (Brazil) Gerson Vieira
- (England) John Johnson
- (India) Balwant Singh
- (India) Jayesh Rane
- (India) Komal Thatal
- (Morocco) Noussair El Maimouni
- (Nigeria) Kalu Uche

=== Goalscorers (Against) ===
There have been 10 goals scored in 10 matches, for an average of 1 goal per match.

1 goal

- (Australia) Eric Paartalu (Bengaluru FC)
- (India) Isaac Vanmalsawma (Chennaiyin FC)
- (India) Pritam Kotal (Delhi Dynamos FC)
- (India) Rowllin Borges (Northeast United FC)
- (India) Thoi Singh (Chennaiyin FC)
- (Palestine) Carlos Salom (Chennaiyin FC)
- (Serbia) Slaviša Stojanović (Kerala Blasters FC)
- (Slovenia) Matej Poplatnik (Kerala Blasters FC)
- (Spain) Sergio Cidoncha (Jamshedpur FC)
- (Venezuela) Miku (Bengaluru FC)

== Player information ==
=== Current squad ===
As of 16 November 2018

Note: Flags indicate national team as defined under FIFA eligibility rules; some limited exceptions apply. Players may hold more than one non-FIFA nationality.

No.	Pos.	Nation	Player
—	GK	IND	Debjit Majumder
—	GK	IND	Arindam Bhattacharya
—	GK	IND	Avilash Paul
—	DF	ENG	John Johnson
—	DF	BRA	Gerson Vieira
—	DF	IND	Arnab Mondal
—	DF	IND	Aiborlang Khongjee
—	DF	IND	Sena Ralte
—	DF	IND	Ricky Lallawmawma
—	DF	IND	Prabir Das
—	DF	IND	Ankit Mukherjee
—	MF	IND	Pronay Halder

No.	Pos.	Nation	Player
—	MF	IND	Eugeneson Lyngdoh
—	MF	IND	Malsawmzuala
—	MF	IND	Hitesh Sharma
—	MF	IND	Sheikh Faiaz
—	MF	IND	Komal Thatal
—	MF	IND	Cavin Lobo
—	MF	ESP	Manuel Lanzarote
—	DF	CMR	Andre Bikey
—	FW	IND	Jayesh Rane
—	FW	IND	Balwant Singh
—	FW	URU	Emiliano Alfaro
—	FW	BRA	Everton Santos

=== Management ===
As of 2 July 2018

Position	Name
Head coach	(England) Steve Coppell
Assistant coach	(England) Wally Downes
Head of Youth Development	(India) Sanjoy Sen
Goalkeeper coach	(England) Bobby Mimms
Physiotherapists	(India) Avinandan Chatterjee
Physiotherapists	(India) Noel Augustine
Physical trainer	(Brazil) Djair Miranda Garcia
Team manager	(India) Avishek Bhattacharjee
