= 2018–19 FC Goa season =

2018–19 season of FC Goa

Goa
2018–19 season
- President: Akshay Tandon
- Head Coach: Sergio Lobera
- Stadium: Fatorda Stadium
- Indian Super League: 2nd
- ISL playoffs: Runners-up
- Super Cup: Winners
- Top goalscorer: League: Coro (16 goals); All: Coro (21)
Home colours	Away colours

The 2018–19 season was the club's fifth season since its establishment in 2014 and their fourth season in the Indian Super League.

== Season overview ==
=== June ===
On 9 June 2018, midfielder Hugo Boumous extended his contract with the club. On 17 June, Goa announced the signing of Lenny Rodrigues from Bengaluru FC. On 29 June, Goa signed Jackichand Singh from Kerala Blasters FC.

=== July ===
On 8 July, Goa signed Lalthuammawia Ralte from Bengaluru FC. On 12 July, Goa signed full back Nirmal Chettri. On 20 July, Goa signed defender Mourtada Fall. On 25 July, midfielder Ahmed Jahouh extended his contract with the club.

=== August ===
On 5 August, Goa signed full back Carlos Peña. On 14 August, Goa signed winger Miguel Palanca from Anorthosis Famagusta FC. Goa traveled to Spain for their pre-season preparations. They played their first friendly match of the season in against Deportiva Minera.

=== September ===
They played five friendly matches in Spain, winning all the matches. They returned to Goa and played two friendlies against I-League clubs East Bengal and Indian Arrows and ended their pre-season preparations, they finished their pre-season without losing a single match.

=== October ===
On 1 October, Goa started their 2018–19 Indian Super League with a 2–2 away draw against NorthEast United. On 6 October, Goa won 1–3 away against Chennaiyin.

== Pre-season and friendlies ==
Win Draw Loss

On 22 August 2018, Goa began their pre-season tour in Spain. Goa played some friendly matches with their first match against Deportiva Minera, second match against FC Cartagena B, third match with Cartagena FC, fourth with Mar Menor FC and fifth with CD Algar. They returned to Goa and played their sixth friendly match against East Bengal and Indian Arrows.

30 August 2018 Friendly	Deportiva Minera (Spain)	0–3	(India) Goa	La Manga, Spain
00:00 IST (UTC+05:30)		Report	Mandar Rao Dessai 19'; Edu Bedia 34'; Liston Colaco 59'

4 September 2018 Friendly	Cartagena B (Spain)	0–20	(India) Goa	La Manga, Spain
23:00 IST (UTC+05:30)		Report	Ferran Corominas 5' 20' 22' 45' 58'; Hugo Boumous 10' 30'; Jackichand Singh 49' 52' 61'; Edu Bedia 76'; Liston Colaco 65' 82' 84'; Miguel Palanca Fernández 68' 72' 77'; Princeton Rebello 80'; Pratesh Shirodkar 86'

7 September 2018 Friendly	Cartagena FC (Spain)	2–3	(India) Goa	La Manga, Spain
00:00 IST (UTC+05:30)	Goal	Report	Jackichand Singh 17'; Ferran Corominas 41' 55'

10 September 2018 Friendly	Mar Menor (Spain)	1–2	(India) Goa	La Manga, Spain
00:00 IST (UTC+05:30)	Goal	Report	Miguel Palanca 15'; Hugo Boumous 30'

13 September 2018 Friendly	Algar (Spain)	1–2	(India) Goa	La Manga, Spain
00:00 IST (UTC+05:30)	Goal	Report	Ahmed Jahouh 19'; Hugo Boumous 41'

22 September 2018 Friendly	East Bengal (India)	0–1	(India) Goa	Bambolim, Goa
19:30 IST (UTC+05:30)		Report	Ferran Corominas 69'	Stadium: Athletic Stadium

25 September 2018 Friendly	Indian Arrows (India)	1–2	(India) Goa	Bambolim, Goa
19:30 IST (UTC+05:30)	Sanjeev Stalin 82'	Report	Miguel Palanca Fernández 60'; Princeton Rebello 88'	Stadium: Athletic Stadium

== Competitions ==
=== Indian Super League ===
==== Table ====
Pos	Team	Pld	W	D	L	GF	GA	GD	Pts	Qualification
1	Bengaluru (Note: Qualified for 2020 AFC Cup qualifying play-offs) (C)	18	10	4	4	29	22	+7	34 (Note: Head-to-head standings: Bengaluru 6 pts, Goa 0 pts.)	Advance to ISL Playoffs
2	Goa	18	10	4	4	36	20	+16	34	Advance to ISL Playoffs
3	Mumbai City	18	9	3	6	25	20	+5	30	Advance to ISL Playoffs
4	NorthEast United	18	7	8	3	22	18	+4	29	Advance to ISL Playoffs
5	Jamshedpur	18	6	9	3	29	21	+8	27	

Source: Indian Super League
Rules for classification: 1) points; 2) head-to-head points; 3) head-to-head goal difference; 4) head-to-head goals scored; 5) goal difference; 5) number of goals scored; 6) fair play ranking; 6) drawing of lots
(C) ISL Cup winners

==== Results summary ====
Overall								Home						Away					
Pld	W	D	L	GF	GA	GD	Pts	W	D	L	GF	GA	GD	W	D	L	GF	GA	GD
9	5	2	2	22	14	+8	17	3	0	1	13	6	+7	2	2	1	9	8	+1

==== Matches ====
===== Group stage =====
1 October 2018 1	NorthEast United FC (India)	2–2	(India) FC Goa	Guwahati, India
19:30 IST (UTC+5:30)	Federico Gallego 8'; Bartholomew Ogbeche 53'		Ferran Corominas 14' 38'	Stadium: Indira Gandhi Athletic Stadium; Attendance: 18,321

6 October 2018 2	Chennaiyin FC (India)	1–3	(India) FC Goa	Chennai, India
19:30 IST (UTC+5:30)	Eli Sabiá 90+5'		Edu Bedia 12'; Ferran Corominas 53'; Mourtada Fall 80'	Stadium: Jawaharlal Nehru Stadium; Attendance: 14,992

24 October 2018 3	FC Goa (India)	5–0	(India) Mumbai City FC	Goa, India
19:30 IST (UTC+5:30)	Ferran Corominas 7 (p)' Jackichand Singh 55'; Edu Bedia 61'; Miguel Palanca 84' 90'			Stadium: Fatorda Stadium; Attendance: 15,932

28 October 2018 4	FC Goa (India)	4–2	(India) FC Pune City	Goa, India
19:30 IST (UTC+5:30)	Ferran Corominas 5' 35'; Hugo Boumous 12'; Jackichand Singh 20'		Marcelo Pereira 8'; Emiliano Alfaro 23'	Stadium: Fatorda Stadium; Attendance: 16,705

1 November 2018 5	Jamshedpur FC (India)	4-1	(India) FC Goa	Jamshedpur, India
19:30 IST (UTC+5:30)	Michael Soosairaj 17' 50'; Memo 77'; Sumeet Passi 78'		Mourtada Fall 33'	Stadium: JRD Tata Sports Complex; Attendance: 22,751

8 November 2018 6	FC Goa (India)	3–2	(India) Delhi Dynamos FC	Goa, India
19:30 IST (UTC+5:30)	Edu Bedia 54' 89'; Brandon Fernandes 82'		Bikramjit Singh 6'; Lallianzuala Chhangte 70'	Stadium: Fatorda Stadium; Attendance: 17,495

11 November 2018 7	Kerala Blasters FC (India)	1-3	(India) FC Goa	Kochi, India
19:30 IST (UTC+5:30)	Nikola Krcmarevic 90'		Ferran Corominas 11' 45'; Manvir Singh 67'	Stadium: Jawaharlal Nehru Stadium; Attendance: 21,962

22 November 2018 8	FC Goa (India)	1-2	(India) Bengaluru FC	Goa, India
19:30 IST (UTC+5:30)	Brandon Fernandes 72'		Rahul Bheke 34'; Sunil Chhetri 77'	Stadium: Fatorda Stadium; Attendance: 17,807

28 November 2018 9	ATK (India)	0-0	(India) FC Goa	Kolkata, India
19:30 IST (UTC+5:30)				Stadium: Vivekananda Yuba Bharati Krirangan; Attendance: 21,870

11 December 2018 10	FC Pune City (India)	2-0	(India) FC Goa	Pune, India
19:30 IST (UTC+5:30)	Marcelo Pereira 74'; Marko Stankovic 90 (p)'			Stadium: Shree Shiv Chhatrapati Sports Complex; Attendance: 2,751

14 December 2018 11	FC Goa (India)	5-1	(India) Northeast United FC	Goa, India
19:30 IST (UTC+5:30)	Ferran Corominas 59' 84'; Edu Bedia 69'; Hugo Boumous 71'; Miguel Palanca 90'		Bartholomew Ogbeche 90'	Stadium: Fatorda Stadium; Attendance: 17,385

14 December 2018 12	FC Goa (India)	0-0	(India) Jamshedpur FC	Goa, India
19:30 IST (UTC+5:30)				Stadium: Fatorda Stadium; Attendance: 14,875

14 December 2018 13	Mumbai City FC (India)	0-2	(India) FC Goa	Mumbai, India
19:30 IST (UTC+5:30)			Edu Bedia 28'; Ferran Corominas 79(p)'	Stadium: Mumbai Football Arena; Attendance: 4,337

14 December 2018 14	Delhi Dynamos FC (India)	0-0	(India) FC Goa	New Delhi, India
19:30 IST (UTC+5:30)		Report		Stadium: Jawaharlal Nehru Stadium

14 December 2018 15	FC Goa (India)	3-0	(India) ATK	Goa, India
19:30 IST (UTC+5:30)		Report		Stadium: Fatorda Stadium; Attendance: 15,163

14 December 2018 16	FC Goa (India)	3-0	(India) Kerala Blasters FC	Goa, India
19:30 IST (UTC+5:30)		Report		Stadium: Fatorda Stadium; Attendance: 14,882

14 December 2018 17	Bengaluru FC (India)	3-0	(India) FC Goa	Bengaluru, India
19:30 IST (UTC+5:30)		Report		Stadium: Sree Kanteerava Stadium

14 December 2018 18	FC Goa (India)	1-0	(India) Chennaiyin FC	Goa, India
19:30 IST (UTC+5:30)		Report		Stadium: Fatorda Stadium

==== Goalscorers ====
There have been 22 goals scored in 9 matches, for an average of 2.44 goals per match.

8 goals

- (Spain) Ferran Corominas

4 goals

- (Spain) Edu Bedia

2 goals

- (India) Brandon Fernandes
- (India) Jackichand Singh
- (Senegal) Mourtada Fall
- (Spain) Miguel Palanca

1 goal

- (India) Manvir Singh
- (Morocco) Hugo Boumous

==== Goalscorers (Against) ====
There have been 14 goals scored in 9 matches, for an average of 1.56 goals per match.

2 goals

- (Brazil) Marcelo Pereira (FC Pune City)
- (India) Michael Soosairaj (Jamshedpur FC)

1 goal

- (Austria) Marco Stankovic (FC Pune City)
- (Brazil) Eli Sabia (Chennaiyin FC)
- (Brazil) Memo (Jamshedpur FC)
- (India) Bikramjit Singh (Delhi Dynamos FC)
- (India) Lallianzuala Chhangte (Delhi Dynamos FC)
- (India) Rahul Bheke (Bengaluru FC)
- (India) Sumeet Passi (Jamshedpur FC)
- (India) Sunil Chhetri (Bengaluru FC)
- (Nigeria) Bartholomew Ogbeche (Northeast United FC)
- (Serbia) Nikola Krčmarević (Kerala Blasters FC)
- (Uruguay) Emiliano Alfaro (FC Pune City)
- (Uruguay) Federico Gallego (Northeast United FC)

== Squad information ==
Note: Flags indicate national team as defined under FIFA eligibility rules; some limited exceptions apply. Players may hold more than one non-FIFA nationality.

No.	Pos.	Nation	Player
4	MF	MAR	Hugo Boumous
8	FW	ESP	Ferran Corominas
9	FW	IND	Manvir Singh
6	DF	IND	Chinglensana Singh
10	MF	IND	Brandon Fernandes
37	DF	IND	Mohamed Ali
23	MF	ESP	Edu Bedia
7	MF	IND	Mandar Rao Desai (captain)
—	MF	IND	Jackichand Singh
—	MF	IND	Lenny Rodrigues
—	DF	IND	Nirmal Chhetri
—	GK	IND	Lalthuammawia Ralte
27	GK	IND	Laxmikant Kattimani
1	GK	IND	Mohammad Nawaz

=== Current technical staff ===
As of June 2018, FC Goa's head coach is Sergio Lobera. He has signed a two-year contract and begins with the club in July 2017.

Position	Name
Head coach	(Spain) Sergio Lobera
Assistant coach	(Spain) Jesús Tato
Technical Director/Reserve team coach	(India) Derrick Pereira
Reserve team Assistant coach	(India) Clifford Miranda

== Transfers and loans ==
=== Transfers in ===
Date from	Position	Name	From
17 June 2018	MF	(India) Lenny Rodrigues	(India) Bengaluru FC
29 June 2018	MF	(India) Jackichand Singh	(India) Kerala Blasters FC
8 July 2018	GK	(India) Lalthuammawia Ralte	(India) Bengaluru FC
12 July 2018	DF	(India) Nirmal Chhetri	(India) NorthEast United FC
20 July 2018	DF	(Senegal) Mourtada Fall	(Morocco) Moghreb Tétouan
5 August 2018	DF	(Spain) Carlos Peña	(Spain) Lorca FC
14 August 2018	FW	(Spain) Miguel Palanca	(Cyprus) Anorthosis Famagusta FC

=== Transfers out ===
Position	Name	To
MF	(Spain) Manuel Lanzarote	(India) ATK
DF	(Spain) Sergio Juste	(Spain) CE L'Hospitalet
FW	(Netherlands) Mark Sifneos	(Greece) Panathinaikos F.C.
DF	(India) Narayan Das	(India) Delhi Dynamos
GK	(India) Naveen Kumar	(India) Kerala Blasters
DF	(India) Amey Ranawade	(India) Mohun Bhagan
MF	(India) Pronay Halder	(India) ATK
MF	(India) Mohammed Yasir	Free agent
MF	(India) Anthony D'Souza	Free agent
GK	(India) Bruno Colaço	Free agent
