= Mohammad Nawaz (footballer) =

Indian footballer

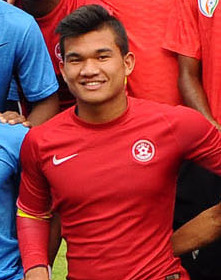
- Nawaz with India U17 in 2017

Personal information
- Date of birth: 21 January 2000 (age 26)
- Place of birth: Manipur, India
- Height: 1.74 m (5 ft 9 in)
- Position: Goalkeeper

Team information
- Current team: Chennaiyin
- Number: 1

Youth career
- 2016–2017: AIFF Elite Academy

Senior career*
Years	Team	Apps	(Gls)
2018	Goa B	8	(0)
2018–2021	Goa	43	(0)
2021–2024	Mumbai City	18	(0)
2024–	Chennaiyin	0	(0)

International career^{‡}
2016–2017	India U17	10	(0)
- * Club domestic league appearances and goals as of 21:42, 25 September 2023 (UTC) ‡ National team caps and goals as of 6 January 2020

Mohammad Nawaz (born 21 January 2000) is an Indian professional footballer who plays as a goalkeeper for Indian Super League club Chennaiyin.

== Club career ==
=== FC Goa B ===
Born in Manipur, Nawaz signed with FC Goa of the Indian Super League on 9 January 2018, after being a part of the India under-17 squad. He played for the club's reserve side in the I-League 2nd Division and Goa Professional League for the rest of the season. He made his debut for the reserves against Sporting Clube De Goa in a 2–1 loss on 25 January 2018 in a pro league game. 2 weeks later, he saved a penalty from Micky Vaz and registered his first win for the reserves in a 4–2 victory against FC Bardez. On 16 March, he made his I-League 2nd division debut against Madhya Bharat in a 5–1 win. 4 days later, he kept his first cleansheet in a goalless draw against Ozone FC. He finished his first professional season with 3 cleansheets in 14 games.

=== FC Goa ===
For the 2018–19 season, Nawaz was promoted to the club's first-team. Nawaz then made his professional debut for the club on 1 October 2018 against NorthEast United. During the match, he handled the ball outside the box which lead to the freekick which gave NorthEast United an early lead in the 8th minute before conceding again in the 53rd. The match ended in a 2–2 draw. Despite the mistake during the match, Goa head coach, Sergio Lobera, started Nawaz again in Goa's next match against the reigning champions Chennaiyin on 6 October 2018. The result this time was better for Goa as they won 3–1, with Nawaz earning the Emerging Player of the Match award. Having played an instrumental role in the FC Goa's successful campaigns in 2018-19 and 2019–20, winning the Super Cup and the League Winners' Shield, Nawaz became a pivotal member of the Gaurs' setup.

=== Mumbai City ===
In 2021, Indian Super League defending champions Mumbai City signed a three-year-long deal with Nawaz. He appeared in the 2021–22 season with the club as they finished on fifth position with Nawaz keeping five cleansheets. In April 2022, he was included in the club's 2022 AFC Champions League squad, and made his continental debut in their 1–0 defeat to Emirati side Al Jazira on 14 April. He made his Durand Cup debut against East Bengal on 3 September 2022 in a 4–3 loss and also received a yellow card. He remained on the bench in the final 2–1 loss to Bengaluru FC. He remained on the bench throughout the 2022–23 ISL season as backup for Phurba Lachenpa unable to make any appearance as Mumbai finished top of the table. In 2023 Indian Super Cup, he played only in the last group stage game against Chennaiyin FC as Lachenpa was out due to a minor injury, keeping a clean sheet in a 1–0 win.

== International career ==
Nawaz was part of the India under-17 side which was preparing for the FIFA U-17 World Cup being hosted in India. Prior to the tournament, it was announced that Nawaz wouldn't be in the 21-man squad but that he would be one of three players still training with the squad during it.

== Personal life ==
His father works as a driver, and his mother is an anganwadi worker. He is the cousin of Mohammad Yasir.

== Career statistics ==
=== Club ===
As of 14 February 2024

Club	Season	League			Super Cup		Durand Cup		AFC		Other		Total	
Club	Season	Division	Apps	Goals	Apps	Goals	Apps	Goals	Apps	Goals	Apps	Goals	Apps	Goals
Goa B	2017–18	I-League 2nd Division	8	0	—		—		—		6 (Note: Appearances in Goa Professional League)	0	14	0
Goa	2018–19	Indian Super League	13	0	4	0	—		—		—		17	0
Goa	2019–20	Indian Super League	20	0	—		—		—		—		20	0
Goa	2020–21	Indian Super League	10	0	—		—		—		—		10	0
Goa	Total		43	0	4	0	0	0	0	0	0	0	47	0
Mumbai City	2021–22	Indian Super League	17	0	—		—		1 (Note: Appearance(s) in AFC Champions League)	0	—		18	0
Mumbai City	2022–23	Indian Super League	0	0	1	0	2	0	—		—		3	0
Mumbai City	2023–24	Indian Super League	4	0	0	0	1	0	1	0	—		6	0
Mumbai City	Total		21	0	1	0	3	0	2	0	0	0	27	0
Career total			72	0	5	0	3	0	2	0	6	0	88	0

== Honours ==
FC Goa

- Indian Super Cup: 2019
- Indian Super League premiership: 2019–20
