= 2018–19 Indian Super League =

5th season of the Indian Super League

Indian Super League
- Season: 2018–19
- Dates: 29 September 2018 – 17 March 2019
- Champions: Bengaluru; 1st ISL title 3rd Indian title
- AFC Cup: Bengaluru
- Matches: 95
- Goals: 254 (2.67 per match)
- Top goalscorer: Coro (16 goals)
- Best goalkeeper: Gurpreet Singh Sandhu (96.32 mins per goal)
- Biggest home win: Goa 5–0 Mumbai City (24 October 2018); Mumbai City 6–1 Kerala Blasters (16 December 2018)
- Biggest away win: Mumbai City 1–5 Goa (9 March 2019)
- Highest scoring: Chennaiyin 3–4 NorthEast United (18 October 2018); Mumbai City 6–1 Kerala Blasters (16 December 2018)
- Longest winning run: Bengaluru (6 games)
- Longest unbeaten run: Bengaluru (11 games)
- Longest winless run: Kerala Blasters (14 games)
- Longest losing run: Chennaiyin (5 games)
- Highest attendance: 41,202; ATK 0–2 Kerala Blasters (29 September 2018)
- Lowest attendance: 3,134; Delhi Dynamos 2–0 Kerala Blasters (31 January 2019)
- Total attendance: 1,131,304
- Average attendance: 13,155

The 2018–19 Indian Super League season was the fifth season of the Indian Super League, one of the top Indian professional football leagues. It was established in 2013. The regular season began on 29 September 2018 and concluded on 17 March 2019. The league took a mid-season break for around one month from 17 December 2018 to early January 2019 due to India's participation in the 2019 AFC Asian Cup.

Chennaiyin were the defending champions, having defeated Bengaluru in the 2018 final, however they did not qualify for the playoffs having finished the last in the regular season. Bengaluru FC won their maiden title by defeating FC Goa 1–0 in the final which was held on 17 March 2019. Bengaluru FC became the first team who won the ISL trophy as well as after topped the league stage.

== Teams ==
Locations of the Indian Super League teams

=== Stadiums and locations ===
Team	City/State	Stadium	Capacity
ATK	Kolkata, West Bengal	Salt Lake Stadium	85,000
Bengaluru	Bengaluru, Karnataka	Sree Kanteerava Stadium	25,810
Chennaiyin	Chennai, Tamil Nadu	Jawaharlal Nehru Stadium	20,765
Delhi Dynamos	Delhi	Jawaharlal Nehru Stadium	14,342
Goa	Margao, Goa	Fatorda Stadium	18,600
Jamshedpur	Jamshedpur, Jharkhand	JRD Tata Sports Complex	24,424
Kerala Blasters	Kochi, Kerala	Jawaharlal Nehru Stadium	38,086
Mumbai City	Mumbai, Maharashtra	Mumbai Football Arena	7,790
NorthEast United	Guwahati, Assam	Indira Gandhi Athletic Stadium	23,627
Pune City	Pune, Maharashtra	Balewadi Stadium	10,237

=== Personnel and sponsorship ===
Team	Head coach	Captain	Kit manufacturer	Shirt sponsor
ATK	(England) Steve Coppell	(Spain) Manuel Lanzarote	Nivia	CESC Limited
Bengaluru	(Spain) Carles Cuadrat	(India) Sunil Chhetri	Puma	Kia Motors
Chennaiyin	(England) John Gregory	(Brazil) Maílson Alves	Performax	Apollo Tyres
Delhi Dynamos	(Spain) Josep Gombau	(Spain) Marcos Tébar	TYKA Sports	Aspire Academy
Goa	(Spain) Sergio Lobera	(India) Mandar Rao Dessai	Sqad Gear	Xiaomi
Jamshedpur	(Spain) César Ferrando	(Spain) Tiri	Nivia	Tata Steel
Kerala Blasters	(Portugal) Nelo Vingada	(India) Sandesh Jhingan	SIX5SIX	Muthoot Pappachan
Mumbai City	(Portugal) Jorge Costa	(Romania) Lucian Goian	Sqad Gear	ACE Group
NorthEast United	(Netherlands) Eelco Schattorie	(Nigeria) Bartholomew Ogbeche	Performax	McDowell's No. 1
Pune City	(England) Phil Brown	(England) Matt Mills	SIX5SIX	Suzuki Gixxer

=== Managerial changes ===
Team	Outgoing manager	Manner of departure	Date of vacancy	Position in table	Incoming manager	Date of appointment
Pune City	(Serbia) Ranko Popović	Contract finished	31 May 2018	Pre-season	(Brazil) Marcos Paquetá	1 June 2018
Bengaluru	(Spain) Albert Roca	Contract finished	31 May 2018	Pre-season	(Spain) Carles Cuadrat	14 June 2018
ATK	(Republic of Ireland) Robbie Keane	Contract finished	31 May 2018	Pre-season	(England) Steve Coppell	18 June 2018
Jamshedpur	(England) Steve Coppell	Contract finished	31 May 2018	Pre-season	(Spain) César Ferrando	21 July 2018
Delhi Dynamos	(Spain) Miguel Ángel Portugal	Mutual consent	2 May 2018	Pre-season	(Spain) Josep Gombau	2 August 2018
Pune City	(Brazil) Marcos Paquetá	Contract terminated	29 June 2018	Pre-season	(Spain) Miguel Ángel Portugal	9 August 2018
Mumbai City	(Costa Rica) Alexandre Guimarães	Mutual consent	14 August 2018	Pre-season	(Portugal) Jorge Costa	14 August 2018
NorthEast United	(Israel) Avram Grant	Contract finished	31 May 2018	Pre-season	(Netherlands) Eelco Schattorie	18 August 2018
Pune City	(Spain) Miguel Ángel Portugal	Sacked	26 October 2018	10th	(India) Pradhyum Reddy (Interim)	26 October 2018
Kerala Blasters	(England) David James	Sacked	18 December 2018	8th	(Portugal) Nelo Vingada	18 January 2019
Pune City	(India) Pradhyum Reddy (Interim)	Mutual consent	24 December 2018	7th	(England) Phil Brown	24 December 2018

== Foreign Players ==
The number of foreign players allowed in the squad will be reduced from eight to seven from 2018 to 2019 season, however the maximum number of foreign players allowed on the pitch will remain same at five.

Club	Foreigner 1	Foreigner 2	Foreigner 3	Foreigner 4	Foreigner 5	Foreigner 6	Foreigner 7
ATK	(Brazil) Éverton Santos	(Brazil) Gerson Vieira	(Cameroon) Andre Bikey	(England) John Johnson	(Nigeria) Kalu Uche	(Spain) Edu García	(Spain) Manuel Lanzarote
Bengaluru	(Spain) Álex Barrera	(Spain) Dimas Delgado	(Spain) Xisco Hernández	(Spain) Juanan	(Spain) Luisma	(Spain) Albert Serrán	(Venezuela) Miku
Chennaiyin	(Australia) Chris Herd	(Brazil) Maílson Alves	(Brazil) Raphael Augusto	(Brazil) Eli Sabiá	(Netherlands) Gregory Nelson	(Palestine) Carlos Salom	(Spain) Andrea Orlandi
Delhi Dynamos	(Mexico) Ulises Dávila	(Netherlands) Gianni Zuiverloon	(Slovenia) Rene Mihelič	(Spain) Adrià Carmona	(Spain) Martí Crespí	(Spain) Francisco Dorronsoro	(Spain) Marcos Tébar
Goa	(France) Hugo Boumous	(Morocco) Ahmed Jahouh	(Morocco) Zaid Krouch	(Senegal) Mourtada Fall	(Spain) Edu Bedia	(Spain) Coro	(Spain) Carlos Peña
Jamshedpur	(Australia) Tim Cahill	(Brazil) Memo	(Spain) Mario Arqués	(Spain) Carlos Calvo	(Spain) Sergio Cidoncha	(Spain) Pablo Morgado	(Spain) Tiri
Kerala Blasters	(France) Cyril Kali	(Ghana) Courage Pekuson	(Serbia) Nikola Krčmarević	(Serbia) Nemanja Lakić-Pešić	(Serbia) Slaviša Stojanović	(Slovenia) Matej Poplatnik	(Uganda) Kizito Keziron
Mumbai City	(Brazil) Rafael Bastos	(Democratic Republic of the Congo) Arnold Issoko	(Portugal) Paulo Machado	(Romania) Lucian Goian	(Senegal) Modou Sougou	(Serbia) Marko Klisura	(Uruguay) Matías Mirabaje
NorthEast United	(Colombia) José David Leudo	(Colombia) Janeiler Rivas Palacios	(Croatia) Mato Grgić	(Greece) Panagiotis Triadis	(Nigeria) Bartholomew Ogbeche	(Uruguay) Federico Gallego	(Uruguay) Juan Cruz Mascia
Pune City	(Austria) Marko Stanković	(Brazil) Diego Carlos	(Brazil) Marcelinho	(Canada) Iain Hume	(England) Matt Mills	(Spain) Jonathan Vila	(Uruguay) Martín Díaz

== Regular season ==
=== League table ===
Pos	Team	Pld	W	D	L	GF	GA	GD	Pts	Qualification
1	Bengaluru (Note: Qualified for 2020 AFC Cup qualifying play-offs) (C)	18	10	4	4	29	22	+7	34 (Note: Head-to-head standings: Bengaluru 6 pts, Goa 0 pts.)	Advance to ISL Playoffs
2	Goa	18	10	4	4	36	20	+16	34	Advance to ISL Playoffs
3	Mumbai City	18	9	3	6	25	20	+5	30	Advance to ISL Playoffs
4	NorthEast United	18	7	8	3	22	18	+4	29	Advance to ISL Playoffs
5	Jamshedpur	18	6	9	3	29	21	+8	27	
6	ATK	18	6	6	6	18	22	−4	24	
7	Pune City	18	6	4	8	24	30	−6	22	
8	Delhi Dynamos	18	4	6	8	23	27	−4	18	
9	Kerala Blasters	18	2	9	7	18	28	−10	15	
10	Chennaiyin	18	2	3	13	16	32	−16	9	

Source: Indian Super League
Rules for classification: 1) points; 2) head-to-head points; 3) head-to-head goal difference; 4) head-to-head goals scored; 5) goal difference; 5) number of goals scored; 6) fair play ranking; 6) drawing of lots
(C) Champions

=== Results ===
Home \ Away	KOL	BEN	CHE	DEL	GOA	JAM	KER	MUM	NEU	PUN
ATK	—	1–2	2–1	2–1	0–0	2–1	0–2	1–3	0–1	1–0
Bengaluru	1–0	—	1–0	1–0	3–0	2–2	2–2	1–1	2–1	2–1
Chennaiyin	2–3	2–1	—	1–3	1–3	0–0	0–0	0–1	3–4	1–2
Delhi Dynamos	1–2	3–2	0–0	—	0–0	2–2	2–0	2–4	0–2	1–1
Goa	3–0	1–2	1–0	3–2	—	0–0	3–0	5–0	5–1	4–2
Jamshedpur	1–1	5–1	3–1	2–1	4–1	—	2–2	1–0	0–0	1–4
Kerala Blasters	1–1	1–2	3–0	1–1	1–3	1–1	—	1–1	0–0	0–1
Mumbai City	0–0	1–0	2–0	2–0	0–2	0–2	6–1	—	0–2	2–0
NorthEast United	0–0	1–1	1–0	1–1	2–2	1–1	2–1	0–1	—	1–1
Pune City	2–2	0–3	2–4	1–3	2–0	2–1	1–1	2–1	0–2	—

Source: Indian Super League
Legend: Blue = home team win; Yellow = draw; Red = away team win.

== Playoffs ==
=== Bracket ===
Semi-finals
1	Bengaluru	1	3	4
4	NorthEast United	2	0	2
2	Goa	5	0	5
3	Mumbai City	1	1	2

Final
1	Bengaluru	1
2	Goa	0

=== Semi-finals ===
Team 1	Agg.	Team 2	1st leg	2nd leg
NorthEast United	2–4	Bengaluru	2–1	0–3
Mumbai City	2–5	Goa	1–5	1–0

=== Final ===
17 March 2019
17:30 IST

Bengaluru	1–0	Goa
Bheke 117'	Report

Mumbai Football Arena, Mumbai
Attendance: 7,372
Referee: Muhammad Taqi Aljaafari Bin Jahari (Singapore)

== Season statistics ==
=== Scoring ===
==== Top scorers ====
Rank	Player	Club	Goals
1	(Spain) Coro	Goa	16
2	(Senegal) Modou Sougou	Mumbai City	12
2	(Nigeria) Bartholomew Ogbeche	NorthEast United	12
4	(India) Sunil Chhetri	Bengaluru	9
5	(Spain) Edu Bedia	Goa	7
6	(Brazil) Marcelinho	Pune City	6
7	(Venezuela) Miku	Bengaluru	5
7	(Spain) Manuel Lanzarote	ATK	5
7	(India) Lallianzuala Chhangte	Delhi Dynamos	5
7	(India) Udanta Singh	Bengaluru	5
7	(Brazil) Rafael Bastos	Mumbai City	5

==== Top Indian scorers ====
Rank	Player	Club	Goals
1	Sunil Chhetri	Bengaluru	9
2	Lallianzuala Chhangte	Delhi Dynamos	5
2	Udanta Singh	Bengaluru	5
4	Daniel Lalhlimpuia	Delhi Dynamos	4
4	Michael Soosairaj	Jamshedpur	4
4	Thoi Singh	Chennaiyin	4
4	Robin Singh	Pune City	4
4	Rowllin Borges	NorthEast United	4
4	Jackichand Singh	Goa	4
10	C. K. Vineeth	Kerala Blasters	3
10	Brandon Fernandes	Goa	3
10	Rahul Bheke	Bengaluru	3

==== Hat-tricks ====
Result column shows goal tally of player's team first.

Player	For	Against	Result	Date	Ref
(Nigeria) Bartholomew Ogbeche	NorthEast United	Chennaiyin	3–4 (A)	18 October 2018	
(Senegal) Modou Sougou^{4}	Mumbai City	Kerala Blasters	6–1 (H)	16 December 2018	
(Senegal) Modou Sougou	Mumbai City	ATK	3–1 (A)	22 February 2019	

Notes

^{4} – Player scored four goals
(H) – Home team
(A) – Away team

=== Assists ===
Rank	Player	Club	Assists
1	(Democratic Republic of the Congo) Arnold Issoko	Mumbai City	8
2	(Spain) Coro	Goa	7
3	(Spain) Carlos Calvo	Jamshedpur	6
4	(Spain) Dimas Delgado	Bengaluru	5
4	(France) Hugo Boumous	Goa	5
4	(Uruguay) Federico Gallego	NorthEast United	5
4	(Spain) Edu Bedia	Goa	5
4	(Spain) Xisco Hernández	Bengaluru	5
8	(Venezuela) Miku	Bengaluru	4
8	(Brazil) Marcelinho	Pune City	4
8	(India) Brandon Fernandes	Goa	4
8	(India) Seiminlen Doungel	Kerala Balsters	4
8	(Portugal) Paulo Machado	Mumbai City	4
8	(India) Jackichand Singh	Goa	4

=== Clean sheets ===
Rank	Player	Club	Clean sheets
1	Amrinder Singh	Mumbai City	7
1	Gurpreet Singh Sandhu	Bengaluru	7
3	Pawan Kumar	NorthEast United	6
4	Naveen Kumar	Goa	4
4	Dheeraj Singh Moirangthem	Kerala Blasters	4
4	Mohammad Nawaz	Goa	4
4	Subrata Pal	Jamsedpur	4
4	Arindam Bhattacharya	ATK	4
4	Francisco Dorronsoro	Delhi Dynamos	4
10	Rehenesh TP	NorthEast United	2
10	Kamaljit Singh	Pune City	2
10	Karanjit Singh	Chennaiyin	2

=== Discipline ===
==== Player ====
- Most yellow cards: 8
  - Ahmed Jahouh (Goa)
- Most red cards: 2
  - Marcelinho (Pune City)

==== Club ====
- Most yellow cards: 50
  - Pune City
- Most red cards: 3
  - Pune City
  - NorthEast United
  - Goa
  - Bengaluru

== Average home attendances ==
Team	GP	Cumulative	High	Low	Mean
Jamshedpur	9	180,140	23,050	14,678	20,016
ATK	8	146,482	41,202	5,321	18,310
Kerala Blasters	8	136,996	31,166	3,298	17,125
Goa	10	163,779	17,807	14,482	16,378
Bengaluru	10	143,293	21,636	9,379	14,329
NorthEast United	9	121,122	21,786	6,873	13,458
Chennaiyin	7	85,270	14,992	6,939	12,181
Delhi Dynamos	9	63,861	12,342	3,134	7,096
Pune City	6	40,554	8,193	5,941	6,759
Mumbai City	10	49,807	7,563	3,462	4,981
Total	86	1,131,304	41,202	3,134	13,155

== Awards ==
- Source: Indian Super League website

=== Hero of the Match ===
Match	Hero of the Match		Match	Hero of the Match		Match	Hero of the Match	
Match	Player	Club	Match	Player	Club	Match	Player	Club
Match 1	Matej Poplatnik	Kerala Blasters	Match 33	Gerson Vieira	ATK	Match 65	Lallianzuala Chhangte	Delhi Dynamos
Match 2	Miku	Bengaluru	Match 34	Coro	Goa	Match 66	Coro	Goa
Match 3	Coro	Goa	Match 35	Ashique Kuruniyan	Pune City	Match 67	Marcelinho	Pune City
Match 4	Jerry Mawihmingthanga	Jamshedpur	Match 36	Sunil Chhetri	Bengaluru	Match 68	Manuel Lanzarote	ATK
Match 5	Rana Gharami	Delhi Dynamos	Match 37	Sandesh Jhingan	Kerala Blasters	Match 69	Brandon Fernandes	Goa
Match 6	John Johnson	ATK	Match 38	Subhasish Bose	Mumbai City	Match 70	Udanta Singh	Bengaluru
Match 7	Sandesh Jhingan	Kerala Blasters	Match 39	Pablo Morgado	Jamshedpur	Match 71	Panagiotis Triadis	NorthEast United
Match 8	Ahmed Jahouh	Goa	Match 40	Nishu Kumar	Bengaluru	Match 72	Memo	Jamshedpur
Match 9	Nishu Kumar	Bengaluru	Match 41	Federico Gallego	NorthEast United	Match 73	Raphael Augusto	Chennaiyin
Match 10	Balwant Singh	ATK	Match 42	Pronay Halder	ATK	Match 74	Edu Garcia	ATK
Match 11	Bartholomew Ogbeche	NorthEast United	Match 43	Dheeraj Singh Moirangthem	Kerala Blasters	Match 75	Rowllin Borges	NorthEast United
Match 12	Arnold Issoko	Mumbai City	Match 44	Rahul Bheke	Bengaluru	Match 76	Coro	Goa
Match 13	C.K. Vineeth	Kerala Blasters	Match 45	José David Leudo	NorthEast United	Match 77	Matej Poplatnik	Kerala Blasters
Match 14	Sergio Cidoncha	Jamshedpur	Match 46	Manuel Lanzarote	ATK	Match 78	Robin Singh	Pune City
Match 15	Sunil Chhetri	Bengaluru	Match 47	Paulo Machado	Mumbai City	Match 79	Daniel Lalhlimpuia	Delhi Dynamos
Match 16	Francisco Dorronsoro	Delhi Dynamos	Match 48	Seiminlen Doungel	Kerala Blasters	Match 80	Ahmed Jahouh	Goa
Match 17	Edu Bedia	Goa	Match 49	Chencho Gyeltshen	Bengaluru	Match 81	Rowllin Borges	NorthEast United
Match 18	Farukh Choudhary	Jamshedpur	Match 50	Modou Sougou	Mumbai City	Match 82	Miku	Bengaluru
Match 19	Manuel Lanzarote	ATK	Match 51	Jonathan Vila	Pune City	Match 83	Modou Sougou	Mumbai City
Match 20	Arnold Issoko	Mumbai City	Match 52	José David Leudo	NorthEast United	Match 84	Anirudh Thapa	Chennaiyin
Match 21	Ahmed Jahouh	Goa	Match 53	Arnold Issoko	Mumbai City	Match 85	Vinit Rai	Delhi Dynamos
Match 22	Seiminlen Doungel	Kerala Blasters	Match 54	Marcelinho	Pune City	Match 86	Michael Soosairaj	Jamshedpur
Match 23	Federico Gallego	NorthEast United	Match 55	Tiri	Jamshedpur	Match 87	Coro	Goa
Match 24	Erik Paartalu	Bengaluru	Match 56	Erik Paartalu	Bengaluru	Match 88	Lalthathanga Khawlhring	NorthEast United
Match 25	Michael Soosairaj	Jamshedpur	Match 57	Coro	Goa	Match 89	Iain Hume	Pune City
Match 26	Adil Khan	Pune City	Match 58	Nanda Kumar	Delhi Dynamos	Match 90	Edu Garcia	ATK
Match 27	Paulo Machado	Mumbai City	Match 59	Modou Sougou	Mumbai City	Match 91 (SF)	José David Leudo	NorthEast United
Match 28	Tiri	Jamshedpur	Match 60	Edu Garcia	ATK	Match 92 (SF)	Mourtada Fall	Goa
Match 29	Dimas	Bengaluru	Match 61	Bartholomew Ogbeche	NorthEast United	Match 93 (SF)	Miku	Bengaluru
Match 30	Maílson Alves	Chennaiyin	Match 62	Paulo Machado	Mumbai City	Match 94 (SF)	Mourtada Fall	Goa
Match 31	Ahmed Jahouh	Goa	Match 63	Subrata Paul	Jamshedpur	Match 95 (F)	Rahul Bheke	Bengaluru
Match 32	Arnold Issoko	Mumbai City	Match 64	Gurpreet Singh Sandhu	Bengaluru			

=== ISL Emerging Player of the Match ===
Match	Emerging Player of the Match		Match	Emerging Player of the Match		Match	Emerging Player of the Match	
Match	Player	Club	Match	Player	Club	Match	Player	Club
Match 1	Dheeraj Singh Moirangthem	Kerala Blasters	Match 33	Komal Thatal	ATK	Match 65	Nanda Kumar	Delhi Dynamos
Match 2	Jerry Lalrinzuala	Chennaiyin	Match 34	Mohammed Nawaz	Goa	Match 66	Mohammed Nawaz	Goa
Match 3	Nikhil Kadam	NorthEast United	Match 35	Jerry Mawihmingthanga	Jamshedpur	Match 67	Sarthak Golui	Pune City
Match 4	Jerry Mawihmingthanga	Jamshedpur	Match 36	Brandon Fernandes	Goa	Match 68	Hitesh Sharma	ATK
Match 5	Ashique Kuruniyan	Pune City	Match 37	Dheeraj Singh	Kerala Blasters	Match 69	Lallianzuala Chhangte	Delhi Dynamos
Match 6	Rehenesh TP	NorthEast United	Match 38	Komal Thatal	ATK	Match 70	Dheeraj Singh	Kerala Blasters
Match 7	Dheeraj Singh Moirangthem	Kerala Blasters	Match 39	Michael Soosairaj	Jamshedpur	Match 71	Nanda Kumar	Delhi Dynamos
Match 8	Mohammad Nawaz	Goa	Match 40	Lallianzuala Chhangte	Delhi Dynamos	Match 72	Farukh Choudhary	Jamshedpur
Match 9	Gourav Mukhi	Jamshedpur	Match 41	Ashique Kuruniyan	Pune City	Match 73	Laldinliana Renthlei	Chennaiyin
Match 10	Komal Thatal	ATK	Match 42	Mohammad Nawaz	Goa	Match 74	Sahil Panwar	Pune City
Match 11	Jerry Lalrinzuala	Chennaiyin	Match 43	Isaac Vanmalsawma	Chennaiyin	Match 75	Raynier Fernandes	Mumbai City
Match 12	Nikhil Poojari	Pune City	Match 44	Ashique Kuruniyan	Pune City	Match 76	Brandon Fernandes	Goa
Match 13	Lallianzuala Chhangte	Delhi Dynamos	Match 45	Redeem Tlang	NorthEast United	Match 77	Sahal Abdul Samad	Kerala Blasters
Match 14	Michael Soosairaj	Jamshedpur	Match 46	Hitesh Sharma	ATK	Match 78	Sahil Panwar	Pune City
Match 15	Sahil Panwar	Pune City	Match 47	Lallianzuala Chhangte	Delhi Dynamos	Match 79	Nanda Kumar	Delhi Dynamos
Match 16	Isaac Vanmalsawma	Chennaiyin	Match 48	Jerry Mawihmingthanga	Jamshedpur	Match 80	Mohammad Rakip	Kerala Blasters
Match 17	Chinglensana Singh	Goa	Match 49	Lalthathanga Khawlhring	NorthEast United	Match 81	Ashique Kuruniyan	Pune City
Match 18	Michael Soosairaj	Jamshedpur	Match 50	Raynier Fernandes	Mumbai City	Match 82	Brandon Fernandes	Goa
Match 19	Jerry Lalrinzuala	Chennaiyin	Match 51	Sarthak Golui	Pune City	Match 83	Pranjal Bhumij	Mumbai City
Match 20	Ravi Kumar	Mumbai City	Match 52	Redeem Tlang	NorthEast United	Match 84	Isaac Vanmalsawma	Chennaiyin
Match 21	Mohammad Nawaz	Goa	Match 53	Subhasish Bose	Mumbai City	Match 85	Rohit Kumar	Pune City
Match 22	Michael Soosairaj	Jamshedpur	Match 54	Kamaljit Singh	Pune City	Match 86	Jerry Mawihmingthanga	Jamshedpur
Match 23	Redeem Tlang	NorthEast United	Match 55	Farukh Choudhary	Jamshedpur	Match 87	Saviour Gama	Goa
Match 24	Komal Thatal	ATK	Match 56	Ankit Mukherjee	ATK	Match 88	Sahal Abdul Samad	Kerala Blasters
Match 25	Sumeet Passi	Jamshedpur	Match 57	Seriton Fernandes	Goa	Match 89	Mohammad Yasir	Pune City
Match 26	Kamaljit Singh	Pune City	Match 58	Isaac Vanmalsawma	Chennaiyin	Match 90	Ankit Mukherjee	ATK
Match 27	Anirudh Thapa	Chennaiyin	Match 59	Raynier Fernandes	Mumbai City	Match 91 (SF)	Redeem Tlang	NorthEast United
Match 28	Mohammad Sajid Dhot	Delhi Dynamos	Match 60	Sahal Abdul Samad	Kerala Blasters	Match 92 (SF)	Brandon Fernandes	Goa
Match 29	Lalruatthara	Kerala Blasters	Match 61	Lalthathanga Khawlhring	NorthEast United	Match 93 (SF)	Nishu Kumar	Bengaluru
Match 30	Ashique Kuruniyan	Pune City	Match 62	Raynier Fernandes	Mumbai City	Match 94 (SF)	Brandon Fernandes	Goa
Match 31	Lallianzuala Chhangte	Delhi Dynamos	Match 63	Michael Soosairaj	Jamshedpur	Match 95 (F)	Nishu Kumar	Bengaluru
Match 32	Redeem Tlang	NorthEast United	Match 64	Lalthathanga Khawlhring	NorthEast United			

=== End-of-season awards ===
Award	Player	Club
Golden Ball For The Hero of the League	(Spain) Coro	Goa
ISL Emerging Player of the Season	(India) Sahal Abdul Samad	Kerala Blasters
Golden Glove	(India) Gurpreet Singh Sandhu	Bengaluru
Winning Pass Season Award For Most Assists	(Democratic Republic of the Congo) Arnold Issoko	Mumbai City
Golden Boot	(Spain) Coro	Goa
Best Pitch of the Season	Kerala Blasters for Jawaharlal Nehru Stadium (Kochi)	

ISL Team of the Season (2018–19)
Goalkeeper	(India) Amrinder Singh (Mumbai City)			
Defenders	(India) Rahul Bheke (Bengaluru FC)		(Senegal) Mourtada Fall (FC Goa)	(Spain) Tiri (Jamshedpur FC)
Midfielders	(Morocco) Ahmed Jahouh (FC Goa)	(India) Rowllin Borges (NorthEast United)	(India) Lallianzuala Chhangte (Delhi Dynamos)	(Uruguay) Federico Gallego (NorthEast United)
Forwards	(India) Sahal Abdul Samad (Kerala Blasters)	(Spain) Ferran Corominas (FC Goa)		(Senegal) Modou Sougou (Mumbai City)

== See also ==
- 2018–19 I-League
