= 2019 Indian Super League playoffs =

Tournament details
- Country: India
- Teams: 4

Final positions
- Champions: Bengaluru
- Runners-up: Goa
- Semifinalists: NorthEast United; Mumbai City

The 2019 Indian Super League playoffs was fifth playoffs series in the Indian Super League, one of the top Indian professional football leagues. The playoffs began in March 2019 and concluded with the final in March 2019 in Mumbai.

The top four teams from the 2018–19 ISL regular season had qualified for the playoffs. The semi-finals took place over two legs while the final was a one-off match at the Mumbai Football Arena.

The defending champions from last season, Chennaiyin, failed to qualify for the playoffs this season and thus were not able to defend their title. This was also NorthEast United's first playoff appearance.

== Season table ==
| Pos | Team | Pld | W | D | L | GF | GA | GD | Pts | Qualification |
|---|---|---|---|---|---|---|---|---|---|---|
| 1 | Bengaluru (Note: Qualified for 2020 AFC Cup qualifying play-offs) (C) | 18 | 10 | 4 | 4 | 29 | 22 | +7 | 34 (Note: Head-to-head standings: Bengaluru 6 pts, Goa 0 pts.) | Advance to ISL Playoffs |
| 2 | Goa | 18 | 10 | 4 | 4 | 36 | 20 | +16 | 34 | Advance to ISL Playoffs |
| 3 | Mumbai City | 18 | 9 | 3 | 6 | 25 | 20 | +5 | 30 | Advance to ISL Playoffs |
| 4 | NorthEast United | 18 | 7 | 8 | 3 | 22 | 18 | +4 | 29 | Advance to ISL Playoffs |
| 5 | Jamshedpur | 18 | 6 | 9 | 3 | 29 | 21 | +8 | 27 | |
| 6 | ATK | 18 | 6 | 6 | 6 | 18 | 22 | −4 | 24 | |
| 7 | Pune City | 18 | 6 | 4 | 8 | 24 | 30 | −6 | 22 | |
| 8 | Delhi Dynamos | 18 | 4 | 6 | 8 | 23 | 27 | −4 | 18 | |
| 9 | Kerala Blasters | 18 | 2 | 9 | 7 | 18 | 28 | −10 | 15 | |
| 10 | Chennaiyin | 18 | 2 | 3 | 13 | 16 | 32 | −16 | 9 | |

Source: Indian Super League
Rules for classification: 1) points; 2) head-to-head points; 3) head-to-head goal difference; 4) head-to-head goals scored; 5) goal difference; 5) number of goals scored; 6) fair play ranking; 6) drawing of lots
(C) Champions

== Teams ==
- Bengaluru FC
- FC Goa
- NorthEast United FC
- Mumbai City FC

== Bracket ==
Semi-finals
1 | Bengaluru | 1 | 3 | 4
4 | NorthEast United | 2 | 0 | 2
2 | Goa | 5 | 0 | 5
3 | Mumbai City | 1 | 1 | 2

Final
1 | Bengaluru | 1
2 | Goa | 0

== Semi-finals ==
| Team 1 | Agg. | Team 2 | 1st leg | 2nd leg |
|---|---|---|---|---|
| NorthEast United | 2–4 | Bengaluru | 2–1 | 0–3 |
| Mumbai City | 2–5 | Goa | 1–5 | 1–0 |

=== Leg 1 ===
7 March 2019
19:30 IST

| NorthEast United | 2–1 | Bengaluru |
|---|---|---|
| Tlang 20'; Mascia 90+5' (pen.) | Report | Xisco 82' |

Indira Gandhi Athletic Stadium, Guwahati
Attendance: 21,786
Referee: Santosh Kumar

9 March 2019
19:30 IST

| Mumbai City | 1–5 | Goa |
|---|---|---|
| Bastos 20' | Report | J. Singh 31'; Fall 39', 58'; Coro 51'; Fernandes 82' |

Mumbai Football Arena, Mumbai
Attendance: 7,126
Referee: Hamad Ali Yousef Abdulla Alali (United Arab Emirates)

=== Leg 2 ===
11 March 2019
19:30 IST

| Bengaluru | 3–0 | NorthEast United |
|---|---|---|
| Miku 72'; Dimas 87'; Chhetri 90+2' | Report |

Sree Kanteerava Stadium, Bengaluru
Attendance: 21,636
Referee: Hamad Ali Yousef Abdulla Alali (United Arab Emirates)

Bengaluru won 4–2 on aggregate

12 March 2019
19:30 IST

| Goa | 0–1 | Mumbai City |
|---|---|---|
| | Report | Bastos 6' |

Fatorda Stadium, Margao
Attendance: 17,807
Referee: Venkatesh Ramachandran

Goa won 5–2 on aggregate

== Final ==
17 March 2019
17:30 IST

| Bengaluru | 1–0 | Goa |
|---|---|---|
| Bheke 117' | Report |

Mumbai Football Arena, Mumbai
Attendance: 7,372
Referee: Muhammad Taqi Aljaafari Bin Jahari (Singapore)
