= Brandon Fernandes =

Indian association football player (born 1994)

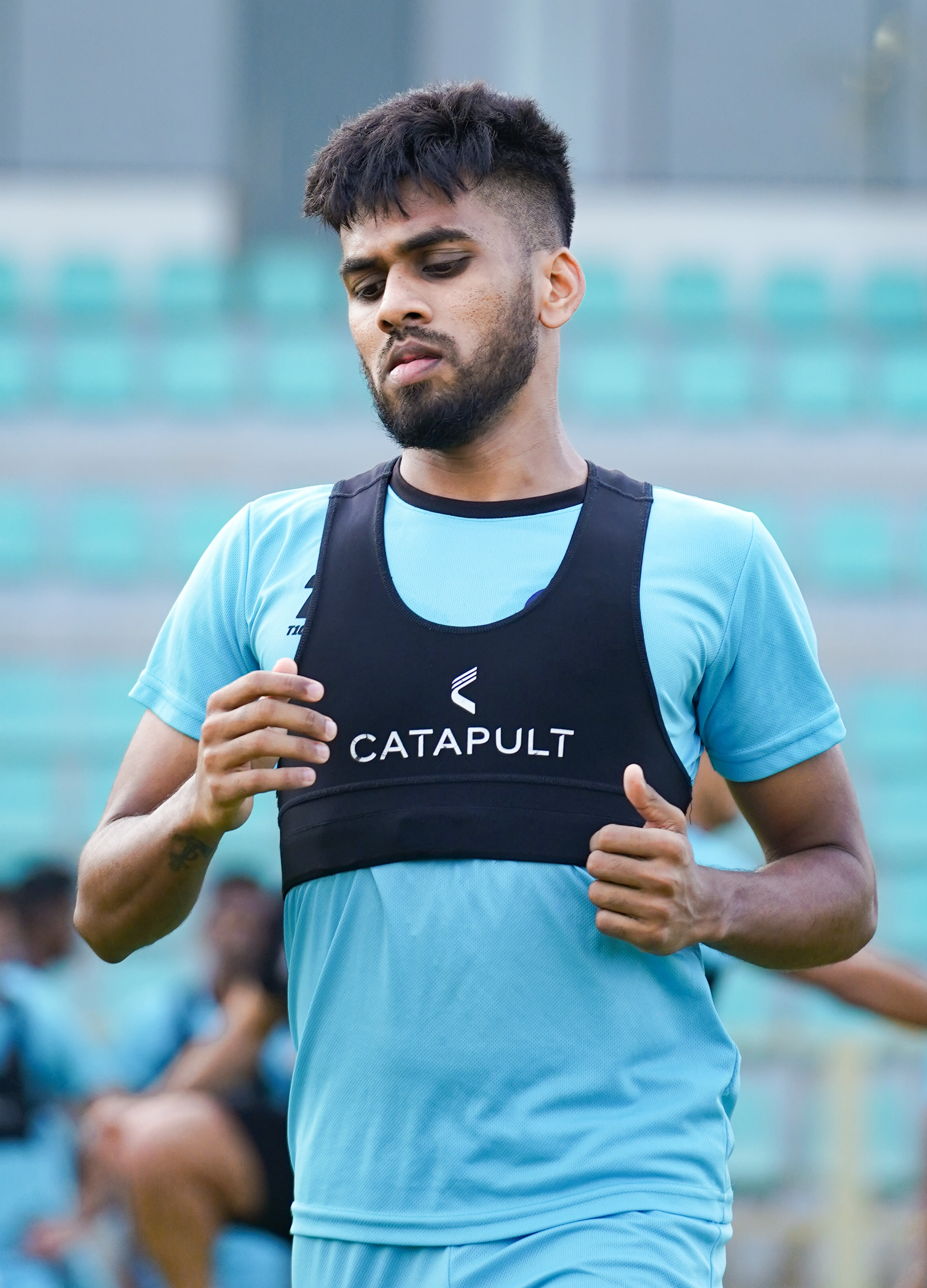
- Fernandes training with Goa in 2019

Personal information
- Full name: Brandon Fernandes
- Date of birth: 20 September 1994 (age 32)
- Place of birth: Margao, Goa, India
- Height: 1.67 m (5 ft 6 in)
- Position: Attacking midfielder

Team information
- Current team: Mumbai City
- Number: 10

Youth career
- 2002–2007: Fransa-Pax
- Velsao Pale Sports Club
- Goa United Football Association
- Salgaocar
- 2010–2013: ASD Cape Town Academy

Senior career*
Years	Team	Apps	(Gls)
2014-2015	Sporting Goa	9	(3)
2015–2017	Mumbai City	2	(0)
2016	→ Mohun Bagan (loan)	4	(1)
2017	Churchill Brothers	15	(3)
2017–2024	Goa	109	(11)
2024–	Mumbai City	32	(2)

International career^{‡}
2011–2014	India U20	7	(3)
2019–	India	33	(0)
Medal record
Men's football
Representing India
SAFF Championship
Winner	2021 Maldives
- * Club domestic league appearances and goals as of 16:50, 6 May 2026 (UTC) ‡ National team caps and goals as of 22:00, 14 October 2025 (UTC)

Brandon Fernandes (born 20 September 1994) is an Indian professional footballer who plays as an attacking midfielder for Indian Super League club Mumbai City and the India national team.

== Club career ==
=== Early career ===
Born in Margao, Goa, Fernandes started playing competitive football at age six when his parents got him into the youth set-up at Fransa-Pax. After Fransa-Pax disbanded, he moved to the youth set-up at Velsao Pale Sports Club where he played for the club's under-14 side as an eight year old. After spending time with Velsao Pale, Fernandes moved to the Goa United Football Academy before being signed by Salgaocar to join their under-14 side. During his time at Salgaocar, he represented the team at the under-14, under-16, and under-19 levels.

After impressive performances for both Salgaocar and the India under-20 side, Brandon was enrolled into the ASD Football Academy in Cape Town, South Africa. While with ASD, Fernandes attracted many scouts from around Europe resulting in trials from three English clubs, Leicester City, Reading, and Sunderland, but could not earn a contract at any of those clubs. Fernandes also played for the ASD Cape Town team in the SAFA Second Division, the third-tier of South African football, where he managed to score 12 goals from 12 matches, 4 of which were free-kicks.

Before playing in the Lusophony Games in 2014, Fernandes was supposed to go on trial with AS Monaco but the trials never materialized. After impressing for Goa during the 2014 Lusophony Games, he rejected offers from seven different I-League clubs, stating that he would like to wait for an offer from a European club.

=== Sporting Goa ===
A year after his contract with ASD Cape Town expired, and after saying in the past that he would not play in the I-League, Fernandes returned to India to sign for Sporting Goa. He made his professional debut for the club on 8 February 2015 against Mumbai at the Cooperage Ground, starting the match and playing 23 minutes before being substituted off due to an injury as Sporting Goa drew the match 0–0. he returned from injury to make his second appearance for Sporting Goa against Royal Wahingdoh, coming on as a 68th-minute substitute for Anthony Wolfe, and was booked as Sporting drew 0–0. Brandon scored his first senior professional goal against Salgaocar on 19 April 2015 in a 2–0 win for Sporting Goa

Fernandes then put in a man of the match performance over Bharat on 2 May 2015. Pressuring the Bharat defense throughout his 88 minutes on the pitch, he scored from a free-kick in the 42nd minute to help Sporting Goa win 2–0, their second victory of the season entering the final month of the campaign. After the match, Fernandes was praised by Sporting Goa head coach, Mateus Costa, when he said that "Since Brandon joined our squad, things have really changed. He is very good on the wing and we were lacking that kind of a player. He is also a free-kick specialist and the goal that he scored today was beautiful".

Fernandes then scored another well struck goal on 20 May 2015 against Shillong Lajong. Pouncing on a mistake by Shillong Lajong goalkeeper, Rehenesh TP, in which the keeper miss kicked his clearance, Brandon slotted the ball into the net from more than 30 yards out. Sporting Goa went on to win 2–1. He assisted Sandesh Jhingan in the final round of the season, from a corner, in an eventual 4–0 win for his team, thus helping confirming the status of his team in the top flight for the next I-League season.

=== Mumbai City ===
Brandon was picked up in the 2015 Indian Super League draft by Mumbai City during the first round for Rs. 12 lakhs. Having missed the first 7 rounds of the 2015 Indian Super League through injury, Brandon made his debut against Delhi Dynamos in round 8, coming on as a substitute in a 1–1 draw for his team. On his first start for Mumbai City, which was his second appearance of the season, Brandon was injured and ruled out of the season.

==== Mohun Bagan (loan) ====
On 6 January 2016 it was announced that Brandon has signed for reigning I-League champions Mohun Bagan on loan from Mumbai City. He made his debut for Mohun Bagan on 30 January 2016 against DSK Shivajians. He played 60 minutes as Mohun Bagan won the match 2–0. He scored his first goal for the club a month later on 1 March against Sporting Goa. His strike came in the 28th minute but Fernandes had to be taken off the pitch four minutes later due to a knee injury. It was later revealed that Fernandes would most likely require surgery on his knee.

=== Churchill Brothers ===
Brandon signed for the newly re-instated I-League club Churchill Brothers for the 2016–17 I-League season. After missing out on large portions of the previous two years through injury, Brandon would have a very active season as he appeared 15 times in the league for Churchill where he would score 3 goals and would finish as the highest provider of assists with 7 assists. The high point of his season would be the game against Chennai City where he would assist 4 times and score once in a 6–1 win for his team. He would also play in the Federation Cup but could not help his team qualify for the semi-finals.

=== Goa ===
Fernandes was drafted in by Goa for the 2017–18 Indian Super League at a cost of ₹2,750,000. He would play 15 times for his club and provide 4 assists during the season in the league, and score twice in the Super Cup as Goa was eliminated by East Bengal in the cup competition. On 24 January 2018, he signed a new contract with FC Goa, keeping him at the club until 2020.

During the 2018–19 season, Brandon was an integral part of the Sergio Lobera's system, playing primarily on the left side of midfield as his team finished second the league on head-to-head ruling. Goa would be defeated in the play-off final by Bengaluru as he ended the season with 3 goals and 4 assists. He was also part of Goa's 2019 Super Cup winning team, where he scored thrice in the competition, including the final.

Fernandes continued with Goa for the 2019–20 season, primarily on the left side of midfield as Hugo Boumous moved to the attacking midfielder role to play behind Coro. He scored twice and assist 7 times in 17 appearances in the season, finishing as the highest assisting Indian player in the league once again.

==== 2020–2021 ====
On 10 April 2021, Fernandes signed a new three-year contract with Goa, keeping him at the club until 2024. On 20 April 2021, Fernandes assisted Edu Bedia to score the first ever goal by an Indian club in the AFC Champions League's group stage, despite his team losing the game against Persepolis. On 26 April 2021, Fernandes again assisted Ortiz for a 1–1 draw in their last AFC Champions League game against Qatari club Al Rayyan.

=== Return to Mumbai City ===
On 1 June 2024, Fernandes joined Mumbai City on a three-year contract, with an option to extend by a further season. He made his second debut for the club in their first league match of the season, away against Mohun Bagan SG as an 85th-minute substitute for Jeremy Manzorro, as Mumbai went on to fight back from 2–0 down to draw the game 2-2.

== International career ==
While playing for Velsao Pale, Fernandes was selected to join the India U14 side during the AFC U-14 Football Festival in 2007. He then went on to captain the India U17 which won the Coca-Cola Celebration Cup in 2010. Fernandes also scored in his first ever match for the India U20 team on 31 October 2011 against Turkmenistan during the 2012 AFC U-19 Championship qualifiers. Brandon is widely regarded as the best midfielders in India. He has played for India at all levels except the senior team. Many fans criticised the decision of the coach to snub the likes of Brandon Fernandez, Rahul Bheke, Sosairaj, Mandar, Adil who have been performing well for the last 2–3 seasons for the AFC Asian Cup 2019.

In 2014, Fernandes represented his home state, Goa, during the 2014 Lusophony Games. He played in the final of the tournament, assisting twice and scoring once from the penalty spot, as Goa beat the under-20 team of Mozambique to become the champions at the Lusophony Games. Brandon played 4 times, and scored thrice during the Lusophony games.

== Personal life ==
Fernandes was born on 20 September 1994 in Margao, Goa, to Konkani actor and singer Jaju Fernandes. His paternal uncle, Roseferns, is also involved in the Konkani stage as a theatre director and actor. Fernandes married Kim Alemao, in April 2022.

== Career statistics ==
=== Club ===
As of 26 February 2023

Club	Season	League			Cup		AFC		Others		Total	
Club	Season	Division	Apps	Goals	Apps	Goals	Apps	Goals	Apps	Goals	Apps	Goals
Sporting Goa	2014–15	I-League	9	3	0	0	—				9	3
Mumbai City	2015	Indian Super League	2	0	0	0	—				2	0
Mohun Bagan (loan)	2015–16	I-League	4	1	0	0	—				4	1
Churchill Brothers	2016–17	I-League	15	3	3 (Note: Appearance(s) in Federation Cup)	1	—				18	4
Goa	2017–18	Indian Super League	15	0	2 (Note: Appearance(s) in Super Cup)	2	—				17	2
Goa	2018–19	Indian Super League	18	3	4	3	—				22	6
Goa	2019–20	Indian Super League	17	2	0	0	—				17	2
Goa	2020–21	Indian Super League	12	0	0	0	6 (Note: Appearance(s) in AFC Champions League)	0			18	0
Goa	2021–22	Indian Super League	7	0	—		—		4 (Note: Appearance(s) in Durand Cup)	1	11	1
Goa	2022–23	Indian Super League	20	3	1	0	—				21	3
Goa	2023–24	Indian Super League	20	3	0	0	—		4	0	24	3
Goa	Goa total		109	11	7	5	6	0	8	1	130	17
Mumbai City	2024–25	Indian Super League	0	0	0	0	0	0	0	0	0	0
Career total			139	18	10	6	6	0	8	1	163	25

=== International ===
As of 14 October 2025

National team	Year	Apps	Goals
India	2019	7	0
India	2021	6	0
India	2022	6	0
India	2023	3	0
India	2024	7	0
India	2025	4	0
Total		33	0

== Honours ==
FC Goa

- Super Cup: 2019
- Indian Super League Premiers: 2019–20
- Durand Cup: 2021

India

- SAFF Championship: 2021
- King's Cup third place: 2019
- Tri-Nation Series: 2023

India U20 (Goa India)

- Lusofonia Games: 2014
