= Modou Sougou =

Senegalese footballer

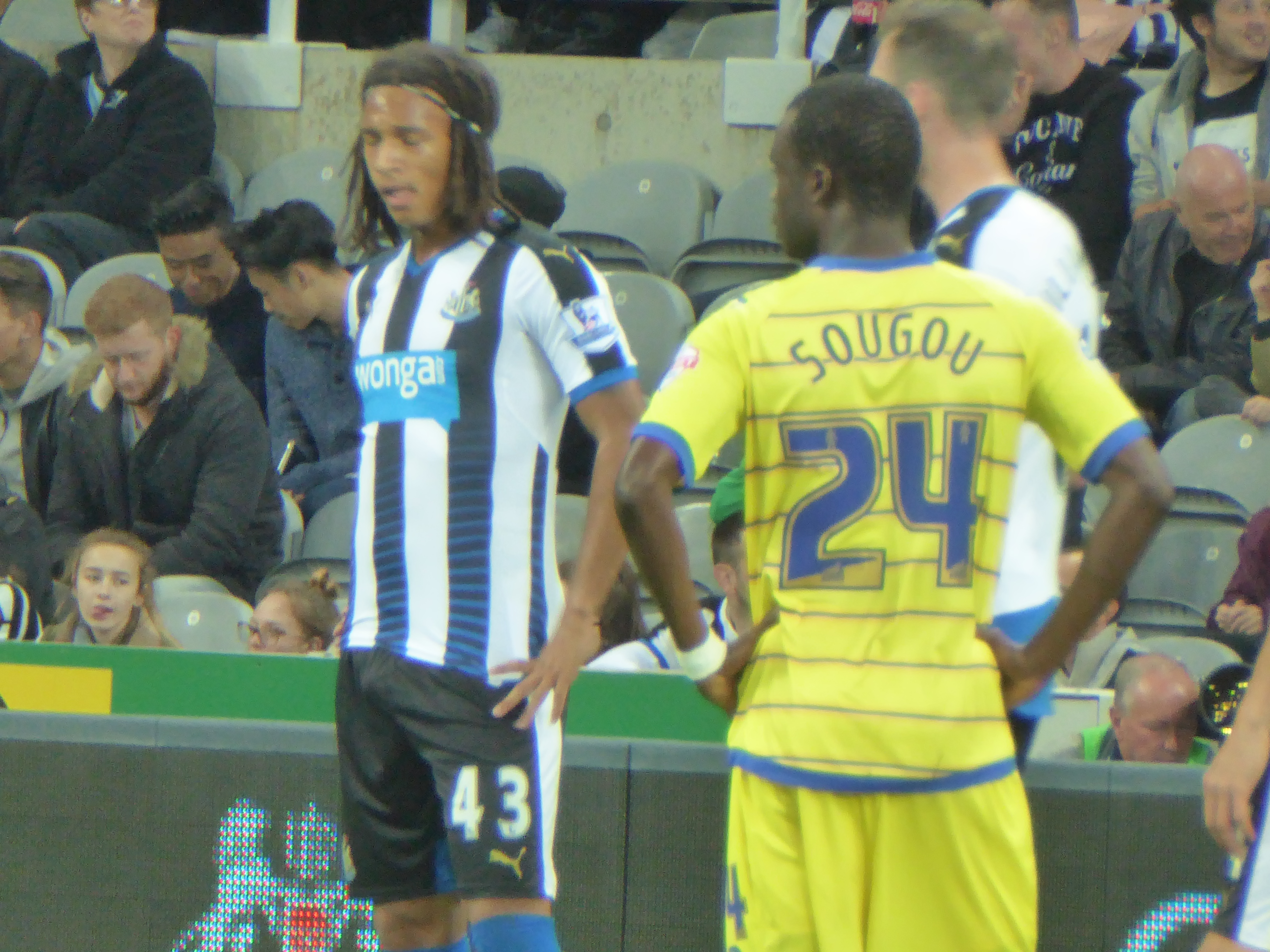
- Sougou with Sheffield Wednesday in 2015

Personal information
- Full name: Pape Amodou Sougou
- Date of birth: 18 December 1984 (age 41)
- Place of birth: Fissel, Senegal
- Height: 1.78 m (5 ft 10 in)
- Position: Winger

Youth career
- 2002–2004: Douanes

Senior career*
Years	Team	Apps	(Gls)
2004–2005	União Leiria	7	(0)
2005–2006	Vitória Setúbal	27	(1)
2006–2008	União Leiria	38	(5)
2008–2011	Académica	80	(19)
2011–2013	CFR Cluj	44	(11)
2013–2015	Marseille	14	(0)
2013–2015	→ Évian (loan)	53	(6)
2015–2017	Sheffield Wednesday	9	(2)
2017	→ Moreirense (loan)	13	(2)
2018–2020	Mumbai City	32	(15)
Total		317	(61)

International career
2007–2013	Senegal	12	(1)
- * Club domestic league appearances and goals

Pape Amodou "Modou" Sougou (born 18 December 1984) is a Senegalese former professional footballer who played as a right winger.

== Club career ==
=== Early years and Portugal ===
Born in the village of Fissel in the M'bour department, Sougou started his career with Dakar-based AS Douanes. He moved to Portugal in 2004 at the age of 19, signing a four-year contract with U.D. Leiria. He made his Primeira Liga debut on 29 November, coming on as a late substitute in a 1–0 home win against S.L. Benfica.

Sougou continued to compete in the Portuguese top flight the following six seasons, representing Vitória de Setúbal, Leiria and Académica de Coimbra. In 2009–10, whilst at the service of the latter club, he scored a career-best in the country nine goals in 29 matches, helping it to the 11th position; additionally, in early 2013, he revealed that he came close to signing with FC Porto when André Villas-Boas was the manager, but a potential deal fell through due to injury.

=== CFR Cluj ===
In late May 2011, Sougou joined Liga I side CFR Cluj, having previously signed a pre-contract agreement. The move was put on hold because his previous club, Académica, wanted €300,000 in compensation, but the transfer was eventually completed whilst the player stated one of the main reasons to sign was rejoining former manager Jorge Costa.

Sougou finished his first year in Romania as joint-ninth top scorer with ten goals, adding several assists to help his team win the national championship for the third time in five years. In January 2012, chairman Julius Muresan revealed that the player had been given a release clause of €11 million.

On 20 November 2012, Sougou provided two passes for two goals of teammate Rui Pedro's hat-trick in a 3–1 away victory over S.C. Braga in the group stage of UEFA Champions League; he himself scored twice in two 2–1 wins in the qualifying rounds, at FC Slovan Liberec and FC Basel. Later that year, he was named by Gazeta Sporturilor as the second best foreign player in the country behind Wesley.

=== Marseille ===
On 24 January 2013, Sougou agreed to a three-year deal with Olympique de Marseille for €4.5 million and a €600,000 annual salary. Upon his arrival, manager Élie Baup stated: "We saw that we were missing an accelerator against Montpellier [...]. Sougou has all of these qualities."

Sougou scored his first goal on 30 January 2013, in a 2–1 away defeat of FC Rouen in the round of 32 of the Coupe de France. His first appearance in Ligue 1 took place on 3 February, when he featured 13 minutes of the 0–1 home loss to AS Nancy Lorraine.

Subsequently, Sougou served two consecutive loan spells at fellow league club Thonon Évian FC. He was fairly played during his two-year tenure, scoring seven times in all competitions and helping his team avoid relegation.

After returning to l'OM, Sougou was left out of the pre-season tour by coach Marcelo Bielsa. He left by mutual consent on 4 August 2015.

=== Sheffield Wednesday ===
On 5 August 2015, Sougou signed for Championship side Sheffield Wednesday on a two-year contract. He scored on his debut for his new team six days later, in a 4–1 win against Mansfield Town in the League Cup at the Hillsborough Stadium.

On 31 January 2017, Sougou returned to Portugal and its top division when he joined Moreirense F.C. until the end of the season.

=== Mumbai City ===
Sougou joined Mumbai City FC of the Indian Super League on 3 September 2018, ahead of the upcoming campaign. He scored a career-best 12 goals in his first year, helping his team to the third position and only trailing FC Goa's Coro in the individual chart.

== International career ==
Sougou made his debut for Senegal on 21 August 2007, playing the first half of a 1–1 friendly draw against Ghana in London. He was selected for the 2008 Africa Cup of Nations tournament, appearing in two games an eventual group-stage exit.

== Personal life ==
Sougou is a practising Muslim, and observed fasting during the Islamic month of Ramadan.

== Career statistics ==
As of 23 May 2015

Appearances and goals by club, season and competition
Club	Season	League			Cup		Europe		Total	
Club	Season	Division	Apps	Goals	Apps	Goals	Apps	Goals	Apps	Goals
União Leiria	2004–05	Primeira Liga	7	0	?	?	0	0	7	0
Vitória Setúbal	2005–06	Primeira Liga	27	1	?	?	2	0	29	1
União Leiria	2006–07	Primeira Liga	15	5	?	?	0	0	15	5
União Leiria	2007–08	Primeira Liga	23	1	?	?	4	0	27	1
União Leiria	Total		38	6	?	?	4	0	42	6
Académica	2008–09	Primeira Liga	23	4	5	1	0	0	28	5
Académica	2009–10	Primeira Liga	29	9	6	1	0	0	35	10
Académica	2010–11	Primeira Liga	28	6	4	2	0	0	32	8
Académica	Total		80	19	15	4	0	0	95	23
CFR Cluj	2011–12	Liga I	33	10	0	0	0	0	33	10
CFR Cluj	2012–13	Liga I	11	1	1	0	9	4	21	5
CFR Cluj	Total		44	11	1	0	9	4	54	15
Marseille	2012–13	Ligue 1	14	0	2	1	0	0	16	1
Évian	2013–14	Ligue 1	29	4	4	1	0	0	33	5
Évian	2014–15	Ligue 1	24	2	3	0	0	0	27	2
Évian	Total		53	6	7	1	0	0	60	7
Career total			263	42	25	6	15	4	302	53

== Honours ==
CFR Cluj

- Liga I: 2011–12
