= Gerson Vieira =

Brazilian footballer (born 1992)

Gérson Vieira
Personal information
- Full name: Gérson Fraga Vieira
- Date of birth: 4 October 1992 (age 34)
- Place of birth: Porto Alegre, Brazil
- Height: 1.79 m (5 ft 10 in)
- Positions: Defensive midfielder; centre back

Team information
- Current team: Tai Po
- Number: 12

Youth career
- 2000–2013: Grêmio

Senior career*
Years	Team	Apps	(Gls)
2012–2016	Grêmio	0	(0)
2012	→ Oeste (loan)	0	(0)
2014	→ Red Bull Brasil (loan)	0	(1)
2014–2015	→ Atenas (loan)	26	(1)
2015–2016	→ Red Bull Brasil (loan)	8	(0)
2016	Mumbai City	14	(1)
2017	Atlético Tubarão	14	(1)
2017–2018	Mumbai City	17	(1)
2018	Renofa Yamaguchi	4	(0)
2018–2019	ATK	18	(1)
2019–2022	Simba		
2022	Aimoré	9	(0)
2022–2023	TRAU	20	(3)
2023–	Tai Po	15	(1)

International career
2007	Brazil U15		
2009	Brazil U17	14	(3)

Managerial career
- 2024–: Tai Po (assistant coach)
- * Club domestic league appearances and goals as of 17 May 2026

Gérson Fraga Vieira (born 4 October 1992), sometimes known as just Gérson, is a Brazilian professional footballer who currenetly plays as a defensive midfielder for Hong Kong Premier League club Tai Po. He is also the assistant coach of the club.

== Club career ==
Born in Porto Alegre, Gérson Vieira joined the youth academy of Grêmio at the age of eight. On 17 January 2012, he was loaned out to Oeste for the Paulista championship. On 8 January 2013, during the preseason, he was promoted to the senior team. However, he failed to make a significant impact in the first team and soon speculation arose in the media of him joining French second-tier club Angers on a loan deal.

On 13 December 2013, Gérson Vieira was loaned out to Red Bull Brasil, for the 2014 Paulista A2. On 20 April, he scored his first goal for the club in a 3–2 victory against Rio Branco. On 28 July 2014, he moved abroad and joined Uruguayan club Atenas on a loan deal. Gerson joined Red Bull Brasil, again on loan on 10 July 2015.

Gérson Vieira switched clubs and countries and joined Indian Super League franchise Mumbai City on 28 June 2016. He went on to score for the franchise in a 3–2 semifinal defeat against ATK. After the season ended, he returned to his native country and joined Atlético Tubarão in January 2017. On 28 July, Mumbai City announced that they had retained Gerson for the 2017–18 season. He captained the team five times during the season, with manager Alexandre Guimarães describing him as a key player during the two seasons. After the season ended, he terminated his contract with the club and moved to Japanese second-tier club Renofa Yamaguchi on 20 March 2018.

On 30 July 2018, Gérson Vieira returned to India and joined ATK. On 10 November he scored his first goal for ATK from a header in the 82 minute of the match as ATK won against FC Pune City by 1–0.

On 25 June 2019, Gérson Vieira joined Simba Sports Club which plays in the Tanzanian Premier League as well as the CAF Champions League.

In 2022, Gérson Vieira returned to India and signed with I-League club TRAU and made his league debut on 15 November in their 1–1 draw against rival Aizawl.

On 1 September 2023, Gérson Vieira joined Hong Kong Premier League club Tai Po.

== International career ==
Gérson Vieira has been capped at the youth international level. He went on to win the Mediterranean International Cup with the under-15 and under-17 team and was also awarded the best player of the tournament of the 2009 Sendai Cup held at Japan. He has played for the under-17 team in the 2009 FIFA U-17 World Cup and went on to collect 14 caps for the side.

== Career statistics ==
=== Club ===
As of match played on 21 October 2018

Club	Season	League			Cup		Other		Total	
Club	Season	Division	Apps	Goals	Apps	Goals	Apps	Goals	Apps	Goals
Grêmio	2013	Série A	0	0	0	0	4 (Note: Appearances in Campeonato Gaucho)	0	4	0
Oeste (loan)	2012	Paulista A1	0	0	0	0	2 (Note: Appearances in Campeonato Paulista)	0	2	0
Red Bull Brasil (loan)	2014	Série D	0	0	0	0	8	1	8	1
Atenas (loan)	2014–15	Primera División	26	1	0	0	—		26	1
Red Bull Brasil (loan)	2015	Série D	8	0	0	0	0	0	8	0
Red Bull Brasil (loan)	2016	Série D	0	0	1	0	2	0	3	0
Red Bull Brasil (loan)	Total		8	0	1	0	2	0	11	0
Mumbai City	2016	Indian Super League	14	1	—		—		14	1
Atlético Tubarão	2017	Catarinense A1	—		0	0	14	1	14	1
Mumbai City	2017–18	Indian Super League	17	0	0	0	—		17	0
Renofa Yamaguchi	2018	J2 League	4	0	0	0	—		4	0
ATK	2018–19	Indian Super League	4	0	0	0	—		4	0
Career total			73	2	1	0	30	2	104	4

== Honours ==
Tai Po

- Hong Kong Premier League: 2024–25
- Hong Kong FA Cup: 2025–26
- Hong Kong Senior Shield: 2025–26
