= Komal Thatal =

Indian footballer

Personal information
- Date of birth: 18 September 2000 (age 26)
- Place of birth: Sikkim, India
- Height: 1.63 m (5 ft 4 in)
- Position: Winger

Team information
- Current team: Kerala Blasters
- Number: 77

Youth career
- 2011–2014: Namchi Sports Hostel
- 2014–2017: AIFF Elite Academy

Senior career*
Years	Team	Apps	(Gls)
2018–2020	ATK	15	(1)
2020–2021	Mohun Bagan	5	(0)
2021–2024	Jamshedpur	11	(1)
2024–2025	Chennaiyin	0	(0)
2025–2026	Gokulam Kerala	2	(0)
2026–	Kerala Blasters	0	(0)

International career^{‡}
2014–2018	India U17	36	(8)
2019–2021	India U23	12	(0)
- * Club domestic league appearances and goals as of 18:43, 7 March 2026 (UTC) ‡ National team caps and goals as of 21:55, 28 January 2018 (UTC)

Komal Thatal (born 18 September 2000) is an Indian professional footballer who plays as a winger for Indian Super League club Kerala Blasters. Thatal has represented India in the U-17 FIFA World Cup in 2017.

== Career ==
Born in Sikkim, Thatal began playing competitive football in 2011 when he joined the Namchi Sports Academy of his native state. He spent three years at the academy before being advised by his coach to attend trials for the AIFF Elite Academy and India U17 side which would play in the 2017 FIFA U-17 World Cup. After impressing the coaches, Thatal joined the academy and team.

=== ATK ===
After the U-17 World Cup, Thatal decided against joining the rest of his teammates with Indian Arrows, a development team which was to play in the I-League. Instead, Thatal joined Indian Super League side ATK for the 2017–18 season. He made his professional debut for the club on 28 January 2018 in their match against Jamshedpur. Aged 17 years and 132 days, Thatal became the youngest footballer to play an Indian Super League match. He came on in stoppage time towards the end of the match as ATK were defeated 1–0. Thatal made only two appearances for ATK in the entire season.

ATK retained Thatal for the 2018–19 season. He made his first start for ATK in their opening fixture of the season against Delhi Dynamos which ATK won 1–2. On 31 October 2018, Thatal scored his first goal for ATK in the 15th minute against Bengaluru. However, ATK lost the game 1–2.

=== ATK Mohun Bagan ===
After the merger of ATK and Mohun Bagan, Thatal signed a two-year contract on a permanent deal basis. He made his debut for the club on 21 January 2021 at the 89th minute in their league match against Chennaiyin FC, winning 1–0.

=== Jamshedpur FC ===
On 20 August 2021, it was announced that Thatal has signed a 3-year contract with Jamshedpur FC. He scored his first goal on 9 December against Mumbai City FC in their 4–2 defeat.

== International ==
After passing the trials in 2014, Thatal joined the India U17 side which was to play in the 2017 FIFA U-17 World Cup in India. On 21 September 2017, Thatal was announced as part of the final 21-man squad for the U-17 World Cup. Thatal played in India's first match in the World Cup against the United States but was not included in the squad for India's final two matches in the tournament.

He has also played for the India U-23 and U-20 teams respectively. He represented India in the Asian Cup U23 Qualifiers.

== Career statistics ==
As of 9 December 2021

Club	Season	League			Cup		Continental		Total	
Club	Season	Division	Apps	Goals	Apps	Goals	Apps	Goals	Apps	Goals
ATK	2017–18	Indian Super League	2	0	1	0	—	—	3	0
ATK	2018–19	Indian Super League	12	1	2	0	—	—	14	1
ATK	2019–20	Indian Super League	1	0	3	0	—	—	4	0
ATK	ATK total		15	1	6	0	0	0	21	1
ATK Mohun Bagan	2020–21	Indian Super League	5	0	0	0	—	—	5	0
Jamshedpur	2021–22	Indian Super League	5	1	0	0	—	—	5	1
Career total			25	2	6	0	0	0	31	2

== Honours ==
ATK

- Indian Super League: 2019–20
