= Pranjal Bhumij =

Indian professional footballer

Personal information
- Full name: Pranjal Prakash Bhumij
- Date of birth: 2 March 1999 (age 27)
- Place of birth: Sivasagar, Assam, India
- Height: 1.66 m (5 ft 5 in)
- Position: Forward

Team information
- Current team: Rajasthan United
- Number: 9

Youth career
- 2011–2015: SAI Guwahati
- 2015–2016: DSK Shivajians

Senior career*
Years	Team	Apps	(Gls)
2016–2017	DSK Shivajians	4	(1)
2017–2023	Mumbai City	23	(1)
2022–2023	→ RoundGlass Punjab (loan)	10	(1)
2023–2024	Odisha	11	(0)
2024–	Rajasthan United	15	(1)

International career
2017–2018	India U19	3	(0)
- * Club domestic league appearances and goals as of 23:32, 17 March 2026 (UTC)

Pranjal Prakash Bhumij (born 2 March 1999) is an Indian professional footballer who plays as a forward for Indian Football League club Rajasthan United.

Although Pranjal prefers playing as a striker, he can also play as a winger on either side and as an attacking midfielder.

== Club career ==
=== DSK Shivajians ===
A youth product for DSK Shivajians, Bhumij made his professional debut for the first-team in the I-League on 26 February 2017 against Churchill Brothers. He came off the bench in the 60th minute for Naro Hari Shrestha as DSK Shivajians fell 3–0. He then scored his first professional goal for the club on 8 April 2017 against Shillong Lajong. He scored the equalizing goal for the club in the 63rd minute but despite that, Shillong Lajong scored a third in stoppage time to win 3–2.

=== Mumbai City ===
On 23 July 2017, Pranjal was picked up by Mumbai City as a developmental player for 2017–18 Hero ISL season. He committed to Mumbai City FC by signing a contract with the club till 2024.

== International career ==
In August 2017, Pranjal was called by India U19 coach Floyd Pinto before SAFF U19 Championship. Pranjal made his debut for India U19 against Nepal in Bhutan.

== Career statistics ==
=== Club ===
As of 13 April 2024

Club	Season	League			Cup		AFC		Total	
Club	Season	Division	Apps	Goals	Apps	Goals	Apps	Goals	Apps	Goals
DSK Shivajians	2016–17	I-League	4	1	1 (Note: Appearance(s) in Federation Cup)	0	—		5	1
Mumbai City	2017–18	Indian Super League	6	0	2 (Note: Appearance(s) in Super Cup)	0	—		8	0
Mumbai City	2018–19	Indian Super League	10	1	1	0	—		11	1
Mumbai City	2019–20	Indian Super League	2	0	0	0	—		2	0
Mumbai City	2020–21	Indian Super League	4	0	0	0	—		4	0
Mumbai City	2021–22	Indian Super League	1	0	0	0	1 (Note: Appearance(s) in AFC Champions League)	0	2	0
Mumbai City	Mumbai City total		23	1	3	0	1	0	27	1
RoundGlass Punjab (loan)	2022–23	I-League	10	1	1	0	—		11	1
Odisha	2023–24	Indian Super League	11	0	2	0	—		13	0
Career total			48	3	7	0	1	0	56	3
