= Arnold Issoko =

Congolese footballer (born 1992)

Personal information
- Full name: Arnold Nkufo Issoko
- Date of birth: 6 April 1992 (age 34)
- Place of birth: Kinshasa, Zaire
- Height: 1.85 m (6 ft 1 in)
- Positions: Right-back; winger

Youth career
- 2010–2011: Freamunde

Senior career*
Years	Team	Apps	(Gls)
2011–2012	Rebordosa	30	(9)
2012–2013	Limianos	28	(2)
2013–2015	Chaves	65	(8)
2013	→ Pedras Salgadas (loan)	5	(2)
2015–2018	Vitória Setúbal	84	(6)
2018–2019	Mumbai City	18	(3)
2019	Caen	1	(0)
2020	→ Farense (loan)	6	(1)
2020–2021	Cova da Piedade	24	(1)
2021–2022	Sporting da Covilhã	25	(2)
2022–2023	Sanjoanense	8	(0)

International career
2016–	DR Congo	1	(0)
- * Club domestic league appearances and goals as of 21 September 2021

Arnold Issoko (born 6 April 1992) is a Congolese professional footballer who plays mainly as a right-back but also as a right winger.

== International career ==
Issoko made his debut for the DR Congo national football team in a friendly 1–1 tie with Romania in May 2016.
