= Rafael Bastos =

Brazilian footballer (born 1985)

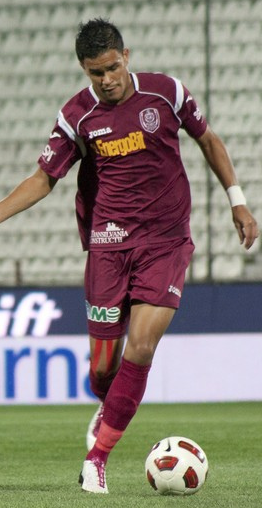
- Bastos with CFR Cluj in 2010

Personal information
- Date of birth: 1 January 1985 (age 41)
- Place of birth: Rio de Janeiro, Brazil
- Height: 1.85 m (6 ft 1 in)
- Positions: Attacking midfielder; forward

Team information
- Current team: Jacuipense

Youth career
- 2004–2006: Bahia

Senior career*
Years	Team	Apps	(Gls)
2006–2007	Bahia	20	(7)
2007–2008	Cruzeiro	–	(0)
2007–2008	→ Belenenses (loan)	12	(0)
2008	Nacional	7	(0)
2009	Vitória	12	(2)
2009	Consadole Sapporo	17	(1)
2010	Braga	8	(0)
2010–2013	CFR Cluj	66	(10)
2013–2014	Al Nassr	20	(11)
2014	Levski Sofia	8	(0)
2014–2015	Kuwait SC	0	(0)
2015	Figueirense	41	(4)
2016	América Mineiro	24	(3)
2016	Chapecoense	6	(0)
2016–2017	Hatta Club	9	(0)
2017	Buriram United	9	(4)
2018	CRB	0	(0)
2018	Remo	5	(0)
2018–2019	Mumbai City	19	(5)
2019	Juventude	12	(2)
2020–2021	Jacuipense	18	(3)
2023–	Vitória da Conquista		
- * Club domestic league appearances and goals as of 21 November 2023

Rafael Bastos (born 1 January 1985) is a Brazilian professional footballer who plays as an attacking midfielder or a forward for Brazilian League club Jacuipense.

== Career ==
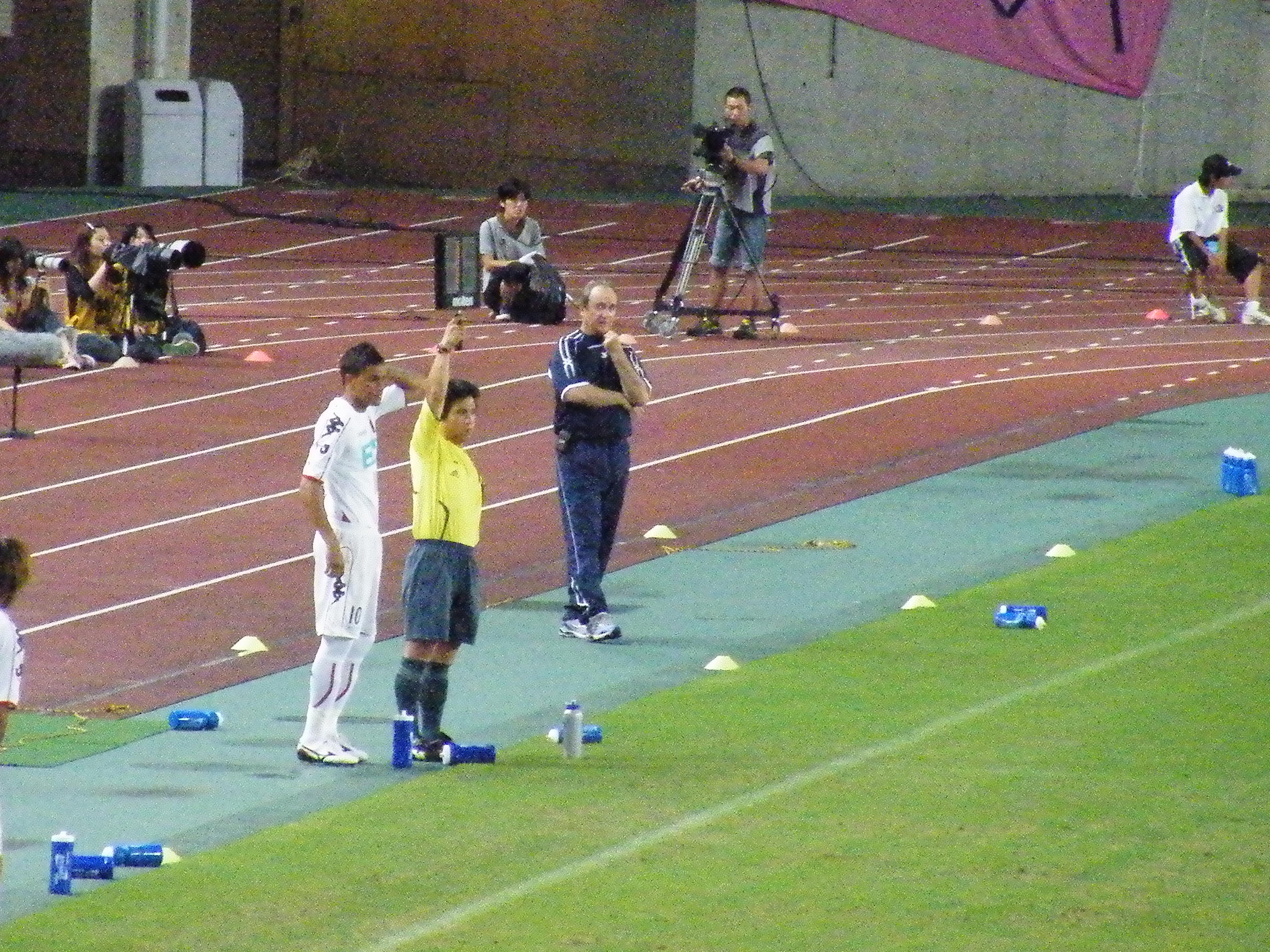
Bastos with Consadole Sapporo

=== Early career ===
Bastos was born in Rio de Janeiro. His previous club is Esporte Clube Bahia in Brazil. He won the league, called the Baiano League in 2007 with Esporte Clube Bahia. In August 2007, he was signed by C.F. Os Belenenses and under contract until 2008 with the Portuguese side.

=== Braga ===
On 1 January 2010, Rafael Bastos signed for Braga from Japanese club Consadole Sapporo until June 2011. Unfortunately, because of a conflict with the head coach, he played only eight matches for the team in 2010, even he started as regular in January. In July, Braga agreed with the release of the player. Then, Rafael Bastos signed with the Romanian team CFR Cluj.

=== CFR Cluj ===
On 20 September 2012, CFR 1907 Cluj enjoyed a dream start to UEFA Champions League group stage campaign against S.C. Braga, with Rafael Bastos scoring twice against his former club.

=== Al Nassr ===
On 22 December 2012, it was announced that Bastos signed a two-and-a-half-year contract worth $800k per year with Al Nassr FC for an undisclosed fee, though media report estimated it to be €2.7 million.

In February 2015, he returned to Brazil signing for Figueirense.

=== Buriram United ===
It was announced that Bastos would sign for Thai League club Buriram United on 19 May 2017.

=== Return to Brazil ===
Bastos returned to Brazil and joined Brasil on 19 December 2017 for the 2018 season. He struggled in getting playing time during his stint in the club. Subsequently, on 22 May, he switched to Remo.

=== Mumbai City ===
On 20 August 2018, Bastos joined Indian Super League franchise Mumbai City FC on a one-year deal.

== Career statistics ==
As of match played on 25 June 2018

Appearances and goals by club, season and competition
Club	Season	League			Cup		Other		Total	
Club	Season	Division	Apps	Goals	Apps	Goals	Apps	Goals	Apps	Goals
Belenenses	2007–08	Primeira Liga	12	0	2	0	0	0	14	0
Nacional	2008–09	Primeira Liga	7	0	2	0	—		9	0
Vitória	2009	Série A	0	0	0	0	12 (Note: Appearances in Campeonato Baiano)	2	12	2
Consadole Sapporo	2009	J2 League	17	1	0	0	—		17	1
Braga	2009–10	Primeira Liga	7	0	2	1	—		9	1
CFR Cluj	2010–11	Liga I	23	4	2	0	5 (Note: Appearances in UEFA Champions League)	0	30	4
CFR Cluj	2011–12	Liga I	27	3	0	0	—		27	3
CFR Cluj	2012–13	Liga I	16	3	2	1	10	2	28	6
CFR Cluj	Total		66	10	4	1	15	2	85	13
Al Nassr	2012–13	Saudi Professional League	11	7	2	1	—		13	8
Al Nassr	2013–14	Saudi Professional League	9	4	2	0	—		11	4
Al Nassr	Total		20	11	4	1	—		24	12
Levski Sofia	2013–14	A PFG	8	0	2	0	—		10	0
Al-Kuwait	2014–15	Kuwaiti Premier League	0	0	1	1	2 (Note: Appearances in AFC Cup)	0	3	1
Figueirense	2015	Série A	25	1	6	0	10 (Note: Appearances in Campeonato Catarinense)	3	41	4
América Mineiro	2016	Série A	5	1	5	1	14	1	24	3
Chapecoense	2016	Série A	6	0	0	0	1 (Note: Appearances in Copa Sudamericana)	0	7	0
Hatta Club	2016–17	UAE Pro-League	9	0	0	0	—		9	0
Buriram United	2017	Thai League T1	9	0	0	0	—		9	0
CRB	2018	Série B	0	0	10	0	10 (Note: Appearances in Campeonato Alagoano)	1	20	1
Remo	2018	Série C	5	0	0	0	—		5	0
Mumbai City	2018–19	Indian Super League	19	5	0	0	—		19	5
Career total			196	24	38	5	64	9	298	38
