= Hugo Boumous =

French footballer (born 1995)

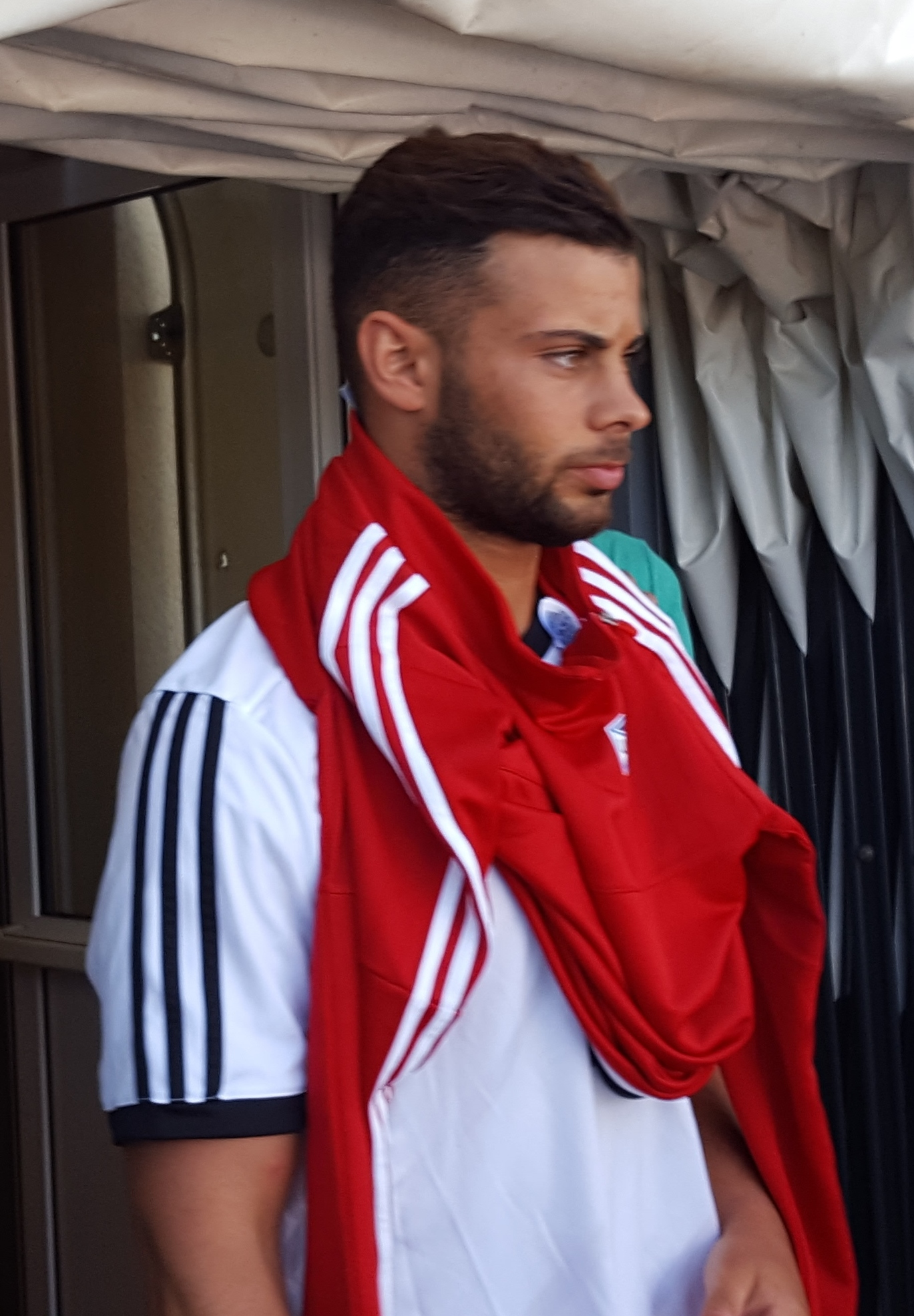
- Boumous in 2016

Personal information
- Full name: Adnan Hugo Boumous
- Date of birth: 24 July 1995 (age 31)
- Place of birth: Rennes, France
- Height: 1.72 m (5 ft 8 in)
- Position: Attacking midfielder

Team information
- Current team: Selangor
- Number: 9

Youth career
- 2010–2014: Laval

Senior career*
Years	Team	Apps	(Gls)
2013–2016	Laval II	52	(18)
2014–2016	Laval	72	(24)
2016–2018	Moghreb Tétouan	78	(12)
2018–2020	Goa	42	(16)
2020–2021	Mumbai City	16	(3)
2021–2024	Mohun Bagan	45	(11)
2024–2026	Odisha	24	(6)
2026	→ Selangor (loan)	6	(2)
2026–	Selangor	2	(0)
- * Club domestic league appearances and goals as of 28 June 2026

Adnan Hugo Boumous (born 24 July 1995) is a French professional footballer who plays as an attacking midfielder for Malaysia Super League club Selangor. He is best known for his passing and playmaking.

== Club career ==
=== Early career ===
Born in Rennes, Boumous graduated from the youth academy of Laval and made his debut with the reserves in 2013 after having joined the youth team two years earlier. In May 2015, he signed his first professional contract with the club and was promoted to the senior team. On 22 May 2015, he made his first team debut in the last round of Ligue 2, scoring a goal after having substituted in a 3–0 victory over Charmois Niortais.

On 20 July 2016, Boumous moved abroad and joined Moroccan Botola club Moghreb Tétouan, after agreeing to a three-year deal.

=== FC Goa ===
On 2 February 2018, he switched clubs and countries and joined Indian Super League franchise Goa as a replacement for Manuel Arana. Two days later, he made his debut in a 2–2 draw against NorthEast United FC. On 22 February, he scored his first goal in a 1–1 draw against Delhi Dynamos. He was the youngest foreign player in 2019–20, and he won the player of the tournament award in ISL-6.

=== Mumbai City ===
On 17 October 2020, Boumous signed for Mumbai City on a two-year deal, with a $200,000 transfer fee, the highest till that time in ISL.

=== Mohun Bagan ===
On 8 July 2021, Boumous signed for Mohun Bagan on a five-year deal for a record transfer fee of $280,000 breaking the record set by him in the previous season. He debuted for Mohun Bagan in the 2021–22 season opener against Kerala Blasters on 19 November, in which he scored twice in 4–2 win. As 2022–23 season began, he appeared with the club on 20 August against Rajasthan United at the 131st edition of Durand Cup, in which they were defeated by 3–2.

=== Odisha FC ===
On 4 June 2024, he joined Odisha FC for an undisclosed fees. On 28 June 2026, Boumous left Odisha after his contract was mutually terminated.

=== Selangor ===
On 20 January 2026, Boumous joined Malaysia Super League side Selangor on loan for the rest of the season, being handed the number 9 shirt. He started in his debut at Malaysia Cup on 23 January against Kelantan The Real Warriors. On 25 June 2026, Boumous signed a permanent deal with Selangor, on a two-year contract.

== International career ==
In May 2016, Boumous was called up to the Morocco under-23 football team for a friendly match against Cameroon. However, he was expelled from the team by the technical director after a video of Boumous smoking shisha surfaced in social media.

== Style of play ==
Goal.com wrote that Boumous "often picks the ball in the middle of the park or at times from an even deeper position...He can hold the ball and make those surging runs through the middle which makes him an exciting player to watch".

== Career statistics ==
=== Club ===
As of match played 27 June 2026

Appearances and goals by club, season and competition
Club	Season	League			National cup (Note: Includes Coupe de France, Super Cup, Malaysia FA Cup)		League Cup (Note: Includes Malaysia Cup)		Continental		Other		Total	
Club	Season	Division	Apps	Goals	Apps	Goals	Apps	Goals	Apps	Goals	Apps	Goal	Apps	Goal
Laval II	2013–14	Championnat National 3	7	0	—		—		—		—		7	0
Laval II	2014–15	Championnat National 3	22	7	—		—		—		—		22	7
Laval II	2015–16	Championnat National 3	22	4	—		—		—		—		22	4
Laval II	Total		51	11	—		—		—		—		51	11
Laval	2014–15	Ligue 2	1	1	1	0	—		—		—		2	1
Laval	2015–16	Ligue 2	0	0	1	0	—		—		—		1	0
Laval	Total		1	1	2	0	—		—		—		3	1
Moghreb Tétouan	2016–17	Botola	28	1	0	0	—		—		—		28	1
Moghreb Tétouan	2017–18	Botola	9	0	0	0	—		—		—		9	0
Moghreb Tétouan	Total		37	1	0	0	—		—		—		37	1
Goa	2017–18	Indian Super League	8	2	2	3	—		—		—		10	5
Goa	2018–19	Indian Super League	19	3	3	1	—		—		—		22	4
Goa	2019–20	Indian Super League	15	11	—		—		—		—		15	11
Goa	Total		42	16	5	4	—		—		—		47	20
Mumbai City	2020–21	Indian Super League	16	3	—		—		—		—		16	3
Mohun Bagan	2021–22	Indian Super League	17	5	—		—		2 (Note: Appearances in AFC Cup)	0	—		19	5
Mohun Bagan	2022–23	Indian Super League	20	5	3	1	—		2	0	4 (Note: 3 Appearances in Durand Cup and 1 in Indian club qualifiers for 2023–24 AFC competitions)	0	29	6
Mohun Bagan	2023–24	Indian Super League	8	1	3	0	—		7	1	5 (Note: Appearances in Durand Cup)	1	23	3
Mohun Bagan	Total		45	11	6	1	!0	0	11	1	9	1	71	14
Odisha	2024–25	Indian Super League	21	6	1	0	—		—		—		22	6
Selangor (loan)	2025–26	Malaysia Super League	6	2	0	0	2	0	0 (Note: Appearances in AFC Champions League Two)	0	6 (Note: Appearances in ASEAN Club Championship)	0	14	2
Selangor	2026–27	Malaysia Super League	0	0	0	0	0	0	—		0	0	0	0
Career total			219	51	14	5	2	0	11	1	15	1	261	58

== Honours ==
FC Goa

- Super Cup: 2019
- Indian Super League Shield: 2019–20

Mumbai City

- Indian Super League Shield: 2020–21
- Indian Super League: 2020–21

Mohun Bagan

- Indian Super League: 2022–23
- Durand Cup: 2023

Individual

- Indian Super League Golden Ball: 2019–20
