= Matías Mirabaje =

Uruguayan footballer (born 1989)

Personal information
- Full name: Claudio Matías Mirabaje Correa
- Date of birth: 6 March 1989 (age 37)
- Place of birth: Montevideo, Uruguay
- Height: 1.79 m (5 ft 10 in)
- Position: Attacking midfielder

Team information
- Current team: City Escaldes (youth coach)

Senior career*
Years	Team	Apps	(Gls)
2008–2010	Racing Club	43	(9)
2010–2011	Nacional	9	(0)
2011	Once Caldas	9	(1)
2011–2012	Montevideo Wanderers	10	(2)
2012–2015	San Lorenzo	10	(1)
2013	→ Argentinos Juniors (loan)	5	(0)
2014	→ Atlético Paranaense (loan)	0	(0)
2015	Patronato	3	(1)
2015–2016	Juventud	23	(3)
2016	Fénix	10	(2)
2017	Unión Comercio	20	(1)
2017–2018	Delhi Dynamos	12	(3)
2018–2019	Mumbai City	15	(1)
2019–2020	Racing Club	13	(2)
2020–2021	Real Potosí	4	(0)
2021–2021	Central Español	2	(0)
2021–2022	UE Engordany	12	(2)
2023	Atlètic Amèrica	5	(0)

International career
2009	Uruguay U20	1	(0)

Managerial career
- 2024–: City Escaldes (youth coach)
- * Club domestic league appearances and goals

Claudio Matías Mirabaje Correa (born March 6, 1989, in Montevideo) is a retired Uruguayan footballer who played as an attacking midfielder and currently a youth coach working for City Escaldes in Andorra.

== International career ==
Mirabaje has played for the Uruguay under-20 team at the 2009 FIFA U-20 World Cup in Egypt.

== Coaching career ==
After retiring at the end of 2023, Mirabaje stayed in Andorra and started coaching at City Escaldes in the beginning of 2024.

== Statistics ==
Club	Season	League	Domestic League		Domestic Cups		Continental Cups		Total	
Club	Season	League	Apps	Goals	Apps	Goals	Apps	Goals	Apps	Goals
Racing	2008-2009	Primera División	23	2	2	0	-	-	25	2
Racing	2009-2010	Primera División	20	7	-	-	8	2	28	9
Nacional	2010–2011	Primera División	9	0	-	-	-	-	9	0
Once Caldas	2010–2011	Categoría Primera A	9	1	2	0	9	1	20	2
Montevideo Wanderers	2011–2012	Primera División	9	2	-	-	-	-	9	2
Total	Career		70	12	4	0	17	3	91	15

== Titles ==
Nacional

- Uruguayan Primera División: 2010-11
