= 2019 AIFF Super Cup =

2019 Super Cup
Hero Super Cup
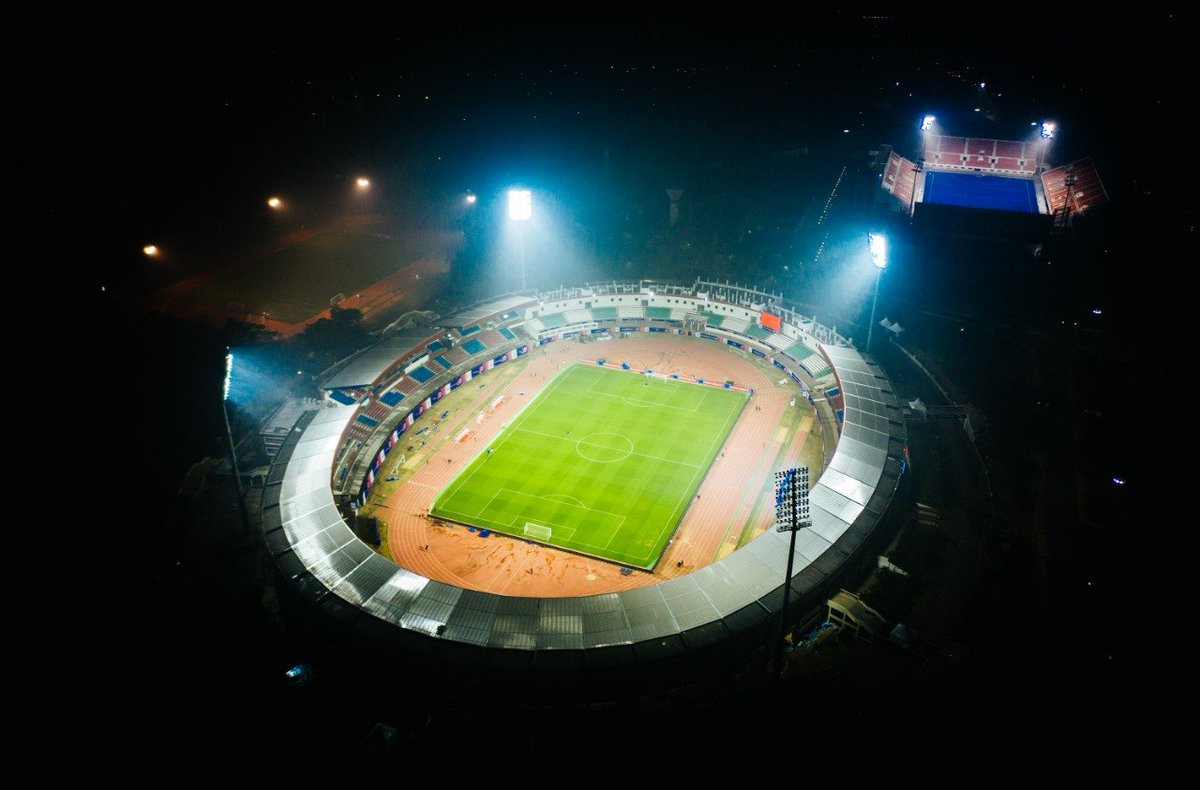
- Kalinga Stadium hosted the final on 13 April 2019

Tournament details
- Country: India
- Venue(s): Kalinga Stadium, Bhubaneswar
- Dates: 15 March – 13 April
- Teams: 20

Final positions
- Champions: Goa (1st title)
- Runners-up: Chennaiyin

Tournament statistics
- Matches played: 12
- Goals scored: 45 (3.75 per match)
- Attendance: 5,920 (493 per match)
- Top goal scorer(s): Coro (5 goals)

The 2019 AIFF Super Cup, officially known as the 2019 Hero Super Cup for sponsorship reasons, was the second edition of the Super Cup and the 40th season of the national knockout football competition in India. The competition was sponsored by Hero MotoCorp. The competition began with the qualifiers on 15 March at Kalinga Stadium in Bhubaneshwar and was concluded with the final on 13 April.

Bengaluru were the defending champions but lost to Chennai City in the quarter-finals. Goa won the title by defeating Chennaiyin 2–1 in the final.

== Teams ==
A total of 16 teams are participating in the competition proper. The top six teams from both the I-League and Indian Super League qualified for the Super Cup automatically while the bottom four sides have participated in the qualifiers. Before the qualification round, seven I-League clubs — Minerva Punjab, East Bengal, Mohun Bagan, NEROCA, Gokulam Kerala and Aizawl announced they would withdraw from Super Cup, citing "unfair treatment to I-League clubs."

Qualification round (8 teams) (Note: Teams listed based on final position in either I-League or Indian Super League.)	Main competition (12 teams) (Note: Teams listed based on final position in either I-League or Indian Super League.)
I-League: Aizawl (withdrawn); Indian Arrows; Gokulam Kerala (withdrawn); Minerva Punjab (withdrawn); Indian Super League: Pune City; Delhi Dynamos; Kerala Blasters; Chennaiyin	I-League: Chennai City; East Bengal (withdrawn); Real Kashmir; Churchill Brothers (withdrawn); Mohun Bagan (withdrawn); NEROCA (withdrawn); Indian Super League: Bengaluru; Goa; Mumbai City; NorthEast United; Jamshedpur; ATK

== Schedule ==
Phase	Round	Match dates
Qualification round		15–16 March 2019
Main tournament	Round of 16	29 March – 3 April 2019
Main tournament	Quarter-finals	4–7 April 2019
Main tournament	Semi-finals	9–10 April 2019
Main tournament	Final	13 April 2019

== Bracket ==
Qualification round
15 March
Kerala Blasters	0
Indian Arrows	2

Round of 16
31 March
Pune City	2
Chennai City	4
30 March
Indian Arrows	0
Goa	3
29 March
Chennaiyin	2
Mumbai City	0
1 April
ATK	3
Real Kashmir	1

Quarter-finals
4 April
Bengaluru	1
Chennai City	2
6 April
Goa	4
Jamshedpur	3
7 April
Chennaiyin	2
NorthEast United	1
5 April
Delhi Dynamos	3
ATK	4

Semi-finals
9 April
Chennai City	0
Goa	3
10 April
Chennaiyin	2
ATK	0

Final
13 April
Goa	2
Chennaiyin	1

== Qualification round ==
After the conclusion of the I-League and Indian Super League seasons, the All India Football Federation announced the draw for the qualification round of the Super Cup. Before the qualification round, seven I-League clubs — Minerva Punjab, East Bengal, Mohun Bagan, NEROCA, Gokulam Kerala, and Aizawl — announced they would withdraw from Super Cup, citing "unfair treatment to I-League clubs."

15 March 2019
20:30 IST

Kerala Blasters	0–2	Indian Arrows
	Report	Kiyam 39', 77' (pen.)

Kalinga Stadium, Bhubaneswar
Attendance: 250
Referee: Crystal John

== Round of 16 ==
Chennai City F.C. had announced they would withdraw from the tournament along with other I-League clubs but eventually decided to participate.

29 March 2019
20:30 IST

Chennaiyin	2–0	Mumbai City
Vineeth 42'; Lalpekhlua 43'	Report

Kalinga Stadium, Bhubaneswar
Attendance: 300
Referee: Ajit Meetei
30 March 2019
17:00 IST

Indian Arrows	0–3	Goa
	Report	Coro 17' (pen.); Boumous 60'; Peña 81'

Kalinga Stadium, Bhubaneswar
Attendance: 350
Referee: Rahul Kumar Gupta
31 March 2019
20:30 IST

Pune City	2–4	Chennai City
Marcelinho 42'; Stanković 57' (pen.)	Report	Manzi 35', 40', 62' (pen.); Rodríguez 74'

Kalinga Stadium, Bhubaneswar
Attendance: 350
Referee: Tejas Nagvenkar
1 April 2019
20:30 IST

ATK	3–1	Real Kashmir
B. Singh 26'; Lanzarote 79'; Santos 83'	Report	Robertson 31'

Kalinga Stadium, Bhubaneswar
Attendance: 270
Referee: Santosh Kumar

== Quarter-finals ==
4 April 2019
20:30 IST

Bengaluru	1–2	Chennai City
Chhetri 65'	Report	Gordillo 15'; Manzi 55'

Kalinga Stadium, Bhubaneswar
Attendance: 1,000
Referee: Ajit Meetei
5 April 2019
20:30 IST

Delhi Dynamos	3–4	ATK
Dhot 15'; Lalhlimpuia 35'; Kumar 72'	Report	B. Singh 23', 33', 51'; Lanzarote 28'

Kalinga Stadium, Bhubaneswar
Attendance: 450
Referee: Venkatesh R
6 April 2019
20:30 IST

Goa	4–3	Jamshedpur
Bedia 23'; B. Fernandes 45+2'; S. Fernandes 64'; Coro 74' (pen.)	Report	Morgado 71'; Cidoncha 77'; Calvo 84' (pen.)

Kalinga Stadium, Bhubaneswar
Attendance: 200
Referee: Rahul Kumar Gupta
7 April 2019
20:30 IST

Chennaiyin	2–1	NorthEast United
Alves 33'; Thapa 40'	Report	Borges 9'

Kalinga Stadium, Bhubaneswar
Attendance: 300
Referee: Santosh Kumar

== Semi-finals ==
9 April 2019
20:30 IST

Chennai City	0–3	Goa
	Report	Coro 26' (pen.), 35'; B. Fernandes 70'

Kalinga Stadium, Bhubaneswar
Attendance: 250
Referee: Santosh Kumar
10 April 2019
20:30 IST

Chennaiyin	2–0	ATK
Vineeth 51'; Thapa 58'	Report

Kalinga Stadium, Bhubaneswar
Attendance: 700
Referee: Rahul Kumar Gupta

== Final ==
13 April 2019
20:30 IST

Goa	2–1	Chennaiyin
Coro 51'; B. Fernandes 64'	Report	Augusto 54'

Kalinga Stadium, Bhubaneswar
Attendance: 1,500
Referee: Ajit Meetei

== Top scorers ==
As of 13 April 2019

Rank	Player	Club	Goals
1	(Spain) Coro	Goa	5
2	(India) Balwant Singh	ATK	4
2	(Spain) Pedro Manzi	Chennai City	4
4	(India) Brandon Fernandes	Goa	3
5	(India) Anirudh Thapa	Chennaiyin	2
5	(India) C.K. Vineeth	Chennaiyin	2
5	(Spain) Manuel Lanzarote	ATK	2
5	(India) Amarjit Singh Kiyam (Note: Goals in qualification round)	Indian Arrows	2
9	20 players		1
