= Coro (footballer) =

Spanish footballer (born 1983)

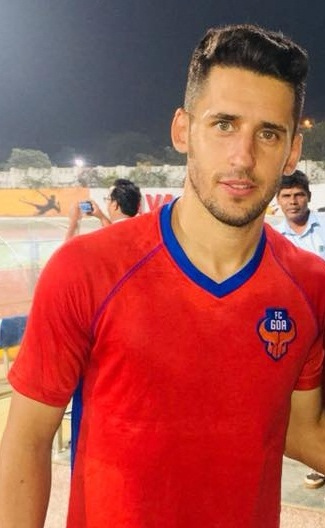
- Coro with Goa in 2018

Personal information
- Full name: Ferran Corominas Telechea
- Date of birth: 5 January 1983 (age 43)
- Place of birth: Banyoles, Spain
- Height: 1.71 m (5 ft 7 in)
- Position: Forward

Youth career
- 1990–1997: Banyoles
- 1997–2000: Vilobí
- 2000–2001: Espanyol

Senior career*
Years	Team	Apps	(Gls)
2001–2004	Espanyol B	98	(35)
2003–2011	Espanyol	165	(14)
2011	→ Osasuna (loan)	6	(0)
2011–2012	Girona	40	(18)
2012–2015	Elche	112	(17)
2015–2016	Mallorca	16	(1)
2016–2017	Doxa	18	(5)
2017–2020	Goa	57	(48)
2020–2021	Atlético Baleares	21	(3)
Total		533	(141)

International career
2001	Spain U17	2	(1)
2001–2002	Spain U19	7	(1)
2003	Spain U20	6	(0)
2003–2011	Catalonia	8	(1)
- * Club domestic league appearances and goals

Ferran Corominas Telechea (born 5 January 1983), known as Coro, is a Spanish former professional footballer who played as a forward.

He spent the majority of his 20-year career with Espanyol, appearing in 200 competitive games while scoring 24 goals and winning the 2006 Copa del Rey with the club. In 2017 he signed with Goa in the Indian Super League, winning several team and individual accolades and also being at one point the competition's all-time top-scorer.

Coro won the 2002 European Under-19 Championship with Spain.

== Club career ==
=== Espanyol ===
Born in Banyoles, Girona, Catalonia, Coro was a product of Espanyol's youth system. He made his first-team debut on 2 November 2003 in a 2–0 home loss to Real Zaragoza, but spent his first professional seasons with the reserve side in the Segunda División B.

In the last matchday of 2005–06, on 13 May 2006, Coro scored a last-minute goal against Real Sociedad, with that 1–0 win saving Espanyol's La Liga status and Alavés being relegated instead. He added another in the final of the Copa del Rey, in a 4–1 defeat of Zaragoza.

Coro finished 2006–07 with four league goals in 30 games, adding five in 11 matches in the team's runner-up run in the UEFA Cup, including one apiece in both legs of the semi-final clash against Werder Bremen. In the following three years he totalled 75 league appearances with six goals, alternating between the substitutes bench and the starting XI.

=== Girona and Elche ===
In mid-January 2011, completely ostracised by manager – and former teammate at Espanyol – Mauricio Pochettino, Coro signed with fellow top-division club Osasuna on loan until the end of the campaign. He spent the following seasons competing in the Segunda División, appearing and scoring regularly for Girona and Elche; he helped the latter return to the top flight in his first year after an absence of 24 years.

=== Goa ===
On 18 July 2017, 34-year-old Coro signed for Indian Super League franchise Goa after a brief stint in the Cypriot First Division with Doxa Katokopias. He scored his first goal for the club on 19 November, finding the net in the 25th minute of a 3–2 away victory over Chennaiyin. Two hat-tricks followed on 30 November and 9 December, helping the hosts defeat Bengalaru (4–3) and Kerala Blasters (5–2), and he eventually won the Golden Boot with 18 goals.

On 30 April 2018, Coro renewed his contract by one year. He continued his good form the following season by scoring a league-best 16 goals, also being awarded the Golden Ball and helping his team reach the finals.

On 25 May 2019, Coro agreed to another extension at the Fatorda Stadium. He left at the end of 2019–20; with two back-to-back Golden Boots claimed during his tenure – he also lost the individual accolade in his last season to Nerijus Valskis by one goal– he was the only player in the competition's history to achieve this feat.

=== Later career ===
Coro joined Atlético Baleares on 29 September 2020. The following June, he left.

== Career statistics ==
As of match played on 7 March 2020

Appearances and goals by club, season and competition
Club	Season	League			Cup		Other		Total	
Club	Season	Division	Apps	Goals	Apps	Goals	Apps	Goals	Apps	Goals
Espanyol B	2001–02	Segunda División B	28	8	—		5 (Note: Appearances in Segunda División B play-offs)	0	33	8
Espanyol B	2002–03	Segunda División B	38	8	—		—		38	8
Espanyol B	2003–04	Segunda División B	32	19	—		—		32	19
Espanyol B	Total		98	35	—		5	0	103	35
Espanyol	2003–04	La Liga	2	0	1	1	—		3	1
Espanyol	2004–05	La Liga	25	1	1	0	—		26	1
Espanyol	2005–06	La Liga	32	3	6	1	7 (Note: Appearances in UEFA Cup)	0	45	4
Espanyol	2006–07	La Liga	30	4	4 (Note: Includes two appearances in Supercopa de España)	0	11	6	45	10
Espanyol	2007–08	La Liga	26	2	2	1	—		28	3
Espanyol	2008–09	La Liga	26	3	2	1	—		28	4
Espanyol	2009–10	La Liga	23	1	0	0	—		23	1
Espanyol	2010–11	La Liga	1	0	1	0	—		2	0
Espanyol	Total		165	14	17	4	18	6	200	24
Osasuna (loan)	2010–11	La Liga	6	0	0	0	—		6	0
Girona	2011–12	Segunda División	40	18	0	0	—		40	18
Elche	2012–13	Segunda División	42	12	1	0	—		43	12
Elche	2013–14	La Liga	36	5	2	0	—		38	5
Elche	2014–15	La Liga	34	0	4	0	—		38	0
Elche	Total		112	35	7	0	—		119	35
Mallorca	2015–16	Segunda División	16	1	1	0	—		17	1
Doxa	2016–17	Cypriot First Division	18	5	4	3	—		22	8
Goa	2017–18 (Note: Appearances in Super Cup)	Indian Super League	20	18	3	2	—		23	20
Goa	2018–19	Indian Super League	20	16	4	5	—		24	21
Goa	2019–20	Indian Super League	17	14	0	0	—		17	14
Goa	Total		57	48	7	7	—		64	55
Career total			464	138	36	14	23	6	523	158

== Honours ==
Espanyol

- Copa del Rey: 2005–06
- UEFA Cup runner-up: 2006–07

Elche

- Segunda División: 2012–13

Goa

- ISL League Winners Shield: 2019–20
- Super Cup: 2019

Spain U19

- UEFA European Under-19 Championship: 2002

Spain U20

- FIFA U-20 World Cup runner-up: 2003

Individual

- Indian Super League Golden Boot: 2017–18, 2018–19
- Super Cup Golden Boot: 2019
- Football Players' Association of India Foreign Player of the Year: 2019
