= Manuel Lanzarote =

Spanish footballer

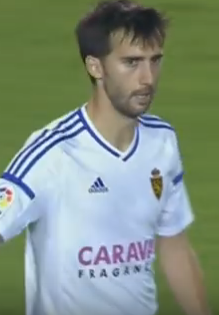
- Lanzarote with Zaragoza in 2016

Personal information
- Full name: Manuel Lanzarote Bruno
- Date of birth: 20 January 1984 (age 42)
- Place of birth: Barcelona, Spain
- Height: 1.78 m (5 ft 10 in)
- Positions: Winger; attacking midfielder

Youth career
- 1993–1994: Sant Gabriel
- 1994–2003: Barcelona

Senior career*
Years	Team	Apps	(Gls)
2002–2005	Barcelona C	48	(12)
2004–2005	Barcelona B	3	(0)
2005–2007	Lleida	14	(0)
2006	→ Atlético Madrid B (loan)	12	(0)
2007	Oviedo	9	(2)
2007–2010	Sant Andreu	109	(27)
2010	Atlético Baleares	1	(0)
2010–2011	Eibar	38	(11)
2011–2013	Sabadell	71	(23)
2013–2015	Espanyol	17	(1)
2015	→ Alavés (loan)	20	(3)
2015–2016	Asteras Tripolis	11	(0)
2016–2017	Zaragoza	52	(11)
2017–2018	Goa	19	(13)
2018–2019	ATK	14	(5)
2019–2020	Sabadell	22	(4)
2020	Sant Andreu	7	(0)
2021	Chennaiyin	5	(1)
Total		472	(113)
- * Club domestic league appearances and goals

Manuel 'Manu' Lanzarote Bruno (born 20 January 1984) is a Spanish former professional footballer who played as a left winger or an attacking midfielder.

He amassed Segunda División totals of 151 matches and 37 goals over six seasons, representing Lleida, Sabadell, Alavés and Zaragoza. He made 17 appearances in La Liga with Espanyol, and also played in Greece and India.

== Club career ==
Born in Barcelona, Catalonia, Lanzarote finished his youth career with FC Barcelona, and played his first three years as a senior with the C and B teams. In summer 2005 he signed with neighbouring UE Lleida in Segunda División, but after being sparingly used in the first part of the season, moved to Atlético Madrid B on loan in January 2006.

Lanzarote returned to Lleida in June, but after again seeing limited playing time he joined Real Oviedo also of the third division in January 2007. After being relegated with the Asturians, he signed for UE Sant Andreu from Tercera División.

Lanzarote scored eight goals in his first year with his new club, helping it return to division three at the first attempt. In his second he netted 14 times in all competitions, as the team went on to miss out on two consecutive promotions in the play-offs.

On 19 August 2010, Lanzarote joined CD Atlético Baleares also in the third tier. Twelve days later, he terminated his contract and moved to SD Eibar in the same league after paying his buyout clause of €20,000 himself.

After scoring 11 times for the Armeros, Lanzarote signed with CE Sabadell FC. He played his first game in the second division nearly six years on 27 August 2011, starting in a 2–1 home win against SD Huesca. His first goal came on 26 October, in a 2–2 draw at Xerez CD.

Lanzarote scored 14 goals in the 2012–13 campaign, and on 5 February 2013 he agreed a three-year deal with La Liga side RCD Espanyol, effective as of July. On 24 August he appeared in his first top-flight match, coming on as a late substitute and providing the assist for Thievy's last goal in a 3–1 home victory over Valencia CF.

Lanzarote scored his only goal in the Spanish top tier on 15 September 2013, the game's only away against Granada CF through a free kick. After being rarely used in 2014–15, he was loaned to second-division team Deportivo Alavés on 20 January 2015, until June.

On 2 July 2015, Lanzarote cut ties with Espanyol. Two days later, the 31-year-old moved abroad for the first time in his career and signed for two years with Asteras Tripolis F.C. in Greece. On 29 January 2016, club and player parted ways by mutual consent and he joined Real Zaragoza on a six-month contract the following day.

On 23 August 2017, Lanzarote signed for FC Goa. On 6 June 2018, he moved to fellow Indian Super League franchise ATK.

Lanzarote returned to Spain and Sabadell on 14 August 2019, helping in another promotion to the second division. He rejoined Sant Andreu roughly one year later, with the side now in the league below.

On 11 January 2021, Lanzarote joined Chennaiyin FC for the remainder of the season as an injury replacement for Rafael Crivellaro, in a return to the Indian top flight.

== Career statistics ==
As of match played on 21 October 2018

Club	Season	League			Cup		Other		Total	
Club	Season	Division	Apps	Goals	Apps	Goals	Apps	Goals	Apps	Goals
Barcelona B	2004–05	Segunda División B	3	0	—		—		3	0
Lleida	2005–06	Segunda División	8	0	4	0	—		12	0
Lleida	2006–07	Segunda División B	6	0	2	0	—		8	0
Lleida	Total		14	0	6	0	—		20	0
Atlético Madrid B (loan)	2005–06	Segunda División B	12	0	—		—		12	0
Oviedo	2006–07	Segunda División B	9	2	—		—		9	2
Sant Andreu	2008–09	Segunda División B	34	13	1	1	2 (Note: Appearances in Segunda División B play-offs)	0	37	14
Sant Andreu	2009–10	Segunda División B	33	6	3	1	5	0	41	7
Sant Andreu	Total		67	19	4	2	7	0	78	21
Atlético Baleares	2010–11	Segunda División B	1	0	0	0	—		1	0
Eibar	2010–11	Segunda División B	34	9	0	0	4	2	38	11
Sabadell	2011–12	Segunda División	36	9	0	0	—		36	9
Sabadell	2012–13	Segunda División	35	14	2	0	—		37	14
Sabadell	Total		71	23	2	0	—		73	23
Espanyol	2013–14	La Liga	17	1	4	0	—		21	1
Espanyol	2014–15	La Liga	0	0	2	0	—		2	0
Espanyol	Total		17	1	6	0	—		23	1
Alavés (loan)	2014–15	Segunda División	20	3	0	0	—		20	3
Asteras Tripolis	2015–16	Super League Greece	11	0	1	1	4 (Note: Appearances in UEFA Europa League)	0	16	1
Zaragoza	2015–16	Segunda División	16	5	0	0	—		16	5
Zaragoza	2016–17	Segunda División	36	6	0	0	—		36	6
Zaragoza	Total		52	11	0	0	—		52	11
Goa	2017–18	Indian Super League	19	13	0	0	—		19	13
ATK	2018–19	Indian Super League	14	5	3	2	—		17	7
Career total			343	77	19	3	15	2	377	82
