= List of Jamshedpur FC players =

Jamshedpur Football Club is a professional association football club based in Jamshedpur, India, that plays in Indian Super League. The club was formed in 2017 and played its first competitive match on 18 November 2017, and hold NorthEast United FC 0–0 tie.

== List of players ==
The list includes all the players registered under an Jamshedpur FC contract. Some players might not have featured in a professional game for the club.

Name	Nat	Pos^{[NB]}	Jamshedpur FC career	Apps	Goals	Ref
Subrata Pal	(India)	Goalkeeper	2017–2020	49	0	
Sanjiban Ghosh	(India)	Goalkeeper	2017-2018	2	0	
André Bikey	(Cameroon)	Defender	2017-2018	17	0	
Tiri	(Spain)	Defender	2017-2020	49	3	
Sairuat Kima	(India)	Defender	2017-2018	1	0	
Anas Edathodika	(India)	Defender	2017-2018	10	0	
Robin Gurung	(India)	Defender	2017-2020	26	0	
Shouvik Ghosh	(India)	Defender	2017-2018	10	0	
Yumnam Raju	(India)	Midfielder	2017-2019	16	2	
Memo	(Brazil)	Midfielder	2017-2020	57	3	
Mehtab Hossain	(India)	Midfielder	2017-2018	13	0	
Matheus Gonçalves	(Brazil)	Midfielder	2017-2018	17	4	
Souvik Chakrabarti	(India)	Midfielder	2017-2018	18	0	
Bikash Jairu	(India)	Midfielder	2017-2020	35	0	
Siddharth Singh	(India)	Forward	2017-2018	5	0	
Jerry Mawihmingthanga	(India)	Forward	2017-2019	30	1	
Farukh Choudhary	(India)	Forward	2017–present	54	3	
Sameehg Doutie	(South Africa)	Forward	2017-2018	7	0	
Ashim Biswas	(India)	Forward	2017-2018	8	2	
Izu Azuka	(Nigeria)	Forward	2017-2018	17	3	
Kervens Belfort	(Haiti)	Forward	2017-2018	16	0	
Sumit Passi	(India)	Forward	2017-2020	30	3	
Rafique Ali Sardar	(India)	Goalkeeper	2017-2020	6	0	
Karan Amin	(India)	Defender	2018–present	8	0	
Wellington Priori	(Brazil)	Midfielder	2018	11	3	
Talla N'Diaye	(Senegal)	Forward	2017-2018	0	0	
Subhasish Roy Chowdhury	(India)	Goalkeeper	2018-2019	3	0	
Raju Gaikwad	(India)	Defender	2018-2019	5	0	
Pratik Chaudhari	(India)	Defender	2018-2019	10	0	
Augustin Fernandes	(India)	Defender	2019-2020	3	1	
Dhanachandra Singh	(India)	Defender	2018-2019	9	0	
Swarup Das	(India)	Midfielder	2018-2019	1	0	
Asifullah Khan	(India)	Midfielder	2018-2019	0	0	
Sergio Cidoncha	(Spain)	Midfielder	2018-2019	13	4	
Mario Arqués	(Spain)	Midfielder	2018-2019	18	3	
Malsawmzuala	(India)	Midfielder	2018-2019	4	0	
Tim Cahill	(Australia)	Midfielder	2018-2019	11	2	
Carlos Calvo	(Spain)	Midfielder	2018-2020	16	5	
Michael Soosairaj	(India)	Midfielder	2018-2019	14	4	
Mobashir Rahman	(India)	Forward	2018–present	22	0	
Pablo Morgado	(Spain)	Forward	2018-2019	14	4	
Gourav Mukhi	(India)	Forward	2018-2020	4	1	
Niraj Kumar	(India)	Goalkeeper	2019-2020	0	0	
Amrit Gope	(India)	Goalkeeper	2018-2020	0	0	
Narender Gahlot	(India)	Defender	2019–present	11	0	
Jitendra Singh	(India)	Defender	2019–present	8	0	
Joyner Lourenco	(India)	Defender	2019–present	10	0	
Sandip Mandi	(India)	Defender	2020–present	7	0	
Aitor Monroy	(Spain)	Midfielder	2019-2021	37	1	
Noé Acosta	(Spain)	Midfielder	2019-2020	15	3	
C. K. Vineeth	(India)	Midfielder	2019-2020	10	1	
Piti	(Spain)	Midfielder	2019-2020	6	1	
Issac Vanmalsawma	(India)	Midfielder	2019-2021	25	1	
Sergio Castel	(Spain)	Forward	2019-2020	11	7	
David Grande	(Spain)	Forward	2019-2021	14	4	
Aniket Jadhav	(India)	Forward	2018-2021	27	2	
Amarjit Singh Kiyam	(India)	Midfielder	2018-2021	8	0	
Nerijus Valskis	(Lithuania)	Forward	2020–present	18	8	
Alex Lima	(Brazil)	Midfielder	2020–present	19	0	
Pawan Kumar	(India)	Goalkeeper	2020–present	2	0	
Rehenesh TP	(India)	Goalkeeper	2020–present	19	0	
Peter Hartley	(England)	Defender	2020–present	19	2	
Stephen Eze	(Nigeria)	Defender	2020–present	20	4	
William Lalnunfela	(India)	Forward	2020–present	11	0	

== Notable foreign internationals ==
- (Australia) Tim Cahill

== List of overseas players ==
The list includes all the overseas players registered under an Jamshedpur FC contract. Some players might not have featured in a professional game for the club.

Name	Nat	Pos^{[NB]}	Jamshedpur FC career	Apps	Goals	Ref
André Bikey	(Cameroon)	Defender	2017-2018	17	0	
Tiri	(Spain)	Defender	2017-2020	49	3	
Memo	(Brazil)	Midfielder	2017–present	57	3	
Matheus Gonçalves	(Brazil)	Midfielder	2017-2018	17	4	
Sameehg Doutie	(South Africa)	Forward	2017-2018	7	0	
Izu Azuka	(Nigeria)	Forward	2017-2018	17	3	
Kervens Belfort	(Haiti)	Forward	2017-2018	16	0	
Wellington Priori	(Brazil)	Midfielder	2018	11	3	
Talla N'Diaye	(Senegal)	Forward	2017-2018	0	0	
Sergio Cidoncha	(Spain)	Midfielder	2018-2019	13	4	
Mario Arqués	(Spain)	Midfielder	2018-2019	18	3	
Tim Cahill	(Australia)	Midfielder	2018-2019	11	2	
Carlos Calvo	(Spain)	Midfielder	2018-2020	16	5	
Pablo Morgado	(Spain)	Forward	2018-2019	14	4	
Aitor Monroy	(Spain)	Midfielder	2019–present	18	1	
Noé Acosta	(Spain)	Midfielder	2019–present	15	3	
Piti	(Spain)	Midfielder	2019–present	6	1	
Sergio Castel	(Spain)	Forward	2019–present	11	7	
David Grande	(Spain)	Forward	2019–present	8	1	
Nerijus Valskis	(Lithuania)	Forward	2020–present	0	0	
Alex Lima	(Brazil)	Midfielder	2020–present	0	0	
Peter Hartley	(England)	Defender	2020–present	0	0	
Stephen Eze	(Nigeria)	Defender	2020–present	0	0	
