= 2018–19 Jamshedpur FC season =

2018–19 season of Jamshedpur FC

Jamshedpur
2018–19 season
- CEO: Mukul Choudhari
- Head Coach: (Spain) César Ferrando
- Stadium: JRD Tata Sports Complex
- ISL: 5th
- Finals: Did not qualify
- Super Cup: Quarter-finals
- Top goalscorer: (Spain) Pablo Morgado (India) Michael Soosairaj (Spain) Carlos Calvo (4 goals each)
- Highest home attendance: 23,050 vs. Chennaiyin (25 November 2018)
- Lowest home attendance: 14,678 vs. Bengaluru (27 February 2019)
- Average home league attendance: 20,016

The 2018–19 season was the second season of competitive football played by Jamshedpur.

== Background ==
The 2017–18 season was Jamshedpur's first ever season after they were awarded one of two expansion slots into the Indian Super League. After winning the expansion slot, the club announced the signing of their first head coach, Steve Coppell. The club then went on the assemble their inaugural season squad, bringing in India international Anas Edathodika as their first player and the Spanish defender, Tiri, as their first foreign player.

Jamshedpur played their first game on 18 November 2017 against NorthEast United. Despite being down a man due to a sending off, the club managed to hold on for a 0–0 draw. The club then played their first match at home on 1 December against ATK, which turned out to be another 0–0 draw. Throughout the season, scoring goals was a problem for Jamshedpur, with Coppell stating at the halfway mark of the campaign that scoring goals was "a big priority for us". Despite that, Jamshedpur would go on to end the season in fifth, one place below a finals spot, with only 16 goals scored, tied second-lowest in the league in that category.

=== Squad changes ===
Less than a week after their last match of the 2017–18 ISL season, Jamshedpur confirmed their first signing for the next season as Chennai City midfielder Michael Soosairaj. The club then announced that they had retained goalkeeper Subrata Pal, defenders Tiri, Yumnam Raju, midfielders Memo, Wellington Priori, Bikash Jairu, and forwards Farukh Choudhary and Sumeet Passi. Then, on 17 April 2018, the club announced their second signing, defender Pratik Chaudhari of Delhi Dynamos. Nine days later, the club announced their third signing, goalkeeper Subhasish Roy Chowdhary of Kerala Blasters.

==== In ====
Position	Player	Transferred from	Fee	Date	Ref
MF	(India) Michael Soosairaj	(India) Chennai City	Free	10 March 2018	
DF	(India) Pratik Chaudhari	Delhi Dynamos	Free	17 April 2018	
GK	(India) Subhasish Roy Chowdhury	Kerala Blasters	Free	26 April 2018	

== Pre-season and friendlies ==
Jamshedpur FC departed for Madrid, Spain on 14 August 2018 to take part in the pre-season camp. The team will be playing five practice matches in the duration of a month-long tour. The team will be training at the Los Ángeles de San Rafael facility in Spain. This training facility is famous for hosting the preseason for La Liga giants Atlético de Madrid. The team will be playing practice matches during the preseason with teams such as Atlético Madrid B, Gimnástica Segoviana CF, Torrelodones C.F., CD Móstoles URJC. etc which majorly are from second and third division of Spain.

25 August 2018 Friendly	Torrelodones CF	0–1	Jamshedpur	Torrelodones, Madrid
13:00 IST		Report	Memo 47'	Stadium: Los Ángeles de San Rafael Facility Ground

29 August 2018 Friendly	S.S. Reyes	3–0	Jamshedpur	San Sebastián de los Reyes, Madrid
14:00 IST	Sergio Castle 41'; Andy Escudero 71'; Giovanni Navarro 73'	Report		Stadium: Los Ángeles de San Rafael Facility Ground

5 September 2018 Friendly	Gimnástica Segoviana	1–1	Jamshedpur	Segovia, Madrid
23:30 IST	35'	Report	Gourav Mukhi 82'	Stadium: Los Ángeles de San Rafael Facility Ground

8 September 2018 Friendly	Móstoles URJC	0–3	Jamshedpur	Móstoles, Madrid
14:30 IST		Report	Gourav Mukhi 68', 70'; Tiri 81'	Stadium: Estadio El Soto

12 September 2018 Friendly	Atlético Madrid B	0-1	Jamshedpur	Majadahonda, Madrid
20:30 IST		Report	Sergio Cidoncha 54'	Stadium: Estadio Cerro del Espino

== Competitions ==
=== Indian Super League ===
==== Table ====
Pos	Team	Pld	W	D	L	GF	GA	GD	Pts	Qualification
3	Mumbai City	18	9	3	6	25	20	+5	30	Advance to ISL Playoffs
4	NorthEast United	18	7	8	3	22	18	+4	29	Advance to ISL Playoffs
5	Jamshedpur	18	6	9	3	29	21	+8	27	
6	ATK	18	6	6	6	18	22	−4	24	
7	Pune City	18	6	4	8	24	30	−6	22	

Source: Indian Super League
Rules for classification: 1) points; 2) head-to-head points; 3) head-to-head goal difference; 4) head-to-head goals scored; 5) goal difference; 5) number of goals scored; 6) fair play ranking; 6) drawing of lots

== Player statistics ==
No.	Pos.	Name	ISL		Super Cup		Total		Discipline	
No.	Pos.	Name	Apps	Goals	Apps	Goals	Apps	Goals	A yellow rectangular card	A red rectangular card
Goalkeepers
1	GK	(India) Subrata Pal	0	0	0	0	0	0	0	0
13	GK	(India) Rafique Ali Sardar	1	0	0	0	1	0	0	0
29	GK	(India) Subhasish Roy Chowdhury	1	0	0	0	1	0	0	0
Defenders
2	DF	(India) Sanjay Balmuchu	1	0	0	0	1	0	0	0
3	DF	(India) Raju Gaikwad	1	0	0	0	1	0	1	0
4	DF	(Spain) Tiri	1	0	0	0	1	0	1	0
5	DF	(India) Pratik Chaudhari	0	0	0	0	0	0	0	0
16	DF	(India) Robin Gurung	0	0	0	0	0	0	0	0
25	DF	(India) Dhanachandra Singh	0	0	0	0	0	0	0	0
26	DF	(India) Yumnam Raju	1	0	0	0	1	0	0	0
27	DF	(India) Karan Amin	1	0	0	0	1	0	0	0
Midfielders
6	MF	(Spain) Mario Arqués	1	1	0	0	1	1	1	0
7	MF	(Spain) Pablo Morgado	1	1	0	0	1	1	0	0
8	MF	(India) Vishal Das	0	0	0	0	0	0	0	0
10	MF	(India) Jerry Mawihmingthanga	1	0	0	0	1	0	0	0
15	MF	(India) Mobashir Rahman	1	0	0	0	1	0	0	0
19	MF	(Spain) Carlos Calvo	1	0	0	0	1	0	0	0
21	MF	(India) Bikash Jairu	1	0	0	0	1	0	0	0
22	MF	(Brazil) Memo	1	0	0	0	1	0	0	0
23	MF	(India) Michael Soosairaj	0	0	0	0	0	0	0	0
Forwards
11	FW	(India) Farukh Choudhary	1	0	0	0	1	0	0	0
12	FW	(India) Sumeet Passi	1	0	0	0	1	0	0	0
17	FW	(Australia) Tim Cahill	0	0	0	0	0	0	0	0
20	FW	(Spain) Sergio Cidoncha	1	0	0	0	1	0	0	0
28	FW	(India) Gourav Mukhi	1	0	0	0	1	0	0	0

=== Goalscorers ===
Player	Goals
(Spain) Sergio Cidoncha	2
(Spain) Mario Arques	1
(India) Gourav Mukhi	1
(Spain) Pablo Morgado	1

== See also ==
- 2018–19 in Indian football
- Jamshedpur FC
