= 2017–18 Jamshedpur FC season =

2017–18 season of Jamshedpur FC

Jamshedpur
2017–18 season
- CEO: Mukul Choudhari
- Head Coach: Steve Coppell
- Stadium: JRD Tata Sports Complex (Eight matches); Kalinga Stadium (One match)
- ISL: 5th
- Finals: Did not qualify
- Super Cup: Quarter-finals
- Top goalscorer: League: Matheus Gonçalves (4 goals); All: Matheus Gonçalves (4 goals)
- Highest home attendance: 24,212 vs. Chennaiyin (28 December 2017)
- Lowest home attendance: 8,178 vs. Bengaluru (25 February 2018)
- Average home league attendance: 21,123
Home colours	Away colours

The 2017–18 season was the first ever season of competitive football played by Jamshedpur. The team, along with Bengaluru, entered the Indian Super League as two new expansion teams. They played their first competitive match on 18 November 2017 while playing their last match of the season on 12 April 2018. The club ended their first Indian Super League campaign in fifth place, thus missing out on the chance to participate in the finals. Jamshedpur also participated in the Super Cup, being eliminated by Goa in the quarter-finals.

Jamshedpur signed former Manchester City manager, Steve Coppell, as their first head coach in July. Coppell was in charge of fellow Super League side Kerala Blasters the previous season, leading the side to the final. India international Anas Edathodika became Jamshedpur's first player when he was drafted by the club during the players draft. Spanish defender Tiri was soon signed as the club's first foreign player. Other players recruited included those with previous ISL experience such as Sameehg Doutie, Memo, Kervens Belfort, André Bikey, and Matheus Gonçalves.

The season started for Jamshedpur with three consecutive draws before earning their first victory away at Delhi Dynamos. The first half of the season saw Jamshedpur six points off fourth place. During the second half of the season Jamshedpur managed to gain five victories. However a draw and three defeats, including the loss against Goa during their last league stage match, meant that the club would miss out on qualification for the finals. During the Super Cup, Jamshedpur defeated the I-League champions Minerva Punjab in the first round before being defeated by Goa in the quarter-finals.

During their inaugural season, every player in the squad played at least one match, whether as a starter or substitute, while as a whole, the club scored 16 goals. Jamshedpur also managed to earn eight clean sheets, with seven of them being won by their number one goalkeeper, Subrata Pal. Matheus Gonçalves ended the campaign as Jamshedpur's top scorer with four goals, all scored in the Indian Super League.

== Background ==
On 11 May 2017, it was announced by the Indian Super League organizers, Football Sports Development, that they would be inviting bids for new teams to join the league for the upcoming season. On 12 June, it was officially announced that Bengaluru FC (for Bengaluru) and Tata Group (for Jamshedpur) had won the bids for the new teams.

After winning the expansion bid to enter the Indian Super League, on 14 July 2017, Tata announced that the inaugural head coach for the Jamshedpur franchise would be Steve Coppell. Coppell, the previous ISL season, had led the Kerala Blasters to the league final.

Construction on the team for the first season began on 23 July 2017 when Jamshedpur, along with the other nine clubs, took part in the 2017–18 ISL Players Draft. Jamshedpur, being a brand new team, were one of two teams who participated in all 15 rounds of the draft. They also had first pick for the first two rounds. India international Anas Edathodika was the first pick to be made by Jamshedpur and thus became the first player in Jamshedpur history. At the end of the draft, Jamshedpur were composed of fifteen players, including Edathodika: Subrata Pal, Mehtab Hossain, Souvik Chakrabarti, Robin Gurung, Bikash Jairu, Jerry Mawihmingthanga, Shouvik Ghosh, Sairuat Kima, Sanjiban Ghosh, Farukh Choudhary, Sumeet Passi, Yumnam Raju, Ashim Biswas, and Siddharth Singh.

After participating in the draft, Jamshedpur made their first foreign player signing on 28 July 2017 when they signed Spanish defender Tiri. Tiri had played two seasons with fellow Indian Super League side ATK. The team proceeded to sign foreign players who had played in the ISL in past seasons such as André Bikey, Matheus Goncalves, Memo, Sameehg Doutie, and Kervens Belfort.

Jamshedpur made their first in-season squad change on 7 January 2018 when midfielder Wellington Priori replaced Talla N'Diaye.

=== Signings ===
==== Indian draft ====
Round	Position	Player
1	DF	(India) Anas Edathodika
2	GK	(India) Subrata Pal
3	MF	(India) Mehtab Hossain
4	DF	(India) Souvik Chakrabarti
5	DF	(India) Robin Gurung
6	MF	(India) Bikash Jairu
7	MF	(India) Jerry Mawihmingthanga
8	DF	(India) Shouvik Ghosh
9	DF	(India) Sairuat Kima
10	GK	(India) Sanjiban Ghosh
11	FW	(India) Farukh Choudhary
12	FW	(India) Sumeet Passi
13	DF	(India) Yumnam Raju
14	FW	(India) Ashim Biswas
15	FW	(India) Siddharth Singh

==== Other signings ====
Position	Player	Last club	Date	Ref
DF	(Spain) Tiri	(Spain) Marbella	28 July 2017	
MF	(South Africa) Sameehg Doutie	(South Africa) Ajax Cape Town	8 August 2017	
MF	(Brazil) Memo	(Brazil) Fluminense	10 August 2017	
FW	(Haiti) Kervens Belfort	(Azerbaijan) Zira	18 August 2017	
DF	(Cameroon) André Bikey	(England) Port Vale	29 August 2017	
MF	(Brazil) Matheus Gonçalves	(Brazil) Flamengo	1 September 2017	
FW	(Senegal) Talla N'Diaye	(Lebanon) Al-Ansar	2 September 2017	
GK	(India) Rafique Ali Sardar	Tata Football Academy	10 November 2017	
FW	(Nigeria) Izu Azuka	(Northern Cyprus) Mağusa Türk Gücü	18 November 2017	
MF	(Brazil) Wellington Priori	(Thailand) Pattaya United	7 January 2018	
DF	(India) Karan Amin	(India) PIFA	31 January 2018	
Left Club Midseason
FW	(Senegal) Talla N'Diaye	Released	7 January 2018	

== Pre-season ==
15 October 2017 Friendly	Jamshedpur	1–0	Chiangmai United	Chiang Mai
	Mawihmingthanga 53'	Report

18 October 2017 Friendly	Jamshedpur	2–1	Chiangmai	Chiang Mai
	Hossain 36'; Doutie 66'	Report	18'

23 October 2017 Friendly	Jamshedpur	3–2	Bangkok United	Chiang Mai
	Doutie; Goncalves; Biswas	Report

25 October 2017 Friendly	Jamshedpur	0–3	Pattaya United	Chiang Mai
		Report

29 October 2017 Friendly	Jamshedpur	2–1	BEC Tero Sasana	Chiang Mai
	Choudhary 63'; Biswas 71'	Report

== Indian Super League ==
The 2017–18 season of the Indian Super League sees 10 teams play 18 matches during the regular season; two against each other team, with one match at each club's stadium. Three points are awarded for each win, one point per draw, and none for defeats. At the end of the regular season, the top four teams in the table qualify for the finals. The team in first will take on the team in fourth and the team in second will take on the team in third in two-legged ties. The winners of each tie will face off in the final at the Salt Lake Stadium in Kolkata on 17 March 2018.

Jamshedpur began their first ever season away from home against NorthEast United on 18 November 2017. Jamshedpur defender André Bikey was sent off in the 77th minute – eight minutes after coming on as a substitute – after a high-booted challenge on NorthEast United forward Luis Alfonso Páez. Despite their man disadvantage, Jamshedpur managed to hold NorthEast United to a 0–0 draw. The same result would occur only six days later in Jamshedpur's second match against the Kerala Blasters at the Jawaharlal Nehru Stadium.

The club entered December with their home opener against ATK at the JRD Tata Sports Complex. Despite the home advantage, Steve Coppell's men finished the match with another 0–0 draw. After the match, Coppell said that Jamshedpur being held scoreless for three matches wasn't a problem and that he was happy that the team were able to keep three consecutive clean sheets to start the season. In their next match, Jamshedpur returned to the road as they took on the Delhi Dynamos at the Jawaharlal Nehru Stadium. Despite the match being goalless at halftime, Jamshedpur soon scored their first ever goal with Izu Azuka heading the ball past opposing goalkeeper Albino Gomes in the 61st minute. Jamshedpur would go on to win the match 1–0, their first three points ever and their fourth consecutive clean sheet.

Despite the victory, Jamshedpur would go on to lose for the first time in their next match against Pune City. Adil Khan scored the only goal in the 30th minute at the JRD Tata Sports Complex. It would be eleven days before Jamshedpur's next match against the other new entrants of the Indian Super League, Bengaluru. Despite being out-possessed for the majority of the match, Jamshedpur earned a penalty late in the match through Sameehg Doutie. Matheus Gonçalves converted the penalty to win the match for Jamshedpur 1–0. The club then ended the month of December at home against Chennaiyin. Despite the home advantage, a penalty goal by Jeje Lalpekhlua saw Jamshedpur fall 1–0 to end the year.

Entering 2018, Steve Coppell stated that he was desperate for Jamshedpur to start scoring goals, having only scored two in their first seven matches. "That hasn't happened so far even with the penalty but I'm confident that we will score goals and the sooner the better. It's a big priority for us," he stated. Jamshedpur played their first match of the year on 5 January at home against Mumbai City. Despite going down early through a goal from Thiago Santos, Jamshedpur's Izu Azuka managed to score a brace right before halftime to give Coppell's men the lead. However, Thiago Santos found an equalizer for Mumbai City in the 71st minute as the match ended 2–2. The match saw the return of Anas Edathodika, who had been injured since the first match of the season.

Jamshedpur's next match would be away at Goa, who had the league's top scorer in Coro. The match was billed to be one between the league's best attack (Goa) and the league's best defense (Jamshedpur). During the match, despite the defensive work put in by Jamshedpur, it was Goa who managed to take the lead going into halftime. Brandon Fernandes was brought down in the box by André Bikey and Manuel Lanzarote converted the penalty a second time after the first one, which he also scored, was disallowed. Jamshedpur soon pulled one back in the 54th minute with Matheus Gonçalves scoring the equalizer. However, it was Goa who would take the three points as Lanzarote again found the back of the net after a throughball from Brandon Fernandes. Goa would win 2–1.

Jamshedpur then returned home on 17 January 2018 for their match against the Kerala Blasters. Steve Coppell made a few changes going into this match including giving new signing Wellington Priori his debut and giving Yumnam Raju and Ashim Biswas their first starts of the season. The game started in the best way possible for Jamshedpur with Jerry Mawihmingthanga scoring just 22 seconds into the match, the fastest goal scored in Indian Super League history. Afterwards, Ashim Biswas made it 2–0 in the 31st minute before Mark Sifneos scored the consolation for the Blasters three minutes into second half stoppage time. Jamshedpur managed to hold on in the end for a 2–1 victory.

Four days later, Jamshedpur hosted last place Delhi Dynamos. Steve Coppell opted for the same line-up that earned Jamshedpur victory in their last match against the Kerala Blasters. The match started out in the worst way for Jamshedpur as they found themselves down 2–0 by the 22nd minute with Kalu Uche securing a brace through two headers. Tiri however was able to get one back for Jamshedpur in the 29th minute and Yumnam Raju scored the equalizer almost ten minutes into the second half. Matheus Gonçalves then scored the winner in the 86th minute off a pass from Wellington Priori. The 3–2 victory moved Jamshedpur to 5th place, only behind fourth placed Goa on goal difference.

After the match against Delhi Dynamos, Jamshedpur began a run of three straight away games. On 24 January 2018, the club took on Pune City at the Balewadi Stadium. Despite Wellington Priori putting the club up 1–0 in the 29th minute, two defensive lapses saw Pune City take the lead 2–1 by the 66th minute a take the three points. Jamshedpur's next match away against ATK at the Salt Lake Stadium would be a better result. Matheus Gonçalves gave Jamshedpur the lead in the 66th minute from the penalty spot as the club won 1–0.

Jamshedpur entered the month of February with a match against Mumbai City at the Mumbai Football Arena. Jamshedpur took the lead in the 37th minute after Farukh Choudhary dribbled into the box and his attempted shot was deflected into the net by Sanju Pradhan. Éverton Santos then equalized for Mumbai City in the 79th minute before substitute Bikash Jairu scored the winner for Jamshedpur five minutes later. Subrata Pal meanwhile earned the Hero of the Match award after making five crucial saves for Jamshedpur. Ten days later, the club returned home where they took on NorthEast United. Wellington Priori won the game for Jamshedpur with an overhead kicked goal in the 51st minute. The match ended 1–0 to Jamshedpur, with the club cementing themselves in fourth place.

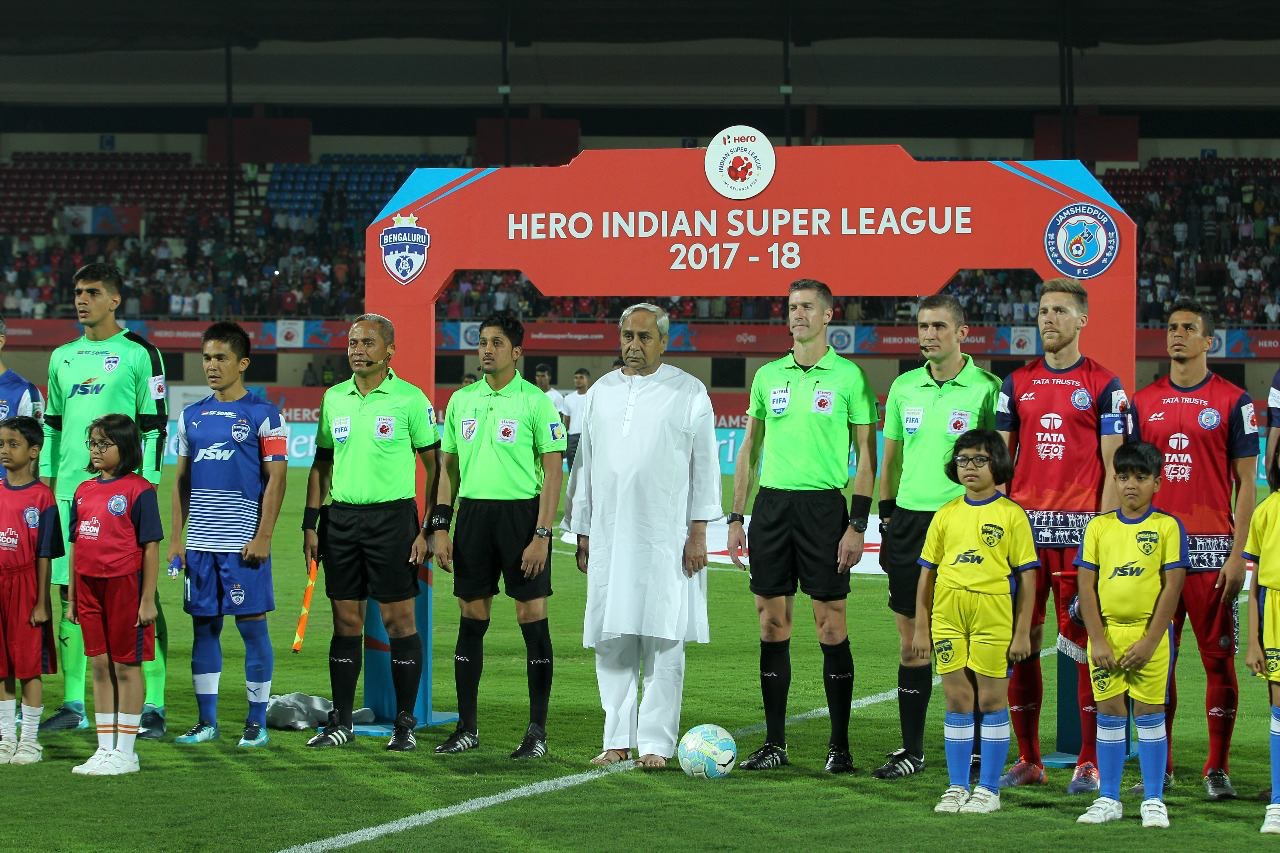
Jamshedpur and Bengaluru before their match at the Kalinga Stadium

After taking an eight-day break in between matches, Jamshedpur played their final away match of the season against Chennaiyin. Despite Coppell's men taking the during the first half through Wellington Priori, Chennaiyin found the equalizer in the 88th minute from Mohammed Rafi. The score would remain 1–1 for the rest of the match. The club then returned home but in a different venue as the Kalinga Stadium was used for the final two matches of the season by Jamshedpur. In their first match at the new venue, Jamshedpur took on league leaders Bengaluru. The new home didn't help for Jamshedpur as they fell 2–0 to goals from Miku and Sunil Chhetri.

The defeat to Bengaluru meant that Jamshedpur had to win their final match against Goa to stand any chance of qualification for the playoffs. Unfortunately, the match did not go at all the way Jamshedpur would have wanted. Subrata Pal was sent off after only seven minutes after handling a ball just outside his penalty area. With Jamshedpur down to 10-men and using their backup goalkeeper, Sanjiban Ghosh, who had not made a single appearance till that point, the club fell to Goa. Indian Super League top scorer Coro scored the opening goal of the match in the 29th minute before doubling his tally in the 51st minute. Manuel Lanzarote then scored the third goal for Goa in the 69th minute to confirm their 3–0 victory.

After the defeat and being eliminated from finals contention, Coppell said that the match was lost after Pal's dismissal: "Losing the goalkeeper early and playing the rest of the match with 10 players, including new goalkeeper Sanjiban Ghosh who made his debut, created a void which was hard to fill."

18 November 2017 1	NorthEast United	0–0	Jamshedpur	Guwahati
20:00 IST		Report	Memo (yellow card) 32'; Bikey (red card) 77'; Doutie (yellow card) 78'	Stadium: Indira Gandhi Athletic Stadium; Attendance: 21,151

24 November 2017 2	Kerala Blasters	0–0	Jamshedpur	Kochi
20:00 IST	Berbatov (yellow card) 73'; Lakić-Pešić (yellow card) 85'	Report	Hossain (yellow card) 56'; Mawihmingthanga (yellow card) 61'; Choudhary (yellow card) 66'	Stadium: Jawaharlal Nehru Stadium; Attendance: 36,752; Referee: Ranjit Bakshi

1 December 2017 3	Jamshedpur	0–0	ATK	Jamshedpur
20:00 IST		Report		Stadium: JRD Tata Sports Complex; Attendance: 23,891; Referee: Santosh Kumar

6 December 2017 4	Delhi Dynamos	0–1	Jamshedpur	Delhi
20:00 IST		Report	Azuka (yellow card) 55'; Azuka 61'	Stadium: Jawaharlal Nehru Stadium; Attendance: 7,953; Referee: Raul Gupta

10 December 2017 5	Jamshedpur	0–1	Pune City	Jamshedpur
17:30 IST	Azuka (yellow card) 26'; Mehtab (yellow card) 55'	Report	Alfaro (yellow card) 26'; Khan 30'; Marcelinho (yellow card) 57'; Diego Carlos (yellow card) 70'; Lalchhuanmawia (yellow card) 72' (yellow-red card) 81'	Stadium: JRD Tata Sports Complex; Attendance: 23,913; Referee: Ajit Meetei

21 December 2017 6	Bengaluru	0–1	Jamshedpur	Bangalore
20:00 IST	Paartalu (yellow card) 66'; Bose 90+1'	Report	Choudhary (yellow card) 88'; Gonçalves 90+1'	Stadium: Sree Kanteerava Stadium; Attendance: 12,564; Referee: C. R. Srikrishna

28 December 2017 7	Jamshedpur	0–1	Chennaiyin	Jamshedpur
20:00 IST		Report	Lalpekhlua 41' (pen.)	Stadium: JRD Tata Sports Complex; Attendance: 24,212; Referee: Ranjit Bakshi

5 January 2018 8	Jamshedpur	2–2	Mumbai City	Jamshedpur
20:00 IST	Azuka 43', 45+1'	Report	Thiago Santos 24', 71'	Stadium: JRD Tata Sports Complex; Attendance: 21,350; Referee: Rowan Arumughan

11 January 2018 9	Goa	2–1	Jamshedpur	Margao
20:00 IST	Lanzarote 45+1' (pen.), 60'	Report	Gonçalves 54'	Stadium: Fatorda Stadium; Attendance: 17,128; Referee: R Venkatesh

17 January 2018 10	Jamshedpur	2–1	Kerala Blasters	Jamshedpur
20:00 IST	Mawihmingthanga 1'; Biswas 31'	Report	Sifneos 90+3'	Stadium: JRD Tata Sports Complex; Attendance: 21,240; Referee: Raul Gupta

21 January 2018 11	Jamshedpur	3–2	Delhi Dynamos	Jamshedpur
17:30 IST	Tiri 29'; Raju 54'; Gonçalves 86'	Report	Uche 20', 22'	Stadium: JRD Tata Sports Complex; Attendance: 22,244; Referee: Pranjal Banerjee

24 January 2018 12	Pune City	2–1	Jamshedpur	Pune
20:00 IST	G. Singh 62'; Alfaro 66'	Report	Priori 29'	Stadium: Balewadi Stadium; Attendance: 6,612; Referee: Santosh Kumar

28 January 2018 13	ATK	0–1	Jamshedpur	Kolkata
20:00 IST		Report	Gonçalves 66' (pen.)	Stadium: Salt Lake Stadium; Attendance: 11,663; Referee: Umesh Bora

1 February 2018 14	Mumbai City	1–2	Jamshedpur	Mumbai
20:00 IST	Santos 79'	Report	Pradhan 37' (o.g.); Jairu 84'	Stadium: Mumbai Football Arena; Attendance: 5,138; Referee: Rowan Arumughan

10 February 2018 15	Jamshedpur	1–0	NorthEast United	Jamshedpur
20:00 IST	Priori 51'	Report		Stadium: JRD Tata Sports Complex; Attendance: 23,953; Referee: Santosh Kumar

18 February 2018 16	Chennaiyin	1–1	Jamshedpur	Chennai
20:00 IST	Rafi 88'	Report	Priori 32'	Stadium: Jawaharlal Nehru Stadium; Attendance: 13,195; Referee: Ajitkumar Lairenlakpam

25 February 2018 17	Jamshedpur	0–2	Bengaluru	Bhubaneswar
20:00 IST		Report	Miku 23' (pen.); Chhetri 34'	Stadium: Kalinga Stadium; Attendance: 8,178; Referee: Matthew Conger

4 March 2018 18	Jamshedpur	0–3	Goa	Jamshedpur
17:30 IST		Report	Corominas 29', 51'; Lanzarote 69'	Stadium: JRD Tata Sports Complex; Attendance: 23,386; Referee: R Venkatesh

=== Table ===
Pos	Team	Pld	W	D	L	GF	GA	GD	Pts	Qualification or relegation
3	Goa	18	9	3	6	42	28	+14	30	Qualification for ISL play-offs
4	Pune City	18	9	3	6	30	21	+9	30	Qualification for ISL play-offs
5	Jamshedpur	18	7	5	6	16	18	−2	26	
6	Kerala Blasters	18	6	7	5	20	22	−2	25	
7	Mumbai City	18	7	2	9	25	29	−4	23	

Source: Indian Super League
Rules for classification: 1) points; 2) head-to-head points; 3) head-to-head goal difference; 4) head-to-head goals scored; 5) goal difference; 5) number of goals scored; 6) fair play ranking; 6) drawing of lots

=== Results summary ===
Overall								Home						Away					
Pld	W	D	L	GF	GA	GD	Pts	W	D	L	GF	GA	GD	W	D	L	GF	GA	GD
18	7	5	6	16	18	−2	26	3	2	4	8	12	−4	4	3	2	8	6	+2

Last updated: 6 March 2018.
Source: http://www.indiansuperleague.com/isl-2017/schedule-fixtures

== Super Cup ==
The Super Cup is a knockout football competition in India. The 2018 edition was the first ever tournament. The competition only featured teams from both the Indian Super League and the I-League, India's two top-tier football leagues. As Jamshedpur finished in fifth place during the 2017–18 ISL season, the club entered the main competition directly which was hosted at the Kalinga Stadium in Bhubaneswar.

Jamshedpur were drawn to face Minerva Punjab on 2 April 2018. Minerva Punjab had finished the 2017–18 I-League as champions. Prior to the start of the tournament, before any of the teams knew the tournament format, Jamshedpur head coach, Steve Coppell, said negative comments about it: "I don't think the Super Cup is anyone's favourite competition. You know for it to take place. Now we are at the end of the ISL and nobody knows exactly where the tournament is when it begins. From my point of view it's nonsense. If it's a strategically important competition then surely by now in March we would know the details." Additionally, it was also reported that Jamshedpur's opponents, Minerva Punjab, expressed wanting to pull out of the competition.

Eventually the match did occur, with Coppell deciding to start backup goalkeeper Sanjiban Ghosh while also giving rightback Robin Gurung his first appearance of the season. The match ended goalless after full-time and remained deadlock at 0–0 after extra time. In penalties, Ghosh was essential in leading Jamshedpur to victory as he made three saves while Jamshedpur won the penalty shootout 5–4. In the quarter-finals, Jamshedpur were drawn to face fellow ISL side Goa. Brandon Fernandes gave Goa the lead during the firsthalf before halftime saw a total of six red cards, three of them to Jamshedpur. Kervens Belfort, Anas Edathodika, and goalkeeper Subrata Pal were the ones sent off for Jamshedpur. The sending off of Pal allowed Rafique Ali Sardar to come on and make his professional debut for the club. During the second half, with both teams playing with eight players each, Jamshedpur gave up four goals while scoring once at the end. Coro, Manvir Singh, and Hugo Boumous scored for Goa while Ashim Biswas found the consolation for Jamshedpur as they lost 5–1.

A few days later it was announced that Belfort, Edathodika, and Pal would be given an additional two match ban to what they were already banned for from their red cards.

2 April 2018 First round	Minerva Punjab	2–2 (4–5 p)	Jamshedpur	Bhubaneswar
		Report		Stadium: Kalinga Stadium; Attendance: 3,256; Referee: Santosh Trophy
	Penalties
	Opoku (penalty scored); Dano (penalty scored); Khan (penalty missed); A. Singh (penalty scored); K. Singh (penalty scored); Chemjong (penalty missed); Gagandeep (penalty missed)		(penalty scored) Belfort; (penalty scored) Priori; (penalty missed) Memo; (penalty scored) Bikey; (penalty scored) Passi; (penalty missed) Jairu; (penalty scored) Hossain

12 April 2018 Quarter-finals	Jamshedpur	1–5	Goa	Bhubaneswar
	Biswas 90+1'	Report	Fernandes 34'; Coro 69' (pen.); Singh 77'; Boumous 79', 89'	Stadium: Kalinga Stadium; Attendance: 1,200; Referee: Venkatesh R

== Player statistics ==
No.	Pos.	Name	ISL		Super Cup		Total		Discipline	
No.	Pos.	Name	Apps	Goals	Apps	Goals	Apps	Goals	A yellow rectangular card	A red rectangular card
1	GK	(India) Subrata Pal	18	0	1	0	19	0	2	2
2	DF	(Cameroon) André Bikey	13 (2)	0	2	0	17	0	3	1
4	DF	(Spain) Tiri	18	1	0	0	18	1	3	0
5	DF	(India) Shouvik Ghosh	9 (1)	0	0	0	10	0	0	0
6	MF	(Brazil) Wellington Priori	9	3	2	0	11	3	3	0
7	MF	(South Africa) Sameehg Doutie	2 (5)	0	0	0	7	0	2	0
8	MF	(Brazil) Matheus Gonçalves	11 (4)	4	2	0	17	4	2	0
9	FW	(Haiti) Kervens Belfort	5 (9)	0	2	0	16	0	0	1
10	FW	(India) Jerry Mawihmingthanga	16	1	1	0	17	1	1	0
12	FW	(India) Ashim Biswas	3 (4)	1	0 (1)	1	8	2	0	0
13	DF	(India) Sairuat Kima	0	0	1	0	1	0	0	0
14	MF	(India) Mehtab Hossain	8 (4)	0	0	0	12	0	5	1
15	DF	(India) Anas Edathodika	6 (2)	0	2	0	10	0	1	1
16	DF	(India) Robin Gurung	0	0	2	0	2	0	0	0
17	FW	(India) Farukh Choudhary	6 (9)	0	1 (1)	0	17	0	2	0
18	FW	(India) Sumeet Passi	2	0	0 (1)	0	3	0	0	0
19	MF	(India) Siddharth Singh	3 (2)	0	0	0	5	0	0	0
21	MF	(India) Bikash Jairu	10 (4)	1	1	0	15	1	0	0
22	MF	(Brazil) Memo	18	0	2	0	20	0	4	0
23	DF	(India) Souvik Chakrabarti	18	0	0	0	18	0	3	0
24	GK	(India) Rafique Ali Sardar	0	0	0 (1)	0	1	0	0	0
25	FW	(Nigeria) Izu Azuka	14 (3)	3	0	0	17	3	3	0
26	DF	(India) Yumnam Raju	9 (1)	1	2	0	12	1	1	0
27	DF	(India) Karan Amin	0	0	0 (1)	0	1	0	0	0
33	GK	(India) Sanjiban Ghosh	0 (1)	0	1	0	2	0	0	0
Left Club Midseason
11	FW	(Senegal) Talla N'Diaye	0	0	0	0	0	0	0	0

=== Goalscorers ===
As of 12 April 2018

Rank	Position	Name	Indian Super League	Super Cup	Total
1	MF	(Brazil) Matheus Gonçalves	4	0	4
2	FW	(Nigeria) Izu Azuka	3	0	3
2	MF	(Brazil) Wellington Priori	3	0	3
4	FW	(India) Ashim Biswas	1	1	2
5	FW	(India) Jerry Mawihmingthanga	1	0	1
5	DF	(Spain) Tiri	1	0	1
5	FW	(India) Yumnam Raju	1	0	1
5	MF	(India) Bikash Jairu	1	0	1

=== Clean sheets ===
As of 12 April 2018

Rank	Name	Indian Super League	Super Cup	Total
1	(India) Subrata Pal	7	0	7
2	(India) Sanjiban Ghosh	0	1	1

== See also ==
- 2017–18 in Indian football
