= Sanjiban Ghosh =

Indian footballer (born 1991)

Personal information
- Date of birth: 6 July 1991 (age 35)
- Place of birth: Andul, West Bengal, India
- Height: 1.88 m (6 ft 2 in)
- Position: Goalkeeper

Team information
- Current team: Thrissur Magic

Youth career
- Southern Samity

Senior career*
Years	Team	Apps	(Gls)
2011–2016	Mumbai	6	(0)
2015	→ Delhi Dynamos (loan)	3	(0)
2016	→ Delhi Dynamos (loan)	0	(0)
2017–2018	Jamshedpur	2	(0)
2018–2020	Chennaiyin	3	(0)
2020–2022	NorthEast United	0	(0)
2022–2023	Real Kashmir	2	(0)
2023–2024	Bhawanipore		
2024	Sudeva Delhi	1	(0)
2024–	Thrissur Magic		
- * Club domestic league appearances and goals as of 27 April 2024

Sanjiban Ghosh (Bengali: সঞ্জীবন ঘোষ; born 6 July 1991) is an Indian professional footballer who plays as a goalkeeper for Thrissur Magic.

== Career ==
Born in Andul, West Bengal, Ghosh began his career with Southern Samity before going on trial with Mumbai. He was soon signed by the club. He made his professional debut for the club on 6 October 2012 in the opening game of the season against Pailan Arrows. He started and played the whole match as Mumbai lost 3–2.

=== Delhi Dynamos (loans) ===
On 4 October 2015, following injuries to Subhasish Roy Chowdhury and Ravi Kumar, Ghosh, along with Ishan Debnath, was signed by Delhi Dynamos of the Indian Super League on emergency loan. Ghosh made his debut for Delhi Dynamos that same day in their opening match of the season against Goa. He conceded twice as Delhi Dynamos lost 2–0.

On 23 May 2016, Ghosh was retained by Delhi Dynamos for the 2016 ISL season.

=== Jamshedpur ===
On 23 July 2017, Ghosh was selected in the 10th round of the 2017–18 ISL Players Draft by Jamshedpur for the 2017–18 Indian Super League. He made his debut for the club on 4 March 2018 in their final match of the season against Goa. He came on as a 9th-minute substitute for Bikash Jairu after the starting goalkeeper, Subrata Pal, was sent off. He would go on to concede three goals as Goa won 3–0.

Ghosh then earned the Hero of the Match award after he helped Jamshedpur secure a victory via penalties in their Super Cup first round match against Minerva Punjab. He started the match and also saved two close range shots during second half of extra time to help maintain the 0–0 scoreline. During penalties, saved three shots as Jamshedpur won 5–4.

=== NorthEast United ===
In 2020, Ghosh was signed by NorthEast United FC on a two-year deal.

=== Real Kashmir ===
In September 2022, Ghosh signed for I-League club Real Kashmir, on a one-year deal.

== International ==
In October 2015, Ghosh was called up to the India squad.

== Career statistics ==
=== Club ===
As of 6 December 2018

Club	Season	League			Cup		AFC		Total	
Club	Season	Division	Apps	Goals	Apps	Goals	Apps	Goals	Apps	Goals
Mumbai	2012–13	I-League	1	0	0	0	—		1	0
Mumbai	2013–14	I-League	0	0	0	0	—		0	0
Mumbai	2014–15	I-League	4	0	0	0	—		4	0
Mumbai	2015–16	I-League	1	0	0	0	—		1	0
Mumbai	Mumbai total		6	0	0	0	0	0	6	0
Delhi Dynamos (loan)	2015	Indian Super League	3	0	0	0	—		3	0
Delhi Dynamos (loan)	2016	Indian Super League	0	0	0	0	—		0	0
Delhi Dynamos (loan)	Delhi Dynamos total		3	0	0	0	0	0	3	0
Jamshedpur	2017–18	Indian Super League	1	0	1 (Note: Appearance(s) in Super Cup)	0	—		2	0
Chennaiyin	2018–19	Indian Super League	3	0	0	0	—		3	0
Chennaiyin	2019–20	Indian Super League	0	0	0	0	—		0	0
Chennaiyin	Chennaiyin total		3	0	0	0	0	0	3	0
NorthEast United	2020–21	Indian Super League	0	0	0	0	—		0	0
NorthEast United	2021–22	Indian Super League	0	0	0	0	—		0	0
NorthEast United	NorthEast United total		0	0	0	0	0	0	0	0
Real Kashmir	2022–23	I-League	0	0	0	0	—		0	0
Career total			13	0	1	0	0	0	14	0
