= Mukhi (surname) =

Mukhi (Hindi: मुखी) is a surname. Notable people with the surname include:

- Anjali Mukhi, Indian television actress
- Gourav Mukhi (born 1998), Indian professional footballer
- Jagdish Mukhi (born 1942), Indian politician
- Meet Mukhi, Indian film and television child actor
