= Ashim Biswas (footballer) =

Indian footballer (born 1982)

Personal information
- Full name: Ashim Biswas
- Date of birth: 14 July 1982 (age 44)
- Place of birth: Ashoknagar, West Bengal, India
- Height: 1.70 m (5 ft 7 in)
- Position: Forward

Team information
- Current team: Sundarban Bengal Auto FC (advisor)

Senior career*
Years	Team	Apps	(Gls)
2001–2003	Tollygunge Agragami		(19)
2003–2005	Mohun Bagan		(14)
2005–2006	Salgaocar	15	(1)
2006–2009	East Bengal	63	(19)
2009–2010	Chirag United		(4)
2010–2012	Mohun Bagan		(5)
2012–2014	Mohammedan		(6)
2015–2016	Tollygunge Agragami		(8)
2016–2017	Southern Samity		(4)
2017–2018	Jamshedpur	7	(1)
2018	Tollygunge Agragami	10	(2)
2022–2023	Diamond Harbour		

International career
2003–2004	India	10	(4)
- * Club domestic league appearances and goals

Ashim Biswas (Bengali: অসীম বিশ্বাস; born 14 July 1982) is an Indian former professional footballer who played as a forward.

== Club career ==
=== East Bengal ===
He had scored with a header against Mohammedan from a Syed Rahim Nabi cross and then Ashim's cross was netted in by Edmilson Marques Pardal in the pre-quarterfinal of the 29th Federation Cup in 2007 at Guru Nanak Stadium in Ludhiana, match which East Bengal won 3–1. In Calcutta Premier Division 2008, he had scored 2–0 against Mohammedan. He had scored the only goal in the 1–0 win over Prayag United. He is currently playing for Diamond Harbour FC in Calcutta premier A division.

=== Jamshedpur ===
On 23 July 2017, Ghosh was selected in the 14th round of the 2017–18 ISL Players Draft by Kerala for the 2017–18 Indian Super League. He made his debut for the club on 10 December 2017 against Pune City. He came on as a 66th-minute substitute for Siddharth Singh as Jamshedpur lost 1–0. He then scored his first goal for the club on 17 January 2018 in their match against the Kerala Blasters. He found the net in the 31st minute as Jamshedpur won 2–1.

On 12 April 2018, in Jamshedpur's quarter-final match during the Super Cup, Biswas scored the consolation for the club in a 5–1 defeat to Goa.

== Statistics ==
=== International ===
National team	Year	Apps	Goals
India	2003	6	4
India	2004	4	0
India	Total	10	4

== Honours ==
India

- SAFF Championship third place: 2003
- Afro-Asian Games silver medal: 2003

Individual

- IndianFootball.com 'player of the Year' & 'rookie of the year' award: 2003 (with Tollygunge Agragami)
