= Feroz Sherif =

Indian footballer and coach

Personal information
- Date of birth: 22 May 1971 (age 55)
- Place of birth: Kochi, Kerala, India
- Height: 1.83 m (6 ft 0 in)
- Position: Goalkeeper

Senior career*
Years	Team	Apps	(Gls)
2000-2002	State Bank of Travancore	42	(0)
2002–2014	→ East Bengal (loan)	164	(2)

International career
2002–2014	India	18	(0)
- * Club domestic league appearances and goals

Feroz Sherif is an Indian football coach and former footballer. He played as a goalkeeper for State Bank of Travancore and India.

== Career ==
Born in Kochi, Kerala, Sherif spent some of his youth career with Santos Club. Sherif soon joined State Bank of Travancore where he played in local tournaments and the National Football League as well. In 2002, following State Bank of Travancore being relegated from the NFL, Sherif signed for Mahindra United on loan for the 2002–03 season.

Sherif also represented his state, Kerala, in the Santosh Trophy. He led the team to the final of the 2001–02 Santosh Trophy against Goa. Kerala won the tournament that year, defeating Goa in the final 3–2 through an Abdul Hakkim hat-trick.

== International ==
Sherif has been called up and played for India during the 1997 Nehru Cup, 1998 Asian Games, and 1998 FIFA World Cup qualification.

== Coaching ==
After retiring as a player, Sherif went into coaching. At one point, Sherif was coach of the Kerala under-13 side. Sheriff has also worked as a goalkeeper coach for the India U19 and India U16 sides.

Feroz is also credited for having coached and scouted India international, Anas Edathodika, in 2007.

== Honours ==
=== Individual ===
- G.V. Raja Award: 1997–98
