= Yumnam Raju =

Indian footballer (born 1989)

Personal information
- Full name: Yumnam Raju Mangang
- Date of birth: 3 July 1989 (age 37)
- Place of birth: Manipur, India
- Height: 1.70 m (5 ft 7 in)
- Position: Defender

Team information
- Current team: Delhi FC
- Number: 14

Senior career*
Years	Team	Apps	(Gls)
2011–2014	Churchill Brothers		
2014–2015	Pune	13	(1)
2015	NorthEast United	10	(0)
2016	Pune City	2	(0)
2017	Chennai City	9	(0)
2017–2019	Jamshedpur	14	(1)
2021–	Delhi FC		
- * Club domestic league appearances and goals

Yumnam Raju Mangang (born 3 July 1989) is an Indian football manager and former professional footballer who manages NEROCA FC.
