= Izu Azuka =

Nigerian footballer (born 1989)

Personal information
- Full name: Izu Bobo Azuka
- Date of birth: 24 May 1989 (age 37)
- Place of birth: Port Harcourt, Rivers State, Nigeria
- Height: 1.83 m (6 ft 0 in)
- Position: Forward

Senior career*
Years	Team	Apps	(Gls)
–2008	Sharks	–	(–)
2008–2010	JS Kabylie	32	(22)
2011	Al-Ittihad Tripoli	–	(–)
2011–2012	Sunshine Stars	–	(–)
2013	Espérance	0	(0)
2013	→ Hammam-Lif (loan)	6	(4)
2013–2014	Kahramanmaraşspor	27	(12)
2014	Gaziantep BB	15	(9)
2015	Irtysh Pavlodar	17	(7)
2015	Taraz	8	(3)
2016	Yeni Malatyaspor	9	(0)
2017	Akzhayik	17	(5)
2017	Mağusa Türk Gücü	2	(0)
2017–2018	Jamshedpur	17	(3)
2018–2019	Fasil Kenema S.C.	24	(11)

International career
2011	Nigeria U-23	4	(2)
2012–	Nigeria	3	(0)
- * Club domestic league appearances and goals

Izu Azuka (born 24 May 1989) is a Nigerian former football player.

== Club career ==
On 26 November 2008, Azuka signed a two-year contract with Algerian club JS Kabylie after playing with Nigerian side Sharks F.C. In December 2010, his contract was not renewed as he made just 4 league appearances in the 2010–11 season.

On 2 January 2011, Azuka joined Libyan side Al-Ittihad Tripoli on a free transfer from JS Kabylie.

He then signed for Sunshine Stars F.C. of Akure in December 2011, a squad which eliminated Ittihad in the 2011 CAF Confederation Cup.

On 7 September 2012, Tunisian club Espérance de Tunis announced that they had reached a deal with Sunshine Stars for Azuka. He joined the club in December when the transfer window opens and signed a three-and-a-half-year contract.

In February 2015, Azuka joined Kazakhstan Premier League side FC Irtysh Pavlodar on a one-year contract. Moving to fellow Kazakhstan Premier League side FC Taraz July of the same year.

Azuka joined Turkish side Yeni Malatyaspor at 4 January 2016.

== International career ==
He was called up by Olympic coach Augustine Eguavoen for the June 2011 qualifier against Tanzania.

== Career statistics ==
=== Club ===
As of match played 6 December 2017

Appearances and goals by club, season and competition
Club	Season	League			National Cup		League Cup		Continental		Other		Total	
Club	Season	Division	Apps	Goals	Apps	Goals	Apps	Goals	Apps	Goals	Apps	Goals	Apps	Goals
CS Hammam-Lif	2012–13	CLP-1	6	0	0	0	–		–		–		6	0
Kahramanmaraşspor	2013–14	TFF First League	13	5	2	0	–		–		–		15	5
Gaziantep BB	2013–14	TFF First League	15	4	0	0	–		–		–		15	4
Irtysh Pavlodar	2015	Kazakhstan Premier League	18	3	1	0	–		–		–		18	3
Taraz	2015	Kazakhstan Premier League	8	1	0	0	–		–		–		8	1
Yeni Malatyaspor	2015–16	TFF First League	9	0	0	0	–		–		–		9	0
Akzhayik	2017	Kazakhstan Premier League	17	5	0	0	–		–		0	0	17	5
Mağusa Türk Gücü	2017–18	KTFF Süper Lig	2	0	0	0	–		–		–		2	0
Jamshedpur	2017–18	Indian Super League	17	3	–		–		–		–		17	3
Career total			107	21	3	0	-	-	-	-	0	0	107	21
