= Rafique Ali Sardar =

Indian footballer (born 1998)

Personal information
- Full name: Mohammad Rafique Ali Sardar
- Date of birth: 16 April 1998 (age 28)
- Place of birth: Kolkata, West Bengal, India
- Height: 1.85 m (6 ft 1 in)
- Position: Goalkeeper

Team information
- Current team: Forca Kochi

Youth career
- TFA

Senior career*
Years	Team	Apps	(Gls)
2017–2020	Jamshedpur	4	(0)
2020–2021	East Bengal	0	(0)
2021	→ Mohammedan (loan)	2	(0)
2022	Mohammedan	0	(0)
2022–2023	Rajasthan United	13	(0)
2023–2024	TRAU		
2024–2025	Aizawl		
2025–	Forca Kochi		
- * Club domestic league appearances and goals as of 20:52, 2 February 2023 (UTC)

Mohammad Rafique Ali Sardar (born 16 April 1998) is an Indian professional footballer who plays as a goalkeeper for the Super League Kerala club Forca Kochi.

== Career ==
Born in Kolkata, West Bengal, Sardar rose from poverty to joining the youth academies of the two Kolkata giants East Bengal and Mohun Bagan. He soon then moved to the Tata Football Academy.

=== Jamshedpur FC ===
Before the 2017–18 season, Sardar was announced as part of the inaugural Jamshedpur squad for the Indian Super League. He made his professional debut for the club on 12 April 2018 in the Super Cup against Goa. He came on as a halftime substitute for Sairuat Kima after their #1 goalkeeper, Subrata Pal, was sent off. Jamshedpur went on to lose 1–5. A week later, on 20 April 2018, it was announced that Sardar signed a new contract with Jamshedpur, keeping him at the club till 2020.

=== East Bengal FC ===
A couple of years later, Sardar for East Bengal FC, on 18 April 2020.

=== Mohammedan SC ===
The head coach of Mohammedan SC(Kolkata), Jose Hevia, signed Rafique Ali Sardar from SC East Bengal in 2020 after being released by Robbie Fowler the head coach of SC East Bengal.

== Career statistics ==
=== Club ===
As of 2 February 2023

Club	Season	League			Cup		AFC		Total	
Club	Season	Division	Apps	Goals	Apps	Goals	Apps	Goals	Apps	Goals
Jamshedpur	2018–19	Indian Super League	1	0	1 (Note: Appearance(s) in Super Cup)	0	—		2	0
Jamshedpur	2019–20	Indian Super League	3	0	1	0	—		4	0
Jamshedpur	Jamshedpur total		4	0	2	0	0	0	6	0
East Bengal	2020–21	Indian Super League	0	0	0	0	—		0	0
Mohammedan (loan)	2020–21	I-League	2	0	0	0	—		2	0
Mohammedan	2022–23	I-League	0	0	0	0	—		0	0
Rajasthan United	2022–23	I-League	13	0	0	0	—		13	0
Career total			19	0	2	0	0	0	21	0

== Honours ==
Rajasthan United

- Baji Rout Cup: 2022
