= Pablo Morgado =

Spanish footballer

Personal information
- Full name: Pablo Morgado Blanco
- Date of birth: 31 May 1989 (age 37)
- Place of birth: Valencia, Spain
- Height: 1.75 m (5 ft 9 in)
- Position: Winger

Team information
- Current team: Benidorm

Youth career
- Valencia

Senior career*
Years	Team	Apps	(Gls)
2009–2011	Valencia B	20	(0)
2009–2010	→ La Nucía (loan)		
2010	→ Mirandés (loan)	11	(1)
2010–2011	Mirandés	7	(1)
2011–2014	Huracán	88	(9)
2014–2015	Hospitalet	28	(3)
2015–2016	Badalona	34	(3)
2016	Mérida	1	(0)
2016–2017	Jumilla	30	(1)
2017–2018	La Nucía	38	(12)
2018–2019	Jamshedpur	13	(4)
2019–2021	La Nucía	44	(3)
2021–2022	Acero	35	(4)
2022–2023	Gandía	27	(5)
2023–	Benidorm	3	(0)
- * Club domestic league appearances and goals as of 13 October 2024

Pablo Morgado Blanco (born 31 May 1989) is a Spanish professional footballer who plays for Benidorm as a forward.

== Club career ==
Born in Valencia, Morgado graduated from the youth academy of Valencia CF and made his senior debut with the reserve team in the 2008–09 season, in the Segunda División B. Following a loan deal with CF La Nucía, he joined CD Mirandés on a temporary basis on 1 February 2010 for the remainder of the 2009–10 season.

On 22 July 2011, Morgado signed for Huracán Valencia CF. On 28 August, he scored his first goal for the club in a 1–0 victory over RCD Mallorca B.

On 8 July 2014, Morgado joined CE L'Hospitalet. He played regularly for the club, contributing with three goals in 31 matches. On 27 July 2015, he switched to CF Badalona in the same tier. He signed for Mérida AD on 14 July 2016. However, after deemed surplus to their requirements, he switched to FC Jumilla on 31 August 2016.

After a stint with former club La Nucía in the fourth tier, Morgado moved abroad for the first time in his career and joined Indian Super League club Jamshedpur FC on 10 August 2018. On 2 October, he made his debut, scoring in the dying minutes of a 2–0 victory against Mumbai City FC.

== Club statistics ==
As of match played on 2 October 2018

Club	Season	League			Cup		Other		Total	
Club	Season	Division	Apps	Goals	Apps	Goals	Apps	Goals	Apps	Goals
Valencia B	2008–09	Segunda División B	14	0	—		—		14	0
Valencia B	2009–10	Segunda División B	6	0	—		—		6	0
Valencia B	Total		20	0	—		—		20	0
Mirandés (loan)	2009–10	Segunda División B	11	1	0	0	—		11	1
Mirandés	2010–11	Segunda División B	7	1	0	0	—		7	1
Huracán	2011–12	Segunda División B	32	6	0	0	2 (Note: Appearances in Promotion Play-offs)	0	34	6
Huracán	2012–13	Segunda División B	31	1	2	0	6	0	39	1
Huracán	2013–14	Segunda División B	25	2	0	0	—		25	2
Huracán	Total		88	9	2	0	8	0	98	9
Hospitalet	2014–15	Segunda División B	28	3	3	0	—		31	3
Badalona	2015–16	Segunda División B	34	3	0	0	—		34	3
Mérida	2016–17	Segunda División B	1	0	0	0	—		1	0
Jumilla	2016–17	Segunda División B	30	1	0	0	—		30	1
La Nucía	2017–18	Tercera División	38	12	0	0	2	2	40	14
Jamshedpur	2018–19	Indian Super League	1	1	0	0	—		1	1
Career total			258	31	5	0	10	2	273	33
