= Football manager =

Football manager may refer to:

- Manager (association football) in association football, responsible for running a football club or a national team
- Football Manager (1982 series), a series of football management simulation games
- Football Manager, a series of football management simulation games started in 2005
  - The online game of the above, Football Manager Live
