= Carlos Calvo (footballer, born 1985) =

Spanish professional footballer

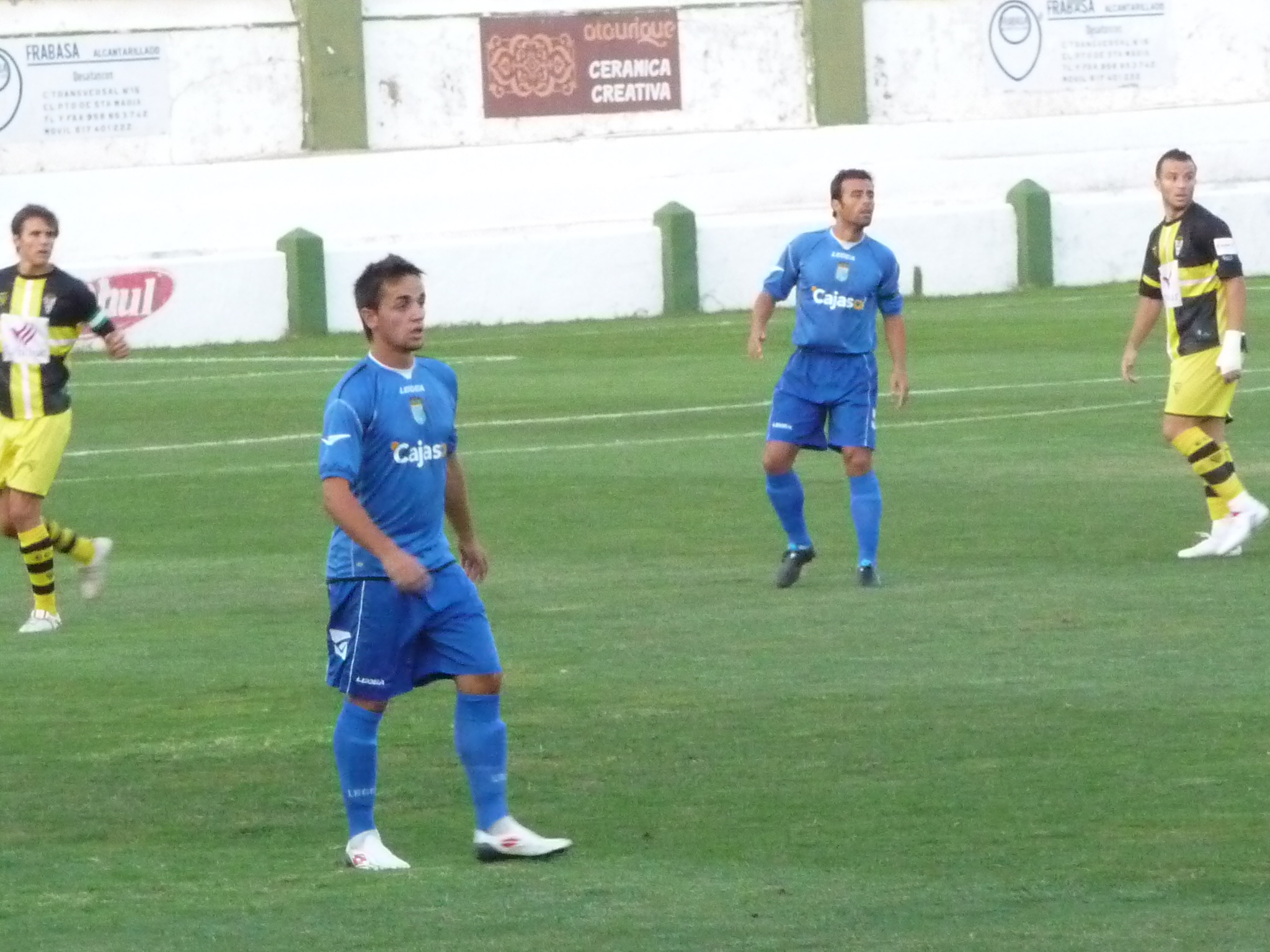
- Calvo (left) in action for Xerez in 2009

Personal information
- Full name: Carlos Calvo Sobrado
- Date of birth: 18 September 1985 (age 41)
- Place of birth: Madrid, Spain
- Height: 1.74 m (5 ft 9 in)
- Position: Winger

Youth career
- Atlético Madrid

Senior career*
Years	Team	Apps	(Gls)
2004–2005	Elche B		
2005	Valladolid B	2	(0)
2006	Villajoyosa	18	(2)
2006–2007	Alcoyano	33	(5)
2007–2010	Xerez	111	(8)
2010–2012	Udinese	0	(0)
2010–2011	→ Granada (loan)	37	(3)
2011–2012	→ Hércules (loan)	42	(8)
2012–2013	Almería	36	(2)
2013–2015	Skoda Xanthi	29	(4)
2015–2016	Huesca	4	(0)
2016–2017	Cádiz	13	(1)
2017	→ Badalona (loan)	7	(0)
2017–2018	Recreativo	13	(1)
2018–2019	Jamshedpur	15	(4)
2020	Sliema Wanderers	2	(0)
2020–2021	Xerez	22	(3)
2021	Jerez Industrial	3	(0)
Total		384	(41)
- * Club domestic league appearances and goals

Carlos Calvo Sobrado (born 18 September 1985) is a Spanish former professional footballer who played mainly as a winger but also as a forward.

== Club career ==
Calvo was born in Madrid. After playing until the age of 22 with modest sides – Elche CF Ilicitano, Real Valladolid Promesas, Villajoyosa CF and CD Alcoyano – he had his first taste of professional football in the 2007–08 season, with Segunda División club Xerez CD. On 13 June 2009, he became an integral part of the Andalusians' history as he scored the 2–1 winner against SD Huesca which certified their first-ever promotion to La Liga.

On 31 January 2010, as Xerez ranked last in the league, Calvo netted twice to help his team to come from behind against RCD Mallorca at home, in just the second win in 20 games. After being relegated, he signed a three-year contract with Udinese Calcio of the Serie A; on 13 July, however, he was transferred to Granada CF of the Spanish second division.

Calvo started in 15 of the league matches he appeared in his only season and scored three times, as the club achieved a second consecutive promotion. Still owned by the Italians, he spent the following campaign also in division two, with Hércules CF.

After his contract with Udinese expired, Calvo joined UD Almería on 31 August 2012. He played the following years in the Super League Greece, with Skoda Xanthi FC.

On 25 August 2015, Calvo returned to Spain after agreeing to a one-year deal with SD Huesca, newly promoted to the second tier. After representing in quick succession Cádiz CF, CF Badalona and Recreativo de Huelva, he moved to Indian Super League franchise Jamshedpur FC on 10 August 2018.

In August 2020, following a very brief spell in Malta with Sliema Wanderers FC, the 35-year-old Calvo returned to Xerez, now in the Tercera División.
