= Talla N'Diaye =

Senegalese footballer

Personal information
- Date of birth: 20 January 1993 (age 33)
- Place of birth: M'Bour, Senegal
- Height: 1.79 m (5 ft 10 in)
- Position: Forward

Team information
- Current team: Tala'ea El Gaish
- Number: 29

Senior career*
Years	Team	Apps	(Gls)
2010–2011	Vendée Fontenay	26	(4)
2015–2016	Challans	0	(0)
2016–2017	Safa	20	(5)
2017	Al-Ansar	5	(0)
2017–	Tala'ea El Gaish	30	(10)
- * Club domestic league appearances and goals as of 13:28, 1 October 2020 (UTC)

Talla N'Diaye (born 20 January 1993) is a Senegalese professional footballer who plays as a forward for Rachad bernoussi.

== Honours ==
Individual

- Lebanese Premier League top assist provider: 2016–17
