= Gourav Mukhi =

Indian footballer (born 1998)

Personal information
- Date of birth: 20 March 1998 (age 28)
- Place of birth: Jamshedpur, Jharkhand, India
- Position: Forward

Senior career*
Years	Team	Apps	(Gls)
2017–2018	Jamshedpur B	10	(6)
2018–2020	Jamshedpur	4	(1)
2020–2021	Mohammedan	4	(0)
2022–	BSS Sporting		
- * Club domestic league appearances and goals as of 8 January 2020 ‡ National team caps and goals as of 8 January 2020

Gourav Mukhi (born 20 March 1998) is an Indian professional footballer who plays as a forward.

== Club career ==
Mukhi was raised in Harijan Basti, Dhatkidih in Jamshedpur, Jharkhand and is the son of Chhotelal Mukhi, a former local amateur footballer. In June 2015, after representing Jharkhand in the Sub Juniors U15 Championship, Mukhi, along with four other players and his head coach, were suspended for submitting forged birth certificates and playing while overaged.

Mukhi eventually joined Tata Steel in the local Jharkhand Football League and then joined the Jamshedpur FC B team. After performing well for the reserves in the I-League 2nd Division, Mukhi was signed for the first-team Jamshedpur side for the Indian Super League. He made his professional debut for the club on 7 October 2018 against Bengaluru. Mukhi came on as a 71st-minute substitute for Jerry Mawihmingthanga and scored the equalizing goal for club ten minutes later to make it 1–1. The game soon ended 2–2 and Mukhi earned the ISL Emerging Player of the Match award.

On 20 November 2018, Mukhi was suspended by the AIFF for six months after admitting to age fraud. In 2018, Mukhi claimed to be 16 years old but was revealed to be 21 years old after supposedly becoming the youngest player in ISL history. He was cleared to play by the AIFF on 9 September 2019, after serving the suspension and providing correct age documents.

In January 2021, Mohammedan SC roped in the former Jamshedpur FC forward for the 2020–21 I-League season.

== Career statistics ==
As of 8 January 2020

Club	Season	League			Cup		Continental		Total	
Club	Season	Division	Apps	Goals	Apps	Goals	Apps	Goals	Apps	Goals
Jamshedpur B	2017–18	I-League 2nd Division	10	6	0	0	—	—	10	6
Jamshedpur	2018–19	ISL	4	1	0	0	—	—	3	1
Career total			13	7	0	0	0	0	13	7
