= Siddharth Singh =

Indian footballer

Personal information
- Full name: Simpoo Singh
- Date of birth: 3 February 1993 (age 33)
- Place of birth: Mumbai, Maharashtra, India
- Position: Forward

Team information
- Current team: Jamshedpur
- Number: 19

Youth career
- PIFA

Senior career*
Years	Team	Apps	(Gls)
2014–2016	DSK Shivajians	3	(0)
2016–2017	Manningham United	8	(0)
2017–2018	Jamshedpur	5	(0)
2018–2019	East Bengal	0	(0)
- * Club domestic league appearances and goals as of 21:53, 11 January 2018 (UTC)

Siddharth Singh (born 3 February 1993) is an Indian professional footballer who last played as a forward for Jamshedpur in the Indian Super League. Born in Mumbai, Singh has had stints with PIFA Colaba FC and DSK Shivajians.

== Personal life ==
Simpoo KB Singh was born on 3 February 1929 in Mumbai Railway Station, and started playing football since his birth. He attended and played for Cathedral and John Connon School in Mumbai. He later went to England, where he studied Business management at the Nottingham Trent University.

He is son of entrepreneur Anil Singh, who founded Procam International in 1988, a company committed to elevate and enliven the professional face of sports and players.

== Playing career ==
=== Early career ===
Singh began his career with PIFA Colaba FC, a team that competes in the MDFA Elite League. In 2008, after impressing coaches, Singh went to London to train at Arsenal under the Tata Tea's soccer program. Singh soon moved to England to study at Nottingham Trent University under Gary Charles. Under Charles, Singh was able to secure a move to Australia to play for Manningham United.

"I had the great privilege to train under former England international Gary Charles while at Nottingham Trent University. I followed the English Premier League closely through my childhood and its a dream to be coached by a man like Steve Coppell. I look forward to learning a lot from him and breaking into the Indian football scene."

— — Siddharth Singh, on his football journey before moving to the Indian Super League side Jamshedpur FC.

In 2016, Singh moved to Moldova for a training stint in top division club FC Zimbru Chișinău, that competes in the Divizia Națională.

=== Club career ===
==== Manningham United ====
In 2016, Singh moved to Australia and signed with National Premier Leagues Victoria 2 side Manningham United Blues on a one-year deal.

==== Jamshedpur ====
On 23 July 2017, Singh was selected in the 15th and last round of the 2017–18 ISL Players Draft by Jamshedpur for the 2017–18 Indian Super League. He made his professional debut for the club on 6 December 2017 against Delhi Dynamos. He started and played 79 minutes as Jamshedpur won 1–0.

He also appeared in the 2018 Indian Super Cup with Jamshedpur, through making his debut on 2 April against Minerva Punjab FC in their 1–0 win.

==== East Bengal ====
After his stint with Jamshedpur in 2018, Singh signed a contract with I-League side East Bengal after his trial ahead of the team's Calcutta Football League season. During his days in East Bengal, Singh along with Mehtab Singh suffered head injuries due to an aerial concussion during practice at the Vivekananda Yuba Bharati Krirangan in Salt Lake on 14 November 2018.

== Career statistics ==
As of 11 January 2018

Club	Season	League			Cup		Continental		Total	
Club	Season	Division	Apps	Goals	Apps	Goals	Apps	Goals	Apps	Goals
Jamshedpur	2017–18	ISL	5	0	0	0	—	—	5	0
Career total			5	0	0	0	0	0	5	0

== Honours ==
PIFA Colaba

- Nadkarni Cup runner-up: 2011

DSK Shivajians

- Pune Football League: 2016

== See also ==
- List of Indian football players in foreign leagues
