= Bikash Jairu =

Indian footballer (born 1990)

Personal information
- Date of birth: 10 November 1990 (age 36)
- Place of birth: Gyalshing, Sikkim, India
- Height: 1.63 m (5 ft 4 in)
- Position: Winger

Team information
- Current team: East Bengal
- Number: 23

Youth career
- Sports Hostel in Namchi

Senior career*
| Years | Team | Apps | (Gls) |
| 2008–2011 | ONGC | | |
| 2011–2012 | Rangdajied United | | |
| 2012–2013 | Mumbai Tigers | 14 | (3) |
| 2013–2015 | Salgaocar | 28 | (6) |
| 2015–2017 | East Bengal | 15 | (5) |
| 2015 | → Pune City (loan) | 11 | (0) |
| 2016 | → ATK (loan) | 0 | (0) |
| 2017–2020 | Jamshedpur | 35 | (1) |
| 2020–2022 | East Bengal | 15 | (0) |

International career^{‡}
| 2015–2022 | India | 11 | (0) |
Medal record
Representing India
SAFF Championship
| Winner | 2015 India |
- * Club domestic league appearances and goals as of 20:44, 28 February 2022 (UTC) ‡ National team caps and goals as of 14 November 2017

Bikash Jairu (born 10 November 1990) is an Indian professional footballer who plays as a winger for Indian Super League club East Bengal and the India national team.

== Career ==
Jairu hails from Gyalshing, West Sikkim and was spotted during the "Search for more Bhaichungs" scheme launched by the Government of Sikkim and was inducted into the Sports Hostel in Namchi. Later he moved to the Sports Academy of Sikkim at Gangtok and passed out in 2008 grabbing a contract with ONGC. After his stint at ONGC, he moved to Shillong and joined Rangdajied United. After spending a season there he signed for Mumbai Tigers with whom he had a fruitful outing, scoring a number of goals for the team in the 2013 I-League 2nd Division.

=== Salgaocar ===
On 13 January 2014 it was announced that Bikash Jairu has signed for Salgaocar on loan from Mumbai Tigers. He made his debut for Salgaocar on 18 January 2014 in the Federation Cup match against Mumbai at the Nehru Stadium before being replaced by Freiman Peixoto as Salgaocar won the match 1–2.

He made his debut in the I-League on 16 February 2014 against Mohun Bagan at the Tilak Maidan Stadium in which he came on as a substitute for Clifton Dias in the 46th minute and was again replaced by Milagres Gonsalves in the 87th minute with Salgaocar winning the match 1–0.

=== East Bengal ===
On 23 June 2015 Jairu, along with Rahul Bheke (who coincidentally both played together for Mumbai Tigers in 2013) signed a season long deal with East Bengal.

=== Pune City ===
In July 2015 Jairu was drafted to play for Pune City in the Indian Super League.

=== Jamshedpur ===
On 23 July 2017, Jairu was selected in the 6th round of the player draft by Jamshedpur for the 2017–18 season. He made his debut for the club on 24 November 2017 against the Kerala Blasters. He came on as a 66th-minute substitute for Anas Edathodika as Jamshedpur drew 0–0.

On 1 February 2018, Jairu scored the winning goal for Jamshedpur in a 2–1 victory over Mumbai City at the Mumbai Football Arena. He came on as an 81st-minute substitute and then scored three minutes later.

== Career statistics ==
=== Club ===
As of 28 February 2022

| Club | Season | League | | | Cup | | Others | | AFC | | Total | |
| Club | Season | Division | Apps | Goals | Apps | Goals | Apps | Goals | Apps | Goals | Apps | Goals |
|---|---|---|---|---|---|---|---|---|---|---|---|---|
| Mumbai Tigers | 2013 | I-League 2nd Division | 14 | 3 | 0 | 0 | — | | — | | 14 | 3 |
| Salgaocar | 2013–14 | I-League | 9 | 2 | 0 | 0 | — | | — | | 9 | 2 |
| Salgaocar | 2014–15 | I-League | 19 | 4 | 0 | 0 | — | | — | | 19 | 4 |
| Salgaocar | Salgaocar total | | 28 | 6 | 0 | 0 | 0 | 0 | 0 | 0 | 28 | 6 |
| East Bengal | 2015–16 | I-League | 11 | 3 | 0 | 0 | 9 (Note: Appearance(s) in Calcutta Football League) | 1 | — | | 20 | 4 |
| East Bengal | 2016–17 | I-League | 4 | 2 | 4 (Note: Appearance(s) in Federation Cup) | 0 | 6 | 0 | — | | 14 | 2 |
| East Bengal | East Bengal total | | 15 | 5 | 4 | 0 | 15 | 1 | 0 | 0 | 34 | 6 |
| Pune City (loan) | 2015 | Indian Super League | 11 | 0 | 0 | 0 | — | | — | | 11 | 0 |
| ATK (loan) | 2016 | Indian Super League | 0 | 0 | 0 | 0 | — | | — | | 0 | 0 |
| Jamshedpur | 2017–18 | Indian Super League | 14 | 1 | 1 (Note: Appearance(s) in Super Cup) | 0 | — | | — | | 15 | 1 |
| Jamshedpur | 2018–19 | Indian Super League | 12 | 0 | 1 | 0 | — | | — | | 13 | 0 |
| Jamshedpur | 2019–20 | Indian Super League | 9 | 0 | 0 | 0 | — | | — | | 9 | 0 |
| Jamshedpur | Jamshespur total | | 35 | 1 | 2 | 0 | 0 | 0 | 0 | 0 | 37 | 1 |
| East Bengal | 2020–21 | Indian Super League | 4 | 0 | 0 | 0 | — | | — | | 4 | 0 |
| East Bengal | 2021–22 | Indian Super League | 11 | 0 | 0 | 0 | — | | — | | 11 | 0 |
| East Bengal | East Bengal total | | 15 | 0 | 0 | 0 | 0 | 0 | 0 | 0 | 15 | 0 |
| Career total | | | 118 | 15 | 6 | 0 | 15 | 1 | 0 | 0 | 139 | 16 |

=== International ===
As of matches played till 14 November 2017

| National team | Year | Apps | Goals |
|---|---|---|---|
| India | 2015 | 5 | 0 |
| India | 2016 | 3 | 0 |
| India | 2017 | 3 | 0 |
| Total | | 11 | 0 |

== Honours ==
=== Club ===
East Bengal

- Calcutta Football League (2): 2015, 2016

ATK

- Indian Super League (1): 2016

=== International ===
India

- SAFF Championship (1): 2015

=== Individual ===
- 2013 Durand Cup Top Scorer (7 goals)
