= Wellington Priori =

Brazilian footballer (born 1990)

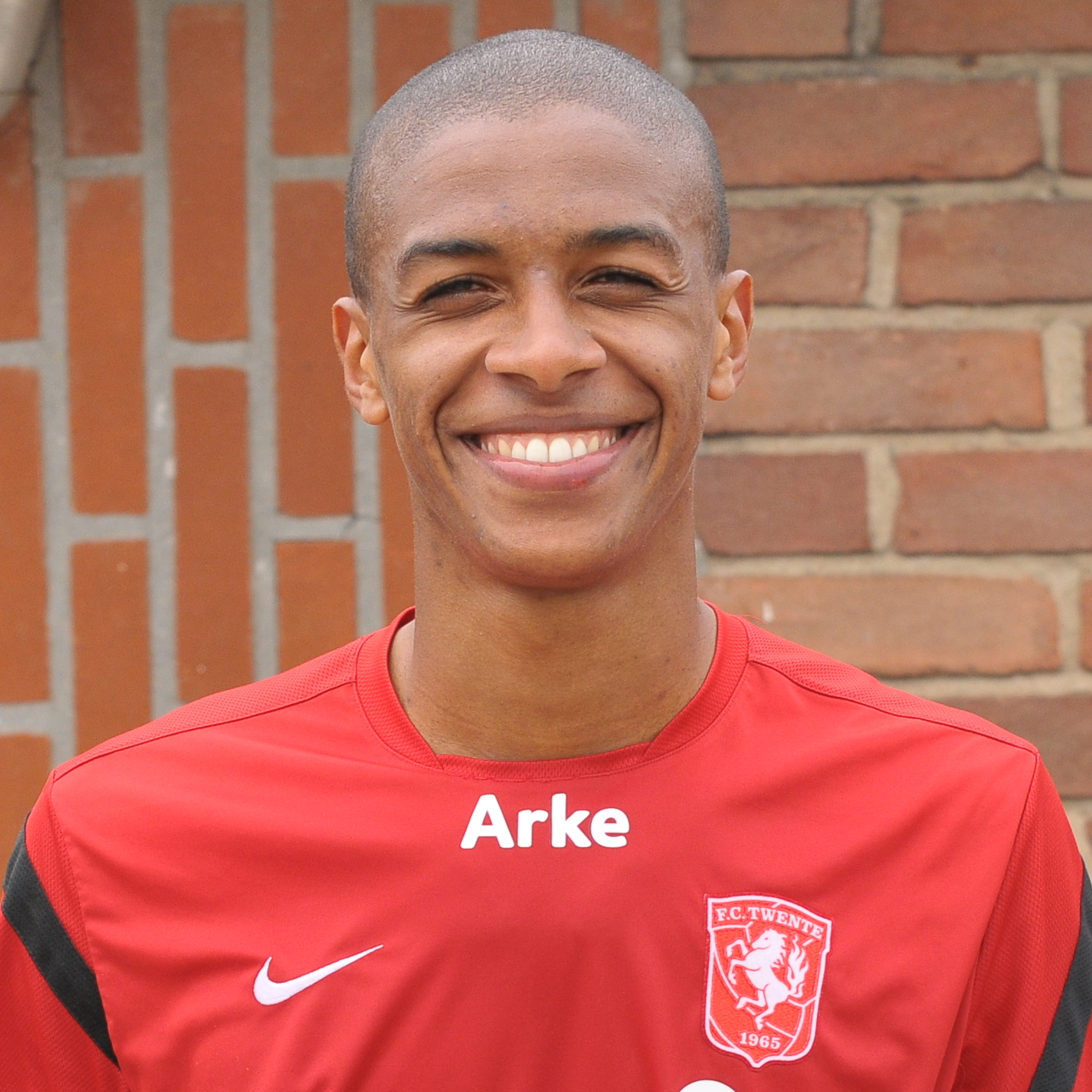
- Priori with FC Twente

Personal information
- Full name: Wellington Cirino Priori
- Date of birth: 21 February 1990 (age 36)
- Place of birth: São Paulo, Brazil
- Height: 1.90 m (6 ft 3 in)
- Position: Midfielder

Team information
- Current team: Ayutthaya United
- Number: 6

Senior career*
Years	Team	Apps	(Gls)
2010–2012	Brasil de Farroupilha		
2012–2013	São José		
2014–2015	Army United	27	(1)
2015	→ Pattaya United (loan)	19	(5)
2016	Gwangju	3	(0)
2016–2017	NorthEast United	12	(0)
2017–2018	Pattaya United	31	(3)
2018	Jamshedpur	9	(3)
2018–2019	Botafogo		
2019	Perlis	0	(0)
2019	Abahani Dhaka	1	(0)
2020	Trat	3	(0)
2021–2022	Chainat Hornbill	49	(10)
2022	Jamshedpur	6	(0)
2023	Chainat Hornbill	14	(1)
2023–2024	Police Tero	20	(0)
2024–	Ayutthaya United	31	(1)
- * Club domestic league appearances and goals as of 26 April 2025 (UTC)

Wellington Cirino Priori (born 21 February 1990) is a Brazilian professional footballer who plays as a midfielder for Ayutthaya United.

== Career ==
=== Early career ===
Born in São Paulo, Wellington started his career with Brasil de Farroupilha where he played for three years before moving to São José. In 2013, Wellington had a training stint with Dutch Eredivisie side, FC Twente. The club was interested in signing him but due to passport complications, the move to the Netherlands did not materialize. After his training stint with Twente, Wellington signed for Thai League T1 side Army United. A season later, Wellington signed with Thai Division 1 League side Pattaya United. After another season, Wellington moved to South Korea to K League Classic side Gwangju.

=== NorthEast United ===
On 3 August 2016, Priori moved to India and signed with NorthEast United of the Indian Super League.

=== Jamshedpur ===
On 9 January 2018, Priori signed with Jamshedpur of the Indian Super League.

On 29 March 2019, Priori joined Bangladesh Premier League club Dhaka Abahani.

=== Jamshedpur ===
In August 2022, Priori returned to defending Indian Super League premiers Jamshedpur. On 6 December, Priori's contract was terminated by mutual agreement with immediate effect.

== Career statistics ==
As of 21 September 2018

Appearances and goals by club, season and competition
Club	Season	League			National cup		League cup		Continental		Total	
Club	Season	Division	Apps	Goals	Apps	Goals	Apps	Goals	Apps	Goals	Apps	Goals
Army United	2014	Thai League T1	22	1	—	—	—	—	—	—	22	1
Gwangju	2016	KLC	3	0	—	—	—	—	—	—	3	0
NorthEast United	2016	Indian Super League	12	0	—	—	—	—	—	—	12	0
Jamshedpur	2017–18	Indian Super League	9	3	—	—	—	—	—	—	9	3
Career total			46	4	0	0	0	0	0	0	46	4
