= Subhasish Roy Chowdhury =

Indian footballer (born 1986)

Subhashish Roy Chowdhury
Personal information
- Full name: Subhashish Roy Chowdhury
- Date of birth: 27 September 1986 (age 40)
- Place of birth: Kolkata, West Bengal, India
- Height: 1.85 m (6 ft 1 in)
- Position: Goalkeeper

Team information
- Current team: East Bengal (Goalkeeping Coach)

Youth career
- 1996–2004: TFA

Senior career*
Years	Team	Apps	(Gls)
2004–2005	East Bengal	24	(0)
2005–2010	Mahindra United	114	(0)
2010–2014	Dempo	96	(0)
2014	Atlético de Kolkata	14	(0)
2014–2015	East Bengal	26	(0)
2015–2016	Delhi Dynamos	14	(0)
2016–2017	Goa	14	(0)
2017–2018	East Bengal	26	(0)
2018–2019	Kerala Blasters	24	(0)
2019–2020	Jamshedpur	32	(0)
2020–2022	NorthEast United	58	(0)
2022–2023	Real Kashmir	30	(0)
2023–2024	Churchill Brothers	24	(0)
2024–2025	Forca Kochi	14	(0)

International career^{‡}
2004–2006	India U20	16	(0)
2006–2008	India U23	12	(0)
2008–2012	India	16	(0)
- * Club domestic league appearances and goals ‡ National team caps and goals as of 13 March 2012

Subhashish Roy Chowdhury (Bengali: শুভাশীষ রায় চৌধুরী; born 27 September 1986) is an Indian former professional footballer who played as a goalkeeper.

== Club career ==
=== Early career ===
Born in Kolkata, West Bengal, Chowdhury started his career at the Tata Football Academy. He began his professional career at East Bengal at the National Football League. He stayed at the club for one season before joining fellow NFL side Mahindra United in 2005. While with Mahindra United, Chowdhury helped his side win the Durand Cup in 2008; beating Churchill Brothers 3–2.

=== Dempo ===
After Mahindra United disbanded in 2010 Chowdhury signed for Dempo of the I-League. While with Dempo, Chowdhury helped the Goan side win the I-League in 2011.

=== Atlético de Kolkata ===
After the 2013–14 I-League season, it was confirmed that Chowdhury was released by Dempo and that he had signed with IMG-Reliance to take part in the Indian Super League for 2014. On 23 July 2014, it was announced that Chowdhury was selected by Atlético de Kolkata in the 2014 ISL Inaugural Domestic Draft in the eleventh round. He made his debut for Atlético de Kolkata on 12 October 2014 in the team's and league's opener against Mumbai City. Chowdhury managed to keep the clean-sheet and win the ISL Emerging player of the game award as Atlético de Kolkata won the match 3–0.

=== East Bengal ===
As the tournament ended, Roy Chowdhury signed for I-League runners-up East Bengal.

=== Kerala Blasters ===
On 23 July 2017, Roy Chowdhury was selected in the seventh round of the 2017–18 ISL Players Draft by the Kerala Blasters for the 2017–18 Indian Super League. He made his debut for the club on 31 December 2017 against Bengaluru. He started the match but had to come off in the 74th minute through injury as Kerala Blasters lost 3–1.

=== Jamshedpur ===
After spending a season with the Kerala Blasters, it was announced that Chowdhury had signed with fellow ISL side Jamshedpur on 26 April 2018.

=== NorthEast United ===
In 2019, Subhasish joined NorthEast United on a free transfer until 2021. In 2021 Subhasish extends his contract with NorthEast United for the 2021–22 Indian Super League.

== Honours ==
India

- AFC Challenge Cup: 2008
- SAFF Championship: 2011; runner-up: 2008
- Nehru Cup: 2009, 2012

India U20

- South Asian Games Silver medal: 2004

Atlético de Kolkata

- Indian Super League: 2014
