= Memo (footballer) =

Brazilian footballer (born 1988)

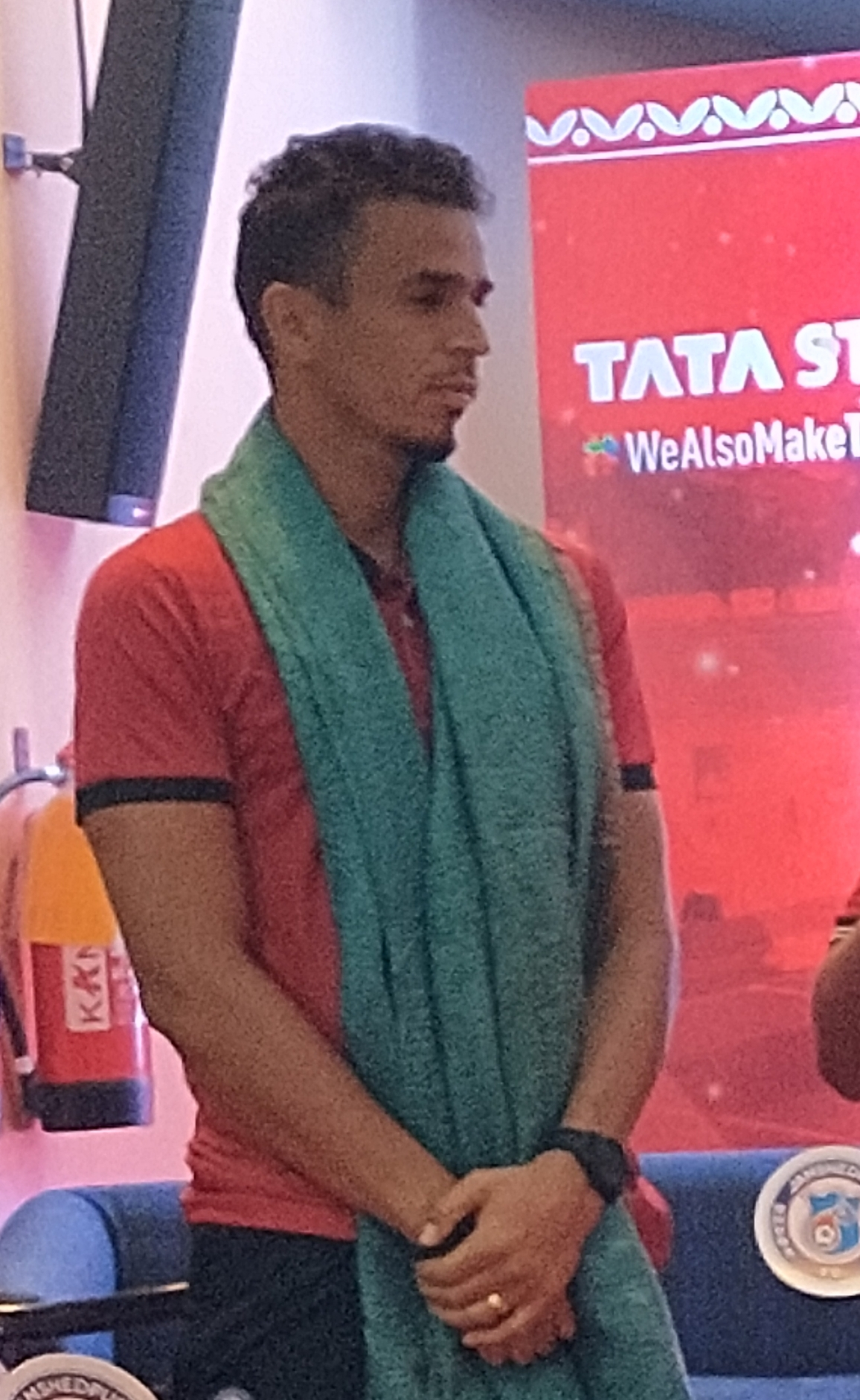
- Memo in 2019

Personal information
- Full name: Emerson Gomes de Moura
- Date of birth: 14 February 1988 (age 38)
- Place of birth: Bonito, Brazil
- Height: 1.80 m (5 ft 11 in)
- Positions: Defensive midfielder; centre-back

Youth career
- 2003–2006: América-PE
- 2007: Santa Cruz

Senior career*
| Years | Team | Apps | (Gls) |
| 2007–2015 | Santa Cruz | 55 | (2) |
| 2008 | → Treze (loan) | | |
| 2009 | → Botafogo-PB (loan) | | |
| 2010 | → Crato (loan) | | |
| 2013 | → Ponte Preta (loan) | 14 | (0) |
| 2013 | → Oeste (loan) | 11 | (0) |
| 2015 | Linense | 13 | (0) |
| 2015 | Mogi Mirim | 12 | (0) |
| 2015–2016 | Itumbiara | 9 | (0) |
| 2016 | América (RN) | 14 | (0) |
| 2016 | Delhi Dynamos | 10 | (0) |
| 2016–2017 | América (RN) | 0 | (0) |
| 2017 | Fluminense de Feira | 8 | (0) |
| 2017–2020 | Jamshedpur | 54 | (3) |
| 2020–2021 | Chennaiyin | 19 | (0) |
- * Club domestic league appearances and goals as of 13:15, 10 December 2020 (UTC)

Emerson Gomes de Moura, known simply as Memo (born 14 February 1988), is a Brazilian professional footballer who plays as a defensive midfielder and center-back.

== Career ==
Born in Bonito, Memo started his professional career with Pernambuco side Santa Cruz. He became an important part of manager Zé Teodoro's squad and was named in the 2012 Campeonato Pernambucano selection. Memo scored a memorable goal for Santa Cruz in the 2012 Copa do Brasil first round as the club was eliminated by Penarol.

Portuguesa manager Candinho expressed an interest in signing Memo for their Série A campaign during June 2012.

In early 2013, Memo joined Ponte Preta on a loan deal. On 7 July, he moved to Oeste on loan after being surplus to Ponte Preta's requirements. At the end of the year, he returned to Santa Cruz. After a stint with Linense in Campeonato Paulista, he switched to Mogi Mirim on 8 August 2015. In the following year, he represented Itumbiara and América RN.

On 8 September 2016, Memo moved abroad and signed for the Indian Super League franchise Delhi Dynamos FC. He debuted the following month, playing ninety minutes in a 1–0 defeat against Atletico de Kolkata. On 27 December 2016, Memo returned to Brazil and signed with América (RN). However, he was released by the club on 17 April 2017, though he was allowed to train with the club. He subsequently signed with fourth-tier club Fluminense de Feira Futebol Clube.

In August 2017, Memo returned to the Indian Super League and signed for Jamshedpur FC.

On 4 October 2020, Memo signed for Indian Super League club Chennaiyin FC.

== Honours ==
Santa Cruz

- Pernambuco State League: 2011, 2012
