= Anas Edathodika =

Indian footballer (born 1987)

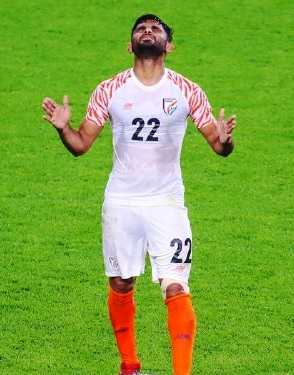
- Anas celebrating after India's win against Thailand at the 2019 AFC Asian Cup.

Personal information
- Date of birth: 15 February 1987 (age 39)
- Place of birth: Kondotty, Kerala, India
- Height: 1.82 m (5 ft 11 1/2 in)
- Position: Centre-back

Senior career*
Years	Team	Apps	(Gls)
2007–2011	Mumbai	110	(5)
2011–2015	Pune	106	(0)
2015–2017	Delhi Dynamos	36	(1)
2017	→ Mohun Bagan (loan)	18	(0)
2017–2018	Jamshedpur	18	(0)
2018–2019	Kerala Blasters	18	(0)
2019–2020	ATK	20	(2)
2021–2022	Jamshedpur	34	(8)
2023–2024	Gokulam Kerala FC	26	(4)
2024	Malappuram FC	5	(0)

International career
2017–2019	India	28	(0)
- * Club domestic league appearances and goals

Anas Edathodika (born 15 February 1987) is a former Indian professional footballer who played as a centre-back.

== Club career ==
=== Early career ===
Born in Kondotty, Malappuram, Kerala, He studied in the EMEA College of Arts and Science, Kondotty. Anas began to take up football as a serious activity when he was in tenth grade, joining the Malappuram U14s. While playing football, Anas also worked as a driver who would drive people around town for Rs. 180 a day. He then joined the football team of N.S.S College, Manjeri, where he groomed his skills under Dr. P.M. Sudhir Kumar. Eventually, he was spotted by former India international Feroz Sherif while playing in an inter-collegiate game. Sherif advised Anas to attend the trials for I-League 2nd Division side Mumbai which Edathodika did. He passed the trials and was signed by the club on a one-year deal.

After one season with Mumbai, Anas managed to lead the club to promotion to the I-League. After helping the club gain promotion he was re-signed by the club on a three-year deal. While at Mumbai, Anas credited his former head coach Dave Booth for making him the defender he is today.

=== Pune ===
After playing for four seasons with Mumbai Anas signed for rivals Pune F.C. of the I-League on a two-year deal on 23 July 2011. On his signing, Pune's Head of Operations, Chirag Tanna, said "We have been tracking Anas's progress since the last two years and we are glad that he has signed a two-year contract". One of his first matches for the club came up in a friendly against English Premier League side Blackburn Rovers at the Balewadi Sports Complex on 7 October 2011. However, the match did not last long for Anas as he was sent off after 15 minutes for his second yellow card for a rough tackle on Mauro Formica.

Before the 2012–13 season it was revealed that Anas had been hit with malaria which made him miss part of Pune's pre-season. However, it was reported that on 2 August 2012 that he had returned to Pune's pre-season training. After that set-back Anas had his best season yet in his footballing career in which he started in all 26 matches for Pune in the I-League, helping the Pune defence concede only twenty-six goals that season. Due to this feat Anas managed to win the Pune Football Club Player of The Year award for 2012–13. In winning the award, he became the first Indian to win the club's biggest award and also the first defender to win it.

As another reward for his impressive two seasons at the club, Anas was offered a two-year contract extension by the club which he accepted.

==== 2013–14 season ====
Going onto the 2013–14 season Anas was named as the club captain. He led the side in the club's first league match of the season against Mohammedan at the Salt Lake Stadium on 21 September 2013. Anas played the full match for Pune as the club won the match 3–1. After the match, he said on wearing the captain's armband for the first time that he was very honoured and that he thanked the new head coach, Mike Snoei, on giving him the opportunity to lead the side, "Honestly much honoured… great. I had never worn the captain's armband ever. This was a first in my playing career at any level as far as my memory stretches and I am thankful to one and all for this opportunity. Initially, the coach said he was taking a risk by fielding me in the playing eleven, but when he announced that I was leading the side I got the confidence I needed. I thank coach for helping me believe."

=== Delhi Dynamos ===
In 2015, he was picked up by Delhi Dynamos. Later in 2016, the club sent Anas to A-League club Central Coast Mariners for a week long trial cum training camp.

=== Jamshedpur ===
On 23 July 2017, Anas was selected in the first round of the 2017–18 ISL Players Draft by Jamshedpur for the 2017–18 Indian Super League, thus making him the first player in Jamshedpur history. He made his debut for the club during the first-ever match on 18 November 2017 against NorthEast United. He started and played the whole match as Jamshedpur drew 0–0.

=== Kerala Blasters ===
In 2018, he was signed by Kerala Blasters, his home club. He partnered with his national teammate Sandesh Jhingan at centre-back.

=== ATK ===
In 2019, he signed for ATK. He was given the number 30 jersey.

== International career ==
Anas made his senior international debut for India on 22 March 2017 in a 3-2 friendly win against Cambodia. He represented India at the 2019 AFC Asian Cup.

== Career statistics ==
=== Club ===
As of 4 March 2022

Club	Season	League			Cup		AFC		Total	
Club	Season	Division	Apps	Goals	Apps	Goals	Apps	Goals	Apps	Goals
Pune	2011–12	I-League	23	0	0	0	—		23	0
Pune	2012–13	I-League	26	0	5 (Note: Appearance(s) in Federation Cup) (Note: Appearance(s) in Durand Cup)	0	—		31	0
Pune	2013–14	I-League	17	0	3	0	5 (Note: Appearance(s) in AFC Champions League) (Note: Appearance(s) in AFC Cup)	0	25	0
Pune	2014–15	I-League	10	0	0	0	—		10	0
Pune	Pune total		76	0	8	0	5	0	89	0
Delhi Dynamos	2015	Indian Super League	14	1	0	0	—		14	1
Delhi Dynamos	2016	Indian Super League	11	0	0	0	—		9	0
Delhi Dynamos	Delhi Dynamos total		25	1	0	0	0	0	25	1
Mohun Bagan (loan)	2016–17	I-League	17	0	4	0	5	0	26	0
Jamshedpur	2017–18	Indian Super League	8	0	2 (Note: Appearance() in Super Cup)	0	—		10	0
Kerala Blasters	2018–19	Indian Super League	8	0	1	0	—		9	0
ATK	2019–20	Indian Super League	9	0	0	0	—		9	0
Jamshedpur	2021–22	Indian Super League	4	0	0	0	—		4	0
Career total			147	1	15	0	10	0	172	1

=== International ===
As of matches played till 19 November 2019

National team	Year	Apps	Goals
India	2017	9	0
India	2018	7	0
India	2019	5	0
Total		21	0

== Honours ==
India

- Tri-Nation Series: 2017
- Intercontinental Cup: 2018

Individual

- I-League "Jarnail Singh" Award for Best Defender: 2016–17
