= Subrata Paul =

Indian footballer (born 1986)

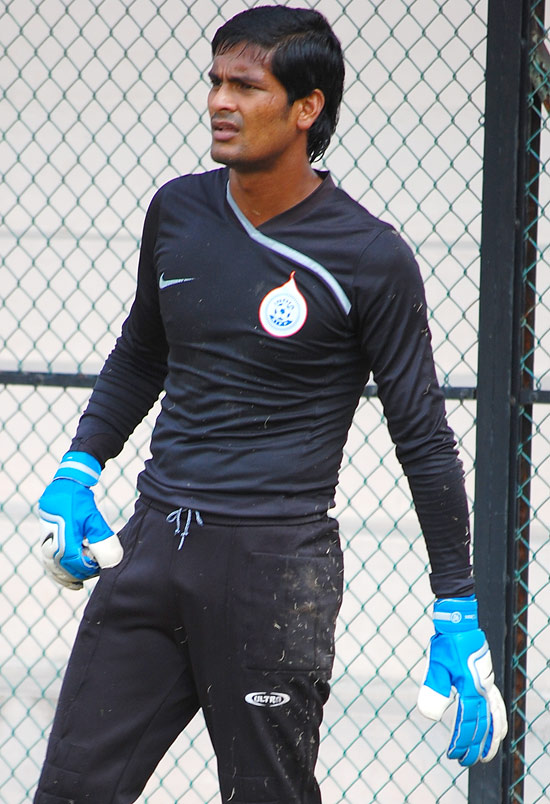
- Paul training with India in 2008

Personal information
- Full name: Subrata Paul
- Date of birth: 24 December 1986 (age 39)
- Place of birth: Sodepur, West Bengal, India
- Height: 1.85 m (6 ft 1 in)
- Position: Goalkeeper

Youth career
- 2002–2004: Tata Football Academy

Senior career*
Years	Team	Apps	(Gls)
2004–2007	Mohun Bagan	32	(0)
2007–2009	East Bengal	56	(0)
2009–2012	Pune	84	(1)
2012–2013	Prayag United	32	(0)
2013-2014	→ Rangdajied United (loan)	28	(0)
2014-2015	→ Vestsjælland (loan)	18	(0)
2015–2016	Mumbai City	26	(0)
2016-2017	→ Salgaocar (loan)	14	(0)
2017–2018	NorthEast United	32	(0)
2018-2019	→ DSK Shivajians (loan)	24	(0)
2019–2020	Jamshedpur	46	(0)
2020–2022	Hyderabad	48	(0)
2022	→ East Bengal (loan)	8	(0)
2022	→ Mohun Bagan (loan)	14	(0)
Total		446	(0)

International career
2004-2007	India U23	28	(0)
2007–2018	India	84	(0)
Medal record
Men's football
Representing India
AFC Challenge Cup
Winner	2008 India
SAFF Championship
Winner	2015 India
Runner-up	2008 Maldives & Sri Lanka
Runner-up	2013 Nepal
- * Club domestic league appearances and goals

Subrata Pal (commonly called Paul) (Bengali: সুব্রত পাল; born 24 December 1986) is an Indian former professional footballer who played as a goalkeeper. Considered one of India's best goalkeepers, he was awarded the Arjuna Award by the government of India in 2016.

== Club career ==
=== Mohun Bagan ===
A graduate of the Tata Football Academy, Paul started his senior career with Mohun Bagan in 2004. During the 2004 Federation Cup final against Dempo on 5 December 2004, Dempo forward Cristiano Júnior lost his life after he and Paul collided. Following the incident, lack of facilities and medical professionals during the game was highlighted, leading to significant changes in the I-League.

=== East Bengal ===
Subrata was signed by local rivals East Bengal in 2007. He was an important figure for his team during the time he spend for the Kolkata-based club and was adjudged the I-League's best goalkeeper in 2007 for his outstanding shot-stopping abilities, an example of which was in East Bengal's Federation Cup winning campaign of 2007, resulting in his team qualifying for the AFC Cup 2008. Subrata appeared 31 times in the league for East Bengal and was the first choice 'keeper for the Kolkata-based team.

=== Pune ===
On 2 June 2009, Subrata joined Pune FC. In the middle of the I-League 2009-10 season, Subrata had a trial stint with Canadian side Vancouver Whitecaps in the summer of 2010. Subrata expressed his desire to play abroad in the professional leagues of North America, Europe and Asia. He later said that "There was no offer coming from any club agent of any country during the Asian Cup. But I am looking for any offer to play abroad. Europe is the best place to play. But I am game to go to countries like South Korea, Japan, Australia and even the West Asian countries like Qatar, Saudi Arabia."

=== Prayag United ===
Paul signed for Prayag United of the I-League on 9 May 2012. He made his debut for the club on 7 October 2012 against Air India at the Salt Lake Stadium in Kolkata, a match Prayag won 5–1.

Paul started off well in the 2011-12 I-League, impressing the new coach, however his form would soon wear thin. On 29 December 2012, Prayag United lost to I-League struggles Sporting Goa. The next seven matches from the aforementioned defeat, his team lost 5 and drew once and this was enough for his coach to replace Subrata with Sangram Mukherjee in the remaining league matches of the season.

=== Rangdajied United ===
Subrata signed a contract with Indian Super League to play in the new league which was to start in 2014. However, due to signing-up for the ISL, the I-League clubs refused to sign Subrata as they were all opposed to the Indian Super League, but, on 20 November 2013, despite rejecting ISL signed players earlier, Rangdajied United of the I-League agreed to sign Paul along with fellow ISL contracted players Gouramangi Singh, Sandesh Jhingan, Manandeep Singh, and Tomba Singh. He made his debut in the I-League on 22 November 2013 against Shillong Lajong at the Jawaharlal Nehru Stadium, Shillong in which he played the whole match as Rangdajied drew 1–1.

=== FC Vestsjaelland ===
On 9 January 2014, it was confirmed that Paul had signed for FC Vestsjælland of the Danish Superliga, thus becoming the fourth Indian footballer to play professionally abroad, the second to join a top-tier European side, and the first Indian goalkeeper to play abroad. Despite signing on as member of the squad, he did not make any appearance for the first team and only appeared with the reserve squad.

=== Mumbai City FC ===
Subrata was drafted in by ISL club Mumbai City FC during the 2014 edition of the league and was the first choice 'keeper for his team until 2015, appearing 26 times in the league format. Subrata's performance was notable but not enough to help his team into the semi-finals.

=== Salgaocar ===
Subrata joined Salgaocar of the I-League on loan from Mumbai City FC for the season as fellow Indian international Karanjit Singh, the regular 'keeper of Salgaocar would miss most of the 2014-15 I-League season due to injury.

=== DSK Shivajians ===
After spending the 2016 ISL season with NorthEast United, Paul was loaned to I-League side DSK Shivajians on 15 December 2016.

=== Jamshedpur ===
On 23 July 2017, Pal was selected in the second round of the 2017–18 ISL Players Draft by Jamshedpur for the 2017–18 Indian Super League. He made his debut for the club in their first ever match on 18 November 2017 against Paul's former club, NorthEast United. Pal started the match and kept the clean sheet as Jamshedpur drew the match 0–0.

After the season concluded, Pal was awarded the Indian Super League Golden Glove Award. A month later it was announced that Pal had been retained by the club for the 2018–19 season.

=== Later career and retirement ===
After leaving Jamshedpur in 2019, Paul joined Hyderabad FC in 2020. He played six matches for Hyderabad with two clean sheets before being loaned out to East Bengal. He was then signed by Mohun Bagan in January 2022 on a loan deal for the remainder of their season. After not playing for more than a year, Pal announced retirement from professional football on 8 December 2023 at the age of 36.

== International career ==
Subrata has played for India at all age groups. He rose to prominence with the Under-23 team in the Pre-Olympic qualifiers where he pulled off 3 saves in a crucial penalty shootout against Myanmar hence enabling India to qualify for the Group stage. In the group stages his goalkeeping abilities helped India pull off an unexpected draw at home against the formidable Iraq.

In 2007, he replaced Sandip Nandy as the Indian Senior Team's number 1 for the Nehru Cup in 2007 where he was adjudged the best goalkeeper in a competitive field which included the likes of Mosab Balhous.

=== Nehru Cup 2007 ===
Paul was noted for his sharp goalkeeping as part of Baichung Bhutia's successful Indian team of the Nehru Cup 2007. His saves were noted in the semi-finals against Kyrgyzstan, which enabled India to reach the finals of this tournament for the first time. In the final, India faced Syria, against whom they had lost an earlier group stage match. In this match, he staved off wave after wave of attack by the Qasioun Eagles. India defeated Syria by a 1–0 margin to win the tournament for the first time. Coach Bob Houghton said that "Subrata was splendid in goal", while The Hindu wrote:

India owed the triumph immensely to an impeccable performance under the bar by Subrata Paul. His anticipation in cutting off Syria’s aerial forays was the most striking feature of the contest.

=== AFC Challenge Cup 2008 ===
He was part of the victorious India national football team in the AFC Challenge Cup 2008. His important saves especially in the finals helped India qualify for the 2011 AFC Asian Cup for the first time in 24 years.

=== Nehru Cup 2009 ===
He was also part of the victorious India national football team in the Nehru Cup International Football Tournament 2009 He was involved in three spectacular saves, and put the Cup back in India's hands. Due to his keeping, India won the final match 5–3 on penalties. He stopped the deciding shot on goal to help India clinch the Nehru cup.

=== AFC Asian Cup 2011 ===
He was the goalkeeper for the Indian football Team in the AFC Asian Cup 2011. He made more than 35 saves in the whole tournament and has become one of the stars of the team since. After the game against South Korea, he made the headlines by some leading newspapers who were calling him 'Spiderman', 'real MVP (Most Valuable Player)' and with headlines like 'Indian team GK, 16 times super-save! Who is this guy?'. To these references, he humbly said, "I am not a spiderman, just a novice learning my goalkeeping. I am happy that I have made those saves and done something for the team and country." The Times of India said that Pal was the best performer among the Indians in the Asian Cup in Doha where they lost all their group matches. Had it not for Pal's heroics, India would have lost by bigger margins in all the three matches.

=== World Cup 2014 Qualifiers ===
He was also the first choice goalkeeper for India in their World Cup Qualifier match against UAE. Subrata even captained the side in a warm-up practice match for this tie, which India won against Qatar 2–1. He could not repeat his heroics against the UAE side as he was sent off in the first 30 minutes, and India were reduced to 9 men. India lost that game 3–0 as a result of two penalties and ultimately the tie 4–2.

=== World Cup 2018 Qualifiers ===
He was named the captain of the India national football team by coach Stephen Constantine on 11 March 2015. Under his captaincy the team reached the second round after defeating Nepal on aggregate of 2–0 on the first round of qualification.

== Career statistics ==
=== Club ===
As of 24 May 2022

Club	Season	League			Cup		Continental		Total	
Club	Season	Division	Apps	Goals	Apps	Goals	Apps	Goals	Apps	Goals
Prayag United	2012–13	I-League	15	0	0	0	—		15	0
Rangdajied United (loan)	2013–14	I-League	6	0	0	0	—		6	0
Vestsjælland (loan)	2013–14	Danish Superliga	0	0	0	0	—		0	0
Mumbai City	2014	Indian Super League	14	0	0	0	—		14	0
Mumbai City	2015	Indian Super League	12	0	0	0	—		12	0
Salgaocar (loan)	2014–15	I-League	15	0	5 (Note: Appearance(s) in Federation Cup)	0	—		20	0
DSK Shivajians (loan)	2015–16	I-League	14	0	0	0	—		14	0
NorthEast United	2016	Indian Super League	11	0	0	0	—		11	0
DSK Shivajians (loan)	2016–17	I-League	10	0	2	0	—		12	0
Jamshedpur	2017–18	Indian Super League	18	0	1 (Note: Appearance(s) in Super Cup)	0	—		19	0
Jamshedpur	2018–19	Indian Super League	15	0	0	0	—		15	0
Jamshedpur	2019–20	Indian Super League	15	0	0	0	—		15	0
Hyderabad	2020–21	Indian Super League	6	0	0	0	—		6	0
East Bengal (loan)	2020–21	Indian Super League	4	0	0	0	—		4	0
Mohun Bagan (loan)	2021–22	Indian Super League	0	0	0	0	1 (Note: Appearance(s) in AFC Cup)	0	1	0
Career total			155	0	8	0	1	0	164	0

=== International ===
Statistics accurate as of 16 June 2017

National team	Year	Apps
India	2007	7
India	2008	12
India	2009	6
India	2010	9
India	2011	10
India	2012	5
India	2013	8
India	2014	2
India	2015	6
India	2017	2
Total		67

== Honours ==
India

- AFC Challenge Cup: 2008
- SAFF Championship: 2015; runner-up: 2008, 2013
- Nehru Cup: 2007, 2009, 2012
- Tri-Nation Series: 2017

Individual

- Arjuna Award: 2016
- East Bengal "Player of the Season Award": 2008

== Personal life ==
Subrata lives with his family in Sodepur (Kolkata). Subrata is married to Debasmita Mukherjee Pal, the daughter of ex-Indian goalkeeper Debashish Mukherjee, since 2012.

=== Awards and nominations ===
In 2016 Subrata got the Arjuna Award, the most prestigious award of Sports in India. In 2015, Subrata Pal was nominated for the Times of India Sports Awards along with the likes of Sunil Chhetri, Syed Rahim Nabi, Bala Devi and more.

== See also ==
- List of Indian football players in foreign leagues
