= Jamshedpur FC =

Association football club in India

Jamshedpur
- Full name: Jamshedpur Football Club
- Nicknames: The Men of Steel; The Red Miners; The Men of Fire
- Short name: JFC
- Founded: 12 June 2017; 9 years ago
- Dissolved: 14 August 2026; 2 months ago
- Ground: JRD Tata Sports Complex
- Capacity: 24,424
- Chairman: Chanakya Chaudhary
- League: Indian Super League
- 2025–26: Indian Super League, 5th of 14
- Website: www.fcjamshedpur.com
Home colours	Away colours

Jamshedpur Football Club (/ˈdʒæmʃɛdpʊər/, Hindi: [d͡ʒəmˈʃeːd̪pʊɾ]) was an Indian professional football club based in Jamshedpur, Jharkhand. Founded in 2017, the club competed in the Indian Super League, the top flight of Indian football, from the 2017–18 season to the 2025–26 season. It was the only club in the top flight to have a self-owned stadium and training facilities. The club was owned and managed by Tata Steel until August 2026, when ownership of Jamshedpur Football & Sporting Private Limited (JFSPL), along with the club's ISL sporting licence, was transferred to Churchill Brothers FC.

The club was established on 12 June 2017, when Tata Steel won the bidding rights for one of the two expansion slots in the ISL. Former Crystal Palace manager Steve Coppell was appointed as Jamshedpur's first manager.

The club made their ISL debut during 2017–18 season and missed a place in semi-finals narrowly and finished at 5th position, in the next season also saw they finishing at 5th. After a disappointing 2019–20 campaign the club appointed Owen Coyle as their new manager. Under Owen Jamshedpur FC won the ISL League Winners' Shield during 2021–22 season, their first trophy and becoming only the third club to win the League Winners' Shield after FC Goa and Mumbai City FC.

At the start of the 2026–27 season, the club withdrew from the Indian Super League, ending its nine-year association with the competition. The club subsequently transferred its ownership and sporting licence to Churchill Brothers FC in August 2026. Tata Steel stated that the transfer was intended to provide continuity for the club's players and coaching staff, while it would continue its football activities at the grassroots and youth levels through programmes including the Tata Football Academy.

== History ==
=== Formation ===
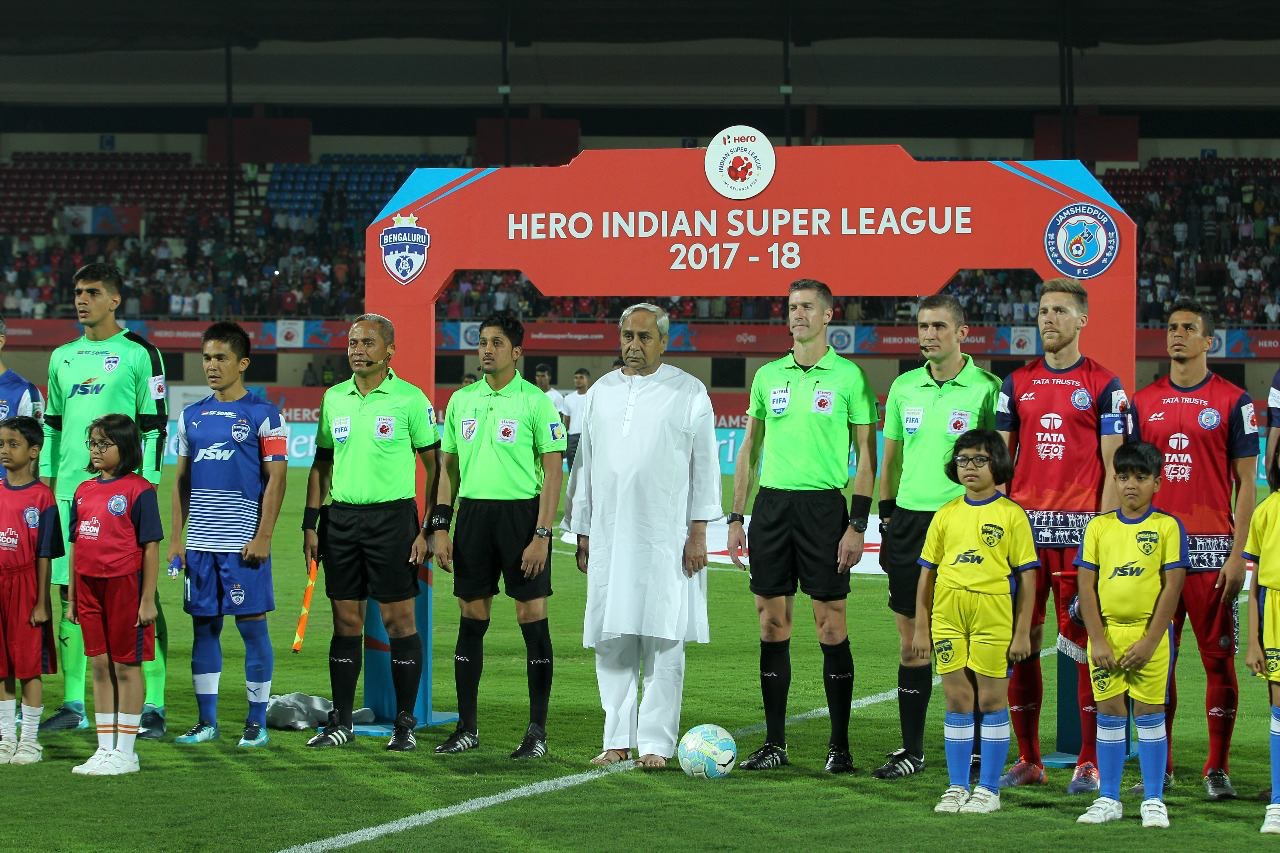
Jamshedpur FC players (right) lining up before their match against Bengaluru FC at the Kalinga Stadium in 2018.

On 11 May 2017, Indian Super League organisers invited bids for new teams (Ahmedabad, Bangalore, Cuttack, Durgapur, Hyderabad, Jamshedpur, Kolkata, Ranchi, and Siliguri) in order to expand the league in the upcoming season. The bidding ended on 25 May 2017 and the external validator, appointed by the league, started scrutinizing the bids. Two weeks later, on 12 June, it was officially announced that Bengaluru FC and Tata Steel had won the bids for the new teams Bengaluru and Jamshedpur respectively.

After winning the bid, Tata announced on 14 July 2017 that the inaugural head coach for the new Jamshedpur club would be Steve Coppell, who led the Kerala Blasters to the final in the previous ISL season. The club's official name, Jamshedpur FC, and logo were revealed nine days later, on 23 July, before the 2017–18 ISL Players Draft. Being a brand new club, Jamshedpur FC had the first pick during the players draft. India international Anas Edathodika was the club's first draft pick, thus the first player in Jamshedpur's history.

=== Inaugural season ===
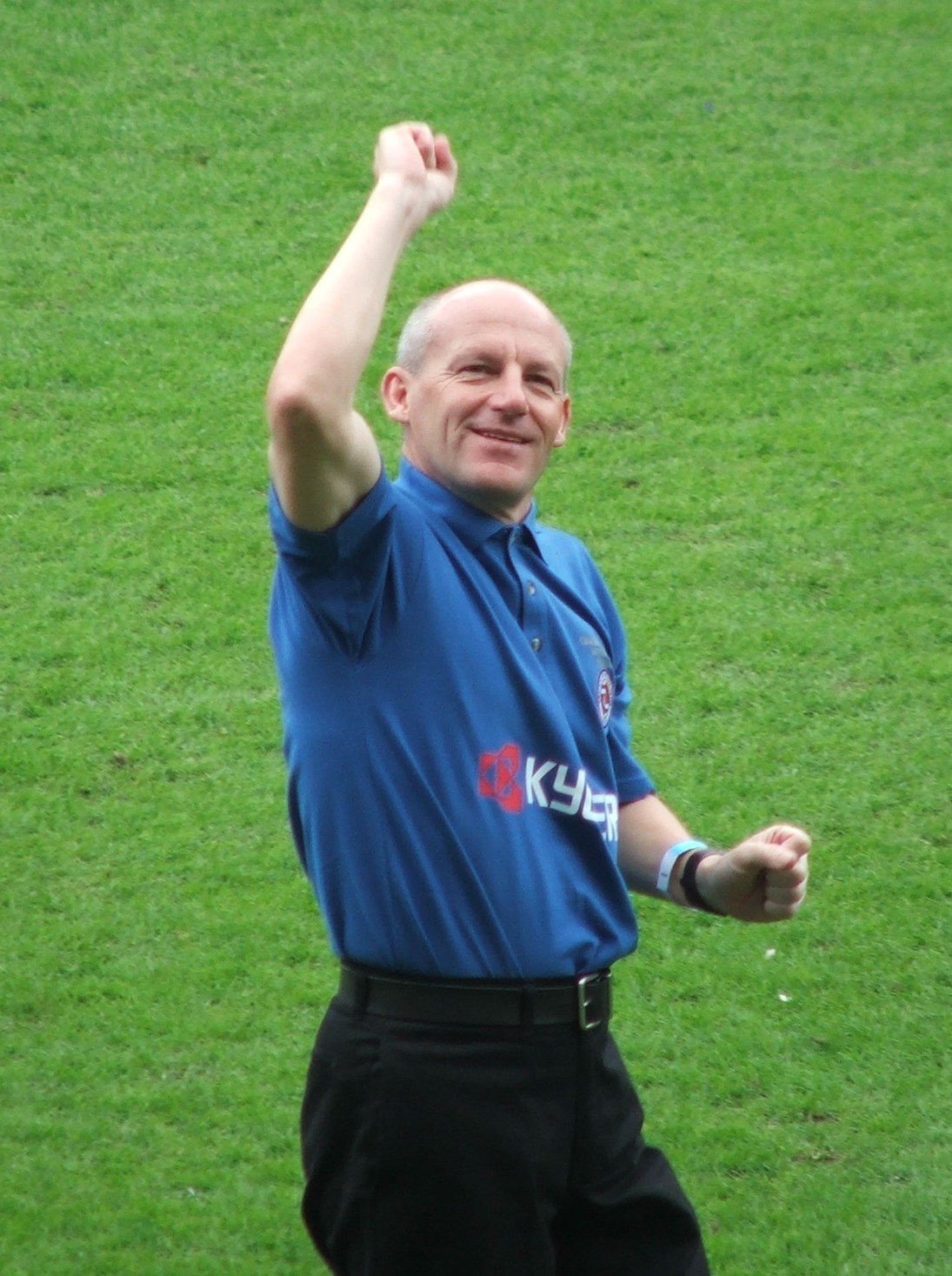
Steve Coppell is the club's first coach.

Jamshedpur played their first-ever match on 18 November 2017 against NorthEast United at the Indira Gandhi Athletic Stadium. Despite being disadvantaged through defender André Bikey being sent off, Jamshedpur managed to hold on for a 0–0 draw. After another goalless draw in their next match, Jamshedpur played their first official home match on 1 December against the reigning champions ATK. Over 23,000 fans came to support the side at the JRD Tata Sports Complex but once again, the team failed to do more than draw 0–0. Finally, in their fourth match, away at Delhi Dynamos, Jamshedpur managed to earn their first victory. The club won 1–0 with Izu Azuka becoming the first-ever Jamshedpur goal scorer.

By the halfway point of the season, Jamshedpur had only managed two victories in the season including four draws and three defeats. This meant the team was in seventh place, six points off the playoff spots. Fortunes changed for Jamshedpur during the second half of the season and on 4 March 2018, the club played their final match of the Super League season at home against Goa with Jamshedpur needing a victory in order to qualify for the playoffs. Unfortunately, despite having home advantage, Jamshedpur fell 3–0 and thus failed to qualify for the finals in their first season.

=== 2018–19 season ===
Jamshedpur FC appointed Cesar Ferrando as their new head coach ahead of the 2018–19 season and made some overall changes to their squad. Michael Soosairaj, Sergio Cidoncha, Carlos Calvo and Mario Arques were some of the new signings along with Tiri, Memo, Subrata, and Farukh, who were retained from the last season. The club also made one of the most high-profile signings in the league's history as they roped in Tim Cahill to their squad. The team had a decent start in the season as they won against Mumbai City and had as draw against Bengaluru FC at home. They were about to make it into the play-offs, but narrowly lost out on the play-off spot to NorthEast United and finished 5th in the table just like their inaugural season. In Hero Super Cup, which took place at Bhubaneswar, they were given a walkover against Churchill Brothers in the round of 16. In the next round, they lost against FC Goa and were knocked out of the tournament.

=== 2019–20 season ===
Jamshedpur FC appointed Antonio Iriondo as their head coach ahead of the 2019–20 season of Indian Super League. As in the previous season, they signed some new players like C.K. Vineeth, who was the highest Indian goalscorer of Kerala Blasters. Among the foreign players, they signed Aitor Monroy, Sergio Castel and Francisco Medina Luna and retained their core players like Tiri. Some of the young Indian players like Narender Gahlot and Amarjit Singh Kiyam were bought into the team Jamshedpur had an impressive start as they were unbeaten in the first 3 matches like in the previous two seasons. They started their season by defeating Odisha FC 2–1. They won against Hyderabad FC 3–1 in their second match and had a goalless draw against Bengaluru FC. The team had their first defeat of the season against ATK in an away match where the match ended 3–1. It took some more games for the club to get their third win of the season as they defeated FC Goa. The team then had three back to back draws followed by three back to back defeats against Mumbai City FC, Odisha FC and Bengaluru FC. Unlike the previous two seasons, the club had a disappointing season as they were only able to finish eight place in the table. With eight defeats, they had the second most defeats along with NorthEast United FC and only had 4 wins during the season.

=== 2020–21 season ===
After a disappointing season, the club made some major changes at their helm as they appointed Owen Coyle, who led the struggling Chennaiyin FC into the ISL final in the last season. They made a total of twelve signings ahead of the season. Changes in the squad including releasing most of the Indian players from the squad. Among the foreign players only Aitor Monroy and David Grande was retained. The club roped in the last season's joint top scorer Nerijus Valskis. They signed Peter Hartley and former Nigerian International Stephen Eze in their defence. Brazilian Alex Monteiro and Australian Nick Fitzgerald were the other signings ahead of the season. Jackichand Singh was one of the major Indian signings along with the players like T.P Rehenesh, Laldinliana Renthlei and Ricky Lallawmawma.

Due to the COVID-19 pandemic, the 2020–21 season were decided took place behind the closed-doors across three venues in Goa. Tilak Maidan Stadium in Vasco da Gama was selected as the home ground of Jamshedpur FC.

=== 2022–23 season ===
After a record-breaking season on 22 March 2022 club officially announced that head coach Owen Coyle will not be continuing his journey at Jamshedpur. The club released an official statement stating:

Jamshedpur FC head hoach Owen Coyle announced that he won't be continuing his journey in India. The Scotsman had a successful two years with the club which he continuously kept on improving. He lifted the Jamshedpur side to 6th place in 2020-21, just 4 points shy off the top-4 places with a historic Hero ISL League Shield Winners’ campaign.

On 10 July 2022, Aidy Boothroyd was appointed as head coach of Jamshedpur. He said:

Jamshedpur FC are the Champions of India currently and the city has a tremendous football legacy. We want to continue this upward trajectory and make the club reach places and win honours that our fans are dreaming of. We want to take the club to the next level and to compete really with the top teams of Asia.

On 14 July 2022, Jamshedpur FC confirmed the extension of Leslie Cleevely as Goalkeeping Coach of the club. The coach, fondly called 'Les', signed up to May 2023 and joined Aidy Boothroyd's coaching staff. When asked about his thoughts on extending his stay at Jamshedpur after a successful season, Leslie stated:

When I received the offer to come back as goalkeeping coach and defend our Hero ISL league title, it didn't take any persuasion. I'm looking forward to getting to work with our exciting roster of goalkeepers and of course Aidy Boothroyd who is a fantastic coach and the right man for the job.

On 16 July 2022, club appointed Stuart Watkiss as assistant coach. Upon signing for the ISL League Shield winners Stuart opined:

It's a big job at Jamshedpur FC, the defending Champions of India. I come with the aim to help the club win back-to-back league titles and also help bring more honours. Along with a top Head Coach like Aidy Boothroyd, the club aims for the maximum and we will take it one game at a time. Looking forward to it.

=== 2023–24 season ===
After a disappointing season, the club parted ways with head coach Aidy Boothroyd. Ahead of 2023–24 season, Jamshedpur FC appointed Irish-English manager Scott Cooper as the club's new head coach on a two-year contract. He is known for his attacking style of play and high-pressing football. In his 4–3–3 system, Cooper likes to create natural triangles, allowing his players to keep better possession of the ball.

Upon being appointed, Scott Cooper said "It is an honour and a privilege to join Jamshedpur FC as their new head coach. The club has previously won the ISL Shield trophy and I believe it's time for us to get back to the top once again. The city of Jamshedpur has a rich history and footballing culture with the prestigious Tata Football Academy nurturing talent and creating top Indian footballers since time immemorial, and one of my aims is to develop young players and make them ready to compete at the highest level".

He was joined by Hezirdan Ramadani and Dragan Draskovic as the club's new assistant coach and goalkeeping coach, respectively.

On 29 December, the club officially announced that they had mutually parted ways with Scott Cooper. Two days later, the club announced the appointment of Khalid Jamil as the new manager.

The club ended the season second last in the table, securing 21 points from 22 games.

=== 2026–27 season – Withdrawal from the Indian Super League and ownership transfer ===
The club began the 2026–27 campaign by participating in the 2026 Durand Cup, opening their tournament with a 5–0 victory over Sri Lanka Army under coach Kaizad Ambapardiwalla.

On 31 July 2026, the club announced that it would not participate in the 2026–27 Indian Super League, ending its nine-year association with the competition after being a founding member since the 2017–18 season.

The withdrawal followed the expiry of the AIFF's extended deadline for clubs to pay the first instalment of the league participation fee under the new club-led commercial structure. The club did not pay the ₹5.5 million first instalment by the 31 July deadline after previously seeking an extension to complete internal shareholder approval procedures.

Club captain Pronay Halder stated that the players were informed of the decision during a team meeting shortly before the club's public announcement, describing the news as "devastating" and saying that the squad had been fully focused on the Durand Cup campaign. Halder also said that the withdrawal came as a surprise to the players and expressed uncertainty over the future of those with existing contracts.

According to a letter submitted by club chief executive Mukul Choudhari to the AIFF, the decision to withdraw was primarily due to the inability of Jamshedpur Football and Sporting Private Limited (JFSPL) to generate sufficient cashflows to operate the club. Choudhari stated that the club's shareholders believed the existing business model for participation in the Indian Super League was "structurally financially unviable for the foreseeable future".

On 14 August 2026, Tata Steel announced that it had agreed to transfer its entire 100% equity stake in JFSPL to Churchill Brothers Football Club for a token consideration of ₹100, subject to AIFF regulations. The agreement included the transfer of Jamshedpur FC's Indian Super League sporting licence.

As part of the agreement, Churchill Brothers agreed to take over the contracts of 12 Jamshedpur FC players and two coaches from September 2026, allowing them to continue their professional careers in the Indian Super League.

Tata Steel stated that it would continue its involvement in football through grassroots and youth development programmes, including the Tata Football Academy, while repurposing its sporting infrastructure for grassroots football and athlete development.

==== Final match ====
Jamshedpur played their final match as a club on 17 August 2026, facing Mohun Bagan SG in the quarter-finals of the 2026 Durand Cup. The match ended 1–1 after extra time, with Mohun Bagan SG winning 9–8 on penalties. Forward Devendra Murgaonkar scored the final goal in the club's history.

== Stadium ==
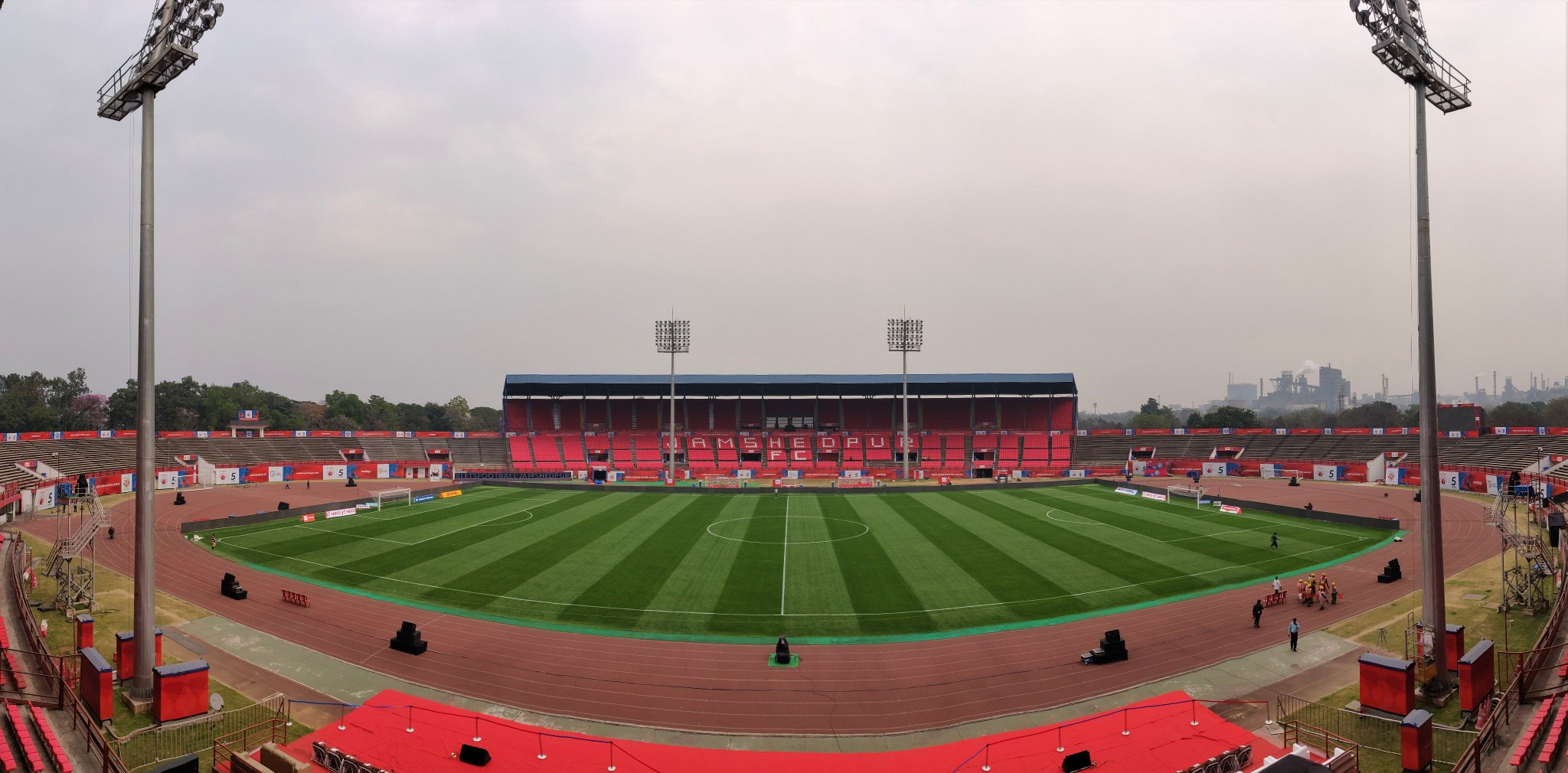
Panoramic view of the JRD Tata Sports Complex

They play their home games at JRD Tata Sports Complex, popularly known as "The Furnace". The club is the only club in the Indian Super League to have a stadium of its own. The stadium was named after the former Tata Group chairman J. R. D. Tata. The stadium was originally built in 1991, with a capacity for 60,000 spectators. In 2017, the stadium was renovated with the capacity of 24,424 (limited capacity for ISL games) – 40,000 (for other sports).

== Supporters ==
The Red Miners are the official supporters group of the club which was founded in 2017 along with the inception of the club. The players and the coach have often acknowledged the fans' support in the success by calling them The 12th Man.

== Crest, colours and kits ==
Jamshedpur FC Crest

The outer circle of the crest features the name of the club written in English and tribal symbols, paying tribute to the tribal history of Jharkhand state.

In 2017, Jamshedpur signed a deal with Nivia Sports as their official kit sponsors from the 2017–18 season.

=== Kit manufacturers and shirt sponsors ===
Period	Kit manufacturer	Shirt sponsor	Back sponsor
2017–19	Nivia	Tata	Tata Steel
2019–20	Nivia	Tata Steel	Tata Trusts
2020–21	Nivia	Tata Steel	Tata Pravesh
2021–26	Nivia	Tata Steel	SBI

== Personnel ==
=== Last technical staff ===
Position	Name
Head coach	(Republic of Ireland) Owen Coyle
Assistant coach	(Scotland) Sandy Stewart (India) Steven Dias
Goalkeeping coach	(India) Harshad Meher
Strength & conditioning coach	(India) Akash Nani
Head of youth development and grassroots	(India) Kundan Chandra
First team analyst	Vacant
Head - Physiotherapy & Sports medicine	(India) Vivek Nigam
First team assistant physiotherapist	(India) Arghya Basu

=== Corporate hierarchy ===
Position	Name
Chairman & director	(India) D B Sundra Ramam
Directors	(India) Sunil Bhaskaran
Directors	(India) Pradipta Baagchi
Directors	(India) Suprakash Mukhopadhyay
Directors	(India) Sandeep Bhattacharya
CEO	(India) Mukul Choudhari
CFO	(India) Prasanta Dinda
Secretary	(India) Melisa Alva
General Manager	(India) Prashant Madhav Godbole
Manager Operation	(India) Rohit Kr. Singh
Manager - Media	(India) Amit Kumar
Managers	(India) Vikas Anthony, Praveen Kumar, Kevin Kishore, Saadat Hussain
Executives	(India) Nil Raj Mukhi, Arun Sinha

== Statistics and records ==
=== Season by season ===
As of match played by 18 April 2025

Season	League	Teams	League Position	Playoffs Position	Indian Super Cup	Durand Cup	AFC competition(s)
2017–18	ISL	10	5th	Did not qualify	Quarter-final	—	—
2018–19	ISL	10	5th	Did not qualify	Quarter-final	—	—
2019–20	ISL	10	8th	Did not qualify	_	Group stage	—
2020–21	ISL	11	6th	Did not qualify	_	—	—
2021–22	ISL	11	Premiers	Semi-finals	_	Group Stage	—
2022–23	ISL	11	10th	Did not qualify	Semi-finals	Group Stage	—
2023–24	ISL	12	11th	Did not qualify	Semi-finals	Group Stage	Qualification Round
2024–25	ISL	13	5th	Semi-finals	Runners-up	Group Stage	-

=== Managers statistics ===
As of 18 April 2025

Name	Nationality	From	To	P	W	D	L	GF	GA	GD	Win%
Steve Coppell	England	14 July 2017	18 June 2018	20	8	5	7	17	23	−6	40.00
César Ferrando	Spain	21 July 2018	5 April 2019	19	6	9	4	32	25	+7	31.58
Antonio Iriondo	Spain	26 July 2019	29 February 2020	18	4	6	8	22	35	−13	22.22
Owen Coyle	Scotland	7 August 2020	22 March 2022	42	20	11	11	64	45	+19	47.62
Aidy Boothroyd	England	10 July 2022	13 July 2023	25	8	4	13	33	42	−9	32.00
Scott Cooper	England	14 July 2023	29 December 2023	12	2	3	7	12	15	−3	16.67
Khalid Jamil	India	31 December 2023	present	44	22	5	17	70	72	−2	50.00

== Honours ==
=== Domestic ===
League

- Indian Super League
  - League Winners' Shield
    - Winners (1): 2021–22
- Super Cup
  - Runners-up (1): 2025 (April)

== Training facilities ==
JFC Training Center (also known as the "Flatlet") is the training and relax center for Jamshedpur FC, located in Kadma, Jamshedpur. Besides the training field, the building comes with a fully equipped cross-fit gym, a swimming pool, and recreation centers. The project is lined with the vision of the club, where international-level training equipment would be available to the players. After its design plans were approved in April 2018, the groundbreaking ceremony of the all-weather training arena was held on 25 November 2017.

Jamshedpur FC takes part in a number of grassroots-level youth development activities, such as the Tata Football Academy (now known as Jamshedpur FC Academy). The academy was awarded four stars in 2019–20 season by AIFF.

== Affiliated club(s) ==
- (Spain) Atlético de Madrid
- (India) Tata Football Academy (Note: The players participate in the RFDL as a part of the Jamshedpur FC's youth team.)

== eSports ==
The organizers of ISL introduced eISL, a FIFA video game tournament, for the ISL playing clubs, each represented by two players. Jamshedpur FC hosted a series of qualifying games for all the participants wanting to represent the club in eISL. On 20 November the club announced the signing of the two players.

=== Roster ===
Jamshedpur FC eSports FIFA roster
Players
Coaches

Handle	Name	Nationality
ArvindMass_	S, Arvind	India
Akash_ash24499	Babu, Akash	India

Head coach

- Vacant

Legend:
- (I) Inactive
- (S) Suspended
- Substitute
- (injured) Injury / Illness

Latest roster transaction: 19 November 2021.

== See also ==
- List of football clubs in India
- Tata Football Academy
