= 2020–21 Kerala Blasters FC season =

7th season in existence of Kerala Blasters FC

Kerala Blasters
2020–21 season
- Chairman: Nikhil Bhardwaj
- Head Coach: Kibu Vicuña (until 17 February 2021); Ishfaq Ahmed (remainder of season)
- Stadium: GMC Athletic Stadium (Note: Due to the COVID-19 pandemic in India, the 2020–21 Indian Super League season would be held entirely in Goa, behind closed doors and Kerala Blasters was allotted the GMC Athletic Stadium as their home ground for the season.)
- Indian Super League: Final league position:10th
- Play-offs: DNQ
- AIFF Super Cup: Cancelled
- Top goalscorer: League: Jordan Murray (7 goals); All: Jordan Murray (7 goals)
- Average home league attendance: 🔒 Closed Doors
Home colours	Away colours	Third colours

The 2020–21 season was the seventh season in Kerala Blasters FC's existence, as well as their seventh season in Indian Super League. Due to COVID-19 pandemic, all the matches in the seventh season of ISL were played behind closed doors in three venues at Goa. GMC Athletic Stadium was chosen as the home venue for the Blasters.

== Season overview ==
=== Background ===
On 15 March 2020, Kerala Blasters appointed Karolis Skinkys as their new Sporting director ahead of the new season. On 22 April, the club officially announced the signing of Kibu Vicuña as their new manager. The most surprising move was the departure of Sandesh Jhingan: he departed the club on 21 May in a mutual consent thus ending his six years association with the club. The CEO, Viren D'Silva, also left the club on the same day.

=== July ===
On 1 July 2020, Kerala Blasters officially announced that they had extended the contract of Jessel Carneiro until 2023

On 8 July, the club announced the signing of goalkeeper Albino Gomes on a free transfer from Odisha FC.

On 15 July, it was announced that the young midfielder Ritwik Das has joined the club from Real Kashmir.

The signing of Nishu Kumar was finally confirmed by the club on 22 July. The four-year deal made Nishu the highest paid Indian defender.

On 29 July, the club announced the contract extension of Abdul Hakku until 2023.

=== August ===
On 5 August, Kerala Blasters completed the signing of left back Denechandra Meitei from TRAU F.C.

On 12 August, it was announced that Sahal has extended his contract for three more years with the Blasters which made him to stay at the club until 2025.

On 19 August, the club announced the signing of Indian Under 19 midfielder Givson Singh from Indian Arrows.

On 22 August, Blasters announced the signing of Sandeep Singh from TRAU F.C.

On 26 August, the club completed the signing of Rohit Kumar from Hyderabad FC.

On 28 August, the departure of captain Bartholomew Ogbeche was officially announced by the club.

=== September ===
On 2 September, Kerala Blasters announced the signing of Facundo Pereyra as their first foreign signing of the season. He became the first Argentine to sign for the club.

On 9 September, the club announced the signing of India National Under 20 goalkeeper Prabhsukhan Singh Gill on a two-year deal.

On 12 September, Kerala Blasters announced the contract extension of local boy Prasanth Karuthadathkuni until 2021.

On 16 September, the club announced the signing of young midfielder Puitea from NorthEast United FC on a three-year deal.

On 19 September, Blasters extended the contract of Seityasen Singh until 2022.

On 23 September, Blasters announced the signing of Spanish Midfielder Vicente Gómez Umpiérrez on a three-year deal.

On 30 September, Blasters announced the contract extension of Rahul KP until 2025.

=== October ===
On 5 October, the Blasters announced the signing of Gary Hooper on a one-year deal.

On 8 October, the Blasters started their pre-season training camp under the assistant coach Ishfaq Ahmed.

On 9 October, the Blasters announced the signing of Costa Nhamoinesu. After this deal, Nhamoinesu became the first Zimbabwean to play for the club.

On 21 October, the Blasters announced the signing of Burkina Faso international defender Bakary Koné as their sixth foreign signing of the season.

On 24 October, the Blasters announced the signing of Australian forward Jordan Murray as their AFC affiliated player and final foreign signing of the season.

=== November ===
On 7 November, the Blasters announced its association with BYJU'S, the world's largest Ed-Tech company, as their new title sponsor with an option to extend the sponsorship.

On 18 November, the Blasters announced Costa Nhamoinesu, Sergio Cidoncha, and Jessel Carneiro as the captains ahead of the new season with Nhamoinesu being the first choice captain.

On 20 November, the Blasters lost 1–0 to ATK Mohun Bagan in the 2020–21 ISL season opener.

On 26 November, the Blasters drew 2–2 against NorthEast United FC.

On 29 November, the Blasters had a goalless draw against Chennaiyin FC in the South Indian Derby.

=== December ===
On 6 December, the Blasters lost 3–1 against FC Goa.

On 8 December, the Blasters confirmed that the club captain Sergio Cidoncha, who tore his right ankle ligament during the match against Chennaiyin has left for Spain to recover from the injury and will miss the remainder of the season.

On 12 December, the Blasters extended the contract of Jeakson Singh until 2023.

On 13 December, the Blasters lost 4–2 against Bengaluru in the South Indian Derby.

On 20 December, the Blasters drew 1–1 against SC East Bengal.

On 27 December, the Blasters won 2–0 against Hyderabad FC, registering their first victory of the season.

On 28 December, the Blasters announced the signing of Juande as an injury replacement of Cido for the remainder of the season.

On 29 December, the Blasters announced that they have signed Subha Ghosh from ATK Mohun Bagan on a three-year contract; a swap deal with Nongdamba Naorem for whom the Blasters received an undisclosed transfer fee.

=== January ===
On 2 January 2021, the Blasters lost 2–0 against Mumbai City FC.

On 7 January, the Blasters lost 4–2 against Odisha FC.

On 9 January, the Blasters extended the contract of Prasanth K until 2023.

On 10 January, the Blasters won 3–2 against Jamshedpur FC. After this game, Sahal Abdul Samad became the player with second most appearances for the Blasters.

On 15 January, the Blasters drew 1–1 against SC East Bengal. The game saw Albino Gomes becoming the first Indian goalkeeper and only second goalkeeper overall to provide an assist in Indian Super League.

On 20 January, the Blasters defeated Bengaluru FC 2–1 in the Southern Derby.

On 23 January, the Blasters drew 1–1 against FC Goa.

On 27 January, the Blasters had a goalless draw against Jamshedpur FC.

On 29 January, the Blasters confirmed that Facundo Pereyra has suffered a broken nose before the match against Jamshedpur FC.

On 31 January, the Blasters lost 3–2 against ATK Mohun Bagan FC.

=== February ===
On 4 February, the Blasters lost 1–2 against Mumbai City FC.

On 11 February, the Blasters drew 2–2 against Odisha FC.

On 16 February, the Blasters lost 4–0 to Hyderabad FC.

On 17 February, the club parted ways with their head coach Kibu Vicuna on mutual consent. Ishfaq Ahmed was appointed as the interim head coach for the remainder of season.

On 20 February, the club extended the contract of defender Sandeep Singh until 2022.

On 21 February, the Blasters drew 1–1 against Chennaiyin FC in the Southern Derby.

On 26 February, the Blasters lost 2–0 against NorthEast United FC in their final match of the league.

== Players ==
Note: The list contains all the players who were registered by the club for the 2020-21 season

As of 29 December 2020

No.	Name	Nationality	Position(s)	Date of Birth (Age)
Goalkeepers
1	Bilal Khan	(India)	GK	12 September 1994 (age 31)
13	Prabhsukhan Singh Gill	(India)	GK	2 January 2001 (age 25)
32	Albino Gomes	(India)	GK	7 February 1994 (age 32)
77	Muheet Shabir	(India)	GK	7 August 2001 (age 24)
Defenders
3	Sandeep Singh	(India)	CB	1 March 1995 (age 31)
4	Bakary Koné	(Burkina Faso)	CB	27 April 1988 (age 37)
5	Nishu Kumar	(India)	RB/LB	5 October 1997 (age 28)
14	Jessel Carneiro (Captain)	(India)	LB	14 July 1990 (age 35)
24	Abdul Hakku	(India)	CB	6 October 1994 (age 31)
26	Costa Nhamoinesu (vice-captain)	(Zimbabwe)	CB	6 January 1986 (age 40)
39	Lalruatthara	(India)	CB/LB	7 January 1995 (age 31)
45	Denechandra Meitei	(India)	LB	28 January 1994 (age 32)
Midfielders
6	Prasanth Karuthadathkuni	(India)	RW/RM/RB	24 June 1997 (age 28)
7	Seityasen Singh	(India)	RW	12 March 1992 (age 34)
8	Rohit Kumar	(India)	CDM	1 April 1997 (age 29)
10	Facundo Pereyra	(Argentina)	LW/RW/AM	3 September 1987 (age 38)
11	Givson Singh	(India)	CM	5 June 2001 (age 24)
15	Jeakson Singh	(India)	CDM	21 June 2001 (age 24)
17	Rahul K P	(India)	RW	16 March 2000 (age 26)
18	Sahal	(India)	CM/AM	1 April 1997 (age 29)
31	Juande	(Spain)	CDM/CB	12 August 1986 (age 39)
20	Ayush Adhikari	(India)	CM	30 July 2000 (age 25)
25	Vicente Gómez	(Spain)	DM/CM	31 August 1988 (age 37)
27	Ritwik Das	(India)	CM/RW	14 December 1996 (age 29)
47	Puitea	(India)	CM/RW	30 March 1998 (age 28)
99	Muktasana Sharma	(India)	CM	1 February 2001 (age 25)
Forwards
9	Jordan Murray	(Australia)	FW	2 October 1995 (age 30)
49	Subha Ghosh	(India)	FW	22 December 2000 (age 25)
88	Gary Hooper	(England)	FW	26 January 1988 (age 38)

=== Other players under contract ===
Note: Player was deregistered from Indian Super League squad due to an injury.

No.	Name	Nationality	Position(s)	Date of Birth (Age)
22	Sergio Cidoncha	(Spain)	CM/AM	27 August 1990 (age 35)

=== Contract Extensions ===
No	Player	Position	Contract Till	Ref.
14	(India) Jessel Carneiro	Left Back	2023	
18	(India) Sahal Abdul Samad	Central/Attacking Midfielder	2025	
24	(India) Abdul Hakku	Centre-back	2023	
17	(India) Rahul Kannoly Praveen	Winger	2025	
7	(India) Seityasen Singh	Right Midfielder/Right Winger	2022	
11	(India) Prasanth K	Winger	2023	
15	(India) Jeakson Singh	Defensive midfielder	2023	
3	(India) Sandeep Singh	Centre back/ Right back	2022	

== Transfers ==
=== Transfers In ===
Date	Player	Position	No.	Last Club	Fee	Ref.
8 July 2020	(India) Albino Gomes	GK	32	(India) Odisha FC	Free transfer	
15 July 2020	(India) Ritwik Das	CM	23	(India) Real Kashmir FC	Free transfer	
22 July 2020	(India) Nishu Kumar	LB/RB	22	(India) Bengaluru FC	Free transfer	
5 August 2020	(India) Denechandra Meitei	LB	45	(India) TRAU F.C.	Free transfer	
19 August 2020	(India) Givson Singh	AM	27	(India) Indian Arrows	₹32 lakh (equivalent to ₹38 lakh or US$45,000 in 2023)	
22 August 2020	(India) Sandeep Singh	CB/RB	5	(India) TRAU F.C.	Free transfer	
26 August 2020	(India) Rohit Kumar	CM/DM	13	(India) Hyderabad FC	Free transfer	
2 September 2020	(Argentina) Facundo Pereyra	AM/SS	7	(Cyprus) Apollon Limassol FC	Free transfer	
9 September 2020	(India) Prabhsukhan Singh Gill	GK	47	(India) Bengaluru FC	Free transfer	
16 September 2020	(India) Puitea	MF/RW	30	(India) Northeast United FC	Free transfer	
23 September 2020	(Spain) Vicente Gómez Umpiérrez	DM	4	(Spain) Deportivo de La Coruña	Free transfer	
5 October 2020	(England) Gary Hooper	FW	9	(Australia) Wellington Phoenix FC	Free transfer	
10 October 2020	(Zimbabwe) Costa Nhamoinesu	CB/LB	26	(Czech Republic) AC Sparta Prague	Free transfer	
21 October 2020	(Burkina Faso) Bakary Koné	CB	3	Free agent	Free transfer	
24 October 2020	(Australia) Jordan Murray	FW	25	(Australia) Central Coast Mariners FC	Free transfer	
28 December 2020	(Spain) Juande	DM/CM	19	(Australia) Perth Glory FC	Free transfer	
29 December 2020	(India) Subha Ghosh	FW	49	(India) ATK Mohun Bagan FC	Free transfer	

=== Promotion from reserves and youth ===
Date	Player	Position	No.	Promoted From	Ref.
9 October 2020	(India) Naorem Mahesh Singh	FW	–	(India) Kerala Blasters B (U21)	
9 October 2020	(India) Nongdamba Naorem	MF	–	(India) Kerala Blasters B	
9 October 2020	(India) Shaiborlang Kharpan	FW	–	(India) Kerala Blasters B	
9 October 2020	(India) Ayush Adhikari	MF	–	(India) Kerala Blasters B	
9 October 2020	(India) Gotimayum Muktasana Sharma	MF	–	(India) Kerala Blasters B	
9 October 2020	(India) Muheet Shabir Khan	GK	–	(India) Kerala Blasters B (U18)	

=== Loan Returns ===
Position	No.	Player	From
LW	19	(India) Nongdamba Naorem	(India) Mohun Bagan A.C.
FW	10	(Slovenia) Matej Poplatnik	(Hungary) Kaposvári Rákóczi FC

=== Loan Outs ===
Position	No.	Player	To
FW	23	(India) Naorem Mahesh Singh	(India) Sudeva Delhi FC
FW	19	(India) Shaiborlang Kharpan	(India) Sudeva Delhi FC

=== Transfers Out ===
Exit Date	Player	Position	No.	To	Fee	Ref.
21 May 2020	(India) Sandesh Jhingan	DF	21	(India) ATK Mohun Bagan FC	Free transfer	
22 May 2020	(India) Samuel Lalmuanpuia	MF	27	(India) Odisha FC	Free Transfer	
27 June 2020	(India) Pritam Kumar Singh	DF	23	(India) East Bengal FC	Free Transfer	
4 July 2020	(Serbia) Slaviša Stojanovic	FW	8	(Serbia) OFK Bačka	Free Transfer	
8 July 2020	(Slovenia) Matej Poplatnik	FW	10	(Scotland) Livingston FC	Undisclosed	
13 August 2020	(India) Halicharan Narzary	LW	19	(India) Hyderabad FC	Free Transfer	
28 August 2020	(Nigeria) Bartholomew Ogbeche	FW	10	(India) Mumbai City FC	Free transfer	
8 September 2020	(India) TP Rehenesh	GK	13	(India) Jamshedpur FC	Free transfer	
24 September 2020	(Cameroon) Raphaël Messi Bouli	FW	28	(China) Heilongjiang Lava Spring FC	Free transfer	
25 September 2020	(India) Shibinraj Kunniyil	GK	42	(India) Churchill Brothers S.C.	Free transfer	
4 October 2020	(India) Darren Caldeira	MF	15	Retired	–	
4 October 2020	(Spain) Mario Arqués	MF	6	(Malaysia) Kelantan FC	Free transfer	
27 October 2020	(North Macedonia) Vlatko Drobarov	DF	33	(Bulgaria) PFC Cherno More Varna	Free transfer	
4 October 2020	(Senegal) Moustapha Gning	MF	7	(Spain) SD Ejea	Free transfer	
20 October 2020	(India) Mohammad Rakip	DF	2	(India) Mumbai City FC	Free transfer	
5 November 2020	(Netherlands) Gianni Zuiverloon	DF	51	(Netherlands) ADO Den Haag	Free transfer	
4 October 2020	(India) Mohammed Rafi	FW	20	Free agent		
4 October 2020	(India) Raju Gaikwad	DF	5	(India) SC East Bengal	Free transfer	
27 October 2020	(Brazil) Jairo Rodrigues	DF	3	(Portugal) G.D. Fabril	Free transfer	
4 December 2020	(India) Arjun Jayaraj	MF	30	(India) Kerala United FC	Free transfer	
29 December 2020	(India) Nongdamba Naorem	LW	16	(India) ATK Mohun Bagan FC	Undisclosed fee + player	

== Management ==
As of 17 February 2021

Role	Name
Head Coach/Manager	(Spain) Kibu Vicuna (18 games) (India) Ishfaq Ahmed (interim) (2 games)
Assistant Coach	(Poland) Tomasz Tchórz
Sporting Director	(Lithuania) Karolis Skinkys
Physical Trainer	(Lithuania) Paulius Ragauskas
Goalkeeping Coach	(India) Yusuf Ansari
Tactical & Analytical Coach	(Spain) David Ochoa

== Pre-season and friendlies ==
Win Draw Loss Cancelled

Owing the COVID-19 pandemic, all the clubs including Kerala Blasters FC couldn't have a proper preseason. The preseason time was cut short this season. The Blasters began their preseason against one of their fellow Indian Super League opponent, Hyderabad FC on 25 October 2020. Both squads had fielded Indian players only as the foreign players were on quarantine. In the end, the Blasters beat Hyderabad 2–0 with Rahul K.P. netting both the goals.

25 October 2020 Friendly	(India) Kerala Blasters	2–0	(India) Hyderabad	Goa, India
16:00 IST	Rahul Praveen ' '	Report		Stadium: Tilak Maidan; Attendance: Closed doors

30 October 2020 Friendly	(India) Kerala Blasters	0–0	(India) Mumbai City	Goa, India
14:00 IST		Report		Stadium: GMC Stadium, Bambolim; Attendance: Closed doors

10 November 2020 Friendly	(India) Kerala Blasters	1–3	(India) East Bengal	Goa, India
16:00 IST	Hooper	Report	Pilkington; Yumnam	Stadium: Tilak Maidan; Attendance: Closed doors

14 November 2020 Friendly	(India) Kerala Blasters	3–0	(India) Jamshedpur	Goa, India
16:00 IST	Sahal; Hooper; Lourenco (o.g.)	Report		Stadium: GMC Stadium, Bambolim; Attendance: Closed doors

== Competitions ==
Win Draw Loss

Competition	First match	Last match	Starting round	Record							
Competition	First match	Last match	Starting round	Pld	W	D	L	GF	GA	GD	Win %
Super League	20 November 2020	2021	Matchday 1	19	3	8	8	23	36	−13	15.79
Super Cup	2021	2021	TBA	0	0	0	0	0	0	+0	—
Total				19	3	8	8	23	36	−13	15.79

Last updated: 26 February 2021.
Source: Competitions

=== Indian Super League ===
==== League table ====
Pos	Team	Pld	W	D	L	GF	GA	GD	Pts
7	Bengaluru	20	5	7	8	26	28	−2	22
8	Chennaiyin	20	3	11	6	17	23	−6	20
9	East Bengal	20	3	8	9	22	33	−11	17
10	Kerala Blasters	20	3	8	9	23	36	−13	17
11	Odisha	20	2	6	12	25	44	−19	12

Source: Indian Super League
Rules for classification: 1) points; 2) head-to-head points; 3) head-to-head goal difference; 4) head-to-head goals scored; 5) goal difference; 6) number of goals scored; 7) fair play ranking; 8) drawing of lots

==== League Results by round ====
Round	1	2	3	4	5	6	7	8	9	10	11	12	13	14	15	16	17	18	19	20
Result	L	D	D	L	L	D	W	L	L	W	D	W	D	D	L	L	D	D	D	L
League Position	11	8	7	9	9	9	9	9	10	10	10	9	7	8	9	9	9	9	10	10

Updated to match(es) played on 16 February 2021. Source: Matchday
W = Win; D = Draw; L = Loss

=== Matches ===
20 November 2020 1	Kerala Blasters	0–1	ATK Mohun Bagan	Bambolim
19:30 IST	Samad (yellow card) 73'; Pereyra (yellow card) 89'	Report	Halder (yellow card) 38'; Garcia (yellow card) 42'; Krishna 67'	Stadium: GMC Athletic Stadium; Attendance: 0 Referee: Crystal John; Man of the Match: Krishna (ATKMB)

26 November 2020 2	Kerala Blasters	2–2	Northeast United	Bambolim
19:30 IST	Cido 5'; Rohit (yellow card) 37'; Hooper 45+1' (pen.); Seityasen (yellow card) 48'	Report	Appiah 51'; Gurjinder (yellow card) 72'; Sylla 90'	Stadium: GMC Athletic Stadium; Attendance: 0 Referee: Ranjit Baksi; Man of the Match: Fox (NEUFC)

29 November 2020 3	Chennaiyin	0–0	Kerala Blasters	Bambolim
19:30 IST	Reagan (yellow card) 20'	Report	Kone (yellow card) 45'; Cido (yellow card) 74'; Prasanth (yellow card) 83'	Stadium: GMC Athletic Stadium; Attendance: 0 Referee: Rahul Kumar Gupta; Man of the Match: Albino (KBFC)

6 December 2020 4	Goa	3–1	Kerala Blasters	Margao
21:00 IST	Angulo 30', 90+4'; Ortiz 52'	Report	Rohit (yellow card) 34'; Nhamoinesu (yellow card) 40' (yellow-red card) 90+2'; Rahul (yellow card) 66'; Gómez 90'	Stadium: Fatorda Stadium; Attendance: 0 Referee: Harish Kundu; Man of the Match: Angulo (FCG)

13 December 2020 5	Bengaluru	4–2	Kerala Blasters	Goa, India
19:30 IST	Silva 29'; Juanan (yellow card) 38'; Kuruniyan (yellow card) 45'; Paartalu 52'; Dimas 53'; Chhetri 65'; Khabra (yellow card) 90'; Muirang (yellow card) 90'	Report	Rahul 17'; Lalruatthara (yellow card) 55'; Murray 61'; Nishu (yellow card) 77'; Sandeep (yellow card) 90'	Stadium: Fatorda; Attendance: 0 Referee: Crystal John; Man of the Match: Delgado (BFC)

20 December 2020 6	Kerala Blasters	1–1	East Bengal	Bambolim
19:30 IST	Rahul (yellow card) 13'; Koné (yellow card) 58'; Jeakson 90+4'	Report	Koné 13' (o.g.); Haobam (yellow card) 35'; Surchandra (yellow card) 72'; Fox (yellow card) 83'; Neville (yellow card) 90'	Stadium: GMC Athletic Stadium; Attendance: 0 Referee: Tejas Nagvenkar; Man of the Match: Pilkington (SCEB)

27 December 2020 7	Kerala Blasters	2–0	Hyderabad	Bambolim
19:30 IST	Samad (yellow card) 20'; Hakku 29'; Jeakson (yellow card) 32'; Murray 88'; Pereyra (yellow card) 90'	Report	Ralte (yellow card) 90+2'	Stadium: GMC Athletic Stadium; Attendance: 0 Referee: Ranjit Baksi; Man of the Match: Jeakson (KBFC)

2 January 2021 8	Mumbai City	2–0	Kerala Blasters	Bambolim
19:30 IST	Le Fondre 3' (pen.); Hugo Boumous 11'; Amrinder Singh (yellow card) 24'; Hugo Boumous (yellow card) 68'; Hernán Santana (yellow card) 85'	Report	Gómez (yellow card) 39' Sandeep (yellow card) 70'	Stadium: GMC Athletic Stadium; Attendance: 0 Referee: Rahul Kumar Gupta; Man of the Match: Amrinder (MCFC)

7 January 2021 9	Kerala Blasters	2–4	Odisha	Bambolim
19:30 IST	Murray 7'; Gómez (yellow card) 63'; Hooper 79'	Report	Jeakson 22' (o.g.); Steven Taylor 42'; Diego Maurício 50', 60'	Stadium: GMC Athletic Stadium; Attendance: 0 Referee: Pratik Mondal; Man of the Match: Maurício (OFC)

10 January 2021 10	Jamshedpur	2–3	Kerala Blasters	Goa, India
19:30 IST	Nerijus Valskis 36', 84'	Report	Costa 22'; Jeakson (yellow card) 38'; Lalruatthara (yellow card) 49' (yellow-red card) 67' Murray 79', 82'	Stadium: Tilak Maidan; Attendance: 0 Referee: L Ajitkumar Meitei; Man of the Match: Murray (KBFC)

15 January 2021 11	East Bengal	1–1	Kerala Blasters	Goa, India
19:30 IST	Scott Neville 90'	Report	Jordan Murray 64'	Stadium: Tilak Maidan; Attendance: 0 Referee: Harish Kundu; Man of the Match: Sahal (KBFC)

20 January 2021 12	Kerala Blasters	2–1	Bengaluru	Bambolim
19:30 IST	Puitea 73'; Rahul 90+4' (yellow card)	Report	Cleiton 23'; (yellow card) 90+5'; Juanan (yellow card) 52'	Stadium: GMC Athletic Stadium; Attendance: 0 Referee: Harish Kundu; Man of the Match: Rahul (KBFC)

23 January 2021 13	Kerala Blasters	1–1	Goa	Bambolim
19:30 IST	Rahul (yellow card) 35' (goal) 57'; Jeakson (yellow card) 63'	Report	Ortiz 25'; González (yellow card) 65' (yellow-red card) 65'; Naveen (yellow card) 87'	Stadium: GMC Athletic Stadium; Attendance: 0 Referee: Ranjit Baksi; Man of the Match: Sandeep (KBFC)

27 January 2021 14	Kerala Blasters	0–0	Jamshedpur	Bambolim
19:30 IST		Report	Monroy (yellow card) 72'	Stadium: GMC Athletic Stadium; Attendance: 0 Referee: C R Srikrishna; Man of the Match: Sahal (KBFC)

31 January 2021 15	ATK Mohun Bagan	3–2	Kerala Blasters	Goa, India
19:30 IST	Marcelinho 59'; Krishna 65' (pen.), 87'	Report	Hooper 14'; Nhamoinesu 51'	Stadium: Fatorda; Attendance: 0 Referee: L Ajitkumar Meitei; Man of the Match: Krishna (ATKMB)

3 February 2021 16	Kerala Blasters	1–2	Mumbai City	Bambolim
19:30 IST	Gómez 27'; Nhamoinesu (yellow card) 45'; Juande (yellow card) 69'	Report	Fall (yellow card) 45+2'; Bipin 46'; Le Fondre 67' (pen.); Mandar (yellow card) 88'	Stadium: GMC Athletic Stadium; Attendance: 0 Referee: Rahul Kumar Gupta; Man of the Match: Amrinder(MCFC)

11 February 2021 17	Odisha	2–2	Kerala Blasters	Bambolim
19:30 IST	Jordan Murray 52'; Hooper 68'	Report	Maurício 45', 74'	Stadium: GMC Athletic Stadium; Attendance: 0 Referee: Tejas Nagvenkar; Man of the Match: Maurício (OFC)

16 February 2021 18	Hyderabad	4–0	Kerala Blasters	Goa, India
19:30 IST		Report		Stadium: Fatorda; Attendance: 0 Referee: L Ajit Metei; Man of the Match: Francisco Sandaza (HFC)

21 February 2021 19	Chennaiyin	1–1	Kerala Blasters	Bambolim
19:30 IST	Hooper 29' (pen.)	Report	Fatkhullo 10'	Stadium: GMC Athletic Stadium; Attendance: 0 Referee: Pratik Mondal; Man of the Match: Chhangte (CFC)

26 February 2021 20	NorthEast United	2–0	Kerala Blasters	Goa, India
19:30 IST	V.P. Suhair 34'; Lalengmawia 45'	Report		Stadium: Tilak Maidan; Attendance: 0 Referee: Crystal Johnson; Man of the Match: Lalengmawia (NEUFC)

== Statistics ==
All stats are as of 26 February 2021

=== Squad appearances and goals ===
No.	Pos	Nat	Player	Total		Super League		Super Cup	
No.	Pos	Nat	Player	Apps	Goals	Apps	Goals	Apps	Goals
Goalkeepers
1	GK	(India) IND	Bilal Khan	0	0	0	0	0	0
13	GK	(India) IND	Prabhsukhan Singh Gill	0	0	0	0	0	0
32	GK	(India) IND	Albino Gomes	20	0	20	0	0	0
77	GK	(India) IND	Muheet Shabir	0	0	0	0	0	0
Defenders
3	DF	(India) IND	Sandeep Singh	14	0	14	0	0	0
4	DF	(Burkina Faso) BFA	Bakary Kone	14	0	14	0	0	0
5	DF	(India) IND	Nishu Kumar	9	0	9	0	0	0
45	DF	(India) IND	Denechandra Meitei	6	0	6	0	0	0
14	DF	(India) IND	Jessel Carneiro	16	0	16	0	0	0
24	DF	(India) IND	Abdul Hakku	3	1	3	1	0	0
26	DF	(Zimbabwe) ZIM	Costa Nhamoinesu	16	2	16	2	0	0
39	DF	(India) IND	Lalruatthara	5	0	5	0	0	0
Midfielders
6	MF	(India) IND	K Prasanth	13	0	13	0	0	0
7	MF	(India) IND	Seityasen Singh	12	0	12	0	0	0
8	MF	(India) IND	Rohit Kumar	11	0	11	0	0	0
10	MF	(Argentina) ARG	Facundo Pereyra	12	0	12	0	0	0
11	MF	(India) IND	Givson Singh	3	0	3	0	0	0
15	MF	(India) IND	Jeakson Singh	16	1	16	1	0	0
18	MF	(India) IND	Sahal Abdul Samad	14	0	14	0	0	0
20	MF	(India) IND	Ayush Adhikari	1	0	1	0	0	0
22	MF	(Spain) ESP	Sergio Cidoncha	3	1	3	1	0	0
25	MF	(Spain) ESP	Vicente Gómez	19	2	19	2	0	0
31	MF	(Spain) ESP	Juande	10	0	10	0	0	0
27	MF	(India) IND	Ritwik Das	4	0	4	0	0	0
47	MF	(India) IND	Puitea	10	1	10	1	0	0
99	MF	(India) IND	Muktasana Sharma	0	0	0	0	0	0
Forwards
9	FW	(Australia) AUS	Jordan Murray	19	7	19	7	0	0
16	FW	(India) IND	Nongdamba Naorem	3	0	3	0	0	0
17	FW	(India) IND	Rahul KP	17	3	17	3	0	0
48	FW	(India) IND	Subha Ghosh	0	0	0	0	0	0
88	FW	(England) ENG	Gary Hooper	18	5	18	5	0	0

=== Squad statistics ===
	League	Cup	Total
Games Played	20	0	20
Games Won	3	0	3
Games Drawn	8	0	8
Games Lost	9	0	9
Goals Scored	23	0	23
Goals conceded	36	0	36
Goal Difference	-13	0	-13
Clean Sheets	3	0	3
Goals by Substitutes	3	0	3
Yellow Cards	34	0	34
Red Cards	2	0	2

Players Used: 26

=== Goalscorers ===
Rank	No.	Pos.	Nation	Name	League	Cup	Total
1	9	FW	(Australia)	Jordan Murray	7	0	7
2	88	FW	(England)	Gary Hooper	5	0	5
3	17	FW	(India)	Rahul Praveen	3	0	3
4	26	DF	(Zimbabwe)	Costa Nhamoinesu	2	0	2
4	25	MF	(Spain)	Vicente Gómez	2	0	2
5	24	DF	(India)	Abdul Hakku	1	0	1
5	22	MF	(Spain)	Sergio Cidoncha	1	0	1
5	15	MF	(India)	Jeakson Singh	1	0	1
5	47	MF	(India)	Puitea	1	0	1
TOTAL					23	0	23

=== Assists ===
Rank	No.	Pos.	Nation	Name	League	Cup	Total Assists
1	88	FW	(England)	Gary Hooper	4	0	4
2	10	MF	(Argentina)	Facundo Pereyra	3	0	3
2	18	MF	(India)	Sahal Samad	3	0	3
3	7	MF	(India)	Seityasen Singh	1	0	1
3	5	DF	(India)	Nishu Kumar	1	0	1
3	25	MF	(Spain)	Vicente Gomez	1	0	1
3	9	FW	(Australia)	Jordan Murray	1	0	1
3	32	GK	(India)	Albino Gomes	1	0	1
3	3	DF	(India)	Sandeep Singh	1	0	1

=== Clean sheets ===
Rank	No.	Nation	Name	League	Cup	Total
1	42	(India)	Albino Gomes	3	0	3

=== Disciplinary record ===
No.	Pos.	Nation	Name	League			Cup			Total		
No.	Pos.	Nation	Name	Yellow card	Second yellow card	Red card	Yellow card	Second yellow card	Red card	Yellow card	Second yellow card	Red card
18	MF	(India)	Sahal Abdul Samad	3	0	0	0	0	0	3	0	0
10	MF	(Argentina)	Facundo Pereyra	2	0	0	0	0	0	2	0	0
7	MF	(India)	Seityasen Singh	1	0	0	0	0	0	1	0	0
8	MF	(India)	Rohit Kumar	2	0	0	0	0	0	2	0	0
20	MF	(Spain)	Sergio Cidoncha	1	0	0	0	0	0	1	0	0
4	DF	(Burkina Faso)	Bakary Koné	2	0	0	0	0	0	2	0	0
6	MF	(India)	K Prasanth	1	0	0	0	0	0	1	0	0
26	DF	(Zimbabwe)	Costa Nhamoinesu	3	1	0	0	0	0	3	1	0
17	FW	(India)	Rahul K. P.	5	0	0	0	0	0	5	0	0
5	DF	(India)	Nishu Kumar	1	0	0	0	0	0	1	0	0
39	DF	(India)	Lalruatthara	1	1	0	0	0	0	1	1	0
3	DF	(India)	Sandeep Singh	4	0	0	0	0	0	4	0	0
15	MF	(India)	Jeakson Singh	4	0	0	0	0	0	4	0	0
88	FW	(England)	Gary Hooper	1	0	0	0	0	0	1	0	0
31	MF	(Spain)	Juande	1	0	0	0	0	0	1	0	0
42	GK	(India)	Albino Gomes	1	0	0	0	0	0	1	0	0
9	FW	(Australia)	Jordan Murray	1	0	0	0	0	0	1	0	0

== See also ==
- 2020–21 Indian Super League
- Indian Super League
- Kerala Blasters FC
- List of Kerala Blasters FC seasons
