= 2019–20 Kerala Blasters FC season =

6th season in existence of Kerala Blasters FC

Kerala Blasters
2019–20 season
- CEO: Viren D' Silva
- Head Coach: Eelco Schattorie
- Stadium: Jawaharlal Nehru Stadium, Kochi, Kerala
- Indian Super League: 7th
- Super Cup: Tournament Suspended
- Top goalscorer: League: Bartholomew Ogbeche (15 goals); All: Bartholomew Ogbeche (15 goals)
- Highest home attendance: 36,298; Kerala Blasters 2–1 ATK (20 October 2019)
- Lowest home attendance: 7,754; Kerala Blasters 2–1 Bengaluru (15 February 2020)
- Average home league attendance: 17,500
Home colours	Away colours	Third colours

The 2019–20 season was the sixth season in Kerala Blasters FC's existence, as well as their sixth season in Indian Super League.

== Review and events ==
=== Indian Super League ===
Kerala Blasters started their 2019–20 Hero Indian Super League campaign with 2 consecutive home matches. They managed to come back for a 2–1 victory over ATK in the inaugural match, but lost against Mumbai City in very next match by conceding a late goal.

They continued their winless run after the first match, by losing their first away match of the season against Hyderabad FC after took lead and a goal less draw against Odisha FC. In this match, most of the time they played with 6 local players and only 2 foreign players because of injuries. During the international break after the match, they signed Vlatko Drobarov as a replacement for injured Jairo Rodrigues.

Kerala Blasters managed to climb to 6th position on the table after winning by their highest margin till the date of 5–1 against Hyderabad FC. They also defeated their rivals Bengaluru FC and ATK. Their last match in the season was against Odisha FC which ended in 4-4. This was the highest scoring match in the history of ISL till that date. Finally, the Blasters ended their season by finishing in 7th place in the table.

== Players ==
=== First-team squad ===
As of 2 December 2019

Note: Flags indicate national team as defined under FIFA eligibility rules; some limited exceptions apply. Players may hold more than one non-FIFA nationality.

No.	Pos.	Nation	Player
1	GK	IND	Bilal Khan
2	DF	IND	Mohammad Rakip
3	DF	BRA	Jairo Rodrigues (Injured)
5	DF	IND	Raju Gaikwad
6	MF	ESP	Mario Arqués
7	MF	SEN	Moustapha Gning
8	MF	IND	Seityasen Singh
10	FW	NGR	Bartholomew Ogbeche (captain)
11	MF	IND	Prashanth K
13	GK	IND	Rehenesh TP
14	DF	IND	Jessel Carneiro
15	MF	IND	Darren Caldeira
17	MF	IND	Rahul KP
18	MF	IND	Sahal Abdul Samad

No.	Pos.	Nation	Player
19	MF	IND	Halicharan Narzary
20	FW	IND	Mohammad Rafi
21	DF	IND	Sandesh Jhingan (Injured)
22	MF	ESP	Sergio Cidoncha (vice-captain)
23	DF	IND	Pritam Singh
24	DF	IND	Abdul Hakku
27	MF	IND	Samuel Lalmuanpuia
28	FW	CMR	Raphaël Messi Bouli
33	DF	MKD	Vlatko Drobarov
39	DF	IND	Lalruatthara
42	GK	IND	Shibinraj Kunniyil
51	DF	NED	Gianni Zuiverloon (third-captain)
55	MF	IND	Jeakson Singh

== Transfers ==
=== Transfers in ===
Entry date	Position	No.	Player	From club	Fee	Ref.
1 May 2019	MF	40	(India) Zayed Bin Waleed	Free agent	None	
29 May 2019	MF	6	(Spain) Mario Arqués	(India) Jamshedpur FC	None	
1 June 2019	FW	10	(Nigeria) Bartholomew Ogbeche	(India) NorthEast United	None	
1 June 2019	MF	17	(India) Rahul KP	(India) Indian Arrows	None	
12 June 2019	MF	22	(Spain) Sergio Cidoncha	(India) Jamshedpur FC	None	
1 July 2019	DF	51	(Netherlands) Gianni Zuiverloon	(India) Delhi Dynamos	None	
3 July 2019	GK	42	(India) Shibinraj Kunniyil	(India) Gokulam Kerala	Undisclosed	
10 July 2019	GK	1	(India) Bilal Khan	(India) Real Kashmir	None	
17 July 2019	MF	7	(Senegal) Moustapha Gning	(Spain) SD Ejea	None	
24 July 2019	GK	13	(India) Rehenesh TP	(India) NorthEast United	None	
31 July 2019	MF	30	(India) Arjun Jayaraj	(India) Gokulam Kerala	Undisclosed	
7 August 2019	MF	15	(India) Darren Caldeira	(India) Mohun Bagan A.C.	None	
14 August 2019	DF	14	(India) Jessel Carneiro	(India) Dempo S.C.	None	
17 August 2019	MF	8	(India) Seityasen Singh	(India) NorthEast United	None	
21 August 2019	DF	3	(Brazil) Jairo Rodrigues	(Indonesia) Persela Lamongan	None	
24 August 2019	FW	28	(Cameroon) Raphaël Messi Bouli	(Iran) Foolad F.C.	None	
28 August 2019	FW	20	(India) Mohammad Rafi	(India) Chennaiyin	None	
2 September 2019	MF	23	(India) Samuel Lalmuanpuia	(India) Shillong Lajong	None	
18 October 2019	DF	4	(India) Raju Gaikwad	(India) Jamshedpur	None	
22 November 2019	DF	9	(North Macedonia) Vlatko Drobarov	(North Macedonia) Belasica	None	

=== Loan return ===
Position	No.	Player	From club
MF	19	(India) Halicharan Narzary	(India) Chennaiyin FC
MF	55	(India) Jeakson Singh	(India) Indian Arrows
FW	13	(India) C. K. Vineeth	(India) Chennaiyin FC

=== Transfers Out ===
Exit date	Position	No.	Player	To club	Fee	Ref.
1 March 2019	DM	7	(France) Cyril Kali	(Greece) Panserraikos F.C.	Released	
1 March 2019	DM	6	(Serbia) Nikola Krcmarevic	Kerala Blasters (B)	Released	
1 March 2019	DF	4	(Serbia) Nemanja Lakić-Pešić	(Serbia) FK Voždovac	Released	
1 March 2019	MF	99	(Ghana) Courage Pekuson	Kerala Blasters (B)	Released	
1 March 2019	MF	8	(Serbia) Slaviša Stojanović	Kerala Blasters (B)	None	
1 March 2019	MF	17	(Uganda) Kizito Keziron	(Uganda) KCCA FC	Released	
1 June 2019	MF	9	(India) Seiminlen Doungel	(India) Goa	None	
9 June 2019	GK	1	(India) Dheeraj Singh Moirangthem	(India) ATK	None	
1 July 2019	DF	15	(India) Anas Edathodika	(India) ATK	None	
17 July 2019	MF	22	(India) Zakeer Mundampara	—	Released	
26 August 2019	FW	13	(India) C.K. Vineeth	(India) Jamshedpur	Released	
2 September 2019	MF	45	(India) Deependra Negi	(India) Hyderabad	Released	

=== Loans out ===
Start date	End date	Position	No.	Player	To club	Fee	Ref.
25 August 2018	End of season	FW	—	(India) Shaiborlang Kharpan	(India) Ozone FC	None	–
25 June 2019	End of season	MF	—	(India) Nongdamba Naorem	(India) Mohun Bagan	None	–
31 July 2019	End of season	FW	10	(Slovenia) Matej Poplatnik	(Hungary) Kaposvári Rákóczi FC	None	

== Pre-season and friendlies ==
Win Draw Loss Cancelled

The Kerala Blasters traveled to the United Arab Emirates (UAE) for their pre-season tour ahead of the new season. There, the club was set to play friendlies with top division UAE Pro League club.

The team traveled to UAE on September 4 and played one game vs Dibba Al-Fujairah. The event organisers Michi Sports did not provide the club with proper training and other facilities in the UAE, so the club decided to pull out of the tour.

The club was scheduled to face Ajman Club on 12 September, Emirates Club on 20 September and finally Al-Nasr on the 27th. But all the three games were cancelled. The club returned to India on 11 September and had a preseason at home training facility.

Kerala Blasters restarted their preseason on their home training facility turf at the Panampilly Nagar Ground. The club faced I-League 2nd Division club South United, I-League club Real Kashmir FC and they also faced the Kerala Santhosh Trophy team, the Kerala State Football Team. The Blasters even had a preseason game against their own reserve side, the Kerala Blasters (B). They Finished their preseason with a draw against Indian Arrows.

6 September 2019 Friendly	(United Arab Emirates) Dibba Al-Fujairah	0–0	(India) Kerala Blasters	Al Mamzar, Dubai, UAE
19:30(7:30) IST		Report		Stadium: Maktoum Bin Rashid Stadium

12 September 2019 Friendly	(United Arab Emirates) Ajman	–	(India) Kerala Blasters	Ajman, UAE
19:30(7:30) IST		Match Cancelled		Stadium: Ajman Stadium

20 September 2019 Friendly	(United Arab Emirates) Emirates	–	(India) Kerala Blasters	Ras Al-Khaimah, UAE
19:30(7:30) IST		Match Cancelled		Stadium: Emirates Club Stadium

22 September 2019 Friendly	(India) Kerala Blasters	3–1	(India) South United	Kochi, Kerala, India
16:30(4:30) IST	Narzary 60'; Samuel 69'; Zuiverloon 79'	Report	Magesh Selva(pen.) 30'	Stadium: Panampilly Ground

27 September 2019 Friendly	(United Arab Emirates) Al-Nasr	v	(India) Kerala Blasters	Dubai, UAE
19:30(7:30) IST		Match Cancelled		Stadium: Maktoum Stadium

28 September 2019 Friendly	(India) Kerala Blasters	0–1	(India) Real Kashmir	Kochi, Kerala, India
18:30(6:30) IST		Report	Krizo	Stadium: Panampilly Ground

3 October 2019 Friendly	(India) Kerala Blasters	3–2	(India) Kerala State Football Team	Kochi, Kerala, India
18:30(6:30) IST	Ogbeche; Cido; Messi	Report	Emil; Mousif	Stadium: Panampilly Ground

8 October 2019 Friendly	(India) Kerala Blasters	4–1	(India) Kerala Blasters(B)	Kochi, Kerala, India
17:30(5:30) IST	Ogbeche; Gning	Report	Messi	Stadium: Panampilly Ground

13 October 2019 Friendly	(India) Kerala Blasters	1–1	(India) Indian Arrows	Kochi, Kerala, India
18:30(6:30) IST	Messi		Amarjit	Stadium: Jawaharlal Nehru Stadium

== Competitions ==
Win Draw Loss

Competition	First match	Last match	Starting round	Record							
Competition	First match	Last match	Starting round	Pld	W	D	L	GF	GA	GD	Win %
ISL	20 October 2019	23 February 2020	Matchday 1	18	4	7	7	29	32	−3	22.22
Others				0	0	0	0	0	0	+0	—
Total				18	4	7	7	29	32	−3	22.22

Last updated: 16 March 2020.
Source: Competitions

=== Indian Super League ===
==== Standings ====
Pos	Team	Pld	W	D	L	GF	GA	GD	Pts
5	Mumbai City	18	7	5	6	25	29	−4	26
6	Odisha	18	7	4	7	28	31	−3	25
7	Kerala Blasters	18	4	7	7	29	32	−3	19
8	Jamshedpur	18	4	6	8	22	35	−13	18
9	NorthEast United	18	2	8	8	16	30	−14	14

Source: Indian Super League
Rules for classification: 1) points; 2) head-to-head points; 3) head-to-head goal difference; 4) head-to-head goals scored; 5) goal difference; 5) number of goals scored; 6) fair play ranking; 6) drawing of lots

==== Results summary ====
Overall								Home						Away					
Pld	W	D	L	GF	GA	GD	Pts	W	D	L	GF	GA	GD	W	D	L	GF	GA	GD
18	4	7	7	29	32	−3	19	3	5	2	17	15	+2	1	2	5	12	17	−5

Last updated: 16 March 2020.
Source: Matchday

==== League Results by round ====
Round	1	2	3	4	5	6	7	8	9	10	11	12	13	14	15	16	17	18
Ground	H	H	A	H	A	H	A	H	A	H	H	A	A	A	H	A	H	A
Result	W	L	L	D	L	D	D	D	L	D	W	W	L	L	L	D	W	D
Position	1	6	8	6	9	8	8	8	9	9	7	6	8	8	8	8	7	7

Updated to match(es) played on 16 March 2020. Source: Matchday
A = Away; H = Home; W = Win; D = Draw; L = Loss

==== Matchday ====
20 October 2019 1	Kerala Blasters	2–1	ATK	Kochi
19:30 IST (UTC+05:30)	Ogbeche 30' (pen.) 45'; Rodrigues (yellow card) 18'; Gnig (yellow card) 90'	Report	McHugh 6'; Rane (yellow card) 15'; Hernández (yellow card) 70'; Agus (yellow card) 88'	Stadium: Jawaharlal Nehru Stadium; Attendance: 36,298; Referee: Srikrishna; Man of the Match: Ogbeche (Kerala)

24 October 2019 2	Kerala Blasters	0–1	Mumbai City	Kochi
19:30 IST (UTC+05:30)	Gnig (yellow card) 45'; Rodrigues (yellow card) 64'	Report	Grgic (yellow card) 40'; Golui (yellow card) 61'; Chermiti 82'	Stadium: Jawaharlal Nehru Stadium; Attendance: 28,445; Referee: L Ajithkumar Metei; Man of the Match: Chermiti (Mumbai)

2 November 2019 3	Hyderabad	2–1	Kerala Blasters	Hyderabad
19:30 IST (UTC+05:30)	Halder (yellow card) 45+1'; Stanković 54' (pen.) (yellow card) 65'; Gurtej (yellow card) 78'; Marcelinho 81' (yellow card) 83'	Report	Rahul 34'; Gning (yellow card) 80'; Rodrigues (yellow card) 90+1'	Stadium: G. M. C. Balayogi Athletic Stadium; Attendance: 12,114; Referee: R Venkatesh; Man of the Match: Marcelinho (Hyderabad)

8 November 2019 4	Kerala Blasters	0–0	Odisha	Kochi
19:30 IST (UTC+05:30)		Report		Stadium: Jawaharlal Nehru Stadium; Attendance: 20,107; Referee: Srikrishna; Man of the Match: Cido (Kerala)

23 November 2019 5	Bengaluru	1–0	Kerala Blasters	Bangalore
19:30 IST (UTC+05:30)	Khabra (yellow card) 53'; Chhetri 55'	Report	Rakip (yellow card) 34'; Hakku (yellow card) 54'; Messi (yellow card) 66'; Sahal (yellow card) 72'	Stadium: Sree Kanteerava Stadium; Attendance: 27,083; Referee: Ranjit Bakshi; Man of the Match: Chhetri (Bengaluru)

1 December 2019 6	Kerala Blasters	2–2	Goa	Kochi
19:30 IST (UTC+05:30)	Cidoncha 2' (yellow card) 69'; Drobarov (yellow card) 40'; Messi 59'	Report	Fall 41' (red card) 52'; Fernandes (yellow card) 45'; Bedia (yellow card) 62'; Rodrigues 90+2'	Stadium: Jawaharlal Nehru Stadium; Attendance: 21,157; Referee: Crystal John; Man of the Match: Rodrigues (Goa)

5 December 2019 7	Mumbai City	1–1	Kerala Blasters	Mumbai
19:30 IST (UTC+05:30)	Fernandes (yellow card) 24'; Borges (yellow card) 44'; Chermiti 77'	Report	Drobarov (yellow card) 19'; Messi 75'	Stadium: Mumbai Football Arena; Attendance: 6,327; Referee: L Ajithkumar Metei; Man of the Match: Jeakson (Kerala)

13 December 2019 8	Kerala Blasters	2–2	Jamshedpur	Kochi
19:30 IST (UTC+05:30)	Jeakson (yellow card) 5'; Messi (yellow card) 54' (goal) 75', 87' (pen.)	Report	Passi (yellow card) 27'; Piti 38' (pen.); Vineeth 71'	Stadium: Jawaharlal Nehru Stadium; Attendance: 12,772; Referee: Turki Alkhudhayr; Man of the Match: Messi (Kerala)

20 December 2019 9	Chennaiyin	3–1	Kerala Blasters	Chennai
19:30 IST (UTC+05:30)	Schembri 4'; Chhangte 30'; Valskis 40'; Singh (yellow card) 44'; Sabiá (yellow card) 52' (yellow-red card) 90+3'; Kaith (yellow card) 83'	Report	Ogbeche 15' (yellow card) 37'	Stadium: Jawaharlal Nehru Stadium; Attendance: 11,597; Referee: Om Prakash Thakur; Man of the Match: Chhangte (Chennaiyin)

28 December 2019 10	Kerala Blasters	1–1	Northeast United	Kochi
19:30 IST (UTC+05:30)	Seityasen (yellow card) 38'; Ogbeche 43' (pen.); Gaikwad (yellow card) 45'; Jessel (yellow card) 52'	Report	Subhasish Roy (yellow card) 42'; Gyan 50' (pen.) (yellow card) 53'; Lalengmawia (yellow card) 62'	Stadium: Jawaharlal Nehru Stadium; Attendance: 12,168; Referee: Rahul Kumar Gupta; Man of the Match: Arques (Kerala)

5 January 2020 11	Kerala Blasters	5–1	Hyderabad	Kochi
19:30 IST (UTC+05:30)	Ogbeche 33' 74'; Drobarov 39'; Messi 45' (yellow card) 45+'; Zuiverloon (yellow card) 58'; Seityasen 59'; Sahal (yellow card) 88'	Report	Bobô 15'; Stankovic (yellow card) 44'; Abhishek Halder (yellow card) 62'	Stadium: Jawaharlal Nehru Stadium; Attendance: 9,856; Referee: Crystal John; Man of the Match: Ogbeche (Kerala)

12 January 2020 12	ATK	0–1	Kerala Blasters	Kolkata
19:30 IST (UTC+05:30)	Javi (yellow card) 39'; Mandi (yellow card) 89'	Report	Arqués (yellow card) 34'; Narzary 70'; Prasanth (yellow card) 90'; Drobarov (yellow card) 90+'	Stadium: Salt Lake Stadium; Attendance: 22336; Referee: L Ajithkumar Metei; Man of the Match: Narzary (Kerala)

19 January 2020 13	Jamshedpur	3–2	Kerala Blasters	Jamshedpur
19:30 IST (UTC+05:30)	Joyner (yellow card) 1'; Acosta 39' (yellow card) 78'; Castel 75' (pen.); Ogbeche 87' (o.g.)		Messi 8'; Hakku (yellow card) 31' (yellow-red card) 50'; Ogbeche (yellow card) 45' (goal) 56'	Stadium: JRD Tata Sports Complex; Attendance: 18,753; Referee: Crystal John; Man of the Match: Castel (Jamshedpur)

26 January 2020 14	Goa	3–2	Kerala Blasters	Goa
19:30 IST (UTC+05:30)	Boumous 26' 83' (yellow card) 85'; Jackichand 45'; Brandon (yellow card) 83'; Jahouh (yellow card) 88'		Drobarov (yellow card) 24'; Messi 53'; Gning (yellow card) 64'; Ogbeche 69'; Cidoncha (yellow card) 82'	Stadium: Fatorda Stadium; Attendance: 12,317; Referee: L Ajithkumar Metei; Man of the Match: Boumous (Goa)

1 February 2020 15	Kerala Blasters	3–6	Chennaiyin	Kochi
19:30 IST (UTC+05:30)	Gaikwad (yellow card) 41'; Ogbeche 48' 55' 76'; Messi (yellow card) 57'		Crivellaro 39' 45'; Valskis 45' 90'; Thapa (yellow card) 57'; Chhangte 59' 80'	Stadium: Jawaharlal Nehru Stadium; Attendance: 9084; Referee: Umesh Bora; Man of the Match: Chhangte (Chennai)

9 February 2020 16	Kerala Blasters	0–0	Northeast United	Guwahati
19:30 IST (UTC+05:30)	Ogbeche (yellow card) 35'; Gning (yellow card) 90'		Milan (yellow card) 12'; Pradhan (yellow card) 21'; Vaz (yellow card) 44'; Gallego (yellow card) 81'	Stadium: Indira Gandhi Athletic Stadium; Attendance: 1,000; Referee: Ranjit Bakshi; Man of the Match: Lalengmawia (NorthEast)

15 February 2020 17	Kerala Blasters	2–1	Bengaluru	Kochi
19:30 IST (UTC+05:30)	Messi (yellow card) 29'; Lalruatthara (yellow card) 36'; Ogbeche 45' 72' (pen.); Rahul (yellow card) 85'; Bilal (yellow card) 90'; Drobarov (yellow card) 90+'		Brown 16' (yellow card) 42'; Serrán (yellow card) 45+'	Stadium: Jawaharlal Nehru Stadium; Attendance: 7754; Referee: L Ajithkumar Metei; Man of the Match: Ogbeche (Kerala)

23 February 2020 18	Odisha	4–4	Kerala Blasters	Bhuvaneshwar
19:30 IST (UTC+05:30)	Onwu 2' 37' 57' (yellow card) 81'; Das (yellow card) 16'; Guedes 44' (pen.) (yellow card) 53'; Bora (yellow card) 84'; Dorronsoro (yellow card) 90'; Tébar (yellow card) 90+'		Das 6' (o.g.); Messi 28'; Lalruatthara (yellow card) 45'; Bilal (yellow card) 50'; Ogbeche 82' (pen.) 90' (pen.); Jessel (yellow card) 85'	Stadium: Kalinga Stadium; Attendance: 6234; Referee: Tejas Nagvenkar; Man of the Match: Onwu (Odisha)

== Statistics ==
As of 17 March 2020.

=== Squad appearances and goals ===
No.	Pos	Nat	Player	Total		Super League		Others	
No.	Pos	Nat	Player	Apps	Goals	Apps	Goals	Apps	Goals
Goalkeepers
1	GK	(India) IND	Bilal Khan	5	0	5	0	0	0
13	GK	(India) IND	TP Rehenesh	13	0	13	0	0	0
42	GK	(India) IND	Shibin Raj Kunniyil	0	0	0	0	0	0
Defenders
2	DF	(India) IND	Mohammad Rakip	15	0	15	0	0	0
3	DF	(Brazil) BRA	Jairo Rodrigues	4	0	4	0	0	0
14	DF	(India) IND	Jessel Carneiro	18	0	18	0	0	0
4	DF	(India) IND	Raju Gaikwad	12	0	12	0	0	0
23	DF	(India) IND	Pritam Singh	0	0	0	0	0	0
24	DF	(India) IND	Abdul Hakku	11	0	11	0	0	0
33	DF	(North Macedonia) MKD	Vlatko Drobarov	13	1	13	1	0	0
39	DF	(India) IND	Lalruatthara	3	0	3	0	0	0
51	DF	(Netherlands) NED	Gianni Zuiverloon	8	0	8	0	0	0
Midfielders
6	MF	(Spain) ESP	Mario Arques	6	0	6	0	0	0
7	MF	(Senegal) SEN	Moustapha Gning	13	0	13	0	0	0
8	MF	(India) IND	Seityasen Singh	10	1	10	1	0	0
11	MF	(India) IND	Prashanth K	12	0	12	0	0	0
15	MF	(India) IND	Darren Caldeira	1	0	1	0	0	0
17	MF	(India) IND	Rahul KP	8	1	8	1	0	0
18	MF	(India) IND	Sahal Abdul Samad	18	0	18	0	0	0
19	MF	(India) IND	Halicharan Narzary	14	1	14	1	0	0
22	MF	(Spain) ESP	Sergio Cidoncha	13	1	13	1	0	0
27	MF	(India) IND	Samuel Lalmuanpuia	5	0	5	0	0	0
55	MF	(India) IND	Jeakson Singh	13	0	13	0	0	0
Forwards
10	FW	(Nigeria) NGR	Bartholomew Ogbeche	16	15	16	15	0	0
20	FW	(India) IND	Mohammad Rafi	7	0	7	0	0	0
28	FW	(Cameroon) CMR	Raphaël Messi Bouli	17	8	17	8	0	0

=== Squad statistics ===
	League	Others	Total
Games Played	18	0	18
Games Won	4	0	4
Games Drawn	7	0	7
Games Lost	7	0	7
Goals Scored	29	0	29
Goals conceded	32	0	32
Goal Difference	-3	0	-3
Clean Sheets	3	0	3
Goals by Substitutes	0	0	0
Yellow Cards	41	0	41
Red Cards	1	0	1

Players Used: Kerala Blasters has used a total of 24 different players in all competitions.

=== Goalscorers ===
Rank	No.	Pos.	Nation	Name	League	Others	Total
1	10	FW	(Nigeria)	Bartholomew Ogbeche	15	0	15
2	28	FW	(Cameroon)	Raphaël Messi Bouli	8	0	8
3	19	MF	(India)	Halicharan Narzary	1	0	1
3	17	MF	(India)	Rahul KP	1	0	1
3	8	MF	(India)	Seityasen Singh	1	0	1
3	22	MF	(Spain)	Sergio Cidoncha	1	0	1
3	33	DF	(North Macedonia)	Vlatko Drobarov	1	0	1
Own Goals					1	0	1
TOTAL					29	0	29

=== Assists ===
Note: This list features only the top 5 players with most assists in the season

Rank	Pos.	Nation	Name	League	Others	Total Appearance	Total Assists
1	DF	(India)	Jessel Carneiro	5	0	18	5
2	MF	(Spain)	Sergio Cidoncha	3	0	13	3
3	DF	(Netherlands)	Gianni Zuiverloon	2	0	8	2
4	MF	(India)	Halicharan Narzary	2	0	14	2
5	MF	(India)	Sahal Samad	2	0	18	2

=== Clean sheets ===
No.	Nation	Name	League	Others	Total Clean Sheets	Games played
1	(India)	Bilal Khan	1	0	1	5
13	(India)	Rehenesh TP	2	0	2	13
TOTAL			3	0	3	18

=== Disciplinary record ===
No.	Pos.	Nation	Name	League			Others			Total		
No.	Pos.	Nation	Name	Yellow card	Second yellow card	Red card	Yellow card	Second yellow card	Red card	Yellow card	Second yellow card	Red card
3	DF	(Brazil)	Jairo Rodrigues	3	0	0	0	0	0	3	0	0
7	MF	(Senegal)	Moustapha Gning	5	0	0	0	0	0	5	0	0
2	DF	(India)	Mohammad Rakip	1	0	0	0	0	0	1	0	0
24	DF	(India)	Abdul Hakku	1	1	0	0	0	0	1	1	0
28	FW	(Cameroon)	Messi Bouli	5	0	0	0	0	0	5	0	0
18	MF	(India)	Sahal Samad	2	0	0	0	0	0	2	0	0
33	DF	(North Macedonia)	Vlatko Drobarov	5	0	0	0	0	0	5	0	0
22	MF	(Spain)	Sergio Cidoncha	2	0	0	0	0	0	2	0	0
55	MF	(India)	Jeakson Singh	1	0	0	0	0	0	1	0	0
51	DF	(Netherlands)	Gianni Zuiverloon	1	0	0	0	0	0	1	0	0
6	MF	(Spain)	Mario Arques	1	0	0	0	0	0	1	0	0
8	MF	(India)	Seityasen Singh	1	0	0	0	0	0	1	0	0
5	DF	(India)	Raju Gaikwad	2	0	0	0	0	0	2	0	0
10	FW	(Nigeria)	Bartholomew Ogbeche	3	0	0	0	0	0	3	0	0
14	DF	(India)	Jessel Carneiro	2	0	0	0	0	0	2	0	0
11	MF	(India)	K Prasanth	1	0	0	0	0	0	1	0	0
39	DF	(India)	Lalruatthara	2	0	0	0	0	0	2	0	0
17	MF	(India)	Rahul KP	1	0	0	0	0	0	1	0	0
1	GK	(India)	Bilal Khan	2	0	0	0	0	0	2	0	0
TOTAL				41	1	0	0	0	0	41	1	0

== See also ==
- 2019–20 I-League 2nd Division
- 2019–20 Kerala Premier League
- 2019–20 in Indian football
- 2019–20 Indian Super League
- I-League 2nd Division
- Indian Super League
- Kerala Blasters FC Reserves
- Kerala Blasters FC
- Kerala Premier League
