= Sahal Abdul Samad =

Indian footballer (born 1996)

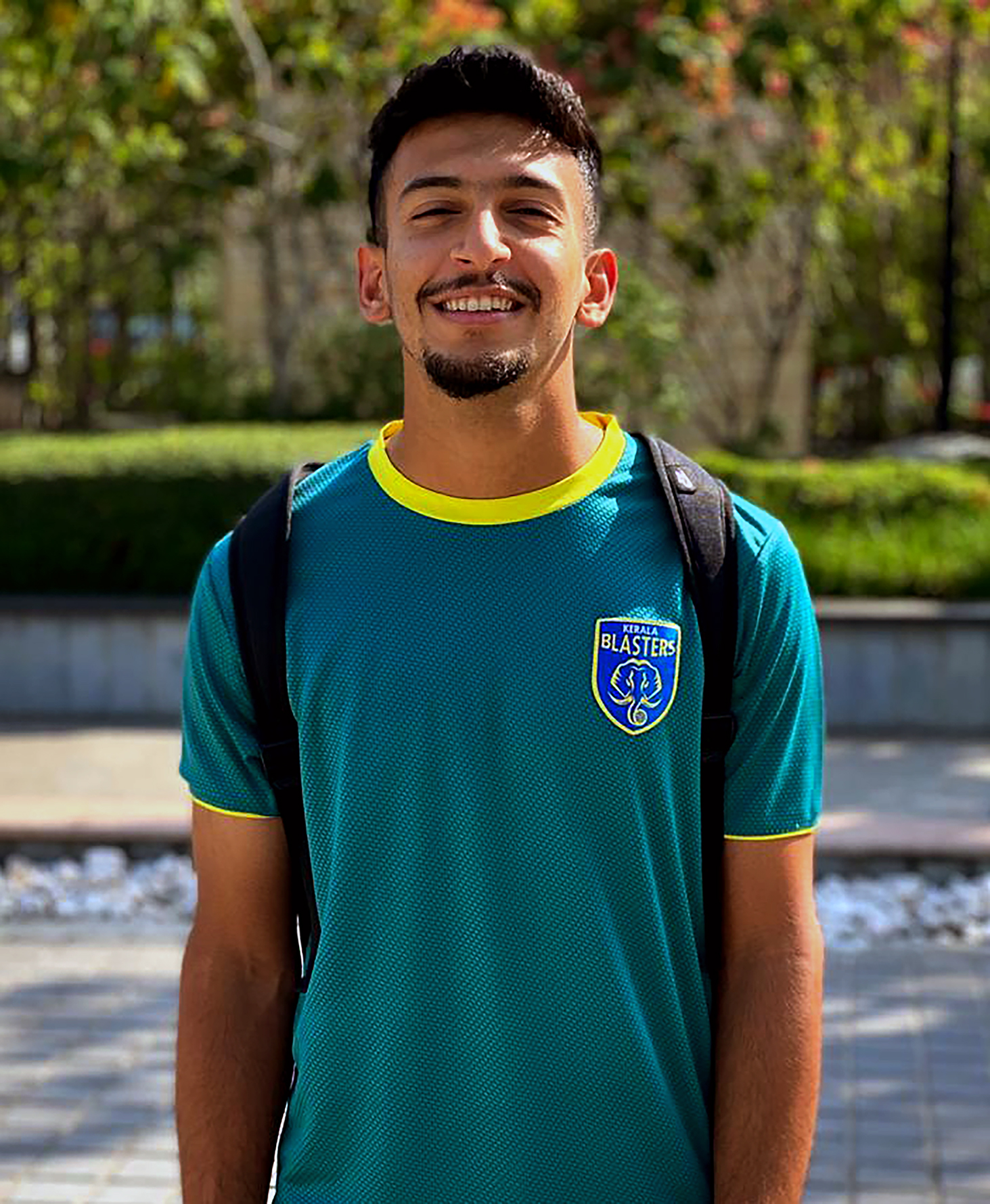
- Sahal with Kerala Blasters in 2018

Personal information
- Date of birth: 1 April 1997 (age 29)
- Place of birth: Al Ain, United Arab Emirates
- Height: 1.77 m (5 ft 10 in)
- Position: Attacking midfielder

Team information
- Current team: Mohun Bagan SG
- Number: 18

Youth career
- 2012–2016: Al-Ethihad Football Academy
- 2016–2017: Kerala

Senior career*
Years	Team	Apps	(Gls)
2017–2018	Kerala Blasters B	10	(7)
2018–2023	Kerala Blasters	92	(10)
2023–	Mohun Bagan	79	(13)

International career^{‡}
2019–2020	India U23	2	(0)
2019–	India	45	(3)
Medal record
Men's football
Representing India
SAFF Championship
Winner	2021 Maldives
Winner	2023 India
- * Club domestic league appearances and goals as of 17:30, 21 May 2026 (UTC) ‡ National team caps and goals as of 22:00, 6 October 2026 (UTC)

Sahal Abdul Samad (born 1 April 1997) is a professional footballer who plays as a midfielder for Indian Super League club Mohun Bagan. Born in the United Arab Emirates, he plays for the India national team.

== Club career ==
=== Early life and youth career ===
Sahal was born in Al Ain, UAE, to Malayali parents from Kerala, India and completed his 14 years of schooling at New Indian Model School in Al Ain. He started to play football at the age of eight. In 2010, Sahal joined the Al Ethihad Sports Academy to train in professional football. After completing his studies in UAE, he moved to Payyannur in Kannur, Kerala, India, to complete his degree and to play university football. A few months after starting his degree, he was spotted by a coach of SN College in Kannur, who persuaded him to switch colleges. After good performances at university-level tournaments, he joined the district Under-21 side, and then the Kerala team, to compete in the Santosh Trophy.

=== Kerala Blasters ===
==== 2017–2018: Kerala Blasters B and senior team debut ====
Sahal's performance in the 2017 Santosh Trophy was noted by scouts of Kerala Blasters, who signed him to his first ever professional contract and put him on the reserve side for the 2017–18 I-League 2nd Division. In the fourth match against FC Kerala, he was appointed as captain for the rest of the season. He scored seven goals from ten games and became third top-scorer in the league.

As the senior team was struggling with points in the 2017–18 Season of ISL, manager René Meulensteen decided to promote some youth players, including Sahal, to the senior team. Due to the team's poor performance, Rene was sacked after the match and David James took over for the rest of season. Sahal was not included in the squad for the next five matches but he was called up to side and remained as an unused substitute in next two matches.

Sahal debuted for the senior side as a substitute for the former Manchester United player Dimitar Berbatov in the 80th minute of a match against ATK on 8 February 2018, which ended in a draw. He was given another chance in the 90th minute of the match against Bengaluru.

==== 2018–2019: Breakthrough season ====
In the 2018–19 season, Sahal was included in the starting 11 of the season opener against ATK on 29 September 2018, which the Blasters won by 2–0. He played in 17 league games during the season, scored his first goal for the club against Chennaiyin on 15 February 2019. Sahal improved his passing capability and made 688 touches during the season. He was one among the top Indian players with most key passes in the season. Despite club's poor campaign in the 2018–19, Sahal enjoyed his breakthrough season and went on to win ISL Emerging Player of the Season. He was also announced as the "AIFF Emerging Player of the Year". On 11 May 2019, Sahal signed a contract extension with Kerala Blasters, which tied him to the club until 2022.

==== 2019–2021: Becoming the club's poster boy ====
Blasters appointed Eelco Schattorie as the manager in the 2019–20 ISL season. As the season progressed, the team's injury problem became so concerning, Sahal was mostly used as a winger and sometimes as a secondary striker. He started most matches at right-side of the midfield and provided two assists during the season.

Following Sandesh Jhingan's exit from Kerala Blasters in May 2020, Sahal replaced him as the club's poster boy. On 12 August 2020, despite the circulation of rumours about him leaving the club, Sahal committed himself to the Blasters, signing a contract until 2025.

On 20 December 2020, Sahal made his comeback from the quads injury, that had sidelined him for a month since his first match on November 20 in the 2020–21 Indian Super League. He came back as a substitute in the 46th minute and provided an important assist to Jeakson Singh who equalized in a 1–1 draw against East Bengal during the stoppage time. Since that match, Sahal was deployed as a winger by the new manager for the season Kibu Vicuña.

On 15 January 2021, Sahal won the Hero of the match award in the match against East Bengal which ended in a 1–1 draw. Sahal was once again awarded with the Hero of the match on 27 January 2021 in a 0–0 draw against Jamshedpur. Sahal created 28 chances in his 14 appearances and was second in the list among the Indian players to create most number of chances during the season.

==== 2021–2022: Ending the goalless streak ====
During the 2021 summer transfer window, ATK Mohun Bagan offered three senior players in exchange for Sahal. But the offer was rejected by Kerala Blasters. He was then included in the Kerala Blasters squad for the 2021 Durand Cup, and played his first match in the tournament against Delhi FC on 21 September 2021, which they lost 1–0. Sahal scored his second goal for the club against ATK Mohun Bagan on 19 November in the 2021–22 season opener, which ended in a 4–2 defeat for Kerala Blasters.

On 19 December, he scored against defending champions Mumbai City, which the Blasters 0–3 after Sahal opened the score-sheet in the 27th minute. Sahal scored again in the next match against rivals Chennaiyin on 22 December, where the Blasters won the game 0–3. He scored his fourth goal as well as his third consecutive goal in the season against Jamshedpur on 26 December, which they ended in 1–1 draw. He thus became the second Indian player after Sunil Chhetri to score in three consecutive Indian Super League matches.

Sahal scored his fifth goal of the season on 2 March 2022 against Mumbai City and helped the Blasters to defeat them 3–1. He scored the only goal for the Blasters in the first leg of the semi-final against Jamshedpur on 11 March, which they won 0–1. After the match, Sahal suffered an hamstring injury, which had him missed out from the Blasters' squad in the second leg of the semi-final and the final against Hyderabad FC.

At the end of the season, Sahal became the joint-second highest Indian goal-scorer in the league with six goals, sharing the record with Mumbai City's Bipin Singh. He was the leading Indian goalscorer for the Blasters in the season. He was appreciated by the media and pundits for his performance in the season.

==== 2022–2023: Final season and departure ====
In June 2022, Kerala Blasters sporting director Karolis Skinkys revealed that IBV Westmannaejar, that plays in the Icelandic top-tier league Besta-deild karla, were keen on signing Sahal on a short-term loan deal until the end of August. But the deal did not work out in the end due to difficult visa and work permit issues. "We also had an option to loan out Sahal to a Slovak club until the end of August. But the changes at that club did not allow this to happen"; said Skinkys.

On 5 November, Sahal surpassed Jhingan's record to reach a club record of 79 appearances, in which he also scored a brace in a 3–0 away win against NorthEast United FC. On 13 November, Sahal assisted Adrian Luna's opening goal against FC Goa helping in a 3–1 win, which was the first victory for the club against Goa since 2016. He scored his third goal of the season against the southern rivals Chennaiyin on 19 December, where he scored the opening goal of the night but the match ended in a 1–1 draw for both sides.

On 8 April 2023, Sahal assisted Nishu Kumar's second goal against RoundGlass Punjab in the first game of 2023 Indian Super Cup, helping in a 3–1 win, which was the first victory for the club in the Indian Super Cup. Sahal played his last match for the Blasters against Bengaluru FC in the Southern Derby on 16 April in the Super Cup as a substitute for Vibin Mohanan in the 90th minute, which ended in a 1–1 draw.

After making 97 appearances and scoring 10 goals and assisting 9 times across all competition for the Blasters over his six years at the club, Sahal left the Blasters for Mohun Bagan, after becoming the most-capped Blasters' player at the time of his departure.

=== Mohun Bagan Super Giant ===
On 14 July 2023, Kerala Blasters announced the transfer of Sahal to Mohun Bagan Super Giant for an undisclosed transfer fee and in exchange of a player. As per reports, Mohun Bagan approximately paid the Blasters a transfer fee of ₹90 lakhs and exchanged their captain Pritam Kotal to sign Sahal until 2028, making it one of the most expensive transfers in the history of Indian football. He scored a total of 2 goals for Mohun Bagan Super Giant with 14 appearances in the 2023–24 Indian Super League.

== International career ==
=== Youth ===
Sahal was named in India U23's squad for the 2020 AFC U-23 Championship Qualifiers. He made his debut with the under-23 team on 11 March 2019 against Qatar U23 in a friendly prior to the tournament.

=== Senior ===
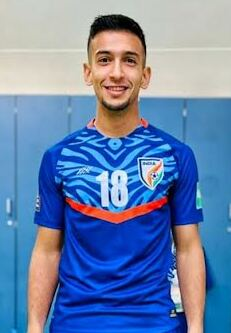
Samad in national team jersey.

Sahal was included in the preliminary squad of the Indian senior team in the 2019 AFC Asian Cup but did not make it into the final squad. In May 2019, he was named in the squad for 2019 King's Cup. Sahal made his debut for the Indian senior team on 5 June 2019 in a 3–1 loss against Curaçao in the 2019 King's Cup.

Sahal was named in the 23-men Indian squad for the 2021 SAFF Championship in Maldives. He scored his first international goal against Nepal on 16 October 2021 in a 3–0 victory in the final of the tournament after coming as a substitute in the 86th minute.

After an impressive 2021–22 season, Sahal made it to the squad for the 2023 AFC Asian Cup qualifiers. He scored his second international goal on 11 June 2022 against Afghanistan, where he came in as a substitute for Sunil Chhetri in the last moments of the regular time and scored the winning goal in the added time and helped India win the match 1–2 at full-time.

In May 2023, Sahal was included in the final squad for the 2023 Intercontinental Cup by the coach Igor Štimac. On 9 June 2023, he played his first match of the Intercontinental Cup by starting against Mongolia and scored the opening goal in the 2nd minute, as India won the match by the score of 2–0.

== Style of play ==
During his early days at the Blasters, Sahal mainly played as an attacking midfielder or central midfielder and was noted for his dribbling ability and creativity. Although Sahal initially played as an attacking midfielder, he was later moved to a winger role in the midfield. He has also been occasionally used as a defensive midfielder and even as a centre-forward. Sahal is considered as one of the best players in the Kerala Blasters' history. He is regarded as one of the best midfielders in India by many football pundits and fans.

== Personal life ==
Sahal was born on 1 April 1997, in Al Ain, UAE into a Malayali family which originally hails from Kavvayi, Payyanur in Kannur. He attended the New Indian Model School, Al Ain until 2015 and is an alumnus of the school. He pursued bachelor's degree from S. N. College, Kannur.

On 10 June 2020, Sahal signed a deal with German multinational sportwear company, Puma, as its new ambassador. In June 2020, Sahal auctioned his national team jersey, which he wore during the World Cup qualifiers. He donated the proceeds of the auction to Kerala Chief Minister's Distress Relief Fund to help prevention activities during the COVID-19 pandemic.

In September 2022, Sahal became the Indian ambassador of the global energy drink company, Predator Energy. In June 2022, Sahal got engaged to Reza Farhath, a state-level badminton player and married her in July 2023.

== Career statistics ==
=== Club ===
As of match played 8 October 2026

Appearances and goals by club, season and competition
Club	Season	League			National cup (Note: Includes Super Cup)		AFC		Durand Cup		Other(s)		Total	
Club	Season	Division	Apps	Goals	Apps	Goals	Apps	Goals	Apps	Goals	Apps	Goals	Apps	Goals
Kerala Blasters B	2017–18	I-League 2nd Division	10	7	0	0	—		—		—		10	7
Kerala Blasters B	Total		10	7	0	0	0	0	0	0	0	0	10	7
Kerala Blasters	2017–18	Indian Super League	2	0	0	0	—		—		—		2	0
Kerala Blasters	2018–19	Indian Super League	17	1	1	0	—		—		—		18	1
Kerala Blasters	2019–20	Indian Super League	18	0	—		—		—		—		18	0
Kerala Blasters	2020–21	Indian Super League	14	0	—		—		—		—		14	0
Kerala Blasters	2021–22	Indian Super League	21	6	—		—		1 (Note: Appearance(s) in Durand Cup)	0	—		22	6
Kerala Blasters	2022–23	Indian Super League	20	3	3	0	—		—		—		23	3
Kerala Blasters	Total		92	10	4	0	—		1	0	—		97	10
Mohun Bagan	2023–24	Indian Super League	15	2	0	0	7 (Note: Appearance(s) in AFC Cup)	1	4	0	—		26	3
Mohun Bagan	2024–25	Indian Super League	19	0	2	1	1 (Note: Appearance(s) in AFC Champions League Two)	0	4	1	—		26	2
Mohun Bagan	2025–26	Indian Super League	11	1	3	0	1	0	3	2	1 (Note: Appearance(s) in IFA Shield)	0	19	3
Mohun Bagan	2026–27	Indian Super League	0	0	0	0	—		6	5	7 (Note: 6 Appearance(s), 3 Goals in 2026 Calcutta Football League and 1 Appearance in 2026 IFA Shield)	3	13	8
Mohun Bagan	Total		45	3	5	1	9	1	17	8	8	3	84	16
Career total			147	20	9	1	9	1	18	8	8	3	191	33

=== International ===
As of 6 October 2026

National team	Year	Apps	Goals
India	2019	9	0
India	2021	5	1
India	2022	6	1
India	2023	15	1
India	2024	5	0
India	2025	2	0
India	2026	3	0
Total		45	3

==== International goals ====
As of 18 March 2025

List of international goals scored by Sahal Abdul Samad
No.	Date	Venue	Opponent	Score	Result	Competition	Ref.
1	16 October 2021	National Football Stadium, Malé, Maldives	Nepal	3–0	3–0	2021 SAFF Championship	
2	11 June 2022	Salt Lake Stadium, Kolkata, India	Afghanistan	2–1	2–1	2023 AFC Asian Cup qualification	
3	9 June 2023	Kalinga Stadium, Bhubaneshwar, India	Mongolia	1–0	2–0	2023 Intercontinental Cup	

== Honours ==
Mohun Bagan

- Indian Super League Shield: 2023–24, 2024–25
- Indian Super League Cup: 2024–2025
- Durand Cup: 2023
- IFA Shield: 2025, 2026
- Calcutta Football League: 2026

India

- SAFF Championship: 2021, 2023
- Tri-Nation Series: 2023
- Intercontinental Cup: 2023

Individual

- ISL Emerging Player of the Season: 2018–19
- AIFF Emerging Player of the Year: 2018–19

== See also ==
- List of India international footballers born outside India
