= Seityasen Singh Irom =

Indian footballer (born 1992)

Seityasen Singh
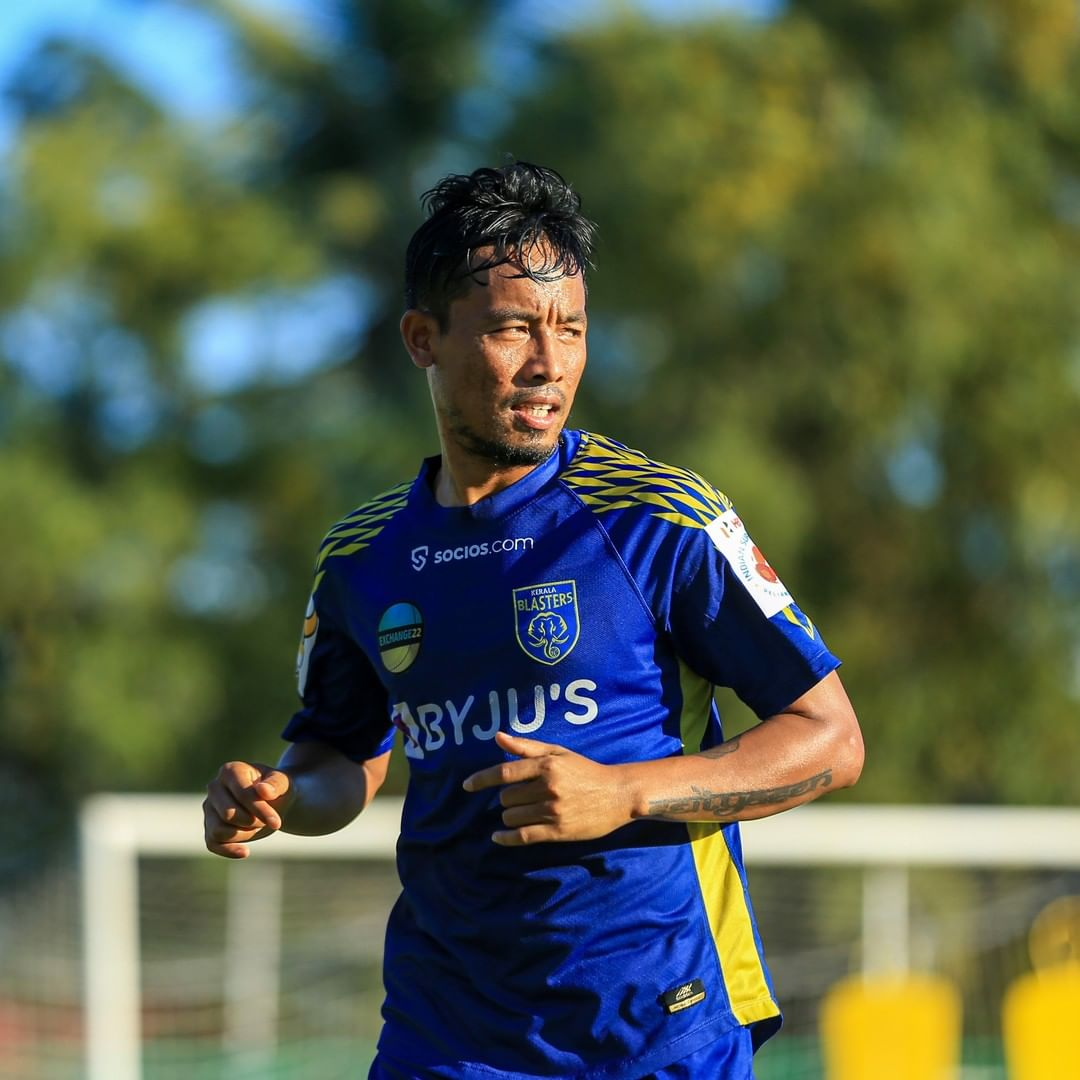
- Seityasen with Kerala Blasters in 2021

Personal information
- Full name: Seityasen Singh Irom
- Date of birth: 12 March 1992 (age 34)
- Place of birth: Manipur, India
- Height: 1.78 m (5 ft 10 in)
- Position: Winger

Senior career*
Years	Team	Apps	(Gls)
2011–2015	Royal Wahingdoh	18	(6)
2015	→ NorthEast United (loan)	6	(1)
2016	Salgaocar	8	(0)
2016	NorthEast United	9	(2)
2017	→ DSK Shivajians (loan)	10	(0)
2017–2018	Delhi Dynamos	12	(1)
2018–2019	NorthEast United	0	(0)
2019–2022	Kerala Blasters	25	(1)
2021–2022	→ Hyderabad (loan)	3	(0)
2024-2025	Southern Sporting Union	1	(0)
2025–	NEROCA	1	(0)

International career^{‡}
2015–2018	India	5	(0)
- * Club domestic league appearances and goals as of 19:55, 28 January 2025 (IST) ‡ National team caps and goals as of 16:42, 11 September 2021(UTC)

Seityasen Singh Irom (Meitei: Irom Seityasen Singh, born 12 March 1992) is an Indian professional footballer who plays as a winger for I-League 2 club NEROCA.

== Club career ==
=== Royal Wahingdoh ===
On 19 September 2011 Seityasen made his professional debut in the Federation Cup against Churchill Brothers for Royal Wahingdoh who were then in the I-League 2nd Division. The Royals created a major upset beating their fancied rivals 2–1 with Seityasen captaining Wahingdoh, and scoring the first goal. He was then an important part of Wahingdoh's 2011 I-League 2nd Division squad where they qualified for the final round but failed to qualify to the I-League in the final round. He then participated in the 2012 I-League 2nd Division for Wahingdoh, where he scored twice in the group stages thus helping his team qualify to the 2012 I-League 2nd Division final round again. In the final round, it is only known that Seityasen appeared 8 times scoring thrice, but could not help his side gain promotion. In the 2013 I-League 2nd Division, he scored thrice but could not help his team qualify for the final round in a disappointing season. Finally, during the 2014 I-League 2nd Division, he scored three times to help his team qualify for the I-League.

Seityasen played his first game of the new season in the Federation Cup against Mumbai in a 2–1 win. He would then make his I-League debut against Shillong Lajong and scored his first goal of the 2014-15 season from a Jackichand Singh assist in a match they won by 2–1 scoreline. On 27 January 2015, he scored the winner against Bharat FC in the 64th minute to give his side third win in a row. The young winger scored his first hat-trick in the I-League on 3 May 2015, when he netted thrice against Salgaocar F.C. in a match played in Shillong. Royal Wahingdoh won the tie 4–2.

==== NorthEast United (loan) ====
In July 2015, Seityasen Singh was auctioned to play for NorthEast United in the 2015 Indian Super League. Representing NorthEast United in the 2015 Indian Super League campaign, he was one of the 10 Indian players who were part of the auction. He picked up 4 Emerging Player of The Match Awards and received another National Team call-up for his excellent performances.

=== Salgaocar ===
On 7 January 2016, Salgaocar confirmed that they have signed Royal Wahingdoh's star winger Seityasen Singh for 1 year. On 24 January, Seityasen made his league debut, coming-on as 38th-minute substitute for Alesh Sawant in an away match against Mumbai FC at the Cooperage Stadium.

=== DSK Shivajians ===
On 1 January 2017, DSK Shivajians confirmed that they have signed NorthEast United's star winger Seityasen Singh sign for DSK Shivajians (loan).

=== NorthEast United ===
On June 30, 2017, NorthEast retained Seityasen for third season of Hero ISL from end of loan from DSK Shivajians.

=== Delhi Dynamos ===
On 23 July 2017, Delhi Dynamos FC confirmed that they have signed NorthEast United's star winger Seityasen Singh.

=== NorthEast United ===
On 1 July 2018, NorthEast United confirmed that they have signed Delhi Dynamos's winger Seityasen Singh.

=== Kerala Blasters FC ===
On 17 August 2019, Kerala Blasters confirmed that they have signed Seityasen Singh on a one-year deal. He made 10 appearances during the 2019-20 season of Indian Super League and scored his first goal for the club against Hyderabad FC.

In September 2020, it was confirmed that Seityasen has extended his contract with the Blasters till 2022.

Seityasen was included in the Kerala Blasters squad for the 2021 Durand Cup, where he appeared in all three matches for the club throughout the tournament. He played his first match of the 2021–22 Indian Super League season against defending champions Mumbai City FC on 19 November 2021 as a substitute for Álvaro Vázquez in the 83rd minute of the game which they won 0–3 at full-time.

==== Hyderabad FC (loan) ====
On 29 December, Kerala Blasters announced the loan departure of Seityasen to Hyderabad FC for the rest of the season.

== International career ==
On 11 June 2015, Singh made his debut for the India national football team in the 2018 FIFA World Cup qualifier against Oman.

== Career statistics ==
=== Club ===
As of matches played till 30 March 2022

Club	Season	League			Federation Cup		Durand Cup		AFC		Total	
Club	Season	Division	pps	Goals	Apps	Goals	Apps	Goals	Apps	Goals	Apps	Goals
Royal Wahingdoh	2014–15	I-League	18	6	4	0	0	0	–	–	22	6
NorthEast United	2015	Indian Super League	6	1	0	0	–	–	–	–	6	1
Salgaocar	2015–16	I-League	8	0	2	0	–	–	–	–	10	0
NorthEast United	2016	Indian Super League	9	2	0	0	–	–	–	–	9	2
DSK Shivajians	2017	I-League	10	0	0	0	–	–	–	–	10	0
Delhi Dynamos	2017–18	Indian Super League	11	1	0	0	–	–	–	–	11	1
Northeast United	2018–19	Indian Super League	0	0	0	0	–	–	–	–	0	0
Kerala Blasters	2019–20	Indian Super League	10	1	0	0	–	–	–	–	10	1
Kerala Blasters	2020–21	Indian Super League	12	0	0	0	–	–	–	–	12	0
Kerala Blasters	2021–22	Indian Super League	3	0	0	0	3	0	–	–	6	0
Kerala Blasters	2022–23	Indian Super League	0	0	0	0	–	–	–	–	0	0
Kerala Blasters	Kerala Blasters FC total		25	1	0	0	3	0	–	–	28	1
Hyderabad (loan)	2021–22	Indian Super League	3	0	0	0	0	0	–	–	3	0
Career total			90	11	6	0	3	0	0	0	99	11

=== International ===
National team	Year	Apps	Goals
India	2015	2	0
India	2016	1	0
India	2017	1	0
India	2018	1	0
Total		5	0
