= Karolis Skinkys =

Sporting director of Kerala Blasters

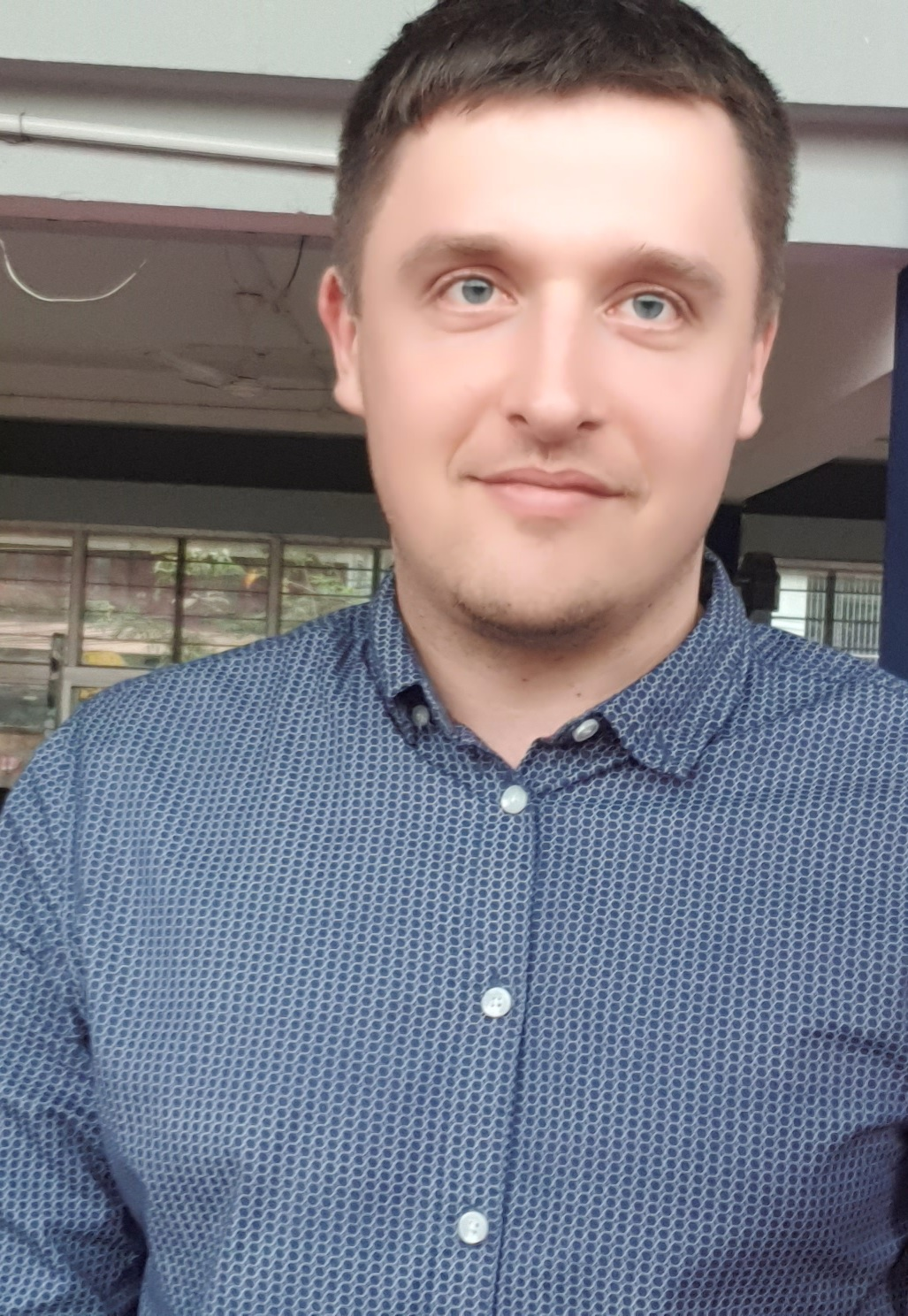
- Karolis in 2021
- Born: 16 November 1989 (age 36); Marijampolė, Lithuania
- Education: Vytautas Magnus University
- Employers: FK Sūduva (2014–2020); Kerala Blasters FC (2020–2026); FK Sūduva (2026–)
- Title: Sporting Director

Karolis Skinkys (born 16 November 1989) is a Lithuanian football executive, who works as the sporting director of TOPLYGA club FK Sūduva.

== Early life and education ==
Karolis was born on 16 November 1989 in the Lithuanian city Marijampolė. He completed his bachelor's as well as master's degree from the Vytautas Magnus University of Lithuania.

== Career ==
=== FK Suduva ===
In 2015, Karolis was appointed as the sporting director at FK Sūduva. He played an integral role in the process of team selection and internal leadership management, and during his tenure, the club rose to the top of the A Lyga in 2017, 2018 and 2019. In 2019, the club also qualified for the following year's UEFA Champions League, the first time it did so in its history. Karolis left the club in 2020.

=== Kerala Blasters ===
In March 2020, the Kerala Blasters announced that they have appointed Karolis as their sporting director. Having failed to make it to the playoffs for three successive seasons, the Kochi based club had been unable to replicate its initial success in the league. Karolis was appointed as their first ever sporting director in a bid to overhaul the club. Karolis appointed Kibu Vicuna as the new manager, while parting ways with Sandesh Jhingan, the player with the most appearances for the club. Karolis began implementing a new approach at the Blasters, with new supporting staff that included a tactical analyst and a fitness coach for the first time in the club's existence. He also opted to secure young Indian players in the transfer market. Nishu Kumar was signed on a four-year contract, along with other young players like Givson Singh, Rohit Kumar, Ritwik Das, Puitea and Prabhsukhan Gill. He also changed the foreign signing policy of the club, bringing in some players like Gary Hooper, Vicente Gómez, Costa Nhamoinesu and Bakary Kone despite a limited budget.

Despite these changes, the Blasters had a poor first season under Karolis' supervision. The club finished 10th in the league table and Kibu Vicuna left. "The performance of the team was affected by many details, some mistakes were there, some individual performances were not up to the mark, some mental issues. Kibu was a good professional and did his best, so if you ask me directly, is he the only reason, the answer is definitely no, there were many reasons" said Karolis when asked about the poor performance by the team.

Karolis appointed Ivan Vukomanović as the new head coach on 17 July 2021 ahead of the 2021–22 season. The Blasters qualified for the ISL finals for the first time since 2016. They faced Hyderabad in the final on 20 March 2022, eventually losing in a penalty shoot-out. The club achieved numerous milestones during the season, including a ten-match unbeaten run, topping the table for the first time in history, their highest goals scored, highest points obtained, highest number of wins and fewest losses.

In April 2022, Vukomanović's contract was extended for three more years until 2025. On 23 February 2023, Karolis signed a five-year contract with the Blasters till 2028, after the club qualified for consecutive playoffs for the first time in its history.

After spending six seasons with club, he left the Blasters in June 2026 amid organisational problems in the Indian Super league and uncertainty over the competition’s future.

=== Return to FK Suduva ===
After leaving Kerala Blasters, he returned to FK Suduva as their sporting director on 26 June 2026.
