= Bilal Khan (footballer) =

Indian footballer (born 1994)

Personal information
- Full name: Bilal Husain Khan
- Date of birth: 12 September 1994 (age 32)
- Place of birth: Khurja, Uttar Pradesh, India
- Height: 1.95 m (6 ft 5 in)
- Position: Goalkeeper

Team information
- Current team: Kannur Warriors
- Number: 1

Youth career
- Pune City B

Senior career*
Years	Team	Apps	(Gls)
2017–2019	Pune City	0	(0)
2017–2018	→ Gokulam Kerala (loan)	13	(0)
2018–2019	→ Real Kashmir (loan)	19	(0)
2019–2021	Kerala Blasters	5	(0)
2021–2022	Real Kashmir	11	(0)
2022–2023	Gokulam Kerala	2	(0)
2023–2024	Churchill Brothers	0	(0)
2024–	Kannur Warriors	0	(0)
- * Club domestic league appearances and goals as of 11:25, 27 August 2024 (UTC)

Bilal Husain Khan (born 12 September 1994) is an Indian professional footballer who plays as a goalkeeper for Super League Kerala club Kannur Warriors.

== Career ==
=== Churchill Brothers ===
He started his senior career with Churchill Brothers in 2013 and played 9 games there.

=== Hindustan FC ===
In 2014, he was signed by Hindustan FC. He made 12 appearances during the season.

=== Mohammedan SC ===
In 2016, he signed for Mohammedan. He was the second choice keeper there and made 5 appearances in total.

=== Pune City ===
Pune City signed him on 2017. But he was loaned to Gokulam Kerala.

=== Gokulam Kerala (loan) ===
He was there first keeper choice in Gokulam Kerala and played in 13 games and was a crucial member of the team.

=== Real Kashmir (loan) ===
Bilal Khan's best performance came during the 2018–19 I-League.He played in 20 games and got 9 clean-sheets during the season. He was selected as the goalkeeper of the tournament by winning the golden glove.

=== Kerala Blasters ===
On 10 July 2019, it was announced that Bilal was signed by the Indian Super League club Kerala Blasters FC. He made his ISL debut against ATK on 20 October 2019, where Blasters won the match by 2–1. He then made another 4 appearances during the season. After making no appearance in the 2020–21 Indian Super League, on 1 September 2021, the club announced the departure of Bilal from the club ahead of the 2021–22 Indian Super League.

== Honours ==
Individual

- I-League Best Goalkeeper: 2018–19

== Career statistics ==
=== Club ===
As of 18 April 2023

Club	Season	League			Cup		AFC		Total	
Club	Season	Division	Apps	Goals	Apps	Goals	Apps	Goals	Apps	Goals
Gokulam Kerala (loan)	2017–18	I-League	13	0	0	0	–		13	0
Real Kashmir (loan)	2018–19	I-League	19	0	1 (Note: Appearance(s) in Super Cup)	0	–		20	0
Kerala Blasters	2019–20	Indian Super League	5	0	0	0	–		5	0
Kerala Blasters	2020–21	Indian Super League	0	0	0	0	–		0	0
Kerala Blasters	Kerala Blasters total		5	0	0	0	0	0	5	0
Real Kashmir	2021–22	I-League	11	0	0	0	–		11	0
Gokulam Kerala	2022–23	I-League	2	0	1	0	–		3	0
Churchill Brothers	2023–24	I-League	0	0	0	0	–		0	0
Career total		I-League	50	0	2	0	0	0	52	0
