= Abdul Hakku Nediyodath =

Indian footballer (born 1994)

Abdul Hakku
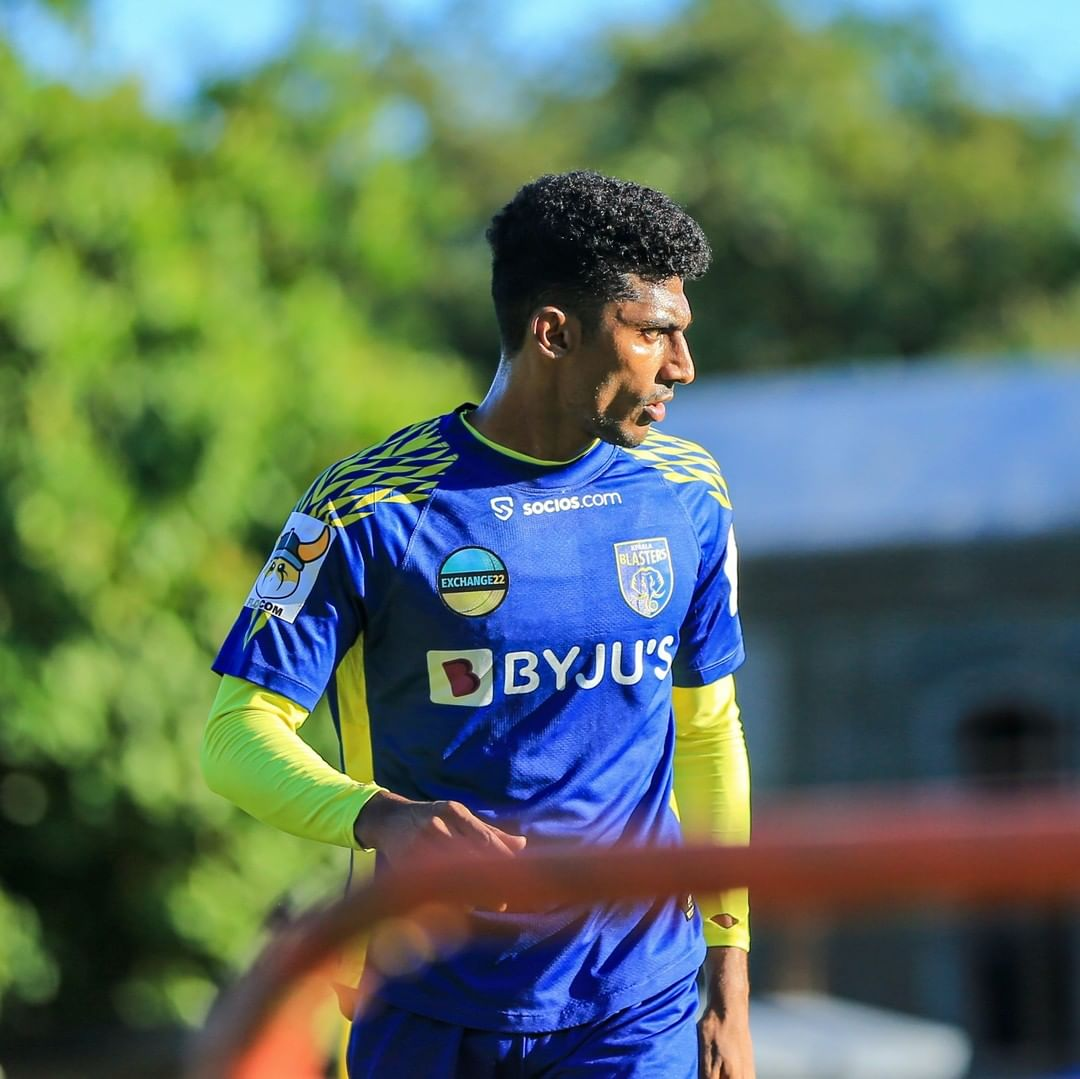
- Hakku with Kerala Blasters in 2021

Personal information
- Full name: Abdul Hakku Nediyodath
- Date of birth: 6 October 1994 (age 32)
- Place of birth: Malappuram, Kerala, India
- Height: 1.84 m (6 ft 1/2 in)
- Positions: Centre-back; right back

Team information
- Current team: Malappuram
- Number: 15

Youth career
- 2008–2013: SAT Tirur
- 2013–2015: DSK Shivajians

Senior career*
Years	Team	Apps	(Gls)
2015–2016	DSK Shivajians	13	(0)
2016–2017	Fateh Hyderabad	15	(1)
2017–2018	NorthEast United	4	(0)
2018–2022	Kerala Blasters	11	(1)
2022	→ Gokulam Kerala (loan)	5	(0)
2022–2023	Real Kashmir		
2023–2024	Gokulam Kerala	24	(1)
2024	Calicut	9	(0)
2025–	Malappuram		
- * Club domestic league appearances and goals

Abdul Hakku Nediyodath (born 6 October 1994), also known as Hakku, is an Indian professional footballer who plays as a defender for the Super League Kerala club Malappuram.

== Club career ==
=== Early career and DSK Shivajians ===
Born in Kerala, Hakku spent five youth years in the Sports Academy Tirur (SAT) before signing with DSK Shivajians, along with four other players. While with the youth team, Hakku played in various competitions with the club. On 26 January 2016, Hakku made his professional debut for DSK Shivajians in the I-League against East Bengal. He played the full-match and earned a yellow card as DSK Shivajians lost the match 1–0.

=== Fateh Hyderabad ===
In December 2016, Hakku signed for 2nd division club Fateh Hyderabad for 2nd division I- League season. He scored his first senior team goal with the club in the 2016–17 I-League 2nd Division season.

=== NorthEast United ===
In July 2017, Northeast United FC picked Abdul Hakku in 2017–18 ISL Players Draft as their 12th pick. He won the Emerging Player Award in his debut match against Jamshedpur FC on 18 November 2017.

=== Kerala Blasters FC ===
In 2018, it was announced that Hakku's Hometown club Kerala Blasters FC signed him. However he wasn't a first choice player and didn't get many games with the club. He played 2 games coming on as a substitute on both occasions in the 2018–19 Indian Super League.

During the 2019–20 season, Hakku became the first choice during some matches as the team were struggling due to injury problems. He made a total of 5 appearances for the club during the season.

On 29 July 2020, it was announced that Hakku has extended the contract with the Blasters till 2023. On 27 December, he scored his first ever goal for the Blasters against Hyderabad FC in the 29th minute, where the Blasters won the game 2–0.

Hakku was included in the Kerala Blasters squad for the 2021 Durand Cup, and played his first match against Indian Navy on 11 September, where he was injured within the first 15 minutes, but the Blasters won the match 1–0 at full-time. He played his first match in the 2021–22 Indian Super League against SC East Bengal on 12 December as a substitute for Enes Sipovic, which ended in a 1–1 draw.

==== Gokulam Kerala FC (loan) ====
On 23 December, it was announced Abdul Hakku, along with Sreekuttan V. S. has been loaned to Gokulam Kerala FC for the 2021–22 I-League season.

== Career statistics ==
=== Club ===
As of 03 March 2024

Club	Season	League			League Cup		Domestic Cup		AFC		Total	
Club	Season	Division	Apps	Goals	Apps	Goals	Apps	Goals	Apps	Goals	Apps	Goals
DSK Shivajians	2015–16	I-League	1	0	0	0	0	0	—		1	0
Fateh Hyderabad	2016–17	I-League 2nd Division	15	1	0	0	0	0	—		15	1
NorthEast United	2017–18	Indian Super League	4	0	0	0	0	0	—		4	0
Kerala Blasters	2018–19	Indian Super League	2	0	0	0	0	0	—		2	0
Kerala Blasters	2019–20	Indian Super League	5	0	0	0	0	0	—		5	0
Kerala Blasters	2020–21	Indian Super League	3	1	0	0	0	0	—		3	1
Kerala Blasters	2021–22	Indian Super League	1	0	0	0	1 (Note: Appearance(s) in Durand Cup)	0	—		2	0
Kerala Blasters	Kerala Blasters total		11	1	0	0	1	0	0	0	12	1
Gokulam Kerala (loan)	2021–22	I-League	5	0	0	0	0	0	2 (Note: Appearance(s) in AFC Cup)	0	7	0
Real Kashmir	2022–23	I-League	0	0	0	0	0	0	—		0	0
Gokulam Kerala	2022–23	I-League	11	1	4 (Note: Appearance(s) in Super Cup)	1	0	0	1 (Note: Appearance in playoff for AFC Cup)	0	16	2
Gokulam Kerala	2023–24	I-League	13	0	2	0	0	0	0	0	15	0
Gokulam Kerala	Gokulam Kerala total		29	1	6	1	0	0	3	0	38	2
Calicut	2024	Super League Kerala	0	0	0	0	0	0	0	0	0	0
Career total			59	3	6	1	1	0	3	0	71	4

== Honours ==
Kerala Blasters

- Indian Super League runner up: 2021–22.

Gokulam Kerala

- I-League: 2021–22

Calicut FC

- Super League Kerala: 2024
