= Shaiborlang Kharpan =

Indian footballer

Personal information
- Date of birth: 19 August 1995 (age 31)
- Place of birth: Meghalaya, India
- Height: 1.82 m (6 ft 0 in)
- Position: Striker

Team information
- Current team: Diamond Harbour
- Number: 13

Youth career
- Shillong Lajong

Senior career*
Years	Team	Apps	(Gls)
2012–2018	Shillong Lajong	10	(0)
2018	→ Kerala Blasters B (loan)	10	(7)
2018–2021	Kerala Blasters	0	(0)
2018–2020	Kerala Blasters B	5	(1)
2019	→ Ozone (loan)	7	(3)
2020–2021	→ Sudeva Delhi (loan)	11	(2)
2021–2022	Sudeva Delhi	6	(0)
2022–2023	Rajasthan United	18	(1)
2023–2024	SC Bengaluru	17	(5)
2024–	Diamond Harbour	17	(5)

International career
2013–2015	India U19	3	(0)
- * Club domestic league appearances and goals as of 21:40, 19 April 2025 (UTC)

Shaiborlang Kharpan (born 19 August 1995) is an Indian professional footballer who plays as a forward for I-League club Diamond Harbour.

== Career ==
=== Shillong Lajong ===
Kharpan is a youth product of Shillong Lajong. He was promoted to the senior team at the start of the 2013–14 season. He made his professional debut on 14 December 2013 against Sporting Goa at the Duler Stadium, Mapusa, Goa in which he came on as a substitute for Redeem Tlang in the 67th minute as Shillong Lajong lost the match 5–1.

=== Kerala Blasters ===
On 2017, he joined Kerala Blasters B scoring 7 goals in 10 matches. Having such an amazing season Ozone picked him up on loan the season after that scoring 3 in 6 matches. 2020 was good start for him as he was moved to the senior team.

=== Rajasthan United ===
In July 2022, I-League outfit Rajasthan United completed the permanent signing of Kharpan on a three-year deal.

== International ==
Kharpan was a part of the India U-19 team which participated in the 2014 AFC U-19 Championship qualification held at Qatar in 2013 October where he played 3 matches.

== Career statistics ==
=== Club ===
As of 19 April 2025

Club	Season	League			Cup		AFC		Total	
Club	Season	Division	Apps	Goals	Apps	Goals	Apps	Goals	Apps	Goals
Shillong Lajong	2013–14	I-League	3	0	0	0	—		3	0
Shillong Lajong	2014–15	I-League	3	0	0	0	—		3	0
Shillong Lajong	2017–18	I-League	4	0	0	0	—		4	0
Shillong Lajong	Total		10	0	0	0	0	0	10	0
Kerala Blasters B (loan)	2017–18	I-League 2nd Division	10	7	0	0	—		10	7
Kerala Blasters	2019–20	Indian Super League	0	0	0	0	—		0	0
Ozone (loan)	2018–19	I-League 2nd Division	7	3	0	0	—		7	3
Kerala Blasters B	2020	I-League 2nd Division	5	1	0	0	—		5	1
Sudeva Delhi (loan)	2020–21	I-League	11	2	0	0	—		11	2
Sudeva Delhi	2021–22	I-League	6	0	3 (Note: Appearance(s) in Durand Cup)	0	—		9	0
Rajasthan United	2022–23	I-League	18	1	1 (Note: Appearance(s) in Super Cup)	1	—		19	2
SC Bengaluru	2023–24	I-League 3	7	3	0	0	—		7	3
SC Bengaluru	2023–24	I-League 2	10	2	0	0	—		10	2
SC Bengaluru	Total		17	5	0	0	0	0	17	5
Diamond Habour	2024–25	I-League 3	5	2	0	0	—		5	2
Diamond Habour	2024–25	I-League 2	12	3	0	0	—		12	3
Diamond Habour	Total		17	5	0	0	0	0	17	5
Career total			101	23	4	1	0	0	105	24
