= Mouhamadou Gning =

Senegalese footballer (born 1989)

Moustapha Gning
Personal information
- Full name: Mouhamadou Moustapha Gning
- Date of birth: 23 January 1989 (age 37)
- Place of birth: Dakar, Senegal
- Height: 1.84 m (6 ft 0 in)
- Position: Defensive midfielder

Team information
- Current team: Numancia
- Number: 8

Senior career*
Years	Team	Apps	(Gls)
2007–2008	Monzalbarba		
2008–2010	Utebo	58	(3)
2010–2011	Andorra	29	(1)
2011–2013	Logroñés	46	(2)
2013–2014	Sariñena	33	(1)
2014–2015	Amorebieta	30	(4)
2015–2017	Ebro	67	(2)
2017–2018	Lleida Esportiu	28	(2)
2018–2019	Ejea	36	(1)
2019–2020	Kerala Blasters	13	(0)
2020–2022	Ejea	54	(0)
2022–2023	Tarazona	35	(2)
2023–	Numancia	96	(6)
- * Club domestic league appearances and goals as of 7 May 2026

Mouhamadou Moustapha Gning (born 23 January 1989), is a Senegalese footballer who plays as a defensive midfielder for CD Numancia in the Segunda Federación.

== Career statistics ==
=== Club ===
As of match played 13 March 2021

Appearances and goals by club, season and competition
Club	Season	League			National Cup		Other		Total	
Club	Season	Division	Apps	Goals	Apps	Goals	Apps	Goals	Apps	Goals
Logroñés	2011–12	Segunda División B	20	1	2	0	—		22	1
Logroñés	2012–13	Segunda División B	26	1	1	0	—		27	1
Logroñés	Total		46	2	3	0	0	0	49	2
Sariñena	2013–14	Segunda División B	33	1	2	0	—		35	1
Amorebieta	2014–15	Segunda División B	30	4	1	0	—		31	4
CD Ebro	2015–16	Segunda División B	32	0	3	0	—		35	0
CD Ebro	2016–17	Segunda División B	35	2	0	0	—		35	2
CD Ebro	Total		67	2	3	0	0	0	70	2
Lleida Esportiu	2017–18	Segunda División B	28	2	5	0	—		33	2
Ejea	2018–19	Segunda División B	36	1	0	0	—		36	1
Kerala Blasters	2019–20	Indian Super League	13	0	0	0	—		13	0
Ejea	2020–21	Segunda División B	15	0	0	0	—		15	0
Ejea	Total Ejea		51	1	0	0	0	0	51	1
Career total			268	12	14	0	0	0	282	12

== External sources ==
- Mouhamadou Gning at BDFutbol
