= Givson Singh =

Indian footballer (born 2002)

Personal information
- Full name: Givson Singh Moirangthem
- Date of birth: 5 June 2002 (age 24)
- Place of birth: Moirang, Manipur, India
- Height: 1.73 m (5 ft 8 in)
- Position: Midfielder

Team information
- Current team: Odisha

Youth career
- 2014–2016: Minerva Punjab
- 2016–2019: AIFF Elite Academy

Senior career*
Years	Team	Apps	(Gls)
2019–2020	Indian Arrows	16	(2)
2020–2024	Kerala Blasters	7	(0)
2023	→ Chennaiyin (loan)	0	(0)
2023–2024	→ Odisha (loan)	0	(0)
2024–	Odisha	0	(0)

International career
2017–2018	India U17	33	(7)
2019–2022	India U20	8	(5)
- * Club domestic league appearances and goals as of 30 March 2022

Givson Singh Moirangthem (born 5 June 2002) is an Indian professional footballer who plays as a midfielder for Indian Super League club Odisha FC.

== Club career ==
=== Youth and early career: 2014-2020 ===
Givson, who hails from Moirang started learning the tricks of the football under local coaches at an academy near his village before being scouted by I-League side Punjab F.C, then known as Minerva Punjab. He was brought into the India youth set-up after impressing then India U17 coach Nicolai Adam with his performances for Minerva. Though he did not make the cut for the 2017 India U17 side, he was brought into the All India Football Federation's Elite Academy in 2016. After spending three years at the academy, Givson was put onto the Indian Arrows, an AIFF owned team that consisted of India under-20 players to give them playing time. He made his first ever professional debut for a club in the 2019–20 I-League in a match against Gokulam Kerala F.C. He was brought in the 68th minute of the match as Indian Arrows lost 0–1.

He scored his first professional goal in a 2–1 win against Churchill Brothers FC in the 78th minute on 28 December 2019. He also stepped up to convert an injury-time penalty to hand Arrows a draw against Punjab FC. He made a total of 16 appearances during the season and also provided 2 assists along with 2 goals.

=== Kerala Blasters: 2020–present ===
On 19 August 2020, it was announced that Givson has signed for Kerala Blasters on a three-year deal. He made his debut for the Blasters on 2 January 2020 against Mumbai City FC, coming on as a substitute in the 86th minute. He totally made three appearances during his debut season with the club.

On 19 August 2021, Givson signed a three-year contract extension with Kerala Blasters, keeping him at the club until 2024. He was named in the Blasters squad for the 2021 Durand Cup, and made an appearance for the club in the tournament. He played his first match of the 2021–22 Indian Super League season against Odisha FC as a substitute for Chencho Gyeltshen on 12 January 2022, which they won 0–2 at full-time.

==== Loan to Chennaiyin ====
On 30 January 2023, the Blasters announced the transfer of Givson to Chennaiyin FC on a loan deal till the end of the season.

== International career ==
=== Youth career ===
Though he did not made it into for the final squad for the 2017 FIFA U-17 World Cup, Givson was part of the Indian U-16 team that reached the quarterfinals of the 2018 AFC U-16 Championship in Malaysia. Later he represented the U-17 side several times and made his U-19 debut against Russia U-19 in an international friendly on 4 June 2019.

== Career statistics ==
As of matches played till 30 March 2022

Club	Season	League			Cup		Continental		Durand Cup		Total	
Club	Season	Division	Apps	Goals	Apps	Goals	Apps	Goals	Apps	Goals	Apps	Goals
Indian Arrows	2019–20	I-League	16	2	0	0	—	—	—	—	16	2
Kerala Blasters	2020–21	Indian Super League	3	0	0	0	—	—	—	—	3	0
Kerala Blasters	2021–22	Indian Super League	4	0	0	0	—	—	1	0	5	0
Kerala Blasters	Kerala Blasters total		7	0	0	0	—	—	1	0	8	0
Career total			23	2	0	0	0	0	1	0	24	2

== Honours ==
Kerala Blasters

- Indian Super League runner up: 2021–22.
