= Juande =

Spanish footballer

Personal information
- Full name: Juan de Dios Prados López
- Date of birth: 12 August 1986 (age 40)
- Place of birth: Alicante, Spain
- Height: 1.83 m (6 ft 0 in)
- Position: Defensive midfielder

Youth career
- Costa Tropical
- Betis

Senior career*
Years	Team	Apps	(Gls)
2005–2007	Betis B	61	(5)
2005–2011	Betis	69	(3)
2011	→ Granada (loan)	17	(0)
2011–2012	Westerlo	14	(1)
2012–2014	Ponferradina	76	(0)
2014–2018	Spezia	62	(0)
2016–2017	→ UCAM Murcia (loan)	32	(0)
2018–2020	Perth Glory	39	(2)
2020–2021	Kerala Blasters	10	(0)
2021–2023	Adelaide United	45	(0)

International career
2007	Spain U21	1	(0)
- * Club domestic league appearances and goals as of 12:05, 24 July 2023 (UTC)

Juan de Dios Prados López (born 12 August 1986), known as Juande, is a Spanish professional footballer who plays as a defensive midfielder.

Brought up at Betis, he totalled 80 games and three goals for the club including three seasons in La Liga, and made 156 appearances in the Segunda División for them and three other teams. He also played in Belgium, Italy, Australia and India.

== Club career ==
=== Betis ===
Born in Alicante, Valencian Community, and brought up in Real Betis' youth system, Juande was raised in Motril, Province of Granada since he was a child, and he made his debut for the first team on 6 December 2005 in a UEFA Champions League game against R.S.C. Anderlecht, being replaced by Marcos Assunção in the 71st minute of a 0–1 home loss as the race for the UEFA Cup position was already decided in favour of the former.

Juande would only play in La Liga in the following season, his debut coming on 17 February 2007 as he started and was booked in a 0–0 draw at Real Madrid; at this time he was still registered for the reserves. He would appear in 22 matches in the 2007–08 campaign, scoring his first goal on 19 April 2008 in a 3–1 win over Atlético Madrid at the Vicente Calderón Stadium.

On 5 November 2007, it was speculated that English Premier League team Liverpool would make a €8 million purchase of Juande, replacing Mohamed Sissoko, but the deal never materialised. He played only nine games in 2008–09 as Betis were relegated to Segunda División after eight years, adding 19 (with two goals) the following season, with the Andalusians failing to regain their lost status.

In the last days of the 2011 January transfer window, Juande was loaned to Betis neighbours Granada CF, joining his local club until the end of the second division campaign. He totalled 29 appearances for the two teams, with both finally attaining promotion.

=== Later career ===
In August 2011, Juande released himself from his Betis contract and moved to K.V.C. Westerlo of the Belgian Pro League on a two-year deal. Twelve months later, he was back in his country's second tier at SD Ponferradina. After two seasons as an undisputed first choice for the team from El Bierzo, he joined Spezia Calcio in the Italian Serie B on 16 July 2014. Two years later he returned to his homeland, on loan to UCAM Murcia CF.

At the age of 32, Juande moved to the Australian A-League in July 2018, agreeing to a two-year contract at Perth Glory FC. He helped the club come first in his debut season, scoring a late penalty winner on 13 January in a 4–3 home victory over Western Sydney Wanderers FC. In September 2020, he left.

Juande joined Indian Super League side Kerala Blasters FC on 28 December 2020 for the remainder of the season, as a replacement for the seriously injured Sergio Cidoncha. He made his debut the following 15 January, coming on as a substitute for captain Jessel Carneiro in a 1–1 draw against SC East Bengal.

Juande returned to the Australian top division on 24 March 2021, signing a short-term deal with Adelaide United FC. His contract was renewed twice, both alongside compatriot Javi López.

On 29 January 2023, Juande was seriously injured during the match against Melbourne City FC when he and City's Florin Berenguer challenged for the ball in the 66th minute, breaking his right leg. Adelaide head coach Carl Veart commented: "It's something that you don't want to ever witness on a football field". "I was literally metres away from where it happened and I could hear the crack, it was an awful sound", sideline commentator Michael Zappone said; the match was paused for nearly half an hour as a consequence.

Juande left Adelaide United in June 2023, as his contract expired.

== International career ==
Juande won his only cap for the Spanish under-21s on 16 November 2007, coming in midway through the second half of the 3–0 home win against Poland for the 2009 UEFA European Championship qualifiers.

== Career statistics ==
As of match played 24 May 2023

Appearances and goals by club, season and competition
Club	Season	League			Cup		Continental		Total	
Club	Season	Division	Apps	Goals	Apps	Goals	Apps	Goals	Apps	Goals
Betis	2005–06	La Liga	0	0	0	0	1 (Note: Appearance in UEFA Champions League)	0	1	0
Betis	2006–07	La Liga	7	0	1	0	0	0	8	0
Betis	2007–08	La Liga	22	1	2	0	0	0	24	1
Betis	2008–09	La Liga	9	0	3	0	0	0	12	0
Betis	2009–10	Segunda División	19	2	0	0	0	0	19	2
Betis	2010–11	Segunda División	12	0	4	0	0	0	16	0
Betis	Total		69	3	10	0	1	0	80	3
Granada (loan)	2011–12	Segunda División	17	0	0	0	0	0	17	0
Westerlo	2011–12	Belgian Pro League	14	1	2	0	1 (Note: Appearance in Belgian Pro League play-offs)	0	17	1
Ponferradina	2012–13	Segunda División	35	0	2	0	0	0	37	0
Ponferradina	2013–14	Segunda División	41	0	1	0	0	0	42	0
Ponferradina	Total		76	0	3	0	0	0	79	0
Spezia	2014–15	Serie B	29	0	2	0	0	0	31	0
Spezia	2015–16	Serie B	21	0	3	0	0	0	24	0
Spezia	2017–18	Serie B	12	0	1	0	0	0	13	0
Spezia	Total		62	0	6	0	0	0	68	0
UCAM Murcia (loan)	2016–17	Segunda División	32	0	3	1	0	0	35	1
Perth Glory	2018–19	A-League	20	1	0	0	2 (Note: Appearances in A-League Finals Series play-offs)	0	22	1
Perth Glory	2019–20	A-League	19	1	0	0	2	0	21	1
Perth Glory	Total		39	2	0	0	4	0	43	2
Kerala Blasters	2020–21	Indian Super League	10	0	0	0	0	0	10	0
Adelaide United	2020–21	A-League	11	0	0	0	2	1	13	1
Adelaide United	2021–22	A-League Men	22	0	1	0	3	0	26	0
Adelaide United	2022–23	A-League Men	12	0	1	0	0	0	13	0
Total			45	0	2	0	5	1	52	1
Career total			364	6	26	1	11	1	401	8

== Honours ==
Betis

- Segunda División: 2010–11

Perth Glory

- A-League: Premiers 2018–19
