= Sergio Cidoncha =

Spanish footballer (born 1990)

Personal information
- Full name: Sergio Cidoncha Fernández
- Date of birth: 27 August 1990 (age 36)
- Place of birth: El Escorial, Spain
- Height: 1.82 m (6 ft 0 in)
- Position: Attacking midfielder

Team information
- Current team: México

Youth career
- Collado Villalba
- Atlético Madrid

Senior career*
Years	Team	Apps	(Gls)
2009–2011	Atlético Madrid C	58	(13)
2011–2014	Atlético Madrid B	57	(7)
2013–2014	→ Zaragoza (loan)	29	(2)
2014–2016	Albacete	33	(3)
2016–2018	Ponferradina	68	(8)
2018–2019	Jamshedpur	12	(3)
2019–2021	Kerala Blasters	16	(2)
2021–2022	Gimnástica Segoviana	30	(1)
2023–2025	Móstoles	45	(6)
2025–	México	17	(0)
- * Club domestic league appearances and goals as of 01:51, 3 February 2026 (UTC)

Sergio Cidoncha Fernández (born 27 August 1990) is a Spanish professional footballer who plays as an attacking midfielder for Tercera Federación club México FC.

== Club career ==
=== Spain ===
Born in El Escorial, Madrid, Cidoncha was a product of local Atlético Madrid's youth ranks. He made his senior debut in the 2009–10 season with the C team, in the Tercera División. Two years later, he was promoted to the reserves in the Segunda División B.

On 25 July 2013, Cidoncha was loaned to Real Zaragoza, recently relegated to Segunda División. He made his debut in the competition on 17 August, in a 1–1 away draw against Hércules CF.

On 4 August 2014, Cidoncha signed a two-year deal with Albacete Balompié, newly promoted to the second tier. He opened his scoring account in the league on 23 November, his brace helping the hosts to defeat CA Osasuna 2–0.

Cidoncha returned to division three in summer 2016, joining SD Ponferradina.

=== India ===
On 10 August 2018, 27-year-old Cidoncha moved abroad for the first time and signed with Indian Super League club Jamshedpur FC. He scored three goals in his only season, adding as many assists in a fifth-place finish.

Cidoncha moved to fellow top-tier side Kerala Blasters FC on 12 June 2019, on a two-year contract. He scored his first goal for them on 1 December, in the first minute of an eventual 2–2 home draw with FC Goa. At the end of the campaign, he agreed to a one-year extension.

On 18 November 2020, Cidoncha was named as one of the captains. Late in the same month, he was taken off the field in the last minutes of the fixture against Chennaiyin FC after a challenge from Enes Sipović; it was later confirmed that he had suffered a ligament injury to his right ankle, being expected to be on the sidelines for an extended period of time and eventually being replaced in the squad by his compatriot Juande.

=== Later career ===
Cidoncha returned to Spain on 27 August 2021, joining third-division Gimnástica Segoviana CF.

== Career statistics ==
As of match played on 1 December 2020

Club	Season	League			Cup		Other		Total	
Club	Season	Division	Apps	Goals	Apps	Goals	Apps	Goals	Apps	Goals
Atlético Madrid B	2011–12	Segunda División B	27	1	—		—		27	1
Atlético Madrid B	2012–13	Segunda División B	30	6	—		—		30	6
Atlético Madrid B	Total		57	7	—			—	57	7
Zaragoza (loan)	2013–14	Segunda División	29	2	1	0	—		30	2
Zaragoza (loan)	Total		29	2	1	0	—		30	2
Albacete	2014–15	Segunda División	27	3	3	1	—		30	4
Albacete	2015–16	Segunda División	6	0	1	0	—		7	0
Albacete	Total		33	3	4	1	—		37	4
Ponferradina	2016–17	Segunda División B	33	2	1	0	—		34	2
Ponferradina	2017–18	Segunda División B	35	6	5	2	—		40	8
Ponferradina	Total		68	8	6	2	—		74	10
Jamshedpur	2018–19	Indian Super League	12	3	0	0	—		12	3
Jamshedpur	Total		12	3	0	0	—		12	3
Kerala Blasters	2019–20	Indian Super League	13	1	0	0	—		13	1
Kerala Blasters	2020–21	Indian Super League	3	1	0	0	-		3	1
Career total			215	25	11	3	0	0	226	28
