= Lalruatthara =

Indian footballer

Personal information
- Date of birth: 17 January 1995 (age 31)
- Place of birth: Aizawl, Mizoram, India
- Height: 1.80 m (5 ft 11 in)
- Position: Left-back

Team information
- Current team: Aizawl FC
- Number: 39

Youth career
- 2010–2012: Chandigarh Football Academy
- 2012–2013: Luangmual

Senior career*
Years	Team	Apps	(Gls)
2013–2015	Chanmari		
2015–2017	Aizawl	34	(1)
2016	→ Odisha (loan)	0	(0)
2017–2021	Kerala Blasters	37	(0)
2021–2023	Odisha	16	(0)
2023–24	Inter Kashi	1	(0)
2024–	Aizawl	31	(1)

International career^{‡}
2017	India U23	2	(0)
2018	India	3	(0)
- * Club domestic league appearances and goals as of 29 November 2024 @ 16:06(AEST) ‡ National team caps and goals as of 28 May 2018

Lalruatthara (born 7 January 1995) is an Indian professional footballer who plays as a left-back for I-League club Aizawl FC.

== Club career ==
=== Early career ===
Born in Mizoram, Lalruatthara attended trials for the Chandigarh Football Academy in 2009 and managed to make it. He was soon though rejected from the academy for unknown reasons, with even Lalruatthara being confused over his exclusion. He soon joined the youth team of Luangmual before signing a senior contract with Chanmari of the Mizoram Premier League. He was part of the Chanmari side that won the 2013–14 edition of the Premier League and then the Mizoram team that won the 2014 Santosh Trophy.

=== Aizawl ===
Lalruatthara signed for newly promoted I-League side, Aizawl, from Chanmari before the 2015–16 season. He made his professional debut for the side on 9 January 2016 against Mohun Bagan. He played the full match and earned a yellow card as Aizawl lost 3–1.

He scored his first goal for the club on 17 January 2017 against Shillong Lajong. His 32nd-minute goal was the first in a 2–1 victory. He was soon part of the Aizawl side that won the 2016–17 I-League.

==== Odisha (loan) ====
On 18 September 2016 it was announced that Lalruatthara had signed with Indian Super League side Odisha on loan.

=== Kerala Blasters ===
On 23 July 2017, Lalruatthara was selected in the fourth round of the 2017–18 ISL Players Draft by the Kerala Blasters for the 2017–18 Indian Super League. He made his debut for the club on 17 November 2017 against ATK. He started the match and helped the Kerala Blasters to keep a 0–0 draw. Lalurathara won the Indian Super League Emerging Player of the League award in 2017–18 Indian Super League. After the season he extended the contract with the Blasters till 2021. During the 2018–19 Indian Super League season he made a total of 12 appearances for the Blasters. In the following season, he was suffered by an injury. He was only able to make 3 appearances for the Blasters in total during the season.

=== Odisha ===
On 8 June 2021, it was announced that Lalruatthara had signed with Indian Super League side Odisha on a two years deal.

== International ==
He made his debut for India on 27 March 2018 against Kyrgyzstan in 2019 AFC Asian Cup Qualifiers. In July 2017, he was selected in final India U23 squad which travelled to Qatar to play 2018 AFC U-23 Championship qualification.

== Career statistics ==
As of 2 September 2020

Club	Season	League			Cup		Continental		Total	
Club	Season	Division	Apps	Goals	Apps	Goals	Apps	Goals	Apps	Goals
Aizawl	2015–16	I-League	16	0	—	—	—	—	16	0
Aizawl	2016–17	I-League	11	1	—	—	—	—	11	1
Aizawl	Aizawl Total		27	1	0	0	0	0	27	1
Odisha (loan)	2016	ISL	0	0	—	—	—	—	0	0
Kerala Blasters	2017–18	ISL	17	0	1	0	—	—	17	0
Kerala Blasters	2018–19	ISL	12	0	0	0	—	—	12	0
Kerala Blasters	2019–20	ISL	3	0	0	0	—	—	3	0
Kerala Blasters	2020–21	ISL	1	0	0	0	—	—	1	0
Kerala Blasters Total			33	1	0	0	0	0	33	0
Career total			60	1	1	0	0	0	60	1

== Honours ==
India

- Intercontinental Cup: 2018

Aizawl

- I-League: 2016–17

Individual

- Indian Super League Emerging Player Of The Season: 2017–18:
