= Jairo Rodrigues =

Brazilian footballer

Personal information
- Full name: Jairo Rodrigues Peixoto Filho
- Date of birth: 31 December 1992 (age 33)
- Place of birth: Goiânia, Brazil
- Height: 1.90 m (6 ft 3 in)
- Position: Centre-back

Team information
- Current team: Song Lam Nghe An
- Number: 33

Youth career
- –2008: Goiás EC
- 2009–2010: Santos

Senior career*
Years	Team	Apps	(Gls)
2011–2012	América	0	(0)
2012–2014	Botev Vratsa	21	(0)
2014–2015	Trofense	26	(1)
2015–2017	Neftchi Baku	33	(2)
2017	Sepahan	7	(0)
2018	Montedio Yamagata	2	(0)
2019	Persela Lamongan	0	(0)
2019	Kerala Blasters	4	(0)
2020–2021	Fabril Barreiro	2	(0)
2021	União de Santarém	12	(1)
2021–2022	Hunedoara	4	(1)
2023	Khanh Hoa	14	(3)
2023–2026	Hoang Anh Gia Lai	73	(11)
2026–	Song Lam Nghe An	1	(0)
- * Club domestic league appearances and goals as of 6 September 2026

Jairo Rodrigues Peixoto Filho (born 31 December 1992) commonly known as Jairo, is a Brazilian professional footballer who plays as a centre-back for V.League 1 club Song Lam Nghe An.

== Career ==
Jairo was born in Goiânia. As a youth player he played for Goiás and Santos.

In July 2012, it was announced that Jairo had signed a contract with Botev Vratsa in Bulgaria. He made his league debut against Beroe Stara Zagora on 11 August, playing the full 90 minutes.

In August 2014, Jairo signed with Portuguese side Trofense.

On 22 September 2015, Jairo signed a contract with Neftchi Baku until May 2016.

On 20 August 2019, Jairo signed for Kerala Blasters.

In July 2026, after three seasons with Hoang Anh Gia Lai, Jairo left the club to join V.League 1 fellow Song Lam Nghe An.

== Career statistics ==
As of match played 20 October 2019

Appearances and goals by club, season and competition
Club	Season	League			National cup		League cup		Continental		Total	
Club	Season	Division	Apps	Goals	Apps	Goals	Apps	Goals	Apps	Goals	Apps	Goals
Botev Vratsa	2012–13	A Group	21	0	0	0	—		—		21	0
Trofense	2014–15	LigaPro	26	1	1	0	2	0	—		29	1
Neftchi Baku	2015–16	Azerbaijan Premier League	20	2	5	0	—		0	0	25	2
Neftchi Baku	2016–17	Azerbaijan Premier League	13	0	4	0	—		4	1	21	1
Neftchi Baku	Total		33	2	9	0	0	0	4	1	46	3
Sepahan	2017–18	Persian Gulf Pro League	7	0	0	0	—		—		7	0
Montedio Yamagata	2018	J2 League	2	0	1	0	—		—		3	0
Kerala Blasters	2019	Indian Super League	2	0	0	0	—		—		2	0
Khanh Hoa	2023	V.League 1	14	3	1	0	—		—		15	3
Career total			105	6	12	0	2	0	4	1	123	7

== Honours ==
CS Hunedoara

- Liga III: 2021–22
