= Costa Nhamoinesu =

Zimbabwean footballer (born 1986)

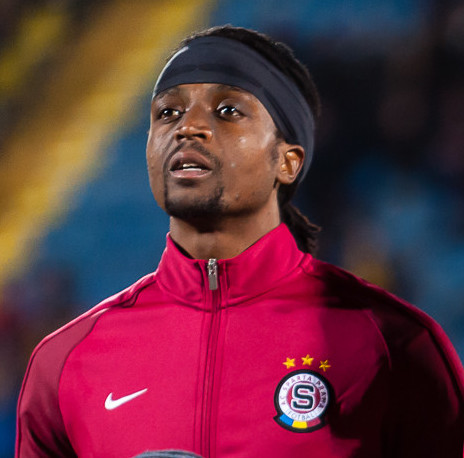
- Nhamoinesu with Sparta in 2017

Personal information
- Date of birth: 6 January 1986 (age 40)
- Place of birth: Harare, Zimbabwe
- Height: 1.87 m (6 ft 2 in)
- Positions: Centre-back; left-back

Senior career*
Years	Team	Apps	(Gls)
2005	AmaZulu		
2006–2010	Masvingo United		
2007–2008	→ KS Wisła Ustronianka (loan)		
2008–2010	→ Zagłębie Lubin (loan)	51	(1)
2010–2013	Zagłębie Lubin	61	(3)
2013–2020	Sparta Prague	146	(9)
2020–2021	Kerala Blasters	16	(2)
2021–2022	Podbeskidzie	1	(0)

International career
2015–2017	Zimbabwe	11	(1)
- * Club domestic league appearances and goals

Costa Nhamoinesu (born 6 January 1986) is a Zimbabwean former professional footballer who played as a centre-back. He works as a scout.

He started his senior career with Masvingo United. In 2008, he moved to Poland joining lower-league club KS Wisła Ustronianka on a half-year loan. He switched to Zagłębie Lubin on a two-year loan before signing permanently for Zagłębie Lubin in 2010. In 2013 he signed for Sparta Prague. After spending seven years there, he left the club in 2020 and joined Indian Super League club Kerala Blasters FC.

== Early life ==
Costa was born in Harare and was raised both in the city by his parents, and in the countryside with his grandparents. His parents' home did not have enough room for him to live there permanently, however, so he was forced to stay with friends and other relatives around the city. While at middle school he started playing football for a club which paid his education fees and accommodation.

== Club career ==
=== Early career ===
While playing in the Zimbabwean first league for Masvingo United, Nhamoinesu was spotted by an agent who sent him to Poland, where he began playing for 5th division amateur side KS Wisła Ustroniaka.

=== Zagłębie Lubin ===
In July 2008, he joined Zagłębie Lubin on loan, before signing permanently in 2010. While at Lubin, he became one of the most highly rated left-backs in the Polish league.

=== Sparta Prague ===
In 2013, seeking an exit from Poland, he signed a deal with Czech side AC Sparta Prague. He had also received offers from Russia, Germany and Turkey. He made his league debut for Sparta Prague on 21 July 2013 in a 4–1 away victory over Vysočina Jihlava. His first league goal for the club came on 31 August 2013 in a 4–1 home win over Baník Ostrava. The goal, scored in the 64th minute, made up for the own goal that he had scored in the 26th.

In July 2020, it was announced Nhamoinesu would leave the club after the club had decided not to renew the contract of the 34-year-old. He spent seven years with Sparta Prague. He was the first African player to captain the Czech side.

=== Kerala Blasters ===
On 10 October 2020, it was officially announced that Nhamoinesu joined the Indian Super League side Kerala Blasters FC on a one-year deal. By signing for the Blasters, he became the first Zimbabwe player to represent the club. On 18 November 2020, he was appointed as one of the captain ahead of the club's new season. He made his debut for the Blasters on 20 November 2020 in match against ATK Mohun Bagan where the Blasters suffered a 1–0 loss. On 10 January 2021, he scored his first goal for the club against Jamshedpur FC in which Blasters won 3–2. On 11 June, Nhamoinesu's exit from the club was announced.

=== TS Podbeskidzie ===
In July 2021, Nhamoinesu joined the Podbeskidzie Bielsko-Biała in the I liga. He left the club on 24 January 2022, citing personal reasons.

== International career ==
Nhamoinesu represented the Zimbabwe national team, for whom he made 11 appearances. On 20 October 2012, he was among those exonerated from a lifetime ban imposed on many Zimbabwean internationals for match fixing. Nhamoinesu scored his first goal for Zimbabwe on 28 March 2016 against Swaziland in a 2017 Africa Cup of Nations qualifier.

== After the active career ==
In 2022, Nhamoinesu ended his career and returned to Sparta Prague, where he was employed as a scout.

== Career statistics ==
=== Club ===
Appearances and goals by club, season and competition
Club	Season	League			National cup (Note: Includes Polish Cup, Czech Cup)		League cup		Continental		Other		Total	
Club	Season	Division	Apps	Goals	Apps	Goals	Apps	Goals	Apps	Goals	Apps	Goals	Apps	Goals
Zagłębie Lubin (loan)	2008–09	I liga	27	0	2	0	—		—		—		29	0
Zagłębie Lubin (loan)	2009–10	Ekstraklasa	24	1	1	0	—		—		—		25	1
Zagłębie Lubin (loan)	Total		51	1	3	0	0	0	0	0	0	0	54	1
Zagłębie Lubin	2010–11	Ekstraklasa	11	0	1	0	—		—		—		12	0
Zagłębie Lubin	2011–12	Ekstraklasa	27	2	0	0	—		—		—		27	2
Zagłębie Lubin	2012–13	Ekstraklasa	23	1	4	0	—		—		—		27	1
Zagłębie Lubin	Total		61	3	5	0	0	0	0	0	0	0	66	3
Sparta Prague	2013–14	Czech First League	24	3	4	0	—		2 (Note: Appearance(s) in UEFA Europa League)	0	0	0	30	3
Sparta Prague	2014–15	Czech First League	28	0	4	0	—		11 (Note: Three appearances in UEFA Champions League, eight appearances and one goal in UEFA Europa League)	1	1 (Note: Appearance in Czech Supercup)	0	44	1
Sparta Prague	2015–16	Czech First League	25	3	4	1	—		15 (Note: Two appearances in UEFA Champions League, thirteen appearances and two goals in UEFA Europa League)	2	0	0	44	7
Sparta Prague	2016–17	Czech First League	16	0	1	0	—		10 (Note: Two appearances in UEFA Champions League, eight appearances and one goal in UEFA Europa League)	1	0	0	27	0
Sparta Prague	2017–18	Czech First League	16	0	0	0	—		0	0	0	0	16	0
Sparta Prague	2018–19	Czech First League	28	2	3	0	—		1	0	0	0	32	2
Sparta Prague	2019–20	Czech First League	9	1	4	1	—		2	1	0	0	15	3
Sparta Prague	Total		146	9	20	2	0	0	41	5	1	0	208	16
Kerala Blasters	2020–21	Indian Super League	16	2	0	0	—		0	0	0	0	16	2
Podbeskidzie	2021–22	I liga	1	0	0	0	—		—		—		1	0
Career total			275	15	28	2	0	0	41	5	1	0	345	22

=== International ===
Scores and results list Zimbabwe's goal tally first, score column indicates score after each Nhamoinesu goal.

List of international goals scored by Costa Nhamoinesu
No.	Date	Venue	Opponent	Score	Result	Competition
1	28 March 2016	National Sports Stadium, Harare, Zimbabwe	Swaziland	2–0	4–0	2017 Africa Cup of Nations qualification

== Honours ==
Masvingo United

- Zimbabwean Independence Trophy: 2006, 2007

Sparta Prague

- Czech First League: 2013–14
- Czech Cup: 2013–14, 2019–20
- Czech Supercup: 2014

== Post-playing career, historical milestones, and philanthropy ==
=== Historical Records and Club Legend Status ===
During his foundational seven-year tenure with AC Sparta Prague (2013–2020), Nhamoinesu established several historic milestones in Central European football. He accumulated 203 official appearances for the club, making him the highest-capped foreign player in Sparta Prague's history at the time of his departure. He achieved further distinction by becoming the first Black African player to wear the captain's armband in the history of the club. He additionally holds the record as the Zimbabwean footballer with the highest number of appearances in UEFA club competitions, notably anchoring Sparta's run to the UEFA Europa League quarterfinals.

In recognition of his loyalty, exceptional character, and connection to the fanbase, he was officially inducted into the elite "Sparta Legends" registry. Featured heavily in club historical novels and books chronicling Sparta's modern era, local media, journalists, and former teammates (including Sporting Director Tomáš Rosický) have long cited Nhamoinesu as a premier example of elite integration, viewing him as an unofficial global ambassador for the club's core values. In 2022, Sparta executed a symbolic administrative transfer of his player rights back to Prague from Poland, ensuring he officially retired as a registered Sparta player.

=== Education and Technical Career ===
Nhamoinesu is a strong proponent of academic development and career foresight for athletes. In 2020, while still playing professionally for AC Sparta Prague, he obtained a Master's Diploma in Sports Management from the Netherlands-based Johan Cruyff Institute, using his final master's project to lay out the framework for his future academy. Following his retirement from active play, he furthered his postgraduate studies by earning a Master of Science (MSc) degree with distinction in Football Business from the University of East London.

Following his professional retirement in 2022, Nhamoinesu rejoined AC Sparta Prague in an official technical capacity as a talent scout. Working alongside Rosický, he served as a key technical staff member during the club's consecutive top-flight league title victories and their subsequent return to the UEFA Champions League. This marked a rare direct transition for a Zimbabwean footballer into an elite technical role at a major European side. He also works as an international television pundit and tactical analyst, notably appearing on Nova Sport for major tournament coverage.

=== Anti-Racism and Community Philanthropy ===
Nhamoinesu leverages his public platform and educational credentials to advocate for systemic diversity, integration, and player welfare. He is a regular guest lecturer for the Football Association of the Czech Republic (FAČR), delivering specialized modules to UEFA Pro License coaching candidates regarding the cultural and psychological adaptation of foreign players entering European leagues. During his time in the Czech Republic, he was highly vocal and heavily involved in launching extensive club-level anti-racism initiatives, with sports media attributing the progressive cultural evolution within Czech stadium stands partly to his long-standing activism.

In his native Zimbabwe, Nhamoinesu is the founder and primary financier of the Costa Sports Pro (CSPRO) Academy based in Chitungwiza. Distinct from a standard commercial or player-export business, the organization is structured as a non-profit, holistic youth empowerment and educational institution. Operating directly out of Nhamoinesu's family home with the support of local volunteer coaches, the academy provides over 80 youth players (ranging from under-11 to under-17 age groups) with free access to football training, educational scholarships, mental health support, and life skills literacy to combat local socio-economic obstacles such as substance abuse and crime. Nhamoinesu actively uses his personal story of overcoming a lack of early academic funds to inspire academy participants to pursue education. The academy also maintains a community exchange network, which has included sending youth players and coaches to train at Sparta Prague's facilities.
