= 2017–18 Kerala Blasters FC season =

4th season in existence of Kerala Blasters FC

Kerala Blasters
2017–18 season
- CEO: Varun Tripuraneni
- Head Coach: René Meulensteen (until 3 January 2018); David James (from 3 January 2018)
- Stadium: Jawaharlal Nehru Stadium, Kochi
- ISL: 6th
- Play-offs: DNQ
- Super Cup: Round of 16
- Top goalscorer: League: Iain Hume (5 goals); All: Iain Hume (5 goals)
- Highest home attendance: 37,986 vs. Bengaluru (31 December 2017)
- Lowest home attendance: 16,796 vs. Delhi Dynamos (27 January 2018)
- Average home league attendance: 31,763
Home colours	Away colours

The 2017–18 season was the fourth season in Kerala Blasters FC's existence, as well as their fourth season in Indian Super League. The club finished the Indian Super League points table in the 6th place, thus missing out the play-offs. The Blasters also made their debut in the inaugural edition of Super Cup during the season, being eliminated in the first round after losing against NEROCA.

Following the departure of Steve Coppell to the new side Jamshedpur, Kerala Blasters announced the signing of René Meulensteen as their new head coach on 14 July 2017. The club also participated in the 2017–18 ISL Players Draft, bringing in Rino Anto, Milan Singh, Arata Izumi, Subhasish Roy Chowdhury, and Jackichand Singh. Former Kerala Blasters forward Iain Hume rejoined the side in July while the club also signed former Manchester United players Wes Brown and Dimitar Berbatov in the lead up to the season.

After only winning one match in their first seven games, Meulensteen was relieved of his duties on 3 January 2018. David James, the Blasters head coach during the 2014 season, was brought in as the new head coach the same day.

== Background ==
Kerala Blasters began their preparations for the 2017–18 season by bringing in former Manchester United assistant coach René Meulensteen as the club's new head coach. The signing of Meulensteen came only two days after former head coach Steve Coppell announced that he would be leaving the club. A couple of weeks later, on 23 July 2017, the Kerala Blasters participated in the 2017–18 ISL Players Draft. Since the club had already retained the services of Sandesh Jhingan, C.K. Vineeth, and Prasanth Karuthadathkuni, the Blasters would enter the draft in round three. For their first draft pick, the Kerala Blasters selected defender Rino Anto. Anto was already part of the Kerala Blasters the previous season, on loan from Bengaluru. The club also selected India internationals, Milan Singh, Arata Izumi, Subhasish Roy Chowdhury, and Jackichand Singh. The club also selected defenders Lalruatthara and Lalthakima, both of whom won the I-League in 2016–17 with Aizawl.

The next day, on 24 July, the Kerala Blasters announced their first foreign signing of the season, Canadian international and former Kerala Blasters player, Iain Hume. Following the signing of Hume, the club made headlines when they signed former Manchester United defender Wes Brown on 15 August 2017, and another former Manchester United player, Dimitar Berbatov, on 24 August. "In terms of selection of players, we were looking at him for quite sometime," said Varun Tripuraneni, the Kerala Blasters CEO, "After Rene Meulensteen came on board, it became easier to get the deal done. Berbatov has been with Rene in Manchester United, so they share a comfort level and chemistry".

Just a few days prior to the start of the season, Meulensteen named Jhingan as his club captain for the season.

=== Signings ===
==== Indian draft ====
Round	Position	Player
1	No pick	
2	No pick	
3	DF	(India) Rino Anto
4	DF	(India) Lalruatthara
5	MF	(India) Milan Singh
6	MF	(India) Arata Izumi
7	GK	(India) Subhasish Roy Chowdhury
8	MF	(India) Jackichand Singh
9	MF	(India) Siam Hanghal
10	DF	(India) Lalthakima
11	DF	(India) Pritam Kumar Singh
12	DF	(India) Samuel Shadap
13	DF	(India) Loken Meitei
14	FW	(India) Karan Sawhney
15	MF	(India) Ajith Sivan

==== Other signings ====
Position	Player	Last club	Date	Ref
FW	(Canada) Iain Hume	(Spain) Extremadura	24 July 2017	
DF	(Ghana) Courage Pekuson	(Slovenia) FC Koper	10 August 2017	
DF	(Serbia) Nemanja Lakić-Pešić	(Austria) Kapfenberger SV	11 August 2017	
DF	(England) Wes Brown	(England) Blackburn Rovers	15 August 2017	
GK	(England) Paul Rachubka	(England) Bury	19 August 2017	
FW	(Netherlands) Mark Sifneos	(Netherlands) RKC Waalwijk	20 August 2017	
FW	(Bulgaria) Dimitar Berbatov	(Greece) PAOK	23 August 2017	
GK	(India) Sandip Nandy	(India) Southern Samity	31 August 2017	
DF	(India) Jishnu Balakrishnan	Free Agent	6 September 2017	
MF	(India) Sahal Abdul Samad	Free Agent	6 September 2017	
MF	(Uganda) Kizito Keziron	(Kenya) Leopards	3 January 2018	
FW	(Iceland) Guðjón Baldvinsson	(Iceland) Stjarnan (loan)	26 January 2018	
MF	(Spain) Pulga	(Bolivia) Nacional Potosí	1 February 2018	
Left Club Midseason
FW	(Netherlands) Mark Sifneos	Released	23 January 2018	
MF	(Uganda) Kizito Keziron	Injury Release	1 February 2018	

== Pre-season ==
11 October 2017 Friendly	Kerala Blasters	1–0	(Spain) Athletic de Coín	Marbella
	Pekuson 59'	Report

18 October 2017 Friendly	Kerala Blasters	1–1	(Spain) Juventud de Torremolinos	Marbella
	Sifneos 14'	Report

23 October 2017 Friendly	Kerala Blasters	2–0	(Spain) Real Balompédica Linense	Marbella
	Sifneos 20'Pekuson 79'	Report

26 October 2017 Friendly	Kerala Blasters	0–3	(Spain) Marbella	Marbella
		Report

11 November 2017 Friendly	Kerala Blasters	0–0	(India) Gokulam Kerala	Kerala
		Report

== Indian Super League ==
The 2017–18 season of the Indian Super League sees 10 teams play 18 matches during the regular season; two against each other team, with one match at each club's stadium. Three points are awarded for each win, one point per draw, and none for defeats. At the end of the regular season, the top four teams in the table qualify for the finals. The team in first will take on the team in fourth and the team in second will take on the team in third in two-legged ties. The winners of each tie will face off in the final at the Salt Lake Stadium in Kolkata on 17 March 2018.

The Kerala Blasters hosted ATK at the Jawaharlal Nehru Stadium, in a rematch of last season's final, on the opening day of the season. Despite the match being billed as a "high-voltage clash amid an electric atmosphere", the match ended in a 0–0 draw. The same result would occur a week later in the Blasters' second match against the new entrants Jamshedpur.

Following these two draws, René Meulensteen stressed how it important it was for the club to start scoring goals. "The most important goal to score in a season is the first one, because the moment you score the first one, it will bring confidence.” The first match of December was at home against Mumbai City on 3 December. The Blasters scored their first goal of the season in the 14th minute when Mark Sifneos scored from a cross from the wing. However, in the 77th minute, Mumbai City found an equalizer through Balwant Singh and the match ended 1–1 - a third draw in a row at home. After playing their first three matches of the season at home, the Kerala Blasters played their first away match of the season against Goa at the Fatorda Stadium on 9 December. A Mark Sifneos goal in the 7th minute saw the Blasters take an early lead before Manuel Lanzarote scored a brace for Goa to give the hosts a 2–1 lead. Jackichand Singh then scored an equalizer for Kerala to make it 2–2 before halftime. The second half would be different for the Kerala Blasters as they found themselves down 5–2 by the 54th minute. Coro, who had scored a hattrick the previous match for Goa against Bengaluru, grabbed another hattrick to succumb Kerala Blasters to their first defeat of the season.

The club responded very well from the defeat, earning their first victory of the season in the next match on 15 December against NorthEast United. C.K. Vineeth, who returned from suspension, scored the only goal of the match in the 24th minute from a header which came from a Rino Anto cross. Seven days later, the club returned to the road in the Southern derby against Chennaiyin. Despite Rene Mihelič scoring for the hosts in the 89th minute, C.K. Vineeth managed to equalize for the Kerala Blasters only five minutes later in stoppage time to give the Blasters a point.

The Kerala Blasters then ended the year with another 'Southern Derby" match against new expansion side Bengaluru at the Nehru Stadium. Meulensteen made several changes from the previous match against Chennaiyin, including dropping goalkeeper Paul Rachubka to the bench for Indian goalkeeper Subhasish Roy Chowdhury. Samuel Shadap also started at right back as replacement for the injured Rino Anto. C.K. Vineeth, who had been on form in the lead up to this match, was also dropped with no reason given and replaced with Iain Hume. During the match, the Blasters managed to hold Bengaluru at 0–0 going into halftime. However, in the 60th minute, Blasters captain Sandesh Jhingan handled the ball in the penalty box after a cross from Udanta Singh. Bengaluru's Sunil Chhetri converted the ensuing penalty to give the away side the lead. The Kerala Blasters proceeded to try to find the equalizer but three minutes into stoppage time Miku found the net for Bengaluru to increase their lead and then he did it again only a minute later to make it 3–0. Despite the two late goals, Courage Pekuson managed to find time to grab a consolation goal for the Blasters in the 96th minute as they fell to their second defeat of the season.

After the match, on 3 January 2018, it was announced that Meulensteen had been relieved of his duties as head coach of the club. That same day, the Kerala Blasters announced that David James, the club's head coach during the 2014 season, would return to the club. Also on that day, the club announced the signing of their eighth foreigner, midfielder Kizito Keziron from Leopards in Kenya.

James' first match in charge of the Kerala Blasters was against second place Pune City on 4 January 2018. His tenure in charge did not start well as the club found themselves 1–0 down at halftime through a Marcelinho goal. However, during the second half of the match, the Blasters came alive with James bringing on new signing Kizito Keziron after the halftime interval and the Ugandan contributed to what would be the equalizer for the Kerala Blasters. He sent a through-ball over to Courage Pekuson who then squared the ball into the middle for Mark Sifneos to slot it home in the 73rd minute. The match would go on to end 1–1.

After the match against Pune City, the Kerala Blasters started a three match run away from home. Their first match occurred on 10 January 2018 against last placed Delhi Dynamos. Iain Hume opened the scoring for the Blasters in the 12th minute when he put in a squared ball from Courage Pekuson. Then, right before halftime, Delhi found an equalizer through fullback Pritam Kotal. Hume then scored his second of the night in the 78th minute before completing his hat-trick in the 83rd minute when he outmuscled and outpaced Delhi defender Rowilson Rodrigues and chipped the ball over the onrushing goalkeeper. The match finished 3–1 to the Kerala Blasters. The team then extended their winning run to two, after securing a 1–0 victory in their match away to Mumbai City on 14 January 2018. Iain Hume was once again the lone scorer for the Blasters as the Canadian found the net in the 23rd minute.

Three days later, the Kerala Blasters played their final of three straight away matches against Jamshedpur. Paul Rachubka returned to the starting line-up while C.K. Vineeth also returned from injury. Despite the changes, the Kerala Blasters fell 2–1 to the new expansion side from Jharkhand. Jerry Mawihmingthanga opened the scoring for Jamshedpur in the very first minute when he converted what was a scuffed shot from teammate Ashim Biswas. Biswas then found the net himself 30 minutes later to extend Jamshedpur's lead. Mark Sifneos found a consolation goal for the Blasters three minutes into second half stoppage time but it was too late to save the match.

The Kerala Blasters returned home with a match against Goa on 21 January. David James decided to go with only four foreigners on the pitch for Kerala and it proved a bad choice only seven minutes into the match as Coro found the net. However, 22 minutes later, C.K. Vineeth managed to find Kerala's equalizer after he exploited the space left by the Goan defenders in the middle. Despite that though, Goa once again took the lead in the 77th minute when Edu Bedia won the game for Goa, 2–1.

On 27 January 2018, the Kerala Blasters took on bottom-placed Delhi Dynamos at the Nehru Stadium in Kochi. Coming into the match, the Blasters had released Dutch striker Mark Sifneos and signed former Iceland international Guðjón Baldvinsson as a replacement. David James once again sent out a side that played less than the 5 max foreigners allowed in the starting 11, with three taking the field. Kalu Uche gave the Delhi Dynamos the lead from the penalty spot in the 35th minute after Prasanth Karuthadathkuni brought Dynamos' Seityasen Singh down in the box. At halftime, James took off Karan Sawhney and brought on 19-year old Deependra Negi for his professional debut and three minutes into the second half the former India U17 captain scored the equalizer for the Kerala Blasters from a corner. Negi then contributed to the Blasters' second goal when he drew a penalty while running into the box. Iain Hume scored the ensuing spot kick as the Kerala Blasters went on to win 2–1.

On 2 February 2018, the Kerala Blasters played their first match of the last full month of the season against Pune City at the Balewadi Stadium. Despite having the most chances in the first half, it took until the 58th minute for the Blasters to take the lead through Jackichand Singh. Emiliano Alfaro then equalized for Pune City in the 78th minute before C.K. Vineeth found the winner for the Kerala Blasters three minutes into stoppage time for them to win 2–1. Six days later, the club traveled to Kolkata to take on ATK. Despite Guðjón Baldvinsson and Dimitar Berbatov scoring their first goals for the club, both times giving the team the lead, the Blasters conceded twice to draw the match 2–2.

The Kerala Blasters then ended their three-game away run with a victory against NorthEast United on 17 February 2018 at the Indira Gandhi Athletic Stadium. Wes Brown scored the winner for the club in the 28th minute to keep the Blasters hopes of qualification alive. On 23 February, the Blasters played their final home match of the season against Southern rivals Chennaiyin. Neither side could find the net in the 0–0 draw as the Blasters' chance of qualification for the finals suffered a massive blow.

The Blasters then ended their season on 1 March 2018 away from home against Bengaluru. Despite managing to hold on throughout the match, Bengaluru managed to come out as 2–0 winners with stoppage time goals coming from Miku and Udanta Singh. This meant that the Blasters had failed to qualify for the finals for the second time in their history.

17 November 2017 1	Kerala Blasters	0–0	ATK	Kochi
20:00 IST		Report		Stadium: Jawaharlal Nehru Stadium; Attendance: 37,462; Referee: Aurélien Juenkou

24 November 2017 2	Kerala Blasters	0–0	Jamshedpur	Kochi
20:00 IST		Report		Stadium: Jawaharlal Nehru Stadium; Attendance: 36,752; Referee: Ranjit Bakshi

3 December 2017 3	Kerala Blasters	1–1	Mumbai City	Kochi
20:00 IST	Sifneos 14'	Report	B. Singh 77'	Stadium: Jawaharlal Nehru Stadium; Attendance: 35,392; Referee: R Venkatesh

9 December 2017 4	Goa	5–2	Kerala Blasters	Margao
20:00 IST	Lanzarote 9', 18'; Coro 47', 51', 54'	Report	Sifneos 7'; J. Singh 30'	Stadium: Fatorda Stadium; Attendance: 18,482; Referee: C. R. Srikrishna

15 December 2017 5	Kerala Blasters	1–0	NorthEast United	Kochi
20:00 IST	Vineeth 24'	Report		Stadium: Jawaharlal Nehru Stadium; Attendance: 33,868; Referee: Rowan Arumughan

22 December 2017 6	Chennaiyin	1–1	Kerala Blasters	Chennai
20:00 IST	Vineeth 90+4'	Report	Rene Mihelič 89' (pen.)	Stadium: Jawaharlal Nehru Stadium; Attendance: 16,754; Referee: Pranjal Banerjee

31 December 2017 7	Kerala Blasters	1–3	Bengaluru	Kochi
17:30 IST	Pekuson 90+6'	Report	Chhetri 60' (pen.); Miku 90+3', 90+4'	Stadium: Jawaharlal Nehru Stadium; Attendance: 37,986; Referee: R Venkatesh

4 January 2018 8	Kerala Blasters	1–1	Pune City	Kochi
20:00 IST	Sifneos 73'	Report	Marcelinho 33'	Stadium: Jawaharlal Nehru Stadium; Attendance: 26,586; Referee: R. Venkatesh

10 January 2018 9	Delhi Dynamos	1–3	Kerala Blasters	Delhi
20:00 IST	Kotal 44'	Report	Hume 12', 78', 83'	Stadium: Jawaharlal Nehru Stadium; Attendance: 10,132; Referee: Tejas Nagvenkar

14 January 2018 10	Mumbai City	0–1	Kerala Blasters	Mumbai
17:30 IST		Report	Hume 23'	Stadium: Mumbai Football Arena; Attendance: 8,597; Referee: Pranjal Banerjee

17 January 2018 11	Jamshedpur	2–1	Kerala Blasters	Jamshedpur
20:00 IST	Mawihmingthanga 1'; Biswas 31'	Report	Sifneos 90+3'	Stadium: JRD Tata Sports Complex; Attendance: 21,240; Referee: Raul Gupta

21 January 2018 12	Kerala Blasters	1–2	Goa	Kochi
20:00 IST	Vineeth 29'	Report	Coro 7'; Bedia 77'	Stadium: Jawaharlal Nehru Stadium; Attendance: 29,769; Referee: Raul Gupta

27 January 2018 13	Kerala Blasters	2–1	Delhi Dynamos	Kochi
20:00 IST	Negi 48'; Hume 75' (pen.)	Report	Uche 35' (pen.)	Stadium: Jawaharlal Nehru Stadium; Attendance: 16,796; Referee: Ranjit Bakshi

2 February 2018 14	Pune City	1–2	Kerala Blasters	Pune
20:00 IST	Alfaro 78' (pen.)	Report	J. Singh 58'; Vineeth 90+3'	Stadium: Balewadi Stadium; Attendance: 9,463; Referee: Pranjal Banerjee

9 February 2018 15	ATK	2–2	Kerala Blasters	Kolkata
20:00 IST	Taylor 38'; Thorpe 75'	Report	Baldvinsson 33'; Berbatov 55'	Stadium: Salt Lake Stadium; Attendance: 4,292; Referee: R Venkatesh

17 February 2018 16	NorthEast United	0–1	Kerala Blasters	Guwahati
20:00 IST		Report	Brown 28'	Stadium: Indira Gandhi Athletic Stadium; Attendance: 1,212; Referee: Tejas Nagvenkar

23 February 2018 17	Kerala Blasters	0–0	Chennaiyin	Kochi
20:00 IST		Report		Stadium: Jawaharlal Nehru Stadium; Attendance: 31,259; Referee: Matthew Conger

1 March 2018 18	Bengaluru	2–0	Kerala Blasters	Bangalore
20:00 IST	Miku 90+1'; U. Singh 90+3'	Report		Stadium: Sree Kanteerava Stadium; Attendance: 25,373; Referee: Pranjal Banerjee

=== Table ===
Pos	Team	Pld	W	D	L	GF	GA	GD	Pts	Qualification or relegation
4	Pune City	18	9	3	6	30	21	+9	30	Qualification for ISL play-offs
5	Jamshedpur	18	7	5	6	16	18	−2	26	
6	Kerala Blasters	18	6	7	5	20	22	−2	25	
7	Mumbai City	18	7	2	9	25	29	−4	23	
8	Delhi Dynamos	18	5	4	9	27	37	−10	19	

Source: Indian Super League
Rules for classification: 1) points; 2) head-to-head points; 3) head-to-head goal difference; 4) head-to-head goals scored; 5) goal difference; 5) number of goals scored; 6) fair play ranking; 6) drawing of lots

=== Results summary ===
Overall								Home						Away					
Pld	W	D	L	GF	GA	GD	Pts	W	D	L	GF	GA	GD	W	D	L	GF	GA	GD
18	6	7	5	20	22	−2	25	2	6	2	7	8	−1	4	1	3	13	14	−1

Last updated: 1 March 2018.
Source: http://www.indiansuperleague.com/isl-2017/schedule-fixtures

== Super Cup ==
The Super Cup is a knockout football competition in India. The 2018 edition was the first ever tournament. The competition only featured teams from both the Indian Super League and the I-League, India's two top-tier football leagues. As the Kerala Blasters finished in sixth place during the 2017–18 ISL season, they entered the main competition directly which was hosted at the Kalinga Stadium in Bhubaneswar.

The Kerala Blasters were drawn to face NEROCA on 6 April 2018. NEROCA had finished 2nd in the 2017–18 I-League.

After the match, the Blasters were eliminated by

losi for ng 3–2. Goals for NEROCA were scored by Jean-Michel Joachim, Aryn Williams, and Felix Chidi Odili while Kerala Blasters found the net through Pulga and Prasanth Karuthadathkuni.

6 April 2018 First round	NEROCA	3–2	Kerala Blasters	Bhubaneswar
	Joachim 68'; Williams 79'; Odili 81' (pen.)	Report	Pulga 11'; Karuthadathkuni 49'	Stadium: Kalinga Stadium; Attendance: 1,865; Referee: Pranjal Banerjee

== Player statistics ==
Season stats
#	Position	Player	League				Cup				Total			
#	Position	Player	GP	G	A yellow rectangular card	A red rectangular card	GP	G	A yellow rectangular card	A red rectangular card	GP	G	A yellow rectangular card	A red rectangular card
1	GK	(England) Paul Rachubka	11(1)	0	0	0	1	0	0	0	12(1)	0	0	0
4	DF	(Serbia) Nemanja Lakić-Pešić	9(3)	0	7	0	1	0	0	0	10(3)	0	7	0
6	DF	(England) Wes Brown	14	1	3	0	1	0	0	0	15	1	3	0
7	FW	(India) Karan Sawhney	2(2)	0	0	0	0	0	0	0	2(2)	0	0	0
8	MF	(India) Arata Izumi	4(2)	0	0	0	1	0	0	0	5(2)	0	0	0
9	FW	(Bulgaria) Dimitar Berbatov	8(1)	1	1	0	0	0	0	0	8(1)	1	1	0
10	FW	(Canada) Iain Hume	10(3)	5	1	0	0	0	0	0	10(3)	5	1	0
11	FW	(India) Prasanth Karuthadathkuni	4(6)	0	1	0	1	1	0	0	5(6)	1	1	0
12	MF	(India) Milan Singh	9(6)	0	1	0	1	0	0	0	10(6)	0	1	0
13	MF	(India) C.K. Vineeth	13 (1)	4	2	1	1	0	0	0	14(1)	4	0	0
14	MF	(India) Loken Meitei	1(5)	0	0	0	0(1)	0	0	0	1(6)	0	0	0
15	MF	(India) Deependra Negi	1(2)	1	0	0	0(1)	0	0	0	1(3)	1	0	0
16	FW	(Iceland) Guðjón Baldvinsson	4(2)	1	0	0	0	0	0	0	4(2)	1	0	0
18	MF	(India) Sahal Abdul Samad	0(2)	0	0	0	0	0	0	0	0(2)	0	0	0
19	MF	(India) Siam Hanghal	6(2)	0	1	0	0	0	0	0	6(2)	0	1	0
20	MF	(India) Jackichand Singh	16(1)	2	0	0	0	0	0	0	16(1)	2	0	0
21	DF	(India) Sandesh Jhingan	17	0	4	0	1	0	0	0	18	0	4	0
22	DF	(India) Jishnu Balakrishnan	0	0	0	0	0	0	0	0	0	0	0	0
23	DF	(India) Pritam Kumar Singh	0 (1)	0	1	0	0	0	0	0	0(1)	0	1	0
24	GK	(India) Sandip Nandy	0	0	0	0	0	0	0	0	0	0	0	0
25	GK	(India) Sujith Sasikumar	0	0	0	0	0	0	0	0	0	0	0	0
27	GK	(India) Subhasish Roy Chowdhury	7	0	1	0	0	0	0	0	7	0	1	0
28	DF	(India) Samuel Shadap	2(2)	0	1	0	0	0	0	0	2(2)	0	1	0
31	DF	(India) Rino Anto	13	0	0	0	0(1)	0	0	0	13(1)	0	0	0
32	DF	(India) Lalthakima	0	0	0	0	0	0	0	0	0	0	0	0
36	MF	(India) Ajith Sivan	0	0	0	0	0	0	0	0	0	0	0	0
39	DF	(India) Lalruatthara	17	0	4	0	1	0	0	0	18	0	4	0
85	MF	(Spain) Pulga	1	0	0	0	1	1	0	0	2	1	0	0
99	MF	(Ghana) Courage Pekuson	17	1	1	0	1	0	0	0	18	1	1	0
Left Club Midseason
29	FW	(Netherlands) Mark Sifneos	7 (5)	4	1	0								
17	MF	(Uganda) Kizito Keziron	3 (1)	0	0	0								

=== Goalscorers ===
As of 6 April 2018

Rank	Position	Name	Indian Super League	Indian Super Cup	Total
1	FW	(Canada) Iain Hume	5	0	5
2	FW	(Netherlands) Mark Sifneos	4	0	4
2	MF	(India) C.K. Vineeth	4	0	4
4	MF	(India) Jackichand Singh	2	0	2
5	MF	(Ghana) Courage Pekuson	1	0	1
5	MF	(India) Deependra Negi	1	0	1
5	FW	(Iceland) Guðjón Baldvinsson	1	0	1
5	FW	(Bulgaria) Dimitar Berbatov	1	0	1
5	DF	(England) Wes Brown	1	0	1
5	MF	(Spain) Pulga	0	1	1
5	FW	(India) Prasanth Karuthadathkuni	0	1	1

=== Clean sheets ===
As of 6 April 2018

Rank	Name	Indian Super League	Total
1	(England) Paul Rachubka	5	5
2	(India) Subhasish Roy Chowdhury	1	1

== See also ==
- 2017–18 in Indian football
