= 2018–19 Kerala Blasters FC season =

5th season in existence of Kerala Blasters FC

Kerala Blasters
2018–19 season
- CEO: Varun Tripuneni(till 6 March 2019), Viren D'Silva(from 7 March 2019)
- Head Coach: David James(till 22 Dec 2018), Nelo Vingada(from 18 Jan 2019)
- Stadium: Jawaharlal Nehru Stadium, Kochi, Kerala
- Indian Super League: 9th
- Top goalscorer: League: Slaviša Stojanović; Matej Poplatnik (4 goals each); All: Slaviša Stojanović; Matej Poplatnik (4 goals each)
- Highest home attendance: 34,539
- Lowest home attendance: 1,564
- Average home league attendance: 16,432
Home colours	Away colours

The 2018–19 season was the fifth season in Kerala Blasters FC's existence, as well as their fifth season in Indian Super League.

== Review and events ==
=== Indian Super League ===
Kerala Blasters started their 2018–19 Hero Indian Super League campaign with a 0–2 victory over ATK. But the Hero ISL 2018–19 was a disastrous campaign for Kerala Blasters as they finished the season in 9th place in the table.

=== Super Cup ===
The team's performance in the Super Cup was also well below as that of expected. They were eliminated in the qualification round by Indian Arrows.

== Players ==
=== First-team squad ===
Note: Flags indicate national team as defined under FIFA eligibility rules; some limited exceptions apply. Players may hold more than one non-FIFA nationality.

No.	Pos.	Nation	Player
1	GK	IND	Dheeraj Singh
4	DF	SRB	Nemanja Lakić-Pešić
5	DF	IND	Abdul Hakku
6	MF	SRB	Nikola Krčmarević
7	DF	FRA	Cyril Kali
8	FW	SRB	Slaviša Stojanović
9	MF	IND	Seiminlen Doungel
10	FW	SLO	Matej Poplatnik
11	MF	IND	Prasanth K
12	DF	IND	Mohammad Rakip
15	DF	IND	Anas Edathodika
17	MF	UGA	Kizito Keziron

No.	Pos.	Nation	Player
18	MF	IND	Sahal Abdul Samad
20	MF	IND	Deependra Negi
21	DF	IND	Sandesh Jhingan
22	MF	IND	Zakeer Mundampara
23	DF	IND	Pritam Singh
25	GK	IND	Sujith Sasikumar
30	FW	IND	Baoringdao Bodo
33	FW	IND	Jithin MS
34	MF	IND	Suraj Rawat
35	MF	IND	Hrishi Dhath
39	DF	IND	Lalruatthara
99	MF	GHA	Courage Pekuson

=== Players In ===
No.	Position	Player	Last club	Date	Ref
1	GK	(India) Dheeraj Singh Moirangthem	(India) Indian Arrows	2 June 2018	
15	DF	(India) Anas Edathodika	(India) Jamshedpur	8 June 2018	
19	MF	(India) Halicharan Narzary	(India) NorthEast United	12 June 2018	
_	DF	(India) Abdul Nediyodath	(India) NorthEast United	19 June 2018	
32	GK	(India) Naveen Kumar	(India) Goa	25 June 2018	
33	FW	Jithin MS	(India) F.C. Kerala	27 June 2018	
9	FW	(India) Seiminlen Doungel	(India) NorthEast United	29 June 2018	
7	DF	(France) Cyril Kali	(Greece) Apollon Pontus	3 July 2018	
8	FW	(Serbia) Slaviša Stojanović	(Serbia) Radnički Niš	6 July 2018	
10	FW	(Slovenia) Matej Poplatnik	(Slovenia) Triglav Kranj	8 July 2018	
22	MF	(India) Zakeer Mundampara	(India) Mumbai City	9 July 2018	
26	MF	(Serbia) Nikola Krcmarevic	(Faroe Islands) 07 Vestur	24 August 2018	
–	MF	(India) Jeakson Singh	(India) Minerva Punjab	22 September 2018	
30	FW	(India) Baoringdao Bodo	(India) Chennaiyin FC	24 January 2019	

=== Players Out ===
No.	Position	Player	Outgoing club	Date	Fee	Ref
10	FW	(Canada) Iain Hume	(India) FC Pune City	6 June 2018	Deal	
15	FW	(Iceland) Guðjón Baldvinsson	(Iceland) Stjarnan	16 March 2018	End of Loan	
27	GK	(India) Subhasish Roy Chowdhury	(India) Jamshedpur	26 April 2018	Free	
31	DF	(India) Rino Anto	(India) Bengaluru	6 June 2018	Free	
19	MF	(India) Siam Hanghal	(India) Delhi Dynamos	11 June 2018	Free	
20	MF	(India) Jackichand Singh	(India) Goa	29 June 2018	Free	
–	MF	(India) Jeakson Singh	(India) Indian Arrows	23 September 2018	Loan Out	
13	FW	(India) C. K. Vineeth	(India) Chennaiyin FC	24 January 2019	Loan Out	
19	MF	(India) Halicharan Narzary	(India) Chennaiyin FC	24 January 2019	Loan Out	
32	GK	(India) Naveen Kumar	(India) FC Goa	24 January 2019	Loan Out	

== Statistics ==
=== Squad appearances and goals ===
No.	Pos	Nat	Player	Total		ISL		Super Cup	
No.	Pos	Nat	Player	Apps	Goals	Apps	Goals	Apps	Goals
Goalkeepers
1	GK	(India) IND	Dheeraj Singh	14	0	13	0	1	0
25	GK	(India) IND	Sujith Sasikumar	0	0	0	0	0	0
32	GK	(India) IND	Naveen Kumar	5	0	5	0	0	0
Defenders
4	DF	(Serbia) SRB	Nemanja Lakić-Pešić	15	0	14	0	1	0
5	DF	(India) IND	Abdul Hakku	2	0	2	0	0	0
7	DF	(France) FRA	Cyril Kali	14	0	14	0	0	0
12	DF	(India) IND	Mohammad Rakip	12	0	11	0	1	0
15	DF	(India) IND	Anas Edathodika	9	0	8	0	1	0
21	DF	(India) IND	Sandesh Jhingan	19	0	18	0	1	0
23	DF	(India) IND	Pritam Singh	6	0	5	0	1	0
39	DF	(India) IND	Lalruatthara	12	0	12	0	0	0
Midfielders
6	MF	(Serbia) SRB	Nikola Krčmarević	13	2	12	2	1	0
9	MF	(India) IND	Seiminlen Doungel	19	2	18	2	1	0
11	MF	(India) IND	Prasanth K	12	0	11	0	1	0
17	MF	(Uganda) UGA	Kizito Keziron	14	0	13	0	1	0
18	MF	(India) IND	Sahal Abdul Samad	18	1	17	1	1	0
19	MF	(India) IND	Halicharan Narzary	12	1	12	1	0	0
20	MF	(India) IND	Deependra Negi	0	0	0	0	0	0
22	MF	(India) IND	Zakeer Mundampara	6	0	5	0	1	0
33	MF	(India) IND	Jithin MS	0	0	0	0	0	0
34	MF	(India) IND	Suraj Rawat	2	0	2	0	0	0
35	MF	(India) IND	Hrishi Dhath	0	0	0	0	0	0
99	MF	(Ghana) GHA	Courage Pekuson	13	1	13	1	0	0
Forwards
10	FW	(Serbia) SRB	Slaviša Stojanović	17	4	16	4	1	0
10	FW	(Slovenia) SLO	Matej Poplatnik	17	4	16	4	1	0
13	FW	(India) IND	C.K. Vineeth	10	2	10	2	0	0
30	FW	(India) IND	Baoringdao Bodo	2	0	2	0	0	0

=== Squad statistics ===
	ISL	Super Cup	Total
Games played	18	1	19
Games won	2	0	2
Games drawn	9	0	9
Games lost	7	1	8
Goals scored	18	0	18
Goals conceded	28	2	30
Goal difference	−10	−2	−12
Clean sheets	4	0	4
Yellow cards	37	1	38
Red cards	2	1	3

Players Used: Kerala Blasters has used a total of 23 different players in all competitions.

=== Goalscorers ===
No.	Pos.	Nation	Name	ISL	Super Cup	Total
8	MF	(Serbia)	Slaviša Stojanović	4	0	4
10	MF	(Slovenia)	Matej Poplatnik	4	0	4
6	FW	(Serbia)	Nikola Krčmarević	2	0	2
13	MF	(India)	C.K. Vineeth	2	0	2
9	MF	(India)	Seiminlen Doungel	2	0	2
19	MF	(India)	Halicharan Narzary	1	0	1
18	MF	(India)	Sahal Abdul Samad	1	0	1
99	MF	(Ghana)	Courage Pekuson	1	0	1
Own Goal				1	0	1
TOTAL				18	0	18

=== Clean sheets ===
No.	Nation	Name	ISL	Super Cup	Total	Games played
2	(India)	Dheeraj Singh	4	0	4	14
TOTAL			4	0	4	19

=== Disciplinary record ===
No.	Pos.	Nation	Name	ISL			Super Cup			Total		
No.	Pos.	Nation	Name	Yellow card	Second yellow card	Red card	Yellow card	Second yellow card	Red card	Yellow card	Second yellow card	Red card
39	DF	(India)	Lalruatthara	5	0	1	0	0	0	5	0	1
15	DF	(India)	Anas Edathodika	0	0	0	0	0	1	0	0	1
22	MF	(India)	Zakeer Mundampara	1	1	0	0	0	0	1	1	0
21	DF	(India)	Sandesh Jhingan	4	0	0	0	0	0	4	0	0
1	GK	(India)	Dheeraj Singh	3	0	0	0	0	0	3	0	0
18	MF	(India)	Sahal Abdul Samad	3	0	0	1	0	0	4	0	0
13	MF	(India)	C.K. Vineeth	2	0	0	0	0	0	2	0	0
10	FW	(Slovenia)	Matej Poplatnik	2	0	0	0	0	0	2	0	0
7	DF	(India)	Cyril Kali	2	0	0	0	0	0	2	0	0
8	MF	(Serbia)	Slaviša Stojanović	2	0	0	0	0	0	2	0	0
4	DF	(Serbia)	Nemanja Lakić-Pešić	2	0	0	0	0	0	2	0	0
6	MF	(Serbia)	Nikola Krčmarević	2	0	0	0	0	0	2	0	0
9	MF	(India)	Seiminlen Doungel	2	0	0	0	0	0	2	0	0
19	MF	(India)	Halicharan Narzary	1	0	0	0	0	0	1	0	0
23	DF	(India)	Pritam Singh	1	0	0	0	0	0	1	0	0
11	MF	(India)	Prasanth K	1	0	0	0	0	0	1	0	0
17	MF	(Uganda)	Kizito Keziron	1	0	0	0	0	0	1	0	0
5	DF	(India)	Abdul Hakku	1	0	0	0	0	0	1	0	0
TOTAL				35	1	1	1	0	1	36	1	2

== Pre-season and friendlies ==
Win Draw Loss

Kerala Blasters started their pre season in July in Ahmedabad to prepare for a competition called Toyota Yaris La Liga World. They faced Melbourne City FC from Australia and Spanish club Girona FC in the competition. They suffered heavy losses by Australian club 0–6 and Spanish club 0–5.

In September 2018, Kerala started their second phase of pre season before Indian Super League in Thailand. Where they played some friendly matches with local clubs.

24 July 2018 Toyota Yaris LaLiga World	Kerala Blasters (India)	0–6	(Australia) Melbourne City	Kochi, India
19:00 IST		Source	Dario Vidosic 30'; Riley McGree 33', 56'; Lachlan Wales 50'; Ramy Najjarine 75'; Bruno Fornaroli 79'	Stadium: Jawaharlal Nehru International Stadium

28 July 2018 Toyota Yaris LaLiga World	Kerala Blasters (India)	0–5	(Spain) Girona FC	Kochi, India
19:00 IST		Source	Eric Monteś 43'; Pedro Porro 54'; Alex Granell 57'; Aday Benitez 75'; Aleix Garcia Serrano 90+2'	Stadium: Jawaharlal Nehru International Stadium

7 September 2018 Friendly	Thonburi University (Thailand)	1–4	(India) Kerala Blasters	Bangkok, Thailand
15:00 IST	T. Punboonchu 85'		Doungel 17'; Sahal 70'; Stojanović 73'; Kharpan 80'	Stadium: Thonburi University Stadium, Thailand

12 September 2018 Friendly	Port FC B (Thailand)	1–3	(India) Kerala Blasters	Bangkok, Thailand
15:00 IST	Ariya Pon 74'	Source	Sahal 47'; C.K. Vineeth 54'; Stojanović 86'	Stadium: PAT Stadium, Thailand

19 September 2018 Friendly	Bangkok United FC B (Thailand)	0–2	(India) Kerala Blasters	Pathum Thani, Thailand
15:00 IST		Source	Nikola 50'; Matej 67'	Stadium: Thammasat Stadium, Thailand

21 September 2018 Friendly	Buriram United FC B (Thailand)	0–6	(India) Kerala Blasters	Buriram, Thailand
15:00 IST		Source	Doungel 27', 45'; Slavisa 32'; Hrishi 38'; Zakeer 50'; Matej 58'	Stadium: Chang Arena, Thailand

== Competitions ==
Win Draw Loss

=== Overview ===
Competition	First match	Last match	Starting round	Record							
Competition	First match	Last match	Starting round	Pld	W	D	L	GF	GA	GD	Win %
ISL	29 September 2018	1 March 2019	Matchday 1	18	2	9	7	18	28	−10	11.11
Super Cup				1	0	0	1	0	2	−2	0.00
Total				19	2	9	8	18	30	−12	10.53

Last updated: 6 March 2019.
Source: Competitions

=== Indian Super League ===
==== Standings ====
Pos	Team	Pld	W	D	L	GF	GA	GD	Pts
6	ATK	18	6	6	6	18	22	−4	24
7	Pune City	18	6	4	8	24	30	−6	22
8	Delhi Dynamos	18	4	6	8	23	27	−4	18
9	Kerala Blasters	18	2	9	7	18	28	−10	15
10	Chennaiyin	18	2	3	13	16	32	−16	9

Source: Indian Super League
Rules for classification: 1) points; 2) head-to-head points; 3) head-to-head goal difference; 4) head-to-head goals scored; 5) goal difference; 5) number of goals scored; 6) fair play ranking; 6) drawing of lots

==== Results summary ====
Overall								Home						Away					
Pld	W	D	L	GF	GA	GD	Pts	W	D	L	GF	GA	GD	W	D	L	GF	GA	GD
18	2	9	7	18	28	−10	15	1	5	3	9	10	−1	1	4	4	9	18	−9

Last updated: 16 December 2018.
Source: Matchday

==== Results by round ====
Round	1	2	3	4	5	6	7	8	9	10	11	12	13	14	15	16	17	18
Ground	A	H	H	A	A	H	H	A	A	H	H	A	H	A	A	H	A	H
Result	W	D	D	D	D	L	L	L	D	D	L	L	D	L	D	W	L	D

Updated to match(es) played on 16 December 2018. Source: Matchday
A = Away; H = Home; W = Win; D = Draw; L = Loss

==== Matchday ====
29 September 2018 1	ATK	0–2	Kerala Blasters	Kolkata, India
19:30 IST (UTC+05:30)	Maimouni (yellow card) 20'	Report	Matej Poplatnik 77'; Slavisa Stojanović 86'	Stadium: Salt Lake Stadium; Attendance: 41,202; Referee: C. R. Srikrishna

5 October 2018 2	Kerala Blasters	1–1	Mumbai City	Kochi, India
19:30 IST (UTC+05:30)	Krčmarević (yellow card) 4'; H.Narzary 24'; Poplatnik (yellow card) 28'; Dheeraj (yellow card) 88'	Report	Mirabaje (yellow card) 81'; P.Bhumij 90+3'	Stadium: Jawaharlal Nehru Stadium; Attendance: 34,539; Referee: Rahul Kumar Gupta

20 October 2018 3	Kerala Blasters	1–1	Delhi Dynamos	Kochi, India
19:30 IST (UTC+05:30)	C. K. Vineeth 4'	Report	Kaluđerović 84'	Stadium: Jawaharlal Nehru Stadium; Attendance: 31,782; Referee: Tejas Nagvenkar

29 October 2018 4	Jamshedpur	2–2	Kerala Blasters	Jamshedpur, India
19:30 IST (UTC+05:30)	T. Cahill 3'; M. Soossiraj 31'; S. Balmuchu (yellow card) 90'	Report	Sahal (yellow card) 57'; Slavisa Stojanović; 71': C. K. Vineeth 85'; S. Doungel (yellow card) 90'	Stadium: JRD Tata Sports Complex; Attendance: 20,889; Referee: C. R. Srikrishna

2 November 2018 5	Pune City	1–1	Kerala Blasters	Pune, India
19:30 IST (UTC+05:30)	Stankovic 13'; Adil Khan (yellow card) 47'; Lalchhuanmawia (yellow card) 72'; Alfaro (yellow card) 87'	Report	Jhingan (yellow card) 33'; Krcmarevic 61'; C. K. Vineeth (yellow card) 75'	Stadium: Shree Shiv Chhatrapati Sports Complex; Attendance: 2,561; Referee: Om Prakash Thakur

5 November 2018 6	Kerala Blasters	1–2	Bengaluru	Kochi, India
19:30 IST (UTC+05:30)	Stojanović 29' (pen.); Lalruatthara (yellow card) 49'; C. K. Vineeth (yellow card) 79'	Report	Sunil Chhetri 17'; Albert Serran (yellow card) 79'; Nikola Krcmarevic 81' (o.g.)	Stadium: Jawaharlal Nehru Stadium, Kochi; Attendance: 29,112; Referee: R.Venkatesh

11 November 2018 7	Kerala Blasters	1–3	Goa	Kochi, India
19:30 IST (UTC+05:30)	Sandesh Jhingan (yellow card) 31'; Nikola Krcmarevic 90+2'	Report	Ferran Corominas 11'; Mohamed Ali (yellow card) 34'; Ferran Corominas 45+2'; Edu Bedia (yellow card) 51'; Manvir Singh 67'; Hugo Boumous (yellow card) 81'	Stadium: Jawaharlal Nehru Stadium, Kochi; Attendance: 21,993; Referee: C. R. Srikrishna

23 November 2018 8	NorthEast United	2–1	Kerala Blasters	Guwahati, India
19:30 IST (UTC+05:30)	Reagan Singh (yellow card) 38'; Bartholomew Ogbeche 90+3' (pen.); Juan Mascia 90+6'	Report	Lakić-Pešić (yellow card) 35'; Matej Poplatnik 73', (yellow card) 88'; Dheeraj Singh (yellow card) 87'; Lalruatthara (yellow card) 90'	Stadium: Indira Gandhi Athletic Stadium; Attendance: 9,476; Referee: Rahul Kumar Gupta

29 November 2018 9	Chennaiyin	0–0	Kerala Blasters	Chennai, India
19:30 IST (UTC+05:30)		Report		Stadium: Jawaharlal Nehru Stadium; Attendance: 12,577; Referee: Muhammad Taqi Aljaafari Bin Jahari

4 December 2018 10	Kerala Blasters	1–1	Jamshedpur	Kochi, India
19:30 IST (UTC+05:30)	Stojanović (yellow card) 19'; Narzary (yellow card) 36'; Dheeraj Singh (yellow card) 66'; Seiminlen Doungel 77'; Zakeer Mundampara (yellow card) 84'	Report	Memo (yellow card) 43'; Calvo 66' (pen.)	Stadium: Jawaharlal Nehru International Stadium; Attendance: 1,564; Referee: Rahul Kumar Gupta

7 December 2018 11	Kerala Blasters	0–1	Pune City	Kochi, India
19:30 IST (UTC+05:30)	Stojanović (yellow card) 58'	Report	Golui (yellow card) 11'; Marcelinho 20'; Panwar (yellow card) 50'; Stanković (yellow card) 54'	Stadium: Jawaharlal Nehru International Stadium; Attendance: 7,349; Referee: Pranjal Banerjee

16 December 2018 12	Mumbai City	6–1	Kerala Blasters	Mumbai, India
19:30 IST (UTC+05:30)	Sougou 12', 15', 30', 90'; Bastos 70'; Mirabaje 89'	Report	Len 27'; Zakeer (yellow card) 35' (yellow-red card) 45'; Sahal (yellow card) 41'	Stadium: Mumbai Football Arena; Attendance: 5,551; Referee: Umesh Bora

25 January 2019 13	Kerala Blasters	1–1	ATK	Kochi, India
19:30 IST (UTC+05:30)	Krčmarević (yellow card) 80'; Lalruatthara (yellow card) 84'; Gerson Vieira 88' (o.g.)	Report	Edu García 85'	Stadium: Jawaharlal Nehru Stadium; Attendance: 4,582; Referee: L Ajitkumar Meitei

31 January 2019 14	Delhi Dynamos	2–0	Kerala Blasters	Delhi, India
19:30 IST (UTC+05:30)	Gianni Zuiverloon 29'; Marcos Tébar (yellow card) 90'; Rene Mihelič 90+1' (pen.)	Report	Lalruatthara (yellow card) 51'; Cyril Kali (yellow card) 68'; Lakić-Pešić (yellow card) 90'	Stadium: Jawaharlal Nehru Stadium; Attendance: 3,134; Referee: A Rowan

6 February 2019 15	Bengaluru	2–2	Kerala Blasters	Bengaluru, India
19:30 IST (UTC+05:30)	Albert Serrán (yellow card) 26'; Paartalu (yellow card) 33'; Udanta Singh 69'; Sunil Chhetri 85'	Report	Stojanović 16' (pen.); Courage Pekuson 40'; Kizito Keziron (yellow card) 45'; Len (yellow card) 54'; Prithan (yellow card) 56'; Sahal (yellow card) 62'	Stadium: Sree Kanteerava Stadium; Attendance: 13,572; Referee: Tejas Nagvenkar

15 February 2019 16	Kerala Blasters	3–0	Chennaiyin	Kochi, India
19:30 IST (UTC+05:30)	Matej Poplatnik 23', 55'; Sahal 71'; Cyril Kali (yellow card) 87'	Report	Chris Herd (yellow card) 12'; Gregory Nelson (yellow card) 67'	Stadium: Jawaharlal Nehru Stadium; Attendance: 3,298; Referee: Adham Mohammad Tumah Makhadmeh

18 February 2019 17	Goa	3–0	Kerala Blasters	Margoa, India
19:30 IST (UTC+05:30)	Ferran Corominas 22'; Edu Bedia 25'; Hugo Boumous 78'	Report	Lalruatthara (yellow card) 34'; Sandesh Jhingan (yellow card) 60'	Stadium: Fatorda Stadium; Attendance: 14,482; Referee: C. R. Srikrishna

1 March 2019 18	Kerala Blasters	0–0	NorthEast United	Kochi, India
19:30 IST (UTC+05:30)	Sandesh Jhingan (yellow card) 32'; Prasanth K (yellow card) 84'	Report	Gurwinder Singh (red card) 23'	Stadium: Jawaharlal Nehru Stadium; Attendance: 8,978; Referee: Rahul Kumar Gupta

== See also ==
- 2018–19 in Indian football
