= Cyril Kali =

Saint Martin footballer (born 1984)

Personal information
- Full name: Cyril Kali
- Date of birth: 21 January 1984 (age 42)
- Place of birth: Besançon, France
- Height: 1.79 m (5 ft 10 in)
- Position: Defensive midfielder

Youth career
- 1998–2003: AJ Auxerre
- 2003–2007: Lille OSC

Senior career*
Years	Team	Apps	(Gls)
2006	Lillestrøm SK	0	(0)
2007–2008	Asteras Tripolis	4	(0)
2008–2010	Panserraikos	29	(1)
2010–2011	Veria	25	(2)
2011	AEL	5	(0)
2012–2013	Veria	34	(2)
2013–2014	Panetolikos	8	(0)
2014–2017	Veria	42	(1)
2017–2018	Apollon Pontus	19	(1)
2018–2019	Kerala Blasters	14	(0)
2019–2023	Panserraikos	32	(2)

International career^{‡}
2019–	Saint Martin	4	(0)
- * Club domestic league appearances and goals as of 05:24, 26 January 2019 (UTC) ‡ National team caps and goals as of 5 September 2019

Cyril Kali (born 21 January 1984) is a professional footballer who plays as a defensive midfielder. Born in France, Kali represented Saint Martin national football team on four occasions.

== Club career ==
Besançon-born Cyril Kali played in his youth years for French side AJ Auxerre and OSC Lille, while making his professional debut for Norwegian side Lillestrøm SK.

In 2006, Kali began his senior career at the Norwegian side Lillestrøm SK. Since 2007, he has played professional football in Greece for PS Kalamata (2007), Asteras Tripolis (2007–08), Panetolikos F.C. (2008–10), Veria F.C. (thrice in 2010–11, 2012–13 and 2014–17 season) AEL (2011) and Apollon Pontus in the 2017–18 season.

As a central defender, Kali has spent more than a decade in the Greek football league where he had turned out for clubs like Asteras, Tripolis and AEL. With Veria, he played 42 league matches and finished Runners-up in the 2011–12 Greek Football League

Indian Super League side Kerala Blasters FC have announced the signing of Cyril Kali for the 2018–19 season. He made 14 appearances and 23 interceptions for the club before moving to Panserraikos F.C. in 2019.

He has also played for Greek side PAOK FC.

== Career statistics ==
=== Kerala Blasters ===
On 3 July 2018, Kali joined Indian Super League top division club Kerala Blasters FC.

Season	League			Cup		Total	
Season	Division	Apps	Goals	Apps	Goals	Apps	Goals
2018–19	Indian Super League	14	0	0	0	14	0
Blasters total		14	0	0	0	14	0

As of 16 March 2018

== International career ==
He made his debut for Saint Martin national football team on 5 September 2019 in a CONCACAF Nations League Group-A match against Barbados, as a starter. He appeared in 4 international matches for his country in 2019.

== Honours ==
Veria

- Football League Greece runners-up: 2011–12

== See also ==
- List of Saint Martin international footballers
