= Courage Pekuson =

Ghanaian footballer (born 1995)

Personal information
- Date of birth: 2 January 1995 (age 31)
- Height: 1.77 m (5 ft 10 in)
- Position: Attacking midfielder

Team information
- Current team: Sherwana
- Number: 18

Youth career
- 2014–2016: Al-Nasr

Senior career*
Years	Team	Apps	(Gls)
2014–2016	Al-Nasr	0	(0)
2014–2015	→ Sohar SC (loan)	16	(6)
2016–2017	Koper	23	(4)
2017–2019	Kerala Blasters	30	(2)
2022–2023	Safa	25	(5)
2024-2025	Sherwana	10	(4)

International career^{‡}
2015	Ghana U23	1	(0)
- * Club domestic league appearances and goals as of 29 January 2025 ‡ National team caps and goals as of 23 May 2015

Courage Pekuson (born 2 January 1995) is a Ghanaian footballer who plays as an attacking midfielder for Kurdistan Premier League club Sherwana.

== Club career ==
=== Sohar SC ===
Pekuson joined Sohar on loan from Al-Nasr in the 2014–2015 season.

=== Koper ===
Pekuson signed for Slovenian PrvaLiga side Koper in August 2016. He made his professional debut for the club on 20 August against NK Radomlje. He came on as a 61st-minute substitute for Joel Valencia as Koper won 3–0. Pekuson scored his first goal for the club on 22 October against NK Domžale. His 2nd-minute goal gave Koper the lead but the club still ended the match losing 3–1. In March 2017, Pekuson received Player of the Week honours for the Slovenian PrvaLiga after he scored a brace 11 March 2017 against NK Radomlje.

=== Kerala Blasters ===
On 10 August 2017 it was announced that Pekuson had signed with the Blasters of the Indian Super League. He made his debut on 17 November 2017 in a home game against ATK which ended in a tie, 0-0. He scored his first goal in a 1–3 loss to Bengaluru FC. Pekuson continued his stint with the Blasters FC in the 2018–19 season.

=== Safa ===
In July 2022, Pekuson joined Lebanese Premier League side Safa.

== International career ==
Pekuson represented the Ghana U23 side.

== Career statistics ==
As of 16 March 2019

Club	Season	League			League Cup		Domestic Cup		Continental		Total	
Club	Season	Division	Apps	Goals	Apps	Goals	Apps	Goals	Apps	Goals	Apps	Goals
Koper	2016–17	PrvaLiga	23	4	—	—	1	0	—	—	24	4
Kerala Blasters	2017–18	ISL	17	1	0	0	1	0	—	—	18	1
Kerala Blasters	2018–19	ISL	13	1	0	0	0	0	—	—	13	1
Kerala Blasters	Blasters total		30	2	0	0	1	0	0	0	31	2
Career total			53	6	0	0	3	0	0	0	56	6
