= Nikola Krčmarević =

Serbian footballer

Personal information
- Full name: Nikola Krčmarević
- Date of birth: 18 December 1991 (age 34)
- Place of birth: Belgrade, SFR Yugoslavia
- Height: 1.87 m (6 ft 2 in)
- Position: Midfielder

Senior career*
Years	Team	Apps	(Gls)
2009–2011	Čukarički	47	(3)
2011–2012	Smederevo	15	(1)
2013	Čukarički	16	(0)
2014	Sinđelić Beograd	14	(1)
2014–2015	Zakynthos	29	(4)
2015–2016	Panegialios	29	(2)
2016	Radnik Surdulica	7	(0)
2017	Panelefsiniakos	17	(0)
2017	Syrianska	14	(0)
2018	07 Vestur	14	(0)
2018–2019	Kerala Blasters	13	(2)
2020	Bačka Palanka	12	(2)
2021	Košice	11	(0)
2021–2022	Karaiskakis	22	(1)
2023	Hajduk Divoš		
2023-	Žarkovo		

International career
2010	Serbia U19	2	(0)
2011	Serbia U21	2	(0)
- * Club domestic league appearances and goals as of 2 December 2022

Nikola Krčmarević (Serbian Cyrillic: Никола Крчмаревић; born 18 December 1991) is a Serbian professional footballer who plays as a midfielder.

== Club career ==
Krčmarević joined Faroese side 07 Vestur in 2018 and represented Kerala Blasters in the 2018–19 Indian Super League season. He played their first 12 league matches and a cup match and has netted 2 goals.

In 2021, he moved to Slovakia to play for second-tier outfit Košice.

== Career statistics ==
Season	League			Cup		Total	
Season	Division	Apps	Goals	Apps	Goals	Apps	Goals
2018–19	Indian Super League	13	2	1	0	14	2
Blasters total		13	2	1	0	14	2
