= Kizito Keziron =

Ugandan footballer (born 1997)

Keziron Kizito
Personal information
- Full name: Kizito Keziron
- Date of birth: 17 January 1997 (age 29)
- Place of birth: Uganda
- Height: 6 ft 0 in (1.83 m)
- Position: Midfielder

Team information
- Current team: ZESCO United

Senior career*
Years	Team	Apps	(Gls)
2014–2016	Vipers	19	(12)
2016–2017	Leopards	16	(8)
2017–2019	Kerala Blasters	17	(0)
2019–2021	KCCA	49	(0)
2022–	ZESCO United	2	(1)

International career^{‡}
2015–	Uganda	17	(1)
- * Club domestic league appearances and goals as of 16 March 2019 ‡ National team caps and goals as of 22:14, 31 October 2015 (UTC)

Kizito Keziron (born 17 January 1997) is a Ugandan professional footballer who plays as a midfielder for Zambia Super League club ZESCO United and the Uganda national team. In 2015, Keziron was among the nominees for male player of the year for the FUFA Airtel Player's Award.

== Youth career ==
At his early age, Kizito was a member of St. Mary's Kitende where he was among the Copa Coca-Cola cup winning team of 2013 in Kabale. He then joined KJT Rweshama where he played for one season in 2013/14.

== Club career ==
=== Vipers ===
He made his debut for Vipers SC in September 2014 against Entebbe FC and in the same match he scored his first goal. Kizito made 14 assists as he guided Vipers to league glory playing for the first time in the top flight League (2014/2015 season). Kizito was a pivotal player in the midfield of Vipers SC as they notched up their second league title in the club's history. Plying his maiden season in the top flight, Kizito’s passing in the middle of the park caught many of his opponents unawares.

=== AFC Leopards ===
In June 2017, Kizito joined Kenyan side AFC Leopards as a free agent from Vipers SC and signed a two-year contract with them. He made his debut on 27 July 2017 against Bidco United. Keziron came off the bench to score his first goal as AFC Leopards edged Bidco United 2–1 in the GOtv Cup round of 16 at the Thika Municipal Stadium.

=== Kerala Blasters ===
He made his debut for Blasters on 4 January 2018 against FC Pune City coming as a substitute replacing Dimitar Berbatov in the 46th minute. He could not play the entire season as he picked an injury midway through the 2017–18 season. He continued his stint with the Blasters in 2018-19 season also.

=== KCCA ===
In September 2019 he joined KCCA FC and signed a 2-year contract. On 2 October 2019, he made his debut for KCCA FC against Tooro FC.

== International career ==
Kizito made his debut for Uganda National Team on 9 November 2014 at Mandela National Stadium against Ethiopia. He scored his first goal for Uganda National Team on 4 July 2015 against Tanzania in CHAN 2016 Preliminary Round. He was part of the Uganda Cranes team that won CECAFA Cup 2015 in Ethiopia. He was also a squad member for Uganda which played in CHAN 2016 which took place in Rwanda.

Uganda
Year	Apps	Goals
2014	1	0
2015	11	1
2016	5	0
Total	17	1

Statistics accurate as of match played 4 June 2016

=== International goals ===
Scores and results list Uganda's goal tally first.

No	Date	Venue	Opponent	Score	Result	Competition
1.	4 July 2015	Nakivubo Stadium, Kampala, Uganda	Tanzania	1–1	1–1	2016 African Nations Championship qualification

== Career statistics ==
Season	League			Cup		Total	
Season	Division	Apps	Goals	Apps	Goals	Apps	Goals
2017–18	Indian Super League	4	0	0	0	4	0
2018–19	Indian Super League	13	0	1	0	14	0
total		17	0	1	0	18	0

As of 16 March 2019

== Honours ==
=== Club ===
Vipers SC

- Ugandan Premier League: 2015
- Ugandan Cup: 2016

=== International ===
Uganda

- CECAFA Cup: 2015
