= Nemanja Lakić-Pešić =

Serbian footballer

Personal information
- Date of birth: 22 September 1991 (age 35)
- Place of birth: Belgrade, SFR Yugoslavia
- Height: 1.92 m (6 ft 3 1/2 in)
- Position: Centre-back

Team information
- Current team: Dinamo 1945

Youth career
- Rad

Senior career*
Years	Team	Apps	(Gls)
2009–2014	Donji Srem	145	(6)
2015–2016	Radnički Niš	47	(2)
2016–2017	Kapfenberger SV	19	(0)
2017–2019	Kerala Blasters	26	(0)
2019	Voždovac	0	(0)
2020	Napredak Kruševac	5	(0)
2020	Levadia	8	(0)
2020	Levadia II	1	(0)
2021	Bačka	5	(0)
2021–2022	Javor Ivanjica	22	(2)
2022	Riteriai	10	(2)
2023–	Dinamo 1945		

International career
2007	Serbia U18	1	(0)
- * Club domestic league appearances and goals as of 3 March 2023

Nemanja Lakić-Pešić (Serbian Cyrillic: Немања Лакић-Пешић; born 14 January 1991) is a Serbian footballer who plays as a centre back.

== Career ==
=== Kerala Blasters ===
Lakić-Pešić represented Kerala Blasters FC in Indian Super League in the 2017-18 season. He also continued his stint with the Blasters in the 2018-19 season.

Season	League			Cup		Total	
Season	Division	Apps	Goals	Apps	Goals	Apps	Goals
2017–18	Indian Super League	12	0	1	0	13	0
2018–19	Indian Super League	14	0	1	0	15	0
Blasters total		26	0	2	0	28	0

=== Javor Ivanjica ===
On 9 August 2021, Lakić-Pešić joined Javor Ivanjica on a one-year contract.

=== Riteriai ===
On 1 September 2022, Lakić-Pešić became a member of Lithuanian club Riteriai.

== Honours ==
Donji Srem

- Serbian League Vojvodina: 2010–11
