= Mark Sifneos =

Dutch-Greek association football player

Personal information
- Date of birth: 24 November 1996 (age 29)
- Place of birth: Amsterdam, Netherlands
- Height: 1.92 m (6 ft 4 in)
- Position: Striker

Team information
- Current team: PAOK B
- Number: 49

Youth career
- 2010–2011: WV-HEDW
- 2011–2012: SV Rap
- 2012–2013: RKSV RODA '23
- 2013–2014: SV Argon
- 2014–2015: Brabant United

Senior career*
Years	Team	Apps	(Gls)
2015–2017	Waalwijk	3	(0)
2017–2018	Kerala Blasters	11	(4)
2018	Goa	7	(1)
2018–2020	Panathinaikos	0	(0)
2019–2020	→ Apollon Larissa (loan)	19	(7)
2020–2021	Chiasso	31	(5)
2021–2022	Ayia Napa	25	(15)
2022–2024	AEZ Zakakiou	60	(13)
2024–2025	Akritas Chlorakas	24	(2)
2025–2026	Kavala	27	(12)
2026–	PAOK B	0	(0)
- * Club domestic league appearances and goals as of 21:00, 26 April 2026 (UTC)

Mark Sifneos (Greek: Μαρκ Σιφναίος; born 24 November 1996) is a Greek-Dutch professional footballer who plays as a striker for Super League 2 club PAOK B. Besides Greece, he has played in India, Cyprus, Switzerland and the Netherlands.

== Career ==
He made his professional debut in the Eerste Divisie for RKC Waalwijk on 1 February 2016 in a game against Jong PSV. In August 2017, he signed for Kerala Blasters. He is the youngest foreigner to be signed by a team in the Indian Super League. He left Kerala Blasters with mutual consent on 23 January 2018.

On 26 January, he joined FC Goa till the end of the season.

On 4 August 2018, Sifneos signed a three-year contract with Greek club Panathinaikos, for an undisclosed fee. On 15 July 2019, Panathinaikos informed about the loan of Sifneos to Apollon Larissa F.C. He had been the first addition to the squad last year, but he succeeded to play only 11 minutes against O. F. Ierapetra for the Greek Cup. In the 2019–20 season, he made progress in the Super League 2 with Apollon Larissa, registering seven goals in 19 matches.

On 21 July 2020, he signed with Chiasso on a free transfer.
