= Deependra Negi =

Indian footballer

Personal information
- Full name: Deependra Singh Negi
- Date of birth: 20 November 1998 (age 27)
- Place of birth: Uttarakhand, India
- Height: 1.76 m (5 ft 9 1/2 in)
- Position: Midfielder

Team information
- Current team: Mumbai Kenkre FC
- Number: 16

Youth career
- 2013–2016: AIFF Elite Academy
- 2016–2017: CF Reus

Senior career*
Years	Team	Apps	(Gls)
2016–2019	Kerala Blasters FC(B)		
2017–2018	Kerala Blasters FC	3	(1)
2019–2022	Hyderabad FC		
2022–	Mumbai Kenkre FC		

International career
2014–2015	India U17	12	(2)
- * Club domestic league appearances and goals

Deependra Singh Negi (born 20 November 1998) is an Indian professional footballer who is playing as a midfielder for Mumbai Kenkre FC. He was the captain of the India U17 National Team.

== Career ==
Born in Uttarakhand, Negi began his career with the AIFF Elite Academy before moving to Spain to attend trials with various Spanish clubs, including Gimnàstic de Tarragona in 2017. In September 2016, it was announced that Negi had signed with CF Reus of the Segunda División.

=== Kerala Blasters ===
On 9 December 2017 it was announced that Negi had returned to India to sign with the Kerala Blasters of the Indian Super League. He made his professional debut for the club on 27 January 2018 against Delhi Dynamos. He came on as a substitute for Karan Sawhney at halftime and made an immediate impact for the club as he scored the Kerala Blasters equalizer in the 48th minute from a corner. He then contributed to the second goal by drawing a penalty after a run into the box, which was then converted by Iain Hume. The Kerala Blasters would win the match 2–1 and Negi was awarded with the Hero of the Match award.

== International career ==
Negi has represented the India under-17 and under 20 side. He was a former India under-17 national team captain. He has represented India in the SAFF championship in Nepal where the Indian team defeated Nepal 1–0 in the final played at the Dasharath Stadium in Kathmandu. Negi has also participated in the AFC Cup qualifiers held in Kuwait.

== Club career ==
In 2016, at the age of 17, Deependra Singh Negi moved to Spain after signing professional terms with Spanish Club CF Reus. Club de Futbol Reus Deportiu, better known as just Reus, participates in the Spanish Segunda Division, the second tier of the football pyramid in Spain. The team plays all its matches at the 4,700 seater Estadi Municipal, in the autonomous region of Reus, Catalonia. Prior to this, Negi joined the Catalonians' U19 team for practice sessions. Negi was the second Indian youngster to move to Spain in order to earn a contract, after defender Avneet Bharti shifted base to the European country earlier.

Negi was selected to play for the Kerala Blasters, an Indian Super League team in 2017. His contract with Kerala Blasters started from 9 December 2017 and runs till 30 May 2020. Negi made his professional debut for the side in 2017–18 Indian Super League Season against Delhi Dynamos. In his debut game, he started playing from second half and played until the end of the match as Kerala Blasters won 2–1. Negi became Hero of the match in his debut match by scoring his first goal in just the second minute of his playing time and became the second youngest footballer in the league to score a goal.

== Career statistics ==
As of 27 January 2018

Club	Season	League			Cup		Continental		Total	
Club	Season	Division	Apps	Goals	Apps	Goals	Apps	Goals	Apps	Goals
Kerala Blasters	2017–18	ISL	3	1	1	0	0	0	4	1
Career total			3	1	1	0	0	0	4	1

== See also ==
- List of Indian football players in foreign leagues
